= List of cities, towns and villages in West Azerbaijan province =

A list of cities, towns and villages in West Azerbaijan Province of north-western Iran:

== Alphabetically ==
Cities are in bold text; all others are villages.

== A ==
Ab Khvordeh | Abajaluy-e Olya | Abajaluy-e Sofla | Abarabashi | Abati | Abbas Bolaghi | Abbas Bolaghi | Abbas Kandi | Abbas Kandi | Abbasabad | Abbasabad | Abbasabad | Abbasabad | Abd ol Razzaq | Abdi Beyg | Abdolabad | Abdollah Kandi | Abdollah Kordeh | Abdollah Tappehsi | Abdollahabad | Abdollahabad | Ab-e Garm | Abgarm | Adaghan | Adeh | Adeh | Afan | Agh Barzeh | Agh Bash | Agh Bolagh | Agh Bolagh | Agh Dizaj | Agh Dunlu | Agh Gol | Agh Mazar-e Kord | Agh Otluq | Agh Veran | Aghajari | Aghasur | Aghbolagh | Aghbolagh | Aghbolagh-e Chamanlu | Aghbolagh-e Hamadani | Aghbolagh-e Kalisa Kandi | Aghbolagh-e Khaled | Aghbolagh-e Mokhur | Aghbolagh-e Olya | Aghbolagh-e Suqar | Aghcheh Masjed | Aghcheh Qaleh | Aghcheh Qeshlaq | Aghcheh Ziveh | Aghchehlu | Aghdarreh | Aghdash | Aghdash | Aghdash | Agheshlu | Aghjivan | Aghlan | Aghlian | Aghsaqal | Aghutman | Aghyar | Agri Bujaq | Agricultural Station | Ahmad Baryu | Ahmad Beyg | Ahmad Gharib | Ahmadabad | Ahmadabad | Ahmadabad | Ahmadabad | Ahmadabad-e Dash Kasan | Ahmadabad-e Olya | Ahmadabad-e Qashqaguz | Ahmadabad-e Sofla | Ajami | Ajamlu | Ajay | Ajvaj | Akbarabad | Akhi Jan | Akhteh Khaneh | Akhtetar | Akhurlu | Akhyan | Akhyan-e Bozorg | Akhyan-e Kuchek | Al Sormeh | Alaguz | Alaguz-e Olya | Alaguz-e Sofla | Alakava | Alasaqqal | Alavan | Albolagh | Albolagh | Aleyh | Ali Beyglu | Ali Bolaghi | Ali Bolaghi | Ali Kan | Ali Kand | Ali Kandi | Ali Kandi | Ali Kandi | Ali Malek | Ali Mardan | Ali Nazar | Ali Qandu | Ali Sheykh | Ali Yar Kandi | Ali Yar | Aliabad | Aliabad | Aliabad | Aliabad | Aliabad | Aliabad | Aliabad | Aliabad | Aliabad-e Baran Duz | Aliabad-e Nokhowd Darreh | Alian | Alibeyglu | Alichin | Allah Verdi Kandi | Allah Verdi Kandi | Almalu | Almanabad | Almaran | Alqian | Alquyruq | Alu Hajju | Aluchehluy-e Olya | Aluchehluy-e Sofla | Alujenni | Alvach | Alvatan | Aman Kandi | Amid | Aminabad | Aminabad | Aminabad | Amineh Deh | Aminlu | Amir Beyg | Amirabad | Amirabad | Amirabad | Amukhanzi-ye Olya | Amukhanzi-ye Sofla | Anbar | Anbar-e Maran | Anbar-e Olya | Anbar-e Sofla | Anbi | Andizeh | Angaman | Angeneh | Angurud | Anhar-e Olya | Anhar-e Sofla | Antar Kandi | Aq Bolagh-e Meydan | Aq Bolagh-e Olya | Aq Bolagh-e Sofla | Aq Kand-e Baruq | Aq Otaq | Aq Qaleh | Aq Tappeh | Aq Ziarat | Aqa Beyglu | Aqa Beyk | Aqa Esmail | Aqamir Kandi | Aqbal | Aqdarreh-ye Olya | Aqdarreh-ye Sofla | Aqdarreh-ye Vosta | Aqduz | Aqkand | Aqrablu | Arab Dizaji | Arablu | Arabluy-e Bisheh | Arabluy-e Darreh | Arabluy-e Yekan | Arabshah | Arabshah | Arafat | Arbanus | Arbat-e Olya | Arbat-e Sofla | Arena | Ariglu | Arkavin | Arkhashan | Armanak-e Olya | Armanak-e Sofla | Armani Bolaghi | Armudaghaj | Arnesa | Arpachayi | Arpaliq | Arzin | Asadollah Kandi | Asb Mirza | Asengaran | Asgarabad Tappeh | Asgarabad | Asgarabad | Asgarabad-e Kuh | Ashab | Ashi Golan | Ashkan-e Olya | Ashkan-e Sofla | Ashki | Ashkutan | Ashnaabad | Ashnak | Ashti Bolagh | Aski Baghdad | Aslanik | Asman Bolaghi | Aspugheh | Ata Bolaghi | Atdarrahsi | Avajiq | Avdelan-e Olya | Avdelan-e Sofla | Avdi | Aversi | Ayan | Aydinlu | Aydisheh | Ayeblu | Ayqalehsi | Azab | Azad | Azadegan | Azim Kandi | Azim Khanlu | Aziz Kand | Aziz Kandi

== B ==
Baba Ahmad | Baba Nazar | Baba Nur | Babaganjeh | Babakan | Babalu | Babarud | Bab-e Khaledabad | Babelabad | Babkarabad | Babur-e Ajam | Babur-e Kord | Bachanlu | Bachehjik | Badaki | Badaki | Badalabad | Badalan | Badam | Badamlu | Badarlu | Badelbu | Badinabad-e Mangur | Badinabad-e Piran | Badkharid | Badmahmud | Badrabad | Baduli | Bafarvan | Bagerdan-e Olya | Bagerdan-e Sofla | Bagh Daraq | Bagh | Baghcheh Jik | Baghcheh Juq | Baghcheh Misheh | Baghcheh | Baghcheh | Bagh-e Olya | Bagh-e Rajab | Bagh-e Sofla | Baghestan | Baghlachi-ye Olya | Baghlachi-ye Sofla | Baghlujeh | Bagtash | Baharabad | Bahik | Bahleh | Bahlul Kandi | Bahlulabad | Bahramabad | Bajvand | Bakhsh Kandi | Bakhtiaran | Bala Gir | Bala Kahriz | Balaban | Balaban | Balaji | Balajuk | Balakan | Balan | Balanej | Balav | Balderlu | Balestan | Balesur-e Olya | Balesur-e Sofla | Baliqchi | Balowlan | Balqazan | Baltan | Balu | Banabad | Banaveh | Banaveylah-e Hajji Mineh | Band | Bandareh | Band-e Majid Khan | Bandeli | Banehzir | Bani | Banu Khalaf | Banui | Barajuq | Baran Duz | Barani-ye Ajam | Barani-ye Kord | Baraspi | Barazi | Barbaran | Barbin | Bardan | Bardarash-e Olya | Bardarash-e Sofla | Bardeh Gureh | Bardeh Kish | Bardeh Mish | Bardeh Naqshineh | Bardeh Qel | Bardeh Rash | Bardeh Rashan | Bardeh Rashan | Bardeh Sepian | Bardeh Zard | Bardehsur | Bardehsur | Bardehzi-ye Olya | Bardian | Barduk | Bargoshad | Bari Ashi | Bari | Barikayi | Bariteh | Bariyamabad | Barreju | Barun | Baruq | Baruzh | Barveh | Barzhuk | Bash Achiq | Bash Barat | Bash Bolagh | Bash Kahriz | Bashkand | Bashlan Beshlu | Baskeh Rut | Basreh | Basri | Basrik | Bastakabad | Bastam Beg | Bastam | Batchi | Batrian | Bavan | Bavan | Baveh | Baveleh-ye Seyyedan | Baveleh-ye Sofla | Bayancholi-ye Ajam | Bayancholi-ye Kord | Bayat | Bayetmish | Bayezava | Bayram Kandi | Bayram Kandi | Bayram Qalehsi | Bazargan | Bazargan | Bazhergah | Behestan | Benavileh-ye Bozorg | Benavileh-ye Kuchak | Benguin | Beran | Berasb | Berava | Berazan | Berenjabad | Berenjeh | Beri | Berisu | Berkmeran | Berushkhvaran | Best | Beyg Darvish | Beyg Kandi | Beygom Qaleh | Beygtuli-ye Olya | Beyk Jan | Beyram | Beytas | Bezileh | Bi Bakran | Bianlu | Bibi Kand | Bikus | Bileh Var | Bilukeh | Bimzorteh | Biquz | Birlan | Bishasb | Bitush | Bizandeh | Bizhabad | Bohlulabad | Bolarghu | Boljak | Boluz | Borhan | Borhanlu | Bowzeh | Boyuk Bolagh | Boyuran-e Olya | Boyuran-e Sofla | Bozghaleh | Bozgush | Bozlu | Bozorgabad | Bozveh | Bubaneh | Bughda Daghi | Bukan Integrated Livestock | Bukan | Bulamaj | Burashan | Burbur | Buyla Push

== C ==
Cement Cooperative | Chahar Borj | Chahar Bot | Chahar Divar | Chahar Qaleh | Chahar Sotun | Chahar Taq | Chahargah | Chahriq-e Olya | Chahriq-e Sofla | Chakher Ahmad | Chakhmaq | Chakhmaqlui-ye Sofla | Chakmeh Zar | Chaku | Chali Khamaz | Chalyan | Chamaki | Chaman | Chamanlu | Chanaqlu | Chap Darreh | Chapar | Chaparabad | Chaplujeh | Chapu | Chaqal-e Mostafa | Chareh | Chavarchin | Chavgun | Chavoshqoli | Chavrash | Chehel Asiab | Chehreh Gosha | Chelik | Cher | Cheragh Abdal | Cheragh Tappeh-ye Olya | Cheragh Tappeh-ye Sofla | Cherikabad | Cheshmeh Gol | Cheshmeh | Chianeh | Chianeh | Chichagluy-e Mansur | Chichak | Chichaklu | Chichakluy-e Bash Qaleh | Chichakluy-e Hajji Aqa | Chir Kandi | Chir | Chokhur Kand | Chonqeraluy-e Pol | Chonqeraluy-e Yekan | Chowalan | Chowmel | Chowplu | Chub Tarash | Chubanluy-e Olya | Chubanluy-e Sofla | Chughanlu | Chumaran | Chumelan | Churs

== D ==
Dadeh Saqi | Dagheh | Dalavan | Dalek Dash | Dalikdash | Daljeli | Dalow | Damdama | Damirchi | Damirchi | Danabolagh | Danaluy-e Bozorg | Danaluy-e Kuchak | Danguz-e Olya | Danqaralu | Dar Darreh Si | Darab | Darageh-ye Lotfollah | Darageh-ye Oros Khan | Darah Gerdaleh | Darazam | Darband | Darband | Darband | Darbaran | Darbarud | Darbekeh | Darbesar | Dareh Lak | Dareh Senji | Dargahqoli | Darghalu | Darin Qaleh | Darmakun | Darman | Darmandek | Darmarjan | Darsavin | Darvish Ali | Darvish Kandi | Darvish Rash | Darvishan | Darzeh Konan | Darzi Vali | Dash Aghol | Dash Alti | Dash Band | Dash Bolagh | Dash Feshal | Dash Kasan | Dash Kasan | Dash Khaneh | Dash Pasak | Dash Qez Qapan | Dash Tappeh | Dash Teymur | Dashaghol | Dash-e Darageh | Dasht-e Gandoman | Dasht-e Qureh | Dashteh | Dashti | Dastjerd | Davahchi | Daveh Shahri | Davudabad | Dayeh Sheykhi | Daylan Kandi | Daylaq | Daymav | Dazgir | Degeh | Degeh | Deh Bekr | Deh Gorji | Deh Mansur | Deh Shams-e Bozorg | Deh Shams-e Kuchak | Deh-e Veys Aqa | Dehkadeh-ye Asayesh | Deladar | Delakverdi | Delazi | Demdem | Department of Agriculture | Dereshk | Dergah | Derik | Deryaz | Deshvan | Deyr Ali | Dibak | Dibak | Didan-e Olya | Didan-e Sofla | Dilanchi Arkhi-ye Olya | Dilanchi Arkhi-ye Sofla | Dilbilmaz | Dilzeh | Dim Qeshlaq-e Olya | Dinaran | Divalan | Divankhaneh | Dizaj Diz | Dizaj | Dizaj-e Aland | Dizaj-e Batchi | Dizaj-e Bozorg | Dizaj-e Dowl | Dizaj-e Fathi | Dizaj-e Hatam Khan | Dizaj-e Herik | Dizaj-e Jamshid Khan | Dizaj-e Morteza Kandi | Dizaj-e Naqaleh | Dizaj-e Rahim Pur | Dizaj-e Takyeh | Dizaj-e Tavil | Do Ab | Do Bareh | Do Seyyed | Dol Dol Bolaghi | Donbaki | Dorud | Dowkana | Dowla Pasan | Dowlahtu | Dowlatabad | Dowlatabad | Dowlehtu | Dowli Khanvan | Dowrbeh | Dowrt Aghach | Dowyran | Dowzan | Duchuman | Duday | Duh Aghli | Dukchi | Dul Bahar | Dul Pamu | Dulama | Dulanqir | Duleh | Dulehbi | Duleh-ye Garm | Duli Guzan | Dulkan | Dur Bash | Dushan Tappeh | Dustak | Dustalan | Dustali | Dustan | Duz Aghol

== E ==
Ebrahim Bur | Ebrahim Hesari | Ebrahim Khesar | Ebrahimabad | Ebrahimeh | Egriqash | Elibalta | Elmabad | Elyasabad | Elyasi | Emam Kandi | Emam Kandi | Emam Kandi | Emamqoli Kandi-ye Olya | Emamqoli Kandi-ye Sofla | Emamzadeh | Ersi | Eshkhal | Eshqabad | Eskandarabad | Eslam Tappeh | Eslamabad | Eslamabad | Eslamabad | Eslamabad | Eslamabad | Eslamabad | Eslamlu | Eslamlu | Eslampanahabadi Jadid | Esmail Kahrizi | Esmail Kandi | Esmail Kandi | Esmail Kandi | Esteran | Etezadiyeh | Eyn Molla | Eyn ol Rrum | Eyshgeh | Ezzatabad | Ezzatabad

== F ==
Fajrabad | Fanai | Faqer Khadariyan | Faqibeyglu | Faqih Beyglu | Faqir Soleyman | Farrokhzad | Fatah Kandi | Fathabad | Felekan | Fesenduz | Feyzabad | Feyzabad | Firuraq | Firuzabad | Firuzian | Fuladlu

== G ==
Gabaran | Gabazeleh | Gabrabad | Gachi Qalehsi | Gachi | Gagosh-e Olya | Gagosh-e Sofla | Gajin | Gakowzheh-ye Olya | Gakowzheh-ye Sofla | Gal Ashaqi | Galeh Khar | Galineh-ye Bozorg | Galineh-ye Kuchak | Galleh Behi | Galleh Peran | Galu | Galvan | Gamus | Ganahdar | Ganeh Dar | Ganehdar | Gangachin | Ganjabad | Ganjabad | Ganjabad | Gapis | Garavi | Gard Aseh | Gardabad | Gardeshinan | Gardian | Gardim Khaneh | Gargul-e Olya | Gargul-e Sofla | Garm Darreh | Garmab-e Olya | Garmavich | Garnavik | Gartak | Garvar | Garvis | Garzhal-e Olya | Garzhal-e Sofla | Gavazleh | Gavdari-ye Qarah Ney | Gavlan | Gavlan | Gavlan | Gavmish Goli | Gavmishan | Gavmishan | Gayanjeh | Gaz Darreh | Gazanehkesh | Gazgasak | Gazgasak | Gaznaq | Gedai | Geday | Gelaz | Gel-e Espid | Gerd Ashvan | Gerd Basak | Gerd Kashaneh | Gerd Kavlan | Gerd Morad Beg | Gerd Naleyn | Gerd Qebran | Gerd Rahmat | Gerd Sheytan | Gerdah Belij | Gerdak-e Sepian | Gerd-e Kashan | Gerd-e Shilan | Gerd-e Yaqub | Gerdegeh Gol | Gerdeh Bardan | Gerdeh Bon | Gerdeh Gerow | Gerdeh Qit | Gerdeh Qol | Gerdeh Rash | Gerdeh Rash | Gerdeh Sur | Gerdevan | Gerdik Naser | Gerdik | Gerdmareshk | Gergereh | Gerik | Gezelan | Ghaffar Behi | Ghalleh Zaghesi | Gharib Kandi | Ghazan | Gheyb Ali | Ghowsabad | Giah Dowran | Gingur | Girah Kandi | Givan | Givaran | Gochlar | Godaklu | Gol Ali | Gol Marzanik | Gol Mavaran | Gol Pashin | Gol Seyyed | Gol Soleymanabad | Gol Tappeh | Gol Tappeh-ye Qurmish | Gol | Gol | Golabad | Goladur | Golanik-e Olya | Golanik-e Sofla | Golcharmu | Goldanlu | Gol-e Behi | Gol-e Sheykhan | Goleh Dam | Golestaneh | Golhar | Goli Suyi | Goli | Golinan | Golkanak | Golmankhaneh | Golozan | Golulan-e Olya | Golulan-e Sofla | Golyar | Goman | Gonbad | Gonbad | Gonbad | Gondakeh | Gondaman | Gond-e Molla Isa | Gond-e Vila | Gorgabad | Goruk Kandi | Gowdal | Gowharan | Gowjar | Gowlak | Gowmelian | Gowzalli | Gowzgavand | Gowzluy-e Olya | Gowzluy-e Sofla | Gozileh | Gubeh | Gug Jalu | Gug Tappeh | Gug Tappeh | Gug Tappeh | Gug Tappeh-ye Khaleseh | Gug Tappeh-ye Laleh | Gugerd | Gugerdchi | Guik | Gulan-e Sofla | Guleh Guleh | Guleh | Guleh | Guli | Gundak-e Molla | Guranabad | Guranabad-e Pashai | Guranabad-e Qazi | Guranabad-e Qazzaq | Gurangan | Gurash | Gurchin Qaleh | Gureh Shar | Gurkhaneh | Gurparan | Guy Aghaj | Guy Kharabeh | Guyj Ali Tappeh | Guyjeh Ali Aslan | Guyjeh Yaran | Guzal Bolagh | Guzik | Guzik

== H ==
Habash-e Olya | Habash-e Sofla | Habashi | Hablas | Hablas | Hachasu | Hachi Darreh | Hadar | Hadar | Haftabad | Haftsaran | Haftvan | Haftvaneh | Hajjat Kadeh | Hajji Ahmad Kandi | Hajji Ali Kand | Hajji Babay-e Olya | Hajji Babay-e Sofla | Hajji Babay-e Vosta | Hajji Baghlu | Hajji Bayram | Hajji Behzad | Hajji Firuz | Hajji Ghaldeh | Hajji Hasan | Hajji Hasan | Hajji Hasan-e Khaleseh | Hajji Hasan-e Olya | Hajji Jafan | Hajji Kand | Hajji Kandi | Hajji Karimi Coffee Company | Hajji Khvosh | Hajji Lak | Hajji Mamian | Hajji Pirlu | Hajji Sufi | Hajjiabad | Hajjiabad | Hajjiabad | Hajjiabad-e Okhtachi | Hajjilar | Haju | Haki | Halabi | Halafaleh | Halah Qush | Halaj | Halhal-e Olya | Halhal-e Sofla | Halulan | Halveh | Hamid | Hammamian | Hammamlar | Hampa | Hamran | Hamzeh Kandi | Hamzeh Qasem | Hamzehabad | Hamzehabad | Hamzehabad-e Olya | Hamzehabad-e Sofla | Hamzian-e Olya | Hamzian-e Sofla | Hangabad | Hangravan | Haplaran | Haq | Haqvaran | Harakian | Haramlu | Harzeneh | Hasan Chap | Hasan Kandi | Hasan Kandi | Hasan Kandi | Hasan Kandi | Hasan Nuran | Hasan Owlan | Hasanabad | Hasanabad | Hasanabad | Hasanabad | Hasanabad | Hasanabad | Hasanabad | Hasanabad | Hasanlu | Hasanlu | Hasanlu | Hasbasheh | Hasbestan | Hasel Qubi-ye Afshar | Hasel Qubi-ye Amirabad | Hashemabad | Hashiabad | Hashieh Rud | Hashtian | Hasin-e Bozorg | Hasin-e Kuchak | Hastehjuk | Hasu Kandi | Hasulazgi | Hasushaki | Hasushiri | Havanduk | Havarabid | Havareh Barzeh | Hejran | Hemmatabad | Hendabad | Hendevan | Hendovan | Hendvar | Hermeh | Hesar Bolaghi | Hesar Kharabeh | Hesar | Hesar | Hesar | Hesar | Hesar-e Agh Bolagh | Hesar-e Babaganjeh | Hesar-e Bahram Khan | Hesar-e Gapuchi | Hesar-e Hajjilar | Hesar-e Qarah Tappeh | Hesar-e Sofla | Hesar-e Sopurghan | Hesar-e Tarmani | Hesar-e Torkaman | Hesarlu | Heshterak | Heydar Baghi | Heydarabad | Heydarabad | Heydarabad | Heydarlu | Heydarlu | Heydarluy-e Beyglar | Heyran | Hormozabad | Hoseyn Ali Kandi-ye Ajam | Hoseyn Beyglu | Hoseyn Mameh | Hoseynabad | Hoseynabad | Hoseynabad | Hoseynabad | Hoseynabad-e Marakan | Hoseynabad-e Qaleh | Hovarsin | Howbeh-ye Kukhan | Hulasu | Hurow

== I ==
Ideluy-e Olya | Ideluy-e Sofla | Igdir | Il Bolaghi | Ilan Qarah-ye Olya | Ilan Qarah-ye Sofla | Ilani | Ilanlu Tappeh | Ilanlu | Ilazgi | Il-e Teymur | Incheh Darrehsi | Incheh Salah-e Olya | Incheh Salah-e Sofla | Incheh | Incheh | Incheh-ye Hajj Mohammad | Incheh-ye Nurollah | Incheh-ye Olya | Incheh-ye Qadim | Incheh-ye Sofla | Industrial Estate | Iraqi Refugee Camp | IRIB Broadcasting Station | Irvanlu | Isa Golik | Isa Kand | Isa Kandi | Isa Khan | Isalu | Isaluy-e Heydarlu | Isaluy-e Zemi | Ishgeh Su | Ishgeh Su | Ivughli

== J ==
Ja Shiran | Jabal Kandi | Jabalkandi | Jabbar Kandi | Jabbarand | Jabiglu | Jafarabad | Jafarabad | Jafarabad | Jafarabad-e Chelik | Jafarian | Jaffal | Jagan | Jaganlu | Jaganluy-e Kord | Jaldian Garrison | Jaldian | Jalil Kandi | Jalqaran | Jamal Kandi | Jamalabad | Jamalabad | Jamalabad | Jambugheh | Jamgeh | Jan Aqa | Jan Aziz | Jan Bolagh | Jandar | Jandaran | Jang Tappeh | Jang-e Sar | Jang-e Sar | Janizeh | Janvislu | Jarchelu | Jarchelu | Jatar | Javad Hesari | Javanmard | Javzar | Jebreilabad | Jedaqayah | Jehatlu | Jeran | Jeyran-e Olya | Jeyran-e Sofla | Jol | Jolbar | Jowrni | Juhni | Jujahi | Jushatuy-e Olya | Jushatuy-e Sofla

== K ==
Kachalabad | Kachaleh | Kafacherin | Kafil | Kahel-e Olya | Kahel-e Sofla | Kahriz | Kahriz | Kahriz | Kahriz-e Ajam | Kahriz-e Qaleh Daresi | Kahriz-e Sardar | Kahrizeh-ye Ali Aqa | Kahrizeh-ye Mahmud Aqa | Kahrizeh-ye Shakak | Kahrizeh-ye Sheykhan | Kajut | Kakalar | Kakusan | Kalashan | Kaldageh | Kaleh Darreh | Kalehkin | Kalik | Kalleh Kavi | Kalran | Kalt-e Olya | Kalt-e Sofla | Kalus | Kalvan | Kalvanes | Kam | Kamalabad | Kamam | Kamaneh | Kamus | Kanan-e Olya | Kanan-e Sofla | Kandal | Kandeh Qulan-e Sofla | Kaneh Mashkeh | Kaneh Varcheh | Kanespi | Kanespi | Kangarlu | Kani Ali Gordeh | Kani Allah Seyedeh | Kani Ashkut | Kani Bagh | Kani Bardeh | Kani Bey | Kani Bodagh | Kani Dastar | Kani Deraz | Kani Eshkut | Kani Gorgeh | Kani Guz | Kani Guzlah | Kani Kaleh | Kani Kasil | Kani Kisalan | Kani Kowtar | Kani Mam Seyyed | Kani Miran | Kani Miran | Kani Molla | Kani Pankeh Qajer | Kani Qaleh | Kani Quzan | Kani Rash | Kani Rash | Kani Rash | Kani Rash | Kani Rash | Kani Sabzeh | Kani Sanjud | Kani Sefid | Kani Sefid | Kani Shaqaqan | Kani Shinka | Kani Shurik | Kani Shurik | Kani Sib | Kani Sib | Kani Siran | Kani Siv | Kani Sorkh | Kani Tayer | Kani Tumar | Kani Zard | Kanian | Kanisi | Kaniyeh Sar | Kapaleh Hasan | Kapeh Kand | Kapik | Kaput | Karag | Karan | Karan-e Olya | Karan-e Sofla | Karan-e Vasat | Karbalay Baqer Kandi | Karikan | Karimabad | Karimabad | Karimabad | Karimabad | Karkush | Karvan Qoran | Karvansara | Karvansara | Kaseb | Kasehgaran | Kashtiban | Kasian | Kasian | Kasureh Deh | Katban | Katenluy-e Olya | Katenluy-e Sofla | Kavalaq | Kavelan-e Olya | Kavelan-e Sofla | Kavis | Kavlaneh | Kavsi | Kavzhan | Kay | Kayer | Kazheh | Kechah Bash | Kelah Rash-e Bala | Kelah Rash-e Pain | Kelasi | Kelijeh | Kelisa | Kelisay-e Sir | Kerkereh | Kesharkhi | Keshavarz | Keshkavij | Keshmesh Tappeh | Keshtaz | Kesis | Key Salan | Khak Mardan | Khal Dalil | Khalaj | Khalaj-e Ajam | Khalaj-e Kord | Khaldar | Khaledabad | Khaledabad | Khalifan | Khalifan | Khalifatan | Khalifeh | Khalifehlu | Khalisan | Khalkhaleh | Khalvat | Khalyan | Khan Amir | Khan Baghalachi | Khan Kandi | Khan Qoli | Khan Takhti | Khanaqah | Khandizaj | Khan-e Sadr | Khanegah | Khaneh Dam | Khaneh Khal-e Olya | Khaneh Khal-e Sofla | Khaneqah Sorkh | Khaneqah | Khaneqah | Khaneqah | Khaneqah | Khaneqah-e Khangeh | Khaneshan | Khanik | Khanik | Khanjar Khan | Khanjar Qeshlaqi | Khankhaneh | Khanqah-e Alvaj | Kharabeh-ye Senji | Kharah Gush | Kharapa | Khareh Bardashan | Kharehju | Khareh-ye Aghlan | Khareh-ye Chaki | Khari Aghlan | Kharkhar | Kharmanyeri | Khatai | Khataylu | Khatunabad | Khatunasti | Khatunbagh | Khatunkhas | Khazai-ye Olya | Khazai-ye Sofla | Khazineh Anbar-e Jadid | Khazineh Anbar-e Qadim | Khenavin | Kheyrabad | Khezerlu | Khezerlu | Khezr Qeshlaq | Khezrabad | Khodaverdi Khan Kandi | Khoranj | Khorasaneh | Khorramabad | Khorramabad | Khosrowabad | Khoy | Khuk | Khulineh | Khurasb | Khvajehlu | Khvor Khvoreh | Khvor Khvoreh | Khvor Khvoreh | Khvorablu | Khvoresht | Khvoshaku | Khvoshalan | Khvoyaman-e Jadid | Kichabad | Kifarabad | Kileh Sepyan | Kileh-ye Olya | Kitekeh | Kohneh Deh Dum | Kohneh Deh Shugai | Kohneh Deh | Kohneh Kach | Kohneh Lahijan | Kohneh Mollalar | Kohneh Qaleh | Kohneh Zuran | Kol Tappeh | Kolik | Kondoreh | Kord Kandi | Kord Kandi | Kord Kandi | Kord Kandi | Kord Neshin | Kordlar | Kormandar | Koshkzar | Kowlus | Kowtar | Kuchaluy-e Olya | Kuchaluy-e Sofla | Kuchameshk | Kuchek Atmish | Kuchek | Kudaleh | Kukeh | Kukhan | Kukiya | Kulabad | Kulakun | Kulgani | Kulij | Kulkeh Rash-e Olya | Kulkeh Rash-e Sofla | Kulseh-ye Olya | Kulseh-ye Sofla | Kum | Kuper | Kur Bonav | Kura Bolagh | Kura Bolagh | Kurabad | Kuran | Kuran | Kuraneh | Kuraneh | Kurani | Kureh Kani | Kureh-ye Olya | Kureh-ye Sofla | Kurgeh | Kuroshabad Brick Company | Kurteh Kavil | Kurti | Kurushabad | Kuseh Ahmad | Kuseh Kahriz | Kuseh Kandi | Kuseh Piri | Kuseh | Kuseh | Kusehabad | Kusehlar-e Olya | Kusehlar-e Sofla | Kushgeh Darreh | Kutalan | Kutanabad | Kutan-e Olya | Kuzdagan | Kuzehgaran | Kuzehrash

== L ==
Lachin | Lagaz | Laj | Lajani | Lak | Lakabad-e Olya | Lakben | Lalahluy-e Torab | Lalaklu | Laseh Golan | Lashenlu | Lashgiran | Lavashlu | Lavin | Lerni | Leylakabad | Leylaneh | Lilus | Lowlakan | Lowrzini | Lulakabad-e Olya | Lulakabad-e Sofla | Lulham | Lur

== M ==
Madlu | Mafaran | Mafi Kandi | Mahabad Agricultural Training Camp | Mahabad Culture and Technology Centre | Mahabad Industrial Estate | Mahabad | Mahargan Brick Company | Mahlezan | Mahmud Aghli | Mahmudabad | Mahmudabad | Mahmudabad | Mahmudabad | Mahmudabad | Mahmudabad-e Olya | Mahmudabad-e Sofla | Mahmudan | Main Bolagh | Majnun-e Olya | Majnun-e Sofla | Majruseh | Makhand | Makhin | Makhmur | Maku Kandi | Maku | Malekabad | Maleklu | Malham | Malham | Malhamlu | Malhamlu-ye Olya | Malhamlu-ye Sofla | Maluneh | Mam Heybeh | Mam Zineh | Mamadan | Mamahdel | Mamakan | Mamakan | Mamakavah | Mamalu | Mameh Kandi | Mamehvat | Mamesh Khan | Mameyand | Manbar | Mansur Kandi | Mansurabad | Mansurabad | Manuchehri | Maqbul | Maraghan | Marajul | Marakami | Marakan | Maraneh | Maraneh | Marangaluy-e Bozorg | Marangaluy-e Kuchek |Marganlar| Margan-e Azizabad | Margan-e Esmail Kandi | Margan-e Qadim | Margan-e Vasat | Margarash | Margaru | Margaseh | Marjanabad | Marnah | Marqesheh | Marvan Kandi | Mashhadi Kandi | Mashhadi Mirza Kandi | Mashkabad-e Olya | Mashkabad-e Sofla | Mashkan | Masjed | Mastakan | Mastakan | Mastanabad | Masudabad | Masueh | Masum Kandi | Mateh Kharpeh | Mavana | Mavanda | Mavlu | Mazanabad | Mazanabad | Mazeleh | Mazhgeh | Mazraeh | Mazraeh | Mazraeh | Mazraeh | Mazraeh-ye Nasrabad | Mazraeh-ye Owj Ovlar | Mazraeh-ye Shenatal-e Sofla | Mazraeh-ye Tahqiqati Tutun | Mazraeh-ye Tamarchin | Mehmandar | Meshik | Meskin | Meydan | Meydan-e Olya | Meydan-e Sofla | Meyvanah | Miandoab Industrial Estate | Miandoab | Miavaq | Mikalabad | Milan | Minas | Mingol | Mir Omar | Mir Sheykh Heydar | Mirabad | Mirabad | Mirabad | Mirabad | Mirabad | Mirabad | Mirabad | Mirabad | Mirabad | Mirajal | Mireh Deh | Miriseh | Mirshekarlu | Mirza Dulmaz | Mirza Hesam | Mirza Khalil | Mirza Nezam | Misheh Deh-e Olya | Misheh Deh-e Sofla | Mobarakabad | Moghanjuq | Moghul | Mohammad Aqa-ye Olya | Mohammad Aqa-ye Sofla | Mohammad Kandi | Mohammad Karim Kandi | Mohammad Salah | Mohammad Sheli | Mohammadabad | Mohammadabad | Mohammadqoli Qeshlaq | Mohammadyar | Mokhvor | Mokhvor | Molla Ahmad | Molla Basak | Molla Esmail | Molla Hasan | Molla Jonud | Molla Kandi | Molla Kandi | Molla Shahab ol Din | Molla Sheykh | Mollalar | Momlu | Moqaddam | Moqitalu | Morad Ali-ye Olya | Morad Ali-ye Sofla | Morad | Moradkandi | Moradkhanlu | Moradluy-e Olya | Moradluy-e Sofla | Moradluy-e Vosta | Moshirabad | Mostafaabad | Mowlik-e Olya | Mozaffarabad | Mozaffarabad | Mus | Musalan | Museh | Mushabad | Mushandarreh

== N ==
Nabi Kandi | Nabi Kandi | Nabiabad | Nabikandi | Nachit | Nader Goli | Naderabad | Najafabad | Najibabad | Najjar | Nakhjavan Tappeh | Nalas | Nalband | Nalivan | Nalus | Naluseh | Naminjeh | Nanas | Naqadeh | Narast | Nari | Nari | Narlar | Narziveh | Nashgulan | Nasir Kandi | Nasirabad | Navai | Navar | Naybin | Nazar Khan | Nazarabad Qaleh | Nazarabad | Nazarabad-e Eftekhar | Nazhaveh | Nazlu | Naznaz | Nazok-e Olya | Nazok-e Sofla | Nergi | Nestan | Neychalan | Neysakabad | Neyzeh-ye Olya | Neyzeh-ye Sofla | Nezamabad | Nezamabad | Niaz | Nisakabad | Niskabad | Nivash | Nivlu | Nokhowd Darreh | Nokhtalu | Nosratabad | Nowbar | Nowkan | Nowkardar | Nowruzabad | Nowruzlu | Nowruzlu | Nuaveh | Nuchavan | Nur ol Dinabad | Nurabad | Nushan-e Olya | Nushan-e Sofla | Nushin | Nuy

== O ==
Ojaqabad | Omarabad | Ordushahi | Oruj Kandi | Oruj-e Mohammad Kandi | Oshnavieh Industrial Estate | Oshnavieh | Oshnuzang | Oskandrian | Osman Owlan | Ostunrash | Ostureh | Otaqlu | Owali | Owbeh Bolaghi | Owch Darreh | Owch Ovlar | Owghan | Owkhchilar | Owkhsar | Owlamchi | Owlaq | Owsaluy-e Allahverdi Khan | Owsaluy-e Kazem | Owzarlu | Owzun Qeshlaq

== P ==
Pahlavan | Pain Darreh | Paizabad | Pakajik | Panah Kandi | Panj Tan-e Shahid | Panjarlu | Par | Parastan | Parchi | Pareh-ye Olya | Pareh-ye Sofla | Parvaneh | Parvizabad | Pasak-e Sofla | Pash Bolagh | Pashbard | Pashqobran | Pasveh | Patah Vir | Pazhbard | Pazik | Pekachuk | Pekajik | Pelkeh | Pesan | Peshkeleh | Petaklu | Pey Qaleh | Peyrutabad | Pichaqchi | Pih Jik | Pileh Savar | Pir Ahmad Kandi | Pir Baha ol Din | Pir Kandi | Pir Mikail | Pir Morad | Pir Musa | Pir Yadegar | Pirali | Piranjuq | Piranshahr Garrison | Piranshahr Industrial Estate | Piranshahr Sugar Factory | Piranshahr | Pirgol | Pirhadi | Pirkani | Pirmand | Pirvali Baghi | Poldasht | Posht-e Gol | Post | Poultry 28 | Pulyeh | Purnak | Pushabad

== Q ==
Qabagh Kandi | Qabakh Tappeh | Qaban Kandi | Qabar Hoseyn | Qaderabad | Qaderabad | Qaderqamu | Qadim | Qadu Kandi | Qahraman | Qahreman Kandi | Qahremanluy-e Olya | Qahremanluy-e Sofla | Qajer | Qalanj Lanmesh | Qalat | Qalat | Qalat | Qalat-e Senan | Qalateh Rash | Qalatian | Qalaychi | Qaleh Bozorg | Qaleh Jugheh | Qaleh Juq | Qaleh Juq | Qaleh Juq | Qaleh Juq | Qaleh Juq | Qaleh Juq | Qaleh Juqeh | Qaleh Khach | Qaleh Lar | Qaleh Qurineh | Qaleh Rash | Qaleh Rasul Seyat | Qaleh Samur | Qaleh Sardar | Qaleh-ye Azizbeyg | Qaleh-ye Esmail Aqa | Qaleh-ye Seyyed Ahmad | Qaleh-ye Tasian | Qalilu | Qalqachi | Qalqanlu | Qalui Zendan | Qaluy Rasul Aqa | Qaluy Sheykhan | Qamat | Qameshkan-e Olya | Qameshkan-e Sofla | Qameshlu | Qamisheh | Qamishlu | Qamtareh | Qanat-e Baqer Beyk | Qanat-e Mirza Jalil | Qapi-ye Baba Ali | Qarabqolu | Qaraguz-e Hajji Baba | Qaraguz-e Salimaqa | Qarah Aghaj | Qarah Aghaj | Qarah Aghaj | Qarah Aghaj-e Olya | Qarah Aghol | Qarah Ayaq | Qarah Baba | Qarah Bagh | Qarah Baraz | Qarah Bolagh | Qarah Bolagh | Qarah Bolagh | Qarah Chelan | Qarah Dagh | Qarah Dagh | Qarah Dash | Qarah Gol | Qarah Hasanlu | Qarah Hasanlu-ye Khvajeh Pasha | Qarah Jalu | Qarah Kahriz | Qarah Kahriz | Qarah Kandi | Qarah Khan | Qarah Khezer | Qarah Khvojalu | Qarah Omar | Qarah Qach | Qarah Qassab | Qarah Qayah | Qarah Qayeh | Qarah Qeshlaq | Qarah Qeshlaq | Qarah Qiz | Qarah Qowyun | Qarah Qush-e Olya | Qarah Qush-e Sofla | Qarah Quyunlu | Qarah Soqol | Qarah Tappeh Railway Station | Qarah Tappeh | Qarah Tappeh | Qarah Tappeh | Qarah Tappeh | Qarah Tulki-ye Olya | Qarah Zamin | Qarah Zia od Din | Qarahchi Bolagh | Qarahjah Veran-e Olya | Qarahjah Veran-e Sofla | Qarajalu | Qarajelu | Qaralar-e Aqataqi | Qaralar-e Hajjqasem | Qaralar-e Kuh | Qaralar-e Lotfollah | Qaralar-e Tasuji | Qarali | Qaraneh | Qaranjeh | Qaranqu | Qaravolkhaneh | Qarayi | Qareh Aghaj | Qareh Bolagh-e Olya | Qareh Bolagh-e Sofla | Qareh Bughaz | Qareh Gol | Qareh Guz-e Il | Qareh Jalu | Qareh Kand | Qareh Kelisa | Qareh Khaj | Qareh Papaq | Qareh Qowyunlu | Qareh Qowzlu | Qareh Saqqal | Qareh Shaban | Qareh Tappeh | Qareh Ughlan | Qareh Zagh | Qarenjeh-ye Bozorg | Qarenjeh-ye Kuchek | Qarna | Qarnesa | Qarquluq-e Olya | Qarquluq-e Sofla | Qarvchah-e Olya | Qarvchah-e Sofla | Qaryaghdi | Qasemlu | Qashqa Bolagh | Qashqa Bolagh-e Sofla | Qasrik | Qasrik | Qasrik | Qasrik | Qasrik | Qasrik-e Olya | Qasrik-e Sofla | Qatanqor | Qatar Dash | Qatar | Qatur | Qatur | Qavaqlu | Qayan Kandi | Qazan Ali | Qazan Sar | Qazan | Qazanabad | Qazanlu | Qazi Akhavi | Qaziabad | Qazlian | Qazqapan | Qazrabad | Qelij | Qelinjlu | Qepchaq | Qerekhlu | Qeris | Qerkh Bolagh | Qerkh Yashar | Qerkhlu | Qermez Khalifeh-ye Olya | Qermez Khalifeh-ye Sofla | Qermezdash | Qermezi Bolagh | Qeshlaq | Qeshlaq-e Bahluleh | Qeshlaq-e Bakhtiar | Qeshlaq-e Hajji Hasan | Qeshlaq-e Hajji Shahab | Qeshlaq-e Mirza Ali | Qeshlaq-e Mohammad Qoli | Qeshlaq-e Namu | Qeshlaq-e Nowruzlu | Qeshlaq-e Shakur | Qeshlaq-e Talkhab | Qeshlaq-e Tarazlu | Qeshlaq-e Zeynal Kandi | Qeshquneh-ye Olya | Qeshquneh-ye Sofla | Qeyqaj | Qez Qaleh | Qez Qaleh | Qezel Aghol | Qezel Arkh-e Olya | Qezel Arkh-e Sofla | Qezel Asheq | Qezel Bolagh | Qezel Dagh-e Ajam | Qezel Dagh-e Kord | Qezel Dash-e Olya | Qezel Dash-e Sofla | Qezel Gonbad | Qezel Hajjilu | Qezel Kand | Qezel Qabr | Qezel Qapi | Qezel Qayeh-ye Olya | Qezel Qayeh-ye Sofla | Qezel Qayeh-ye Vosta | Qezel Qeshlaq | Qezel Suri | Qezeljah | Qezeljeh Gol | Qezeljeh | Qezeljeh-ye Sofla | Qezkhachlu | Qiasi | Qilehliq | Qinar-e Olya | Qinar-e Sofla | Qinarjeh | Qinarjeh | Qir Kandi | Qiz Korpi | Qiz Ulan | Qobad Beygi | Qodrat Kandi | Qojiabad | Qojur | Qol Hasan | Qoldarreh-ye Olya | Qoldarreh-ye Sofla | Qoli Dizaji | Qoljeh Tappeh | Qolqoleh | Qom Qeshlaq | Qomqaleh | Qoroqchi | Qosur | Qotlu | Qoturlar | Qowzlojeh | Qowzlujeh | Qubeh | Quch Kandi | Quchali | Quchash | Qujeh | Qulanjeq | Qular | Qular | Quleh Savir | Qulonji | Qulteh | Quni | Qur Chaveh | Qur Shaqlu | Qurd ol Duran-e Ajam | Qurd ol Duran-e Kord | Qurdarik-e Olya | Qurdarik-e Sofla | Qurghan | Quri Bolagh | Quri Daraq | Qurishkak | Qurmik | Qurmish | Qurniav-e Sofla | Qurqan | Qurshalu | Qurshaqlu | Qurshaqlui-ye Kord | Qurt Tappeh | Qurul-e Olya | Qurul-e Sofla | Quruq | Qush | Qusha Bolagh | Qusha Bolagh-e Olya | Qusha Bolagh-e Sofla | Qushchi | Qushkhaneh-ye Olya | Qutan | Quyjeq | Quytal | Quyujoq | Quzlujeh | Quzluy-e Afshar | Quzluy-e Khaniyeh | Quzluy-e Olya | Quzluy-e Olya | Quzluy-e Sofla | Quzluy-e Sofla

== R ==
Rabat | Rabat | Rafteh | Rah Daneh | Rahal | Rahim Khan | Rahimabad | Rahimabad | Rajakeh | Rasheh Hormeh | Rashgund | Rashkan | Rashkan-e Sofla | Rasulabad | Ravand | Ravand-e Olya | Ravand-e Sofla | Ravaz | Ravyan | Razgah | Razgeh | Razhan | Razi | Rend | Reyhanabad | Reyhanluy-e Olya | Reyhanluy-e Sofla | Reyhanluy-e Vosta | Reza Qeshlaq | Rezgari | Rigabad | Rigabad | Rigabad | Rikan

== S ==
Saatluy Kuh | Saatluy-e Beyglar | Sabil | Sabzi | Sadal | Sadaqeh | Sadaqian | Sadr ol Din | Sadr | Safa Khaneh | Safarbehi | Safarqoli Khan Kandi | Safiar Khan | Safu | Sahulan | Saidabad | Saidabad | Saidabad | Saidabad | Saidlu | Sakan | Sakhasi Tappeh | Sakhteman | Sakhteman | Salamat | Salband | Salehabad | Salehabad | Salim Beyg | Salim Kandi | Salim Saghul | Salkadeh | Salkatan | Salm | Salmanabad | Salmas | Salus | Sam Salu | Samad Yurdi | Samartu | Saminu | Sandulan | Sangar | Sangar | Sangar-e Mir Abdollah | Sanjaleh | Sanjaq | Sanjud | Sanjuh | Saqqezlu | Sar Baghcheh | Sar Darreh | Sar Giz | Sar Tang | Sarab | Sarabdal | Sarab-e Rahim Khan | Sarajuq | Saralan | Saral-e Olya | Saral-e Sofla | Saray-e Malek | Sarchaveh | Sarchaveh | Sarchenar | Sard Kuhestan | Sardarabad | Sardasht | Sardrud | Sarem Saqlu | Sarenj | Sarhulan | Sari Bagh | Sari Beygluy-e Araliq | Sari Beygluy-e Cheragh | Sari Beygluy-e Moin | Sari Beygluy-e Musai | Sari Ojaq | Sari Qomish | Sari Qomish-e Qeshlaq | Sari Qurkhan | Sari Su | Sarijalu | Sarijalu | Sarilabad | Sarmargan Naleyn | Sarnaq | Sarshiv | Sartakeh | Sartan | Sartiz | Sarujeh-ye Olya | Sarujeh-ye Sofla | Sarv Kani | Sarv | Sarvaneh | Satelmish-e Mohammadabad | Satelmish-e Mohammadlu | Satelmish-e Tupkhaneh | Satlu | Savan | Savan-e Jadid | Savinas | Sayenjeq | Sayyet Askan Ashayir Milad | Sazaghol | Sefid Marmar Plaster Company | Segrik | Seh Gerdekan | Seh Kani | Seh Vatal | Sehgergan | Selakeh | Seneq | Sengan | Senji | Senji | Senjilik | Sepidareh | Sepidareh-ye Darmeh | Serin Chaveh | Serow | Sevarin | Seybian | Seydan | Seyf ol Din-e Olya | Seyf ol Din-e Sofla | Seylaneh | Seyyed Taj ol Din | Seyyedabad | Seyyedabad | Seyyedabad-e Qajer | Shaban Kandi | Shabanlu | Shabanluy-e Olya | Shabanluy-e Sofla | Shabiluy-e Olya | Shabiluy-e Sofla | Shadluy-e Olya | Shadluy-e Sofla | Shahid Ab Shanasan Garrison | Shahid Mohammad Rauf | Shahin Dezh | Shahinabad | Shahinabad | Shahrak-e Aras | Shahrak-e Dilzeh Makan Mastaqol | Shahrak-e Golmarz | Shahrak-e Mehdi | Shahrak-e Rustayi-ye Naser | Shahrak-e Sadd-e Nowruzlu | Shahrak-e Shahid Rezavani-ye Lakben | Shahrak-e Uch Tappeh-ye Kord | Shahrak-e Ziveh | Shahr-e Viran | Shahr-e Zur | Shahrestan | Shahrikand | Shahvaneh | Shakhtan | Shaklabad | Shakur Kandi | Shalehsiv | Shalgeh | Shaliabad | Shalimjaran | Shalman | Shalmash | Shameh Sheykheh | Shamlakan | Shamrin | Shams-e Hajjian | Shamuleh | Shamusilabi | Shandarreh | Sharafkand | Shareh Khvor | Sharif Kandi | Sharif ol Din | Sharifabad | Sharifabad | Sharifabad | Shater | Shatman | Shaveleh | Shegaftik-e Olya | Shegaftik-e Sofla | Shegofti | Shekar Beg | Shekar Bolaghi-ye Olya | Shekar Yazi | Shenatal-e Olya | Shetow | Sheyban | Sheybluy-e Olya | Sheybluy-e Sofla | Sheydan | Sheykh Ahmad | Sheykh Ali | Sheykh Maruf | Sheykh Mazari | Sheykh Osman | Sheykh Saluy-e Olya | Sheykh Saluy-e Sofla | Sheykh Sar Mast | Sheykh Selu | Sheykh Shamzin | Sheykh Teymur | Sheykh Yusof | Sheykh Zard | Sheykhan | Sheykhan | Sheykhlar | Shibaneh | Shidi | Shilanabad | Shinabad | Shinabad | Shinu | Shir Mard | Shir Mohammad | Shirabad | Shirah Ki | Shirakan | Shirakan | Shirani | Shirani | Shirin Ab | Shirin Bolagh | Shirin Bolagh | Shirin Kandi | Shiru Kandi | Shirvani | Shivan Kandi | Shivashan | Shivashan | Shivavakan | Shiveh Berow | Shiveh Mer | Shiveh Sal | Shiveh | Shivehju | Shokrabad | Shotlu | Showt | Shunqar | Shur Ab | Shur Bolagh | Shur Bolagh | Shur Gel | Shur Kahriz | Shur Kand | Shura Kandi | Shurabad | Shuraq Gol | Shurbolagh-e Olya | Shurbolagh-e Sofla | Shurik | Shurik | Shurik | Shurjeh Baruq | Shurjeh Kord | Shurjeh | Si Pakan | Si Sar | Siah Baz | Siah Cheshmeh | Siaqul-e Olya | Siaqul-e Sofla | Siarak | Siavan | Siavan | Sichan Bolaghi | Sidak | Silab | Silvaneh | Silveh | Simmineh | Sinabad | Sinur | Sir | Siran | Sireh Marg | Sistak-e Olya | Sivan | Siveh Dar | Siveh Kadeh-ye Olya | Siveh Kadeh-ye Sofla | Sogotlu | Soleyman Aghol | Soleyman Kandi | Soleymanabad | Soltan Ahmad | Soltanabad | Soltanabad | Soltani | Soluk | Soluklu | Sombeh | Sona Bolagh | Sonnat-e Olya | Sonnat-e Sofla | Sopurghan | Sorkhab | Soviru | Sowghanchi | Sowghanlu | Sowgoli Tappeh | Sudinabad | Sufali | Sufi Kandi | Sufi Kani | Sufi | Sufiabad | Sufiabad-e Sofla | Sufian | Sufian | Sujeh | Suleh Dugal | Sulgheh | Sulik | Suneh | Surbani | Sureh Chum | Sureh | Surehban | Surik | Surkan | Surmanabad | Susanabad | Susanabad | Sustan-e Sofla | Sutavan

== T ==
Tabbat | Tabbat | Tabieh | Taglak | Taherabad | Taherabad | Tahmaseb Kandi | Taj Khatun | Tajdu | Tajoldinabad | Tak Aghaj | Takab | Takah | Takalu | Takan Tappeh | Takht-e Ravan-e Olya | Takht-e Ravan-e Sofla | Takhteh Duz | Tala Tappeh | Taleqan | Talin | Talkhab | Tamar | Tamay | Tamrabad | Tamtaman | Tandarak | Tang-e Balekeh | Tapi | Tapik | Tappeh Bashi | Tappeh Bashi-ye Namaz | Tappeh Bashi-ye Purnak | Tappeh Bur | Tappeh Maki | Tappeh Rash | Tappeh Saremi | Tappeh Torkaman | Tappeh | Tappeh-ye Babaganjeh | Taqi Kandi | Taqlidabad | Tarakmeh | Taraqeh | Tarimish | Tark Darreh | Tark-e Viran | Tarkesh Coffee Company | Tarkesh-e Olya | Tarkesh-e Sofla | Tarmakchi | Tarmani | Tarsabad | Tarseh Bolagh | Tarshian | Tarzelu | Tas Kand | Tasheh Kabud | Tasmalu | Tat Kandi | Tatar | Tavan | Tavarreh | Tavreh | Tazeh Kand | Tazeh Kand | Tazeh Kand | Tazeh Kand | Tazeh Kand | Tazeh Kand | Tazeh Kand | Tazeh Kand | Tazeh Kand-e Adaghan | Tazeh Kand-e Afshar | Tazeh Kand-e Anhar | Tazeh Kand-e Baba Ganjeh | Tazeh Kand-e Deym | Tazeh Kand-e Hajj Hasan | Tazeh Kand-e Hasel-e Qubi | Tazeh Kand-e Jabal | Tazeh Kand-e Jamalkhan | Tazeh Kand-e Janizeh | Tazeh Kand-e Lalaklu | Tazeh Kand-e Nosratabad | Tazeh Kand-e Qaterchi | Tazeh Kand-e Qeshlaq | Tazeh Kand-e Sheshmal | Tazeh Qaleh | Tazeh Qaleh | Tazeh Qaleh | Tazeh Shahr | Tazehabad | Tazehkand | Tazehkand | Tazhandareh | Teghnit-e Olya | Teghnit-e Vasat | Tekanlujeh | Tey 25 Pashahid Hoseyn Shahram Far | Teymurabad | Tez Kharab | Tezkharab | Tibatan | Tikmah Ajam | Tikmeh Kord | Tit-e Olya | Tizkharab | Tizkharab | Tolimkhan-e Olya | Tolimkhan-e Sofla | Tondarlu | Torkaman Kandi | Torkaman | Torkan | Torkasheh | Tormish | Torshakan | Towlaki | Tubozabad | Tudan | Tui | Tuli | Tulkan | Tulki Tappehsi | Tumar Aghaj | Tumatar | Tupraq Qaleh | Tupuzabad | Tupuzabad | Tupuzabad | Tut Aghaj | Tuveh | Tuzhal | Tuzhaleh

== U ==
Uch Tappeh | Uch Tappeh-ye Kord | Uch Tappeh-ye Qaleh | Ughul Beyg | Ulanlar | Ureban | Urmia Airport | Urmia Industrial Estate | Urmia | Urta Daraq | Urta Kand | Urtanis | Utmish | Uynehchi | Uzan Eskandari | Uzan Malek | Uzan-e Olya | Uzan-e Sofla | Uzun Darreh-ye Olya | Uzun Darreh-ye Sofla | Uzun Owbeh | Uzuntash

== V ==
Vakil | Valdian | Vali Kandi | Valiabad | Valindeh-ye Olya | Valindeh-ye Sofla | Valiv | Vandai | Vaqasluy-e Olya | Vaqasluy-e Sofla | Var | Varagol | Varchak | Vardan | Vardeh | Varik | Varmazyar | Varmazyar | Varmishan | Vashmazin | Vatmanabad | Vavan | Vazirabad | Vazneh | Vishlaq-e Olya | Vishlaq-e Sofla

== Y ==
Yadabad-e Olya | Yadabad-e Sofla | Yadegarlu | Yaghian | Yaghmur Ali | Yaharlu | Yalaklu | Yalquz Aghaj | Yaqin Ali Tappeh | Yaqub Ali Kandi | Yaqush | Yar Ali | Yar Paqlu | Yaraziz | Yarem Qayah-e Olya | Yarem Qayah-e Sofla | Yarem Qayah-e Vasat | Yarijan-e Khaleseh | Yarijan-e Olya | Yarijan-e Sofla | Yarim Qayeh | Yasi Kand | Yasinabad | Yasti Kand | Yatim Aghli | Yaychi | Yazdekan | Yekhelqan | Yekmaleh-ye Sofla | Yekshaveh | Yeli Bolagh | Yengejeh | Yengejeh | Yengejeh | Yengejeh | Yengejeh | Yengejeh-ye Qazi | Yengi Kand | Yengi Kand | Yengi Kand | Yengi Orkh | Yengiabad | Yengijeh | Yolqun Aghaj |Yowla Galdi| Yowrqanlu | Yowrqanlu-ye Janizeh | Yumoridash | Yuneslu | Yunjaliq | Yurqunabad-e Olya | Yurqunabad-e Sofla | Yusef Gol | Yusef Kandi | Yusef Kandi | Yusefabad | Yusefabad | Yusefabad-e Shah Mirza Kandi | Yushanlu | Yusof Kandi | Yuvalar

== Z ==
Zabaka | Zadehlu | Zagadrav | Zagheh | Zagheh | Zaher Kandi | Zaiyeh Kandi | Zakerlu | Zalavan | Zaleh | Zamanabad | Zamziran | Zangabad | Zangabad | Zangakan | Zanganeh | Zangelan-e Olya | Zangelan-e Sofla | Zangiabad | Zanglan | Zangu | Zanjirabad | Zanjireh | Zaranji | Zarean | Zareh Marg | Zareh Shuran | Zarrin Darreh | Zavehkuh | Zaviyeh | Zaviyeh-e Hasan Khan | Zaviyeh-e Sheykh Lar | Zaviyeh-ye Olya | Zaviyeh-ye Sofla | Zel Keh-ye Olya | Zel Keh-ye Sofla | Zelilan | Zemeh | Zendeh Qul | Zenharkandi | Zeri | Zeyd Kandi | Zeydan | Zeynal Kandi | Zeynalu | Zeynalu | Zharabad | Zharabad | Zharazhi | Zhazhukeh | Zindasht | Zinuay Jian | Zir Andul | Zirmanlu | Ziveh Jik | Ziveh | Ziveh | Ziveh | Ziveh | Ziveh | Ziveh | Ziveh-ye Qureh | Zonbalan | Zovik | Zula | Zurabad | Zurabad | Zuran
