= Zangakan =

Zangakan زنگكان
- Village
- Location within Iran
- Coordinates: 37°44′55″N 44°48′11″E
- Country: Iran
- Province: West Azerbaijan
- County: Urmia
- Bakhsh: Sumay-ye Beradust
- Rural District: Beradust

Population (2006)
  - Total: 138
- Time zone: UTC+3:30 (IRST)
  - Summer (DST): UTC+4:30 (IRDT)

Zangakan (Persian: زنگكان, also Romanized as Zangakān; also known as Zangagān) is a village in northwestern Iran, in Beradust Rural District, Sumay-ye Beradust District, Urmia County, West Azerbaijan Province. At the 2006 census, its population was 138, in 21 families.
