= Daylaq =

Daylaq دايلاق
- Village
- Location within Iran
- Coordinates: 37°37′58″N 45°05′23″E
- Country: Iran
- Province: West Azerbaijan
- County: Urmia
- Bakhsh: Central
- Rural District: Nazluy-ye Jonubi

Population (2006)
  - Total: 77
- Time zone: UTC+3:30 (IRST)
  - Summer (DST): UTC+4:30 (IRDT)

Daylaq (Persian: دايلاق, also Romanized as Dāylāq) is a village in Nazluy-ye Jonubi Rural District, in the Central District of Urmia County, West Azerbaijan Province, Iran. At the 2006 census, its population was 77, in 17 families.
