= Qurmik =

Qurmik قورميك
- Village
- Location within Iran
- Coordinates: 37°56′33″N 44°38′36″E
- Country: Iran
- Province: West Azerbaijan
- County: Urmia
- Bakhsh: Sumay-ye Beradust
- Rural District: Sumay-ye Shomali

Population (2006)
  - Total: 262
- Time zone: UTC+3:30 (IRST)
  - Summer (DST): UTC+4:30 (IRDT)

Qurmik (Persian: قورميك, also Romanized as Qūrmīk) is a village in Sumay-ye Shomali Rural District, Sumay-ye Beradust District, Urmia County, West Azerbaijan Province, Iran. At the 2006 census, its population was 262, in 48 families.
