= Tamtaman =

Tamtaman تمتمان
- Village
- Location within Iran
- Coordinates: 37°40′08″N 44°55′03″E
- Country: Iran
- Province: West Azerbaijan
- County: Urmia
- Bakhsh: Nazlu
- Rural District: Nazluchay

Population (2006)
  - Total: 99
- Time zone: UTC+3:30 (IRST)
  - Summer (DST): UTC+4:30 (IRDT)

Tamtaman (Persian: تمتمان, also Romanized as Tamtamān) is a village in Nazluchay Rural District, Nazlu District, Urmia County, West Azerbaijan Province, Iran. At the 2006 census, its population was 99, in 16 families.
