= Bolarghu =

Bolarghu بلارغو
- Village
- Location within Iran
- Coordinates: 37°57′26″N 44°53′44″E
- Country: Iran
- Province: West Azerbaijan
- County: Urmia
- Bakhsh: Anzal
- Rural District: Anzal-e Jonubi

Population (2006)
  - Total: 321
- Time zone: UTC+3:30 (IRST)
  - Summer (DST): UTC+4:30 (IRDT)

Bolarghu (Persian: بلارغو, also Romanized as Bolārghū) is a village in Anzal-e Jonubi Rural District, Anzal District, Urmia County, West Azerbaijan Province, Iran. At the 2006 census, its population was 321, in 60 families.
