= Kusehabad =

Kusehabad كوسه اباد
- Village
- Location within Iran
- Coordinates: 37°26′56″N 45°11′16″E
- Country: Iran
- Province: West Azerbaijan
- County: Urmia
- Bakhsh: Central
- Rural District: Torkaman

Population (2006)
  - Total: 198
- Time zone: UTC+3:30 (IRST)
  - Summer (DST): UTC+4:30 (IRDT)

Kusehabad (Persian: كوسه اباد, also Romanized as Kūsehābād) is a village in Torkaman Rural District, in the Central District of Urmia County, West Azerbaijan Province, Iran. At the 2006 census, its population was 198, in 51 families.
