= Basrik =

Basrik بصريك
- Village
- Location within Iran
- Coordinates: 37°37′13″N 44°40′39″E
- Country: Iran
- Province: West Azerbaijan
- County: Urmia
- Bakhsh: Silvaneh
- Rural District: Targavar

Population (2006)
  - Total: 142
- Time zone: UTC+3:30 (IRST)
  - Summer (DST): UTC+4:30 (IRDT)

Basrik (Persian: بصريك, also Romanized as Başrīk; also known as Bīsrak) is a village in Targavar Rural District, Silvaneh District, Urmia County, West Azerbaijan Province, Iran. At the 2006 census, its population was 142, in 25 families.
