= Golmankhaneh =

Golmankhaneh گلمانخانه
- Village
- Location within Iran
- Coordinates: 37°35′55″N 45°14′29″E
- Country: Iran
- Province: West Azerbaijan
- County: Urmia
- Bakhsh: Central
- Rural District: Bakeshluchay

Population (2006)
  - Total: 158
- Time zone: UTC+3:30 (IRST)
  - Summer (DST): UTC+4:30 (IRDT)

Golmankhaneh (Persian: گلمانخانه, also Romanized as Golmānkhāneh; also known as Bandar Golmānkhāneh) is a village in Bakeshluchay Rural District, in the Central District of Urmia County, West Azerbaijan Province, Iran. At the 2006 census, its population was 158, in 50 families.
