= Saidlu =

Saidlu سعيدلو
- Village
- Location within Iran
- Coordinates: 37°39′33″N 45°06′18″E
- Country: Iran
- Province: West Azerbaijan
- County: Urmia
- Bakhsh: Central
- Rural District: Nazluy-ye Jonubi

Population (2006)
  - Total: 245
- Time zone: UTC+3:30 (IRST)
  - Summer (DST): UTC+4:30 (IRDT)

Saidlu (Persian: سعيدلو, also Romanized as Sa‘īdlū) is a village in Nazluy-ye Jonubi Rural District, in the Central District of Urmia County, West Azerbaijan Province, Iran. At the 2006 census, its population was 245, in 72 families.
