= Qarayi, West Azerbaijan =

Qarayi قرایی
- Village
- Location within Iran
- Coordinates: 37°29′00″N 44°48′00″E
- Country: Iran
- Province: West Azerbaijan
- County: Urmia
- Bakhsh: Silvaneh
- Rural District: Dasht

Population (2006)
  - Total: 96
- Time zone: UTC+3:30 (IRST)
  - Summer (DST): UTC+4:30 (IRDT)

Qarayi (Persian: قرایی, also Romanized as Qarāyī; also known as Qareh Evlī) is a village in Dasht Rural District, Silvaneh District, Urmia County, West Azerbaijan Province, Iran. At the 2006 census, its population was 96, in 17 families.
