= Salim Beyg =

Salim Beyg سليم بيگ
- Village
- Location within Iran
- Coordinates: 37°24′40″N 44°55′36″E
- Country: Iran
- Province: West Azerbaijan
- County: Urmia
- Bakhsh: Silvaneh
- Rural District: Dasht

Population (2006)
  - Total: 218
- Time zone: UTC+3:30 (IRST)
  - Summer (DST): UTC+4:30 (IRDT)

Salim Beyg (Persian: سليم بيگ, also Romanized as Salīm Beyg) is a village in Dasht Rural District, Silvaneh District, Urmia County, West Azerbaijan Province, Iran. At the 2006 census, its population was 218, in 38 families.
