= Moradkandi =

Moradkandi مرادكندي
- Village
- Location within Iran
- Coordinates: 37°23′51″N 45°15′22″E
- Country: Iran
- Province: West Azerbaijan
- County: Urmia
- Bakhsh: Central
- Rural District: Torkaman

Population (2006)
  - Total: 80
- Time zone: UTC+3:30 (IRST)
  - Summer (DST): UTC+4:30 (IRDT)

Moradkandi (Persian: مرادكندي, also Romanized as Morādkandī) is a village in Torkaman Rural District, in the Central District of Urmia County, West Azerbaijan Province, Iran. At the 2006 census, its population was 80, in 22 families.
