= Guyj Ali Tappeh =

Goyjali Tappe تپه گؤیجه‌لی
- Village
- Location within Iran
- Coordinates: 37°38′33″N 45°09′02″E
- Country: Iran
- Province: West Azerbaijan
- County: Urmia
- Bakhsh: Central
- Rural District: Bash Qaleh

Population (2006)
  - Total: 27
- Time zone: UTC+3:30 (IRST)
  - Summer (DST): UTC+4:30 (IRDT)

Goyjali Tappe (Persian: گویجه‌لی‌تپه) (Azerbaijani: Təpə Göycəli تپه گؤیجه‌لی), also Romanized as Təpə Göycəli; also known as Gūyjeh ‘Alī Tappeh and Gūyjehlarī Tappeh) is a village in Bash Qala Rural District, in the Central District of Urmia County, West Azerbaijan Province, Iran. At the 2006 census, its population was 27, in 6 families.
