= Naznaz =

Naznaz نازناز
- Village
- Location within Iran
- Coordinates: 37°11′07″N 45°15′40″E
- Country: Iran
- Province: West Azerbaijan
- County: Urmia
- Bakhsh: Central
- Rural District: Dul

Population (2006)
  - Total: 335
- Time zone: UTC+3:30 (IRST)
  - Summer (DST): UTC+4:30 (IRDT)

Naznaz (Persian: نازناز, also Romanized as Nāznāz) is a village in Dul Rural District, in the Central District of Urmia County, West Azerbaijan Province, Iran. At the 2006 census, its population was 335, in 67 families.
