= Chavrash =

Chavrash چاورش
- Village
- Location within Iran
- Coordinates: 37°23′21″N 44°58′32″E
- Country: Iran
- Province: West Azerbaijan
- County: Urmia
- Bakhsh: Central
- Rural District: Baranduz

Population (2006)
  - Total: 265
- Time zone: UTC+3:30 (IRST)
  - Summer (DST): UTC+4:30 (IRDT)

Chavrash (Persian: چاورش, also Romanized as Chāvrash; also known as Chūres) is a village in Baranduz Rural District, in the Central District of Urmia County, West Azerbaijan Province, Iran. At the 2006 census, its population was 265, in 59 families.
