= Khurasb =

Khurasb خوراسب
- Village
- Location within Iran
- Coordinates: 37°11′10″N 44°57′01″E
- Country: Iran
- Province: West Azerbaijan
- County: Urmia
- Bakhsh: Silvaneh
- Rural District: Margavar

Population (2006)
  - Total: 394
- Time zone: UTC+3:30 (IRST)
  - Summer (DST): UTC+4:30 (IRDT)

Khurasb (Persian: خوراسب, also Romanized as Khūrāsb; also known as Khorāsb) is a village in Margavar Rural District, Silvaneh District, Urmia County, West Azerbaijan Province, Iran. At the 2006 census, its population was 394, in 59 families.
