= Safarbehi =

Safarbehi صفربهی
- Village
- Location within Iran
- Coordinates: 37°40′00″N 45°08′00″E
- Country: Iran
- Province: West Azerbaijan
- County: Urmia
- Bakhsh: Central
- Rural District: Bash Qaleh

Population (2006)
  - Total: 339
- Time zone: UTC+3:30 (IRST)
  - Summer (DST): UTC+4:30 (IRDT)

Safarbehi (Persian: صفربهی, also Romanized as Şafarbehī; also known as Behīşafar) is a village in Bash Qaleh Rural District, in the Central District of Urmia County, West Azerbaijan Province, Iran. At the 2006 census, its population was 339, in 101 families.
