= Gundak-e Molla =

Gundak-e Molla گوندك ملا
- Village
- Location within Iran
- Coordinates: 37°43′30″N 44°42′20″E
- Country: Iran
- Province: West Azerbaijan
- County: Urmia
- Bakhsh: Sumay-ye Beradust
- Rural District: Beradust

Population (2006)
  - Total: 198
- Time zone: UTC+3:30 (IRST)
  - Summer (DST): UTC+4:30 (IRDT)

Gundak-e Molla (Persian: گوندك ملا, also Romanized as Gūndak-e Mollā; also known as Gondak-e Mollā and Gondūk-e Mollā) is a village in Beradust Rural District, Sumay-ye Beradust District, Urmia County, West Azerbaijan Province, Iran. At the 2006 census, its population was 198, in 38 families.
