= Shiru Kandi =

Shiru Kandi شیروکندی
- Village
- Location within Iran
- Coordinates: 37°18′50″N 45°07′05″E
- Country: Iran
- Province: West Azerbaijan
- County: Urmia
- Bakhsh: Central
- Rural District: Baranduzchay-ye Jonubi

Population (2006)
  - Total: 112
- Time zone: UTC+3:30 (IRST)
  - Summer (DST): UTC+4:30 (IRDT)

Shiru Kandi (Persian: شیروکندی, also Romanized as Shīrū Kandī; also known as Sherekand and Shere-Kendy; in Armenian: Շիրական) is a village in Baranduzchay-ye Jonubi Rural District, in the Central District of Urmia County, West Azerbaijan Province, Iran. At the 2006 census, its population was 112, in 22 families.
