= Qeshlaq-e Mirza Ali =

Qeshlaq-e Mirza Ali قشلاق ميرزاعلي
- Village
- Location within Iran
- Coordinates: 37°33′06″N 45°14′46″E
- Country: Iran
- Province: West Azerbaijan
- County: Urmia
- Bakhsh: Central
- Rural District: Bakeshluchay

Population (2006)
  - Total: 112
- Time zone: UTC+3:30 (IRST)
  - Summer (DST): UTC+4:30 (IRDT)

Qeshlaq-e Mirza Ali (Persian: قشلاق ميرزاعلي, also Romanized as Qeshlāq-e Mīrzā ‘Alī and Qeshlāq-e Mīrzā‘alī) is a village in Bakeshluchay Rural District, in the Central District of Urmia County, West Azerbaijan Province, Iran. At the 2006 census, its population was 112, in 32 families.
