= Yowrqanlu-ye Janizeh =

Yowrqanlu-ye Janizeh يورقانلوي جنيزه
- Village
- Location within Iran
- Coordinates: 37°39′43″N 44°58′03″E
- Country: Iran
- Province: West Azerbaijan
- County: Urmia
- Bakhsh: Nazlu
- Rural District: Nazluchay

Population (2006)
  - Total: 114
- Time zone: UTC+3:30 (IRST)
  - Summer (DST): UTC+4:30 (IRDT)

Yowrqanlu-ye Janizeh (Persian: يورقانلوي جنيزه, also Romanized as Yowrqānlū-ye Janīzeh; also known as Yowrqānlū) is a village in Nazluchay Rural District, Nazlu District, Urmia County, West Azerbaijan Province, Iran. At the 2006 census, its population was 114, in 25 families.
