= Biquz =

Biquz بي قوز
- Village
- Location within Iran
- Coordinates: 37°37′31″N 44°43′26″E
- Country: Iran
- Province: West Azerbaijan
- County: Urmia
- Bakhsh: Silvaneh
- Rural District: Targavar

Population (2006)
  - Total: 59
- Time zone: UTC+3:30 (IRST)
  - Summer (DST): UTC+4:30 (IRDT)

Biquz (Persian: بي قوز, also Romanized as Bīqūz) is a village in Targavar Rural District, Silvaneh District, Urmia County, West Azerbaijan Province, Iran. At the 2006 census, its population was 59, in 9 families.
