= Gerdik Naser =

Gerdik Naser گرديك ناصر
- Village
- Location within Iran
- Coordinates: 37°17′55″N 44°54′45″E
- Country: Iran
- Province: West Azerbaijan
- County: Urmia
- Bakhsh: Silvaneh
- Rural District: Margavar

Population (2006)
  - Total: 301
- Time zone: UTC+3:30 (IRST)
  - Summer (DST): UTC+4:30 (IRDT)

Gerdik Naser (Persian: گرديك ناصر, also Romanized as Gerdīk Nāşer and Gerdīknāşer; also known as Gerdaknāşer) is a village in Margavar Rural District, Silvaneh District, Urmia County, West Azerbaijan Province, Iran. At the 2006 census, its population was 301, in 52 families.
