= Lashenlu =

Lashenlu لشنلو
- Village
- Location within Iran
- Coordinates: 37°31′14″N 45°12′23″E
- Country: Iran
- Province: West Azerbaijan
- County: Urmia
- Bakhsh: Central
- Rural District: Bakeshluchay

Population (2006)
  - Total: 132
- Time zone: UTC+3:30 (IRST)
  - Summer (DST): UTC+4:30 (IRDT)

Lashenlu (Persian: لشنلو, also Romanized as Lashenlū; also known as Lashīnlū) is a village in Bakeshluchay Rural District, in the Central District of Urmia County, West Azerbaijan Province, Iran. At the 2006 census, its population was 132, in 40 families.
