= Qazan Ali =

Qazan Ali قازان علی
- Village
- Location within Iran
- Coordinates: 37°41′11″N 45°08′56″E
- Country: Iran
- Province: West Azerbaijan
- County: Urmia
- Bakhsh: Central
- Rural District: Bash Qaleh

Population (2006)
  - Total: 119
- Time zone: UTC+3:30 (IRST)
  - Summer (DST): UTC+4:30 (IRDT)

Qazan Ali (Persian: قازان علی, also Romanized as Qāzān ‘Alī and Qāzān‘alī; also known as Qāzān Āghelī and Qāzān Oghlī) is a village in Bash Qaleh Rural District, in the Central District of Urmia County, West Azerbaijan Province, Iran. At the 2006 census, its population was 119, in 27 families.
