= Kani Tayer =

Kani Tayer كاني طاير
- Village
- Location within Iran
- Coordinates: 37°14′18″N 44°51′45″E
- Country: Iran
- Province: West Azerbaijan
- County: Urmia
- Bakhsh: Silvaneh
- Rural District: Margavar

Population (2006)
  - Total: 65
- Time zone: UTC+3:30 (IRST)
  - Summer (DST): UTC+4:30 (IRDT)

Kani Tayer (Persian: كاني طاير, also romanized as Kānī Ţāyer; also known as Kānī Tāber) is a village in Margavar Rural District, Silvaneh District, Urmia County, West Azerbaijan Province, Iran. At the 2006 census, its population was 65, in 10 families.
