= Uzan Malek =

Uzan Malek اوزان ملک
- Village
- Location within Iran
- Coordinates: 37°22′48″N 45°09′10″E
- Country: Iran
- Province: West Azerbaijan
- County: Urmia
- Bakhsh: Central
- Rural District: Baranduzchay-ye Jonubi

Population (2006)
  - Total: 475
- Time zone: UTC+3:30 (IRST)
  - Summer (DST): UTC+4:30 (IRDT)

Uzan Malek (Persian: اوزان ملک, also Romanized as Ūzān Malek; also known as Ūzān Eskandarī, Owzān-e Shāhzādeh Khānom, and Ūzān Malek ot Tojjār) is a village in Baranduzchay-ye Jonubi Rural District, in the Central District of Urmia County, West Azerbaijan Province, Iran. At the 2006 census, its population was 475, in 123 families.
