= Dadeh Saqi =

Dadeh Saqi دده‌سقی
- Village
- Location within Iran
- Coordinates: 37°35′00″N 45°06′22″E
- Country: Iran
- Province: West Azerbaijan
- County: Urmia
- Bakhsh: Central
- Rural District: Bash Qaleh

Population (2006)
  - Total: 346
- Time zone: UTC+3:30 (IRST)
  - Summer (DST): UTC+4:30 (IRDT)

Dadeh Saqi (Persian: دده‌سقی, also Romanized as Dadeh Sāqī; also known as Deh-e Sāqī) is a village in Bash Qaleh Rural District, in the Central District of Urmia County, West Azerbaijan Province, Iran. At the 2006 census, its population was 346, in 88 families.
