= Dash Aghol =

Dash Aghol داش اغل
- Village
- Location within Iran
- Coordinates: 37°16′13″N 45°18′10″E
- Country: Iran
- Province: West Azerbaijan
- County: Urmia
- Bakhsh: Central
- Rural District: Dul

Population (2006)
  - Total: 104
- Time zone: UTC+3:30 (IRST)
  - Summer (DST): UTC+4:30 (IRDT)

Dash Aghol (Persian: داش اغل, also Romanized as Dāsh Āghol and Dāsh Āghel; also known as Dāsh Āghūl) is a village in Dul Rural District, in the Central District of Urmia County, West Azerbaijan Province, Iran. At the 2006 census, its population was 104, in 39 families.
