= Meshik =

Meshik مشيك
- Village
- Location within Iran
- Coordinates: 37°49′11″N 44°51′49″E
- Country: Iran
- Province: West Azerbaijan
- County: Urmia
- Bakhsh: Anzal
- Rural District: Anzal-e Jonubi

Population (2006)
  - Total: 165
- Time zone: UTC+3:30 (IRST)
  - Summer (DST): UTC+4:30 (IRDT)

Meshik (Persian: مشيك, also Romanized as Meshīk; also known as Mīshīk) is a village in Anzal-e Jonubi Rural District, Anzal District, Urmia County, West Azerbaijan Province, Iran. At the 2006 census, its population was 165, in 33 families.
