= Kuseh Ahmad =

Kuseh Ahmad كوسه احمد
- Village
- Location within Iran
- Coordinates: 37°44′59″N 44°57′25″E
- Country: Iran
- Province: West Azerbaijan
- County: Urmia
- Bakhsh: Nazlu
- Rural District: Nazluchay

Population (2006)
  - Total: 595
- Time zone: UTC+3:30 (IRST)
  - Summer (DST): UTC+4:30 (IRDT)

Kuseh Ahmad (Persian: كوسه احمد, also Romanized as Kūseh Aḩmad) is a village in Nazluchay Rural District, Nazlu District, Urmia County, West Azerbaijan Province, Iran. At the 2006 census, its population was 595, in 100 families.
