= Angaman =

Angaman انگمان
- Village
- Location within Iran
- Coordinates: 37°23′54″N 45°02′35″E
- Country: Iran
- Province: West Azerbaijan
- County: Urmia
- Bakhsh: Central
- Rural District: Baranduz

Population (2006)
  - Total: 167
- Time zone: UTC+3:30 (IRST)
  - Summer (DST): UTC+4:30 (IRDT)

Angaman (Persian: انگمان, also Romanized as Angamān) is a village in Baranduz Rural District, in the Central District of Urmia County, West Azerbaijan Province, Iran. At the 2006 census, its population was 167, in 28 families.
