= Ayeblu =

Ayeblu ايبلو
- Village
- Location within Iran
- Coordinates: 37°41′01″N 45°11′50″E
- Country: Iran
- Province: West Azerbaijan
- County: Urmia
- Bakhsh: Central
- Rural District: Bash Qaleh

Population (2006)
  - Total: 141
- Time zone: UTC+3:30 (IRST)
  - Summer (DST): UTC+4:30 (IRDT)

Ayeblu (Persian: ايبلو, also Romanized as Āyeblū and ‘Ayeblū) is a village in Bash Qaleh Rural District, in the Central District of Urmia County, West Azerbaijan Province, Iran. At the 2006 census, its population was 141, in 40 families.
