= Barbaran =

Barbaran بربران
- Village
- Location within Iran
- Coordinates: 37°19′49″N 45°08′49″E
- Country: Iran
- Province: West Azerbaijan
- County: Urmia
- Bakhsh: Central
- Rural District: Baranduzchay-ye Jonubi

Population (2006)
  - Total: 143
- Time zone: UTC+3:30 (IRST)
  - Summer (DST): UTC+4:30 (IRDT)

Barbaran (Persian: بربران, also Romanized as Barbarān) is a village in Baranduzchay-ye Jonubi Rural District in the Central District of Urmia County, West Azerbaijan Province, Iran. At the 2006 census, its population was 143 in 30 families.
