= Mirshekarlu =

Mirshekarlu ميرشكارلو
- Village
- Location within Iran
- Coordinates: 37°25′23″N 45°12′37″E
- Country: Iran
- Province: West Azerbaijan
- County: Urmia
- Bakhsh: Central
- Rural District: Torkaman

Population (2006)
  - Total: 376
- Time zone: UTC+3:30 (IRST)
  - Summer (DST): UTC+4:30 (IRDT)

Mirshekarlu (Persian: ميرشكارلو, also Romanized as Mīrshekārlū) is a village in Torkaman Rural District, in the Central District of Urmia County, West Azerbaijan Province, Iran. At the 2006 census, its population was 376, in 97 families.
