= Surkan =

Surkan سوركان
- Village
- Location within Iran
- Coordinates: 37°14′20″N 45°00′17″E
- Country: Iran
- Province: West Azerbaijan
- County: Urmia
- Bakhsh: Silvaneh
- Rural District: Margavar

Population (2006)
  - Total: 658
- Time zone: UTC+3:30 (IRST)
  - Summer (DST): UTC+4:30 (IRDT)

Surkan (Persian: سوركان, also Romanized as Sūrkān) is a village in Margavar Rural District, Silvaneh District, Urmia County, West Azerbaijan Province, Iran. At the 2006 census, its population was 658, in 85 families.
