= Dowla Pasan =

Dowla Pasan دولاپسان
- Village
- Location within Iran
- Coordinates: 37°26′21″N 44°54′40″E
- Country: Iran
- Province: West Azerbaijan
- County: Urmia
- Bakhsh: Silvaneh
- Rural District: Dasht

Population (2006)
  - Total: 158
- Time zone: UTC+3:30 (IRST)
  - Summer (DST): UTC+4:30 (IRDT)

Dowla Pasan (Persian: دولاپسان, also Romanized as Dowlā Pasān; also known as Dolāpesān, Doleh Pasān, and Dowleh Pasān) is a village in Dasht Rural District, Silvaneh District, Urmia County, West Azerbaijan Province, Iran. At the 2006 census, its population was 158, in 30 families.
