= Vandai =

Vandai وندایی
- Village
- Location within Iran
- Coordinates: 37°29′03″N 45°09′47″E
- Country: Iran
- Province: West Azerbaijan
- County: Urmia
- Bakhsh: Central
- Rural District: Torkaman Rural District

Population (2006)
  - Total: 220
- Time zone: UTC+3:30 (IRST)
  - Summer (DST): UTC+4:30 (IRDT)

Vandai (Persian: وندایی, also Romanized as Vandā'ī) is a village in Torkaman Rural District, in the Central District of Urmia County, West Azerbaijan Province, Iran. At the 2006 census, its population was 220, in 50 families.
