= Danqaralu =

Danqaralu دانقرالو
- Village
- Location within Iran
- Coordinates: 37°42′38″N 45°07′18″E
- Country: Iran
- Province: West Azerbaijan
- County: Urmia
- Bakhsh: Central
- Rural District: Bash Qaleh

Population (2006)
  - Total: 208
- Time zone: UTC+3:30 (IRST)
  - Summer (DST): UTC+4:30 (IRDT)

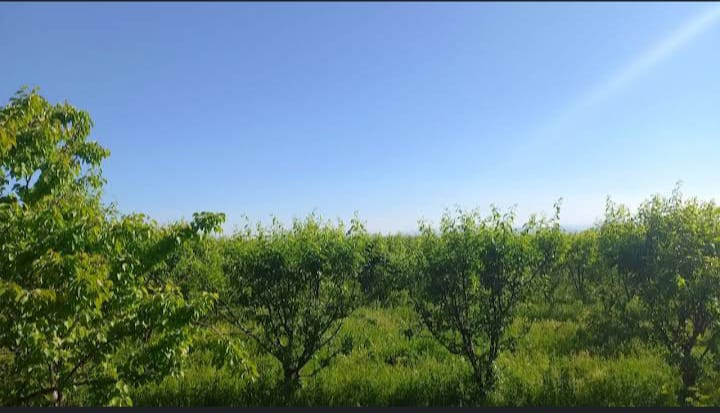
danqaralu

Danqaralu (Persian: دانقرالو, also Romanized as Dānqarālū and Dānqarlū) is a village in Bash Qaleh Rural District, in the Central District of Urmia County, West Azerbaijan Province, Iran. At the 2006 census, its population was 208, in 62 families.

The name of this ancient village is believed to have originated from the Sumerian word "Tangri" or "Dingir", meaning "God" (in the Turkish language, "Tanrı" or "Tarı"), combined with the suffix "li", which denotes belonging or association, as in "Tabrizli" and "Tehranli".

The original location of the village was on the banks of the Nazlu River. In 1968, due to the river's flooding, the village was relocated to its present location. Only the ruins of the village's old mosque remain at the original site.
