= Salim Kandi =

Salim Kandi سلیم‌کندی
- Village
- Location within Iran
- Coordinates: 37°40′26″N 45°06′42″E
- Country: Iran
- Province: West Azerbaijan
- County: Urmia
- Bakhsh: Central
- Rural District: Nazluy-ye Jonubi

Population (2006)
  - Total: 53
- Time zone: UTC+3:30 (IRST)
  - Summer (DST): UTC+4:30 (IRDT)

Salim Kandi (Persian: سلیم‌کندی, also Romanized as Salīm Kandī; also known as Tappeh Lar) is a village in Nazluy-ye Jonubi Rural District, in the Central District of Urmia County, West Azerbaijan Province, Iran. At the 2006 census, its population was 53, in 16 families.
