= Kurteh Kavil =

Kurteh Kavil كورته كويل
- Village
- Location within Iran
- Coordinates: 37°37′02″N 44°43′11″E
- Country: Iran
- Province: West Azerbaijan
- County: Urmia
- Bakhsh: Silvaneh
- Rural District: Targavar

Population (2006)
  - Total: 57
- Time zone: UTC+3:30 (IRST)
  - Summer (DST): UTC+4:30 (IRDT)

Kurteh Kavil (Persian: كورته كويل, also romanized as Kūrteh Kavīl; also known as Kūr Takvīl) is a village in Targavar Rural District, Silvaneh District, Urmia County, West Azerbaijan Province, Iran. At the 2006 census, its population was 57, in 12 families.
