= Hasu Kandi =

Hasu Kandi حسوكندي
- Village
- Location within Iran
- Coordinates: 37°23′15″N 45°03′04″E
- Country: Iran
- Province: West Azerbaijan
- County: Urmia
- Bakhsh: Central
- Rural District: Baranduz

Population (2006)
  - Total: 206
- Time zone: UTC+3:30 (IRST)
  - Summer (DST): UTC+4:30 (IRDT)

Hasu Kandi (Persian: حسوكندي, also Romanized as Ḩasū Kandī) is a village in Baranduz Rural District, in the Central District of Urmia County, West Azerbaijan Province, Iran. At the 2006 census, its population was 206, in 43 families.
