= Bastakabad =

Bastakabad بستك اباد
- Village
- Location within Iran
- Coordinates: 38°01′02″N 44°41′19″E
- Country: Iran
- Province: West Azerbaijan
- County: Urmia
- Bakhsh: Sumay-ye Beradust
- Rural District: Sumay-ye Shomali

Population (2006)
  - Total: 420
- Time zone: UTC+3:30 (IRST)
  - Summer (DST): UTC+4:30 (IRDT)

Bastakabad (Persian: بستك اباد, also romanized as Bastakābād) is a village in Sumay-ye Shomali Rural District, Sumay-ye Beradust District, Urmia County, West Azerbaijan Province, Iran. At the 2006 census, its population was 420, in 67 families.
