= Avdi =

Avdi اودي
- Village
- Location within Iran
- Coordinates: 37°32′29″N 44°44′14″E
- Country: Iran
- Province: West Azerbaijan
- County: Urmia
- Bakhsh: Silvaneh
- Rural District: Targavar

Population (2006)
  - Total: 121
- Time zone: UTC+3:30 (IRST)
  - Summer (DST): UTC+4:30 (IRDT)

Avdi (Persian: اودي, also Romanized as Āvdī) is a village in Targavar Rural District, Silvaneh District, Urmia County, West Azerbaijan Province, Iran. At the 2006 census, its population was 121, in 20 families.
