= Sufi Kani =

Sufi Kani صوفي كاني
- Village
- Location within Iran
- Coordinates: 37°44′47″N 44°46′50″E
- Country: Iran
- Province: West Azerbaijan
- County: Urmia
- Bakhsh: Sumay-ye Beradust
- Rural District: Beradust

Population (2006)
  - Total: 132
- Time zone: UTC+3:30 (IRST)
  - Summer (DST): UTC+4:30 (IRDT)

Sufi Kani (Persian: صوفي كاني, also Romanized as Şūfī Kānī; also known as Şūfī Kānūn and Sūfī Kānūn) is a village in Beradust Rural District, Sumay-ye Beradust District, Urmia County, West Azerbaijan Province, Iran. At the 2006 census, its population was 132, in 22 families.
