= Ashnaabad, West Azerbaijan =

Ashnaabad
- village
- Location within Iran
- Coordinates: 37°37′08″N 44°57′47″E
- Country: Iran
- Province: West Azerbaijan
- County: Urmia
- Bakhsh: Central
- Rural District: Rowzeh Chay

Population (2006)
  - Total: 335
- Time zone: UTC+3:30 (IRST)
  - Summer (DST): UTC+4:30 (IRDT)

Ashnaabad (Persian: اشنااباد also Romanized as Āshnāābād) is a village in Rowzeh Chay Rural District, in the Central District of Urmia County, West Azerbaijan Province, Iran. At the 2006 census, its population was 335, in 100 families.
