= Akhtetar =

Akhtetar اختتر
- kampung
- Location within Iran
- Coordinates: 36°33′13″N 46°07′18″E
- Negara: Iran
- Wilayah: Azerbaijan Barat
- Daerah: Bukan
- Bakhsh: Pusat
- Daerah Luar Bandar: Akhtachi

Population (2006)
  - Total: 339
- Time zone: UTC+3:30 (IRST)
  - Summer (DST): UTC+4:30 (IRDT)

Akhtetar (Persian: اختتر) ialah sebuah kampung di Daerah Luar Bandar Akhtachi, dalam Daerah Pusat di Daerah Bukan, Wilayah Azerbaijan Barat, Iran. Pada bancian 2006, jumlah penduduknya adalah 339 orang, terdiri daripada 54 keluarga.
