= Suleh Dugal =

Suleh Dugal سوله دوگل
- Village
- Location within Iran
- Coordinates: 37°10′42″N 44°52′30″E
- Country: Iran
- Province: West Azerbaijan
- County: Urmia
- Bakhsh: Silvaneh
- Rural District: Margavar

Population (2006)
  - Total: 142
- Time zone: UTC+3:30 (IRST)
  - Summer (DST): UTC+4:30 (IRDT)

Suleh Dugal (Persian: سوله دوگل, also Romanized as Sūleh Dūgal; also known as Sūleh Dogal and Sūreh Dūkal) is a village in Margavar Rural District, Silvaneh District, Urmia County, West Azerbaijan Province, Iran. At the 2006 census, its population was 142, in 27 families.
