= Irvanlu =

Irvanlu ايروانلو
- Village
- Location within Iran
- Coordinates: 37°41′19″N 45°04′27″E
- Country: Iran
- Province: West Azerbaijan
- County: Urmia
- Bakhsh: Central
- Rural District: Nazluy-ye Jonubi

Population (2006)
  - Total: 232
- Time zone: UTC+3:30 (IRST)
  - Summer (DST): UTC+4:30 (IRDT)

Irvanlu (Persian: ايروانلو, also Romanized as Īrvānlū) is a village in Nazluy-ye Jonubi Rural District, in the Central District of Urmia County, West Azerbaijan Province, Iran. At the 2006 census, its population was 232, in 62 families.
