= Kakalar =

Kakalar كاكالر
- Village
- Location within Iran
- Coordinates: 37°39′54″N 45°05′50″E
- Country: Iran
- Province: West Azerbaijan
- County: Urmia
- Bakhsh: Central
- Rural District: Nazluy-ye Jonubi

Population (2006)
  - Total: 82
- Time zone: UTC+3:30 (IRST)
  - Summer (DST): UTC+4:30 (IRDT)

Kakalar (Persian: كاكالر, also Romanized as Kākālar; also known as Kāklar) is a village in Nazluy-ye Jonubi Rural District, in the Central District of Urmia County, West Azerbaijan Province, Iran. At the 2006 census, its population was 82, in 24 families.
