= Kelasi =

Kelasi كلاسي
- Village
- Location within Iran
- Coordinates: 37°18′04″N 44°51′56″E
- Country: Iran
- Province: West Azerbaijan
- County: Urmia
- Bakhsh: Silvaneh
- Rural District: Margavar

Population (2006)
  - Total: 528
- Time zone: UTC+3:30 (IRST)
  - Summer (DST): UTC+4:30 (IRDT)

Kelasi (Persian: كلاسي, also Romanized as Kelāsī) is a village in Margavar Rural District, Silvaneh District, Urmia County, West Azerbaijan Province, Iran. At the 2006 census, its population was 528, in 95 families.
