= Marajul =

Marajul مراجول
- Village
- Location within Iran
- Coordinates: 37°34′04″N 45°08′23″E
- Country: Iran
- Province: West Azerbaijan
- County: Urmia
- Bakhsh: Central
- Rural District: Bakeshluchay

Population (2006)
  - Total: 369
- Time zone: UTC+3:30 (IRST)
  - Summer (DST): UTC+4:30 (IRDT)

Marajul (Persian: مراجول, also Romanized as Marājūl; also known as Marjal) is a village in Bakeshluchay Rural District, in the Central District of Urmia County, West Azerbaijan Province, Iran. At the 2006 census, its population was 369, in 106 families.
