= Narlar =

Narlar نرلر
- Village
- Location within Iran
- Coordinates: 37°21′49″N 45°01′05″E
- Country: Iran
- Province: West Azerbaijan
- County: Urmia
- Bakhsh: Central
- Rural District: Baranduz

Population (2006)
  - Total: 212
- Time zone: UTC+3:30 (IRST)
  - Summer (DST): UTC+4:30 (IRDT)

Narlar (Persian: نرلر; also known as Nareh Lūr and Narleh) is a village in Baranduz Rural District, in the Central District of Urmia County, West Azerbaijan Province, Iran. At the 2006 census, its population was 212, in 32 families.
