= Tappeh-ye Babaganjeh =

Tappeh-ye Babaganjeh تپه باباگنجه
- Village
- Location within Iran
- Coordinates: 37°44′00″N 45°08′00″E
- Country: Iran
- Province: West Azerbaijan
- County: Urmia
- Bakhsh: Nazlu
- Rural District: Nazlu-e Shomali

Population (2006)
  - Total: 72
- Time zone: UTC+3:30 (IRST)
  - Summer (DST): UTC+4:30 (IRDT)

Tappeh-ye Babaganjeh (Persian: تپه باباگنجه, also Romanized as Tappeh-ye Bābāganjeh) is a village in Nazlu-e Shomali Rural District, Nazlu District, Urmia County, West Azerbaijan Province, Iran. At the 2006 census, its population was 72, in 17 families.
