= Hajji Pirlu =

Hajji Pirlu حاجي پيرلو
- Village
- Location within Iran
- Coordinates: 37°32′05″N 45°12′26″E
- Country: Iran
- Province: West Azerbaijan
- County: Urmia
- Bakhsh: Central
- Rural District: Bakeshluchay

Population (2006)
  - Total: 127
- Time zone: UTC+3:30 (IRST)
  - Summer (DST): UTC+4:30 (IRDT)

Hajji Pirlu (Persian: حاجي پيرلو, also Romanized as Ḩājjī Pīrlū; also known as Ḩājjī Panīrlū) is a village in Bakeshluchay Rural District, in the Central District of Urmia County, West Azerbaijan Province, Iran. At the 2006 census, its population was 127, in 38 families.
