= Qoturlar =

Qoturlar قطورلار
- Village
- Location within Iran
- Coordinates: 37°31′50″N 45°11′28″E
- Country: Iran
- Province: West Azerbaijan
- County: Urmia
- Bakhsh: Central
- Rural District: Bakeshluchay

Population (2006)
  - Total: 317
- Time zone: UTC+3:30 (IRST)
  - Summer (DST): UTC+4:30 (IRDT)

Qoturlar (Persian: قطورلار, also Romanized as Qoţūrlār) is a village in Bakeshluchay Rural District, in the Central District of Urmia County, West Azerbaijan Province, Iran. At the 2006 census, its population was 317, in 97 families.
