= Eslampanahabadi Jadid =

Eslampanahabadi Jadid اسلام‌پناه آبادی جدید
- Village
- Country: Iran
- Province: West Azerbaijan
- County: Urmia
- Bakhsh: Central
- Rural District: Bash Qaleh

Population (2006)
  - Total: 169
- Time zone: UTC+3:30 (IRST)
  - Summer (DST): UTC+4:30 (IRDT)

Eslampanahabadi Jadid (Persian: اسلام‌پناه آبادی جدید, also Romanized as Eslāmpanāhābādī Jadīd) is a village in Bash Qaleh Rural District, in the Central District of Urmia County, West Azerbaijan Province, Iran. At the 2006 census, its population was 169, in 35 families.
