= Qaraneh =

Garaneh گارانه
- Village
- Location within Iran
- Coordinates: 37°19′29″N 44°53′11″E
- Country: Iran
- Province: West Azerbaijan
- County: Urmia
- Bakhsh: Silvaneh
- Rural District: Margavar

Population (2006)
  - Total: 421
- Time zone: UTC+3:30 (IRST)
  - Summer (DST): UTC+4:30 (IRDT)

Garaneh (Persian: گارانه, also Romanized as Qārāneh; also known as Gārāneh) is a village in Margavar Rural District, Silvaneh District, Urmia County, West Azerbaijan Province, Iran. At the 2006 census, its population was 421, in 79 families. Name Garana is a Kurdish name. "Ga" means Cow, "Garan" means cattle, herd. The village is named "Garana" after its construction in a place which was dedicated to cattle of nearby villages. Demographics: Total population of the village speak northern Kurdish dialect (Kurmanji) and they follow Shafe'i school of sunni Islam.
