= Bardehzi-ye Olya =

Bardehzi-ye Olya برده زي عليا
- Village
- Location within Iran
- Coordinates: 37°47′00″N 44°36′26″E
- Country: Iran
- Province: West Azerbaijan
- County: Urmia
- Bakhsh: Sumay-ye Beradust
- Rural District: Beradust

Population (2006)
  - Total: 352
- Time zone: UTC+3:30 (IRST)
  - Summer (DST): UTC+4:30 (IRDT)

Bardehzi-ye Olya (Persian: برده زي عليا, also Romanized as Bardehzī-ye ‘Olyā; also known as Bardazī, Bardehzī, and Bardīzī) is a village in Beradust Rural District, Sumay-ye Beradust District, Urmia County, West Azerbaijan Province, Iran. At the 2006 census, its population was 352, in 59 families.
