= Ilazgi =

Ilazgi ایلزگی
- Village
- Location within Iran
- Coordinates: 37°22′30″N 45°14′12″E
- Country: Iran
- Province: West Azerbaijan
- County: Urmia
- Bakhsh: Central
- Rural District: Baranduzchay-ye Jonubi

Population (2006)
  - Total: 15
- Time zone: UTC+3:30 (IRST)
  - Summer (DST): UTC+4:30 (IRDT)

Ilazgi (Persian: ایلزگی, also Romanized as Īlazgī) is a village in Baranduzchay-ye Jonubi Rural District, in the Central District of Urmia County, West Azerbaijan Province, Iran. At the 2006 census, its population was 15, in 5 families.
