= Bi Bakran =

Bi Bakran بي بكران
- Village
- Location within Iran
- Coordinates: 37°18′06″N 44°55′57″E
- Country: Iran
- Province: West Azerbaijan
- County: Urmia
- Bakhsh: Silvaneh
- Rural District: Margavar

Population (2006)
  - Total: 214
- Time zone: UTC+3:30 (IRST)
  - Summer (DST): UTC+4:30 (IRDT)

Bi Bakran (Persian: بي بكران, also Romanized as Bī Bakrān and Bībakrān; also known as Bibikeran, Būbakrān, and Būnkarān) is a village in Margavar Rural District, Silvaneh District, Urmia County, West Azerbaijan Province, Iran. At the 2006 census, its population was 214, in 35 families.
