= Seylaneh =

Seylaneh سيلانه
- Village
- Location within Iran
- Coordinates: 37°17′35″N 45°08′20″E
- Country: Iran
- Province: West Azerbaijan
- County: Urmia
- Bakhsh: Central
- Rural District: Baranduzchay-ye Jonubi

Population (2006)
  - Total: 75
- Time zone: UTC+3:30 (IRST)
  - Summer (DST): UTC+4:30 (IRDT)

Seylaneh (Persian: سيلانه, also Romanized as Seylāneh; also known as Seylān) is a village in Baranduzchay-ye Jonubi Rural District, in the Central District of Urmia County, West Azerbaijan Province, Iran. At the 2006 census, its population was 75, in 20 families.
