= Quyujoq =

Quyujoq قويوجق
- Village
- Location within Iran
- Coordinates: 37°54′22″N 44°52′59″E
- Country: Iran
- Province: West Azerbaijan
- County: Urmia
- Bakhsh: Anzal
- Rural District: Anzal-e Jonubi

Population (2006)
  - Total: 93
- Time zone: UTC+3:30 (IRST)
  - Summer (DST): UTC+4:30 (IRDT)

Quyujoq (Persian: قويوجق, also Romanized as Qūyūjoq; also known as Kūjīkh and Qūjūq) is a village in Anzal-e Jonubi Rural District, Anzal District, Urmia County, West Azerbaijan Province, Iran. At the 2006 census, its population was 93, in 14 families.
