= Kani Quzan =

Kani Quzan کانی‌قوزان
- Village
- Location within Iran
- Coordinates: 37°34′17″N 44°55′51″E
- Country: Iran
- Province: West Azerbaijan
- County: Urmia
- Bakhsh: Central
- Rural District: Rowzeh Chay

Population (2006)
  - Total: 304
- Time zone: UTC+3:30 (IRST)
  - Summer (DST): UTC+4:30 (IRDT)

Kani Quzan (Persian: کانی‌قوزان, also Romanized as Kānī Qūzān; also known as Kānī Gūzān) is a village in Rowzeh Chay Rural District, in the Central District of Urmia County, West Azerbaijan Province, Iran. At the 2006 census, its population was 304, in 57 families.
