= Qeshlaq-e Tarazlu =

Qeshlaq-e Tarzilu قشلاق طرزیلو
- Village
- Location within Iran
- Coordinates: 37°31′51″N 44°57′33″E
- Country: Iran
- Province: West Azerbaijan
- County: Urmia
- Bakhsh: Central
- Rural District: Rowzeh Chay

Population (2006)
  - Total: 353
- Time zone: UTC+3:30 (IRST)
  - Summer (DST): UTC+4:30 (IRDT)

Qeshlaq-e Tarzilu (Persian: قشلاق طرزیلو, kurdish:قه‌شلاقی طرزیلو Romanized as Qeşlaqê Tarzêlo; also known as Qeshlâqê Pachik is a village in Rowzeh Chay Rural District, in the Central District of Urmia County, West Azerbaijan Province, Iran. At the 2006 census, its population was 353, in 77 families.
