= Zaiyeh Kandi =

Zaiyeh Kandi زایه‌کندی
- Village
- Country: Iran
- Province: West Azerbaijan
- County: Urmia
- Bakhsh: Central
- Rural District: Nazluy-ye Jonubi

Population (2006)
  - Total: 131
- Time zone: UTC+3:30 (IRST)
  - Summer (DST): UTC+4:30 (IRDT)

Zaiyeh Kandi (Persian: زایه‌کندی, also Romanized as Zāīyeh Kandī) is a village in Nazluy-ye Jonubi Rural District, in the Central District of Urmia County, West Azerbaijan Province, Iran. At the 2006 census, its population was 131, in 37 families.
