= Mahmudan =

Mahmudan محمودان
- Village
- Location within Iran
- Coordinates: 37°54′56″N 44°49′54″E
- Country: Iran
- Province: West Azerbaijan
- County: Urmia
- Bakhsh: Anzal
- Rural District: Anzal-e Jonubi

Population (2006)
  - Total: 33
- Time zone: UTC+3:30 (IRST)
  - Summer (DST): UTC+4:30 (IRDT)

Mahmudan (Persian: محمودان, also Romanized as Maḩmūdān) is a village in Anzal-e Jonubi Rural District, Anzal District, Urmia County, West Azerbaijan Province, Iran. At the 2006 census, its population was 33, in 4 families.
