= Shahrak-e Rustayi-ye Naser =

Shahrak-e Rustayi-ye Naser شهرک روستایی نصر
- Village
- Country: Iran
- Province: West Azerbaijan
- County: Urmia
- Bakhsh: Central
- Rural District: Dul

Population (2006)
  - Total: 286
- Time zone: UTC+3:30 (IRST)
  - Summer (DST): UTC+4:30 (IRDT)

Shahrak-e Rustayi-ye Naser (Persian: شهرک روستایی نصر, also Romanized as Shahrak-e Rūstāyī-ye Naşer) is a village in Dul Rural District, in the Central District of Urmia County, West Azerbaijan Province, Iran. At the 2006 census, its population was 286, in 92 families.
