= Bardeh Kish =

Bardeh Kish برده كيش
- Village
- Location within Iran
- Coordinates: 37°12′23″N 45°12′37″E
- Country: Iran
- Province: West Azerbaijan
- County: Urmia
- Bakhsh: Central
- Rural District: Dul

Population (2006)
  - Total: 159
- Time zone: UTC+3:30 (IRST)
  - Summer (DST): UTC+4:30 (IRDT)

Bardeh Kish (Persian: برده كيش, also Romanized as Bardeh Kīsh; also known as Bardeh Kesh and Bardkīsh) is a village in Dul Rural District, in the Central District of Urmia County, West Azerbaijan Province, Iran. At the 2006 census, its population was 159, in 35 families.
