= Kutalan =

Kutalan كوتالان
- Village
- Location within Iran
- Coordinates: 37°37′01″N 44°55′45″E
- Country: Iran
- Province: West Azerbaijan
- County: Urmia
- Bakhsh: Central
- Rural District: Rowzeh Chay

Population (2006)
  - Total: 242
- Time zone: UTC+3:30 (IRST)
  - Summer (DST): UTC+4:30 (IRDT)

Kutalan (Persian: كوتالان, also Romanized as Kūtālān; also known as Kātālān) is a village in Rowzeh Chay Rural District, in the Central District of Urmia County, West Azerbaijan Province, Iran. At the 2006 census, its population was 242, in 53 families.
