= Best, West Azerbaijan =

Best بست
- Village
- Country: Iran
- Province: West Azerbaijan
- County: Urmia
- Bakhsh: Silvaneh
- Rural District: Margavar

Population (2006)
  - Total: 44
- Time zone: UTC+3:30 (IRST)
  - Summer (DST): UTC+4:30 (IRDT)

Best (Persian: بست) is a village in Margavar Rural District, Silvaneh District, Urmia County, West Azerbaijan Province, Iran. At the 2006 census, its population was 44, in 8 families.
