= Yowrqanlu =

Yowrqanlu يورقانلو
- Village
- Location within Iran
- Coordinates: 37°38′04″N 44°59′37″E
- Country: Iran
- Province: West Azerbaijan
- County: Urmia
- Bakhsh: Central
- Rural District: Rowzeh Chay

Population (2006)
  - Total: 291
- Time zone: UTC+3:30 (IRST)
  - Summer (DST): UTC+4:30 (IRDT)

Yowrqanlu (Persian: يورقانلو, also Romanized as Yowrqānlū; also known as Yowrghānlū) is a village in Rowzeh Chay Rural District, in the Central District of Urmia County, West Azerbaijan Province, Iran. At the 2006 census, its population was 291, in 75 families.
