= Owch Ovlar =

Owch Ovlar اوچ اولر
- Village
- Location within Iran
- Coordinates: 37°28′56″N 45°11′46″E
- Country: Iran
- Province: West Azerbaijan
- County: Urmia
- Bakhsh: Central
- Rural District: Torkaman

Population (2006)
  - Total: 184
- Time zone: UTC+3:30 (IRST)
  - Summer (DST): UTC+4:30 (IRDT)

Owch Ovlar (Persian: اوچ اولر, also Romanized as Ūch Ovlar) is a village in Torkaman Rural District, in the Central District of Urmia County, West Azerbaijan Province, Iran. At the 2006 census, its population was 184, in 42 families.
