= Owzarlu =

Owzarlu اوزرلو
- Village
- Location within Iran
- Coordinates: 37°42′00″N 45°03′21″E
- Country: Iran
- Province: West Azerbaijan
- County: Urmia
- Bakhsh: Central
- Rural District: Nazluy-ye Jonubi

Population (2006)
  - Total: 217
- Time zone: UTC+3:30 (IRST)
  - Summer (DST): UTC+4:30 (IRDT)

Owzarlu (Persian: اوزرلو, also Romanized as Owzarlū; also known as Ozārlū and Ozqalū) is a village in Nazluy-ye Jonubi Rural District, in the Central District of Urmia County, West Azerbaijan Province, Iran. At the 2006 census, its population was 217, in 62 families.
