= Tapik =

Tapik تپيك
- Village
- Location within Iran
- Coordinates: 37°40′58″N 44°53′50″E
- Country: Iran
- Province: West Azerbaijan
- County: Urmia
- Bakhsh: Nazlu
- Rural District: Nazluchay

Population (2006)
  - Total: 97
- Time zone: UTC+3:30 (IRST)
  - Summer (DST): UTC+4:30 (IRDT)

Tapik (Persian: تپيك, also Romanized as Tapīk; also known as Tapak) is a village in Nazluchay Rural District, Nazlu District, Urmia County, West Azerbaijan Province, Iran. As of the 2006 census, its population was 97, in the form of 20 families.
