= Barbin =

Barbin باربين
- Village
- Location within Iran
- Coordinates: 37°39′49″N 45°02′09″E
- Country: Iran
- Province: West Azerbaijan
- County: Urmia
- Bakhsh: Central
- Rural District: Nazluy-ye Jonubi

Population (2006)
  - Total: 42
- Time zone: UTC+3:30 (IRST)
  - Summer (DST): UTC+4:30 (IRDT)

Barbin (Persian: باربين, also Romanized as Bārbīn) is a village in Nazluy-ye Jonubi Rural District, in the Central District of Urmia County, West Azerbaijan Province, Iran. At the 2006 census, its population was 42, in 15 families.
