= Guyjeh Ali Aslan =

Village in West Azerbaijan, Iran

Guyjeh Ali Aslan گویجه علی اصلان
- Village
- Location within Iran
- Coordinates: 37°39′30″N 45°09′12″E
- Country: Iran
- Province: West Azerbaijan
- County: Urmia
- Bakhsh: Central
- Rural District: Bash Qaleh

Population (2006)
  - Total: 127
- Time zone: UTC+3:30 (IRST)
  - Summer (DST): UTC+4:30 (IRDT)

Guyjeh Ali Aslan (Persian: گویجه علی اصلان, also Romanized as Gūyjeh ʿAlī Aşlān; also known as Gūyjehlū-ye Aşlān) is a village in Bash Qaleh Rural District, in the Central District of Urmia County, West Azerbaijan Province, Iran. At the 2006 census, its population was 127, in 38 families.
