= Safarqoli Khan Kandi =

Safarqoli Khan Kandi صفرقلی‌خان‌کندی
- Village
- Location within Iran
- Coordinates: 37°40′09″N 45°07′39″E
- Country: Iran
- Province: West Azerbaijan
- County: Urmia
- Bakhsh: Central
- Rural District: Bash Qaleh

Population (2006)
  - Total: 119
- Time zone: UTC+3:30 (IRST)
  - Summer (DST): UTC+4:30 (IRDT)

Safarqoli Khan Kandi (Persian: صفرقلی‌خان‌کندی, also Romanized as Şafarqolī Khān Kandī; also known as Şafar ‘Alīkhān Kandī and Şafarqolī Kandī) is a village in Bash Qaleh Rural District, in the Central District of Urmia County, West Azerbaijan Province, Iran. At the 2006 census, its population was 119, in 36 families.
