= Molla Basak =

Molla Basak ملاباسك
- Village
- Location within Iran
- Coordinates: 37°14′26″N 44°54′00″E
- Country: Iran
- Province: West Azerbaijan
- County: Urmia
- Bakhsh: Silvaneh
- Rural District: Margavar

Population (2006)
  - Total: 492
- Time zone: UTC+3:30 (IRST)
  - Summer (DST): UTC+4:30 (IRDT)

Molla Basak (Persian: ملاباسك, also romanized as Mollā Bāsak; also known as Mollā Bāstak) is a village in Margavar Rural District, Silvaneh District, Urmia County, West Azerbaijan Province, Iran. At the 2006 census its population was 492, in 82 families.
