= Pirhadi =

Pirhadi پيرهادي
- Village
- Location within Iran
- Coordinates: 37°28′06″N 44°56′58″E
- Country: Iran
- Province: West Azerbaijan
- County: Urmia
- Bakhsh: Silvaneh
- Rural District: Dasht

Population (2006)
  - Total: 160
- Time zone: UTC+3:30 (IRST)
  - Summer (DST): UTC+4:30 (IRDT)

Pirhadi (Persian: پيرهادي, also Romanized as Pīrhādī) is a village in Dasht Rural District, Silvaneh District, Urmia County, West Azerbaijan Province, Iran. At the 2006 census, its population was 160, in 28 families.
