= Lerni =

Lerni لرنی in Kurdish Renîka
- Village
- Location within Iran
- Coordinates: 37°36′05″N 44°54′05″E
- Country: Iran
- Province: West Azerbaijan
- County: Urmia
- Bakhsh: Central
- Rural District: Rowzeh Chay

Population (2006)
  - Total: 373
- Time zone: UTC+3:30 (IRST)
  - Summer (DST): UTC+4:30 (IRDT)

Lernî (Persian: لرنی, also Romanized as Lernī in Kurdish Renîka(Ranika)) is a village in Rowzeh Chay Rural District, in the Central District of Urmia County, West Azerbaijan province, Iran. At the 2016 census, its population was 460, in 120 families.
