= Nur ol Dinabad, West Azerbaijan =

Nur ol Dinabad نورالدين اباد
- Village
- Location within Iran
- Coordinates: 37°50′44″N 44°48′30″E
- Country: Iran
- Province: West Azerbaijan
- County: Urmia
- Bakhsh: Anzal
- Rural District: Anzal-e Jonubi

Population (2006)
  - Total: 140
- Time zone: UTC+3:30 (IRST)
  - Summer (DST): UTC+4:30 (IRDT)

Nur ol Dinabad (Persian: نورالدين اباد, also Romanized as Nūr ol Dīnābād, Nūr ed Dīnābād, and Nūr od Dīnābād) is a village in Anzal-e Jonubi Rural District, Anzal District, Urmia County, West Azerbaijan Province, Iran. At the 2006 census, its population was 140, in 25 families.
