= Pirkani =

Pirkani پيركاني
- Urban
- Location within Pakistan

Population (2018)
  - Total: 35,000
- Time zone: UTC+5:00 (PST)
- Area code: +92 (0) 81

Pirkani (Persian: پيركاني, also Romanized as Pīrkānī) is a Baloch tribe in Quetta, Quetta District, Pakistan. At the 2018 census, its population was 35,000.
