= Owkhchilar =

Owkhchilar اوخچيلار
- Village
- Location within Iran
- Coordinates: 37°45′04″N 45°07′23″E
- Country: Iran
- Province: West Azerbaijan
- County: Urmia
- Bakhsh: Nazlu
- Rural District: Nazlu-e Shomali

Population (2006)
  - Total: 23
- Time zone: UTC+3:30 (IRST)
  - Summer (DST): UTC+4:30 (IRDT)

Owkhchilar (Persian: اوخچيلار, also Romanized as Owkhchīlār; also known as Ūkhchelar) is a village in Nazlu-e Shomali Rural District, Nazlu District, Urmia County, West Azerbaijan Province, Iran. At the 2006 census, its population was 23, in 6 families.
