= Shaban Kandi =

Shaban Kandi شعبان‌کندی
- Village
- Location within Iran
- Coordinates: 37°23′34″N 45°04′45″E
- Country: Iran
- Province: West Azerbaijan
- County: Urmia
- Bakhsh: Central
- Rural District: Baranduzchay-ye Jonubi

Population (2006)
  - Total: 57
- Time zone: UTC+3:30 (IRST)
  - Summer (DST): UTC+4:30 (IRDT)

Shaban Kandi (Persian: شعبان‌کندی, also Romanized as Sha‘bān Kandī) is a village in Baranduzchay-ye Jonubi Rural District, in the Central District of Urmia County, West Azerbaijan Province, Iran. At the 2006 census, its population was 57, in 15 families. The village is populated by Azerbaijanians.
