= Galleh Behi =

Galleh Behi گله بهي
- Village
- Location within Iran
- Coordinates: 37°11′00″N 44°53′00″E
- Country: Iran
- Province: West Azerbaijan
- County: Urmia
- Bakhsh: Silvaneh
- Rural District: Margavar

Population (2006)
  - Total: 276
- Time zone: UTC+3:30 (IRST)
  - Summer (DST): UTC+4:30 (IRDT)

Galleh Behi (Persian: گله بهي, also Romanized as Galleh Behī; also known as Gol-e Behī) is a village in Margavar Rural District, Silvaneh District, Urmia County, West Azerbaijan Province, Iran. At the 2006 census, its population was 276, in 61 families.
