= Sam Salu =

Sam Salu سامسالو
- Village
- Location within Iran
- Coordinates: 37°37′55″N 45°05′29″E
- Country: Iran
- Province: West Azerbaijan
- County: Urmia
- Bakhsh: Central
- Rural District: Nazluy-ye Jonubi

Population (2006)
  - Total: 47
- Time zone: UTC+3:30 (IRST)
  - Summer (DST): UTC+4:30 (IRDT)

Sam Salu (Persian: سامسالو, romanized: Sām Sālū; Syriac: Samsalūi) (Note: Also known as Sāmsālū.) is a village in Nazluy-ye Jonubi Rural District in the Central District of Urmia County, West Azerbaijan Province, Iran. At the 2006 census its population was 47 in 12 families.

== History ==
Samsalūi (today called Sam Salu) was inhabited by 15 Church of the East Christian families and did not have a church or a priest in 1862, according to the Russian archimandrite Sophoniah. It was located in the Anzel district.

== Bibliography ==
- Wilmshurst, David (2000). The Ecclesiastical Organisation of the Church of the East, 1318–1913 (PDF). Peeters Publishers.
