= Hasbestan =

Hasbestan هسبستان
- Village
- Location within Iran
- Coordinates: 37°33′22″N 45°12′40″E
- Country: Iran
- Province: West Azerbaijan
- County: Urmia
- Bakhsh: Central
- Rural District: Bakeshluchay

Population (2006)
  - Total: 59
- Time zone: UTC+3:30 (IRST)
  - Summer (DST): UTC+4:30 (IRDT)

Hasbestan (Persian: هسبستان, also Romanized as Hasbestān; also known as Haspestān and Sabestān) is a village in Bakeshluchay Rural District, in the Central District of Urmia County, West Azerbaijan Province, Iran. At the 2006 census, its population was 59, in 17 families.
