= Peshkeleh =

Peshkeleh پشكله
- Village
- Location within Iran
- Coordinates: 37°26′42″N 44°56′24″E
- Country: Iran
- Province: West Azerbaijan
- County: Urmia
- Bakhsh: Silvaneh
- Rural District: Dasht

Population (2006)
  - Total: 70
- Time zone: UTC+3:30 (IRST)
  - Summer (DST): UTC+4:30 (IRDT)

Peshkeleh (Persian: پشكله; also known as Peshgeleh and Poshtgalleh) is a village in Dasht Rural District, Silvaneh District, Urmia County, West Azerbaijan Province, Iran. At the 2006 census, its population was 70, in 12 families.
