= Gerdah Belij =

Gerdah Belij گرده بليج
- Village
- Location within Iran
- Coordinates: 37°36′39″N 44°51′36″E
- Country: Iran
- Province: West Azerbaijan
- County: Urmia
- Bakhsh: Silvaneh
- Rural District: Targavar

Population (2006)
  - Total: 141
- Time zone: UTC+3:30 (IRST)
  - Summer (DST): UTC+4:30 (IRDT)

Gerdah Belij (Persian: گرده بليج, also Romanized as Gerdah Belīj; also known as Gerdah Belej and Gerdeh Balīch) is a village in Targavar Rural District, Silvaneh District, Urmia County, West Azerbaijan Province, Iran. At the 2006 census, its population was 141, in 24 families.
