= Havanduk =

Havanduk هوندوک
- Village
- Location within Iran
- Coordinates: 37°25′03″N 45°00′42″E
- Country: Iran
- Province: West Azerbaijan
- County: Urmia
- Bakhsh: Central
- Rural District: Baranduz

Population (2006)
  - Total: 59
- Time zone: UTC+3:30 (IRST)
  - Summer (DST): UTC+4:30 (IRDT)

Havanduk (Persian: هوندوک, also Romanized as Havandūk; also known as Havandak) is a village in Baranduz Rural District, in the Central District of Urmia County, West Azerbaijan Province, Iran. At the 2006 census, its population was 59, in 15 families.
