= Do Bareh =

Do Bareh دوبره
- Village
- Location within Iran
- Coordinates: 37°36′23″N 44°47′32″E
- Country: Iran
- Province: West Azerbaijan
- County: Urmia
- Bakhsh: Silvaneh
- Rural District: Targavar

Population (2006)
  - Total: 276
- Time zone: UTC+3:30 (IRST)
  - Summer (DST): UTC+4:30 (IRDT)

Do Bareh (Persian: دوبره, also Romanized as Dobreh) is a village in Targavar Rural District, Silvaneh District, Urmia County, West Azerbaijan Province, Iran. At the 2006 census, its population was 276, in 41 families.
