= Jangeh, West Azerbaijan =

Village in West Azerbaijan province, Iran

Jangeh Persian: جنگه
- Village
- Location within Iran
- Coordinates: 36°20′01″N 45°27′50″E
- Country: Iran
- Province: West Azerbaijan
- County: Mirabad
- District: Zab
- Rural District: Melkari-ye Sharqi

Population (2016)
  - Total: 20
- Time zone: UTC+3:30 (IRST)

Jangeh (Persian: جنگه) (Note: Formerly known as Jamgeh (جمگه)) is a village in Melkari-ye Sharqi Rural District of Zab District in Mirabad County, West Azerbaijan province, Iran.

== Demographics ==
=== Population ===
At the time of the 2006 National Census, the village's population, as Jamgeh, was 60 in nine households, when it was in Melkari Rural District (Note: Renamed Melkari-ye Gharbi Rural District) of Vazineh District (Note: Renamed the Central District of Mirabad County) in Sardasht County. The following census in 2011 counted 34 people in eight households, by which time the name of the village had been changed to Jangeh. The 2016 census measured the population of the village as 20 people in six households.

In 2022, the district was separated from the county in the establishment of Mirabad County and renamed the Central District. The rural district was transferred to the new Zab District and renamed Melkari-ye Gharbi Rural District. Jangeh was transferred to Melkari-ye Sharqi Rural District created in the same district.
