= Hasanabad, Mirabad =

Village in West Azerbaijan province, Iran

Hasanabad Persian: حسن اباد
- Village
- Location within Iran
- Coordinates: 36°20′47″N 45°25′01″E
- Country: Iran
- Province: West Azerbaijan
- County: Mirabad
- District: Zab
- Rural District: Melkari-ye Sharqi

Population (2016)
  - Total: 38
- Time zone: UTC+3:30 (IRST)

Hasanabad (Persian: حسن اباد) (Note: Also romanized as Ḩasanābād) is a village in Melkari-ye Sharqi Rural District of Zab District in Mirabad County, West Azerbaijan province, Iran.

== Demographics ==
=== Population ===
At the time of the 2006 National Census, the village's population was 65 in 11 households, when it was in Gavork-e Nalin Rural District of Vazineh District (Note: Renamed the Central District of Mirabad County) in Sardasht County. The following census in 2011 counted 52 people in 10 households. The 2016 census measured the population of the village as 38 people in 10 households.

In 2022, the district was separated from the county in the establishment of Mirabad County and renamed the Central District. Hasanabad was transferred to Melkari-ye Sharqi Rural District created in the new Zab District.
