= Goman, West Azerbaijan =

Village in West Azerbaijan province, Iran

Goman Persian: گمان
- Village
- Location within Iran
- Coordinates: 36°21′29″N 45°25′51″E
- Country: Iran
- Province: West Azerbaijan
- County: Mirabad
- District: Zab
- Rural District: Melkari-ye Sharqi

Population (2016)
  - Total: 293
- Time zone: UTC+3:30 (IRST)

Goman (Persian: گمان) (Note: Also romanized as Gomān; also known as Gūmān (گومان)) is a village in Melkari-ye Sharqi Rural District of Zab District in Mirabad County, West Azerbaijan province, Iran.

== Demographics ==
=== Population ===
At the time of the 2006 National Census, the village's population was 399 in 63 households, when it was in Gavork-e Nalin Rural District of Vazineh District (Note: Renamed the Central District of Mirabad County) in Sardasht County. The following census in 2011 counted 318 people in 71 households. The 2016 census measured the population of the village as 293 people in 73 households.

In 2022, the district was separated from the county in the establishment of Mirabad County and renamed the Central District. Goman was transferred to Melkari-ye Sharqi Rural District created in the new Zab District.
