= Chowalan =

Village in West Azerbaijan province, Iran

Chowalan Persian: چوالان
- Village
- Location within Iran
- Coordinates: 36°21′53″N 45°30′30″E
- Country: Iran
- Province: West Azerbaijan
- County: Mirabad
- District: Zab
- Rural District: Melkari-ye Sharqi

Population (2016)
  - Total: 100
- Time zone: UTC+3:30 (IRST)

Chowalan (Persian: چوالان) (Note: Also romanized as Chowālān; also known as Chowlān) is a village in Melkari-ye Sharqi Rural District of Zab District in Mirabad County, West Azerbaijan province, Iran.

== Demographics ==
=== Population ===
At the time of the 2006 National Census, the village's population was 128 in 17 households, when it was in Melkari Rural District (Note: Renamed Melkari-ye Gharbi Rural District) of Vazineh District (Note: Renamed the Central District of Mirabad County) in Sardasht County. The following census in 2011 counted 125 people in 20 households. The 2016 census measured the population of the village as 100 people in 21 households.

In 2022, the district was separated from the county in the establishment of Mirabad County and renamed the Central District. The rural district was transferred to the new Zab District and renamed Melkari-ye Gharbi Rural District. Chowalan was transferred to Melkari-ye Sharqi Rural District created in the same district.
