= Kani Aspan =

Village in West Azerbaijan province, Iran

Kani Aspan Persian: كاني اسپان
- Village
- Location within Iran
- Coordinates: 36°21′49″N 45°31′08″E
- Country: Iran
- Province: West Azerbaijan
- County: Mirabad
- District: Zab
- Rural District: Melkari-ye Sharqi

Population (2016)
  - Total: 21
- Time zone: UTC+3:30 (IRST)

Kani Aspan (Persian: كاني اسپان) is a village in Melkari-ye Sharqi Rural District of Zab District in Mirabad County, West Azerbaijan province, Iran.

== Demographics ==
=== Population ===
At the time of the 2006 and 2011 National Censuses, the village's population was below the reporting threshold, when it was in Melkari Rural District (Note: Renamed Melkari-ye Gharbi Rural District) of Vazineh District (Note: Renamed the Central District of Mirabad County) in Sardasht County. The 2016 census measured the population of the village as 21 people in five households.

In 2022, the district was separated from the county in the establishment of Mirabad County and renamed the Central District. The rural district was transferred to the new Zab District and renamed Melkari-ye Gharbi Rural District. Kani Aspan was transferred to Melkari-ye Sharqi Rural District created in the same district.
