= Vavan =

Village in West Azerbaijan province, Iran

Vavan Persian: واوان
- Village
- Location within Iran
- Coordinates: 36°17′33″N 45°28′29″E
- Country: Iran
- Province: West Azerbaijan
- County: Mirabad
- District: Zab
- Rural District: Melkari-ye Sharqi

Population (2016)
  - Total: 792
- Time zone: UTC+3:30 (IRST)

Vavan (Persian: واوان) (Note: Also romanized as Vāvān) is a village in Melkari-ye Sharqi Rural District of Zab District in Mirabad County, West Azerbaijan province, Iran, serving as capital of the district.

== Demographics ==
=== Population ===
At the time of the 2006 National Census, the village's population was 842 in 146 households, when it was in Melkari Rural District (Note: Renamed Melkari-ye Gharbi Rural District) of Vazineh District (Note: Renamed the Central District of Mirabad County) in Sardasht County. The following census in 2011 counted 843 people in 181 households. The 2016 census measured the population of the village as 792 people in 195 households.

In 2022, the district was separated from the county in the establishment of Mirabad County and renamed the Central District. The rural district was transferred to the new Zab District and renamed Melkari-ye Gharbi Rural District. Vavan was transferred to Melkari-ye Sharqi Rural District created in the same district.
