= Shalman, West Azerbaijan =

Village in West Azerbaijan province, Iran

Shalman Persian: شلمن
- Village
- Location within Iran
- Coordinates: 36°21′19″N 45°26′56″E
- Country: Iran
- Province: West Azerbaijan
- County: Mirabad
- District: Zab
- Rural District: Melkari-ye Sharqi

Population (2016)
  - Total: 106
- Time zone: UTC+3:30 (IRST)

Shalman (Persian: شلمن) (Note: Also romanized as Shalmān) is a village in Melkari-ye Sharqi Rural District of Zab District in Mirabad County, West Azerbaijan province, Iran.

== Demographics ==
=== Population ===
At the time of the 2006 National Census, the village's population was 140 in 17 households, when it was in Gavork-e Nalin Rural District of Vazineh District (Note: Renamed the Central District of Mirabad County) in Sardasht County. The following census in 2011 counted 118 people in 16 households. The 2016 census measured the population of the village as 106 people in 13 households.

In 2022, the district was separated from the county in the establishment of Mirabad County and renamed the Central District. Shalman was transferred to Melkari-ye Sharqi Rural District created in the new Zab District.
