= Bariteh =

Village in West Azerbaijan province, Iran

Bariteh Persian: بريته
- Village
- Location within Iran
- Coordinates: 36°21′33″N 45°24′32″E
- Country: Iran
- Province: West Azerbaijan
- County: Mirabad
- District: Zab
- Rural District: Melkari-ye Sharqi

Population (2016)
  - Total: 122
- Time zone: UTC+3:30 (IRST)

Bariteh (Persian: بريته) (Note: Also romanized as Barīteh) is a village in Melkari-ye Sharqi Rural District of Zab District in Mirabad County, West Azerbaijan province, Iran.

== Demographics ==
=== Population ===
At the time of the 2006 National Census, the village's population was 151 in 24 households, when it was in Gavork-e Nalin Rural District of Vazineh District (Note: Renamed the Central District of Mirabad County) in Sardasht County. The following census in 2011 counted 126 people in 25 households. The 2016 census measured the population of the village as 122 people in 27 households.

In 2022, the district was separated from the county in the establishment of Mirabad County and renamed the Central District. Bariteh was transferred to Melkari-ye Sharqi Rural District created in the new Zab District.
