= Sarmargan-e Nalin =

Village in West Azerbaijan province, Iran

Sarmargan-e Nalin Persian: سرمرگان نعلين
- Village
- Location within Iran
- Country: Iran
- Province: West Azerbaijan
- County: Mirabad
- District: Zab
- Rural District: Melkari-ye Sharqi

Population (2016)
  - Total: 22
- Time zone: UTC+3:30 (IRST)

Sarmargan-e Nalin (Persian: سرمرگان نعلين) (Note: Also romanized as Sarmargan Naleyn and Sarmargān Na‘leyn; also known as Sepīdār Na‘leyn) is a village in Melkari-ye Sharqi Rural District of Zab District in Mirabad County, West Azerbaijan province, Iran.

== Demographics ==
=== Population ===
At the time of the 2006 National Census, the village's population was 97 in 13 households, when it was in Gavork-e Nalin Rural District of Vazineh District (Note: Renamed the Central District of Mirabad County) in Sardasht County. The following census in 2011 counted 100 people in 15 households. The 2016 census measured the population of the village as 22 people in four households.

In 2022, the district was separated from the county in the establishment of Mirabad County and renamed the Central District. Sarmargan-e Nalin was transferred to Melkari-ye Sharqi Rural District created in the new Zab District.
