= Nuaveh =

Village in West Azerbaijan province, Iran

Nuaveh Persian: نواوه
- Village
- Location within Iran
- Coordinates: 36°20′12″N 45°29′30″E
- Country: Iran
- Province: West Azerbaijan
- County: Mirabad
- District: Zab
- Rural District: Melkari-ye Sharqi

Population (2016)
  - Total: 299
- Time zone: UTC+3:30 (IRST)

Nuaveh (Persian: نواوه) (Note: Also romanized as Nūāveh; also known as Nūā Deh) is a village in, and the capital of, Melkari-ye Sharqi Rural District in Zab District of Mirabad County, West Azerbaijan province, Iran.

== Demographics ==
=== Population ===
At the time of the 2006 National Census, the village's population was 492 in 68 households, when it was in Melkari Rural District (Note: Renamed Melkari-ye Gharbi Rural District) of Vazineh District (Note: Renamed the Central District of Mirabad County) in Sardasht County. The following census in 2011 counted 414 people in 87 households. The 2016 census measured the population of the village as 299 people in 72 households.

In 2022, the district was separated from the county in the establishment of Mirabad County and renamed the Central District. The rural district was transferred to the new Zab District and renamed Melkari-ye Gharbi Rural District. Nuaveh was transferred to Melkari-ye Sharqi Rural District created in the same district.
