= Suneh =

Village in West Azerbaijan province, Iran

Suneh Persian: سونه
- Village
- Location within Iran
- Coordinates: 36°21′57″N 45°26′09″E
- Country: Iran
- Province: West Azerbaijan
- County: Mirabad
- District: Zab
- Rural District: Melkari-ye Sharqi

Population (2016)
  - Total: 205
- Time zone: UTC+3:30 (IRST)

Suneh (Persian: سونه) (Note: Also romanized as Sūneh) is a village in Melkari-ye Sharqi Rural District of Zab District in Mirabad County, West Azerbaijan province, Iran.

== Demographics ==
=== Population ===
At the time of the 2006 National Census, the village's population was 291 in 39 households, when it was in Gavork-e Nalin Rural District of Vazineh District (Note: Renamed the Central District of Mirabad County) in Sardasht County. The following census in 2011 counted 185 people in 27 households. The 2016 census measured the population of the village as 205 people in 49 households.

In 2022, the district was separated from the county in the establishment of Mirabad County and renamed the Central District. Suneh was transferred to Melkari-ye Sharqi Rural District created in the new Zab District.
