= Aghlan =

Village in West Azerbaijan province, Iran

Aghlan Persian: اغلان
- Village
- Location within Iran
- Coordinates: 36°17′22″N 45°25′45″E
- Country: Iran
- Province: West Azerbaijan
- County: Mirabad
- District: Zab
- Rural District: Melkari-ye Gharbi

Population (2016)
  - Total: 307
- Time zone: UTC+3:30 (IRST)

Aghlan (Persian: اغلان) (Note: Also romanized as Āghlān) is a village in, and the capital of, Melkari-ye Gharbi Rural District (Note: Formerly Melkari Rural District) in Zab District of Mirabad County, West Azerbaijan province, Iran. The previous capital of the rural district was the village of Nalas, now a city.

== Demographics ==
=== Population ===
At the time of the 2006 National Census, the village's population was 519 in 93 households, when it was in Melkari Rural District (Note: Renamed Melkari-ye Gharbi Rural District) of Vazineh District (Note: Renamed the Central District of Mirabad County) in Sardasht County. The following census in 2011 counted 399 people in 95 households. The 2016 census measured the population of the village as 307 people in 80 households.

In 2022, the district was separated from the county in the establishment of Mirabad County and renamed the Central District. The rural district was transferred to the new Zab District and renamed Melkari-ye Gharbi Rural District.
