= Mamakavah =

Village in West Azerbaijan province, Iran

Mamakavah Persian: مامكاوه
- Village
- Location within Iran
- Coordinates: 36°17′15″N 45°19′58″E
- Country: Iran
- Province: West Azerbaijan
- County: Mirabad
- District: Central
- Rural District: Savan

Population (2016)
  - Total: 348
- Time zone: UTC+3:30 (IRST)

Mamakavah (Persian: مامكاوه) (Note: Also romanized as Māmakāvah; also known as Mamaga and Māmakāvā) is a village in Savan Rural District of the Central District (Note: Formerly Vazineh District of Sardasht County) in Mirabad County, West Azerbaijan province, Iran.

== Demographics ==
=== Population ===
At the time of the 2006 National Census, the village's population was 397 in 75 households, when it was in Gavork-e Nalin Rural District of Vazineh District (Note: Renamed the Central District of Mirabad County) in Sardasht County. The following census in 2011 counted 330 people in 76 households. The 2016 census measured the population of the village as 348 people in 93 households.

In 2022, the district was separated from the county in the establishment of Mirabad County and renamed the Central District. Mamakavah was transferred to Savan Rural District created in the same district.
