= Gureh Shar =

Village in West Azerbaijan province, Iran

Gureh Shar Persian: گوره شر
- Village
- Location within Iran
- Coordinates: 36°17′36″N 45°17′08″E
- Country: Iran
- Province: West Azerbaijan
- County: Mirabad
- District: Central
- Rural District: Savan

Population (2016)
  - Total: 20
- Time zone: UTC+3:30 (IRST)

Gureh Shar (Persian: گوره شر) (Note: Also romanized as Gūreh Shar; also known as Gūreh Shīr) is a village in Savan Rural District of the Central District (Note: Formerly Vazineh District of Sardasht County) in Mirabad County, West Azerbaijan province, Iran.

== Demographics ==
=== Population ===
At the time of the 2006 National Census, the village's population was 83 in 12 households, when it was in Gavork-e Nalin Rural District of Vazineh District (Note: Renamed the Central District of Mirabad County) in Sardasht County. The following census in 2011 counted 49 people in 11 households. The 2016 census measured the population of the village as 20 people in seven households.

In 2022, the district was separated from the county in the establishment of Mirabad County and renamed the Central District. Gureh Shar was transferred to Savan Rural District created in the same district.
