= Darmagun Bash-e Bala =

Village in West Azerbaijan province, Iran

Darmagun Bash-e Bala Persian: دارمگون باش بالا
- Village
- Location within Iran
- Coordinates: 36°17′07″N 45°21′06″E
- Country: Iran
- Province: West Azerbaijan
- County: Mirabad
- District: Central
- Rural District: Savan

Population (2016)
  - Total: 164
- Time zone: UTC+3:30 (IRST)

Darmagun Bash-e Bala (Persian: دارمگون باش بالا) (Note: Formerly known as Darmakun (دارمكون), also romanized as Dārmakūn) is a village in Savan Rural District of the Central District (Note: Formerly Vazineh District of Sardasht County) in Mirabad County, West Azerbaijan province, Iran.

== Demographics ==
=== Population ===
At the time of the 2006 National Census, the village's population, as Darmakun, was 289 in 58 households, when it was in Gavork-e Nalin Rural District of Vazineh District (Note: Renamed the Central District of Mirabad County) in Sardasht County. The following census in 2011 counted 245 people in 51 households, by which time the village was listed as Darmagun Bash-e Bala. The 2016 census measured the population of the village as 164 people in 44 households.

In 2022, the district was separated from the county in the establishment of Mirabad County and renamed the Central District. Darmagun Bash-e Bala was transferred to Savan Rural District created in the same district.
