= Darmagun Bash-e Qobran =

Village in West Azerbaijan province, Iran

Darmagun Bash-e Qobran Persian: دارگون باش قبران
- Village
- Location within Iran
- Coordinates: 36°16′23″N 45°20′40″E
- Country: Iran
- Province: West Azerbaijan
- County: Mirabad
- District: Central
- Rural District: Savan

Population (2016)
  - Total: 51
- Time zone: UTC+3:30 (IRST)

Darmagun Bash-e Qobran (Persian: دارگون باش قبران) (Note: Formerly known as Pashqobran (پاش قبران), also romanized as Pāshqobrān; also known as Pāshqalāteh) is a village in Savan Rural District of the Central District (Note: Formerly Vazineh District of Sardasht County) in Mirabad County, West Azerbaijan province, Iran.

== Demographics ==
=== Population ===
At the time of the 2006 National Census, the village's population, as Pashqobran, was 71 in nine households, when it was in Gavork-e Nalin Rural District of Vazineh District (Note: Renamed the Central District of Mirabad County) in Sardasht County. The following census in 2011 counted 61 people in 14 households, by which time the village was listed as Darmagun Bash-e Qiran. The 2016 census measured the population of the village as 51 people in 15 households.

In 2022, the district was separated from the county in the establishment of Mirabad County and renamed the Central District. Darmagun Bash-e Qobran was transferred to Savan Rural District created in the same district.
