= Gakowzheh-ye Olya =

Village in West Azerbaijan province, Iran

Gakowzheh-ye Olya Persian: گاكوژه عليا
- Village
- Location within Iran
- Coordinates: 36°19′30″N 45°27′06″E
- Country: Iran
- Province: West Azerbaijan
- County: Mirabad
- District: Zab
- Rural District: Melkari-ye Sharqi

Population (2016)
  - Total: 21
- Time zone: UTC+3:30 (IRST)

Gakowzheh-ye Olya (Persian: گاكوژه عليا) (Note: Also romanized as Gākowzheh-ye ‘Olyā; also known as Kākowzheh-ye ‘Olyā) is a village in Melkari-ye Sharqi Rural District of Zab District in Mirabad County, West Azerbaijan province, Iran.

== Demographics ==
=== Population ===
At the time of the 2006 National Census, the village's population was 21 in five households, when it was in Melkari Rural District (Note: Renamed Melkari-ye Gharbi Rural District) of Vazineh District (Note: Renamed the Central District of Mirabad County) in Sardasht County. The following census in 2011 counted a population below the reporting threshold. The 2016 census measured the population of the village as 21 people in five households.

In 2022, the district was separated from the county in the establishment of Mirabad County and renamed the Central District. The rural district was transferred to the new Zab District and renamed Melkari-ye Gharbi Rural District. Gakowzheh-ye Olya was transferred to Melkari-ye Sharqi Rural District created in the same district.
