= Mazraeh, Mirabad =

Village in West Azerbaijan province, Iran

Mazraeh Persian: مزرعه
- Village
- Location within Iran
- Coordinates: 36°16′32″N 45°20′25″E
- Country: Iran
- Province: West Azerbaijan
- County: Mirabad
- District: Central
- Rural District: Savan

Population (2016)
  - Total: 523
- Time zone: UTC+3:30 (IRST)

Mazraeh (Persian: مزرعه) (Note: Also romanized as Mazra‘eh) is a village in, and the capital of, Savan Rural District in the Central District (Note: Formerly Vazineh District of Sardasht County) of Mirabad County, West Azerbaijan province, Iran.

== Demographics ==
=== Population ===
At the time of the 2006 National Census, the village's population was 509 in 89 households, when it was in Gavork-e Nalin Rural District of Vazineh District (Note: Renamed the Central District of Mirabad County) in Sardasht County. The following census in 2011 counted 532 people in 118 households. The 2016 census measured the population of the village as 523 people in 153 households.

In 2022, the district was separated from the county in the establishment of Mirabad County and renamed the Central District. Mazraeh was transferred to Savan Rural District created in the same district.
