= Almaran =

Village in West Azerbaijan province, Iran

Almaran Persian: ال مران
- Village
- Location within Iran
- Coordinates: 36°27′N 45°13′E
- Country: Iran
- Province: West Azerbaijan
- County: Mirabad
- District: Central
- Rural District: Savan

Population (2016)
  - Total: 76
- Time zone: UTC+3:30 (IRST)

Almaran (Persian: ال مران) (Note: Also romanized as Ālmarān) is a village in Savan Rural District of the Central District (Note: Formerly Vazineh District of Sardasht County) in Mirabad County, West Azerbaijan province, Iran.

== Demographics ==
=== Population ===
At the time of the 2006 National Census, the village's population was 107 in 16 households, when it was in Gavork-e Nalin Rural District of Vazineh District (Note: Renamed the Central District of Mirabad County) in Sardasht County. The following census in 2011 counted 84 people in 16 households. The 2016 census measured the population of the village as 76 people in 15 households.

In 2022, the district was separated from the county in the establishment of Mirabad County and renamed the Central District. Almaran was transferred to Savan Rural District created in the same district.
