= Kachalabad =

Kachalabad or Kachalobad (Persian: كچل اباد) may refer to:

- Kachalabad, Kermanshah
- Kachalabad, Sardasht, West Azerbaijan Province
- Kachalabad, alternate name of Kachaleh, West Azerbaijan, Urmia County, West Azerbaijan Province
