= Divalan =

Village in West Azerbaijan province, Iran

Divalan Persian: ديوالان
- Village
- Location within Iran
- Coordinates: 36°15′55″N 45°25′11″E
- Country: Iran
- Province: West Azerbaijan
- County: Mirabad
- District: Zab
- Rural District: Melkari-ye Gharbi

Population (2016)
  - Total: 415
- Time zone: UTC+3:30 (IRST)

Divalan (Persian: ديوالان) (Note: Also romanized as Dīvālān) is a village in Melkari-ye Gharbi Rural District (Note: Formerly Melkari Rural District) in Zab District of Mirabad County, West Azerbaijan province, Iran.

== Demographics ==
=== Population ===
At the time of the 2006 National Census, the village's population was 426 in 72 households, when it was in Melkari Rural District (Note: Renamed Melkari-ye Gharbi Rural District) of Vazineh District (Note: Renamed the Central District of Mirabad County) in Sardasht County. The following census in 2011 counted 373 people in 81 households. The 2016 census measured the population of the village as 415 people in 97 households.

In 2022, the district was separated from the county in the establishment of Mirabad County and renamed the Central District. The rural district was transferred to the new Zab District and renamed Melkari-ye Gharbi Rural District.
