= Digeh =

Village in West Azerbaijan province, Iran

Digeh Persian: ديگه
- Village
- Location within Iran
- Coordinates: 36°19′56″N 45°25′50″E
- Country: Iran
- Province: West Azerbaijan
- County: Mirabad
- District: Zab
- Rural District: Melkari-ye Sharqi

Population (2016)
  - Total: 63
- Time zone: UTC+3:30 (IRST)

Digeh (Persian: ديگه) (Note: Formerly known as Degeh (دگه)) is a village in Melkari-ye Sharqi Rural District of Zab District in Mirabad County, West Azerbaijan province, Iran.

== Demographics ==
=== Population ===
At the time of the 2006 National Census, the village's population, as Degeh, was 179 in 30 households, when it was in Melkari Rural District (Note: Renamed Melkari-ye Gharbi Rural District) of Vazineh District (Note: Renamed the Central District of Mirabad County) in Sardasht County. The following census in 2011 counted 99 people in 21 households, by which time the name of the village had been changed to Digeh. The 2016 census measured the population of the village as 63 people in 15 households.

In 2022, the district was separated from the county in the establishment of Mirabad County and renamed the Central District. The rural district was transferred to the new Zab District and renamed Melkari-ye Gharbi Rural District. Digeh was transferred to Melkari-ye Sharqi Rural District created in the same district.
