= Ziveh, Melkari-ye Gharbi =

Village in West Azerbaijan province, Iran

Ziveh Persian: زيوه
- Village
- Location within Iran
- Coordinates: 36°14′10″N 45°26′30″E
- Country: Iran
- Province: West Azerbaijan
- County: Mirabad
- District: Zab
- Rural District: Melkari-ye Gharbi

Population (2016)
  - Total: 347
- Time zone: UTC+3:30 (IRST)

Ziveh (Persian: زيوه) (Note: Also romanized as Zīveh) is a village in Melkari-ye Gharbi Rural District (Note: Formerly Melkari Rural District) in Zab District of Mirabad County, West Azerbaijan province, Iran.

== Demographics ==
=== Population ===
At the time of the 2006 National Census, the village's population was 386 in 75 households, when it was in Melkari Rural District (Note: Renamed Melkari-ye Gharbi Rural District) of Vazineh District (Note: Renamed the Central District of Mirabad County) in Sardasht County. The following census in 2011 counted 222 people in 49 households. The 2016 census measured the population of the village as 347 people in 87 households.

In 2022, the district was separated from the county in the establishment of Mirabad County and renamed the Central District. The rural district was transferred to the new Zab District and renamed Melkari-ye Gharbi Rural District.
