= Sireh Marg =

Village in West Azerbaijan province, Iran

Sireh Marg Persian: سيره مرگ
- Village
- Location within Iran
- Coordinates: 36°16′24″N 45°22′13″E
- Country: Iran
- Province: West Azerbaijan
- County: Mirabad
- District: Central
- Rural District: Savan

Population (2016)
  - Total: 58
- Time zone: UTC+3:30 (IRST)

Sireh Marg (Persian: سيره مرگ) (Note: Also romanized as Sīreh Marg) is a village in Savan Rural District of the Central District (Note: Formerly Vazineh District of Sardasht County) in Mirabad County, West Azerbaijan province, Iran.

== Demographics ==
=== Population ===
At the time of the 2006 National Census, the village's population was 64 in nine households, when it was in Gavork-e Nalin Rural District of Vazineh District (Note: Renamed the Central District of Mirabad County) in Sardasht County. The following census in 2011 counted 51 people in 10 households. The 2016 census measured the population of the village as 58 people in 14 households.

In 2022, the district was separated from the county in the establishment of Mirabad County and renamed the Central District. Sireh Marg was transferred to Savan Rural District created in the same district.
