= Kachalabad, Mirabad =

Village in West Azerbaijan province, Iran

Kachalabad Persian: كچل اباد
- Village
- Location within Iran
- Coordinates: 36°20′37″N 45°25′19″E
- Country: Iran
- Province: West Azerbaijan
- County: Mirabad
- District: Zab
- Rural District: Melkari-ye Sharqi

Population (2016)
  - Total: 142
- Time zone: UTC+3:30 (IRST)

Kachalabad (Persian: كچل اباد) (Note: Also romanized as Kachalābād) is a village in Melkari-ye Sharqi Rural District of Zab District in Mirabad County, West Azerbaijan province, Iran.

== Demographics ==
=== Population ===
At the time of the 2006 National Census, the village's population was 187 in 36 households, when it was in Gavork-e Nalin Rural District of Vazineh District (Note: Renamed the Central District of Mirabad County) in Sardasht County. The following census in 2011 counted 150 people in 36 households. The 2016 census measured the population of the village as 142 people in 37 households.

In 2022, the district was separated from the county in the establishment of Mirabad County and renamed the Central District. Kachalabad was transferred to Melkari-ye Sharqi Rural District created in the new Zab District.
