= Gakowzheh-ye Sofla =

Village in West Azerbaijan province, Iran

Gakowzheh-ye Sofla Persian: گاكوژه سفلي
- Village
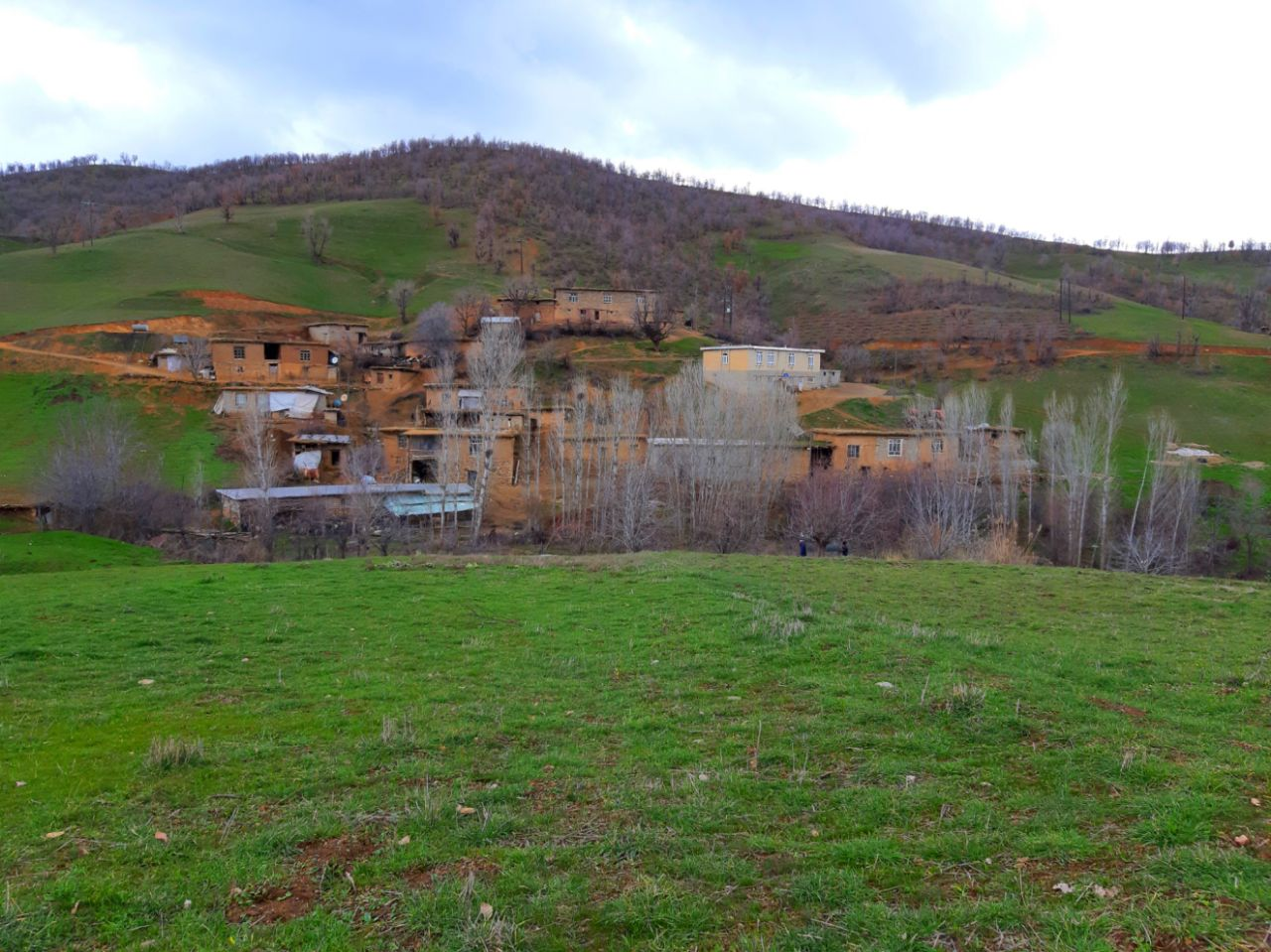
- The village of Gakowzheh-ye Sofla

- Location within Iran
- Coordinates: 36°19′26″N 45°27′43″E
- Country: Iran
- Province: West Azerbaijan
- County: Mirabad
- District: Zab
- Rural District: Melkari-ye Sharqi

Population (2016)
  - Total: 39
- Time zone: UTC+3:30 (IRST)

Gakowzheh-ye Sofla (Persian: گاكوژه سفلي) (Note: Also romanized as Gākowzheh-ye Soflá; also known as Kākowzheh-ye Soflá) is a village in Melkari-ye Sharqi Rural District of Zab District in Mirabad County, West Azerbaijan province, Iran.

== Demographics ==
=== Population ===
At the time of the 2006 National Census, the village's population was 40 in six households, when it was in Melkari Rural District (Note: Renamed Melkari-ye Gharbi Rural District) of Vazineh District (Note: Renamed the Central District of Mirabad County) in Sardasht County. The following census in 2011 counted 27 people in five households. The 2016 census measured the population of the village as 39 people in 10 households.

In 2022, the district was separated from the county in the establishment of Mirabad County and renamed the Central District. The rural district was transferred to the new Zab District and renamed Melkari-ye Gharbi Rural District. Gakowzheh-ye Sofla was transferred to Melkari-ye Sharqi Rural District created in the same district.
