= Alvatan =

Village in West Azerbaijan province, Iran

Alvatan Persian: الواتان
- Village
- Location within Iran
- Coordinates: 36°23′48″N 45°20′09″E
- Country: Iran
- Province: West Azerbaijan
- County: Mirabad
- District: Central
- Rural District: Savan

Population (2016)
  - Total: 931
- Time zone: UTC+3:30 (IRST)

Alvatan (Persian: الواتان) (Note: Also romanized as Ālvātān; also known as Ālātān) is a village in Savan Rural District of the Central District (Note: Formerly Vazineh District of Sardasht County) in Mirabad County, West Azerbaijan province, Iran.

== Demographics ==
=== Population ===
At the time of the 2006 National Census, the village's population was 977 in 139 households, when it was in Gavork-e Nalin Rural District of Vazineh District (Note: Renamed the Central District of Mirabad County) in Sardasht County. The following census in 2011 counted 913 people in 177 households. The 2016 census measured the population of the village as 931 people in 221 households.

In 2022, the district was separated from the county in the establishment of Mirabad County and renamed the Central District. Alvatan was transferred to Savan Rural District created in the same district.
