= Qaleh-ye Tasian =

Qaleh-ye Tasian قلعه تاسيان
- Village
- Location within Iran
- Coordinates: 36°23′07″N 45°24′43″E
- Country: Iran
- Province: West Azerbaijan
- County: Sardasht
- Bakhsh: Vazineh
- Rural District: Gavork-e Nalin

Population (2006)
  - Total: 180
- Time zone: UTC+3:30 (IRST)
  - Summer (DST): UTC+4:30 (IRDT)

Qaleh-ye Tasian (Persian: قلعه تاسيان, also Romanized as Qal‘eh-ye Tāsīān) is a village in Gavork-e Nalin Rural District, Vazineh District, Sardasht County, West Azerbaijan Province, Iran. At the 2006 census, its population was 180, in 23 families.
