= Khalisan =

Khalisan خليسان
- Village
- Location within Iran
- Coordinates: 36°17′47″N 45°29′26″E
- Country: Iran
- Province: West Azerbaijan
- County: Sardasht
- Bakhsh: Vazineh
- Rural District: Melkari

Population (2006)
  - Total: 123
- Time zone: UTC+3:30 (IRST)
  - Summer (DST): UTC+4:30 (IRDT)

Khalisan (Persian: خليسان, also Romanized as Khalīsān) is a village in Melkari Rural District, Vazineh District, Sardasht County, West Azerbaijan Province, Iran. At the 2006 census, its population was 123, in 19 families.
