= Savan, West Azerbaijan =

Village in West Azerbaijan province, Iran

Savan Persian: ساوان
- Village
- Location within Iran
- Coordinates: 36°17′57″N 45°20′00″E
- Country: Iran
- Province: West Azerbaijan
- County: Mirabad
- District: Central
- Rural District: Savan

Population (2016)
  - Total: 158
- Time zone: UTC+3:30 (IRST)

Savan (Persian: ساوان) (Note: Also romanized as Sāvān) is a village in Savan Rural District of the Central District (Note: Formerly Vazineh District of Sardasht County) in Mirabad County, West Azerbaijan province, Iran.

== Demographics ==
=== Population ===
At the time of the 2006 National Census, the village's population was 151 in 21 households, when it was in Gavork-e Nalin Rural District of Vazineh District (Note: Renamed the Central District of Mirabad County) in Sardasht County. The following census in 2011 counted 159 people in 32 households. The 2016 census measured the population of the village as 158 people in 43 households.

In 2022, the district was separated from the county in the establishment of Mirabad County and renamed the Central District. Savan was transferred to Savan Rural District created in the same district.
