= Neyzeh =

Neyzeh (Persian: نيزه) may refer to:

- Neyzeh-ye Olya
- Neyzeh-ye Sofla
