= Sustan-e Sofla =

Sustan-e Sofla سوستان سفلي
- Village
- Location within Iran
- Coordinates: 36°26′51″N 45°22′47″E
- Country: Iran
- Province: West Azerbaijan
- County: Sardasht
- Bakhsh: Vazineh
- Rural District: Gavork-e Nalin

Population (2006)
  - Total: 168
- Time zone: UTC+3:30 (IRST)
  - Summer (DST): UTC+4:30 (IRDT)

Sustan-e Sofla (Persian: سوستان سفلي, also Romanized as Sūstān-e Soflá) is a village in Gavork-e Nalin Rural District, Vazineh District, Sardasht County, West Azerbaijan Province, Iran. At the 2006 census, its population was 168, in 20 families.
