= Sepidareh-ye Darmeh =

Village in West Azerbaijan province, Iran

Sepidareh-ye Darmeh Persian: سپيداره دارمه
- Village
- Location within Iran
- Coordinates: 36°16′19″N 45°21′12″E
- Country: Iran
- Province: West Azerbaijan
- County: Mirabad
- District: Central
- Rural District: Savan

Population (2016)
  - Total: 137
- Time zone: UTC+3:30 (IRST)

Sepidareh-ye Darmeh (Persian: سپيداره دارمه) (Note: Also romanized as Sepīdāreh-ye Dārmeh; also known as Darmeh) is a village in Savan Rural District of the Central District (Note: Formerly Vazineh District of Sardasht County) in Mirabad County, West Azerbaijan province, Iran.

== Demographics ==
=== Population ===
At the time of the 2006 National Census, the village's population was 152 in 28 households, when it was in Gavork-e Nalin Rural District of Vazineh District (Note: Renamed the Central District of Mirabad County) in Sardasht County. The following census in 2011 counted 145 people in 35 households. The 2016 census measured the population of the village as 137 people in 38 households.

In 2022, the district was separated from the county in the establishment of Mirabad County and renamed the Central District. Sepidareh-ye Darmeh was transferred to Savan Rural District created in the same district.
