= Dowli Khanvan =

Village in West Azerbaijan province, Iran

Dowli Khanvan Persian: دولي خانوان
- Village
- Location within Iran
- Coordinates: 36°15′11″N 45°20′36″E
- Country: Iran
- Province: West Azerbaijan
- County: Mirabad
- District: Central
- Rural District: Savan

Population (2016)
  - Total: 224
- Time zone: UTC+3:30 (IRST)

Dowli Khanvan (Persian: دولي خانوان) (Note: Also romanized as Dowlī Khānvān) is a village in Savan Rural District of the Central District (Note: Formerly Vazineh District of Sardasht County) in Mirabad County, West Azerbaijan province, Iran.

== Demographics ==
=== Population ===
At the time of the 2006 National Census, the village's population was 253 in 47 households, when it was in Baryaji Rural District of the Central District in Sardasht County. The following census in 2011 counted 227 people in 56 households. The 2016 census measured the population of the village as 224 people in 64 households.

In 2022, Dowli Khanvan was separated from the county in the establishment of Mirabad County and transferred to Savan Rural District created in the Central District.
