= Kani Zard =

Village in West Azerbaijan province, Iran

Kani Zard Persian: كاني زرد
- Village
- Location within Iran
- Coordinates: 36°14′54″N 45°20′27″E
- Country: Iran
- Province: West Azerbaijan
- County: Mirabad
- District: Central
- Rural District: Savan

Population (2016)
  - Total: 740
- Time zone: UTC+3:30 (IRST)

Kani Zard (Persian: كاني زرد) (Note: Also romanized as Kānī Zard) is a village in Savan Rural District of the Central District (Note: Formerly Vazineh District of Sardasht County) in Mirabad County, West Azerbaijan province, Iran.

== Demographics ==
=== Population ===
At the time of the 2006 National Census, the village's population was 758 in 151 households, when it was in Baryaji Rural District of the Central District in Sardasht County. The following census in 2011 counted 782 people in 187 households. The 2016 census measured the population of the village as 740 people in 191 households.

In 2022, Kani Zard was separated from the county in the establishment of Mirabad County and transferred to Savan Rural District created in the Central District.
