= Dowlahtu =

Dowlahtu or Dowlehtu (Persian: دوله تو) may refer to:

- Dowlahtu, Gavork-e Nalin
- Dowlehtu, Melkari
