= Chaku =

Village in West Azerbaijan province, Iran

Chaku Persian: چكو
- Village
- Location within Iran
- Coordinates: 36°26′50″N 45°20′52″E
- Country: Iran
- Province: West Azerbaijan
- County: Mirabad
- District: Central
- Rural District: Gavork-e Nalin

Population (2016)
  - Total: 400
- Time zone: UTC+3:30 (IRST)

Chaku (Persian: چكو) (Note: Also romanized as Chakū) is a village in Gavork-e Nalin Rural District of the Central District (Note: Formerly Vazineh District of Sardasht County) in Mirabad County, West Azerbaijan province, Iran.

== Demographics ==
=== Population ===
At the time of the 2006 National Census, the village's population was 342 in 54 households, when it was in Vazineh District (Note: Renamed the Central District of Mirabad County) of Sardasht County. The following census in 2011 counted 361 people in 79 households. The 2016 census measured the population of the village as 400 people in 107 households.

In 2022, the district was separated from the county in the establishment of Mirabad County and renamed the Central District.
