= Niskabad =

Niskabad or Neysakabad (Persian: نيسك اباد) may refer to:

- Niskabad, Sardasht
- Neysakabad, Vazineh, Sardasht County
