= Shiveh Mer =

Village in West Azerbaijan province, Iran

Shiveh Mer Persian: شيوه مر
- Village
- Location within Iran
- Coordinates: 36°28′07″N 45°20′02″E
- Country: Iran
- Province: West Azerbaijan
- County: Mirabad
- District: Central
- Rural District: Gavork-e Nalin

Population (2016)
  - Total: 383
- Time zone: UTC+3:30 (IRST)

Shiveh Mer (Persian: شيوه مر) (Note: Also romanized as Shīveh Mer; also known as Shiveh Mir (شيوه مير) and Shīveh Mīreh) is a village in Gavork-e Nalin Rural District of the Central District (Note: Formerly Vazineh District of Sardasht County) in Mirabad County, West Azerbaijan province, Iran.

== Demographics ==
=== Population ===
At the time of the 2006 National Census, the village's population was 326 in 46 households, when it was in Vazineh District (Note: Renamed the Central District of Mirabad County) of Sardasht County. The following census in 2011 counted 357 people in 79 households. The 2016 census measured the population of the village as 383 people in 94 households.

In 2022, the district was separated from the county in the establishment of Mirabad County and renamed the Central District.
