= Sepidareh =

Sepidareh (Persian: سپيداره) may refer to:

- Sepidareh, Namshir, Baneh County, Kurdistan Province
- Sepidareh, West Azerbaijan
- Sepidareh-ye Darmeh, West Azerbaijan Province
