= Kachaleh =

Kachaleh or Kachleh (Persian: كچله) may refer to:

- Kachleh, Kurdistan
- Kachaleh, West Azerbaijan
