= Si Pakan =

Village in West Azerbaijan province, Iran

Si Pakan Persian: سيپكان
- Village
- Location within Iran
- Coordinates: 36°27′41″N 45°18′51″E
- Country: Iran
- Province: West Azerbaijan
- County: Mirabad
- District: Central
- Rural District: Gavork-e Nalin

Population (2016)
  - Total: 305
- Time zone: UTC+3:30 (IRST)

Si Pakan (Persian: سيپكان) (Note: Also romanized as Sī Pakān) is a village in Gavork-e Nalin Rural District of the Central District (Note: Formerly Vazineh District of Sardasht County) in Mirabad County, West Azerbaijan province, Iran.

== Demographics ==
=== Population ===
At the time of the 2006 National Census, the village's population was 334 in 52 households, when it was in Vazineh District (Note: Renamed the Central District of Mirabad County) of Sardasht County. The following census in 2011 counted 299 people in 58 households. The 2016 census measured the population of the village as 305 people in 79 households.

In 2022, the district was separated from the county in the establishment of Mirabad County and renamed the Central District.
