= Gozileh =

Village in West Azerbaijan province, Iran

Gozileh Persian: گزيله
- Village
- Location within Iran
- Coordinates: 36°23′47″N 45°22′07″E
- Country: Iran
- Province: West Azerbaijan
- County: Mirabad
- District: Central
- Rural District: Gavork-e Nalin

Population (2016)
  - Total: 357
- Time zone: UTC+3:30 (IRST)

Gozileh (Persian: گزيله) (Note: Also romanized as Gozīleh; also known as Govīzīleh) is a village in Gavork-e Nalin Rural District of the Central District (Note: Formerly Vazineh District of Sardasht County) in Mirabad County, West Azerbaijan province, Iran.

== Demographics ==
=== Population ===
At the time of the 2006 National Census, the village's population was 356 in 59 households, when it was in Vazineh District (Note: Renamed the Central District of Mirabad County) of Sardasht County. The following census in 2011 counted 342 people in 59 households. The 2016 census measured the population of the village as 357 people in 77 households.

In 2022, the district was separated from the county in the establishment of Mirabad County and renamed the Central District.
