= Nowkan, West Azerbaijan =

Village in West Azerbaijan province, Iran

Nowkan Persian: نوكان
- Village
- Location within Iran
- Coordinates: 36°16′15″N 45°18′41″E
- Country: Iran
- Province: West Azerbaijan
- County: Mirabad
- District: Central
- Rural District: Savan

Population (2016)
  - Total: 82
- Time zone: UTC+3:30 (IRST)

Nowkan (Persian: نوكان) (Note: Also romanized as Nowkān) is a village in Savan Rural District of the Central District (Note: Formerly Vazineh District of Sardasht County) in Mirabad County, West Azerbaijan province, Iran.

== Demographics ==
=== Population ===
At the time of the 2006 National Census, the village's population was 72 in 13 households, when it was in Baryaji Rural District of the Central District in Sardasht County. The following census in 2011 counted 77 people in 15 households. The 2016 census measured the population of the village as 82 people in 19 households.

In 2022, Nowkan was separated from the county in the establishment of Mirabad County and transferred to Savan Rural District created in the Central District.
