= Shatman =

Shatman شتمان
- Village
- Location within Iran
- Coordinates: 36°17′02″N 45°27′42″E
- Country: Iran
- Province: West Azerbaijan
- County: Sardasht
- Bakhsh: Vazineh
- Rural District: Melkari

Population (2006)
  - Total: 46
- Time zone: UTC+3:30 (IRST)
  - Summer (DST): UTC+4:30 (IRDT)

Shatman (Persian: شتمان, also Romanized as Shātmān) is a village in Melkari Rural District, Vazineh District, Sardasht County, West Azerbaijan province, Iran. At the 2006 census, its population was 46, in 6 families.
