= Garzhal =

Garzhal (Persian: گرژال) may refer to:

- Garzhal-e Olya
- Garzhal-e Sofla
