= Narast =

Narast نارست
- Village
- Location within Iran
- Coordinates: 36°14′26″N 45°23′45″E
- Country: Iran
- Province: West Azerbaijan
- County: Sardasht
- Bakhsh: Vazineh
- Rural District: Melkari

Population (2006)
  - Total: 115
- Time zone: UTC+3:30 (IRST)
  - Summer (DST): UTC+4:30 (IRDT)

Narast (Persian: نارست, also Romanized as Nārast) is a village in Melkari Rural District, Vazineh District, Sardasht County, West Azerbaijan Province, Iran. At the 2006 census, its population was 115, in 20 families.
