= Nivazh =

Village in West Azerbaijan province, Iran

Nivazh Persian: نيوژ
- Village
- Location within Iran
- Coordinates: 36°25′33″N 45°23′57″E
- Country: Iran
- Province: West Azerbaijan
- County: Mirabad
- District: Central
- Rural District: Gavork-e Nalin

Population (2016)
  - Total: 274
- Time zone: UTC+3:30 (IRST)

Nivazh (Persian: نيوژ) (Note: Formerly known as Nivash (نيواش), also romanized as Nīvāsh) is a village in Gavork-e Nalin Rural District of the Central District (Note: Formerly Vazineh District of Sardasht County) in Mirabad County, West Azerbaijan province, Iran.

== Demographics ==
=== Population ===
At the time of the 2006 National Census, the village's population, as Nivash, was 263 in 31 households, when it was in Vazineh District (Note: Renamed the Central District of Mirabad County) of Sardasht County. The following census in 2011 counted 227 people in 32 households, by which time the name of the village had been changed to Nivazh. The 2016 census measured the population of the village as 274 people in 64 households.

In 2022, the district was separated from the county in the establishment of Mirabad County and renamed the Central District.
