= Degeh =

Degeh (Persian: دگه) may refer to:

- Degeh, Sardasht
- Degeh, Vazineh, Sardasht County
