= Dowlahtu, Savan =

Village in West Azerbaijan province, Iran

Dowlahtu Persian: دۆڵەتوو
- Village
- Location within Iran
- Coordinates: 36°19′08″N 45°17′55″E
- Country: Iran
- Province: West Azerbaijan
- County: Mirabad
- District: Central
- Rural District: Savan

Population (2016)
  - Total: 834
- Time zone: UTC+3:30 (IRST)

Dowlahtu (Persian: دوله تو) (Note: Also romanized as Dowlahtū; also known as Dolatū and Dowlatū) is a village in Savan Rural District of the Central District (Note: Formerly Vazineh District of Sardasht County) in Mirabad County, West Azerbaijan province, Iran.

== Demographics ==
=== Population ===
At the time of the 2006 National Census, the village's population was 678 in 103 households, when it was in Gavork-e Nalin Rural District of Vazineh District (Note: Renamed the Central District of Mirabad County) in Sardasht County. The following census in 2011 counted 823 people in 172 households. The 2016 census measured the population of the village as 834 people in 207 households.

In 2022, the district was separated from the county in the establishment of Mirabad County and renamed the Central District. Dowlahtu was transferred to Savan Rural District created in the same district.
