= Savan =

Savan may refer to:

- Savan (island), one of the Grenadine islands of St Vincent
- Savan, Kurdistan, a village in Iran
- Savan, West Azerbaijan, a village in Iran
- Savan-e Jadid, a village in Iran
- Savan Kotecha, songwriter
- David Savan, professor
- Shravana (month) or Savan, a month in the Hindu calendar (July-August)

== See also ==
- Sawan (disambiguation)
