= Nuchavan =

Nuchavan نوچوان
- Village
- Location within Iran
- Coordinates: 36°18′03″N 45°24′37″E
- Country: Iran
- Province: West Azerbaijan
- County: Sardasht
- Bakhsh: Vazineh
- Rural District: Melkari

Population (2006)
  - Total: 168
- Time zone: UTC+3:30 (IRST)
  - Summer (DST): UTC+4:30 (IRDT)

Nuchavan (Persian: نوچوان, also Romanized as Nūchavān) is a village in Melkari Rural District, Vazineh District, Sardasht County, West Azerbaijan Province, Iran. At the 2006 census, its population was 168, in 25 families.
