= Musalan =

Village in West Azerbaijan province, Iran

Musalan Persian: موسالان
- Village
- Location within Iran
- Coordinates: 36°22′39″N 45°24′07″E
- Country: Iran
- Province: West Azerbaijan
- County: Mirabad
- District: Central
- Rural District: Gavork-e Nalin

Population (2016)
  - Total: 611
- Time zone: UTC+3:30 (IRST)

Musalan (Persian: موسالان) (Note: Also romanized as Mūsālān) is a village in, and the capital of, Gavork-e Nalin Rural District in the Central District (Note: Formerly Vazineh District of Sardasht County) of Mirabad County, West Azerbaijan province, Iran. The previous capital of the rural district was the village of Mirabad, now a city.

== Demographics ==
=== Population ===
At the time of the 2006 National Census, the village's population was 572 in 85 households, when it was in Vazineh District (Note: Renamed the Central District of Mirabad County) of Sardasht County. The following census in 2011 counted 680 people in 126 households. The 2016 census measured the population of the village as 611 people in 141 households.

In 2022, the district was separated from the county in the establishment of Mirabad County and renamed the Central District.
