= Golkanak =

Village in West Azerbaijan province, Iran

Golkanak Persian: گل كانك
- Village
- Location within Iran
- Coordinates: 36°15′12″N 45°20′38″E
- Country: Iran
- Province: West Azerbaijan
- County: Mirabad
- District: Central
- Rural District: Savan

Population (2016)
  - Total: 534
- Time zone: UTC+3:30 (IRST)

Golkanak (Persian: گل كانك) (Note: Also romanized as Golkānak; also known as Gol Kanag) is a village in Savan Rural District of the Central District (Note: Formerly Vazineh District of Sardasht County) in Mirabad County, West Azerbaijan province, Iran.

== Demographics ==
=== Population ===
At the time of the 2006 National Census, the village's population was 472 in 86 households, when it was in Baryaji Rural District of the Central District in Sardasht County. The following census in 2011 counted 463 people in 106 households. The 2016 census measured the population of the village as 534 people in 140 households.

In 2022, Golkanak was separated from the county in the establishment of Mirabad County and transferred to Savan Rural District created in the Central District.
