= Gakowzheh =

Gakowzheh (Persian: گاكوژه), also rendered as Kakowzheh, may refer to:

- Gakowzheh-ye Olya
- Gakowzheh-ye Sofla
