= Eshkhal =

Village in West Azerbaijan province, Iran

Eshkhal Persian: اشخل
- Village
- Location within Iran
- Coordinates: 36°23′36″N 45°26′32″E
- Country: Iran
- Province: West Azerbaijan
- County: Mirabad
- District: Central
- Rural District: Gavork-e Nalin

Population (2016)
  - Total: 248
- Time zone: UTC+3:30 (IRST)

Eshkhal (Persian: اشخل) (Note: Also romanized as Eshkhāl; also known as Ishkhal, Shekhāl, and Sheykhal) is a village in Gavork-e Nalin Rural District of the Central District (Note: Formerly Vazineh District of Sardasht County) in Mirabad County, West Azerbaijan province, Iran.

== Demographics ==
=== Population ===
At the time of the 2006 National Census, the village's population was 269 in 45 households, when it was in Vazineh District (Note: Renamed the Central District of Mirabad County) of Sardasht County. The following census in 2011 counted 214 people in 47 households. The 2016 census measured the population of the village as 248 people in 60 households.

In 2022, the district was separated from the county in the establishment of Mirabad County and renamed the Central District.
