= Garor =

Garor گرور
- Village
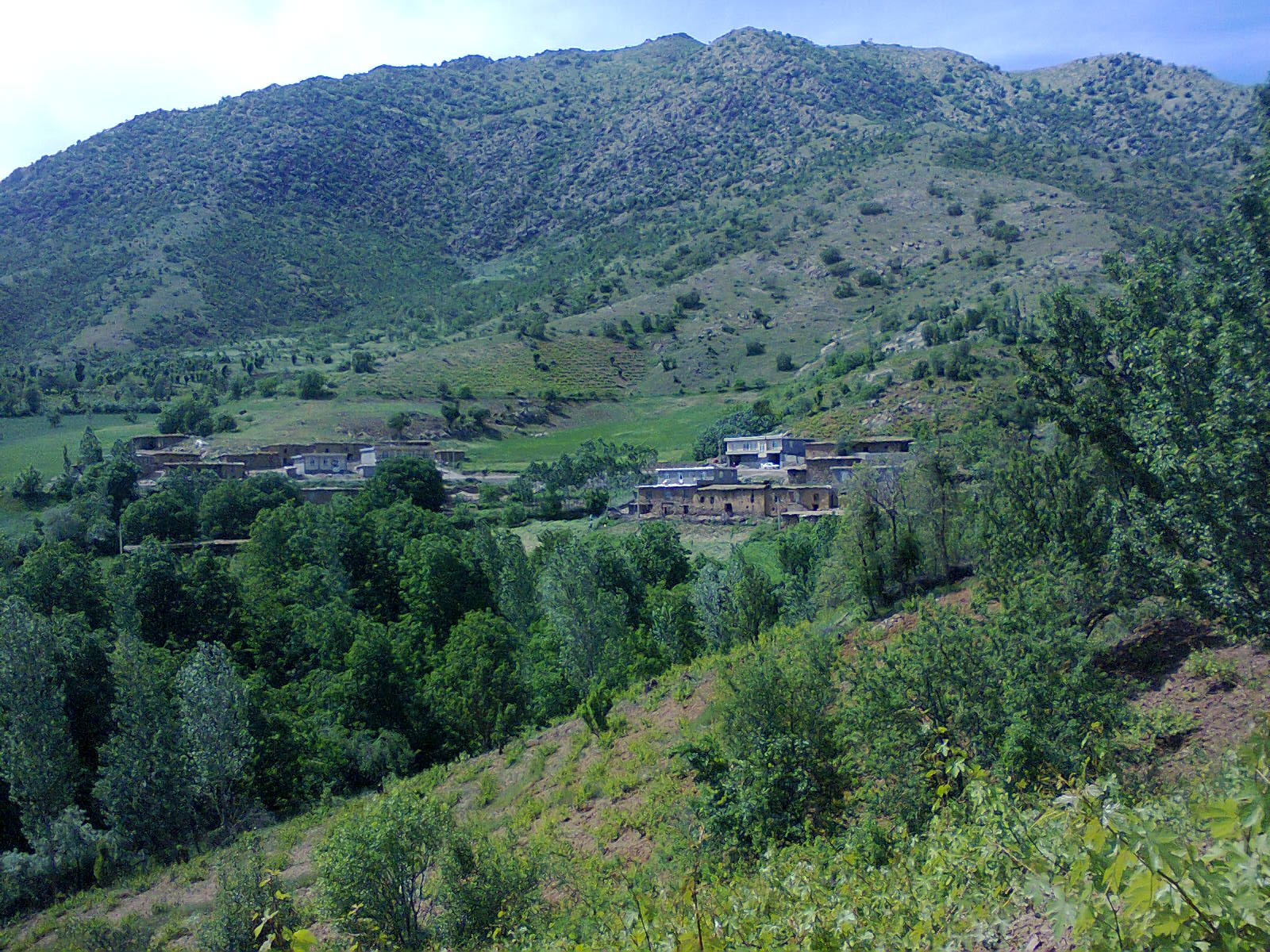
- village view

- Location within Iran
- Coordinates: 36°24′39″N 45°26′15″E
- Country: Iran
- Province: West Azerbaijan
- County: Sardasht
- Bakhsh: Vazineh
- Rural District: Gavork-e Nalin

Population (2006)
  - Total: 234
- Time zone: UTC+3:30 (IRST)
  - Summer (DST): UTC+4:30 (IRDT)

Garor (Persian: گرور; also known as Garvar) is a village in Gavork-e Nalin Rural District, Vazineh District, Sardasht County, West Azerbaijan Province, Iran. At the 2006 census, its population was 234, in 40 families.

== Tourist Attractions ==
Every year a large number of people from other parts of Iran and other countries, comes to Garor.

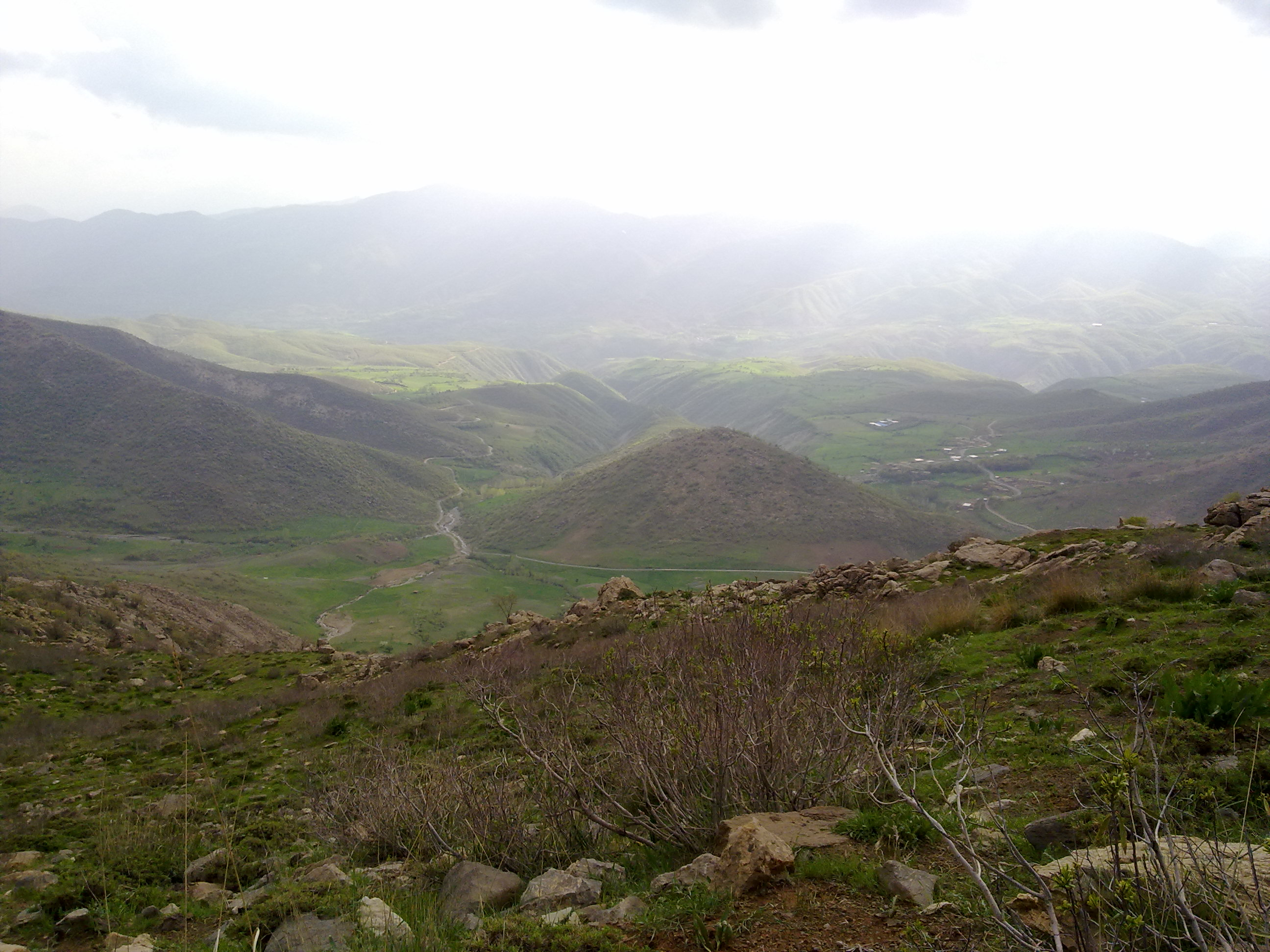
Perspective of Garor

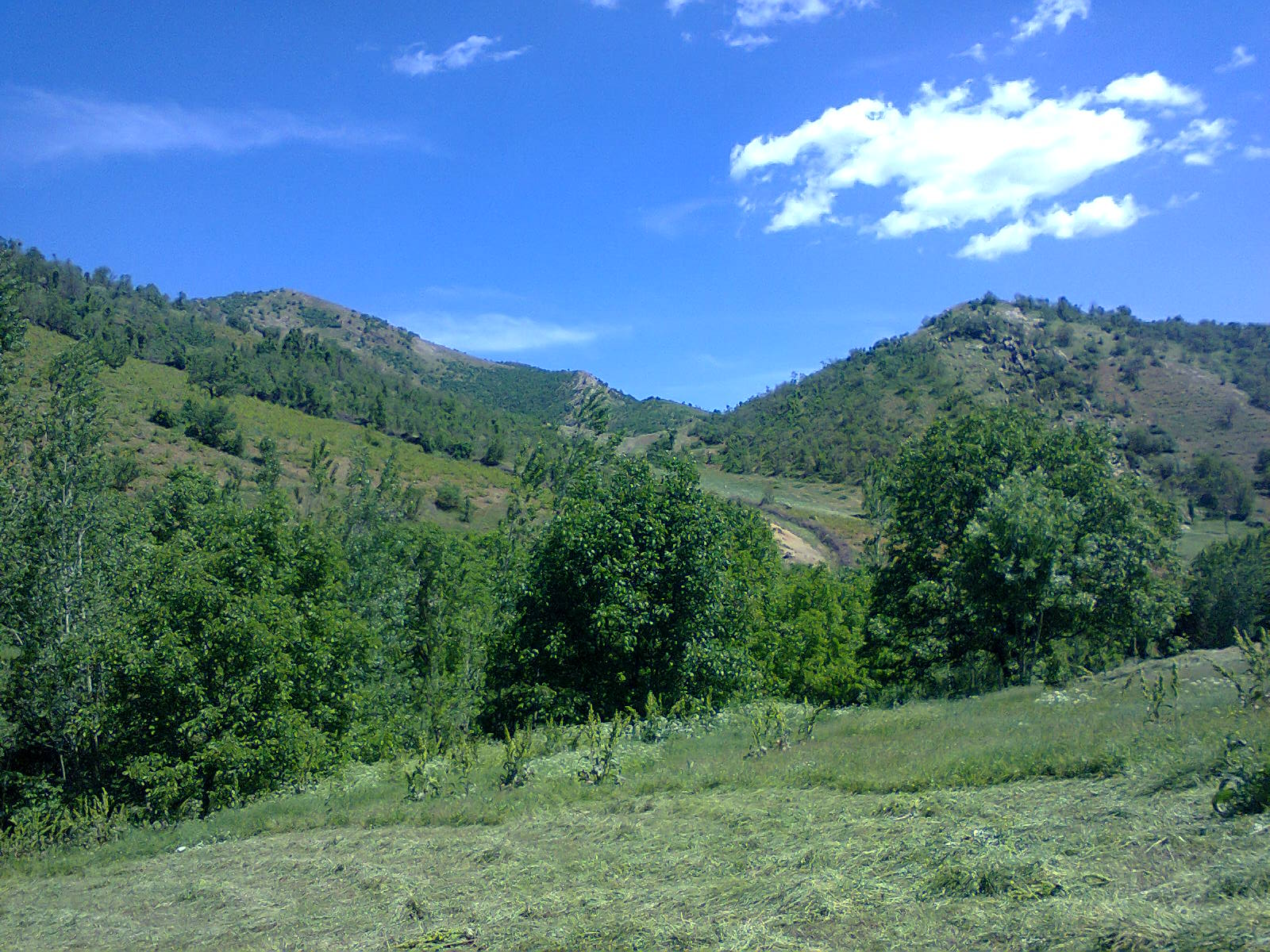
"Xale Same" Foothills in Garor

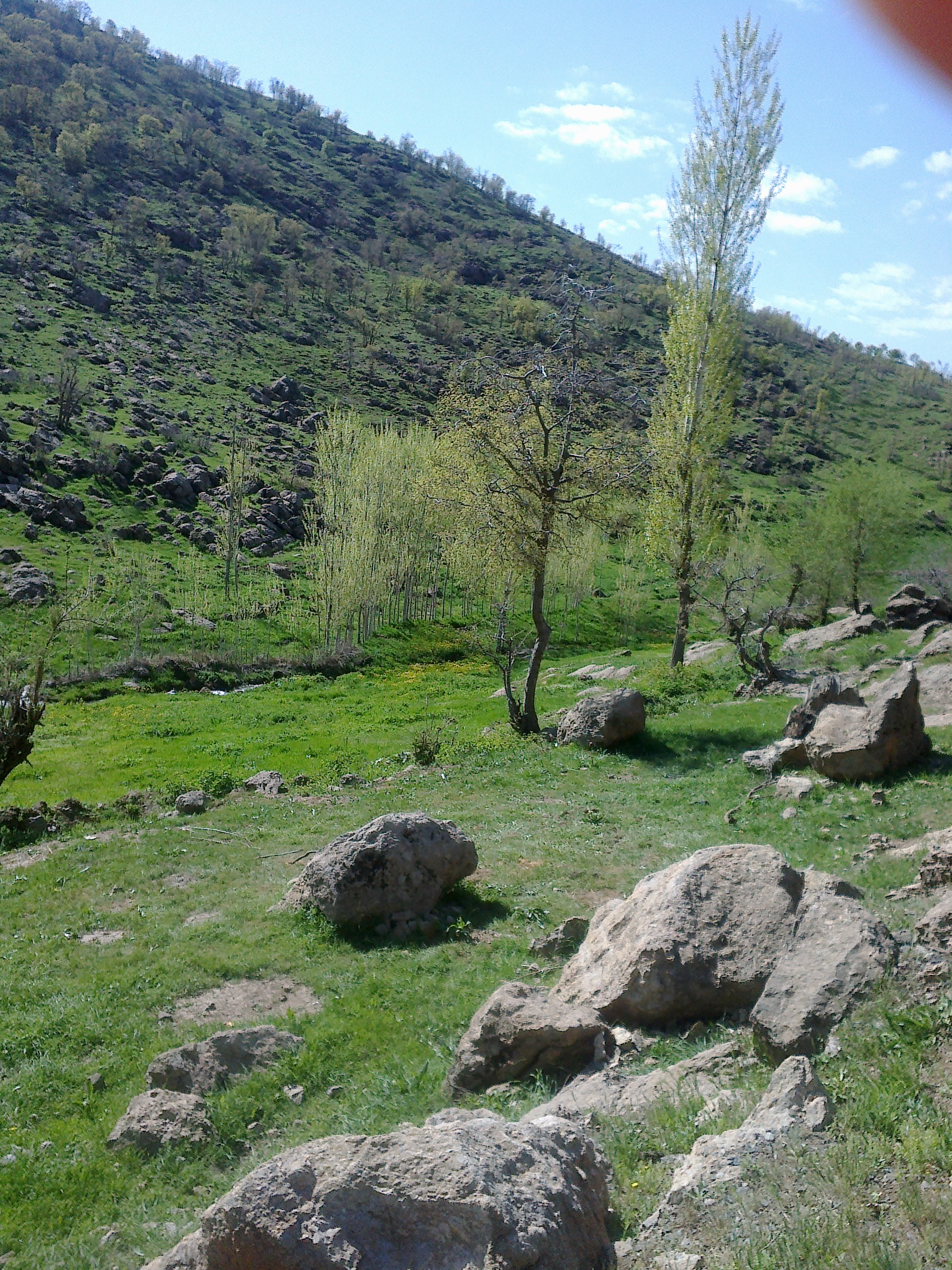
"Kawlan" Fountain in Garor

== Tribes ==
The tribes of Garor includes Khezri, Rasooli, Ahmadali, Ahmadani, Sorani, Gedrouni, Mohammadzadegan, Alizadeh, Pasandideh, Kabiri, Aboubakri, Hassani, Osmani, Hassanzade, Ahmadi and Hoveyda
