= Bilukeh =

Bilukeh بيلوكه
- Village
- Location within Iran
- Coordinates: 36°25′32″N 45°21′23″E
- Country: Iran
- Province: West Azerbaijan
- County: Sardasht
- Bakhsh: Vazineh
- Rural District: Gavork-e Nalin

Population (2006)
  - Total: 225
- Time zone: UTC+3:30 (IRST)
  - Summer (DST): UTC+4:30 (IRDT)

Bilukeh (Persian: بيلوكه, also Romanized as Bīlūkeh) is a village in Gavork-e Nalin Rural District, Vazineh District, Sardasht County, West Azerbaijan Province, Iran. At the 2006 census, its population was 225, in 34 families.
