= Neyzeh-ye Olya =

Neyzeh-ye Olya نيزه عليا
- Village
- Location within Iran
- Coordinates: 36°24′41″N 45°25′18″E
- Country: Iran
- Province: West Azerbaijan
- County: Sardasht
- Bakhsh: Vazineh
- Rural District: Gavork-e Nalin

Population (2006)
  - Total: 133
- Time zone: UTC+3:30 (IRST)
  - Summer (DST): UTC+4:30 (IRDT)

Neyzeh-ye Olya (Persian: نيزه عليا, also Romanized as Neyzeh-ye ‘Olyā) is a village in Gavork-e Nalin Rural District, Vazineh District, Sardasht County, West Azerbaijan Province, Iran. At the 2006 census, its population was 133, in 24 families.
