= Garzhal-e Olya =

Garzhal-e Olya گرژال عليا
- Village
- Location within Iran
- Coordinates: 36°19′03″N 45°26′32″E
- Country: Iran
- Province: West Azerbaijan
- County: Sardasht
- Bakhsh: Vazineh
- Rural District: Melkari

Population (2006)
  - Total: 90
- Time zone: UTC+3:30 (IRST)
  - Summer (DST): UTC+4:30 (IRDT)

Garzhal-e Olya (Persian: گرژال عليا, also Romanized as Garzhāl-e ‘Olyā) is a village in Melkari Rural District, Vazineh District, Sardasht County, West Azerbaijan province, Iran. At the 2006 census, its population was 90, in 16 families.
