= Savan-e Jadid =

Village in West Azerbaijan province, Iran

Savan-e Jadid Persian: ساوان جديد
- Village
- Location within Iran
- Coordinates: 36°17′56″N 45°20′04″E
- Country: Iran
- Province: West Azerbaijan
- County: Mirabad
- District: Central
- Rural District: Savan

Population (2016)
  - Total: 1,002
- Time zone: UTC+3:30 (IRST)

Savan-e Jadid (Persian: ساوان جديد) (Note: Also romanized as Sāvān-e Jadīd; also known as Sāvān) is a village in Savan Rural District of the Central District (Note: Formerly Vazineh District of Sardasht County) in Mirabad County, West Azerbaijan province, Iran.

== Demographics ==
=== Population ===
At the time of the 2006 National Census, the village's population was 553 in 98 households, when it was in Gavork-e Nalin Rural District of Vazineh District (Note: Renamed the Central District of Mirabad County) in Sardasht County. The following census in 2011 counted 821 people in 174 households. The 2016 census measured the population of the village as 1,002 people in 264 households. It was the most populous village in its rural district.

In 2022, the district was separated from the county in the establishment of Mirabad County and renamed the Central District. Savan-e Jadid was transferred to Savan Rural District created in the same district.
