= Neyzeh-ye Sofla =

Neyzeh-ye Sofla نيزه سفلي
- Village
- Location within Iran
- Coordinates: 36°24′46″N 45°24′59″E
- Country: Iran
- Province: West Azerbaijan
- County: Sardasht
- Bakhsh: Vazineh
- Rural District: Gavork-e Nalin

Population (2006)
  - Total: 159
- Time zone: UTC+3:30 (IRST)
  - Summer (DST): UTC+4:30 (IRDT)

Neyzeh-ye Sofla (Persian: نيزه سفلي, also Romanized as Neyzeh-ye Soflá) is a village in Gavork-e Nalin Rural District, Vazineh District, Sardasht County, West Azerbaijan Province, Iran. At the 2006 census, its population was 159, in 27 families.
