= Sawan (disambiguation) =

Sawan is the fifth month in the Hindu calendar, corresponding to July-August in the Gregorian calendar.

Sawan may also refer to:

== People ==
- Sawan Dutta, Indian music director, composer, songwriter, record producer, vocalist and Vlogger
- Sawan Faqir (died 1918), classical Sindhi poet
- Sawan Serasinghe (born 1994), Australian badminton player
- Sawan Singh (1858–1948), also known as "The Great Master" or "Bade Maharaj Ji", was an Indian Saint
- Wael Sawan (born 1974), Lebanese-Canadian business executive

== Places ==
- Sawan, Buleleng, a district (kecamatan) in the regency of Buleleng in northern Bali, Indonesia
- Sawan Airport, a private domestic airport, located in Sindh, Pakistan

== Others ==
- Sawan Airlines, was an airline company that provided flights between Iraq's cities Erbil and Sulaimaniyah and some cities in Europe
- "Sawan", a song by Malini Awasthi from the 2015 Indian film Jaanisaar

== See also ==
- Savan (disambiguation)
- Nakhon Sawan (disambiguation)
- Nakhon Sawan, a city (thesaban nakhon) in Thailand
- Nakhon Sawan Province, Thailand
- Na Sawan, a sub-district (tambon) in Mueang Bueng Kan District, in Bueng Kan Province, northeastern Thailand
- Tell es-Sawwan, an important Samarran period archaeological site in Saladin Province, Iraq.
