= Melkari-ye Sharqi Rural District =

Rural district in West Azerbaijan province, Iran

Melkari-ye Sharqi Rural District Persian: دهستان ملکاری شرقی
- Rural District
- Location within Iran
- Coordinates: 36°22′N 45°30′E
- Country: Iran
- Province: West Azerbaijan
- County: Mirabad
- District: Zab
- Established: 2022
- Capital: Nuaveh
- Time zone: UTC+3:30 (IRST)

Melkari-ye Sharqi Rural District (Persian: دهستان ملکاری شرقی) is in Zab District of Mirabad County, West Azerbaijan province, Iran. Its capital is the village of Nuaveh, whose population at the time of the 2016 National Census was 299 in 72 households.

== History ==
In 2022, Vazineh District (Note: Renamed the Central District of Mirabad County) was separated from Sardasht County in the establishment of Mirabad County and renamed the Central District. Melkari-ye Sharqi Rural District was created in the new Zab District.

== Other villages in the rural district ==
- Bariteh
- Chowalan
- Dashti
- Digeh
- Dowlahtu
- Gakowzheh-ye Olya
- Gakowzheh-ye Sofla
- Garzhal-e Sofla
- Goman
- Hasanabad
- Jangeh
- Kachalabad
- Kani Aspan
- Naluseh
- Neysakabad
- Parastan
- Pashbard
- Sarmargan-e Nalin
- Shalman
- Shivavakan
- Shivehju
- Suneh
- Ziveh
