= Kachleh, Kurdistan =

Kachleh كچله
- Village
- Location within Iran
- Coordinates: 34°56′33″N 46°58′18″E
- Country: Iran
- Province: Kurdistan
- County: Kamyaran
- Bakhsh: Muchesh
- Rural District: Sursur

Population (2006)
  - Total: 171
- Time zone: UTC+3:30 (IRST)
  - Summer (DST): UTC+4:30 (IRDT)

Kachleh (Persian: كچله; also known as Gachleh) is a village in Sursur Rural District, Muchesh District, Kamyaran County, Kurdistan Province, Iran. At the 2006 census, its population was 171, in 46 families. The village is populated by Kurds.
