= Savan Rural District =

Rural district in West Azerbaijan province, Iran

Savan Rural District Persian: دهستان ساوان
- Rural District
- Location within Iran
- Coordinates: 36°21′N 45°19′E
- Country: Iran
- Province: West Azerbaijan
- County: Mirabad
- District: Central
- Established: 2022
- Capital: Mazraeh
- Time zone: UTC+3:30 (IRST)

Savan Rural District (Persian: دهستان ساوان) is in the Central District (Note: Formerly Vazineh District of Sardasht County) of Mirabad County, West Azerbaijan province, Iran. Its capital is the village of Mazraeh, whose population at the time of the 2016 National Census was 523 in 153 households.

== History ==
In 2022, Vazineh District (Note: Renamed the Central District of Mirabad County) was separated from Sardasht County in the establishment of Mirabad County and renamed the Central District. Savan Rural District was created in the same district.

== Other villages in the rural district ==
- Almaran
- Alvatan
- Darmagun Bash-e Bala
- Darmagun Bash-e Qobran
- Davudabad
- Dowlahtu
- Dowli Khanvan
- Golkanak
- Gureh Shar
- Kani Zard
- Kavlaneh
- Mamakavah
- Nowkan
- Savan
- Savan-e Jadid
- Sepidareh-ye Darmeh
- Sireh Marg
