= Kachalabad, Kermanshah =

Kachalabad كچل اباد
- Village
- Location within Iran
- Coordinates: 34°43′05″N 46°16′29″E
- Country: Iran
- Province: Kermanshah
- County: Salas-e Babajani
- Bakhsh: Central
- Rural District: Zamkan

Population (2006)
  - Total: 138
- Time zone: UTC+3:30 (IRST)
  - Summer (DST): UTC+4:30 (IRDT)

Kachalabad (Persian: كچل اباد, also Romanized as Kachalābād) is a village in Zamkan Rural District, in the Central District of Salas-e Babajani County, Kermanshah Province, Iran. At the 2006 census, its population was 138, in 25 families.
