= Nakhon Sawan (disambiguation) =

Nakhon Sawan can refer to

- the town Nakhon Sawan, Thailand
- Nakhon Sawan Province, Thailand
- Nakhon Sawan district
- the Roman Catholic Diocese of Nakhon Sawan
- Monthon Nakhon Sawan, a former administrative entity
