= Degeh, Sardasht =

Degeh دگه
- Village
- Location within Iran
- Coordinates: 36°01′04″N 45°25′48″E
- Country: Iran
- Province: West Azerbaijan
- County: Sardasht
- Bakhsh: Central
- Rural District: Alan

Population (2006)
  - Total: 24
- Time zone: UTC+3:30 (IRST)
  - Summer (DST): UTC+4:30 (IRDT)

Degeh (Persian: دگه; also known as Dakeh) is a village in Alan Rural District, in the Central District of Sardasht County, West Azerbaijan Province, Iran. At the 2006 census, its population was 24, in 5 families.
