= Mirabad, West Azerbaijan =

City in West Azerbaijan province, Iran

Mirabad Persian: ميرآباد
- City
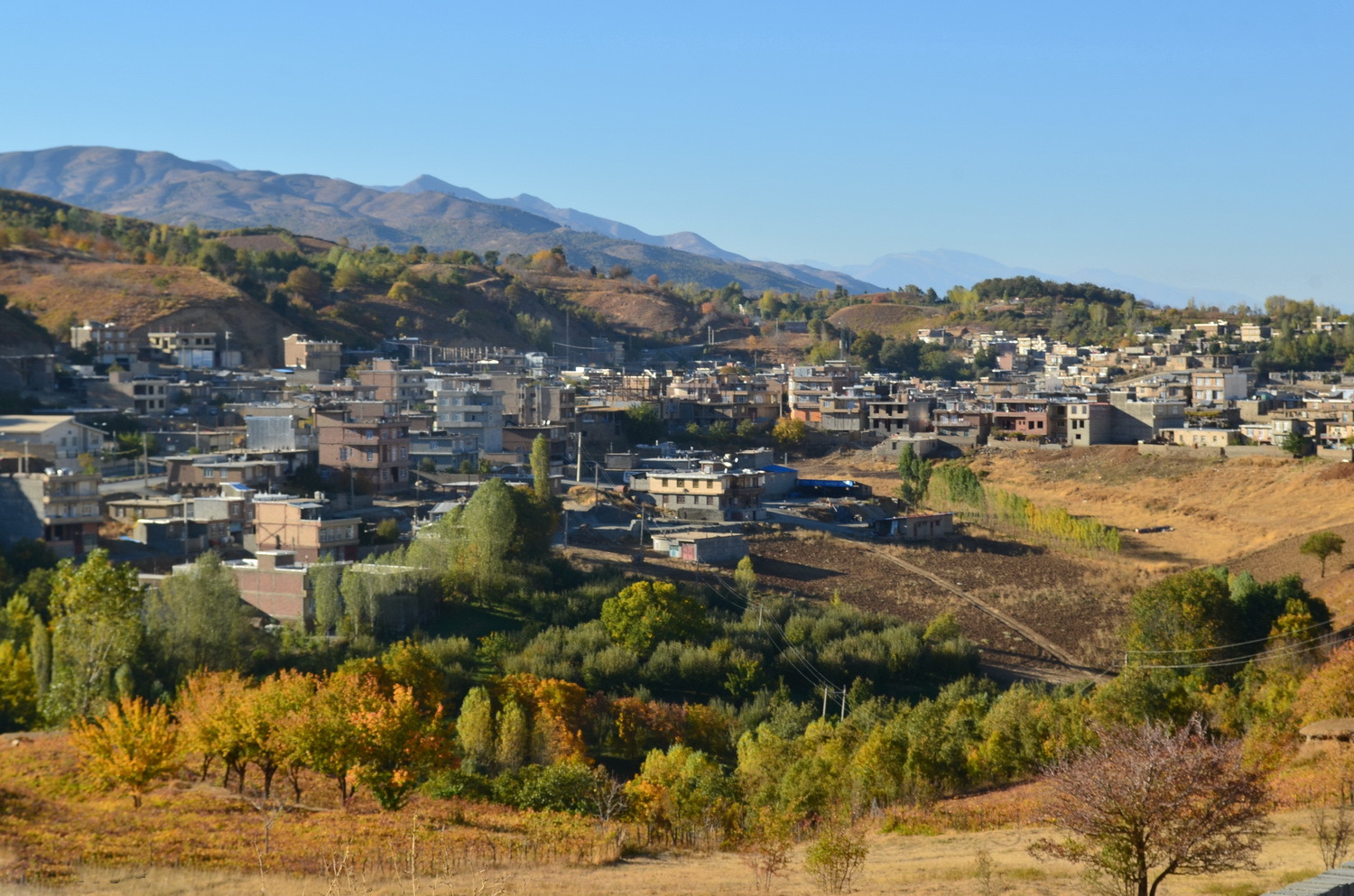

- Location within Iran
- Coordinates: 36°24′20″N 45°22′17″E
- Country: Iran
- Province: West Azerbaijan
- County: Mirabad
- District: Central
- Established as a city: 2000
- Elevation: 1,470 m (4,820 ft)

Population (2016)
  - Total: 6,000
- Time zone: UTC+3:30 (IRST)
- Area code: 0444335

Mirabad (Persian: ميرآباد) (Note: Also romanized as Mīrābād) is a city in the Central District (Note: Formerly Vazineh District of Sardasht County) of Mirabad County, West Azerbaijan province, Iran, serving as capital of both the county and the district. As a village, it was the capital of Gavork-e Nalin Rural District until its capital was transferred to the village of Musalan. The village of Mirabad was converted to a city in 2000.

== Demographics ==
=== Population ===
At the time of the 2006 National Census, the city's population was 4,502 in 820 households, when it was in Vazineh District (Note: Renamed the Central District of Mirabad County) of Sardasht County. The following census in 2011 counted 5,430 people in 1,238 households. The 2016 census measured the population of the city as 6,000 people in 1,550 households.

In 2022, the district was separated from the county in the establishment of Mirabad County and renamed the Central District, with Mirabad as the new county's capital.
