= Kachaleh, West Azerbaijan =

Kachaleh كچله
- Village
- Location within Iran
- Coordinates: 37°12′09″N 44°52′26″E
- Country: Iran
- Province: West Azerbaijan
- County: Urmia
- Bakhsh: Silvaneh
- Rural District: Margavar

Population (2006)
  - Total: 483
- Time zone: UTC+3:30 (IRST)
  - Summer (DST): UTC+4:30 (IRDT)

Kachaleh (Persian: كچله, also Romanized as Kachaleh; also known as Kachalābād) is a village in Margavar Rural District, Silvaneh District, Urmia County, West Azerbaijan Province, Iran. At the 2006 census, its population consisted of 483 people, in 100 families.
