= Melkari-ye Gharbi Rural District =

Rural district in West Azerbaijan province, Iran

Melkari-ye Gharbi Rural District Persian: دهستان ملکاری غربی
- Rural District
- Location within Iran
- Coordinates: 36°16′04″N 45°25′49″E
- Country: Iran
- Province: West Azerbaijan
- County: Mirabad
- District: Zab
- Capital: Aghlan

Population (2016)
  - Total: 16,301
- Time zone: UTC+3:30 (IRST)

Melkari-ye Gharbi Rural District (Persian: دهستان ملکاری غربی) (Note: Formerly Melkari Rural District (دهستان ملکاری)) is in Zab District of Mirabad County, West Azerbaijan province, Iran. Its capital is the village of Aghlan. The previous capital of the rural district was the village of Nalas, now a city.

== Demographics ==
=== Population ===
At the time of the 2006 National Census, the rural district's population (as Melkari Rural District (Note: Renamed Melkari-ye Gharbi Rural District) of Vazineh District (Note: Renamed the Central District of Mirabad County) in Sardasht County) was 16,185 in 2,841 households. There were 15,545 inhabitants in 4,045 households at the following census of 2011. The 2016 census measured the population of the rural district as 16,301 in 4,045 households. The most populous of its 62 villages was Nalas (now a city), with 8,503 people.

In 2022, the district was separated from the county in the establishment of Mirabad County and renamed the Central District. The rural district was transferred to the new Zab District and renamed Melkari-ye Gharbi Rural District.

=== Other villages in the rural district ===
- Ahmad Baryu
- Divalan
- Halveh
- Kazheh
- Mam Zineh
- Tuzhal
- Ziveh
