= Gavork-e Nalin Rural District =

Rural district in West Azerbaijan province, Iran

Gavork-e Nalin Rural District Persian: دهستان گورك نعلين
- Rural District
- Location within Iran
- Coordinates: 36°24′N 45°24′E
- Country: Iran
- Province: West Azerbaijan
- County: Mirabad
- District: Central
- Established: 1987
- Capital: Musalan

Population (2016)
  - Total: 9,958
- Time zone: UTC+3:30 (IRST)

Gavork-e Nalin Rural District (Persian: دهستان گورك نعلين) is in the Central District (Note: Formerly Vazineh District of Sardasht County) of Mirabad County, West Azerbaijan province, Iran. Its capital is the village of Musalan. The previous capital of the rural district was the village of Mirabad, now a city.

== Demographics ==
=== Population ===
At the time of the 2006 National Census, the rural district's population (as a part of Vazineh District (Note: Renamed the Central District of Mirabad County) in Sardasht County) was 10,682 in 1,682 households. There were 10,065 inhabitants in 2,017 households at the following census of 2011. The 2016 census measured the population of the rural district as 9,958 in 2,490 households. The most populous of its 51 villages was Savan-e Jadid (now in Savan Rural District of Zab District), with 1,002 people.

In 2022, the district was separated from the county in the establishment of Mirabad County and renamed the Central District.

=== Other villages in the rural district ===
- Chaku
- Eshkhal
- Gozileh
- Nabiabad
- Nivazh
- Shiveh Mer
- Si Pakan
