= Zab District =

District in West Azerbaijan province, Iran

Zab District Persian: بخش زاب
- District
- Location within Iran
- Coordinates: 36°19′N 45°29′E
- Country: Iran
- Province: West Azerbaijan
- County: Mirabad
- Established: 2022
- Capital: Vavan
- Time zone: UTC+3:30 (IRST)

Zab District (Persian: بخش زاب) is in Mirabad County of West Azerbaijan province, Iran. Its capital is the village of Vavan, whose population at the time of the 2016 National Census was 792 people in 195 households.

== History ==
In 2022, Vazineh District (Note: Renamed the Central District of Mirabad County) was separated from Sardasht County in the establishment of Mirabad County and renamed the Central District. The new county was divided into two districts of two rural districts each, with Mirabad as its capital and only city at the time.

== Demographics ==
=== Administrative divisions ===
Zab District
Administrative Divisions
Melkari-ye Gharbi RD (Note: Formerly Melkari Rural District)
Melkari-ye Sharqi RD
RD = Rural District
