= Mirabad County =

County in West Azerbaijan province, Iran

Mirabad County Persian: شهرستان میرآباد
- County
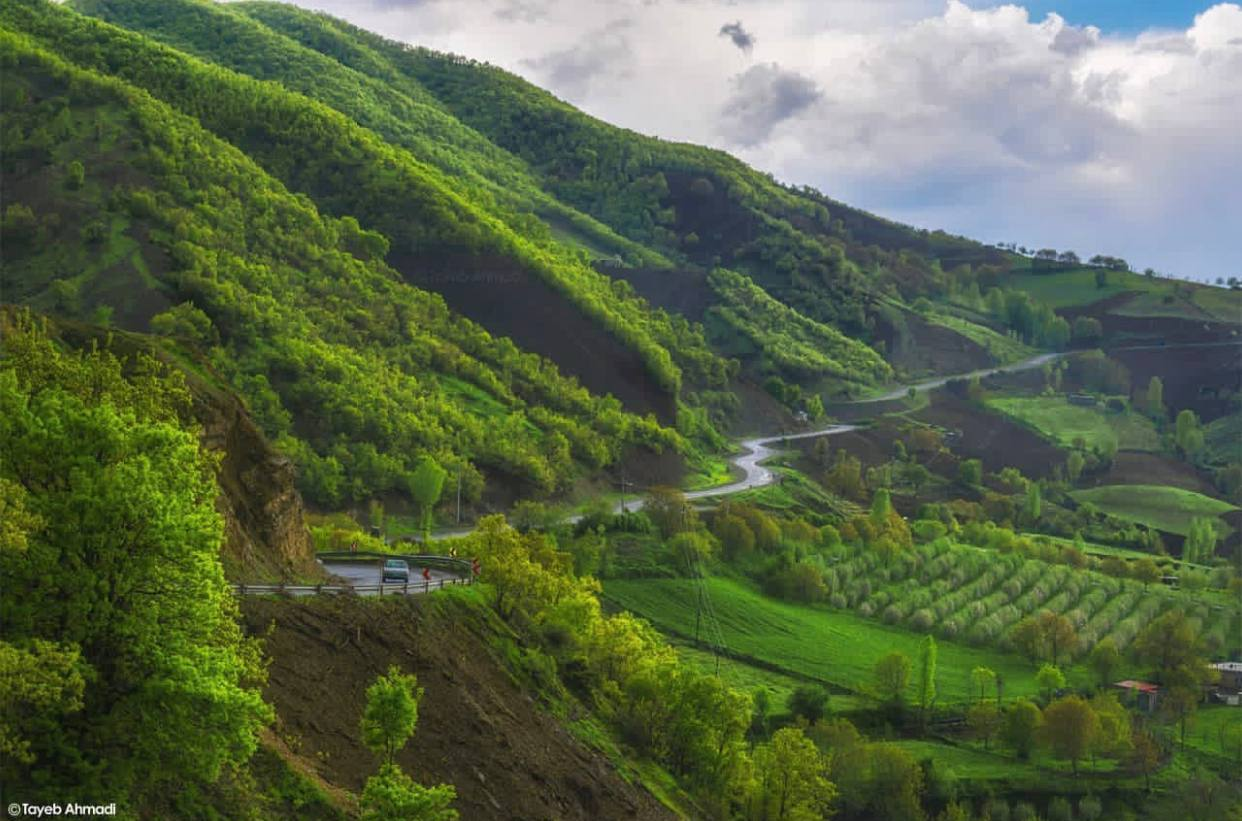
- Forested landscape in Mirabad County

- Location of Mirabad County in West Azerbaijan province (lower left, pink)

- Location of West Azerbaijan province in Iran
- Coordinates: 36°21′N 45°25′E
- Country: Iran
- Province: West Azerbaijan
- Established: 2022
- Capital: Mirabad
- Districts: Central, Zab
- Time zone: UTC+3:30 (IRST)

Mirabad County (Persian: شهرستان میرآباد) is in West Azerbaijan province, Iran. Its capital is the city of Mirabad, whose population at the time of the 2016 National Census was 6,000 people in 1,550 households.

== History ==
In 2022, Vazineh District (Note: Renamed the Central District of Mirabad County) was separated from Sardasht County in the establishment of Mirabad County and renamed the Central District. The new county was divided into two districts of two rural districts each, with Mirabad as its capital and only city at the time.

== Demographics ==
=== Administrative divisions ===
Mirabad County's administrative structure is shown in the following table.

Mirabad County
Administrative Divisions
Central District (Note: Formerly Vazineh District of Sardasht County)
Gavork-e Nalin RD
Savan RD
Mirabad (city)
Zab District
Melkari-ye Gharbi RD (Note: Formerly Melkari Rural District)
Melkari-ye Sharqi RD
RD = Rural District

== See also ==
Media related to Mirabad County at Wikimedia Commons
