= Central District (Mirabad County) =

District in West Azerbaijan province, Iran

Central District (Mirabad County) Persian: بخش مرکزی شهرستان میرآباد
- District
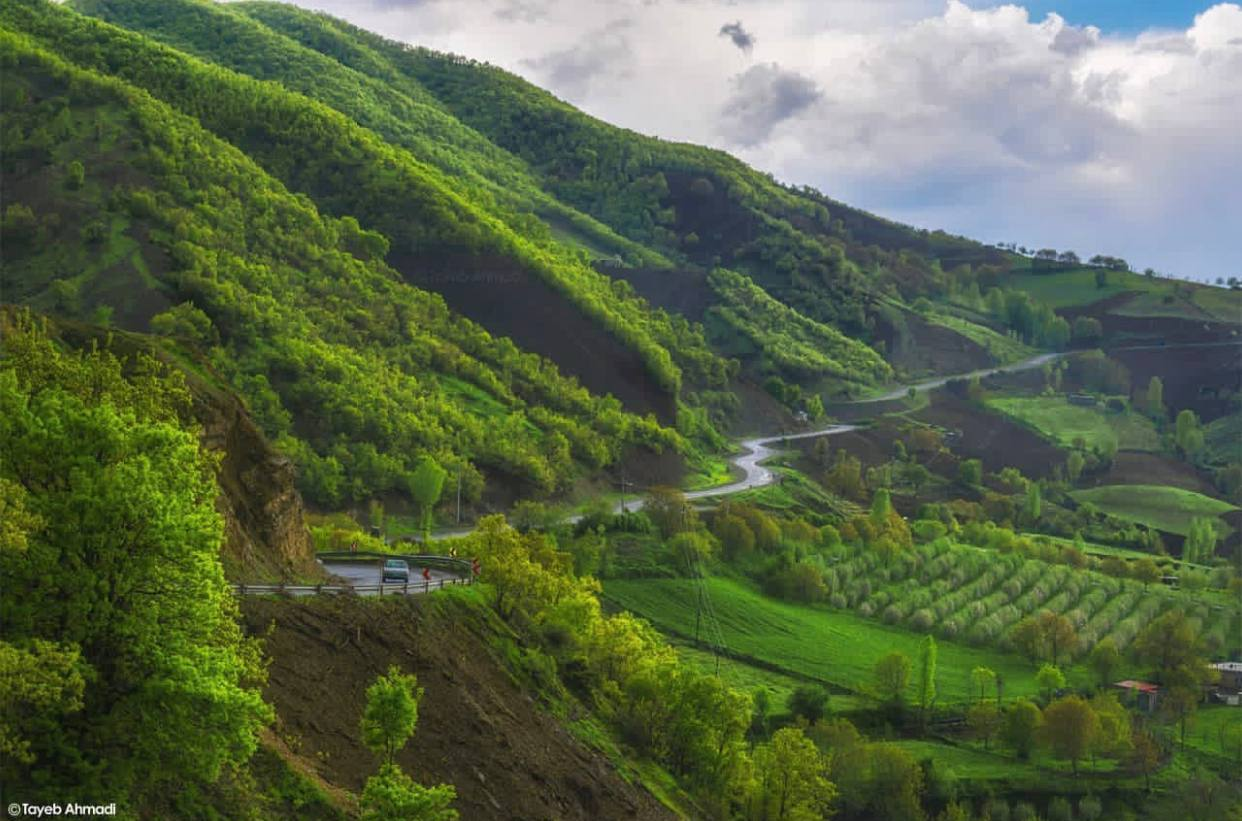

- Location within Iran
- Coordinates: 36°22′N 45°21′E
- Country: Iran
- Province: West Azerbaijan
- County: Mirabad
- Established: 1995
- Capital: Mirabad

Population (2016)
  - Total: 32,259 (Note: As Vazineh District of Sardasht County)
- Time zone: UTC+3:30 (IRST)

The Central District of Mirabad County (Persian: بخش مرکزی شهرستان میرآباد) (Note: Formerly Vazineh District (بخش وزینه) of Sardasht County) is in West Azerbaijan province, Iran. Its capital is the city of Mirabad.

In 2022, Vazineh District (Note: Renamed the Central District of Mirabad County) was separated from Sardasht County in the establishment of Mirabad County and renamed the Central District. The new county was divided into two districts of two rural districts each, with Mirabad as its capital and only city at the time.

== Demographics ==
=== Population ===
At the time of the 2006 National Census, the district's population (as Vazineh District of Sardasht County) was 31,369 in 5,343 households. The following census in 2011 counted 31,040 people in 6,825 households. The 2016 census measured the population of the district as 32,259 inhabitants in 8,085 households.

=== Administrative divisions ===
Central District (Mirabad County) (Note: As Vazineh District of Sardasht County at the 2006, 2011, and 2016 censuses)
Administrative Divisions	2006	2011	2016
Gavork-e Nalin RD	10,682	10,065	9,958
Melkari-ye Gharbi RD (Note: Formerly Melkari Rural District, transferred to Zab District after the 2016 census)	16,185	15,545	16,301
Savan RD (Note: Established after the 2016 census)			
Mirabad (city)	4,502	5,430	6,000
Total	31,369	31,040	32,259
RD = Rural District
