= Benavileh =

Benavileh or Banaveylah or Benaveyleh (Persian: بناويله) may refer to:

- Benavileh-ye Kohneh, Kurdistan Province
- Banaveylah-e Hajji Mineh, West Azerbaijan Province
- Benavileh-ye Bozorg, West Azerbaijan Province
- Benavileh-ye Kuchak, West Azerbaijan Province
