= Duleh =

Duleh or Dowleh (Persian: دوله), also rendered as Doleh, may refer to:

- Dowleh, Kermanshah
- Doleh Yaraleh, Khuzestan Province
- Duleh, Razavi Khorasan
- Duleh, West Azerbaijan
- Duleh-ye Garm, West Azerbaijan Province
- Duleh, Zanjan
