= Darmarjan =

Darmarjan دارمرجان
- Village
- Location within Iran
- Coordinates: 36°08′00″N 45°31′38″E
- Country: Iran
- Province: West Azerbaijan
- County: Sardasht
- Bakhsh: Central
- Rural District: Bask-e Kuleseh

Population (2006)
  - Total: 39
- Time zone: UTC+3:30 (IRST)
  - Summer (DST): UTC+4:30 (IRDT)

Darmarjan (Persian: دارمرجان, also Romanized as Dārmarjān) is a village in Bask-e Kuleseh Rural District, in the Central District of Sardasht County, West Azerbaijan Province, Iran. At the 2006 census, its population was 39, in 7 families.
