= Sirveh =

Village in West Azerbaijan province, Iran

Sirveh Persian: سيروه
- Village
- Location within Iran
- Coordinates: 36°15′27″N 45°35′30″E
- Country: Iran
- Province: West Azerbaijan
- County: Sardasht
- District: Rabat
- Rural District: Gavork-e Sardasht

Population (2016)
  - Total: 235
- Time zone: UTC+3:30 (IRST)

Soviru (Persian: سويرو, also Romanized as Sovīrū)

Sirveh (Persian: سيروه) (Note: Also romanized as Sīrveh; formerly known as Soviru (سويرو), also romanized as Sovīrū) is a village in Gavork-e Sardasht Rural District of Rabat District in Sardasht County, West Azerbaijan province, Iran.

== Demographics ==
=== Population ===
At the time of the 2006 National Census, the village's population, as Soviru, was 284 in 87 households, when it was in the Central District. The following census in 2011 counted 249 people in 69 households, by which time the village was listed as Sirveh. The 2016 census measured the population of the village as 235 people in 67 households.

In 2020, the rural district was separated from the district in the formation of Rabat District.
