= Nashgulan =

Nashgulan نشگولان
- Village
- Location within Iran
- Coordinates: 36°09′45″N 45°25′11″E
- Country: Iran
- Province: West Azerbaijan
- County: Sardasht
- Bakhsh: Central
- Rural District: Baryaji

Population (2006)
  - Total: 141
- Time zone: UTC+3:30 (IRST)
  - Summer (DST): UTC+4:30 (IRDT)

Nashgulan (Persian: نشگولان, also Romanized as Nashgūlān; also known as Nashkalān) is a village in Baryaji Rural District, in the Central District of Sardasht County, West Azerbaijan Province, Iran. At the 2006 census, its population was 141, in 24 families.
