= Shalehsiv =

Shalehsiv شله سيو
- Village
- Location within Iran
- Coordinates: 36°06′35″N 45°27′19″E
- Country: Iran
- Province: West Azerbaijan
- County: Sardasht
- Bakhsh: Central
- Rural District: Baryaji

Population (2006)
  - Total: 16
- Time zone: UTC+3:30 (IRST)
  - Summer (DST): UTC+4:30 (IRDT)

Shalehsiv (Persian: شله سيو, also Romanized as Shalehsīv; also known as Shalehsīt) is a village in Baryaji Rural District, in the Central District of Sardasht County, West Azerbaijan Province, Iran. At the 2006 census, its population was 16, in 5 families.
