= Vashmazin =

Vashmazin واشمزين
- Village
- Location within Iran
- Coordinates: 36°12′18″N 45°23′55″E
- Country: Iran
- Province: West Azerbaijan
- County: Sardasht
- Bakhsh: Central
- Rural District: Baryaji

Population (2006)
  - Total: 82
- Time zone: UTC+3:30 (IRST)
  - Summer (DST): UTC+4:30 (IRDT)

Vashmazin (Persian: واشمزين, also Romanized as Vāshmazīn) is a village in Baryaji Rural District, in the Central District of Sardasht County, West Azerbaijan Province, Iran. At the 2006 census, its population was 82, in 17 families.
