= Kohneh Zuran =

Kohneh Zuran كهنه زوران
- Village
- Location within Iran
- Coordinates: 36°11′18″N 45°23′16″E
- Country: Iran
- Province: West Azerbaijan
- County: Sardasht
- Bakhsh: Central
- Rural District: Baryaji

Population (2006)
  - Total: 27
- Time zone: UTC+3:30 (IRST)
  - Summer (DST): UTC+4:30 (IRDT)

Kohneh Zuran (Persian: كهنه زوران, also Romanized as Kohneh Zūrān) is a village in Baryaji Rural District, in the Central District of Sardasht County, West Azerbaijan Province, Iran. At the 2006 census, its population was 27, in 4 families.
