= Bagh, West Azerbaijan =

Village in West Azerbaijan province, Iran

Bagh Persian: باغ
- Village
- Location within Iran
- Coordinates: 36°10′03″N 45°30′46″E
- Country: Iran
- Province: West Azerbaijan
- County: Sardasht
- District: Rabat
- Rural District: Bask-e Kuleseh

Population (2016)
  - Total: 300
- Time zone: UTC+3:30 (IRST)

Bagh (Persian: باغ) (Note: Also romanized as Bāgh) is a village in Bask-e Kuleseh Rural District of Rabat District in Sardasht County, West Azerbaijan province, Iran.

== Demographics ==
=== Population ===
At the time of the 2006 National Census, the village's population was 306 in 52 households, when it was in the Central District. The following census in 2011 counted 300 people in 61 households. The 2016 census measured the population of the village as 300 people in 83 households.

In 2020, the rural district was separated from the district in the formation of Rabat District.
