= Yasinabad =

Yasinabad ياسين آباد
- Village
- Location within Iran
- Coordinates: 36°07′06″N 45°32′58″E
- Country: Iran
- Province: West Azerbaijan
- County: Sardasht
- Bakhsh: Central
- Rural District: Bask-e Kuleseh

Population (2006)
  - Total: 116
- Time zone: UTC+3:30 (IRST)
  - Summer (DST): UTC+4:30 (IRDT)

Yasinabad (Persian: ياسين آباد, also Romanized as Yāsīnābād) is a village in Bask-e Kuleseh Rural District, in the Central District of Sardasht County, West Azerbaijan Province, Iran. At the 2006 census, its population was 116, in 23 families.
