= Margaseh =

Margaseh مرگاسه
- Village
- Location within Iran
- Coordinates: 36°03′18″N 45°24′39″E
- Country: Iran
- Province: West Azerbaijan
- County: Sardasht
- Bakhsh: Central
- Rural District: Alan

Population (2006)
  - Total: 107
- Time zone: UTC+3:30 (IRST)
  - Summer (DST): UTC+4:30 (IRDT)

Margaseh (Persian: مرگاسه, also Romanized as Margāseh; also known as Margāseh-ye Bālā) is a village in Alan Rural District, in the Central District of Sardasht County, West Azerbaijan Province, Iran. At the 2006 census, its population was 107, in 24 families.
