= Bezileh =

Village in West Azerbaijan province, Iran

Bezileh Persian: بزيله
- Village
- Location within Iran
- Coordinates: 36°10′45″N 45°30′08″E
- Country: Iran
- Province: West Azerbaijan
- County: Sardasht
- District: Rabat
- Rural District: Gavork-e Sardasht

Population (2016)
  - Total: 139
- Time zone: UTC+3:30 (IRST)

Bezileh (Persian: بزيله) (Note: Also romanized as Bezīleh) is a village in Gavork-e Sardasht Rural District of Rabat District in Sardasht County, West Azerbaijan province, Iran.

== Demographics ==
=== Population ===
At the time of the 2006 National Census, the village's population was 118 in 24 households, when it was in Melkari Rural District (Note: Renamed Melkari-ye Gharbi Rural District) of Vazineh District. (Note: Renamed the Central District of Mirabad County) The following census in 2011 counted 110 people in 26 households. The 2016 census measured the population of the village as 139 people in 37 households.

In 2020, Gavork-e Sardasht Rural District was separated from the Central District in the formation of Rabat District and Bezileh was transferred to the rural district. In 2022, Vazineh District was separated from the county in the establishment of Mirabad County and renamed the Central District. Melkari Rural District was transferred to the new Zab District and renamed Melkari-ye Gharbi Rural District.
