= Shalmash =

Village in West Azerbaijan province, Iran

Shalmash Persian: شلماش
- Village
- Location within Iran
- Coordinates: 36°05′03″N 45°30′04″E
- Country: Iran
- Province: West Azerbaijan
- County: Sardasht
- District: Rabat
- Rural District: Bask-e Kuleseh

Population (2016)
  - Total: 201
- Time zone: UTC+3:30 (IRST)

Shalmash (Persian: شلماش) (Note: Also romanized as Shalmāsh) is a village in Bask-e Kuleseh Rural District of Rabat District in Sardasht County, West Azerbaijan province, Iran.

== Demographics ==
=== Population ===
At the time of the 2006 National Census, the village's population was 457 in 79 households, when it was in the Central District. The following census in 2011 counted 360 people in 90 households. The 2016 census measured the population of the village as 201 people in 57 households.

In 2020, the rural district was separated from the district in the formation of Rabat District.
