= Leylaneh =

Village in West Azerbaijan province, Iran

Leylaneh Persian: ليلانه
- Village
- Location within Iran
- Coordinates: 36°12′07″N 45°34′46″E
- Country: Iran
- Province: West Azerbaijan
- County: Sardasht
- District: Rabat
- Rural District: Gavork-e Sardasht

Population (2016)
  - Total: 269
- Time zone: UTC+3:30 (IRST)

Leylaneh (Persian: ليلانه) (Note: Also romanized as Leylāneh and Līlaneh; also known as Laylāneh) is a village in Gavork-e Sardasht Rural District of Rabat District in Sardasht County, West Azerbaijan province, Iran.

== Demographics ==
=== Population ===
At the time of the 2006 National Census, the village's population was 428 in 67 households, when it was in the Central District. The following census in 2011 counted 312 people in 67 households. The 2016 census measured the population of the village as 269 people in 56 households.

In 2020, the rural district was separated from the district in the formation of Rabat District.
