= Qulteh =

Qulteh قولته
- Village
- Location within Iran
- Coordinates: 36°09′51″N 45°31′24″E
- Country: Iran
- Province: West Azerbaijan
- County: Sardasht
- Bakhsh: Central
- Rural District: Bask-e Kuleseh

Population (2006)
  - Total: 271
- Time zone: UTC+3:30 (IRST)
  - Summer (DST): UTC+4:30 (IRDT)

Qulteh (Persian: قولته, also Romanized as Qūlteh; also known as Qalteh) is a village in Bask-e Kuleseh Rural District, in the Central District of Sardasht County, West Azerbaijan Province, Iran. At the 2006 census, its population was 271, in 51 families.
