= Yusef Goli =

Village in West Azerbaijan province, Iran

Yusef Goli Persian: يوسف گلي
- Village
- Location within Iran
- Coordinates: 36°07′00″N 45°35′24″E
- Country: Iran
- Province: West Azerbaijan
- County: Sardasht
- District: Rabat
- Rural District: Bask-e Kuleseh

Population (2016)
  - Total: 202
- Time zone: UTC+3:30 (IRST)

Yusef Golf (Persian: يوسف گلي (Note: Also tomanized as Yūsef Golī; formerly known as Yusef Gol (يوسف گل), also romanized as Yūsef Gol and Yūsof Gol) is a village in Bask-e Kuleseh Rural District of Rabat District in Sardasht County, West Azerbaijan province, Iran.

== Demographics ==
=== Population ===
At the time of the 2006 National Census, the village's population, as Yusef Gol, was 275 in 49 households, when it was in the Central District. The following census in 2011 counted 212 people in 44 households, by which time the village was listed as Yusef Goli. The 2016 census measured the population of the village as 202 people in 48 households.

In 2020, the rural district was separated from the district in the formation of Rabat District.
