= Shalgeh =

Shalgeh شالگه
- Village
- Location within Iran
- Coordinates: 36°11′17″N 45°35′48″E
- Country: Iran
- Province: West Azerbaijan
- County: Sardasht
- Bakhsh: Central
- Rural District: Gavork-e Sardasht

Population (2006)
  - Total: 71
- Time zone: UTC+3:30 (IRST)
  - Summer (DST): UTC+4:30 (IRDT)

Shalgeh (Persian: شالگه, also Romanized as Shālgeh) is a village in Gavork-e Sardasht Rural District, in the Central District of Sardasht County, West Azerbaijan Province, Iran. At the 2006 census, its population was 71, in 10 families.
