= Bardeh Sepian =

Bardeh Sepian برده سپيان
- Village
- Location within Iran
- Coordinates: 36°07′49″N 45°26′36″E
- Country: Iran
- Province: West Azerbaijan
- County: Sardasht
- Bakhsh: Central
- Rural District: Baryaji

Population (2006)
  - Total: 45
- Time zone: UTC+3:30 (IRST)
  - Summer (DST): UTC+4:30 (IRDT)

Bardeh Sepian (Persian: برده سپيان, also Romanized as Bardeh Sepīān; also known as Bardaspīān) is a village in Baryaji Rural District, in the Central District of Sardasht County, West Azerbaijan Province, Iran. According to the 2006 census, its population was 45 people from 11 families.
