= Berisu =

Village in West Azerbaijan province, Iran

Berisu Persian: بريسو
- Village
- Location within Iran
- Coordinates: 36°09′03″N 45°32′34″E
- Country: Iran
- Province: West Azerbaijan
- County: Sardasht
- District: Rabat
- Rural District: Bask-e Kuleseh

Population (2016)
  - Total: 194
- Time zone: UTC+3:30 (IRST)
  - Summer (DST): UTC+4:30 (IRDT)

Berisu (Persian: بريسو) (Note: Also romanized as Berīsū) is a village in, and the capital of, Bask-e Kuleseh Rural District in Rabat District of Sardasht County, West Azerbaijan province, Iran.

== Demographics ==
=== Population ===
At the time of the 2006 National Census, the village's population was 367 in 61 households, when it was in the Central District. The following census in 2011 counted 372 people in 84 households. The 2016 census measured the population of the village as 194 people in 55 households.

In 2020, the rural district was separated from the district in the formation of Rabat District.
