= Sartakeh =

Village in West Azerbaijan province, Iran

Sartakeh Persian: سارتكه
- Village
- Location within Iran
- Coordinates: 36°17′46″N 45°34′23″E
- Country: Iran
- Province: West Azerbaijan
- County: Sardasht
- District: Rabat
- Rural District: Gavork-e Sardasht

Population (2016)
  - Total: 141
- Time zone: UTC+3:30 (IRST)

Sartakeh (Persian: سارتكه) (Note: Also romanized as Sār Tekeh and Sārtakeh) is a village in Gavork-e Sardasht Rural District of Rabat District in Sardasht County, West Azerbaijan province, Iran.

== Demographics ==
=== Population ===
At the time of the 2006 National Census, the village's population was 304 in 47 households, when it was in the Central District. The following census in 2011 counted 208 people in 53 households. The 2016 census measured the population of the village as 141 people in 34 households.

In 2020, the rural district was separated from the district in the formation of Rabat District.
