= Zhazhukeh =

Zhazhukeh ژاژوكه
- Village
- Location within Iran
- Coordinates: 36°08′51″N 45°27′18″E
- Country: Iran
- Province: West Azerbaijan
- County: Sardasht
- Bakhsh: Central
- Rural District: Baryaji

Population (2006)
  - Total: 159
- Time zone: UTC+3:30 (IRST)
  - Summer (DST): UTC+4:30 (IRDT)

Zhazhukeh (Persian: ژاژوكه, also Romanized as Zhāzhūkeh) is a village in Baryaji Rural District, in the Central District of Sardasht County, West Azerbaijan Province, Iran. At the 2006 census, its population was 159, in 28 families.
