= Varchak =

Village in West Azerbaijan province, Iran

Varchak Persian: ورچك
- Village
- Location within Iran
- Coordinates: 36°04′21″N 45°32′56″E
- Country: Iran
- Province: West Azerbaijan
- County: Sardasht
- District: Rabat
- Rural District: Bask-e Kuleseh

Population (2016)
  - Total: 228
- Time zone: UTC+3:30 (IRST)

Varchak (Persian: ورچك) is a village in Bask-e Kuleseh Rural District of Rabat District in Sardasht County, West Azerbaijan province, Iran.

== Demographics ==
=== Population ===
At the time of the 2006 National Census, the village's population was 314 in 54 households, when it was in the Central District. The following census in 2011 counted 264 people in 58 households. The 2016 census measured the population of the village as 228 people in 35 households.

In 2020, the rural district was separated from the district in the formation of Rabat District.
