= Si Sar =

Village in West Azerbaijan province, Iran

Si Sar Persian: سي سر
- Village
- Location within Iran
- Coordinates: 36°14′46″N 45°37′00″E
- Country: Iran
- Province: West Azerbaijan
- County: Sardasht
- District: Rabat
- Rural District: Gavork-e Sardasht

Population (2016)
  - Total: 641
- Time zone: UTC+3:30 (IRST)

Si Sar (Persian: سي سر) (Note: Also romanized as Sī Sar and Sīser; also known as Seh Sīr and Sisir) is a village in, and the capital of, Gavork-e Sardasht Rural District in Rabat District of Sardasht County, West Azerbaijan province, Iran. The rural district was previously administered from the city of Rabat.

== Demographics ==
=== Population ===
At the time of the 2006 National Census, the village's population was 915 in 146 households, when it was in the Central District. The following census in 2011 counted 792 people in 204 households. The 2016 census measured the population of the village as 641 people in 148 households. It was the most populous village in its rural district.

In 2020, the rural district was separated from the district in the formation of Rabat District.
