= Guleh, Sardasht =

Village in West Azerbaijan province, Iran

Guleh Persian: گوله
- Village
- Location within Iran
- Coordinates: 36°13′13″N 45°38′27″E
- Country: Iran
- Province: West Azerbaijan
- County: Sardasht
- District: Rabat
- Rural District: Gavork-e Sardasht

Population (2016)
  - Total: 233
- Time zone: UTC+3:30 (IRST)

Guleh (Persian: گوله) (Note: Also romanized as Gūleh) is a village in Gavork-e Sardasht Rural District of Rabat District in Sardasht County, West Azerbaijan province, Iran.

== Demographics ==
=== Population ===
At the time of the 2006 National Census, the village's population was 364 in 61 households, when it was in the Central District. The following census in 2011 counted 289 people in 77 households. The 2016 census measured the population of the village as 233 people in 51 households.

In 2020, the rural district was separated from the district in the formation of Rabat District.
