= Faqer Khadariyan =

Faqer Khadariyan فقرخدريان
- Village
- Location within Iran
- Coordinates: 36°07′38″N 45°29′40″E
- Country: Iran
- Province: West Azerbaijan
- County: Sardasht
- Bakhsh: Central
- Rural District: Baryaji

Population (2006)
  - Total: 42
- Time zone: UTC+3:30 (IRST)
  - Summer (DST): UTC+4:30 (IRDT)

Faqer Khadariyan (Persian: فقرخدريان, also Romanized as Faqīr Khadarīyān; also known as Faqīyeh Khadarīyān and Faqīr Khadar) is a village in Baryaji Rural District, in the Central District of Sardasht County, West Azerbaijan Province, Iran. At the 2006 census, its population was 42, in 9 families.
