= Gel-e Espid =

Village in West Azerbaijan, Iran

Gel-e Espid گلاسپيد
- Village
- Location within Iran
- Coordinates: 36°01′43″N 45°33′01″E
- Country: Iran
- Province: West Azerbaijan
- County: Sardasht
- Bakhsh: Central
- Rural District: Alan

Population (2006)
  - Total: 49
- Time zone: UTC+3:30 (IRST)
  - Summer (DST): UTC+4:30 (IRDT)

Gel-e Espid (Persian: گلاسپيد, also Romanized as Gel-e Espīd; also known as Gelā Sefīd) is a village in Alan Rural District, in the Central District of Sardasht County, West Azerbaijan Province, Iran. In the 2006 census, it had a population of 49 people, each belonging to one of 7 the families in the village.
