= Sureh Chum =

Sureh Chum سوره چوم
- Village
- Location within Iran
- Coordinates: 36°06′39″N 45°25′07″E
- Country: Iran
- Province: West Azerbaijan
- County: Sardasht
- Bakhsh: Central
- Rural District: Baryaji

Population (2006)
  - Total: 123
- Time zone: UTC+3:30 (IRST)
  - Summer (DST): UTC+4:30 (IRDT)

Sureh Chum (Persian: سوره چوم, also Romanized as Sūreh Chūm; also known as Sūreh Cham) is a village in Baryaji Rural District, in the Central District of Sardasht County, West Azerbaijan Province, Iran. At the 2006 census, its population was 123, in 27 families.
