= Barveh =

Barveh بروه
- Village
- Location within Iran
- Coordinates: 36°14′27″N 45°31′31″E
- Country: Iran
- Province: West Azerbaijan
- County: Sardasht
- Bakhsh: Central
- Rural District: Gavork-e Sardasht

Population (2006)
  - Total: 26
- Time zone: UTC+3:30 (IRST)
  - Summer (DST): UTC+4:30 (IRDT)

Barveh (Persian: بروه) is a village in Gavork-e Sardasht Rural District, in the Central District of Sardasht County, West Azerbaijan Province, Iran. At the 2006 census, its population was 26, in 4 families.
