= Baltan =

Village in West Azerbaijan, Iran

Baltan بالتان
- Village
- Location within Iran
- Coordinates: 36°00′48″N 45°25′56″E
- Country: Iran
- Province: West Azerbaijan
- County: Sardasht
- Bakhsh: Central
- Rural District: Alan

Population (2006)
  - Total: 33
- Time zone: UTC+3:30 (IRST)
  - Summer (DST): UTC+4:30 (IRDT)

Baltan (Persian: بالتان, also Romanized as Bāltān) is a village in Alan Rural District, in the Central District of Sardasht County, West Azerbaijan Province, Iran. At the 2006 census, its population was 33, in seven families.
