= Mavlu =

Mavlu ماولو
- Village
- Location within Iran
- Coordinates: 36°13′34″N 45°34′19″E
- Country: Iran
- Province: West Azerbaijan
- County: Sardasht
- Bakhsh: Central
- Rural District: Gavork-e Sardasht

Population (2006)
  - Total: 96
- Time zone: UTC+3:30 (IRST)
  - Summer (DST): UTC+4:30 (IRDT)

Mavlu (Persian: ماولو, also Romanized as Māvlū) is a village in Gavork-e Sardasht Rural District, in the Central District of Sardasht County, West Azerbaijan Province, Iran. At the 2006 census, its population was 96, in 18 families.
