= Kani Guz =

Kani Guz كاني گوز
- Village
- Location within Iran
- Coordinates: 36°13′02″N 45°32′16″E
- Country: Iran
- Province: West Azerbaijan
- County: Sardasht
- Bakhsh: Central
- Rural District: Gavork-e Sardasht

Population (2006)
  - Total: 73
- Time zone: UTC+3:30 (IRST)
  - Summer (DST): UTC+4:30 (IRDT)

Kani Guz (Persian: كاني گوز, also Romanized as Kānī Gūz; also known as Kānī Jowz) is a village in Gavork-e Sardasht Rural District, in the Central District of Sardasht County, West Azerbaijan Province, Iran. At the 2006 census, its population was 73, in 14 families.
