= Hendabad =

Village in West Azerbaijan province, Iran

Hendabad Persian: هنداباد
- Village
- Location within Iran
- Coordinates: 36°10′57″N 45°34′46″E
- Country: Iran
- Province: West Azerbaijan
- County: Sardasht
- District: Rabat
- Rural District: Gavork-e Sardasht

Population (2016)
  - Total: 323
- Time zone: UTC+3:30 (IRST)

Hendabad (Persian: هنداباد) (Note: Also romanized as Hendābād) is a village in Gavork-e Sardasht Rural District of Rabat District in Sardasht County, West Azerbaijan province, Iran.

== Demographics ==
=== Population ===
At the time of the 2006 National Census, the village's population was 428 in 68 households, when it was in the Central District. The following census in 2011 counted 362 people in 82 households. The 2016 census measured the population of the village as 323 people in 64 households.

In 2020, the rural district was separated from the district in the formation of Rabat District.
