= Valiv =

Village in West Azerbaijan province, Iran

Valiv Persian: وليو
- Village
- Location within Iran
- Coordinates: 36°17′20″N 45°31′18″E
- Country: Iran
- Province: West Azerbaijan
- County: Sardasht
- District: Rabat
- Rural District: Gavork-e Sardasht

Population (2016)
  - Total: 177
- Time zone: UTC+3:30 (IRST)

Valiv (Persian: وليو) (Note: Also romanized as Vālīv) is a village in Gavork-e Sardasht Rural District of Rabat District in Sardasht County, West Azerbaijan province, Iran.

== Demographics ==
=== Population ===
At the time of the 2006 National Census, the village's population was 246 in 42 households, when it was in Melkari Rural District (Note: Renamed Melkari-ye Gharbi Rural District) of Vazineh District. (Note: Renamed the Central District of Mirabad County) The following census in 2011 counted 193 people in 44 households. The 2016 census measured the population of the village as 177 people in 45 households.

In 2020, Gavork-e Sardasht Rural District was separated from the Central District in the formation of Rabat District and Valiv was transferred to the rural district. In 2022, Vazineh District was separated from the county in the establishment of Mirabad County and renamed the Central District. Melkari Rural District was transferred to the new Zab District and renamed Melkari-ye Gharbi Rural District.
