= Ashkan-e Sofla =

Ashkan-e Sofla اشكان سفلي
- Village
- Location within Iran
- Coordinates: 36°01′11″N 45°21′48″E
- Country: Iran
- Province: West Azerbaijan
- County: Sardasht
- Bakhsh: Central
- Rural District: Alan

Population (2006)
  - Total: 19
- Time zone: UTC+3:30 (IRST)
  - Summer (DST): UTC+4:30 (IRDT)

Ashkan-e Sofla (Persian: اشكان سفلي, also Romanized as Ashkān-e Soflá; also known as Ashkān-e Pā'īn) is a village in Alan Rural District, in the Central District of Sardasht County, West Azerbaijan Province, Iran. At the 2006 census, its population was 19, in 5 families.
