= Rashkan =

Rashkan or Reshkan or Rashakan (Persian: رشكان) may refer to:

- Reshkan, Kerman
- Rashkan, Sistan and Baluchestan
- Rashkan, West Azerbaijan
- Rashkan-e Sofla, West Azerbaijan Province
- Rashkan castle, near Tehran

== See also ==
- Raskhan, Indian poet
