= Seh Vatal =

Seh Vatal سه وتال
- Village
- Location within Iran
- Coordinates: 36°06′02″N 45°25′33″E
- Country: Iran
- Province: West Azerbaijan
- County: Sardasht
- Bakhsh: Central
- Rural District: Baryaji

Population (2006)
  - Total: 179
- Time zone: UTC+3:30 (IRST)
  - Summer (DST): UTC+4:30 (IRDT)

Seh Vatal (Persian: سه وتال, also Romanized as Seh Vatāl) is a village in Baryaji Rural District, on the border of the Central District of Sardasht County, West Azerbaijan Province, Iran. At the 2006 census, its population was 179, in 42 families.
