= Banehzir =

Village in West Azerbaijan province, Iran

Banehzir Persian: بانه زير
- Village
- Location within Iran
- Coordinates: 36°06′32″N 45°38′00″E
- Country: Iran
- Province: West Azerbaijan
- County: Sardasht
- District: Rabat
- Rural District: Bask-e Kuleseh

Population (2016)
  - Total: 205
- Time zone: UTC+3:30 (IRST)

Banehzir (Persian: بانه زير) (Note: Also romanized as Bānehzīr) is a village in Bask-e Kuleseh Rural District of Rabat District in Sardasht County, West Azerbaijan province, Iran.

== Demographics ==
=== Population ===
At the time of the 2006 National Census, the village's population was 291 in 48 households, when it was in the Central District. The following census in 2011 counted 199 people in 48 households. The 2016 census measured the population of the village as 205 people in 51 households.

In 2020, the rural district was separated from the district in the formation of Rabat District.
