= Kavzhan =

Kavzhan كاوژان
- Village
- Location within Iran
- Coordinates: 36°00′58″N 45°28′54″E
- Country: Iran
- Province: West Azerbaijan
- County: Sardasht
- Bakhsh: Central
- Rural District: Alan

Population (2006)
  - Total: 62
- Time zone: UTC+3:30 (IRST)
  - Summer (DST): UTC+4:30 (IRDT)

Kavzhan (Persian: كاوژان, also Romanized as Kāvzhān) is a village in Alan Rural District, in the Central District of Sardasht County, West Azerbaijan Province, Iran. At the 2006 census, its population was 62, in 12 families.
