= Banaveh, Gavork-e Sardasht =

Village in West Azerbaijan province, Iran

Banaveh Persian: بناوه
- Village
- Location within Iran
- Coordinates: 36°13′27″N 45°30′07″E
- Country: Iran
- Province: West Azerbaijan
- County: Sardasht
- District: Rabat
- Rural District: Gavork-e Sardasht

Population (2016)
  - Total: 637
- Time zone: UTC+3:30 (IRST)

Banaveh (Persian: بناوه) (Note: Formerly known as Banabad (بناباد), also romanized as Banābād; also known as Banāābād) is a village in Gavork-e Sardasht Rural District of Rabat District in Sardasht County, West Azerbaijan province, Iran.

== Demographics ==
=== Population ===
At the time of the 2006 National Census, the village's population, as Banabad, was 609 in 117 households, when it was in Melkari Rural District (Note: Renamed Melkari-ye Gharbi Rural District) of Vazineh District. (Note: Renamed the Central District of Mirabad County) The following census in 2011 counted 684 people in 166 households, by which time the village was listed as Banaveh. The 2016 census measured the population of the village as 637 people in 170 households.

In 2020, Gavork-e Sardasht Rural District was separated from the Central District in the formation of Rabat District and Banaveh was transferred to the rural district. In 2022, Vazineh District was separated from the county in the establishment of Mirabad County and renamed the Central District. Melkari Rural District was transferred to the new Zab District and renamed Melkari-ye Gharbi Rural District.
