= Banaveh, Alan =

Banaveh بناوه
- Village
- Location within Iran
- Coordinates: 36°01′22″N 45°27′00″E
- Country: Iran
- Province: West Azerbaijan
- County: Sardasht
- Bakhsh: Central
- Rural District: Alan

Population (2006)
  - Total: 77
- Time zone: UTC+3:30 (IRST)
  - Summer (DST): UTC+4:30 (IRDT)

Banaveh (Persian: بناوه, also Romanized as Banāveh; also known as Banāvīyeh) is a village in Alan Rural District, in the Central District of Sardasht County, West Azerbaijan Province, Iran. At the 2006 census, its population was 77, in 20 families.
