= Barikayi =

Village in West Azerbaijan province, Iran

Barikayi Persian: باريكايي
- Village
- Location within Iran
- Coordinates: 36°11′19″N 45°38′59″E
- Country: Iran
- Province: West Azerbaijan
- County: Sardasht
- District: Rabat
- Rural District: Gavork-e Sardasht

Population (2016)
  - Total: 123
- Time zone: UTC+3:30 (IRST)

Barikayi (Persian: باريكايي) (Note: Also romanized as Bārīkāyī; also known as Bārīkā) is a village in Gavork-e Sardasht Rural District of Rabat District in Sardasht County, West Azerbaijan province, Iran.

== Demographics ==
=== Population ===
At the time of the 2006 National Census, the village's population was 179 in 34 households, when it was in the Central District. The following census in 2011 counted 139 people in 37 households. The 2016 census measured the population of the village as 123 people in 35 households.

In 2020, the rural district was separated from the district in the formation of Rabat District.
