= Balav =

Balav بلاو
- Village
- Interactive map of Balav
- Coordinates: 36°15′10″N 45°31′21″E
- Country: Iran
- Province: West Azerbaijan
- County: Sardasht
- Bakhsh: Central
- Rural District: Gavork-e Sardasht

Population (2006)
  - Total: 189
- Time zone: UTC+3:30 (IRST)
  - Summer (DST): UTC+4:30 (IRDT)

Balav (Persian: بلاو, also Romanized as Balāv) is a village in Gavork-e Sardasht Rural District, in the Central District of Sardasht County, West Azerbaijan Province, Iran. At the 2006 census, its population was 189, in 30 families.
