= Shiveh Asal =

Village in West Azerbaijan province, Iran

Shiveh Asal Persian: شيوه اصل
- Village
- Location within Iran
- Coordinates: 36°15′05″N 45°29′12″E
- Country: Iran
- Province: West Azerbaijan
- County: Sardasht
- District: Rabat
- Rural District: Gavork-e Sardasht

Population (2016)
  - Total: 109
- Time zone: UTC+3:30 (IRST)

Shiveh Asal (Persian: شيوه اصل) (Note: Formerly known as Shiveh Sal (شيوه صل), also romanized as Shīveh Şal) is a village in Gavork-e Sardasht Rural District of Rabat District in Sardasht County, West Azerbaijan province, Iran.

== Demographics ==
=== Population ===
At the time of the 2006 National Census, the village's population, as Shiveh Sal, was 114 in 21 households, when it was in Melkari Rural District (Note: Renamed Melkari-ye Gharbi Rural District) of Vazineh District. (Note: Renamed the Central District of Mirabad County) The following census in 2011 counted 122 people in 30 households, by which time the village was listed as Shiveh Asal. The 2016 census measured the population of the village as 109 people in 22 households.

In 2020, Gavork-e Sardasht Rural District was separated from the Central District in the formation of Rabat District and Shiveh Asal was transferred to the rural district. In 2022, Vazineh District was separated from the county in the establishment of Mirabad County and renamed the Central District. Melkari Rural District was transferred to the new Zab District and renamed Melkari-ye Gharbi Rural District.
