= Kaneh Mashkeh =

Kaneh Mashkeh كنه مشكه
- Village
- Location within Iran
- Coordinates: 36°11′42″N 45°22′58″E
- Country: Iran
- Province: West Azerbaijan
- County: Sardasht
- Bakhsh: Central
- Rural District: Baryaji

Population (2006)
  - Total: 252
- Time zone: UTC+3:30 (IRST)
  - Summer (DST): UTC+4:30 (IRDT)

Kaneh Mashkeh (Persian: كنه مشكه) is a village in Baryaji Rural District, in the Central District of Sardasht County, West Azerbaijan Province, Iran. At the 2006 census, its population was 252, in 49 families.
