= Bari Ashi =

Bari Ashi بري اشي
- Village
- Location within Iran
- Coordinates: 36°05′38″N 45°25′41″E
- Country: Iran
- Province: West Azerbaijan
- County: Sardasht
- Bakhsh: Central
- Rural District: Baryaji

Population (2006)
  - Total: 15
- Time zone: UTC+3:30 (IRST)
  - Summer (DST): UTC+4:30 (IRDT)

Bari Ashi (Persian: بري اشي, also Romanized as Barī Āshī; also known as Barpāshī) is a village in Baryaji Rural District, in the Central District of Sardasht County, West Azerbaijan Province, Iran. At the 2006 census, its population was 15, in 4 families.
