= Nestan =

Village in West Azerbaijan province, Iran

Nestan Persian: نستان
- Village
- Location within Iran
- Coordinates: 36°17′01″N 45°37′47″E
- Country: Iran
- Province: West Azerbaijan
- County: Sardasht
- District: Rabat
- Rural District: Gavork-e Sardasht

Population (2016)
  - Total: 507
- Time zone: UTC+3:30 (IRST)

Nestan (Persian: نستان) (Note: Also romanized as Nestān; also known as Neyestān and Nīstān) is a village in Gavork-e Sardasht Rural District of Rabat District in Sardasht County, West Azerbaijan province, Iran.

== Demographics ==
=== Population ===
At the time of the 2006 National Census, the village's population was 686 in 113 households, when it was in the Central District. The following census in 2011 counted 627 people in 159 households. The 2016 census measured the population of the village as 507 people in 104 households.

In 2020, the rural district was separated from the district in the formation of Rabat District.
