= Jabbarand =

Village in West Azerbaijan province, Iran

Jabbarand Persian: جبرند
- Village
- Location within Iran
- Coordinates: 36°17′43″N 45°32′11″E
- Country: Iran
- Province: West Azerbaijan
- County: Sardasht
- District: Rabat
- Rural District: Gavork-e Sardasht

Population (2016)
  - Total: 192
- Time zone: UTC+3:30 (IRST)

Jabbarand (Persian: جبرند) (Note: Also known as Jabbārān) is a village in Gavork-e Sardasht Rural District of Rabat District in Sardasht County, West Azerbaijan province, Iran.

== Demographics ==
=== Population ===
At the time of the 2006 National Census, the village's population was 271 in 43 households, when it was in Melkari Rural District (Note: Renamed Melkari-ye Gharbi Rural District) of Vazineh District. (Note: Renamed the Central District of Mirabad County) The following census in 2011 counted 202 people in 42 households. The 2016 census measured the population of the village as 192 people in 48 households.

In 2020, Gavork-e Sardasht Rural District was separated from the Central District in the formation of Rabat District and Jabbarand was transferred to the rural district. In 2022, Vazineh District was separated from the county in the establishment of Mirabad County and renamed the Central District. Melkari Rural District was transferred to the new Zab District and renamed Melkari-ye Gharbi Rural District.
