= Rasheh Hormeh =

Rasheh Hormeh رشه هرمه
- Village
- Location within Iran
- Coordinates: 36°07′19″N 45°26′41″E
- Country: Iran
- Province: West Azerbaijan
- County: Sardasht
- Bakhsh: Central
- Rural District: Baryaji

Population (2006)
  - Total: 129
- Time zone: UTC+3:30 (IRST)
  - Summer (DST): UTC+4:30 (IRDT)

Rasheh Hormeh (Persian: رشه هرمه; also known as Rash Hūmeh) is a village in Baryaji Rural District, in the Central District of Sardasht County, West Azerbaijan Province, Iran. At the 2006 census, its population was 129, in 23 families.
