= Gurankan =

Village in West Azerbaijan province, Iran

Gurankan Persian: گورانكان
- Village
- Location within Iran
- Coordinates: 36°12′28″N 45°29′05″E
- Country: Iran
- Province: West Azerbaijan
- County: Sardasht
- District: Rabat
- Rural District: Gavork-e Sardasht

Population (2016)
  - Total: 85
- Time zone: UTC+3:30 (IRST)

Gurankan (Persian: گورانكان) (Note: Also romanized as Gūrānkān; formerly known as Gurangan (گورانگان), also romanized as Gūrāngān; and Gūrāngah) is a village in Gavork-e Sardasht Rural District of Rabat District in Sardasht County, West Azerbaijan province, Iran.

== Demographics ==
=== Population ===
At the time of the 2006 National Census, the village's population, as Gurangan, was 135 in 25 households, when it was in Melkari Rural District (Note: Renamed Melkari-ye Gharbi Rural District) of Vazineh District. (Note: Renamed the Central District of Mirabad County) The following census in 2011 counted 112 people in 25 households, by which time the village was listed as Gurankan. The 2016 census measured the population of the village as 85 people in 22 households.

In 2020, Gavork-e Sardasht Rural District was separated from the Central District in the formation of Rabat District and Gurankan was transferred to the rural district. In 2022, Vazineh District was separated from the county in the establishment of Mirabad County and renamed the Central District. Melkari Rural District was transferred to the new Zab District and renamed Melkari-ye Gharbi Rural District.
