= Mikalabad =

Village in West Azerbaijan province, Iran

Mikalabad Persian: ميكل اباد
- Village
- Location within Iran
- Coordinates: 36°09′39″N 45°34′13″E
- Country: Iran
- Province: West Azerbaijan
- County: Sardasht
- District: Rabat
- Rural District: Bask-e Kuleseh

Population (2016)
  - Total: 254
- Time zone: UTC+3:30 (IRST)

Mikalabad (Persian: ميكل اباد) (Note: Also romanized as Mīkalābād) is a village in Bask-e Kuleseh Rural District of Rabat District in Sardasht County, West Azerbaijan province, Iran.

== Demographics ==
=== Population ===
At the time of the 2006 National Census, the village's population was 335 in 61 households, when it was in the Central District. The following census in 2011 counted 273 people in 51 households. The 2016 census measured the population of the village as 254 people in 62 households.

In 2020, the rural district was separated from the district in the formation of Rabat District.
