= Khareh =

Khareh (Persian: خره) may refer to:

- Khareh, Isfahan
- Khareh-ye Aghlan, West Azerbaijan Province
- Khareh-ye Chaki, West Azerbaijan Province
