= Zuran, West Azerbaijan =

Village in West Azerbaijan province, Iran

Zuran Persian: زوران
- Village
- Location within Iran
- Coordinates: 36°10′50″N 45°24′03″E
- Country: Iran
- Province: West Azerbaijan
- County: Sardasht
- District: Central
- Rural District: Baryaji

Population (2016)
  - Total: 723
- Time zone: UTC+3:30 (IRST)

Zuran (Persian: زوران) (Note: Also romanized as Zūrān) is a village in Baryaji Rural District of the Central District in Sardasht County, West Azerbaijan province, Iran.

== Demographics ==
=== Population ===
At the time of the 2006 National Census, the village's population was 595 in 105 households. The following census in 2011 counted 666 people in 158 households. The 2016 census measured the population of the village as 723 people in 179 households.
