= Shivashan =

Shivashan (Persian: شيواشان) may refer to:

- Shivashan, Sardasht
- Shivashan, Vazineh, Sardasht County
