= Duleh, West Azerbaijan =

Duleh دوله
- Village
- Location within Iran
- Coordinates: 36°00′33″N 45°29′36″E
- Country: Iran
- Province: West Azerbaijan
- County: Sardasht
- Bakhsh: Central
- Rural District: Alan

Population (2006)
  - Total: 76
- Time zone: UTC+3:30 (IRST)
  - Summer (DST): UTC+4:30 (IRDT)

Duleh (Persian: دوله, also Romanized as Dūleh) is a village in Alan Rural District, in the Central District of Sardasht County, West Azerbaijan Province, Iran. At the 2006 census, its population was 76, in 17 families.
