= Banaveylah-e Hajji Mineh =

Banaveylah-e Hajji Mineh بناويله حاجي مينه
- Village
- Location within Iran
- Coordinates: 36°16′25″N 45°32′40″E
- Country: Iran
- Province: West Azerbaijan
- County: Sardasht
- Bakhsh: Central
- Rural District: Gavork-e Sardasht

Population (2006)
  - Total: 102
- Time zone: UTC+3:30 (IRST)
  - Summer (DST): UTC+4:30 (IRDT)

Banaveylah-e Hajji Mineh (Persian: بناويله حاجي مينه, also Romanized as Banāveylah-e Ḩājjī Mīneh; also known as Banāveylah) is a village in Gavork-e Sardasht Rural District, in the Central District of Sardasht County, West Azerbaijan Province, Iran. At the 2006 census, its population was 102, in 19 families.
