= Dulkan =

Village in West Azerbaijan province, Iran

Dulkan Persian: دولكان
- Village
- Location within Iran
- Coordinates: 36°02′33″N 45°26′00″E
- Country: Iran
- Province: West Azerbaijan
- County: Sardasht
- District: Central
- Rural District: Alan

Population (2016)
  - Total: 338
- Time zone: UTC+3:30 (IRST)

Dulkan (Persian: دولكان) (Note: Also romanized as Doolkan, Dūlakān, and Dūlkān; also known as Benaze) is a village in Alan Rural District of the Central District in Sardasht County, West Azerbaijan province, Iran.

== Demographics ==
=== Population ===
At the time of the 2006 National Census, the village's population was 286 in 64 households. The following census in 2011 counted 284 people in 73 households. The 2016 census measured the population of the village as 338 people in 90 households.
