= Rashkan-e Sofla =

Rashkan-e Sofla رشكان سفلي
- Village
- Location within Iran
- Coordinates: 36°00′36″N 45°29′01″E
- Country: Iran
- Province: West Azerbaijan
- County: Sardasht
- Bakhsh: Central
- Rural District: Alan

Population (2006)
  - Total: 24
- Time zone: UTC+3:30 (IRST)
  - Summer (DST): UTC+4:30 (IRDT)

Rashkan-e Sofla (Persian: رشكان سفلي, also Romanized as Rashkān-e Soflá; also known as Rashkān) is a village in Alan Rural District, in the Central District of Sardasht County, West Azerbaijan Province, Iran. At the 2006 census, its population was 24, in 7 families.
