= Kulkeh Rash-e Olya =

Kulkeh Rash-e Olya كولكه رش عليا
- Village
- Country: Iran
- Province: West Azerbaijan
- County: Sardasht
- Bakhsh: Central
- Rural District: Baryaji

Population (2006)
  - Total: 44
- Time zone: UTC+3:30 (IRST)
  - Summer (DST): UTC+4:30 (IRDT)

Kulkeh Rash-e Olya (Persian: كولكه رش عليا, also Romanized as Kūlkeh Rash-e ‘Olyā) is a village in Baryaji Rural District, in the Central District of Sardasht County, West Azerbaijan Province, Iran. At the 2006 census, its population was 44, in 7 families.
