= Mazraeh, Sardasht =

Village in West Azerbaijan province, Iran

Mazraeh Persian: مزرعه
- Village
- Location within Iran
- Coordinates: 36°02′13″N 45°22′54″E
- Country: Iran
- Province: West Azerbaijan
- County: Sardasht
- District: Central
- Rural District: Alan

Population (2016)
  - Total: 146
- Time zone: UTC+3:30 (IRST)

Mazraeh (Persian: مزرعه) (Note: Also romanized as Mazra‘eh) is a village in Alan Rural District of the Central District in Sardasht County, West Azerbaijan province, Iran.

== Demographics ==
=== Population ===
At the time of the 2006 National Census, the village's population was 122 in 28 households. The following census in 2011 counted 90 people in 25 households. The 2016 census measured the population of the village as 146 people in 43 households.
