= Dinaran =

Village in West Azerbaijan province, Iran

Dinaran Persian: ديناران
- Village
- Location within Iran
- Coordinates: 36°00′55″N 45°26′50″E
- Country: Iran
- Province: West Azerbaijan
- County: Sardasht
- District: Central
- Rural District: Alan

Population (2016)
  - Total: 170
- Time zone: UTC+3:30 (IRST)

Dinaran (Persian: ديناران) (Note: Also romanized as Dīnārān) is a village in Alan Rural District of the Central District in Sardasht County, West Azerbaijan province, Iran.

== Demographics ==
=== Population ===
At the time of the 2006 National Census, the village's population was 166 in 31 households. The following census in 2011 counted 174 people in 46 households. The 2016 census measured the population of the village as 170 people in 55 households.
