= Maraghan =

Village in West Azerbaijan province, Iran

Maraghan Persian: مراغان
- Village
- Location within Iran
- Coordinates: 36°07′45″N 45°28′05″E
- Country: Iran
- Province: West Azerbaijan
- County: Sardasht
- District: Central
- Rural District: Baryaji

Population (2016)
  - Total: 602
- Time zone: UTC+3:30 (IRST)

Maraghan (Persian: مراغان) (Note: Also romanized as Marāghān; also known as Margan) is a village in Baryaji Rural District of the Central District in Sardasht County, West Azerbaijan province, Iran.

== Demographics ==
=== Population ===
At the time of the 2006 National Census, the village's population was 384 in 78 households. The following census in 2011 counted 541 people in 137 households. The 2016 census measured the population of the village as 602 people in 151 households.
