= Mazanabad =

Mazanabad (Persian: مزن اباد) may refer to:

- Mazanabad, Sardasht
- Mazanabad, Vazineh, Sardasht County
