= Varagol =

Varagol or Vargel (Persian: ورگل) may refer to:

- Varagol, East Azerbaijan
- Varagol, West Azerbaijan
