= Vardeh, West Azerbaijan =

Village in West Azerbaijan province, Iran

Vardeh Persian: ورده
- Village
- Location within Iran
- Coordinates: 36°13′57″N 45°21′28″E
- Country: Iran
- Province: West Azerbaijan
- County: Sardasht
- District: Central
- Rural District: Baryaji

Population (2016)
  - Total: 651
- Time zone: UTC+3:30 (IRST)

Vardeh (Persian: ورده) is a village in Baryaji Rural District of the Central District in Sardasht County, West Azerbaijan province, Iran.

== Demographics ==
=== Population ===
At the time of the 2006 National Census, the village's population was 587 in 104 households. The following census in 2011 counted 701 people in 142 households. The 2016 census measured the population of the village as 651 people in 151 households.
