= Berzheh =

Village in West Azerbaijan province, Iran

Berzheh Persian: برژه
- Village
- Location within Iran
- Coordinates: 36°01′48″N 45°28′19″E
- Country: Iran
- Province: West Azerbaijan
- County: Sardasht
- District: Central
- Rural District: Alan

Population (2016)
  - Total: 1,056
- Time zone: UTC+3:30 (IRST)

Berzheh (Persian: برژه) (Note: Formerly known as Eslamabad (اسلام اباد), also romanized as Eslāmābād; also known as Bezhveh (‌بژوه)) is a village in, and the capital of, Alan Rural District in the Central District of Sardasht County, West Azerbaijan province, Iran.

== Demographics ==
=== Population ===
At the time of the 2006 National Census, the village's population, as Eslamabad, was 942 in 176 households. The following census in 2011 counted 989 people in 262 households, by which time the village was listed as Berzheh. The 2016 census measured the population of the village as 1,056 people in 302 households. It was the most populous village in its rural district.
