= Sarchaveh =

Sarchaveh (Persian: سرچاوه) may refer to:

- Sarchaveh, Sardasht
- Sarchaveh (Sarchava), Sardasht
