= Razgah, West Azerbaijan =

Village in West Azerbaijan province, Iran

Razgah Persian: رازگاه
- Village
- Location within Iran
- Coordinates: 36°03′35″N 45°30′45″E
- Country: Iran
- Province: West Azerbaijan
- County: Sardasht
- District: Central
- Rural District: Alan

Population (2016)
  - Total: 173
- Time zone: UTC+3:30 (IRST)

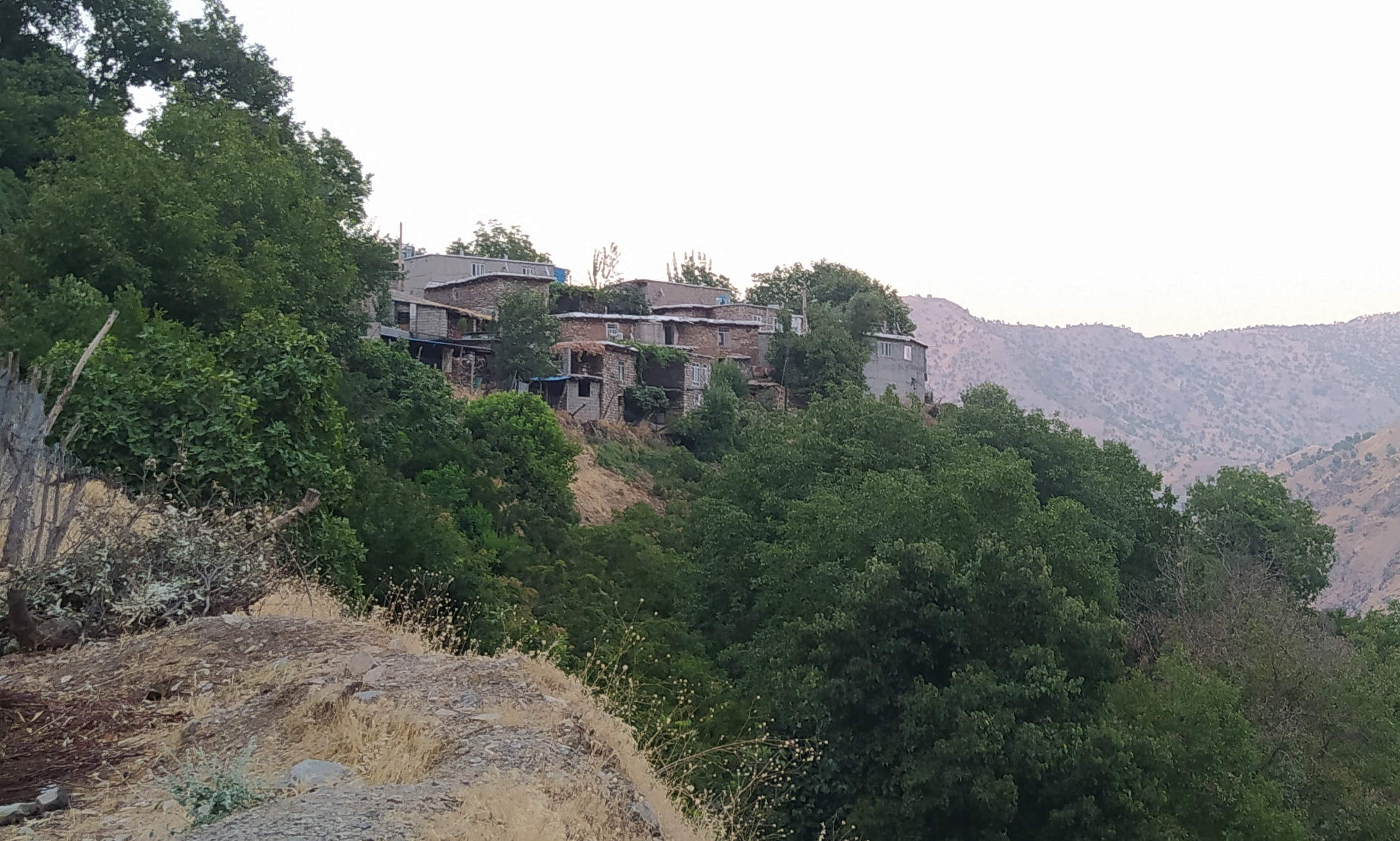
Razgah Village

Razgah (Persian: رازگاه) (Note: Also romanized as Rāzgāh) is a village in Alan Rural District of the Central District in Sardasht County, West Azerbaijan province, Iran.

== Demographics ==
=== Population ===
At the time of the 2006 National Census, the village's population was 163 in 36 households. The following census in 2011 counted 188 people in 47 households. The 2016 census measured the population of the village as 173 people in 47 households.
