= Basreh =

Basreh (Persian: بصره) may refer to:

- Basreh, Hormozgan
- Basreh, West Azerbaijan
