= Benavileh-ye Kuchak =

Village in West Azerbaijan province, Iran

Benavileh-ye Kuchak Persian: بناويله كوچك
- Village
- Location within Iran
- Coordinates: 36°07′15″N 45°37′05″E
- Country: Iran
- Province: West Azerbaijan
- County: Sardasht
- District: Rabat
- Rural District: Bask-e Kuleseh

Population (2016)
  - Total: 258
- Time zone: UTC+3:30 (IRST)

Benavileh-ye Kuchak (Persian: بناويله كوچك) (Note: Also romanized as Benāvīleh-ye Kūchak) is a village in Bask-e Kuleseh Rural District of Rabat District in Sardasht County, West Azerbaijan province, Iran.

== Demographics ==
=== Population ===
At the time of the 2006 National Census, the village's population was 360 in 67 households, when it was in the Central District. The following census in 2011 counted 290 people in 64 households. The 2016 census measured the population of the village as 258 people in 65 households.

In 2020, the rural district was separated from the district in the formation of Rabat District.
