= Varagol, West Azerbaijan =

Village in West Azerbaijan province, Iran

Varagol Persian: ورگل
- Village
- Location within Iran
- Coordinates: 36°16′11″N 45°30′45″E
- Country: Iran
- Province: West Azerbaijan
- County: Sardasht
- District: Rabat
- Rural District: Gavork-e Sardasht

Population (2016)
  - Total: 426
- Time zone: UTC+3:30 (IRST)

Varagol (Persian: ورگل) (Note: Also romanized as Vargel; also known as Vargīl) is a village in Gavork-e Sardasht Rural District of Rabat District in Sardasht County, West Azerbaijan province, Iran.

== Demographics ==
=== Population ===
At the time of the 2006 National Census, the village's population was 423 in 79 households, when it was in Melkari Rural District (Note: Renamed Melkari-ye Gharbi Rural District) of Vazineh District. (Note: Renamed the Central District of Mirabad County) The following census in 2011 counted 399 people in 107 households. The 2016 census measured the population of the village as 426 people in 98 households.

In 2020, Gavork-e Sardasht Rural District was separated from the Central District in the formation of Rabat District and Varagol was transferred to the rural district. In 2022, Vazineh District was separated from the county in the establishment of Mirabad County and renamed the Central District. Melkari Rural District was transferred to the new Zab District and renamed Melkari-ye Gharbi Rural District.
