= Sanjuh =

Village in West Azerbaijan province, Iran

Sanjuh Persian: سنجوه
- Village
- Location within Iran
- Coordinates: 36°00′52″N 45°29′23″E
- Country: Iran
- Province: West Azerbaijan
- County: Sardasht
- District: Central
- Rural District: Alan

Population (2016)
  - Total: 403
- Time zone: UTC+3:30 (IRST)

Sanjuh (Persian: سنجوه) (Note: Also romanized as Sanjūh) is a village in Alan Rural District of the Central District in Sardasht County, West Azerbaijan province, Iran.

== Demographics ==
=== Population ===
At the time of the 2006 National Census, the village's population was 448 in 90 households. The following census in 2011 counted 410 people in 123 households. The 2016 census measured the population of the village as 403 people in 135 households.
