= Mir Sheykh Heydar =

Village in West Azerbaijan province, Iran

Mir Sheykh Heydar Persian: ميرشيخ حيدر
- Village
- Location within Iran
- Coordinates: 36°10′11″N 45°26′32″E
- Country: Iran
- Province: West Azerbaijan
- County: Sardasht
- District: Central
- Rural District: Baryaji

Population (2016)
  - Total: 329
- Time zone: UTC+3:30 (IRST)

Mir Sheykh Heydar (Persian: ميرشيخ حيدر) (Note: Also romanized as Mīr Sheykh Ḩeydar) is a village in Baryaji Rural District of the Central District in Sardasht County, West Azerbaijan province, Iran.

== Demographics ==
=== Population ===
At the time of the 2006 National Census, the village's population was 287 in 61 households. The following census in 2011 counted 327 people in 79 households. The 2016 census measured the population of the village as 329 people in 87 households.
