= Bitush =

Village in West Azerbaijan province, Iran

Bitush Persian: بيطوش
- Village
- Location within Iran
- Coordinates: 36°02′47″N 45°22′58″E
- Country: Iran
- Province: West Azerbaijan
- County: Sardasht
- District: Central
- Rural District: Alan

Population (2016)
  - Total: 934
- Time zone: UTC+3:30 (IRST)

Bitush (Persian: بيطوش) (Note: Also romanized as Beytūsh and Bītūsh) is a village in Alan Rural District of the Central District in Sardasht County, West Azerbaijan province, Iran.

== Demographics ==
=== Population ===
At the time of the 2006 National Census, the village's population was 817 in 179 households. The following census in 2011 counted 928 people in 235 households. The 2016 census measured the population of the village as 934 people in 276 households.
