= Kur Bonav =

Village in West Azerbaijan province, Iran

Kur Bonav Persian: كوربناو
- Village
- Location within Iran
- Coordinates: 36°10′27″N 45°25′20″E
- Country: Iran
- Province: West Azerbaijan
- County: Sardasht
- District: Central
- Rural District: Baryaji

Population (2016)
  - Total: 350
- Time zone: UTC+3:30 (IRST)

Kur Bonav (Persian: كوربناو) (Note: Also romanized as Kūr Bonāv; also known as Kūr Bonāb) is a village in Baryaji Rural District of the Central District in Sardasht County, West Azerbaijan province, Iran.

== Demographics ==
=== Population ===
At the time of the 2006 National Census, the village's population was 362 in 62 households. The following census in 2011 counted 378 people in 75 households. The 2016 census measured the population of the village as 350 people in 79 households.
