= Kulseh =

Kulseh (Persian: كولسه) may refer to:

- Kulseh-ye Olya
- Kulseh-ye Sofla
