= Kulseh-ye Sofla =

Village in West Azerbaijan province, Iran

Kulseh-ye Sofla Persian: كولسه سفلي
- Village
- Location within Iran
- Coordinates: 36°05′54″N 45°34′48″E
- Country: Iran
- Province: West Azerbaijan
- County: Sardasht
- District: Rabat
- Rural District: Bask-e Kuleseh

Population (2016)
  - Total: 714
- Time zone: UTC+3:30 (IRST)

Kulseh-ye Sofla (Persian: كولسه سفلي) (Note: Also romanized as Kūlseh-ye Soflá; also known as Kūlseh-ye Pā'īn) is a village in Bask-e Kuleseh Rural District of Rabat District in Sardasht County, West Azerbaijan province, Iran.

== Demographics ==
=== Population ===
At the time of the 2006 National Census, the village's population was 730 in 123 households, when it was in the Central District. The following census in 2011 counted 754 people in 157 households. The 2016 census measured the population of the village as 714 people in 153 households. It was the most populous village in its rural district.

In 2020, the rural district was separated from the district in the formation of Rabat District.
