= Khaneh Khal =

Khaneh Khal (Persian: خانه خل) may refer to:

- Khaneh Khal-e Olya
- Khaneh Khal-e Sofla
