= Qaleh Rash =

Village in West Azerbaijan province, Iran

Qaleh Rash Persian: قلعه رش
- Village
- Location within Iran
- Coordinates: 36°07′28″N 45°24′51″E
- Country: Iran
- Province: West Azerbaijan
- County: Sardasht
- District: Central
- Rural District: Baryaji

Population (2016)
  - Total: 1,242
- Time zone: UTC+3:30 (IRST)

Qaleh Rash (Persian: قلعه رش) (Note: Also romanized as Qal'eh Rash; also known as Qal’eh Rasheh and Qal‘eh-ye Rasheh) is a village in Baryaji Rural District of the Central District in Sardasht County, West Azerbaijan province, Iran.

== Demographics ==
=== Population ===
At the time of the 2006 National Census, the village's population was 1,140 in 233 households. The following census in 2011 counted 1,195 people in 254 households. The 2016 census measured the population of the village as 1,242 people in 321 households.
