= Galineh =

Galineh (Persian: گلينه) may refer to:

- Galineh-ye Bozorg
- Galineh-ye Kuchak
