= Khareh-ye Chaki =

Khareh-ye Chaki خره چاكي
- Village
- Country: Iran
- Province: West Azerbaijan
- County: Sardasht
- Bakhsh: Central
- Rural District: Baryaji

Population (2006)
  - Total: 30
- Time zone: UTC+3:30 (IRST)
  - Summer (DST): UTC+4:30 (IRDT)

Khareh-ye Chaki (Persian: خره چاكي, also Romanized as Khareh-ye Chākī) is a village in Baryaji Rural District, in the Central District of Sardasht County, West Azerbaijan Province, Iran. At the 2006 census, its population was 30, in 5 families.
