= Galineh-ye Bozorg =

Galineh-ye Bozorg گلينه بزرگ
- Village
- Location within Iran
- Coordinates: 36°06′34″N 45°28′13″E
- Country: Iran
- Province: West Azerbaijan
- County: Sardasht
- Bakhsh: Central
- Rural District: Baryaji

Population (2006)
  - Total: 68
- Time zone: UTC+3:30 (IRST)
  - Summer (DST): UTC+4:30 (IRDT)

Galineh-ye Bozorg (Persian: گلينه بزرگ, also Romanized as Galīneh-ye Bozorg; also known as Galīneh-ye ‘Olyā) is a village in Baryaji Rural District, in the Central District of Sardasht County, West Azerbaijan Province, Iran. At the 2006 census, its population was 68, in 14 families.
