= Khareh-ye Aghlan =

Coordinates: 36.5547°N 45.2686°E

Khareh-ye Aghlan خره اغلان
- Village
- Interactive map of Khareh-ye Aghlan
- Country: Iran
- Province: West Azerbaijan
- County: Sardasht
- Bakhsh: Central
- Rural District: Baryaji

Population (2006)
  - Total: 23
- Time zone: UTC+3:30 (IRST)
  - Summer (DST): UTC+4:30 (IRDT)

Khareh-ye Aghlan (Persian: خره اغلان, also Romanized as Khareh-ye Āghlān) is a village in Baryaji Rural District, in the Central District of Sardasht County, West Azerbaijan Province, Iran. At the 2006 census, its population was 23, in 6 families.
