= Boyuran =

Boyuran (Persian: بيوران), also rendered as Boyoran or Beyuran, may refer to:

- Boyuran-e Olya
- Boyuran-e Sofla
