= Kulseh-ye Olya =

Village in West Azerbaijan province, Iran

Kulseh-ye Olya Persian: كولسه عليا
- Village
- Location within Iran
- Coordinates: 36°05′45″N 45°33′04″E
- Country: Iran
- Province: West Azerbaijan
- County: Sardasht
- District: Rabat
- Rural District: Bask-e Kuleseh

Population (2016)
  - Total: 402
- Time zone: UTC+3:30 (IRST)

Kulseh-ye Olya (Persian: كولسه عليا) (Note: Also romanized as Kūlseh-ye ‘Olyā; also known as Kūlseh-ye Bālā) is a village in Bask-e Kuleseh Rural District of Rabat District in Sardasht County, West Azerbaijan province, Iran.

== Demographics ==
=== Population ===
At the time of the 2006 National Census, the village's population was 500 in 86 households, when it was in the Central District. The following census in 2011 counted 402 people in 90 households. The 2016 census measured the population of the village as 402 people in 104 households.

In 2020, the rural district was separated from the district in the formation of Rabat District.
