= Kulkeh Rash =

Kulkeh Rash (Persian: كولكه رش) may refer to:

- Kulkeh Rash-e Olya
- Kulkeh Rash-e Sofla
