= Shivashan, Sardasht =

Shivashan شيواشان
- Village
- Location within Iran
- Coordinates: 36°09′35″N 45°31′08″E
- Country: Iran
- Province: West Azerbaijan
- County: Sardasht
- Bakhsh: Central
- Rural District: Bask-e Kuleseh

Population (2006)
  - Total: 118
- Time zone: UTC+3:30 (IRST)
  - Summer (DST): UTC+4:30 (IRDT)

Shivashan (Persian: شيواشان, also Romanized as Shīvāshān; also known as Shīvāshā) is a village in Bask-e Kuleseh Rural District, in the Central District of Sardasht County, West Azerbaijan Province, Iran. At the 2006 census, its population was 118, in 25 families.
