= Gavazleh =

Gavazleh or Govozleh (Persian: گوزله) may refer to:

- Govozleh, Kurdistan
- Gavazleh, West Azerbaijan
