= Beyuran-e Sofla =

Village in West Azerbaijan province, Iran

Beyuran-e Sofla Persian: بيوران سفلي
- Village
- Location within Iran
- Coordinates: 36°09′47″N 45°24′30″E
- Country: Iran
- Province: West Azerbaijan
- County: Sardasht
- District: Central
- Rural District: Baryaji

Population (2016)
  - Total: 1,309
- Time zone: UTC+3:30 (IRST)

Beyuran-e Sofla (Persian: بيوران سفلي) (Note: Also romanized as Beyūrān-e Soflá; also known as Beyūrān-e Pā’īn, Boyūrān-e Pā'īn, and Boyūrān-e Soflá) is a village in, and the capital of, Baryaji Rural District in the Central District of Sardasht County, West Azerbaijan province, Iran.

== Demographics ==
=== Population ===
At the time of the 2006 National Census, the village's population was 1,261 in 238 households. The following census in 2011 counted 1,534 people in 337 households. The 2016 census measured the population of the village as 1,309 people in 365 households. It was the most populous village in its rural district.
