= Duleh-ye Garm =

Village in West Azerbaijan province, Iran

Duleh-ye Garm Persian: دوله گرم
- Village
- Location within Iran
- Coordinates: 36°05′36″N 45°26′37″E
- Country: Iran
- Province: West Azerbaijan
- County: Sardasht
- District: Central
- Rural District: Baryaji

Population (2016)
  - Total: 355
- Time zone: UTC+3:30 (IRST)

Duleh-ye Garm (Persian: دوله گرم) (Note: Also romanized as Dūleh-ye Garm; also known as Dowla Garm, Dowlā Garm, and Dūleh-ye Karam) is a village in Baryaji Rural District of the Central District in Sardasht County, West Azerbaijan province, Iran.

== Demographics ==
=== Population ===
At the time of the 2006 National Census, the village's population was 392 in 89 households. The following census in 2011 counted 382 people in 90 households. The 2016 census measured the population of the village as 355 people in 100 households.
