= Gavork =

Gavork (Persian: گورك) may refer to:

- Gavork-e Nalin Rural District
- Gavork-e Sardasht Rural District
