= Koha =

Koha may refer to:

- Koha (custom), a New Zealand Māori custom of gift giving
- Koha (software), an open-source integrated library system
- Koha, Iran, a village
- Kalju Koha, Estonian politician
- Koharu Kusumi, a Japanese pop singer
- KOHA-LD, a low-power television station (channel 27) licensed to serve Omaha, Nebraska, United States
