= Beyuran-e Olya =

Village in West Azerbaijan province, Iran

Beyuran-e Olya Persian: بيوران عليا
- Village
- Location within Iran
- Coordinates: 36°10′45″N 45°23′01″E
- Country: Iran
- Province: West Azerbaijan
- County: Sardasht
- District: Central
- Rural District: Baryaji

Population (2016)
  - Total: 560
- Time zone: UTC+3:30 (IRST)

Beyuran-e Olya (Persian: بيوران عليا) (Note: Also romanized as Beyūrān-e ‘Olyā; also known as Boyorān, Boyūrān, and Boyuran-e Olya, also romanized as Boyūrān-e ‘Olyā) is a village in Baryaji Rural District of the Central District in Sardasht County, West Azerbaijan province, Iran.

== Demographics ==
=== Population ===
At the time of the 2006 National Census, the village's population was 570 in 119 households. The following census in 2011 counted 585 people in 149 households. The 2016 census measured the population of the village as 560 people in 163 households.
