= Mazanabad, Sardasht =

Village in West Azerbaijan province, Iran

Mazanabad Persian: مزن اباد
- Village
- Location within Iran
- Coordinates: 36°00′51″N 45°23′25″E
- Country: Iran
- Province: West Azerbaijan
- County: Sardasht
- District: Central
- Rural District: Alan

Population (2016)
  - Total: 381
- Time zone: UTC+3:30 (IRST)

Mazanabad (Persian: مزن اباد) (Note: Also romanized as Mazanābād) is a village in Alan Rural District of the Central District in Sardasht County, West Azerbaijan province, Iran.

== Demographics ==
=== Population ===
At the time of the 2006 National Census, the village's population was 244 in 51 households. The following census in 2011 counted 307 people in 80 households. The 2016 census measured the population of the village as 381 people in 107 households.
