= Gavazleh, West Azerbaijan =

Village in West Azerbaijan province, Iran

Gavazleh Persian: گوزله
- Village
- Location within Iran
- Country: Iran
- Province: West Azerbaijan
- County: Sardasht
- District: Central
- Rural District: Alan

Population (2016)
  - Total: 122
- Time zone: UTC+3:30 (IRST)

Gavazleh (Persian: گوزله) (Note: Also known as Gavazlī) is a village in Alan Rural District of the Central District in Sardasht County, West Azerbaijan province, Iran.

== Demographics ==
=== Population ===
At the time of the 2006 National Census, the village's population was 82 in 18 households. The following census in 2011 counted 90 people in 20 households. The 2016 census measured the population of the village as 122 people in 32 households.
