= Rabat, Iran =

City in West Azerbaijan province, Iran

Rabat Persian: ربط
- City
- Location within Iran
- Coordinates: 36°12′44″N 45°33′04″E
- Country: Iran
- Province: West Azerbaijan
- County: Sardasht
- District: Rabat

Population (2016)
  - Total: 15,750
- Time zone: UTC+3:30 (IRST)
- Area code: +98444436
- Website: rabatcity.ir

Rabat (Persian: ربط) (Note: Also romanized as Rabaṭ) is a city in, and the capital of, Rabat District of Sardasht County, West Azerbaijan province, Iran, in the northeastern portion of the county. It served as the administrative center for Gavork-e Sardasht Rural District until its capital was transferred to the village of Si Sar. Rabat is on the road between Sardasht and Mahabad.

== Demographics ==
=== Language ===
The majority of the people of Rabat are ethnic Kurds who speak the Mokryan accent of Kurdish as one of their main languages alongside Persian.

=== Population ===
At the time of the 2006 National Census, the city's population was 7,987 in 1,607 households, when it was in the Central District. The following census in 2011 counted 12,068 people in 2,965 households. The 2016 census measured the population of the city as 15,750 people in 4,030 households.

In 2020, the city was separated from the district in the formation of Rabat District.

== Historical monuments ==
Rabat city has historical monuments dating back to ancient Iranian dynasties, such as the Musasir temple, which dates back to the era of the Iranian Medes.
