= Kani Grawan =

Spring located in Iran

Coordinates: 36.2253°N 45.5397°E

Kani Garavan Mineral Spring
- کانی گراوان
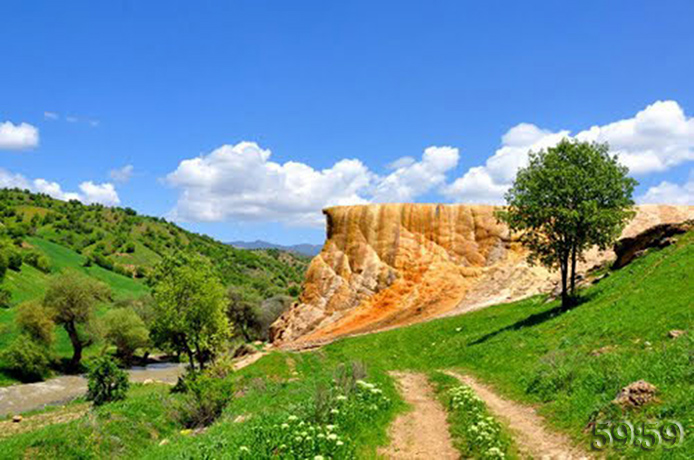
- Interactive map of Kani Garavan Mineral Spring
- Location: Sardasht County, West Azerbaijan, Iran
- Type: Mineral spring

Kani Garavan Mineral Spring (Persian: کانی گراوان), located approximately 12 kilometers northeast of Sardasht in West Azerbaijan Province, Iran, is a unique mineral spring known for its high salinity and natural rock formations. The name "Kani Garavan" translates to "heavy water spring" in the local Kurdish dialect which is Sorani.

== Description ==
The spring is situated near the village of Kani Gaviz, within the southeast of the Zab Basin. The water, which emerges from the ground at a boiling temperature, contains a high concentration of dissolved salts, rendering it undrinkable. The mineral-rich water has contributed to the creation of white and colorful mineral deposits, giving the landscape a distinctive and picturesque appearance.

== Tourism ==
Despite its undrinkable water, Kani Garavan Mineral Spring is considered a local tourist attraction. Visitors are drawn to its unique scenery, potential therapeutic properties, and the cultural heritage of the surrounding region. However, the site remains relatively unknown internationally, likely due to its remote location and limited promotion.

== See also ==
- List of springs
- West Azerbaijan Province
