= Nalas =

City in West Azerbaijan province, Iran

Nalas Persian: نلاس Kurdish: نالاس
- City
- Location within Iran
- Coordinates: 36°15′47″N 45°29′36″E
- Country: Iran
- Province: West Azerbaijan
- County: Sardasht
- District: Rabat
- Established as a city: 2018

Population (2016)
  - Total: 8,503
- Time zone: UTC+3:30 (IRST)

Nalas (Persian: نلاس) (Note: Also romanized as Nalās) is a city in Rabat District of Sardasht County, West Azerbaijan province, Iran.

== Demographics ==
=== Population ===
At the time of the 2006 National Census, Nalas's population was 5,891 in 1,088 households, when it was a village in Melkari Rural District (Note: Renamed Melkari-ye Gharbi Rural District) of Vazineh District. (Note: Renamed the Central District of Mirabad County) The following census in 2011 counted 6,985 people in 1,740 households. The 2016 census measured the population of the village as 8,503 people in 2,125 households. It was the most populous village in its rural district.

The village of Nalas was converted to a city in 2018, and in 2022 it was transferred to Rabat District.
