= Nahr ol Dowleh =

Nahr ol Dowleh نهرالدوله
- Village
- Location within Iran
- Coordinates: 34°30′03″N 47°55′44″E
- Country: Iran
- Province: Kermanshah
- County: Kangavar
- Bakhsh: Central
- Rural District: Kermajan

Population (2006)
  - Total: 187
- Time zone: UTC+3:30 (IRST)
  - Summer (DST): UTC+4:30 (IRDT)

Nahr ol Dowleh (Persian: نهرالدوله; also known as Dowleh) is a village in Kermajan Rural District, in the Central District of Kangavar County, Kermanshah Province, Iran. At the 2006 census, its population was 187, in 49 families.
