= Basreh, Hormozgan =

Basreh بصره
- Village
- Location within Iran
- Coordinates: 26°16′00″N 57°14′00″E
- Country: Iran
- Province: Hormozgan
- County: Minab
- Bakhsh: Byaban
- Rural District: Byaban

Population (2006)
  - Total: 117
- Time zone: UTC+3:30 (IRST)
  - Summer (DST): UTC+4:30 (IRDT)

Basreh (Persian: بصره, also Romanized as Başreh; also known as Bazreh) is a village in Byaban Rural District, Byaban District, Minab County, Hormozgan Province, Iran. At the 2006 census, its population was 117, in 19 families.
