= Duleh, Razavi Khorasan =

Duleh دوله
- Village
- Location within Iran
- Coordinates: 36°42′17″N 59°24′16″E
- Country: Iran
- Province: Razavi Khorasan
- County: Mashhad
- Bakhsh: Central
- Rural District: Darzab

Population (2006)
  - Total: 582
- Time zone: UTC+3:30 (IRST)
  - Summer (DST): UTC+4:30 (IRDT)

Duleh (Persian: دوله, also Romanized as Dūleh and Dowleh) is a village in Darzab Rural District, in the Central District of Mashhad County, Razavi Khorasan Province, Iran. At the 2006 census, its population was 582, in 153 families.
