= Govozleh, Kurdistan =

Govozleh گوزله
- Village
- Location within Iran
- Coordinates: 35°55′27″N 45°57′17″E
- Country: Iran
- Province: Kurdistan
- County: Baneh
- Bakhsh: Namshir
- Rural District: Kani Sur

Population (2006)
  - Total: 63
- Time zone: UTC+3:30 (IRST)
  - Summer (DST): UTC+4:30 (IRDT)

Govozleh (Persian: گوزله; also known as Gūyzleh) is a village in Kani Sur Rural District, Namshir District, Baneh County, Kurdistan Province, Iran. At the 2006 census, its population was 63, in 10 families. The village is populated by Kurds.
