= Benavileh-ye Kohneh =

Benavileh-ye Kohneh بناويله كهنه
- Village
- Location within Iran
- Coordinates: 36°07′26″N 45°41′11″E
- Country: Iran
- Province: Kurdistan
- County: Baneh
- Bakhsh: Namshir
- Rural District: Nameh Shir

Population (2006)
  - Total: 120
- Time zone: UTC+3:30 (IRST)
  - Summer (DST): UTC+4:30 (IRDT)

Benavileh-ye Kohneh (Persian: بناويله كهنه, also Romanized as Benāvīleh-ye Kohneh, Benāveyleh Kohneh, Benāveyleh-ye Kohneh, and Benāvīleh Kohneh; also known as Koha) is a village in Nameh Shir Rural District, Namshir District, Baneh County, Kurdistan Province, Iran. At the 2006 census, its population was 120, in 25 families. The village is populated by Kurds.
