= Alan Rural District =

Rural district in West Azerbaijan province, Iran

Alan Rural District Persian: دهستان آلان
- Rural District
- Location within Iran
- Coordinates: 36°01′N 45°28′E
- Country: Iran
- Province: West Azerbaijan
- County: Sardasht
- District: Central
- Established: 1987
- Capital: Berzheh

Population (2016)
  - Total: 4,907
- Time zone: UTC+3:30 (IRST)

Alan Rural District (Persian: دهستان آلان) is in the Central District of Sardasht County, West Azerbaijan province, Iran. Its capital is the village of Berzheh. (Note: Formerly Eslamabad)

== Demographics ==
=== Population ===
At the time of the 2006 National Census, the rural district's population was 4,489 in 939 households. There were 4,756 inhabitants in 1,236 households at the following census of 2011. The 2016 census measured the population of the rural district as 4,907 in 1,431 households. The most populous of its 51 villages was Berzheh, with 1,056 people.

=== Other villages in the rural district ===
- Bitush
- Dinaran
- Dulkan
- Gavazleh
- Mazanabad
- Mazraeh
- Razgah
- Sanjuh
