= Gavork-e Sardasht Rural District =

Rural district in West Azerbaijan province, Iran

Gavork-e Sardasht Rural District Persian: دهستان گورك سردشت
- Rural District
- Location within Iran
- Coordinates: 36°15′N 45°37′E
- Country: Iran
- Province: West Azerbaijan
- County: Sardasht
- District: Rabat
- Established: 1987
- Capital: Si Sar

Population (2016)
  - Total: 3,364
- Time zone: UTC+3:30 (IRST)

Gavork-e Sardasht Rural District (Persian: دهستان گورك سردشت) is in Rabat District of Sardasht County, West Azerbaijan province, Iran. Its capital is the village of Si Sar. The rural district was previously administered from the city of Rabat.

== Demographics ==
=== Population ===
At the time of the 2006 National Census, the rural district's population (as a part of the Central District) was 5,316 in 887 households. There were 4,137 inhabitants in 1,032 households at the following census of 2011. The 2016 census measured the population of the rural district as 3,364 in 766 households. The most populous of its 31 villages was Si Sar, with 641 people.

In 2020, the rural district was separated from the district in the formation of Rabat District.

=== Other villages in the rural district ===
- Banaveh
- Barikayi
- Bezileh
- Bishasb
- Guleh
- Gurankan
- Hendabad
- Jabbarand
- Leylaneh
- Nestan
- Sartakeh
- Shinu
- Shiveh Asal
- Sirveh
- Valiv
- Varagol
- Zamziran
