= Bask-e Kuleseh Rural District =

Rural district in West Azerbaijan province, Iran

Bask-e Kuleseh Rural District Persian: دهستان باسك كولسه
- Rural District
- Location within Iran
- Coordinates: 36°07′N 45°34′E
- Country: Iran
- Province: West Azerbaijan
- County: Sardasht
- District: Rabat
- Established: 1987
- Capital: Berisu

Population (2016)
  - Total: 4,233
- Time zone: UTC+3:30 (IRST)

Bask-e Kuleseh Rural District (Persian: دهستان باسك كولسه) is in Rabat District of Sardasht County, West Azerbaijan province, Iran. Its capital is the village of Berisu.

== Demographics ==
=== Population ===
At the time of the 2006 National Census, the rural district's population (as a part of the Central District) was 6,212 in 1,119 households. There were 5,040 inhabitants in 1,130 households at the following census of 2011. The 2016 census measured the population of the rural district as 4,233 in 1,027 households. The most populous of its 42 villages was Kulseh-ye Sofla, with 714 people.

In 2020, the rural district was separated from the district in the formation of Rabat District.

=== Other villages in the rural district ===
- Bagh
- Banehzir
- Benavileh-ye Kuchak
- Kulseh-ye Olya
- Mikalabad
- Shalmash
- Varchak
- Yusef Goli
