= Rabat District =

District in West Azerbaijan province, Iran

Rabat District Persian: بخش ربط
- District
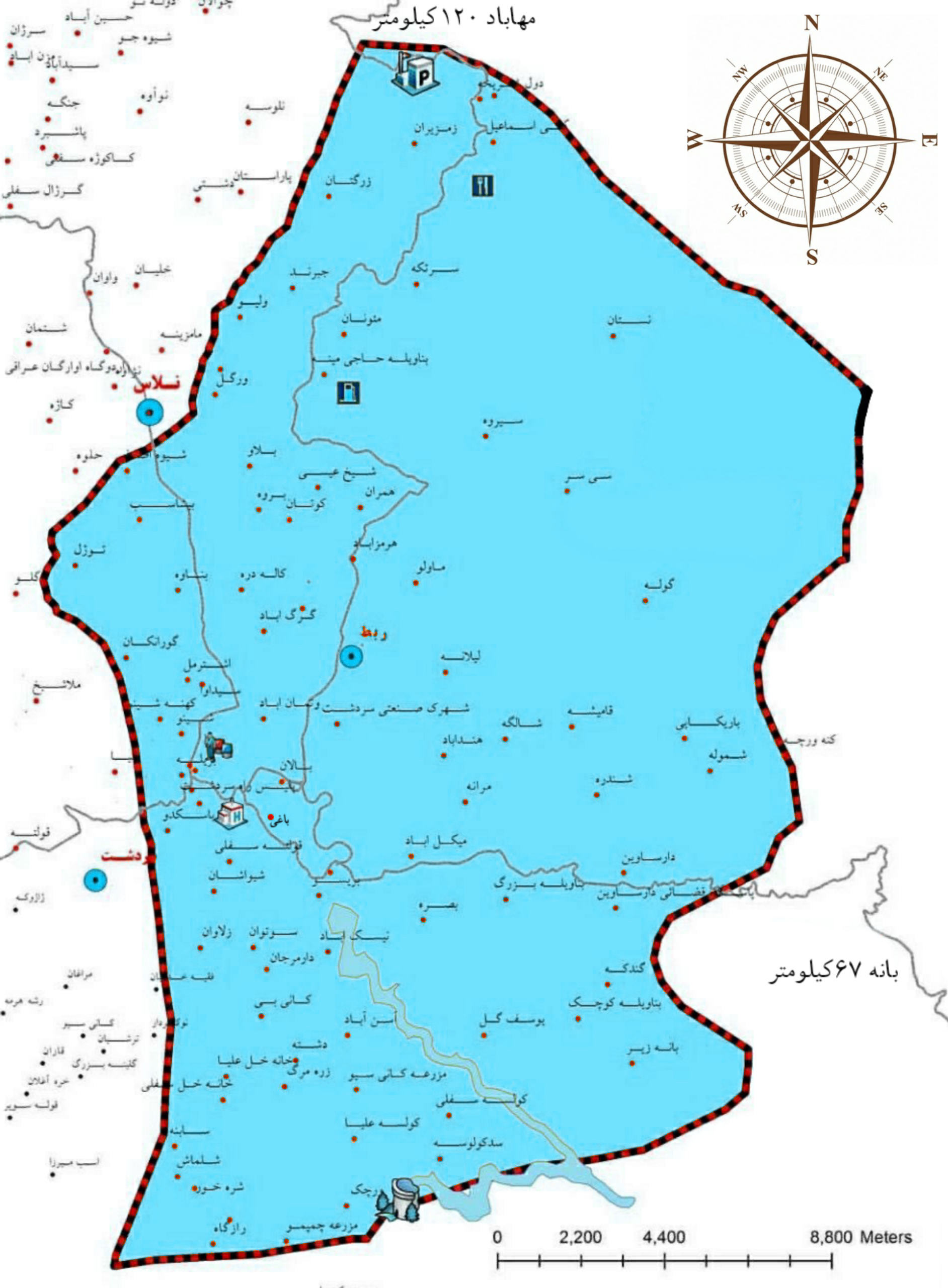
- Rabat District of Sardasht County - 2020

- Location within Iran
- Coordinates: 36°12′N 45°36′E
- Country: Iran
- Province: West Azerbaijan
- County: Sardasht
- Established: 2020
- Capital: Rabat
- Time zone: UTC+3:30 (IRST)

Rabat District (Persian: بخش ربط) is in Sardasht County, West Azerbaijan province, Iran. Its capital is the city of Rabat, whose population at the 2016 National Census was 15,750 people in 4,030 households.

== History ==
The village of Nalas was converted to a city in 2018.

In 2020, Bask-e Kuleseh and Gavork-e Sardasht Rural Districts, and the city of Rabat, were separated from the Central District in the formation of Rabat District. Nalas was transferred to Rabat District in 2022.

== Demographics ==
=== Administrative divisions ===
Rabat District
Administrative Divisions
Bask-e Kuleseh RD
Gavork-e Sardasht RD
Nalas (city)
Rabat (city)
RD = Rural District
