= Baryaji Rural District =

Rural district in West Azerbaijan province, Iran

Baryaji Rural District Persian: دهستان برياجي
- Rural District
- Location within Iran
- Coordinates: 36°10′N 45°23′E
- Country: Iran
- Province: West Azerbaijan
- County: Sardasht
- District: Central
- Established: 1987
- Capital: Beyuran-e Sofla

Population (2016)
  - Total: 11,924
- Time zone: UTC+3:30 (IRST)

Baryaji Rural District (Persian: دهستان برياجي) is in the Central District of Sardasht County, West Azerbaijan province, Iran. Its capital is the village Beyuran-e Sofla.

== Demographics ==
=== Population ===
At the time of the 2006 National Census, the rural district's population was 11,658 in 2,295 households. There were 12,382 inhabitants in 2,882 households at the following census of 2011. The 2016 census measured the population of the rural district as 11,924 in 3,159 households. The most populous of its 76 villages was Beyuran-e Sofla, with 1,309 people.

=== Other villages in the rural district ===
- Banu Khalaf
- Beyuran-e Olya
- Duleh-ye Garm
- Kur Bonav
- Maraghan
- Mir Sheykh Heydar
- Qaleh Rash
- Vardeh
- Zuran
