= Central District (Sardasht County) =

District in West Azerbaijan province, Iran

Central District (Sardasht County) Persian: بخش مرکزی شهرستان سردشت
- District
- Location within Iran
- Coordinates: 36°07′N 45°27′E
- Country: Iran
- Province: West Azerbaijan
- County: Sardasht
- Capital: Sardasht

Population (2016)
  - Total: 86,590
- Time zone: UTC+3:30 (IRST)

The Central District of Sardasht County (Persian: بخش مرکزی شهرستان سردشت) is in West Azerbaijan province, Iran. Its capital is the city of Sardasht.

== History ==
In 2020, Bask-e Kuleseh and Gavork-e Sardasht Rural Districts, and the city of Rabat, were separated from the district in the formation of Rabat District.

== Demographics ==
=== Population ===
At the time of the 2006 National Census, the district's population was 72,777 in 15,071 households. The following census in 2011 counted 80,550 people in 19,736 households. The 2016 census measured the population of the district as 86,590 inhabitants in 22,964 households.

=== Administrative divisions ===
Central District (Sardasht County) Population
Administrative Divisions	2006	2011	2016
Alan RD	4,489	4,756	4,907
Baryaji RD	11,658	12,382	11,924
Bask-e Kuleseh RD (Note: Transferred to Rabat District after the 2016 census)	6,212	5,040	4,233
Gavork-e Sardasht RD	5,316	4,137	3,364
Rabat (city)	7,987	12,068	15,750
Sardasht (city)	37,115	42,167	46,412
Total	72,777	80,550	86,590
RD = Rural District
