= Sardasht County =

County in West Azerbaijan province, Iran

Sardasht County Persian: شهرستان سردشت
- County
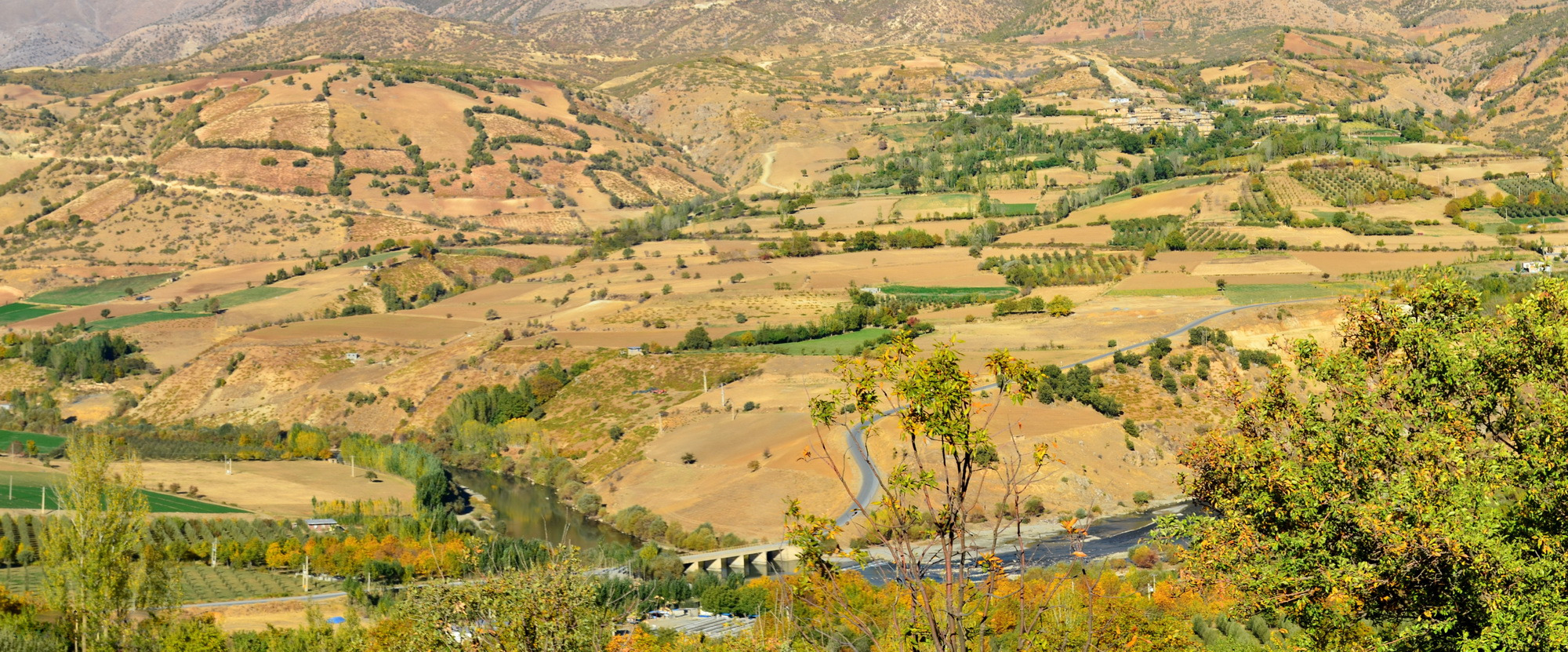
- Pranshahr–Sardasht Road

- Location of Sardasht County in West Azerbaijan province (bottom left, yellow)

- Location of West Azerbaijan province in Iran
- Coordinates: 36°10′N 45°29′E
- Country: Iran
- Province: West Azerbaijan
- Capital: Sardasht
- Districts: Central, Rabat

Population (2016)
  - Total: 118,849
- Time zone: UTC+3:30 (IRST)

Sardasht County (Persian: شهرستان سردشت) is in West Azerbaijan province, Iran. Its capital is the city of Sardasht.

== History ==
The village of Nalas was converted to a city in 2018.

In 2020, Bask-e Kuleseh and Gavork-e Sardasht Rural Districts, and the city of Rabat, were separated from the Central District in the formation of Rabat District.

In 2022, Vazineh District (Note: Renamed the Central District of Mirabad County) was separated from the county in the establishment of Mirabad County and renamed the Central District. Nalas was transferred to Rabat District.

== Demographics ==
=== Population ===
At the time of the 2006 census, the county's population was 104,146 in 20,414 households. The following census in 2011 counted 111,590 people in 26,546 households. The 2016 census measured the population of the county as 118,849 in 31,049 households.

=== Administrative divisions ===
Sardasht County's population history and administrative structure over three consecutive censuses are shown in the following table.

Sardasht County Population
| Administrative Divisions | 2006 | 2011 | 2016 |
|---|---|---|---|
| Central District | 72,777 | 80,550 | 86,590 |
| Alan RD | 4,489 | 4,756 | 4,907 |
| Baryaji RD | 11,658 | 12,382 | 11,924 |
| Bask-e Kuleseh RD | 6,212 | 5,040 | 4,233 |
| Gavork-e Sardasht RD | 5,316 | 4,137 | 3,364 |
| Rabat (city) | 7,987 | 12,068 | 15,750 |
| Sardasht (city) | 37,115 | 42,167 | 46,412 |
| Rabat District (Note: Established after the 2016 census) | | | |
| Bask-e Kuleseh RD | | | |
| Gavork-e Sardasht RD | | | |
| Nalas (city) | | | |
| Rabat (city) | | | |
| Vazineh District (Note: Transferred to Mirabad County and renamed the Central District) | 31,369 | 31,040 | 32,259 |
| Gavork-e Nalin RD | 10,682 | 10,065 | 9,958 |
| Melkari RD (Note: Renamed Melkari-ye Gharbi Rural District) | 16,185 | 15,545 | 16,301 |
| Mirabad (city) | 4,502 | 5,430 | 6,000 |
| Nalas (city) (Note: Became a city after the 2016 census) | | | |
| Total | 104,146 | 111,590 | 118,849 |
RD = Rural District

== Tourism ==
The Shalmash Falls are in Sardasht County in a green forested valley near Shalmash Village. Kani Grawan is also another popular tourist attraction in Sardasht County located near Kani Gaviz village.

== See also ==
Media related to Sardasht County at Wikimedia Commons
