= Siah Gel =

Siah Gel or Seyah Gol or Siah Gol or Siyah Gol or Seyahgel or Siahgel (Persian: سياهگل) may refer to:

- Siah Gol, Gilan
- Siah Gel, Abdanan, Ilam Province
- Siah Gel, Eyvan, Ilam Province
- Siah Gol, Kermanshah
- Siah Gol, alternate name of Siah Kol, Kermanshah Province
- Siah Gel, Khuzestan
- Siah Gel, Lorestan
- Siah Gol-e Bala, West Azerbaijan Province
- Siah Gol-e Pain, West Azerbaijan Province
- Siah Gel-e Shah Abbas
