= Quzlu =

Quzlu or Qowzlu (Persian: قوزلو) may refer to various places in Iran:

- Qowzlu, Alborz
- Quzlu, Germi, Ardabil province
- Quzlu, Anguti, Germi County, Ardabil province
- Quzlu, Kowsar, Ardabil province
- Quzlu, Bostanabad, East Azerbaijan province
- Quzlu, Malekan, East Azerbaijan province
- Quzlu-ye Bala, Kurdistan province
- Quzlu, Qazvin
- Quzlu-ye Khaneqah, West Azerbaijan province
- Qowzlu-ye Afshar, West Azerbaijan province
- Qowzlu-ye Olya, West Azerbaijan province
- Qowzlu-ye Sofla, West Azerbaijan province
- Quzlu, Zanjan
- Quzlu, Mahneshan, Zanjan province

== See also ==
- Qozlu (disambiguation), various places in Iran and Azerbaijan
