= Quzluy =

Quzluy (Persian: قوزلوي), also rendered as Qozlu, may refer to:

- Quzluy-e Afshar
- Quzluy-e Khaniyeh
- Quzluy-e Olya (disambiguation)
- Quzluy-e Sofla (disambiguation)

== See also ==
- Quzlu (disambiguation)
