= Qozlu =

Qozlu or Kozlu may refer to:

- Qozlu, Kalbajar, Azerbaijan
- Qozlu, Lachin, Azerbaijan
- Qozlu, Ardabil, Iran
- Qozlu, West Azerbaijan (disambiguation), Iran

== See also ==
- Quzlu (disambiguation), places in Iran
- Kozlu, Zonguldak, Turkey
