= Quytal =

Quytal قويطال
- Village
- Location within Iran
- Coordinates: 36°29′53″N 45°48′35″E
- Country: Iran
- Province: West Azerbaijan
- County: Mahabad
- Bakhsh: Khalifan
- Rural District: Kani Bazar

Population (2006)
  - Total: 204
- Time zone: UTC+3:30 (IRST)
  - Summer (DST): UTC+4:30 (IRDT)

Quytal (Persian: قويطال, also Romanized as Qūyţāl) is a village in Kani Bazar Rural District, Khalifan District, Mahabad County, West Azerbaijan Province, Iran. At the 2006 census, its population was 204, in 31 families.
