= Eyn Molla =

Eyn Molla عين ملا
- Village
- Location within Iran
- Coordinates: 36°36′24″N 45°47′26″E
- Country: Iran
- Province: West Azerbaijan
- County: Mahabad
- Bakhsh: Khalifan
- Rural District: Kani Bazar

Population (2006)
  - Total: 39
- Time zone: UTC+3:30 (IRST)
  - Summer (DST): UTC+4:30 (IRDT)

Eyn Molla (Persian: عين ملا, also Romanized as ‘Eyn Mollā; also known as ‘Eyn Malān) is a village in Kani Bazar Rural District, Khalifan District, Mahabad County, West Azerbaijan Province, Iran. At the 2006 census, its population was 39, in 5 families.
