= Kavis =

Kavis كاويس
- Village
- Location within Iran
- Coordinates: 36°39′35″N 45°41′12″E
- Country: Iran
- Province: West Azerbaijan
- County: Mahabad
- Bakhsh: Khalifan
- Rural District: Mangur-e Sharqi

Population (2006)
  - Total: 62 in 8 families
- Time zone: UTC+3:30 (IRST)
  - Summer (DST): UTC+4:30 (IRDT)

Kavis (Persian: كاويس, Sorani Kurdish: کاوه‌یس, also Romanized as Kāvīs and Kāweys; also known as Kāvos) is a village in Mangur-e Sharqi Rural District, Khalifan District, Mahabad County, West Azerbaijan Province, Iran. At the 2006 census, its population was 62, in 8 families.
