= Key Salan =

Key Salan كي سلان
- Village
- Location within Iran
- Coordinates: 36°28′00″N 45°33′42″E
- Country: Iran
- Province: West Azerbaijan
- County: Mahabad
- Bakhsh: Khalifan
- Rural District: Mangur-e Sharqi

Population (2006)
  - Total: 124
- Time zone: UTC+3:30 (IRST)
  - Summer (DST): UTC+4:30 (IRDT)

Key Salan (Persian: كي سلان, also Romanized as Key Salān) is a village in Mangur-e Sharqi Rural District, Khalifan District, Mahabad County, West Azerbaijan Province, Iran. At the 2006 census, its population was 124, in 16 families.
