= Gerdeh Bardan =

Gerdeh Bardan گرده بردان
- Village
- Location within Iran
- Coordinates: 36°37′38″N 45°48′04″E
- Country: Iran
- Province: West Azerbaijan
- County: Mahabad
- Bakhsh: Khalifan
- Rural District: Kani Bazar

Population (2006)
  - Total: 102
- Time zone: UTC+3:30 (IRST)
  - Summer (DST): UTC+4:30 (IRDT)

Gerdeh Bardan (Persian: گرده بردان, also Romanized as Gerdeh Bardān) is a village in Kani Bazar Rural District, Khalifan District, Mahabad County, West Azerbaijan Province, Iran. At the 2006 census, its population was 102, in 17 families.
