= Golinan =

Golinan گلينان
- Village
- Location within Iran
- Coordinates: 36°28′11″N 45°52′29″E
- Country: Iran
- Province: West Azerbaijan
- County: Mahabad
- Bakhsh: Khalifan
- Rural District: Kani Bazar

Population (2006)
  - Total: 368
- Time zone: UTC+3:30 (IRST)
  - Summer (DST): UTC+4:30 (IRDT)

Golinan (Persian: گلينان, also Romanized as Golīnān; also known as Golīnāz) is a village in Kani Bazar Rural District, Khalifan District, Mahabad County, West Azerbaijan Province, Iran. At the 2006 census, its population was 368, in 58 families.
