= Barreju =

Barreju برجو
- Village
- Location within Iran
- Coordinates: 36°34′50″N 45°49′52″E
- Country: Iran
- Province: West Azerbaijan
- County: Mahabad
- Bakhsh: Khalifan
- Rural District: Kani Bazar

Population (2006)
  - Total: 267
- Time zone: UTC+3:30 (IRST)
  - Summer (DST): UTC+4:30 (IRDT)

Barreju (Persian: برجو, also Romanized as Barrejū; also known as Barreh Jū) is a village in Kani Bazar Rural District, Khalifan District, Mahabad County, West Azerbaijan Province, Iran. At the 2006 census, its population was 267, in 36 families.
