= Kushgeh Darreh =

Kushgeh Darreh كوشگه دره
- Village
- Location within Iran
- Coordinates: 36°30′27″N 45°44′37″E
- Country: Iran
- Province: West Azerbaijan
- County: Mahabad
- Bakhsh: Khalifan
- Rural District: Kani Bazar

Population (2006)
  - Total: 233
- Time zone: UTC+3:30 (IRST)
  - Summer (DST): UTC+4:30 (IRDT)

Kushgeh Darreh (Persian: كوشگه دره, also Romanized as Kūshgeh Darreh; also known as Kosk Darreh and Kūshk Darreh) is a village in Kani Bazar Rural District, Khalifan District, Mahabad County, West Azerbaijan Province, Iran. At the 2006 census, its population was 233, in 41 families.
