= Qarah Chelan =

Qarah Chelan قره چلان
- Village
- Location within Iran
- Coordinates: 36°40′55″N 45°44′31″E
- Country: Iran
- Province: West Azerbaijan
- County: Mahabad
- Bakhsh: Khalifan
- Rural District: Mangur-e Sharqi

Population (2006)
  - Total: 46
- Time zone: UTC+3:30 (IRST)
  - Summer (DST): UTC+4:30 (IRDT)

Qarah Chelan (Persian: قره چلان, also Romanized as Qarah Chelān and Qareh Chelān) is a village in Mangur-e Sharqi Rural District, Khalifan District, Mahabad County, West Azerbaijan Province, Iran. At the 2006 census, its population was 46, in 6 families.
