= Khatunasti =

Khatunasti خاتون استی
- village
- Location within Iran
- Coordinates: 36°37′45″N 45°40′15″E
- Country: Iran
- Province: West Azerbaijan
- County: Mahabad
- Bakhsh: Khalifan
- Rural District: Mangur-e Sharqi

Population (2006)
  - Total: 47
- Time zone: UTC+3:30 (IRST)
  - Summer (DST): UTC+4:30 (IRDT)

Khatunasti (Persian: خاتون استی, also Romanized as Khātūnastī; also known as Khātūnasdī) is a village in Mangur-e Sharqi Rural District, Khalifan District, Mahabad County, West Azerbaijan Province, Iran. At the 2006 census, its population was 47, in 10 families.
