= Golyar =

Golyar گليار
- Village
- Location within Iran
- Coordinates: 36°37′39″N 45°42′25″E
- Country: Iran
- Province: West Azerbaijan
- County: Mahabad
- Bakhsh: Khalifan
- Rural District: Mangur-e Sharqi

Population (2006)
  - Total: 108
- Time zone: UTC+3:30 (IRST)
  - Summer (DST): UTC+4:30 (IRDT)

Golyar (Persian: گليار, also Romanized as Golyār) is a village in Mangur-e Sharqi Rural District, Khalifan District, Mahabad County, West Azerbaijan Province, Iran. At the 2006 census, its population was 108, in 19 families.
