= Aghasur =

Aghasur اغاسور
- Village
- Location within Iran
- Coordinates: 36°29′16″N 45°37′27″E
- Country: Iran
- Province: West Azerbaijan
- County: Mahabad
- Bakhsh: Khalifan
- Rural District: Mangur-e Sharqi

Population (2006)
  - Total: 179
- Time zone: UTC+3:30 (IRST)
  - Summer (DST): UTC+4:30 (IRDT)

Aghasur (Persian: اغاسور, also Romanized as Āghāsūr; also known as Āqā Sūr) is a village in Mangur-e Sharqi Rural District, Khalifan District, Mahabad County, West Azerbaijan province, Iran. At the 2006 census, its population was 179, in 20 families.
