= Dul Bahar =

Dul Bahar دول بهار
- Village
- Country: Iran
- Province: West Azerbaijan
- County: Mahabad
- Bakhsh: Khalifan
- Rural District: Mangur-e Sharqi

Population (2006)
  - Total: 36
- Time zone: UTC+3:30 (IRST)
  - Summer (DST): UTC+4:30 (IRDT)

Dul Bahar (Persian: دول بهار, also Romanized as Dūl Bahār) is a village in Mangur-e Sharqi Rural District, Khalifan District, Mahabad County, West Azerbaijan Province, Iran. At the 2006 census, its population was 36, in 4 families.
