= Gowmelian =

Gowmelian گومليان
- Village
- Location within Iran
- Coordinates: 36°33′53″N 45°33′37″E
- Country: Iran
- Province: West Azerbaijan
- County: Mahabad
- Bakhsh: Khalifan
- Rural District: Mangur-e Sharqi

Population (2006)
  - Total: 141
- Time zone: UTC+3:30 (IRST)
  - Summer (DST): UTC+4:30 (IRDT)

Gowmelian (Persian: گومليان, also Romanized as Gowmelīān; also known as Gomelyan, Gowmelān, Gūmeyan, Gūmlīān, and Komlīān) is a village in Mangur-e Sharqi Rural District, Khalifan District, Mahabad County, West Azerbaijan Province, Iran. At the 2006 census, its population was 141, in 25 families.
