= Benguin =

Benguin بنگوين
- Village
- Location within Iran
- Coordinates: 36°33′29″N 45°31′12″E
- Country: Iran
- Province: West Azerbaijan
- County: Mahabad
- Bakhsh: Khalifan
- Rural District: Mangur-e Sharqi

Population (2006)
  - Total: 165
- Time zone: UTC+3:30 (IRST)
  - Summer (DST): UTC+4:30 (IRDT)

Benguin (Persian: بنگوين, also Romanized as Bengūīn) is a village in Mangur-e Sharqi Rural District, Khalifan District, Mahabad County, West Azerbaijan Province, Iran. At the 2006 census, its population was 164, in 27 families.
