= Hajji Mamian =

Hajji Mamian Hajji Mamian (حاجي ماميان)
- Village
- Location within Iran
- Coordinates: 36°41′03″N 45°39′48″E
- Country: Iran
- Province: West Azerbaijan
- County: Mahabad
- Bakhsh: Khalifan
- Rural District: Mangur-e Sharqi

Population (2006)
  - Total: 179
- Time zone: UTC+3:30 (IRST)
  - Summer (DST): UTC+4:30 (IRDT)

Hajji Mamian (Persian: حاجي ماميان, also Romanized as Ḩājjī Māmīān, Ḩājjī Mā Mīān, and Ḩājjī Mamiyan) is a village in Mangur-e Sharqi Rural District, Khalifan District, Mahabad County, West Azerbaijan Province, Iran. At the 2006 census, its population was 179, in 21 families.
