= Gerd-e Shilan =

Gerd-e Shilan گردشيلان
- Village
- Location within Iran
- Coordinates: 36°18′55″N 45°42′35″E
- Country: Iran
- Province: West Azerbaijan
- County: Mahabad
- Bakhsh: Khalifan
- Rural District: Kani Bazar

Population (2006)
  - Total: 210
- Time zone: UTC+3:30 (IRST)
  - Summer (DST): UTC+4:30 (IRDT)

Gerd-e Shilan (Persian: گردشيلان, also Romanized as Gerd-e Shīlān) is a village in Kani Bazar Rural District, Khalifan District, Mahabad County, West Azerbaijan Province, Iran. At the 2006 census, its population was 210, in 33 families.
