= Il-e Teymur =

Il-e Teymur ايل تيمور
- Village
- Location within Iran
- Coordinates: 36°30′05″N 45°47′05″E
- Country: Iran
- Province: West Azerbaijan
- County: Mahabad
- Bakhsh: Khalifan
- Rural District: Kani Bazar

Population (2006)
  - Total: 163
- Time zone: UTC+3:30 (IRST)
  - Summer (DST): UTC+4:30 (IRDT)

Il-e Teymur (Persian: ايل تيمور, also romanized as Īl-e Teymūr) is a village in Kani Bazar Rural District, Khalifan District, Mahabad County, West Azerbaijan Province, Iran. At the 2006 census, its population was 163, in 27 families.
