= Kani Rash =

Kani Rash or Kani Resh (Persian: كاني رش) may refer to:

- Kani Rash, Kermanshah
- Kani Rash, Bukan, West Azerbaijan Province
- Kani Rash, Mahabad, West Azerbaijan Province
- Kani Rash, Oshnavieh, West Azerbaijan Province
- Kani Rash, Sardasht, West Azerbaijan Province
- Kani Rash, Urmia, West Azerbaijan Province
