= Kohneh Deh Shugai =

Kohneh Deh Shugai كهنه ده شوگاي
- Village
- Country: Iran
- Province: West Azerbaijan
- County: Mahabad
- Bakhsh: Khalifan
- Rural District: Kani Bazar

Population (2006)
  - Total: 172
- Time zone: UTC+3:30 (IRST)
  - Summer (DST): UTC+4:30 (IRDT)

Kohneh Deh Shugai (Persian: كهنه ده شوگاي, also Romanized as Kohneh Deh Shūgāī) is a village in Kani Bazar Rural District, Khalifan District, Mahabad County, West Azerbaijan Province, Iran. At the 2006 census, its population was 172, in 22 families.
