= Zendeh Qul =

Zendeh Qul زنده قول
- Village
- Location within Iran
- Coordinates: 36°25′18″N 45°44′39″E
- Country: Iran
- Province: West Azerbaijan
- County: Mahabad
- Bakhsh: Khalifan
- Rural District: Kani Bazar

Population (2006)
  - Total: 208
- Time zone: UTC+3:30 (IRST)
  - Summer (DST): UTC+4:30 (IRDT)

Zendeh Qul (Persian: زنده قول, also Romanized as Zendeh Qūl; also known as Zendeh Ghūl) is a village in Kani Bazar Rural District, Khalifan District, Mahabad County, West Azerbaijan Province, Iran. At the 2006 census, its population was 208 with 27 families.
