= Giah Dowran =

Giah Dowran گياه دوران
- Village
- Location within Iran
- Coordinates: 36°38′59″N 45°44′19″E
- Country: Iran
- Province: West Azerbaijan
- County: Mahabad
- Bakhsh: Khalifan
- Rural District: Mangur-e Sharqi

Population (2006)
  - Total: 225
- Time zone: UTC+3:30 (IRST)
  - Summer (DST): UTC+4:30 (IRDT)

Giah Dowran (Persian: گياه دوران, also Romanized as Gīāh Darvān, Gīāh Dowrān, and Gīyāh Dowrān) is a village in Mangur-e Sharqi Rural District, Khalifan District, Mahabad County, West Azerbaijan Province, Iran. At the 2006 census, its population was 225, in 26 families.
