= Sheykh Yusof =

Sheykh Yusof شيخ يوسف
- Village
- Location within Iran
- Coordinates: 36°32′01″N 45°48′12″E
- Country: Iran
- Province: West Azerbaijan
- County: Mahabad
- Bakhsh: Khalifan
- Rural District: Kani Bazar

Population (2006)
  - Total: 95
- Time zone: UTC+3:30 (IRST)
  - Summer (DST): UTC+4:30 (IRDT)

Sheykh Yusof (Persian: شيخ يوسف, also Romanized as Sheykh Yūsof) is a village in Kani Bazar Rural District, Khalifan District, Mahabad County, West Azerbaijan Province, Iran. At the 2006 census, its population was 95, in 14 families.
