= Miriseh =

Village in West Azerbaijan province, Iran

Miriseh Persian: ميري سه
- Village
- Location within Iran
- Coordinates: 36°29′50″N 45°33′59″E
- Country: Iran
- Province: West Azerbaijan
- County: Mahabad
- District: Khalifan
- Rural District: Mangur-e Sharqi

Population (2016)
  - Total: 228
- Time zone: UTC+3:30 (IRST)

Miriseh (Persian: ميري سه) (Note: Also romanized as Mīrīseh) is a village in Mangur-e Sharqi Rural District of Khalifan District in Mahabad County, West Azerbaijan province, Iran.

== Demographics ==
=== Population ===
At the time of the 2006 National Census, the village's population was 268 in 35 households. The following census in 2011 counted 226 people in 46 households. The 2016 census measured the population of the village as 228 people in 39 households.
