= Salm, West Azerbaijan =

Village in West Azerbaijan province, Iran

Salm Persian: سلم
- Village
- Location within Iran
- Coordinates: 36°37′25″N 45°34′44″E
- Country: Iran
- Province: West Azerbaijan
- County: Mahabad
- District: Khalifan
- Rural District: Mangur-e Sharqi

Population (2016)
  - Total: 188
- Time zone: UTC+3:30 (IRST)

Salm (Persian: سلم) (Note: Also known as Salīm) is a village in Mangur-e Sharqi Rural District of Khalifan District in Mahabad County, West Azerbaijan province, Iran.

== Demographics ==
=== Population ===
At the time of the 2006 National Census, the village's population was 231 in 44 households. The following census in 2011 counted 220 people in 39 households. The 2016 census measured the population of the village as 188 people in 37 households.
