= Kavelan =

Kavelan or Kavlan (Persian: كاولان) may refer to:

- Kavelan-e Olya
- Kavelan-e Sofla
