= Qalui Zendan =

Village in West Azerbaijan province, Iran

Qalui Zendan Persian: قالوي زندان
- Village
- Location within Iran
- Coordinates: 36°25′31″N 45°50′12″E
- Country: Iran
- Province: West Azerbaijan
- County: Mahabad
- District: Khalifan
- Rural District: Kani Bazar

Population (2016)
  - Total: 322
- Time zone: UTC+3:30 (IRST)

Qalui Zendan (Persian: قالوي زندان) (Note: Also romanized as Qālūī Zendān; also known as Qālū Zendān) is a village in Kani Bazar Rural District of Khalifan District in Mahabad County, West Azerbaijan province, Iran.

== Demographics ==
=== Population ===
At the time of the 2006 National Census, the village's population was 438 in 63 households. The following census in 2011 counted 367 people in 64 households. The 2016 census measured the population of the village as 322 people in 64 households.
