= Kitekeh =

Village in West Azerbaijan province, Iran

Kitekeh Persian: كيتكه
- Village
- Location within Iran
- Coordinates: 36°31′19″N 45°45′06″E
- Country: Iran
- Province: West Azerbaijan
- County: Mahabad
- District: Khalifan
- Rural District: Kani Bazar

Population (2016)
  - Total: 297
- Time zone: UTC+3:30 (IRST)

Kitekeh (Persian: كيتكه) (Note: Also romanized as Kītekeh; also known as Ketekeh) is a village in, and the capital of, Kani Bazar Rural District in Khalifan District of Mahabad County, West Azerbaijan province, Iran.

== Demographics ==
=== Population ===
At the time of the 2006 National Census, the village's population was 291 in 36 households. The following census in 2011 counted 337 people in 57 households. The 2016 census measured the population of the village as 297 people in 63 households.
