= Maraneh, Mahabad =

Village in West Azerbaijan province, Iran

Maraneh Persian: مرانه
- Village
- Location within Iran
- Coordinates: 36°32′47″N 45°34′50″E
- Country: Iran
- Province: West Azerbaijan
- County: Mahabad
- District: Khalifan
- Rural District: Mangur-e Sharqi

Population (2016)
  - Total: 197
- Time zone: UTC+3:30 (IRST)

Maraneh (Persian: مرانه) (Note: Also romanized as Marāneh) is a village in Mangur-e Sharqi Rural District of Khalifan District in Mahabad County, West Azerbaijan province, Iran.

== Demographics ==
=== Population ===
At the time of the 2006 National Census, the village's population was 269 in 56 households. The following census in 2011 counted 242 people in 61 households. The 2016 census measured the population of the village as 197 people in 39 households.
