= Pir Mikail, West Azerbaijan =

Pir Mikail پيرميكاييل
- Village
- Location within Iran
- Coordinates: 36°35′23″N 45°47′37″E
- Country: Iran
- Province: West Azerbaijan
- County: Mahabad
- Bakhsh: Khalifan
- Rural District: Kani Bazar

Population (2006)
  - Total: 111
- Time zone: UTC+3:30 (IRST)
  - Summer (DST): UTC+4:30 (IRDT)

Pir Mikail (Persian: پيرميكاييل, also Romanized as Pīr Mīkā’īl; also known as Pīr Mekā’īl) is a village in the Kani Bazar Rural District, Khalifan District, Mahabad County, West Azerbaijan Province, Iran. As of the 2006 census, its population was 111, in 17 families.
