= Kuran, Mahabad =

Village in West Azerbaijan province, Iran

Kuran Persian: كوران
- Village
- Location within Iran
- Coordinates: 36°24′42″N 45°38′43″E
- Country: Iran
- Province: West Azerbaijan
- County: Mahabad
- District: Khalifan
- Rural District: Kani Bazar

Population (2016)
  - Total: 316
- Time zone: UTC+3:30 (IRST)

Kuran (Persian: كوران) (Note: Also romanized as Kūrān) is a village in Kani Bazar Rural District of Khalifan District in Mahabad County, West Azerbaijan province, Iran.

== Demographics ==
=== Population ===
At the time of the 2006 National Census, the village's population was 364 in 57 households. The following census in 2011 counted 366 people in 57 households. The 2016 census measured the population of the village as 316 people in 91 households.
