= Mazhgeh =

Village in West Azerbaijan province, Iran

Mazhgeh Persian: ماژگه
- Village
- Location within Iran
- Coordinates: 36°20′02″N 45°44′07″E
- Country: Iran
- Province: West Azerbaijan
- County: Mahabad
- District: Khalifan
- Rural District: Kani Bazar

Population (2016)
  - Total: 285
- Time zone: UTC+3:30 (IRST)

Mazhgeh (Persian: ماژگه) (Note: Also romanized as Māzhgeh) is a village in Kani Bazar Rural District of Khalifan District in Mahabad County, West Azerbaijan province, Iran.

== Demographics ==
=== Population ===
At the time of the 2006 National Census, the village's population was 491 in 70 households. The following census in 2011 counted 368 people in 76 households. The 2016 census measured the population of the village as 285 people in 75 households.
