= Qeshquneh-ye Olya =

Qeshquneh-ye Olya قشقونه عليا
- Village
- Location within Iran
- Coordinates: 36°39′05″N 45°32′15″E
- Country: Iran
- Province: West Azerbaijan
- County: Mahabad
- Bakhsh: Khalifan
- Rural District: Mangur-e Sharqi

Population (2006)
  - Total: 62
- Time zone: UTC+3:30 (IRST)
  - Summer (DST): UTC+4:30 (IRDT)

Qeshquneh-ye Olya (Persian: قشقونه عليا, also Romanized as Qeshqūneh-ye ‘Olyā; also known as Qeshqeneh-ye ‘Olyā) is a village in Mangur-e Sharqi Rural District, Khalifan District, Mahabad County, West Azerbaijan Province, Iran. At the 2006 census, its population was 62, in 6 families.
