= Jandaran =

Village in West Azerbaijan province, Iran

Jandaran Persian: جانداران
- Village
- Location within Iran
- Coordinates: 36°25′00″N 45°31′04″E
- Country: Iran
- Province: West Azerbaijan
- County: Mahabad
- District: Khalifan
- Rural District: Mangur-e Sharqi

Population (2016)
  - Total: 188
- Time zone: UTC+3:30 (IRST)

Jandaran (Persian: جانداران) (Note: Also romanized as Jāndārān) is a village in Mangur-e Sharqi Rural District of Khalifan District in Mahabad County, West Azerbaijan province, Iran.

== Demographics ==
=== Population ===
At the time of the 2006 National Census, the village's population was 222 in 31 households. The following census in 2011 counted 189 people in 31 households. The 2016 census measured the population of the village as 188 people in 33 households.
