= Qeshquneh-ye Sofla =

Qeshquneh-ye Sofla قشقونه سفلی
- village
- Location within Iran
- Coordinates: 36°38′38″N 45°32′38″E
- Country: Iran
- Province: West Azerbaijan
- County: Mahabad
- Bakhsh: Khalifan
- Rural District: Mangur-e Sharqi

Population (2006)
  - Total: 65
- Time zone: UTC+3:30 (IRST)
  - Summer (DST): UTC+4:30 (IRDT)

Qeshquneh-ye Sofla (Persian: قشقونه سفلی, also Romanized as Qeshqūneh-ye Soflá; also known as Qeshqeneh-ye Soflá) is a village in Mangur-e Sharqi Rural District, Khalifan District, Mahabad County, West Azerbaijan Province, Iran. At the 2006 census, its population was 65, in 7 families.
