= Abdulrahman Fattahi =

Kurdish Sunni cleric from Iran

Abdulrahman Fattahi (Persian: عبدالرحمان فتاحی; Kurdish: عەبدوڕەحمان فەتاحی, romanized: Ebduřeḧman Fettaḧî), also known by his nom de guerre Abu Safiya al-Kurdi (Arabic: أَبُوْ صَفِيَّةُ ٱلْكُرْدِيّْ), was a Kurdish Sunni cleric from Iran. He was a member of Al-Nusra Front and later Hay'at Tahrir al-Sham. After the Fall of the Assad regime, he was appointed as the advisor for Iranian affairs. He was the first Kurd to hold a Syrian governmental position after the dissolution of Ba'athist Syria.

== Biography ==
Fattahi was born in the early 1950s in Sulgheh, a village near Mahabad in Iranian Kurdistan. In the 1970s, he travelled to Iraqi Kurdistan and began his studies under Abdulqadir Tawhidi. While completing his studies, Fattahi was a member of the Kurdistan Islamic Movement of Osman Abdulaziz, and lived in the Islamic Emirate of Kurdistan. Fattahi completed his studies in 1996, afterwards he returned to Iran and earned his clerical license from Shafi Burhani, and became the imam of Khalifan, Mahabad. In Iran, he was arrested for ties to the Kurdistan Brigades, and detained numerous other times. In 2011, he was sentenced to three years in Gohardasht Prison. After his release in 2014, he left for Syria. Around 3,000 Islamist Kurds had travelled to Syria at that time, and were divided between Ansar al-Islam and the Islamic State. However, Fattahi took a different route and joined Al-Nusra Front. Fattahi founded the "Sunni Muhajireen Movement of Iran", which was a predominantly Kurdish group within Al-Nusra Front. There were around 300 Kurds in Al-Nusra Front before its disbandment.

Fattahi accompanied Ahmed al-Sharaa after his split with Al-Qaeda and creation of Hay'at Tahrir al-Sham. Throughout the Syrian civil war, Fattahi lived in Idlib, where he served as a Sharia judge. After the fall of the Assad regime, he was appointed by Ahmed al-Sharaa as his deputy and advisor for Iranian affairs, becoming the first Kurd to hold a position in the new Syrian government. Fattahi later gave a speech in Kurdish at the Umayyad Mosque, where he wished for the "freedom of Jerusalem" after Syria, and threatened the Iranian government. His usage of Kurdish in public drew much attention due to the restrictions under the Assad regime.

It was reported that Fattahi died in the July 2025 Israeli airstrikes on Damascus. Later in 2025, Iranian sources claimed he had been one of the top recruiters in Iran for Salafi jihadist groups.
