= Uzuntash =

Village in West Azerbaijan province, Iran

Uzuntash Persian: اوزون تاش
- Village
- Location within Iran
- Coordinates: 36°27′10″N 45°48′15″E
- Country: Iran
- Province: West Azerbaijan
- County: Mahabad
- District: Khalifan
- Rural District: Kani Bazar

Population (2016)
  - Total: 293
- Time zone: UTC+3:30 (IRST)

Uzuntash (Persian: اوزون تاش) (Note: Also romanized as Ūzūntāsh; also known as Azūtāsh and Ozūntāsh) is a village in Kani Bazar Rural District of Khalifan District in Mahabad County, West Azerbaijan province, Iran.

== Demographics ==
=== Population ===
At the time of the 2006 National Census, the village's population was 371 in 45 households. The following census in 2011 counted 313 people in 51 households. The 2016 census measured the population of the village as 293 people in 87 households.
