= Siaqul =

Siaqul (Persian: سياقول) may refer to:

- Siaqul-e Olya
- Siaqul-e Sofla
