= Amid, West Azerbaijan =

Village in West Azerbaijan province, Iran

Amid Persian: اميد
- Village
- Location within Iran
- Coordinates: 36°34′48″N 45°39′29″E
- Country: Iran
- Province: West Azerbaijan
- County: Mahabad
- District: Khalifan
- Rural District: Mangur-e Sharqi

Population (2016)
  - Total: 251
- Time zone: UTC+3:30 (IRST)

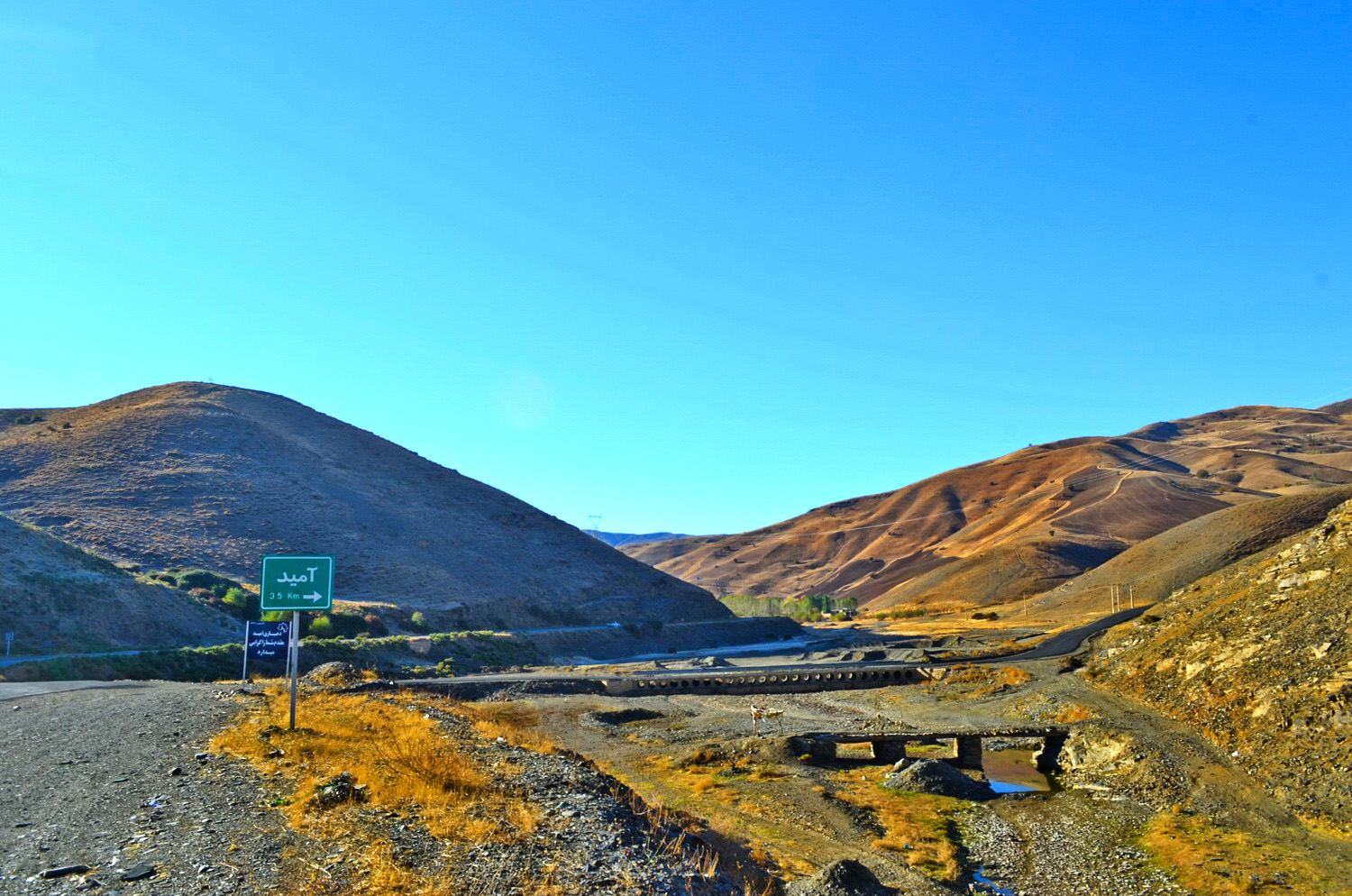

Amid (Persian: اميد) (Note: Also romanized as ‘Amīd and Āmīd; also known as Ḩamīd) is a village in Mangur-e Sharqi Rural District of Khalifan District in Mahabad County, West Azerbaijan province, Iran.

== Demographics ==
=== Population ===
At the time of the 2006 National Census, the village's population was 326 in 52 households. The following census in 2011 counted 270 people in 54 households. The 2016 census measured the population of the village as 251 people in 72 households.
