= Savinas =

Village in West Azerbaijan province, Iran

Savinas Persian: سويناس
- Village
- Location within Iran
- Coordinates: 36°21′39″N 45°42′37″E
- Country: Iran
- Province: West Azerbaijan
- County: Mahabad
- District: Khalifan
- Rural District: Kani Bazar

Population (2016)
  - Total: 288
- Time zone: UTC+3:30 (IRST)

Savinas (Persian: سويناس) (Note: Also romanized as Savīnās and Sūynās; also known as Sūnīās and Sūnīyās) is a village in Kani Bazar Rural District of Khalifan District in Mahabad County, West Azerbaijan province, Iran.

== Demographics ==
=== Population ===
At the time of the 2006 National Census, the village's population was 394 in 62 households. The following census in 2011 counted 372 people in 64 households. The 2016 census measured the population of the village as 288 people in 79 households.
