= Gagosh =

Gagosh (Persian: گاگش), also rendered as Gakosh, may refer to:

- Gagosh-e Olya
- Gagosh-e Sofla
