= Beytas =

Village in West Azerbaijan province, Iran

Beytas Persian: بيطاس
- Village
- Location within Iran
- Coordinates: 36°40′37″N 45°41′49″E
- Country: Iran
- Province: West Azerbaijan
- County: Mahabad
- District: Khalifan
- Rural District: Mangur-e Sharqi

Population (2016)
  - Total: 198
- Time zone: UTC+3:30 (IRST)

Beytas (Persian: بيطاس) (Note: Also romanized as Beyţās) is a village in Mangur-e Sharqi Rural District of Khalifan District in Mahabad County, West Azerbaijan province, Iran.

== Demographics ==
=== Population ===
At the time of the 2006 National Census, the village's population was 286 in 38 households. The following census in 2011 counted 216 people in 37 households. The 2016 census measured the population of the village as 198 people in 39 households.
