= Bagerdan =

Bagerdan (Persian: باگردان) may refer to:

- Bagerdan-e Olya
- Bagerdan-e Sofla
