= Hamzehabad, Mahabad =

Village in West Azerbaijan province, Iran

Hamzehabad Persian: حمزه آباد
- Village
- Location within Iran
- Coordinates: 36°43′01″N 45°41′28″E
- Country: Iran
- Province: West Azerbaijan
- County: Mahabad
- District: Khalifan
- Rural District: Mangur-e Sharqi

Population (2016)
  - Total: 469
- Time zone: UTC+3:30 (IRST)

Hamzehabad (Persian: حمزه آباد) (Note: Also romanized as Ḩamzehābād) is a village in, and the former capital of, Mangur-e Sharqi Rural District in Khalifan District of Mahabad County, West Azerbaijan province, Iran. The capital of the rural district has been transferred to the village of Abdollah Kordeh.

== Demographics ==
=== Population ===
At the time of the 2006 National Census, the village's population was 495 in 84 households, when it was in Mokriyan-e Gharbi Rural District of the Central District. The following census in 2011 counted 477 people in 98 households, by which time it had been transferred to Mangur-e Sharqi Rural District of Khalifan District. The 2016 census measured the population of the village as 469 people in 128 households. It was the most populous village in its rural district.
