= Kani Sib, Mahabad =

Village in West Azerbaijan province, Iran

Kani Sib Persian: كاني سيب
- Village
- Location within Iran
- Coordinates: 36°27′26″N 45°49′51″E
- Country: Iran
- Province: West Azerbaijan
- County: Mahabad
- District: Khalifan
- Rural District: Kani Bazar

Population (2016)
  - Total: 380
- Time zone: UTC+3:30 (IRST)

Kani Sib (Persian: كاني سيب) (Note: Also romanized as Kānī Sīb) is a village in Kani Bazar Rural District of Khalifan District in Mahabad County, West Azerbaijan province, Iran.

== Demographics ==
=== Population ===
At the time of the 2006 National Census, the village's population was 470 in 76 households. The following census in 2011 counted 453 people in 88 households. The 2016 census measured the population of the village as 380 people in 123 households. It was the most populous village in its rural district.
