= Bagerdan-e Olya =

Bagerdan-e Olya باگردان عليا
- Village
- Location within Iran
- Coordinates: 36°36′31″N 45°33′01″E
- Country: Iran
- Province: West Azerbaijan
- County: Mahabad
- Bakhsh: Khalifan
- Rural District: Mangur-e Sharqi

Population (2006)
  - Total: 117
- Time zone: UTC+3:30 (IRST)
  - Summer (DST): UTC+4:30 (IRDT)

Bagerdan-e Olya (Persian: باگردان عليا, also Romanized as Bāgerdān-e ‘Olyā; also known as Bāgerdān) is a village in Mangur-e Sharqi Rural District, Khalifan District, Mahabad County, West Azerbaijan Province, Iran. As of the 2006 census, its population was 117, consisting of 23 families.
