= Pir Mikayil =

Pir Mikayil or Pir Mikail (Persian: پيرميكاييل) may refer to:

- Pir Mikayil, Kermanshah
- Pir Mikail, West Azerbaijan
