= Abdollah Kordeh =

Village in West Azerbaijan province, Iran

Abdollah Kordeh Persian: عبداله كرده
- Village
- Location within Iran
- Coordinates: 36°39′25″N 45°42′26″E
- Country: Iran
- Province: West Azerbaijan
- County: Mahabad
- District: Khalifan
- Rural District: Mangur-e Sharqi

Population (2016)
  - Total: 109
- Time zone: UTC+3:30 (IRST)

Abdollah Kordeh (Persian: عبداله كرده) (Note: Also romanized as ‘Abdollāh Kordeh) is a village in, and the capital of, Mangur-e Sharqi Rural District in Khalifan District of Mahabad County, West Azerbaijan province, Iran. The previous capital of the rural district was the village of Hamzehabad.

== Demographics ==
=== Population ===
At the time of the 2006 National Census, the village's population was 95 in 13 households. The following census in 2011 counted 82 people in 15 households. The 2016 census measured the population of the village as 109 people in 25 households.
