= Qeshquneh =

Qeshquneh (Persian: قشقونه), also rendered as Qeshqeneh, may refer to:

- Qeshquneh-ye Olya
- Qeshquneh-ye Sofla
