= Gagosh-e Olya =

Gagosh-e Olya گاگش عليا
- Village
- Location within Iran
- Coordinates: 36°28′40″N 45°29′55″E
- Country: Iran
- Province: West Azerbaijan
- County: Mahabad
- Bakhsh: Khalifan
- Rural District: Mangur-e Sharqi

Population (2006)
  - Total: 308
- Time zone: UTC+3:30 (IRST)
  - Summer (DST): UTC+4:30 (IRDT)

Gagosh-e Olya (Persian: گاگش عليا, also Romanized as Gāgosh-e ‘Olyā; also known as Gākosh-e ‘Olyā) is a village in Mangur-e Sharqi Rural District, Khalifan District, Mahabad County, West Azerbaijan Province, Iran. At the 2006 census, its population was 308 in 51 families.
