= Siaqul-e Sofla =

Siaqul-e Sofla سیاقول سفلی
- village
- Location within Iran
- Coordinates: 36°39′44″N 45°38′53″E
- Country: Iran
- Province: West Azerbaijan
- County: Mahabad
- Bakhsh: Khalifan
- Rural District: Mangur-e Sharqi

Population (2006)
  - Total: 142
- Time zone: UTC+3:30 (IRST)
  - Summer (DST): UTC+4:30 (IRDT)

Siaqul-e Sofla (Persian: سیاقول سفلی, also Romanized as Sīāqūl-e Soflá; also known as Sīāh Gol-e Pā’īn) is a village in Mangur-e Sharqi Rural District, Khalifan District, Mahabad County, West Azerbaijan Province, Iran. At the 2006 census, its population was 142, in 22 families.
