= Gagosh-e Sofla =

Village in West Azerbaijan province, Iran

Gagosh-e Sofla Persian: گاگش سفلي
- Village
- Location within Iran
- Coordinates: 36°27′54″N 45°30′41″E
- Country: Iran
- Province: West Azerbaijan
- County: Mahabad
- District: Khalifan
- Rural District: Mangur-e Sharqi

Population (2016)
  - Total: 192
- Time zone: UTC+3:30 (IRST)

Gagosh-e Sofla (Persian: گاگش سفلي) (Note: Also romanized as Gāgosh-e Soflá) is a village in Mangur-e Sharqi Rural District of Khalifan District in Mahabad County, West Azerbaijan province, Iran.

== Demographics ==
=== Population ===
At the time of the 2006 National Census, the village's population was 289 in 46 households. The following census in 2011 counted 227 people in 42 households. The 2016 census measured the population of the village as 192 people in 39 households.
