= Kani Rash, Mahabad =

Village in West Azerbaijan province, Iran

Kani Rash Persian: كاني رش
- Village
- Location within Iran
- Coordinates: 36°21′08″N 45°39′18″E
- Country: Iran
- Province: West Azerbaijan
- County: Mahabad
- District: Khalifan
- Rural District: Kani Bazar

Population (2016)
  - Total: 308
- Time zone: UTC+3:30 (IRST)

Kani Rash (Persian: كاني رش) (Note: Also romanized as Kānī Rash) is a village in Kani Bazar Rural District of Khalifan District in Mahabad County, West Azerbaijan province, Iran.

== Demographics ==
=== Population ===
At the time of the 2006 National Census, the village's population was 355 in 54 households. The following census in 2011 counted 352 people in 64 households. The 2016 census measured the population of the village as 308 people in 88 households.
