= Quzluy-e Sofla =

Quzluy-e Sofla (Persian: قوزلوي سفلي), also known as Qowzlu-ye Pain may refer to:

- Quzluy-e Sofla, Mahabad
- Quzluy-e Sofla, Shahin Dezh
