= Kavelan-e Sofla =

Village in West Azerbaijan province, Iran

Kavelan-e Sofla Persian: كاولان سفلي
- Village
- Location within Iran
- Coordinates: 36°23′43″N 45°40′27″E
- Country: Iran
- Province: West Azerbaijan
- County: Mahabad
- District: Khalifan
- Rural District: Kani Bazar

Population (2016)
  - Total: 321
- Time zone: UTC+3:30 (IRST)

Kavelan-e Sofla (Persian: كاولان سفلي) (Note: Also romanized as Kāvelān-e Soflá; also known as Kāvlān) is a village in Kani Bazar Rural District of Khalifan District in Mahabad County, West Azerbaijan province, Iran.

== Demographics ==
=== Population ===
At the time of the 2006 National Census, the village's population was 378 in 63 households. The following census in 2011 counted 376 people in 97 households. The 2016 census measured the population of the village as 321 people in 90 households.
