= Afan =

Afan may refer to:

- Afan, Iran, a village in Mangur-e Sharqi Rural District, Khalifan District, Mahabad County, West Azerbaijan Province, Iran
- River Afan or Avon or Avan, a river in southwest Wales
- Saint Afan (Welsh: Sant Afan Buellt), Welsh bishop and saint of the 6th century
- The Lords of Afan, Lordship in Wales
- Afan, a previous name of the District of Port Talbot
