= Berava =

Berava may refer to:

- Berava (people), a social group or caste in Sri Lanka
- Berava (river), a river in eastern Croatia
- Berava, Iran, a village in West Azerbaijan Province, Iran
