= Siaqul-e Olya =

Siaqul-e Olya سياقول عليا
- Village
- Location within Iran
- Coordinates: 36°37′34″N 45°37′57″E
- Country: Iran
- Province: West Azerbaijan
- County: Mahabad
- Bakhsh: Khalifan
- Rural District: Mangur-e Sharqi

Population (2006)
  - Total: 126
- Time zone: UTC+3:30 (IRST)
  - Summer (DST): UTC+4:30 (IRDT)

Siaqul-e Olya (Persian: سياقول عليا, also Romanized as Sīāqūl-e ‘Olyā; also known as Sīāh Gol-e Bālā and Sīāqūl) is a village in Mangur-e Sharqi Rural District, Khalifan District, Mahabad County, West Azerbaijan Province, Iran. At the 2006 census, its population was 126, in 15 families.
