= Quzluy-e Olya =

Quzluy-e Olya (Persian: قوزلوي عليا), also known as Qowzlu-ye Bala, may refer to:

- Quzluy-e Olya, Mahabad
- Quzluy-e Olya, Shahin Dezh
