= Quzluy-e Olya, Mahabad =

Village in West Azerbaijan province, Iran

Quzluy-e Olya Persian: قوزلوي عليا
- Village
- Location within Iran
- Coordinates: 36°28′02″N 45°40′01″E
- Country: Iran
- Province: West Azerbaijan
- County: Mahabad
- District: Khalifan
- Rural District: Kani Bazar

Population (2016)
  - Total: 347
- Time zone: UTC+3:30 (IRST)

Quzluy-e Olya (Persian: قوزلوي عليا) (Note: Also romanized as Qūzlūy-e ‘Olyā; also known as Kozlu-Giaria, Qowzlū-ye Bālā, Qowzlū-ye ‘Olyā, Qozlū, and Qūzlū) is a village in Kani Bazar Rural District of Khalifan District in Mahabad County, West Azerbaijan province, Iran.

== Demographics ==
=== Population ===
At the time of the 2006 National Census, the village's population was 402 in 68 households. The following census in 2011 counted 347 people in 56 households. The 2016 census measured the population of the village as 347 people in 98 households.
