= Kani Rash, Sardasht =

Kani Rash كاني رش
- Village
- Location within Iran
- Coordinates: 36°08′25″N 45°26′12″E
- Country: Iran
- Province: West Azerbaijan
- County: Sardasht
- Bakhsh: Central
- Rural District: Baryaji

Population (2006)
  - Total: 148
- Time zone: UTC+3:30 (IRST)
  - Summer (DST): UTC+4:30 (IRDT)

Kani Rash (Kurdish: کانیه‌ ره‌ش = Kurdish: کارنیه‌ ره‌ش, also Romanized as Kānī Rash) is a village in Baryaji Rural District, in the Central District of Sardash County, West Azerbaijan Province, Iran. At the 2006 census, its population was 148, in 27 families.
