= Khalifan, Mahabad =

City in West Azerbaijan province, Iran

Khalifan Persian: خلیفان
- City
- Location within Iran
- Coordinates: 36°30′27″N 45°47′50″E
- Country: Iran
- Province: West Azerbaijan
- County: Mahabad
- District: Khalifan

Population (2016)
  - Total: 749
- Time zone: UTC+3:30 (IRST)

Khalifan (Persian: خليفان) (Note: Also romanized as Khalīfān) is a city in, and the capital of, Khalifan District in Mahabad County, West Azerbaijan province, Iran.

== Demographics ==
=== Population ===
At the time of the 2006 National Census, Khalifan's population was 425 in 77 households, when it was a village in Kani Bazar Rural District. The following census in 2011 counted 962 people in 128 households, by which time the village had been converted to a city. The 2016 census measured the population of the city as 749 people in 119 households, the vast majority of whom were Kurds.
