= Quzluy-e Sofla, Mahabad =

Village in West Azerbaijan province, Iran

Quzluy-e Sofla Persian: قوزلوي سفلي
- Village
- Location within Iran
- Coordinates: 36°29′19″N 45°41′41″E
- Country: Iran
- Province: West Azerbaijan
- County: Mahabad
- District: Khalifan
- Rural District: Kani Bazar

Population (2016)
  - Total: 292
- Time zone: UTC+3:30 (IRST)

Quzluy-e Sofla (Persian: قوزلوي سفلي) (Note: Also romanized as Qūzlūy-e Soflá; also known as Qowzlū-ye Pā’īn and Qowzlū-ye Soflá) is a village in Kani Bazar Rural District of Khalifan District in Mahabad County, West Azerbaijan province, Iran.

== Demographics ==
=== Population ===
At the time of the 2006 National Census, the village's population was 346 in 49 households. The following census in 2011 counted 301 people in 63 households. The 2016 census measured the population of the village as 292 people in 79 households.
