= Siah Kol =

Siah Kol سياه كل
- Village
- Location within Iran
- Coordinates: 34°05′14″N 47°02′23″E
- Country: Iran
- Province: Kermanshah
- County: Kermanshah
- Bakhsh: Firuzabad
- Rural District: Sar Firuzabad

Population (2006)
  - Total: 204
- Time zone: UTC+3:30 (IRST)
  - Summer (DST): UTC+4:30 (IRDT)

Siah Kol (Persian: سياه كل, also Romanized as Sīāh Kol; also known as Sīāh Gol) is a village in Sar Firuzabad Rural District, Firuzabad District, Kermanshah County, Kermanshah Province, Iran. At the 2006 census, its population was 204, in 44 families.
