= Siah Gol, Kermanshah =

Siah Gol سياه گل
- Village
- Location within Iran
- Coordinates: 34°11′49″N 45°52′18″E
- Country: Iran
- Province: Kermanshah
- County: Gilan-e Gharb
- Bakhsh: Central
- Rural District: Howmeh

Population (2006)
  - Total: 197
- Time zone: UTC+3:30 (IRST)
  - Summer (DST): UTC+4:30 (IRDT)

Siah Gol (Persian: سياه گل, also Romanized as Sīāh Gol, Sīyāh Gol, and Sīāhgel) is a village in Howmeh Rural District, in the Central District of Gilan-e Gharb County, Kermanshah Province, Iran. At the 2006 census, its population was 197, in 36 families.
