= Qozlu, Lachin =

Gozlu
- Azerbaijani: Qozlu
- Location within Azerbaijan Location within East Zangezur Economic Region
- Coordinates: 39°45′00″N 46°30′49″E
- Country: Azerbaijan
- District: Lachin
- Time zone: UTC+4 (AZT)
  - Summer (DST): UTC+5 (AZT)

Qozlu (also, Gozlu) is a village in the Lachin District of Azerbaijan.
