= Quzluy-e Sofla, Shahin Dezh =

Quzluy-e Sofla قوزلوي سفلي
- Village
- Location within Iran
- Coordinates: 36°48′37″N 46°42′53″E
- Country: Iran
- Province: West Azerbaijan
- County: Shahin Dezh
- Bakhsh: Keshavarz
- Rural District: Chaharduli

Population (2006)
  - Total: 171
- Time zone: UTC+3:30 (IRST)
  - Summer (DST): UTC+4:30 (IRDT)

Quzluy-e Sofla (Persian: قوزلوي سفلي, also Romanized as Qūzlūy-e Soflá; also known as Qowzlū-ye Pā‘īn and Qozlū-ye Soflá) is a village in Chaharduli Rural District, Keshavarz District, Shahin Dezh County, West Azerbaijan Province, Iran. At the 2006 census, its population was 171, in 31 families.
