= Siah Gel, Eyvan =

Siah Gel سياه گل
- Village
- Location within Iran
- Coordinates: 33°54′11″N 46°05′32″E
- Country: Iran
- Province: Ilam
- County: Eyvan
- Bakhsh: Zarneh
- Rural District: Kalan

Population (2006)
  - Total: 39
- Time zone: UTC+3:30 (IRST)
  - Summer (DST): UTC+4:30 (IRDT)

Siah Gel (Persian: سياه گل, also Romanized as Sīāh Gel) is a village in Kalan Rural District, Zarneh District, Eyvan County, Ilam Province, Iran. At the 2006 census, its population was 39, in 8 families. The village is populated by Kurds.
