= Siah Gel, Lorestan =

Siah Gel سياه گل
- Village
- Location within Iran
- Coordinates: 33°35′31″N 48°36′59″E
- Country: Iran
- Province: Lorestan
- County: Khorramabad
- Bakhsh: Bayravand
- Rural District: Beyranvand-e Jonubi

Population (2006)
  - Total: 33
- Time zone: UTC+3:30 (IRST)
  - Summer (DST): UTC+4:30 (IRDT)

Siah Gel (Persian: سياه گل, also Romanized as Sīāh Gel) is a village in Beyranvand-e Jonubi Rural District, Bayravand District, Khorramabad County, Lorestan Province, Iran. At the 2006 census, its population was 33, in 9 families.
