= Siah Gel-e Shah Abbas =

Siah Gel-e Shah Abbas سياهگل شاه عباس
- Village
- Location within Iran
- Coordinates: 33°35′07″N 48°36′06″E
- Country: Iran
- Province: Lorestan
- County: Khorramabad
- Bakhsh: Bayravand
- Rural District: Beyranvand-e Jonubi

Population (2006)
  - Total: 54
- Time zone: UTC+3:30 (IRST)
  - Summer (DST): UTC+4:30 (IRDT)

Siah Gel-e Shah Abbas (Persian: سياهگل شاه عباس, also Romanized as Sīāh Gel-e Shāh ‘Abbās; also known as Sīāh Gel) is a village in Beyranvand-e Jonubi Rural District, Bayravand District, Khorramabad County, Lorestan Province, Iran. At the 2006 census, its population was 54, in 15 families.
