= Quzluy-e Olya, Shahin Dezh =

Quzluy-e Olya قوزلوي عليا
- Village
- Location within Iran
- Coordinates: 36°48′59″N 46°44′20″E
- Country: Iran
- Province: West Azerbaijan
- County: Shahin Dezh
- Bakhsh: Keshavarz
- Rural District: Chaharduli

Population (2006)
  - Total: 236
- Time zone: UTC+3:30 (IRST)
  - Summer (DST): UTC+4:30 (IRDT)

Quzluy-e Olya (Persian: قوزلوي عليا, also Romanized as Qūzlūy-e ‘Olyā; also known as Qowzlū-ye Bālā and Qozlū-ye ‘Olyā) is a village in Chaharduli Rural District, Keshavarz District, Shahin Dezh County, West Azerbaijan Province, Iran. At the 2006 census, its population was 236, in 42 families.
