= Siah Gel, Abdanan =

Siah Gel سياه گل
- Village
- Location within Iran
- Coordinates: 32°42′48″N 47°49′16″E
- Country: Iran
- Province: Ilam
- County: Abdanan
- Bakhsh: Kalat
- Rural District: Abanar

Population (2006)
  - Total: 322
- Time zone: UTC+3:30 (IRST)
  - Summer (DST): UTC+4:30 (IRDT)

Siah Gel (Persian: سياه گل, also Romanized as Sīāh Gel, Seyāh Gol, Sīāh Gol, and Sīyāh Gol) is a village in the Abanar Rural District, Kalat District, Abdanan County, Ilam Province, Iran. At the 2006 census, its population was 322, in 59 families. The village is populated by Lurs.
