= Kani Rash, Kermanshah =

Kani Rash كاني رش
- Village
- Location within Iran
- Coordinates: 34°47′41″N 45°58′08″E
- Country: Iran
- Province: Kermanshah
- County: Salas-e Babajani
- Bakhsh: Central
- Rural District: Khaneh Shur

Population (2006)
  - Total: 276
- Time zone: UTC+3:30 (IRST)
  - Summer (DST): UTC+4:30 (IRDT)

Kani Rash (Persian: كاني رش, also Romanized as Kānī Rash and Kānī Resh) is a village in Khaneh Shur Rural District, in the Central District of Salas-e Babajani County, Kermanshah Province, Iran. At the 2006 census, its population was 276, in 60 families.
