= Quzluy-e Khaniyeh =

Quzluy-e Khaniyeh قوزلوي خانيه
- Village
- Location within Iran
- Coordinates: 38°47′42″N 44°57′06″E
- Country: Iran
- Province: West Azerbaijan
- County: Chaypareh
- Bakhsh: Central
- Rural District: Churs

Population (2006)
  - Total: 28
- Time zone: UTC+3:30 (IRST)
  - Summer (DST): UTC+4:30 (IRDT)

Quzluy-e Khaniyeh (Persian: قوزلوي خانيه, also Romanized as Qūzlūy-e Khānīyeh; also known as Qūzlū-ye Khāneqāh and Qūzlū-ye Khānīyeh) is a village in Churs Rural District, in the Central District of Chaypareh County, West Azerbaijan Province, Iran. At the 2006 census, its population was 28, in 8 families.
