= Quzlu, Germi =

Village in Ardabil province, Iran

Quzlu Persian: قوزلو
- Village
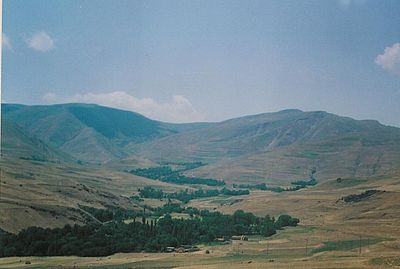
- Quzlu village

- Location within Iran
- Coordinates: 39°00′08″N 48°08′40″E
- Country: Iran
- Province: Ardabil
- County: Germi
- District: Central
- Rural District: Ani

Population (2016)
  - Total: 120
- Time zone: UTC+3:30 (IRST)

Quzlu (Persian: قوزلو) (Note: Also romanized as Qūzlū; also known as Tūzlū) is a village in Ani Rural District of the Central District in Germi County, (Note: Formerly Moghan County) Ardabil province, Iran. Quzlu lies on the Mughan plain; the people are Shia Muslim and speak in Azerbaijani language.

== Etymology ==
The name Quzlu (Oghuzlu/Ghozlu/Qozlu) originates with the Oghuz Turks. An alternative theory about the etymology of this name is that, because the place has many walnut trees and walnut in the Azeri and Persian languages is qoz or joz, the name means "the place with many walnut trees."

== Demographics ==
=== Population ===
Qozlu in 1987, 1992, and 1997 had 403, 375, and 295 inhabitants, respectively. At the time of the 2006 National Census, the village's population was 222 in 47 households. The following census in 2011 counted 163 people in 41 households. The 2016 census measured the population of the village as 120 people in 39 households.

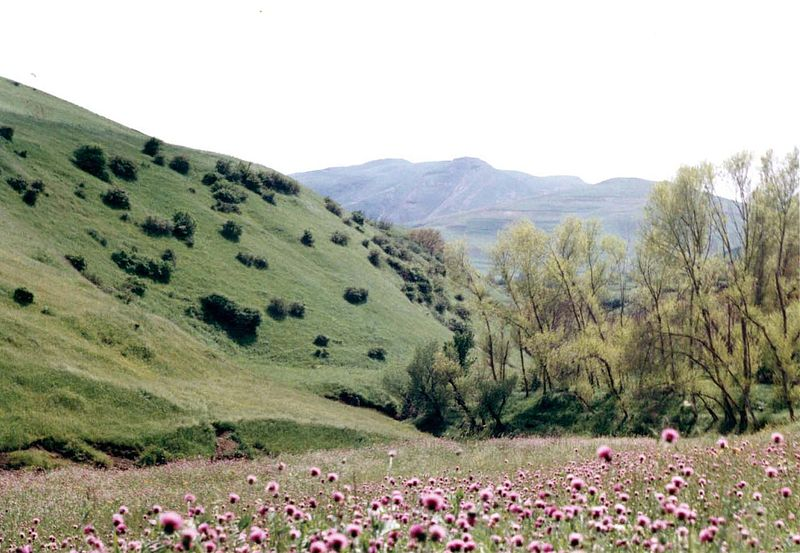
