= Quzluy-e Afshar =

Village in West Azerbaijan province, Iran

Quzluy-e Afshar Persian: قوزلوي افشار
- Village
- Location within Iran
- Coordinates: 36°30′34″N 46°38′08″E
- Country: Iran
- Province: West Azerbaijan
- County: Shahin Dezh
- District: Central
- Rural District: Safa Khaneh

Population (2016)
  - Total: 1,411
- Time zone: UTC+3:30 (IRST)

Quzluy-e Afshar (Persian: قوزلوي افشار) (Note: Also romanized as Qūzlūy-e Afshār; also known as Qowzlū-ye Afshār, Qozlū-Ye-Afshār, and Qūzlū-ye Afshār) is a village in Safa Khaneh Rural District of the Central District in Shahin Dezh County, West Azerbaijan province, Iran.

== Demographics ==
=== Population ===
At the time of the 2006 National Census, the village's population was 1,757 in 336 households. The following census in 2011 counted 1,731 people in 367 households. The 2016 census measured the population of the village as 1,411 people in 432 households. It was the most populous village in its rural district.
