= Kani Bazar Rural District =

Rural district in West Azerbaijan province, Iran

Kani Bazar Rural District Persian: دهستان كاني بازار
- Rural District
- Location within Iran
- Coordinates: 36°27′N 45°44′E
- Country: Iran
- Province: West Azerbaijan
- County: Mahabad
- District: Khalifan
- Established: 1987
- Capital: Kitekeh

Population (2016)
  - Total: 7,801
- Time zone: UTC+3:30 (IRST)

Kani Bazar Rural District (Persian: دهستان كاني بازار) is in Khalifan District of Mahabad County, West Azerbaijan province, Iran. Its capital is the village of Kitekeh.

== Demographics ==
=== Population ===
At the time of the 2006 National Census, the rural district's population was 10,199 in 1,555 households. There were 8,910 inhabitants in 1,572 households at the following census of 2011. The 2016 census measured the population of the rural district as 7,801 in 2,224 households. The most populous of its 45 villages was Kani Sib, with 380 people.

=== Other villages in the rural district ===
- Kani Rash
- Kavelan-e Sofla
- Kuran
- Mazhgeh
- Qalui Zendan
- Quzluy-e Olya
- Quzluy-e Sofla
- Savinas
- Uzuntash
