= Mangur-e Sharqi Rural District =

Rural district in West Azerbaijan province, Iran

Mangur-e Sharqi Rural District Persian: دهستان منگور شرقی
- Rural District
- Location within Iran
- Coordinates: 36°34′N 45°37′E
- Country: Iran
- Province: West Azerbaijan
- County: Mahabad
- District: Khalifan
- Established: 1987
- Capital: Abdollah Kordeh

Population (2016)
  - Total: 6,230
- Time zone: UTC+3:30 (IRST)

Mangur-e Sharqi Rural District (Persian: دهستان منگور شرقی) is in Khalifan District of Mahabad County, West Azerbaijan province, Iran. Its capital is the village of Abdollah Kordeh. The previous capital of the rural district was the village of Hamzehabad.

== Demographics ==
=== Population ===
At the time of the 2006 National Census, the rural district's population was 7,545 in 1,186 households. The following census in 2011 counted 6,900 inhabitants in 1,403 households. The 2016 census measured the population of the rural district as 6,230 in 1,324 households. The most populous of its 79 villages was Hamzehabad, with 469 people.

=== Other villages in the rural district ===
- Amid
- Beytas
- Gagosh-e Sofla
- Jandaran
- Maraneh
- Miriseh
- Salm
- Sartan
