= Khalifan District =

District in West Azerbaijan province, Iran

Khalifan District Persian: بخش خلیفان
- District
- Location within Iran
- Coordinates: 36°30′N 45°40′E
- Country: Iran
- Province: West Azerbaijan
- County: Mahabad
- Established: 1989
- Capital: Khalifan

Population (2016)
  - Total: 14,780
- Time zone: UTC+3:30 (IRST)

Khalifan District (Persian: بخش خلیفان) is in Mahabad County, West Azerbaijan province, Iran. Its capital is the city of Khalifan.

== History ==
The village of Khalifan was converted to a city in 2010.

== Demographics ==
=== Population ===
At the time of the 2006 census, the district's population was 17,744 in 2,741 households. The following census in 2011 counted 16,772 people in 3,103 households. The 2016 census measured the population of the district as 14,780 inhabitants in 3,667 households.

=== Administrative divisions ===
Khalifan District Population
Administrative Divisions	2006	2011	2016
Kani Bazar RD	10,199	8,910	7,801
Mangur-e Sharqi RD	7,545	6,900	6,230
Khalifan (city)		962	749
Total	17,744	16,772	14,780
RD = Rural District
