= Mahabad County =

County in West Azerbaijan province, Iran

Mahabad County Persian: شهرستان مهاباد
- County
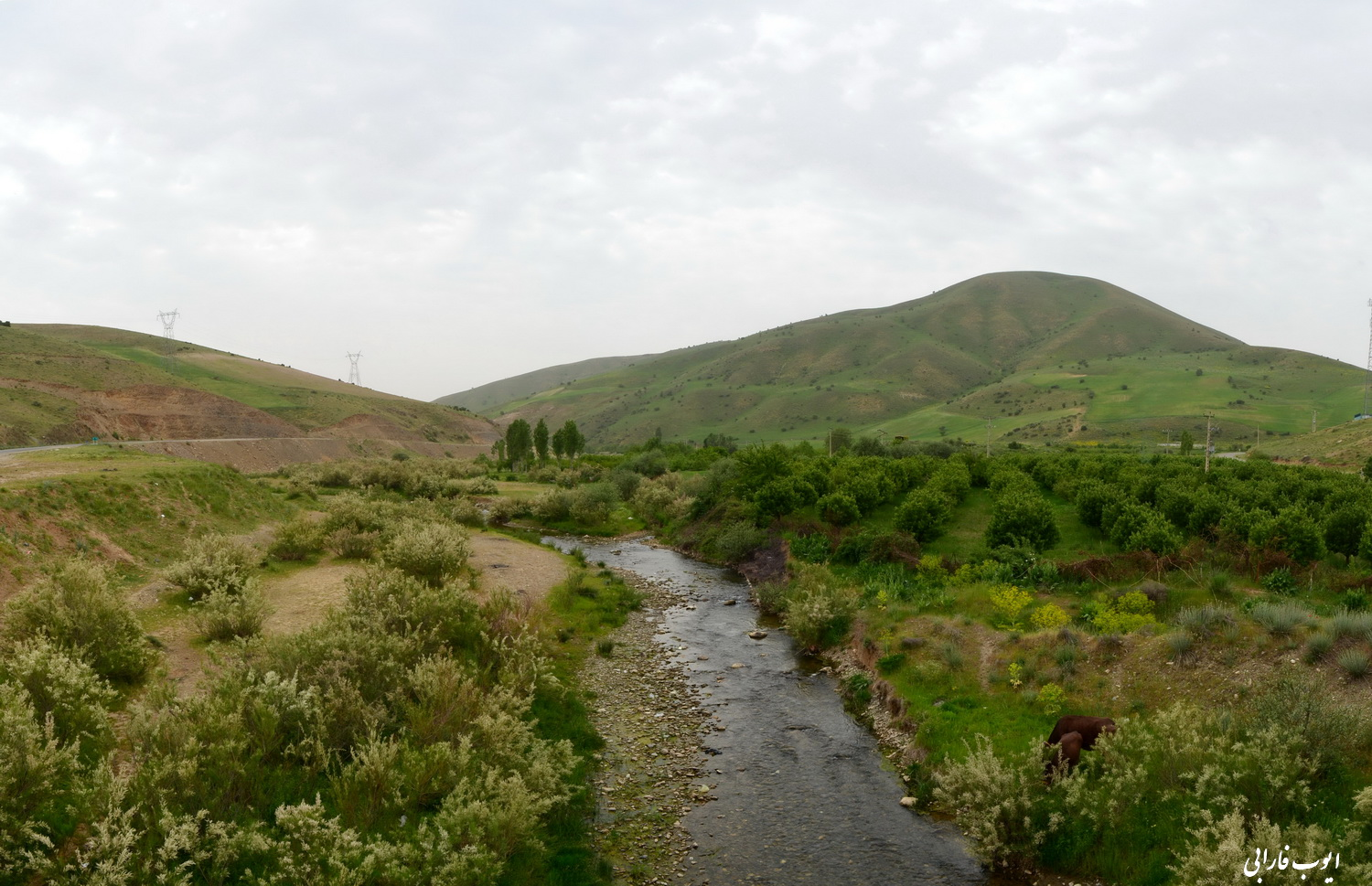
- Mahabad–Sardasht Road
- Nickname: سابلاغ
- Location of Mahabad County in West Azerbaijan province (bottom center, green)

- Location of West Azerbaijan province in Iran
- Coordinates: 36°39′N 45°42′E
- Country: Iran
- Province: West Azerbaijan
- Capital: Mahabad
- Districts: Central, Khalifan

Area
  - Total: 2,591 km^{2} (1,000 sq mi)

Population (2016)
  - Total: 236,849
  - Density: 91.41/km^{2} (236.8/sq mi)
- Time zone: UTC+3:30 (IRST)

Mahabad County (Persian: شهرستان مهاباد) is in West Azerbaijan province, Iran. Its capital is the city of Mahabad.

== History ==
The village of Khalifan was converted to a city in 2010.

== Demographics ==
=== Population ===
At the time of the 2006 census, the county's population was 197,441 in 42,493 households. The following census in 2011 counted 215,529 people in 53,563 households. The 2016 census measured the population of the county as 236,849 in 65,562 households.

=== Administrative divisions ===
Mahabad County's population history and administrative structure over three consecutive censuses are shown in the following table.

Mahabad County Population
Administrative Divisions	2006	2011	2016
Central District	179,697	198,757	222,069
Akhtachi-ye Gharbi RD	7,899	7,455	7,412
Mokriyan-e Gharbi RD	25,643	28,877	30,719
Mokriyan-e Sharqi RD	12,831	15,157	15,545
Mahabad (city)	133,324	147,268	168,393
Khalifan District	17,744	16,772	14,780
Kani Bazar RD	10,199	8,910	7,801
Mangur-e Sharqi RD	7,545	6,900	6,230
Khalifan (city)		962	749
Total	197,441	215,529	236,849
RD = Rural District

== Geography ==
The climate is mountainous with cold winters and temperate summers. The Mahabad River flows through the capital.

== See also ==
Media related to Mahabad County at Wikimedia Commons
