= Donbaki =

Donbaki دنبکی
- Village
- Location within Iran
- Coordinates: 38°52′10″N 44°35′39″E
- Country: Iran
- Province: West Azerbaijan
- County: Khoy
- Bakhsh: Safayyeh
- Rural District: Sokmanabad

Population (2006)
  - Total: 175
- Time zone: UTC+3:30 (IRST)
  - Summer (DST): UTC+4:30 (IRDT)

Donbaki (Persian: دنبکی, also Romanized as Donbakī) is a village in Sokmanabad Rural District, Safayyeh District, Khoy County, West Azerbaijan Province, Iran. At the 2006 census, its population was 175, in 34 families.
