= Molla Esmail =

Molla Esmail ملااسماعيل
- Village
- Location within Iran
- Coordinates: 38°53′30″N 44°42′14″E
- Country: Iran
- Province: West Azerbaijan
- County: Khoy
- Bakhsh: Safayyeh
- Rural District: Sokmanabad

Population (2006)
  - Total: 125
- Time zone: UTC+3:30 (IRST)
  - Summer (DST): UTC+4:30 (IRDT)

Molla Esmail (Persian: ملااسماعيل, also Romanized as Mollā Esmā‘īl) is a village in Sokmanabad Rural District, Safayyeh District, Khoy County, West Azerbaijan Province, Iran. At the 2006 census, its population was 125, in 15 families.
