= Ariglu =

Ariglu اريگلو
- Village
- Location within Iran
- Coordinates: 38°55′05″N 44°38′41″E
- Country: Iran
- Province: West Azerbaijan
- County: Khoy
- Bakhsh: Safayyeh
- Rural District: Sokmanabad

Population (2006)
  - Total: 134
- Time zone: UTC+3:30 (IRST)
  - Summer (DST): UTC+4:30 (IRDT)

Ariglu (Persian: اريگلو, also Romanized as Arīglū; also known as Arīklū) is a village in Sokmanabad Rural District, Safayyeh District, Khoy County, West Azerbaijan Province, Iran. At the 2006 census, its population was 134, in 29 families.
