= Agh Bash =

Agh Bash اغ باش
- Village
- Location within Iran
- Coordinates: 38°50′02″N 44°37′44″E
- Country: Iran
- Province: West Azerbaijan
- County: Khoy
- Bakhsh: Safayyeh
- Rural District: Sokmanabad

Population (2006)
  - Total: 413
- Time zone: UTC+3:30 (IRST)
  - Summer (DST): UTC+4:30 (IRDT)

Agh Bash (Persian: اغ باش, also Romanized as Āgh Bāsh and Āghbāsh) is a village in Sokmanabad Rural District, Safayyeh District, Khoy County, West Azerbaijan Province, Iran. At the 2006 census, its population was 413, in 61 families.
