= Ali Sheykh =

Ali Sheykh علي شيخ
- Village
- Location within Iran
- Coordinates: 38°49′25″N 44°34′46″E
- Country: Iran
- Province: West Azerbaijan
- County: Khoy
- Bakhsh: Safayyeh
- Rural District: Sokmanabad

Population (2006)
  - Total: 210
- Time zone: UTC+3:30 (IRST)
  - Summer (DST): UTC+4:30 (IRDT)

Ali Sheykh (Persian: علي شيخ, also Romanized as Alī Sheykh and ‘Alī Sheykh) is a village in Sokmanabad Rural District, Safayyeh District, Khoy County, West Azerbaijan Province, Iran. At the 2006 census, its population was 210, in 49 families. Ali Sheykh village is located 48 km northwest of Khoy city in Safayyeh section (Sakmanabad), In recent writings, the distance from Khoy to Ali Sheykh is 45 km, and this is the reason for increasing the size of Khoy city, especially in the west direction and changing the origin of the measurement. The area of the village is 5,000 square meters, the area of irrigated lands is 150 hectares and the area of rainfed lands is 44 hectares. The area of pastures reaches 2,100 hectares. Ali Sheykh Military School (Martyr Bahman Shirsavar) had 40 to 50 students in the first years of its establishment. Currently, more than 60 families live in this village.
