= Galleh Peran =

Galleh Peran گله پران
- Village
- Location within Iran
- Coordinates: 38°48′23″N 44°29′48″E
- Country: Iran
- Province: West Azerbaijan
- County: Khoy
- Bakhsh: Safayyeh
- Rural District: Sokmanabad

Population (2006)
  - Total: 177
- Time zone: UTC+3:30 (IRST)
  - Summer (DST): UTC+4:30 (IRDT)

Galleh Peran (Persian: گله پران, also Romanized as Galleh Perān; also known as Golpīrān and Gūlah Pīrān) is a village in Sokmanabad Rural District, Safayyeh District, Khoy County, West Azerbaijan Province, Iran. At the 2006 census, its population was 177, in 31 families.
