= Kalus =

Kalus كلوس
- Village
- Location within Iran
- Coordinates: 38°52′54″N 44°42′57″E
- Country: Iran
- Province: West Azerbaijan
- County: Khoy
- Bakhsh: Safayyeh
- Rural District: Sokmanabad

Population (2006)
  - Total: 106
- Time zone: UTC+3:30 (IRST)
  - Summer (DST): UTC+4:30 (IRDT)

Kalus (Persian: كلوس, also Romanized as Kalūs; also known as Kūlūs) is a village in Sokmanabad Rural District, Safayyeh District, Khoy County, West Azerbaijan Province, Iran. At the 2006 census, its population was 106, in 19 families.
