= Qaranjeh =

Qaranjeh قارنجه
- Village
- Location within Iran
- Coordinates: 38°51′20″N 44°31′43″E
- Country: Iran
- Province: West Azerbaijan
- County: Khoy
- Bakhsh: Safayyeh
- Rural District: Sokmanabad

Population (2006)
  - Total: 167
- Time zone: UTC+3:30 (IRST)
  - Summer (DST): UTC+4:30 (IRDT)

Qaranjeh (Persian: قارنجه, also Romanized as Qāranjeh; also known as Qārīnjān) is a village in Sokmanabad Rural District, Safayyeh District, Khoy County, West Azerbaijan Province, Iran. At the 2006 census, its population was 167, in 34 families.
