= Qezel Aghol =

Qezel Aghol قزل اغل
- Village
- Location within Iran
- Coordinates: 38°41′59″N 44°29′29″E
- Country: Iran
- Province: West Azerbaijan
- County: Khoy
- Bakhsh: Safayyeh
- Rural District: Aland

Population (2006)
  - Total: 229
- Time zone: UTC+3:30 (IRST)
  - Summer (DST): UTC+4:30 (IRDT)

Qezel Aghol (Persian: قزل اغل, also Romanized as Qezel Āghol) is a village in Aland Rural District, Safayyeh District, Khoy County, West Azerbaijan Province, Iran. At the 2006 census, its population was 229, in 36 families.
