= Mohammad Sheli =

Mohammad Sheli محمدشلي
- Village
- Location within Iran
- Coordinates: 38°53′01″N 44°29′00″E
- Country: Iran
- Province: West Azerbaijan
- County: Khoy
- Bakhsh: Safayyeh
- Rural District: Sokmanabad

Population (2006)
  - Total: 31
- Time zone: UTC+3:30 (IRST)
  - Summer (DST): UTC+4:30 (IRDT)

Mohammad Sheli (Persian: محمدشلي, also Romanized as Moḩammad Shelī) is a village in Sokmanabad Rural District, Safayyeh District, Khoy County, West Azerbaijan Province, Iran. At the 2006 census, its population was 31, in 9 families.
