= Qiz =

A QIZ is a Qualifying Industrial Zone in Egypt or Jordan.

Qiz may refer to:

- Qiz-e Bala
- Qiz-e Pain
- Qiz Ulan
- Qiz Qaleh
- Qiz Qalehsi
- Qiz Qapan
