= Qurqan, Iran =

Qurqan قورقان
- Village
- Location within Iran
- Coordinates: 38°53′46″N 44°37′16″E
- Country: Iran
- Province: West Azerbaijan
- County: Khoy
- Bakhsh: Safayyeh
- Rural District: Sokmanabad

Population (2006)
  - Total: 63
- Time zone: UTC+3:30 (IRST)
  - Summer (DST): UTC+4:30 (IRDT)

Qurqan (Persian: قورقان, also Romanized as Qūrqān; also known as Qorqān) is a village in Sokmanabad Rural District, Safayyeh District, Khoy County, West Azerbaijan Province, Iran. At the 2006 census, its population was 63, in 15 families.
