= Jang-e Sar =

Jang-e Sar (Persian: جنگ سر) may refer to:

- Jang-e Sar, Khoy
- Jang-e Sar, Salmas
