= Qezel Dash-e Sofla =

Qezel Dash-e Sofla قزلداش سفلي
- Village
- Location within Iran
- Coordinates: 38°53′14″N 44°33′21″E
- Country: Iran
- Province: West Azerbaijan
- County: Khoy
- Bakhsh: Safayyeh
- Rural District: Sokmanabad

Population (2006)
  - Total: 76
- Time zone: UTC+3:30 (IRST)
  - Summer (DST): UTC+4:30 (IRDT)

Qezel Dash-e Sofla (Persian: قزلداش سفلي, also Romanized as Qezel Dāsh-e Soflá; also known as Qezeldāsh-e Pā'īn) is a village in Sokmanabad Rural District, Safayyeh District, Khoy County, West Azerbaijan Province, Iran. At the 2006 census, its population was 76, in 12 families.
