= Qiz Ulan =

Qiz Ulan قيزاولن
- Village
- Location within Iran
- Coordinates: 38°52′36″N 44°39′20″E
- Country: Iran
- Province: West Azerbaijan
- County: Khoy
- Bakhsh: Safayyeh
- Rural District: Sokmanabad

Population (2006)
  - Total: 226
- Time zone: UTC+3:30 (IRST)
  - Summer (DST): UTC+4:30 (IRDT)

Qiz Ulan (Persian: قيزاولن, also Romanized as Qīz Ūlan) is a village in Sokmanabad Rural District, Safayyeh District, Khoy County, West Azerbaijan Province, Iran. At the 2006 census, its population was 226, in 41 families.
