= Qeris =

Village in West Azerbaijan province, Iran

Qeris Persian: قريس
- Village
- Location within Iran
- Coordinates: 38°39′25″N 44°39′27″E
- Country: Iran
- Province: West Azerbaijan
- County: Khoy
- District: Safayyeh
- Rural District: Sokmanabad

Population (2016)
  - Total: 605
- Time zone: UTC+3:30 (IRST)

Qeris (Persian: قريس) (Note: Also romanized as Qerīs; in Armenian: Ղրիս) is a village in Sokmanabad Rural District of Safayyeh District in Khoy County, West Azerbaijan province, Iran.

== Demographics ==
=== Population ===
At the time of the 2006 National Census, the village's population was 625 in 118 households. The following census in 2011 counted 599 people in 145 households. The 2016 census measured the population of the village as 605 people in 182 households.
