= Qarah Qush-e Olya =

Qarah Qush-e Olya قره قوش عليا
- Village
- Location within Iran
- Coordinates: 38°46′30″N 44°33′19″E
- Country: Iran
- Province: West Azerbaijan
- County: Khoy
- Bakhsh: Safayyeh
- Rural District: Sokmanabad

Population (2006)
  - Total: 139
- Time zone: UTC+3:30 (IRST)
  - Summer (DST): UTC+4:30 (IRDT)

Qarah Qush-e Olya (Persian: قره قوش عليا, also Romanized as Qarah Qūsh-e ‘Olyā and Qareh Qūsh-e ‘Olyā; also known as Qara Kush Yukāri, Qareh Qūsh, Qarehqūsh Bālā, and Qareh Qūsh-e Bālā) is a village in Sokmanabad Rural District, Safayyeh District, Khoy County, West Azerbaijan Province, Iran. At the 2006 census, its population was 139, in 29 families.
