= Qarah Qush-e Sofla =

Qarah Qush-e Sofla قره قوش سفلي
- Village
- Location within Iran
- Coordinates: 38°47′40″N 44°33′57″E
- Country: Iran
- Province: West Azerbaijan
- County: Khoy
- Bakhsh: Safayyeh
- Rural District: Sokmanabad

Population (2006)
  - Total: 102
- Time zone: UTC+3:30 (IRST)
  - Summer (DST): UTC+4:30 (IRDT)

Qarah Qush-e Sofla (Persian: قره قوش سفلي, also Romanized as Qarah Qūsh-e Soflá and Qareh Qūsh-e Soflá; also known as Qara Kush Ashāghi, Qareh Qūsh-e Pā”īn, and Qarehqūsh Pā”īn) is a village in Sokmanabad Rural District, Safayyeh District, Khoy County, West Azerbaijan Province, Iran. At the 2006 census, its population was 102, in 28 families.
