= Dibak, Khoy =

Dibak ديبك
- Village
- Location within Iran
- Coordinates: 38°45′39″N 44°30′31″E
- Country: Iran
- Province: West Azerbaijan
- County: Khoy
- Bakhsh: Safayyeh
- Rural District: Sokmanabad

Population (2006)
  - Total: 124
- Time zone: UTC+3:30 (IRST)
  - Summer (DST): UTC+4:30 (IRDT)

Dibak (Persian: ديبك, also Romanized as Dībak) is a village in Sokmanabad Rural District, Safayyeh District, Khoy County, West Azerbaijan Province, Iran. At the 2006 census, its population was 124, in 24 families.
