= Bardarash, Iran =

Bardarash (Persian: بردرش), also rendered as Badarash, in Iran may refer to:

- Bardarash, Kurdistan
- Bardarash-e Olya, West Azerbaijan Province
- Bardarash-e Sofla, West Azerbaijan Province
