= Jang-e Sar, Khoy =

Jang-e Sar جنگسر
- Village
- Location within Iran
- Coordinates: 38°44′25″N 44°27′21″E
- Country: Iran
- Province: West Azerbaijan
- County: Khoy
- Bakhsh: Safayyeh
- Rural District: Aland

Population (2006)
  - Total: 230
- Time zone: UTC+3:30 (IRST)
  - Summer (DST): UTC+4:30 (IRDT)

Jang-e Sar (Persian: جنگسر; also known as Jangehsar and Jangeh Sar) is a village in Aland Rural District, Safayyeh District, Khoy County, West Azerbaijan Province, Iran. At the 2006 census, its population was 230, in 41 families.
