= Karkush =

Village in West Azerbaijan province, Iran

Karkush Persian: كركوش
- Village
- Location within Iran
- Coordinates: 38°43′34″N 44°17′12″E
- Country: Iran
- Province: West Azerbaijan
- County: Khoy
- District: Safayyeh
- Rural District: Aland

Population (2016)
  - Total: 426
- Time zone: UTC+3:30 (IRST)

Karkush (Persian: كركوش) (Note: Also romanized as Karkūsh; also known as Garkosh and Kar Kosh) is a village in, Aland Rural District of Safayyeh District in Khoy County, West Azerbaijan province, Iran.

== Demographics ==
=== Population ===
At the time of the 2006 National Census, the village's population was 594 in 113 households. The following census in 2011 counted 843 people in 195 households. The 2016 census measured the population of the village as 426 people in 102 households.
