= Aq Bolagh-e Sofla =

Village in West Azerbaijan province, Iran

Aq Bolagh-e Sofla Persian: اق بلاغ سفلي
- Village
- Location within Iran
- Coordinates: 38°53′13″N 44°31′28″E
- Country: Iran
- Province: West Azerbaijan
- County: Khoy
- District: Safayyeh
- Rural District: Sokmanabad

Population (2016)
  - Total: 726
- Time zone: UTC+3:30 (IRST)

Aq Bolagh-e Sofla (Persian: اق بلاغ سفلي) (Note: Also romanized as Āq Bolāgh-e Soflá; also known as Āgh Bolāgh-e Soflá (اغبلاغ سفلي) and Āghbolāgh-e Pā'īn) is a village in Sokmanabad Rural District of Safayyeh District in Khoy County, West Azerbaijan province, Iran.

== Demographics ==
=== Population ===
At the time of the 2006 National Census, the village's population was 679 in 109 households. The following census in 2011 counted 699 people in 143 households. The 2016 census measured the population of the village as 726 people in 172 households.
