= Mostafaabad, West Azerbaijan =

Mostafaabad مصطفي اباد
- Village
- Location within Iran
- Coordinates: 38°42′06″N 44°28′37″E
- Country: Iran
- Province: West Azerbaijan
- County: Khoy
- Bakhsh: Safayyeh
- Rural District: Aland

Population (2006)
  - Total: 93
- Time zone: UTC+3:30 (IRST)
  - Summer (DST): UTC+4:30 (IRDT)

Mostafaabad (Persian: مصطفي اباد, also Romanized as Moşţafáābād) is a village in Aland Rural District, Safayyeh District, Khoy County, West Azerbaijan Province, Iran. At the 2006 census, its population was 93, in 21 families.
