= Mostafaabad =

Mostafaabad (Persian: مصطفي اباد) may refer to:

- Mostafaabad, Kuhrang, Chaharmahal and Bakhtiari Province
- Mostafaabad, Shahrekord, Chaharmahal and Bakhtiari Province
- Mostafaabad, West Azerbaijan
