= Chakmeh Zar =

Village in West Azerbaijan province, Iran

Chakmeh Zar Persian: چكمه زر
- Village
- Location within Iran
- Coordinates: 38°40′08″N 44°21′51″E
- Country: Iran
- Province: West Azerbaijan
- County: Khoy
- District: Safayyeh
- Rural District: Aland

Population (2016)
  - Total: 499
- Time zone: UTC+3:30 (IRST)

Chakmeh Zar (Persian: چكمه زر) is a village in, Aland Rural District of Safayyeh District in Khoy County, West Azerbaijan province, Iran.

== Demographics ==
=== Population ===
At the time of the 2006 National Census, the village's population was 490 in 85 households. The following census in 2011 counted 615 people in 132 households. The 2016 census measured the population of the village as 499 people in 120 households.
