= Sonnat-e Olya =

Sonnat-e Olya سنت عليا
- Village
- Location within Iran
- Coordinates: 38°51′49″N 44°41′47″E
- Country: Iran
- Province: West Azerbaijan
- County: Khoy
- Bakhsh: Safayyeh
- Rural District: Sokmanabad

Population (2006)
  - Total: 50
- Time zone: UTC+3:30 (IRST)
  - Summer (DST): UTC+4:30 (IRDT)

Sonnat-e Olya (Persian: سنت عليا, also Romanized as Sonnat-e ‘Olyā; also known as Sonnat, and Sonnat-e Bālā) is a village in Sokmanabad Rural District, Safayyeh District, Khoy County, West Azerbaijan Province, Iran. At the 2006 census, its population was 50, in 6 families.
