= Sonnat =

Sonnat (Persian: سنت) may refer to:

- Sonnat-e Olya
- Sonnat-e Sofla
