= Dibak =

Dibak (Persian: ديبك) may refer to:

- Dibak, Khoy
- Dibak, Maku
