= Yar Paqlu =

Village in West Azerbaijan province, Iran

Yar Paqlu Persian: يارپاقلو
- Village
- Location within Iran
- Coordinates: 38°42′10″N 44°24′51″E
- Country: Iran
- Province: West Azerbaijan
- County: Khoy
- District: Safayyeh
- Rural District: Aland

Population (2016)
  - Total: 499
- Time zone: UTC+3:30 (IRST)

Yar Paqlu (Persian: يارپاقلو) (Note: Also romanized as Yār Pāqlū; also known as Yeprāqlū) is a village in, Aland Rural District of Safayyeh District in Khoy County, West Azerbaijan province, Iran.

== Demographics ==
=== Population ===
At the time of the 2006 National Census, the village's population was 460 in 89 households. The following census in 2011 counted 497 people in 103 households. The 2016 census measured the population of the village as 499 people in 108 households.
