= Qarah Qush =

Qarah Qush or Qareh Qush or Qarehqush (Persian: قره قوش), also rendered as Qara Kush, may refer to:

- Qarah Qush-e Olya
- Qarah Qush-e Sofla
