= Qezel Dash-e Olya =

Qezel Dash-e Olya قزلداش عليا
- Village
- Location within Iran
- Coordinates: 38°54′06″N 44°34′49″E
- Country: Iran
- Province: West Azerbaijan
- County: Khoy
- Bakhsh: Safayyeh
- Rural District: Sokmanabad

Population (2006)
  - Total: 326
- Time zone: UTC+3:30 (IRST)
  - Summer (DST): UTC+4:30 (IRDT)

Qezel Dash-e Olya (Persian: قزلداش عليا, also Romanized as Qezel Dāsh-e ‘Olyā; also known as Qezeldāsh-e Bālā) is a village in Sokmanabad Rural District, Safayyeh District, Khoy County, West Azerbaijan Province, Iran. At the 2006 census, its population was 326, in 64 families.
