= Qinar =

Qinar (Persian: قينر), also known as Qiz, may refer to:

- Qinar-e Olya
- Qinar-e Sofla
