= Bardarash-e Sofla =

Bardarash-e Sofla بردرش سفلي
- Village
- Location within Iran
- Coordinates: 38°41′26″N 44°22′06″E
- Country: Iran
- Province: West Azerbaijan
- County: Khoy
- Bakhsh: Safayyeh
- Rural District: Aland

Population (2006)
  - Total: 199
- Time zone: UTC+3:30 (IRST)
  - Summer (DST): UTC+4:30 (IRDT)

Bardarash-e Sofla (Persian: بردرش سفلي, also Romanized as Bardarash-e Soflá; also known as Jalālābād and Badarash-e Pā'īn) is a village in Aland Rural District, Safayyeh District, Khoy County, West Azerbaijan Province, Iran. At the 2006 census, its population was 199, in 30 families.
