= Kalvanes =

Village in West Azerbaijan province, Iran

Kalvanes Persian: كلوانس
- Village
- Location within Iran
- Coordinates: 38°43′24″N 44°41′44″E
- Country: Iran
- Province: West Azerbaijan
- County: Khoy
- District: Safayyeh
- Rural District: Sokmanabad

Population (2016)
  - Total: 1,047
- Time zone: UTC+3:30 (IRST)

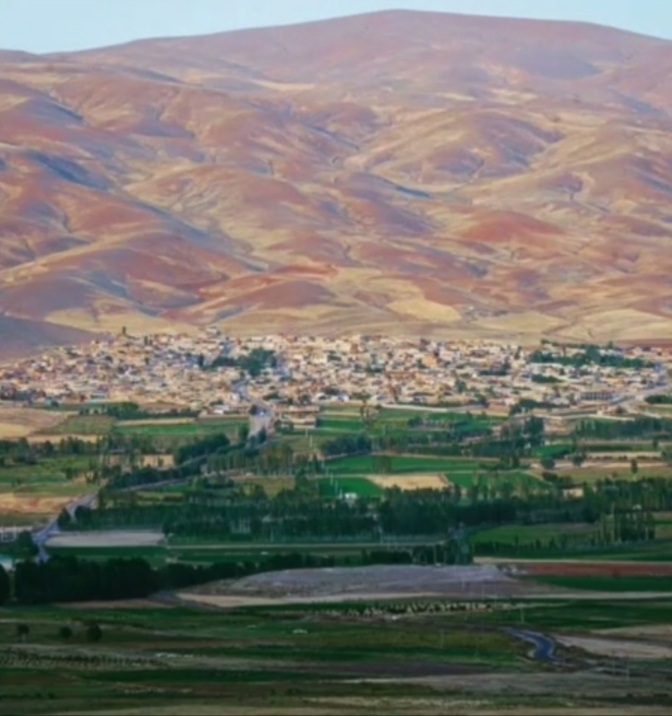
Kelvanis during the day

Kalvanes (Persian: كلوانس) (Note: Also romanized as Kalvānes and Kalavāns; also known as Galavāns) is a village in Sokmanabad Rural District of Safayyeh District in Khoy County, West Azerbaijan province, Iran.

== Demographics ==
=== Population ===
At the time of the 2006 National Census, the village's population was 1,118 in 241 households. The following census in 2011 counted 1,252 people in 324 households. The 2016 census measured the population of the village as 1,047 people in 310 households.
