= Qurdarik-e Sofla =

Qurdik Sofla قوردريك سفلي
- Village
- Location within Iran
- Coordinates: 38°41′23″N 44°45′28″E
- Country: Iran
- Province: West Azerbaijan
- County: Khoy
- Bakhsh: Safayyeh
- Rural District: Sokmanabad

Population (2006)
  - Total: 232
- Time zone: UTC+3:30 (IRST)
  - Summer (DST): UTC+4:30 (IRDT)

Qurdik-e Sofla (Persian: قوردريك سفلي, also Romanized as Qūrdīk-e Soflá; also known as Qūrdīk-e Pā'īn and Qūrdīk-e Soflá) is a village in Sokmanabad Rural District, Safayyeh District, Khoy County, West Azerbaijan Province, Iran. At the 2006 census, its population was 232, in 57 families.
