= Dizaj-e Aland =

Village in West Azerbaijan province, Iran

Dizaj-e Aland Persian: ديزج الند
- Village
- Location within Iran
- Coordinates: 38°39′31″N 44°23′52″E
- Country: Iran
- Province: West Azerbaijan
- County: Khoy
- District: Safayyeh
- Rural District: Aland

Population (2016)
  - Total: 1,249
- Time zone: UTC+3:30 (IRST)

Dizaj-e Aland (Persian: ديزج الند) (Note: Also romanized as Dīzaj-e Aland; also known as Aland) is a village in, and the former capital of, Aland Rural District in Safayyeh District of Khoy County, West Azerbaijan province, Iran. The capital of the rural district has been transferred to the village of Balesur-e Sofla.

== Demographics ==
=== Population ===
At the time of the 2006 National Census, the village's population was 1,038 in 171 households. The following census in 2011 counted 1,132 people in 235 households. The 2016 census measured the population of the village as 1,249 people in 277 households. It was the most populous village in its rural district.
