= Tavarreh, Khoy =

Tavarreh طوره
- Village
- Location within Iran
- Coordinates: 38°45′44″N 44°18′31″E
- Country: Iran
- Province: West Azerbaijan
- County: Khoy
- Bakhsh: Safayyeh
- Rural District: Aland

Population (2006)
  - Total: 557
- Time zone: UTC+3:30 (IRST)
  - Summer (DST): UTC+4:30 (IRDT)

Tavarreh (Persian: طوره, also Romanized as Ţavarreh and Ţavreh) is a village in Aland Rural District, Safayyeh District, Khoy County, West Azerbaijan Province, Iran. At the 2006 census, its population was 557, in 88 families.
