= Qurdarik =

Qurdarik (Persian: قوردريك), also rendered as Qurdik, may refer to:

- Qurdarik-e Olya
- Qurdarik-e Sofla
