= Kaput =

Village in West Azerbaijan province, Iran

Kaput Persian: كاپوت
- Village
- Location within Iran
- Coordinates: 38°50′47″N 44°27′33″E
- Country: Iran
- Province: West Azerbaijan
- County: Khoy
- District: Safayyeh
- Rural District: Sokmanabad

Population (2016)
  - Total: 764
- Time zone: UTC+3:30 (IRST)

Kaput (Persian: كاپوت) (Note: Also romanized as Kāpūt) is a village in Sokmanabad Rural District of Safayyeh District in Khoy County, West Azerbaijan province, Iran.

== Demographics ==
=== Population ===
At the time of the 2006 National Census, the village's population was 758 in 127 households. The following census in 2011 counted 798 people in 175 households. The 2016 census measured the population of the village as 764 people in 176 households.
