= Balesur =

Balesur (Persian: بلسور), also rendered as Balehsur or Balah Sur, may refer to:

- Balesur-e Olya
- Balesur-e Sofla
