= Shurik, Khoy =

Shurik شوريك
- Village
- Location within Iran
- Coordinates: 38°42′36″N 44°38′38″E
- Country: Iran
- Province: West Azerbaijan
- County: Khoy
- Bakhsh: Safayyeh
- Rural District: Sokmanabad

Population (2006)
  - Total: 354
- Time zone: UTC+3:30 (IRST)
  - Summer (DST): UTC+4:30 (IRDT)

Shurik (Persian: شوريك, also Romanized as Shūrīk; also known as Shoorik Sakaman and Shuruk) is a village in Sokmanabad Rural District, Safayyeh District, Khoy County, West Azerbaijan Province, Iran. At the 2006 census, its population was 354, in 80 families.
