= Tudan, West Azerbaijan =

Tudan تودان
- Village
- Location within Iran
- Coordinates: 38°37′22″N 44°27′06″E
- Country: Iran
- Province: West Azerbaijan
- County: Khoy
- Bakhsh: Safayyeh
- Rural District: Aland

Population (2006)
  - Total: 273
- Time zone: UTC+3:30 (IRST)
  - Summer (DST): UTC+4:30 (IRDT)

Tudan (Persian: تودان, also Romanized as Tūdān) is a village in Aland Rural District, Safayyeh District, Khoy County, West Azerbaijan Province, Iran. At the 2006 census, its population was 273, in 50 families.
