= Zaviyeh, West Azerbaijan =

Village in West Azerbaijan province, Iran

Zaviyeh Persian: زاويه
- Village
- Location within Iran
- Coordinates: 38°48′41″N 44°31′54″E
- Country: Iran
- Province: West Azerbaijan
- County: Khoy
- District: Safayyeh
- Rural District: Sokmanabad

Population (2016)
  - Total: 1,640
- Time zone: UTC+3:30 (IRST)

Zaviyeh (Persian: زاويه) (Note: Also romanized as Zāvīeh and Zāvīyeh; also known as Zāvīyeh-ye Sokmanābād, Zeiva, Zeyveh (زيوه), and Zīveh) is a village in Sokmanabad Rural District of Safayyeh District in Khoy County, West Azerbaijan province, Iran.

== Demographics ==
=== Population ===
At the time of the 2006 National Census, the village's population was 1,417 in 293 households. The following census in 2011 counted 1,603 people in 436 households. The 2016 census measured the population of the village as 1,640 people in 458 households. It was the most populous village in its rural district.
