= Qezel Dash =

Qezel Dash or Qezeldash (Persian: قزلداش) may refer to:

- Qezel Dash-e Olya
- Qezel Dash-e Sofla
