= Balesur-e Sofla =

Village in West Azerbaijan province, Iran

Balesur-e Sofla Persian: بلسور سفلي
- Village
- Location within Iran
- Coordinates: 38°41′58″N 44°20′16″E
- Country: Iran
- Province: West Azerbaijan
- County: Khoy
- District: Safayyeh
- Rural District: Aland

Population (2016)
  - Total: 1,060
- Time zone: UTC+3:30 (IRST)

Balesur-e Sofla (Persian: بلسورسفلي) (Note: Also romanized as Balesūr-e Soflá; also known as Balah Sūr and Balehsūr-e Pā'īn) is a village in, and the capital of, Aland Rural District in Safayyeh District of Khoy County, West Azerbaijan province, Iran. The previous capital of the rural district was the village of Dizaj-e Aland.

== Demographics ==
=== Population ===
At the time of the 2006 National Census, the village's population was 1,053 in 186 households. The following census in 2011 counted 1,309 people in 288 households. The 2016 census measured the population of the village as 1,060 people in 240 households.
