= Kelisa, Iran =

Kelisa (Persian: كليسا) may refer to:

- Kelisa, West Azerbaijan
- Kelisa, Zanjan
