= Qurdarik-e Olya =

Village in West Azerbaijan province, Iran

Qurdarik-e Olya Persian: قوردريك عليا
- Village
- Location within Iran
- Coordinates: 38°41′10″N 44°42′07″E
- Country: Iran
- Province: West Azerbaijan
- County: Khoy
- District: Safayyeh
- Rural District: Sokmanabad

Population (2016)
  - Total: 675
- Time zone: UTC+3:30 (IRST)

Qurdarik-e Olya (Persian: قوردريك عليا) (Note: Also romanized as Qūrdarīk-e ‘Olyā; also known as Qūrdīk-e Bālā and Qūrdīk-e ‘Olyā) is a village in Sokmanabad Rural District of Safayyeh District in Khoy County, West Azerbaijan province, Iran.

== Demographics ==
=== Population ===
At the time of the 2006 National Census, the village's population was 622 in 132 households. The following census in 2011 counted 577 people in 144 households. The 2016 census measured the population of the village as 675 people in 191 households.
