= Balesur-e Olya =

Village in West Azerbaijan province, Iran

Balesur-e Olya Persian: بلسورعليا
- Village
- Location within Iran
- Coordinates: 38°40′40″N 44°18′45″E
- Country: Iran
- Province: West Azerbaijan
- County: Khoy
- District: Safayyeh
- Rural District: Aland

Population (2016)
  - Total: 811
- Time zone: UTC+3:30 (IRST)

Balesur-e Olya (Persian: بلسورعليا) (Note: Also romanized as Balesūr-e ‘Olyā; also known as Balehsūr-e Bālā) is a village in, Aland Rural District of Safayyeh District in Khoy County, West Azerbaijan province, Iran.

== Demographics ==
=== Population ===
At the time of the 2006 National Census, the village's population was 485 in 87 households. The following census in 2011 counted 1,120 people in 243 households. The 2016 census measured the population of the village as 811 people in 171 households.
