= Bardarash-e Olya =

Village in West Azerbaijan province, Iran

Bardarash-e Olya Persian: بردرش عليا
- Village
- Location within Iran
- Coordinates: 38°42′36″N 44°22′18″E
- Country: Iran
- Province: West Azerbaijan
- County: Khoy
- District: Safayyeh
- Rural District: Aland

Population (2016)
  - Total: 395
- Time zone: UTC+3:30 (IRST)

Bardarash-e Olya (Persian: بردرش عليا) (Note: Also romanized as Bardarash-e ‘Olyā; also known as Badarash-e Bālā) is a village in, Aland Rural District of Safayyeh District in Khoy County, West Azerbaijan province, Iran.

== Demographics ==
=== Population ===
At the time of the 2006 National Census, the village's population was 471 in 87 households. The following census in 2011 counted 497 people in 104 households. The 2016 census measured the population of the village as 395 people in 93 households.
