= Shurik =

Shurik or Şurik (Persian: شوريك) may refer to:

- Shurik, North Khorasan
- Shurik, Chaypareh, West Azerbaijan Province
- Shurik, Maku, Maku County, West Azerbaijan Province
- Shurik, Khoy, West Azerbaijan Province
- Shurik, Salmas, West Azerbaijan Province
- Shurik-e Abdabad
- Shurik (Russian: Шурик), a Russian-language diminutive for the first name Alexander
  - Shurik (Gaidai), the protagonist in several Russian films directed by Leonid Gaidai

== See also ==
- Surik
