= Qinar-e Olya =

Qinar-e Olya قينرعليا
- Village
- Location within Iran
- Coordinates: 38°46′17″N 44°38′07″E
- Country: Iran
- Province: West Azerbaijan
- County: Khoy
- Bakhsh: Safayyeh
- Rural District: Sokmanabad

Population (2006)
  - Total: 184
- Time zone: UTC+3:30 (IRST)
  - Summer (DST): UTC+4:30 (IRDT)

Qinar-e Olya (Persian: قينرعليا, also Romanized as Qīnar-e ‘Olyā; also known as Qīz-e Bālā) is a village in Sokmanabad Rural District, Safayyeh District, Khoy County, West Azerbaijan Province, Iran. At the 2006 census, its population was 184, in 30 families.
