= Aq Bolagh-e Olya =

Aq Bolagh-e Olya (Persian: اق بلاغ عليا) may refer to:

- Aq Bolagh-e Olya, West Azerbaijan
- Aq Bolagh-e Olya, Zanjan
