= Chakhmaq, West Azerbaijan =

Village in West Azerbaijan province, Iran

Chakhmaq Persian: چخماق
- Village
- Location within Iran
- Coordinates: 38°44′39″N 44°21′19″E
- Country: Iran
- Province: West Azerbaijan
- County: Khoy
- District: Safayyeh
- Rural District: Aland

Population (2016)
  - Total: 300
- Time zone: UTC+3:30 (IRST)

Chakhmaq (Persian: چخماق) (Note: Also romanized as Chakhmāq) is a village in, Aland Rural District of Safayyeh District in Khoy County, West Azerbaijan province, Iran.

== Demographics ==
=== Population ===
At the time of the 2006 National Census, the village's population was 285 in 54 households. The following census in 2011 counted 319 people in 67 households. The 2016 census measured the population of the village as 300 people in 58 households.
