= Tavarreh =

Tavarreh or Tavreh (Persian: طوره) may refer to:

- Tavarreh, Khoy
- Tavreh, Showt
