= Chakhmaq =

Chakhmaq (Persian: چخماق, flint) may refer to:

- Chakhmaq, Razavi Khorasan
- Chakhmaq, West Azerbaijan
