= Tudan =

Tudan (Persian: تودان) may refer to:

- Tudan, Sistan and Baluchestan
- Tudan, West Azerbaijan
- Dyuden the Mongol ruler
