= Aq Bolagh-e Olya, West Azerbaijan =

Village in West Azerbaijan province, Iran

Aq Bolagh-e Olya Persian: اق بلاغ عليا
- Village
- Location within Iran
- Coordinates: 38°54′18″N 44°31′08″E
- Country: Iran
- Province: West Azerbaijan
- County: Khoy
- District: Safayyeh
- Rural District: Sokmanabad

Population (2016)
  - Total: 568
- Time zone: UTC+3:30 (IRST)

Aq Bolagh-e Olya (Persian: اق بلاغ عليا) (Note: Also romanized as Āq Bolāgh-e ‘Olyā; also known as Āgh Bolāgh-e ‘Olyā (غبلاغ عليا) and Āghbolāgh-e Bālā) is a village in Sokmanabad Rural District of Safayyeh District in Khoy County, West Azerbaijan province, Iran.

== Demographics ==
=== Population ===
At the time of the 2006 National Census, the village's population was 600 in 104 households. The following census in 2011 counted 574 people in 121 households. The 2016 census measured the population of the village as 568 people in 126 households.
