= Qinar-e Sofla =

Qinar-e Sofla قينرسفلي
- Village
- Location within Iran
- Coordinates: 38°47′04″N 44°37′44″E
- Country: Iran
- Province: West Azerbaijan
- County: Khoy
- Bakhsh: Safayyeh
- Rural District: Sokmanabad

Population (2006)
  - Total: 360
- Time zone: UTC+3:30 (IRST)
  - Summer (DST): UTC+4:30 (IRDT)

Qinar-e Sofla (Persian: قينرسفلي, also Romanized as Qīnar-e Soflá; also known as Qīz-e Pā'īn) is a village in Sokmanabad Rural District, Safayyeh District, Khoy County, West Azerbaijan Province, Iran. At the 2006 census, its population was 360, in 57 families.
