= Zarabad, Khoy =

City in West Azerbaijan province, Iran

Zarabad Persian: زرآباد
- City
- Location within Iran
- Coordinates: 38°48′18″N 44°35′04″E
- Country: Iran
- Province: West Azerbaijan
- County: Khoy
- District: Safayyeh
- Established as a city: 2011

Population (2016)
  - Total: 1,147
- Time zone: UTC+3:30 (IRST)

Zarabad (Persian: زور آباد) (Note: Also romanized as Zarābād; formerly known as Zurabad (زور آباد), also romanized as Zoor Abad and Zūrābād; also known as Zuhrābād) is a city in, and the capital of Safayyeh District in Khoy County, West Azerbaijan province, Iran. It also serves as the administrative center for Sokmanabad Rural District.

== Demographics ==
=== Population ===
At the time of the 2006 National Census, Zarabad's population was 917 in 197 households, when it was a village in Sokmanabad Rural District. The following census in 2011 counted 1,239 people in 310 households, by which time the village had been converted to a city. The 2016 census measured the population of the city as 1,147 people in 324 households.
