= Jang-e Sar, Salmas =

Jang-e Sar جنگ سر
- Village
- Location within Iran
- Coordinates: 38°02′07″N 44°30′53″E
- Country: Iran
- Province: West Azerbaijan
- County: Salmas
- Bakhsh: Kuhsar
- Rural District: Chahriq

Population (2006)
  - Total: 239
- Time zone: UTC+3:30 (IRST)
  - Summer (DST): UTC+4:30 (IRDT)

Jang-e Sar (Persian: جنگ سر) is a village in Chahriq Rural District, Kuhsar District, Salmas County, West Azerbaijan Province, Iran. At the 2006 census, its population was 239, in 45 families.
