= Dibak, Maku =

Dibak ديبك
- Village
- Location within Iran
- Coordinates: 39°13′33″N 44°25′02″E
- Country: Iran
- Province: West Azerbaijan
- County: Maku
- Bakhsh: Central
- Rural District: Qaleh Darrehsi

Population (2006)
  - Total: 123
- Time zone: UTC+3:30 (IRST)
  - Summer (DST): UTC+4:30 (IRDT)

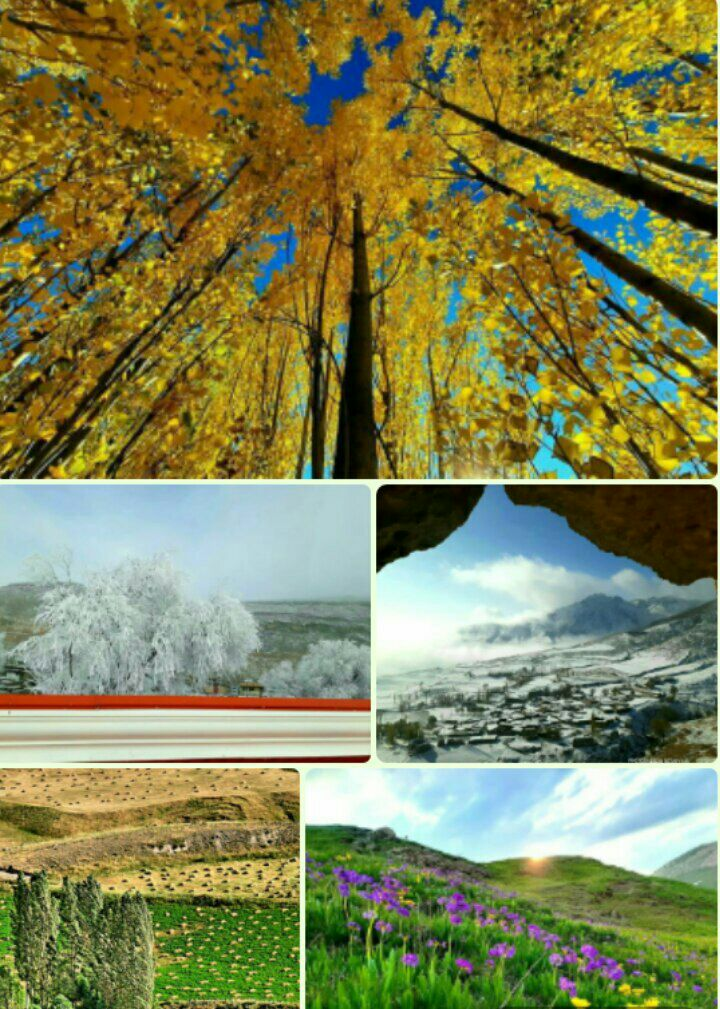
Dibak village in Maku county of Azerbaijan

Dibak (Persian: ديبك, also Romanized as Dībak) is a village in Qaleh Darrehsi Rural District, in the Central District of Maku County, West Azerbaijan Province, Iran. At the 2006 census, its population was 123, in 26 families.
