= Aland Rural District =

Rural district in West Azerbaijan province, Iran

Aland Rural District Persian: دهستان الند
- Rural District
- Location within Iran
- Coordinates: 38°41′N 44°25′E
- Country: Iran
- Province: West Azerbaijan
- County: Khoy
- District: Safayyeh
- Established: 1987
- Capital: Balesur-e Sofla

Population (2016)
  - Total: 7,071
- Time zone: UTC+3:30 (IRST)

Aland Rural District (Persian: دهستان الند) is in Safayyeh District of Khoy County, West Azerbaijan province, Iran. Its capital is the village of Balesur-e Sofla. The previous capital of the rural district was the village of Dizaj-e Aland.

== Demographics ==
=== Population ===
At the time of the 2006 National Census, the rural district's population was 7,160 in 1,273 households. There were 8,511 inhabitants in 1,837 households at the following census of 2011. The 2016 census measured the population of the rural district as 7,071 in 1,555 households. The most populous of its 23 villages was Dizaj-e Aland, with 1,249 people.

=== Other villages in the rural district ===
- Balesur-e Olya
- Bardarash-e Olya
- Chakhmaq
- Chakmeh Zar
- Karkush
- Yar Paqlu
