= Sokmanabad Rural District =

Rural district in West Azerbaijan province, Iran

Sokmanabad Rural District Persian: دهستان سكمن آباد
- Rural District
- Location within Iran
- Coordinates: 38°49′N 44°35′E
- Country: Iran
- Province: West Azerbaijan
- County: Khoy
- District: Safayyeh
- Established: 1987
- Capital: Zarabad

Population (2016)
  - Total: 11,325
- Time zone: UTC+3:30 (IRST)

Sokmanabad Rural District (Persian: دهستان سكمن آباد) is in Safayyeh District of Khoy County, West Azerbaijan province, Iran. It is administered from the city of Zarabad. (Note: Formerly Zurabad) The district is named after Sökmen II.

== Demographics ==
=== Population ===
At the time of the 2006 National Census, the rural district's population was 13,012 in 2,525 households. There were 11,808 inhabitants in 2,895 households at the following census of 2011. The 2016 census measured the population of the rural district as 11,325 in 3,014 households. The most populous of its 42 villages was Zaviyeh, with 1,640 people.

=== Other villages in the rural district ===
- Aq Bolagh-e Olya
- Aq Bolagh-e Sofla
- Kalvanes
- Kaput
- Qeris
- Qurdarik-e Olya
