= Safayyeh District =

District in West Azerbaijan province, Iran

Safayyeh District Persian: بخش صفائیه
- District
- Location within Iran
- Coordinates: 38°47′N 44°31′E
- Country: Iran
- Province: West Azerbaijan
- County: Khoy
- Established: 1997
- Capital: Zarabad

Population (2016)
  - Total: 19,543
- Time zone: UTC+3:30 (IRST)

Safayyeh District (Persian: بخش صفائیه) is in Khoy County, West Azerbaijan province, Iran. Its capital is the city of Zarabad. (Note: Formerly known as Zurabad)

== History ==
The village of Zarabad was converted to a city in 2011.

== Demographics ==
=== Population ===
At the time of the 2006 census, the district's population was 20,172 in 3,798 households. The following census in 2011 counted 21,558 people in 5,042 households. The 2016 census measured the population of the district as 19,543 inhabitants in 4,893 households.

=== Administrative divisions ===
Safayyeh District Population
Administrative Divisions	2006	2011	2016
Aland RD	7,160	8,511	7,071
Sokmanabad RD	13,012	11,808	11,325
Zarabad (city)		1,239	1,147
Total	20,172	21,558	19,543
RD = Rural District
