= Khoy County =

County in West Azerbaijan province, Iran

Khoy County Persian: شهرستان خوی
- County
- Location of Khoy County in West Azerbaijan province (top center, pink)

- Location of West Azerbaijan province in Iran
- Coordinates: 38°39′N 44°50′E
- Country: Iran
- Province: West Azerbaijan
- Capital: Khoy
- Districts: Central, Ivughli, Qotur, Safayyeh

Population (2016)
  - Total: 348,664
- Time zone: UTC+3:30 (IRST)

Khoy County (Persian: شهرستان خوی) is in West Azerbaijan province, Iran. Its capital is the city of Khoy.

== History ==
Khoy was named in ancient times for the salt mines that made it an important spur of the Silk Route. 3000 years ago, a city had existed on the area where Khoy is located nowadays, but its name became Khoy only from 14 centuries ago. In 714 BC, Sargon II passed the region of which Khoy is part of in a campaign against Urartu.

In the Parthian period, Khoy was the gateway of the Parthian Empire in the Northwest. Around 37 BC, Marc Anthony had crossed the plain that is located between Khoy and Marand during one of the many and frequent Roman–Parthian Wars.

One of the important historic elements of the city's Khoy in the county is the St. Sourp Sarkis church, one of the many churches in the county. Armenian documents wrote that the date of the making has to be either 332 or 333 AD. In the city of Khoy and its surrounding villages, churches are seen and it is reported that Armenians have always been comprising a significant amount of the city's population, but the city was never an "Armenian city" (as in comprising a vast majority).

=== Modern period ===
Khoy city was fortified at various times in its history, most recently by the Qajar dynasty in the nineteenth century.

After the death of Nadir Shah Afshar in 1747, Khoy and its immediate surroundings broke away from central government of Iran like several other regions of Iran, including what is now Georgia and some of the northern Caucasian Khanates comprising the northwestern territories of Iran.

Khoy became the centre of the newly established Khanate of Khoy (1747–1813) which was loyal to the central government only when it was powerful (like during Karim Khan's reign), and autonomous when the central role was weak. The return of Khoy to the central government of Iran was during the beginning of Qajar period during Agha Mohammad Khan's reign.

Khoy was attacked in 1827 by the Russian Empire who was attempting to seize the last of the Caucasian territories of Iran comprising Armenia and what is now Azerbaijan during the Russo-Persian War (1826–1828). The war, which mainly razed in the extremely nearby South Caucasus region eventually happened to moved deeper south as well.

Until 1828, Khoy had a large number of Armenians, however, the Treaty of Turkmenchay following the outcome of the 1826–1828 war and the victory over the neighbouring Ottoman Empire as concluded in the Treaty of Adrianople, encouraged the mass resettlement of Armenians from both Turkey and Iran in the Russian-controlled territory of modern Armenia. In the mid-1800s some of them immigrated to eastern Armenia, which by then had just become part of the Russian Empire. However, a small Armenian population remains living in Khoy city and county.

Eli Smith notes in his "Missionary Researches in Armenia: Including a Journey through Asia Minor, an into Georgia and Persia" released in 1834 that he and his group had heard while passing through Khoy that the city had between 4000 and 7000 Muslim families, while only about 100 Armenian families were left. He noted further that in the immediate villages around Khoy city there were a few more Armenians, but the vast majority had migrated to the north of the Aras river following Russia's victory over Persia in 1828 and the encouraged settling in the newly incorporated Russian regions of Eastern Armenia.

In 1911 Khoy was occupied by Ottoman troops, followed in World War I by Russian troops, who withdrew in 1917. In World War II it was again occupied by Soviet troops, who remained until 1946.

=== Administrative history ===
In 2007, the villages of Dizaj Diz and Qotur were converted to cities. In addition, Chaypareh District was separated from the county in the establishment of Chaypareh County. The village of Zarabad (Note: Formerly known as Zurabad) became a city in 2011.

== Demographics ==
=== Language ===
Today, Khoy County is mainly populated by Azerbaijani people. The Armenians and Assyrians have largely fled and left the region due to massacres before and after the First World War.

=== Population ===
At the time of the 2006 census, the county's population was 365,573 in 85,550 households. The following census in 2011 counted 354,309 people in 96,367 households. The 2016 census measured the population of the county as 348,664 in 101,130 households.

=== Administrative divisions ===
Khoy County's population history and administrative structure over three consecutive censuses are shown in the following table.

Khoy County population
Administrative divisions	2006	2011	2016
Central District	260,854	288,565	288,269
Dizaj RD	17,516	19,493	19,681
Firuraq RD	13,116	13,708	14,219
Gowharan RD	9,821	10,799	11,161
Qarah Su RD	17,600	9,977	10,271
Rahal RD	16,190	16,897	16,620
Dizaj Diz (city)		7,896	8,282
Firuraq (city)	7,903	8,837	9,190
Khoy (city)	178,708	200,958	198,845
Chaypareh District (Note: Transferred to Chaypareh County)	42,225		
Churs RD	4,995		
Qarah Zia ol Din RD	5,785		
Hajjilar RD	8,856		
Qarah Zia ol Din (city)	22,589		
Ivughli District	17,915	17,603	16,259
Ivughli RD	8,413	8,489	7,303
Valdian RD	6,220	5,947	5,636
Ivughli (city)	3,282	3,167	3,320
Qotur District	24,407	26,583	24,591
Qotur RD	14,894	12,448	11,105
Zeri RD	9,513	9,472	8,339
Qotur (city)		4,663	5,147
Safayyeh District	20,172	21,558	19,543
Aland RD	7,160	8,511	7,071
Sokmanabad RD	13,012	11,808	11,325
Zarabad (city)		1,239	1,147
Total	365,573	354,309	348,664
RD = Rural District

== Geography and climate ==
Khoy is located in the mountains, so the weather is very cold in winter and cool in summer. Spring weather in this city is very pleasant. The city is located in the vicinity of mountains such as Chelekhaneh Mount and Avrin Mount (The highest mountain of West Azarbaijan Province).

== Transportation ==
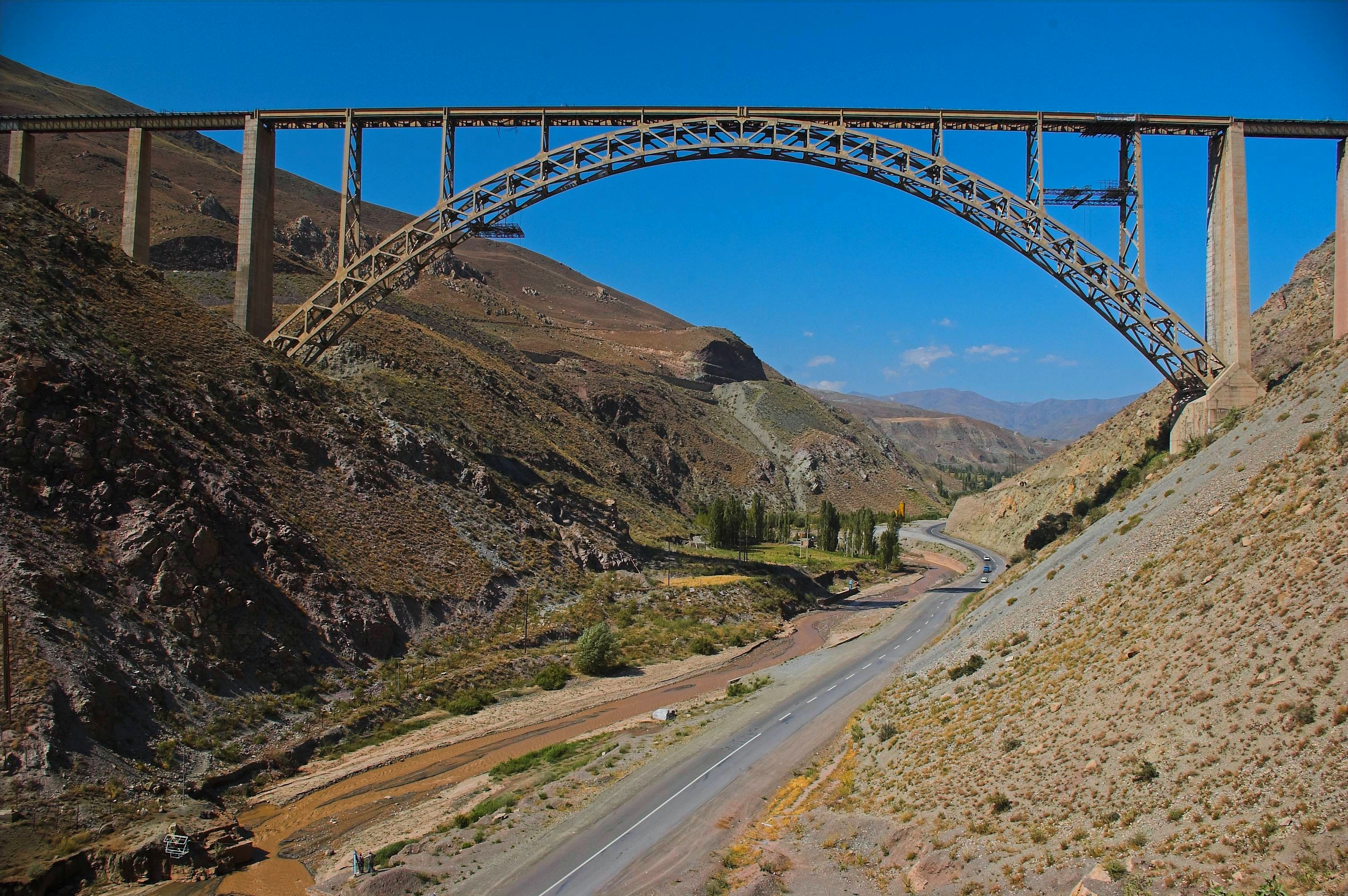
Pol havai - railway bridge Khoy

=== Airlines and destinations ===
Khoy Airport (IATA: KHY, ICAO: OITK) is an airport and bus station in Khoy, Iran.

Airlines	Destinations
Iran Aseman Airlines	Tehran-Mehrabad

== Tourism ==
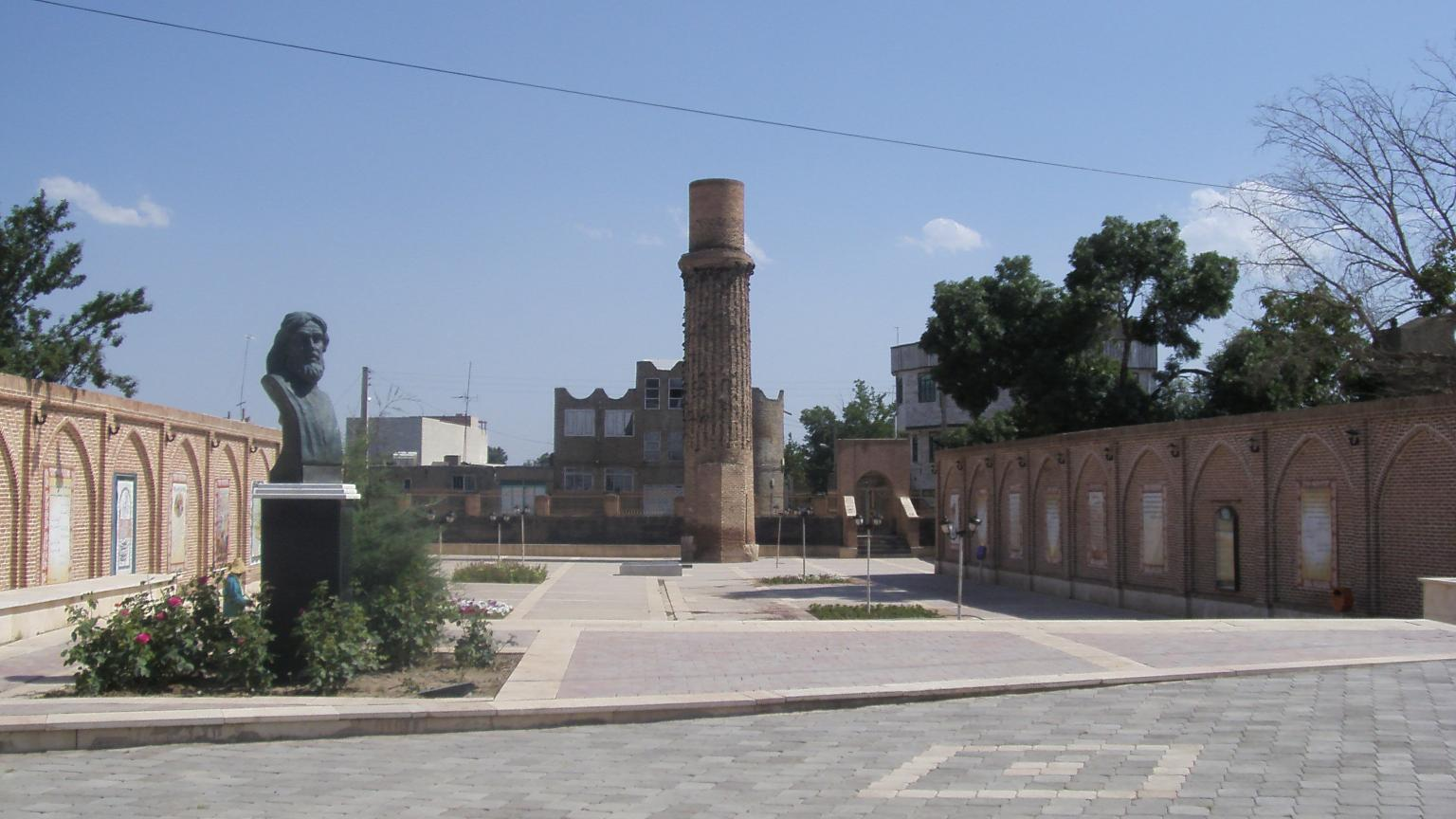
Tomb of Shams Tabrizi 9

It is well known for the tomb of Shams Tabrizi, renowned Iranian poet.

== Gallery ==
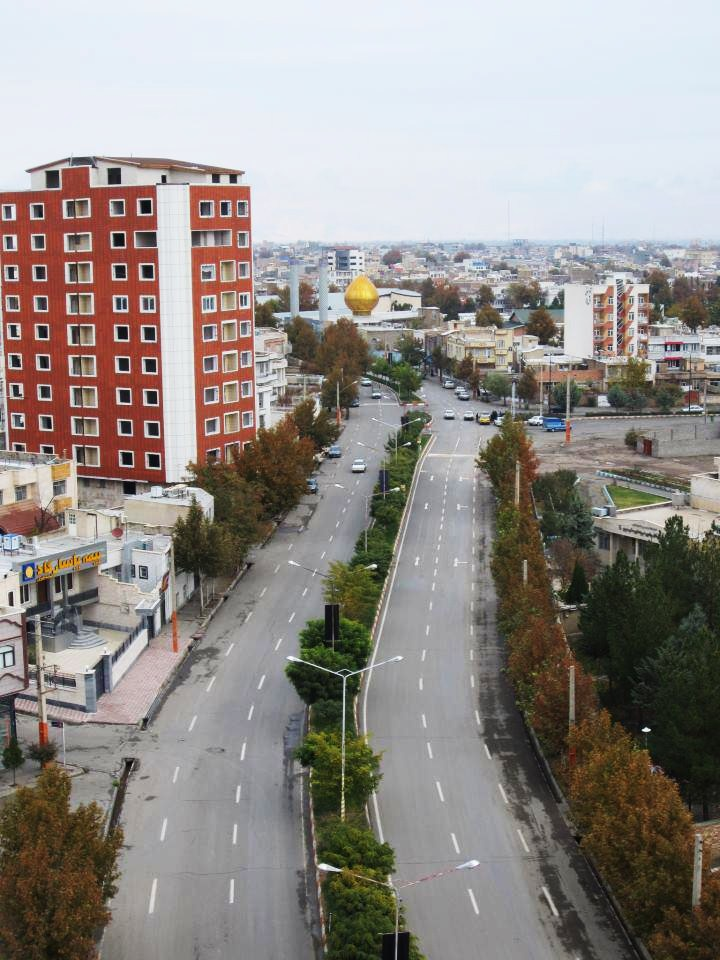

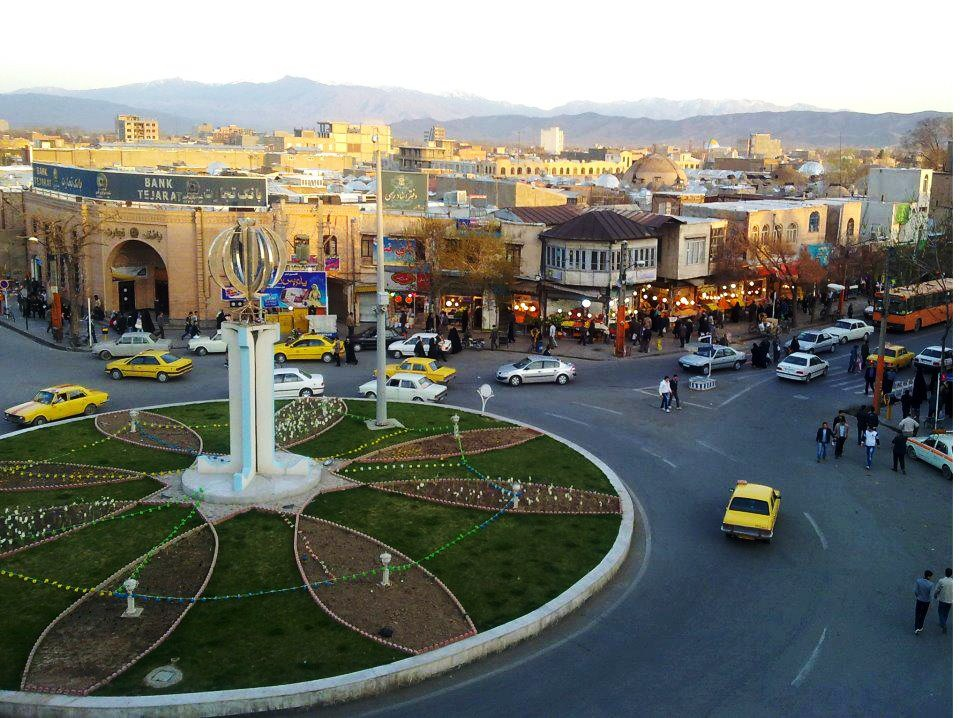

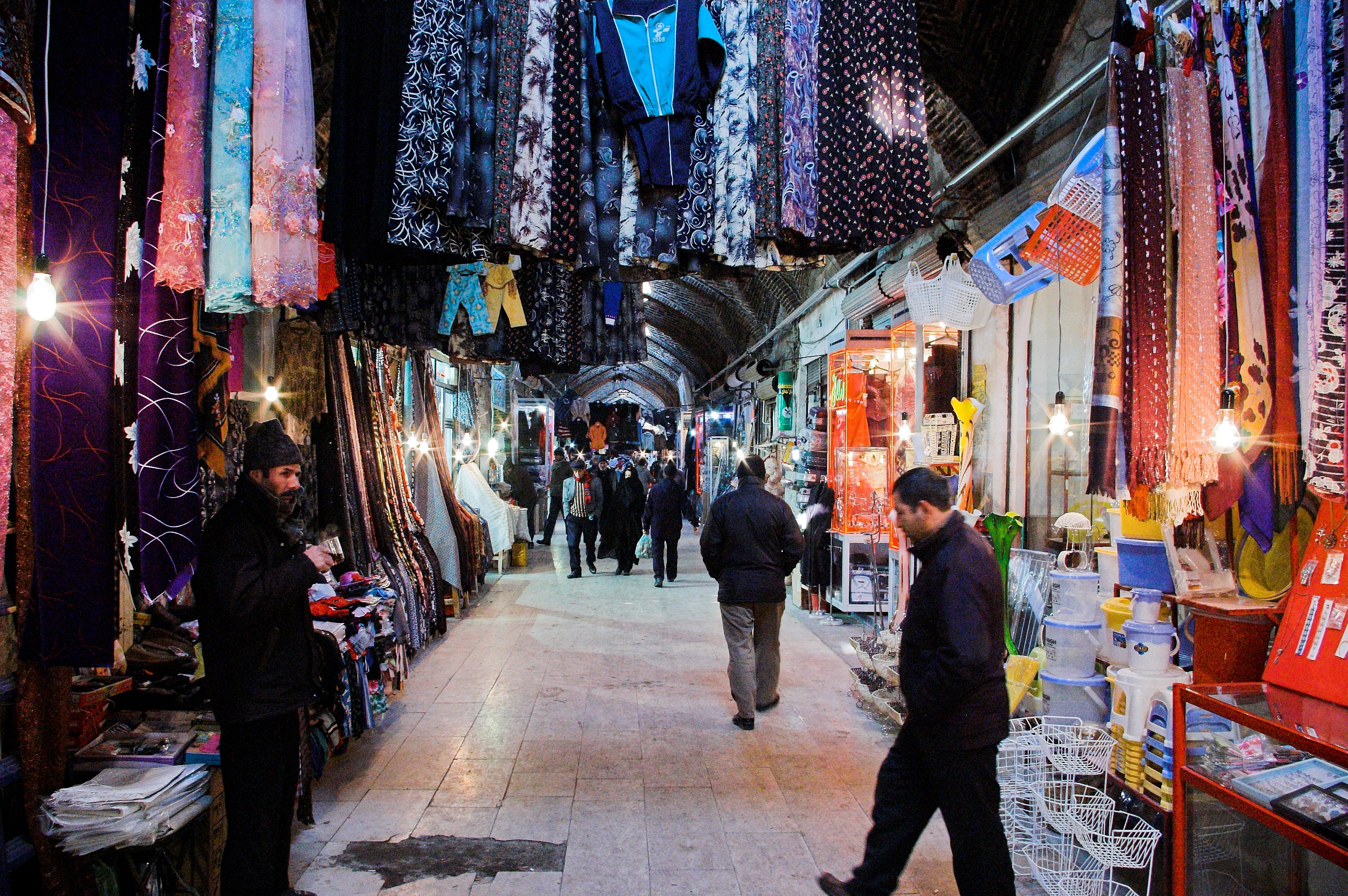

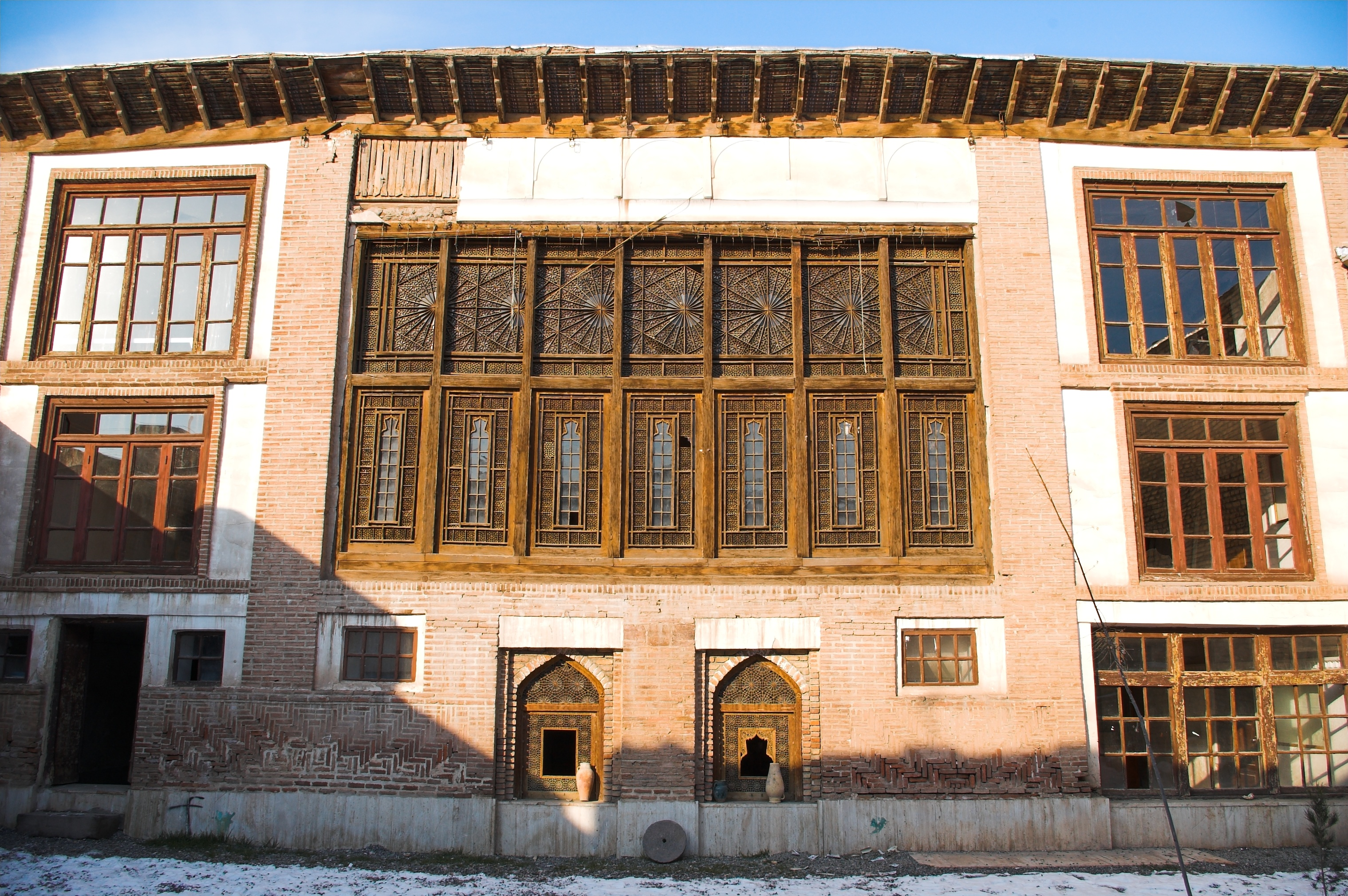

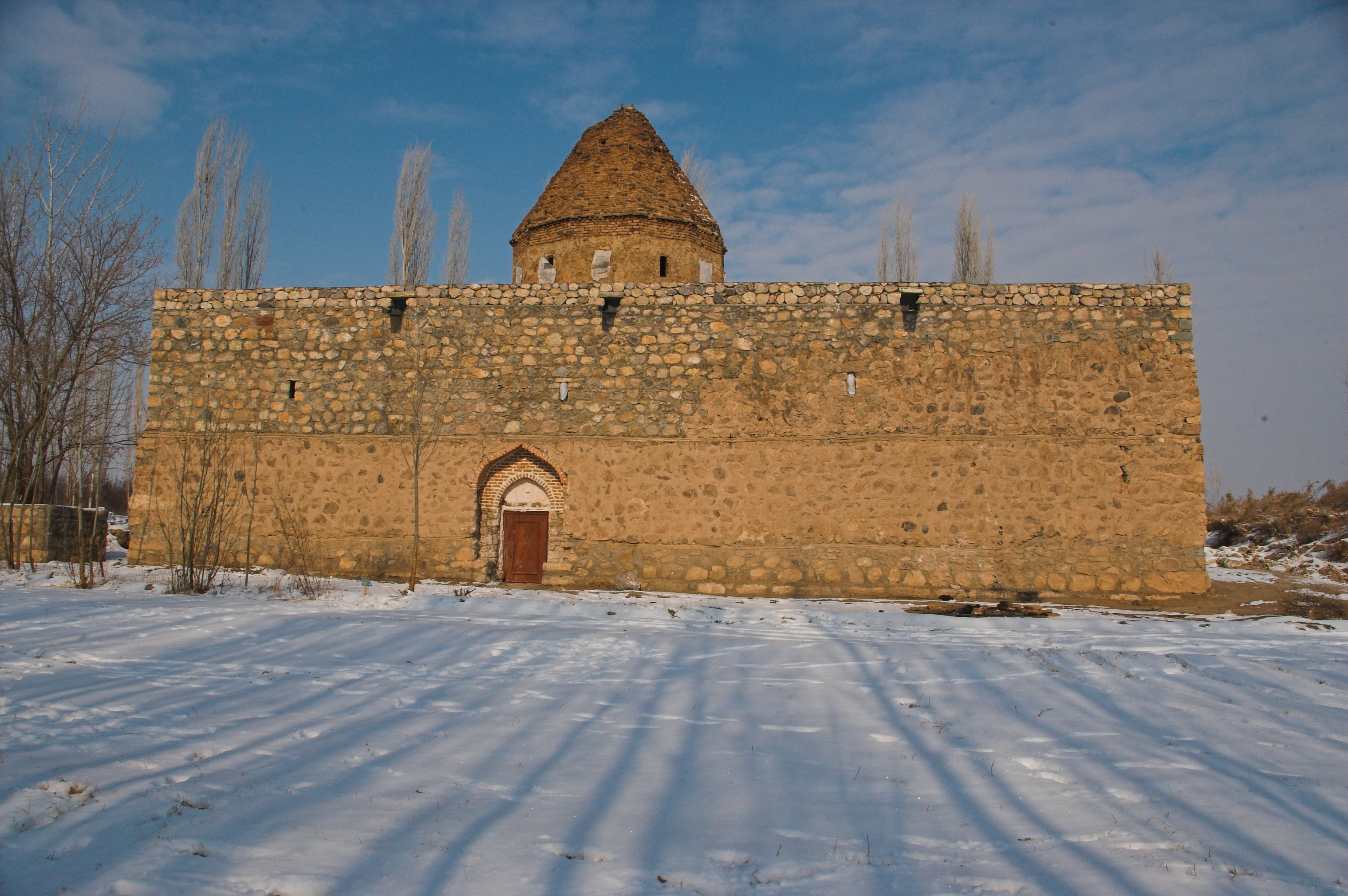

== See also ==
Media related to Khoy County at Wikimedia Commons
