= Khanate of Karganrud =

Khanate of Karganrud خانات کرگان‌رود (Persian) Khānāt-e Kargānrūd (Persian)
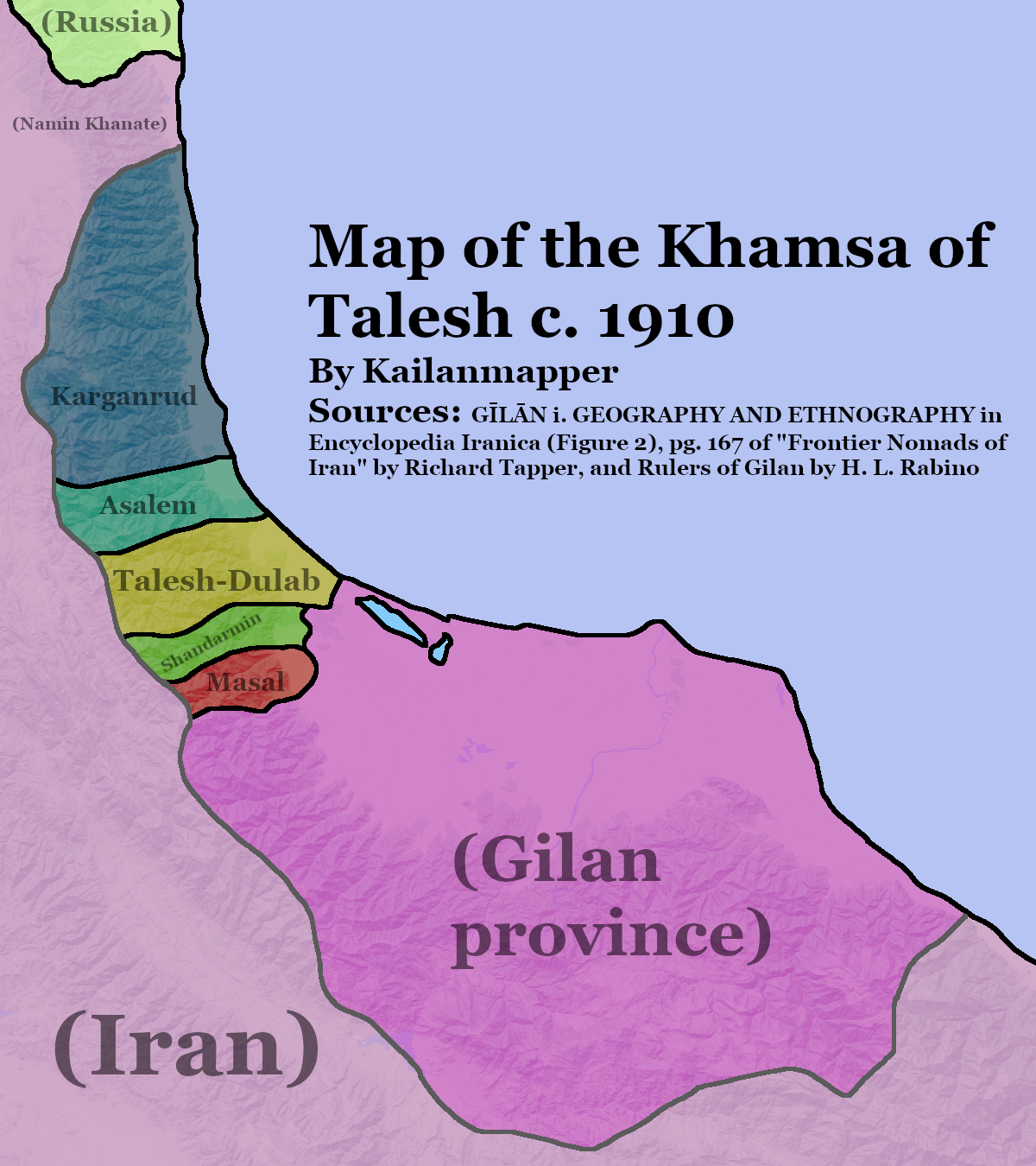
- Map of the Khamsa of Talesh, with Karganrud in blue.
- Capital: Rik
- Common languages: Persian; Talysh; Azerbaijani
- Ethnic groups: Talysh; Turks
- Government: Khanate
- Establishment: 1813
Preceded by	Succeeded by
Talysh Khanate	Russian Empire
- Today part of: Iran

The Khanate of Kargan-Rud (Persian: خانات کرگان‌رود, romanized: Khānāt-e Kargānrūd), also known as Karganrud or Korganrud, was the largest and northernmost of the Khamsa of Talish (Persian: خمسهٔ طوالش, romanized: Khamseh-ye Ṭavālesh).

== History ==
=== Origins and establishment ===
Mir Mostafa Khan's descendants claimed the Karganrud dynasty originated from a certain Mirakhur (master of the horse), who served Mir Mostafa Khan. In contrast, the Khans of Karganrud traced their descent from the Ashik Harazur, a clan of Georgian or Armenian origin. They argued that their ancestors had controlled the district since the 15th century.

After the Russo-Iranian War, in order to weaken the power of Mir Mostafa Khan, Fath 'Ali Shah divided Persian Talish and distributed it among five local families (Karganrud, Asalem, Talesh Dulab, Shandarmin, and Masal), thus creating the Khamsa of Talish. He gave each of them khans and they were all charged with protecting the frontier against Mir Mostafa Khan's incursions. They were placed under the administration of Gilan instead of Azerbaijan, the khans of Karganrud and Asalem fearing conflict with the khans of Namin.

=== Continued fratricide ===
H. L. Rabino gives the following description of the Karganrud family:

"The latter history of the Khans of Karganrud is one of murder, rapine, and oppression. Fratricide was common amongst them, and down to 50 years ago few of them died a natural death."

At the time of James Fraser's visit to the region in 1822, Bala Khan was the ruler of Karganrud. He reigned until 1848, when he was murdered by his nephew. Bala Khan's son, Farajollah Khan Sartip, replaced him. Farajollah Khan Sartip reigned from 1848 to 1865, when he was murdered by his brother. The Shah sentenced the murderer and four of his brothers to death, and Habibullah Khan succeeded his father as khan. In 1867–68, Habibullah Khan was succeeded by Nosratollah Khan 'Amid al-Soltaneh, also known by his honorific of Sardar Amjad. Sardar Amjad built two huge palaces, one in Rik and the other in Aq Evlar. They were well-built brickworks with two stories, semicircle arches, and windows.

=== During the Constitutional Revolution ===
The Khans of Karganrud reacted negatively to the Persian Constitutional Revolution. Sardar Amjad's son, Arfa' al-Soltaneh, a principal landowner, oppressed those supporting the Constitutionalists. He arrested many peasants - including women and young children, who had supported the movement, and confiscated their property, declaring "Anyone who speaks of anjumans and the Constitution will have his mouth sewn."

In the summer of 1906, many people complained of oppression to the Anzali anjoman. Members of the anjoman visited Karganrud to verify their claims. Shortly after their visit, Arfa' al-Soltaneh began to harass the peasantry. However, the people fought back and rose against Arfa' al-Soltaneh and Sardar Amjad, burned their property, and forced them to flee, taking control of the district by the summer of 1907. Hasan 'Ali Khan, a government official sent to crush the rebellion, stated that the conflict killed 50 to 60 people, and that the bureau of the Russian citizen, Stephan Lianozov, was ransacked. The magnificent palaces Sardar Amjad built were destroyed in the process and remained ruined until the reign of Mohammad Reza Shah.

In September 1908, Sardar Amjad and the governor of Gilan, Sardar Afkham, made an attempt to reconquer Talish with a force 1,000 infantry and cavalry, in addition to 2 cannons. The soldiers suffered from low morale, and after a march of six weeks, were thoroughly beaten back by the locals using guerrilla warfare. One soldier remarked "We saw no one, but a hundred bullets rained on us".

In February 1909, Rasht was occupied by the Constitutionalists, killing Sardar Afkham; this momentum eventually resulted in the fall of Tehran in July 1909. Protests by the population continued until Russian forces occupied Gilan in December 1911, with the Russian consul Nekrasov threatening greater devastation if they did not give up their strikes. In 1912, with the support of the Russians, Arfa' al-Soltaneh was able to return to Karganrud to reign. The local residents were forced to give their taxes through the Russian legation.

== Territory, administration and government ==
H. L. Rabino describes Karganrud as being subdivided into the following districts (Persian: ناحیه, romanized: nāḥia): Otaqsara, Lisar va Hareh Dasht, and Haviq va Chubar, bordering the district of Astara. Rik was the traditional residence of the Khans of Karganrud, in addition to being the center of Otaqsara. They resided there in the winter and would move to Aq Evlar in the summer.

=== Settlements of Karganrud ===
This is a list of settlements in Karganrud, according to Rabino.

Qeshlaq villages	Yaylaq villages
Bouzek	'Aindeh
Chavachou	Bask
Shekardasht	Chalevecht
Shirabad	Da'avan
Jamkuh	Dervichebon
Jow Kandan	Dizgah
Jowlandan	Ganjkhaneh
Eivik	Hive
Guerdbedjar	Irbou
Guerdab-Ouzoun	Kal'efou
Hashtpar	Kouhbazar
Hareh Dasht	Loroun
Haviq	Makach
Kal'ebon	Marian
Ketese	Mian Kuh
Kerganrud	Navan
Khalifekeri	Now Deh
Khadjekeri	Razan
Khotbeh Sara	Raze
Lemir	Rik
Lisar	Sarasar
Mahmudabad	Takhtparou
Maryan	Timdasht
Naseri	Touledje
Nowmandan	Toupalli
Nosratabad	Toul-e Gilan
Ooulebedjar	Zalbil Astane
Pasil-Tazeabad	
Poshteh	
Rik	
Seyyed Niki	
Sourepocht	
Tanguedei	
Tare	
Chubar	
Tula Rud	
Vazneh Sar	

== Foreign relations ==
To the north, the Khanate of Karganrud had a bitter rivalry with the Khanate of Namin, ruled by descendants of the Khans of Talysh. Karganrud itself was formerly subordinate to the Namin khans' ancestors, but were separated from them by Fath 'Ali Shah. He also ordered Bala Khan of Karganrud to attack Mir Hasan Khan, son of Mir Mostafa Khan. Bala Khan complied, and sacked Hasan Khan's residence at Namin.

Mir Hasan Khan submitted to the Shah, marrying one of his daughters, which worried the khans of Karganrud and Asalem that he would seek vengeance on them using the governor of Azerbaijan. As a result, they successfully petitioned the Shah to have Talesh included within the province of Gilan, not Azerbaijan. However, the khans of Karganrud owed only nominal allegiance to the governor of Gilan.

To the south, the Khans of Karganrud had the primary position in the region in comparison with the other Talish Khanates. The khans of Asalem, Talesh-Dulab, Masal, and Shandarmin were in a subordinate, oppressive relationship with the Khans of Karganrud.

== Geography, society and population ==
The area of Talesh was well known for its vast jungles, rice, and silk cocoons. Most of the population of Karganrud was of Sunni faith; the only exceptions being the Khan himself, along with the people of Lisar and Hareh Dasht, who were Shi'ites. In 1922, Karganrud was described as being a half-Sunni, half-Shia region. Its population was estimated at 15,000. The district could supply around 1,000 armed men.

== Rulers ==
Ruler	Reign
Bala Khan ibn 'Ali ibn Guna ibn Ebrahim ibn Guna ibn Hosayn بالا خان بن علی بن گونه بن ابراهیم بن گونه بن حسین	1813 - 1848
Farajollah Khan Sartip فرج‌الله خان سرتیپ	1848 - 1865
Habibullah Khan حبیب‌الله خان	1865 - 1867/68
"Sardar-i Amjad" Nosratollah Khan 'Amid al-Soltaneh "سردار امجد" نصرت‌الله خان عمیدالسلطنه	1867/68 - 1907
Arfa' al-Soltaneh ارفع‌السلطنه	1912 - ?
