= Dirakari =

Village in Gilan province, Iran

Dirakari Persian: ديراكري
- Village
- Location within Iran
- Coordinates: 37°53′45″N 48°55′00″E
- Country: Iran
- Province: Gilan
- County: Talesh
- District: Jokandan
- Rural District: Nilrud

Population (2016)
  - Total: 402
- Time zone: UTC+3:30 (IRST)

Dirakari (Persian: ديراكري) (Note: Also romanized as Deyrā Karī and Dīrākarī) is a village in Nilrud Rural District of Jokandan District in Talesh County, Gilan province, Iran.

== Demographics ==
=== Language ===
Linguistic composition of the village.

Dirakari linguistic composition
language	percent
Talysh	70%
Azerbaijani	20%
New Persian	10%

=== Population ===
At the time of the 2006 National Census, the village's population was 315 in 76 households, when it was in Saheli-ye Jokandan Rural District of the Central District. The following census in 2011 counted 314 people in 87 households. The 2016 census measured the population of the village as 402 people in 124 households.

In 2024, the rural district was separated from the district in the formation of Jokandan District, and Dirakari was transferred to Nilrud Rural District created in the new district.
