= Tula Rud =

Tula Rud (Persian: طولا رود) may refer to:

- Tula Rud-e Bala
- Tula Rud-e Pain
- Tula Rud Rural District
