= Titak =

Village in Gilan province, Iran

Titak Persian: تی تک
- Village, Suburb
- Location within Iran
- Coordinates: 37°49′23″N 48°53′58″E
- Country: Iran
- Province: Gilan
- County: Talesh
- District: Jokandan
- Rural District: Saheli-ye Jokandan

Population (2016)
  - Total: 0
- Time zone: UTC+3:30 (IRST)

Titak (Persian: تیتک) (Note: Also romanized as Tītak; also known as Tītaq and Tūtak) is a village in Saheli-ye Jokandan Rural District of Jokandan District in Talesh County, Gilan province, Iran. It is a northern suburb of the city of Tālesh.

== Demographics ==
=== Population ===
At the time of the 2006 National Census, the village's population was 1,022 in 246 households, when it was in the Central District. The village did not appear in the following census of 2011. The 2016 census measured the population of the village as zero, as the residential area of the village became part of Tālesh city's urban area.

In 2024, the rural district was separated from the district in the formation of Jokandan District.
