= Tarshabur =

Tarshabur ترشابور
- Village
- Location within Iran
- Coordinates: 37°47′18″N 48°54′50″E
- Country: Iran
- Province: Gilan
- County: Talesh
- Bakhsh: Central
- City: Talesh

Population (2006)
  - Total: 1,675
- Time zone: UTC+3:30 (IRST)

Tarshabur (Persian: ترشابور, also Romanized as Tarshābūr; also known as Torshābūr-e Ţūlārūd-e Bālā) is a neighborhood in the city of Hashtpar in Talesh County, Gilan Province, Iran. It is southern suburb of the city.

It was formerly a village in Tula Rud Rural District, in the Central District of the county. At the 2006 census, its population was 1,675, in 404 families. Tarshabur was incorporated into Talesh urban area between 2006 and 2011.
