= Qanbar Mahalleh, Talesh =

Village in Gilan province, Iran

Qanbar Mahalleh Persian: قنبرمحله
- Village
- Location within Iran
- Coordinates: 37°54′32″N 48°54′27″E
- Country: Iran
- Province: Gilan
- County: Talesh
- District: Jokandan
- Rural District: Nilrud

Population (2016)
  - Total: 954
- Time zone: UTC+3:30 (IRST)

Qanbar Mahalleh (Persian: قنبرمحله) (Note: Also romanized as Qanbar Maḩalleh) is a village in Nilrud Rural District of Jokandan District in Talesh County, Gilan province, Iran.

== Demographics ==
=== Language ===
Linguistic composition of the village.

Qanbar Mahalleh linguistic composition
language	percent
Talysh	70%
Azerbaijani	20%
New Persian	10%

=== Population ===
At the time of the 2006 National Census, the village's population was 867 in 196 households, when it was in Saheli-ye Jokandan Rural District of the Central District. The following census in 2011 counted 1,012 people in 270 households. The 2016 census measured the population of the village as 954 people in 281 households.

In 2024, the rural district was separated from the district in the formation of Jokandan District, and Qanbar Mahalleh was transferred to Nilrud Rural District created in the new district.
