= Dizgah Mahalleh =

Village in Gilan province, Iran

Dizgah Mahalleh Persian: ديزگاه محله
- Village
- Location within Iran
- Coordinates: 37°54′39″N 48°53′38″E
- Country: Iran
- Province: Gilan
- County: Talesh
- District: Jokandan
- Rural District: Nilrud

Population (2016)
  - Total: 514
- Time zone: UTC+3:30 (IRST)

Dizgah Mahalleh (Persian: ديزگاه محله) (Note: Also romanized as Dīzgāh Maḩalleh) is a village in Nilrud Rural District of Jokandan District in Talesh County, Gilan province, Iran.

== Demographics ==
=== Language ===
Linguistic composition of the village.

Dizgah Mahalleh linguistic composition
language	percent
Talysh	75%
Azerbaijani	15%
New Persian	10%

=== Population ===
At the time of the 2006 National Census, the village's population was 517 in 115 households, when it was in Saheli-ye Jokandan Rural District of the Central District. The following census in 2011 counted 541 people in 150 households. The 2016 census measured the population of the village as 514 people in 148 households.

In 2024, the rural district was separated from the district in the formation of Jokandan District, and Dizgah Mahalleh was transferred to Nilrud Rural District created in the new district.
