= Khvajeh Geri =

Village in Gilan province, Iran

Khvajeh Geri Persian: خواجه گري
- Village
- Location within Iran
- Coordinates: 37°52′51″N 48°55′15″E
- Country: Iran
- Province: Gilan
- County: Talesh
- District: Jokandan
- Rural District: Nilrud

Population (2016)
  - Total: 662
- Time zone: UTC+3:30 (IRST)

Khvajeh Geri (Persian: خواجه گري) (Note: Also romanized as Khvājeh Gerī; also known as Khadzha-Kiri, Khajeh Karī, Khoja Kiri, Khvāja Kiri, Khvājeh Karī, and Khvājeh Kerī) is a village in Nilrud Rural District of Jokandan District in Talesh County, Gilan province, Iran.

== Demographics ==
=== Language ===
Linguistic composition of the village.

Khvajeh Geri linguistic composition
language	percent
Talysh	70%
Azerbaijani	20%
New Persian	10%

=== Population ===
At the time of the 2006 National Census, the village's population was 668 in 143 households, when it was in Saheli-ye Jokandan Rural District of the Central District. The following census in 2011 counted 675 people in 180 households. The 2016 census measured the population of the village as 662 people in 195 households.

In 2024, the rural district was separated from the district in the formation of Jokandan District, and Khvajeh Geri was transferred to Nilrud Rural District created in the new district.
