= Tork Mahalleh, Talesh =

Village in Gilan province, Iran

Tork Mahalleh Persian: ترك محله
- Village
- Location within Iran
- Coordinates: 37°53′39″N 48°53′10″E
- Country: Iran
- Province: Gilan
- County: Talesh
- District: Jokandan
- Rural District: Nilrud

Population (2016)
  - Total: 393
- Time zone: UTC+3:30 (IRST)

Tork Mahalleh (Persian: ترك محله) (Note: Also romanized as Tark Maḩalleh and Tork Maḩalleh; also known as Tarka Mahalleh, Tarka-Makhallekh, Tarkeh Maḩalleh, and Torkeh Maḩalleh) is a village in Nilrud Rural District of Jokandan District in Talesh County, Gilan province, Iran.

== Demographics ==
=== Language ===
Linguistic composition of the village.

Tork Mahalleh, Talesh linguistic composition
language	percent
Azerbaijani	75%
Talysh	15%
New Persian	10%

=== Population ===
At the time of the 2006 National Census, the village's population was 317 in 69 households, when it was in Saheli-ye Jokandan Rural District of the Central District. The following census in 2011 counted 359 people in 100 households. The 2016 census measured the population of the village as 393 people in 112 households.

In 2024, the rural district was separated from the district in the formation of Jokandan District, and Tork Mahalleh was transferred to Nilrud Rural District created in the new district.
