= Sheykh Mahalleh, Talesh =

Village in Gilan province, Iran

Sheykh Mahalleh Persian: شيخ محله
- Village
- Location within Iran
- Coordinates: 37°52′26″N 48°54′21″E
- Country: Iran
- Province: Gilan
- County: Talesh
- District: Jokandan
- Rural District: Nilrud

Population (2016)
  - Total: 879
- Time zone: UTC+3:30 (IRST)

Sheykh Mahalleh (Persian: شيخ محله) (Note: Also romanized as Sheykh Maḩalleh; also known as Shaikh Mahalleh and Sheikh-Makhallekh) is a village in Nilrud Rural District of Jokandan District in Talesh County, Gilan province, Iran.

== Demographics ==
=== Population ===
At the time of the 2006 National Census, the village's population was 776 in 176 households, when it was in Saheli-ye Jokandan Rural District of the Central District. The following census in 2011 counted 853 people in 224 households. The 2016 census measured the population of the village as 879 people in 252 households.

In 2024, the rural district was separated from the district in the formation of Jokandan District, and Sheykh Mahalleh was transferred to Nilrud Rural District created in the new district.
