= Siah Gol, Gilan =

Village in Gilan province, Iran

Siah Gol Persian: سياهگل
- Village
- Location within Iran
- Coordinates: 37°54′00″N 48°53′34″E
- Country: Iran
- Province: Gilan
- County: Talesh
- District: Jokandan
- Rural District: Nilrud

Population (2016)
  - Total: 739
- Time zone: UTC+3:30 (IRST)

Siah Gol (Persian: سياهگل) (Note: Also romanized as Sīāh Gol; also known as Sīāh Kal and Sīāhkat) is a village in Nilrud Rural District of Jokandan District in Talesh County, Gilan province, Iran.

== Demographics ==
=== Language ===
Linguistic composition of the village.

Siah Gol linguistic composition
language	percent
Talysh	70%
Azerbaijani	15%
New Persian	10%

=== Population ===
At the time of the 2006 National Census, the village's population was 533 in 121 households, when it was in Saheli-ye Jokandan Rural District of the Central District. The following census in 2011 counted 664 people in 188 households. The 2016 census measured the population of the village as 739 people in 216 households.

In 2024, the rural district was separated from the district in the formation of Jokandan District, and Siah Gol was transferred to Nilrud Rural District created in the new district.
