= Hasan Dayerman =

Hasan Dayerman حسن دايرمان
- Village
- Location within Iran
- Coordinates: 37°51′01″N 48°37′08″E
- Country: Iran
- Province: Gilan
- County: Talesh
- Bakhsh: Central
- Rural District: Kuhestani-ye Talesh

Population (2006)
  - Total: 124
- Time zone: UTC+3:30 (IRST)
  - Summer (DST): UTC+4:30 (IRDT)

Hasan Dayerman (Persian: حسن دايرمان, also Romanized as Ḩasan Dāyermān; also known as Ḩasan Darmānī and Ḩasan Dāyer Mānī) is a village in Kuhestani-ye Talesh Rural District, in the Central District of Talesh County, Gilan Province, Iran. At the 2006 census, its population was 124, in 31 families.

== Language ==
Linguistic composition of the village.

Hasan Dayerman linguistic composition
language	percent
Azerbaijani	70%
Talysh	30%
