= Kuakari =

Village in Gilan province, Iran

Kuakari Persian: كواكري
- Village
- Location within Iran
- Coordinates: 37°49′54″N 48°55′32″E
- Country: Iran
- Province: Gilan
- County: Talesh
- District: Jokandan
- Rural District: Saheli-ye Jokandan

Population (2016)
  - Total: 354
- Time zone: UTC+3:30 (IRST)

Kuakari (Persian: كواكري) (Note: Also romanized as Kūākarī; also known as Kūhakarī) is a village in Saheli-ye Jokandan Rural District of Jokandan District in Talesh County, Gilan province, Iran.

== Demographics ==
=== Population ===
At the time of the 2006 National Census, the village's population was 286 in 75 households, when it was in the Central District. The following census in 2011 counted 289 people in 87 households. The 2016 census measured the population of the village as 354 people in 108 households.

In 2024, the rural district was separated from the district in the formation of Jokandan District.
