= Rahnama Mahalleh =

Village in Gilan province, Iran

Rahnama Mahalleh Persian: راهنمامحله
- Village
- Location within Iran
- Coordinates: 37°49′24″N 48°56′12″E
- Country: Iran
- Province: Gilan
- County: Talesh
- District: Central
- Rural District: Tula Rud

Population (2016)
  - Total: 753
- Time zone: UTC+3:30 (IRST)

Rahnama Mahalleh (Persian: راهنمامحله) (Note: Also romanized as Rahnamā Maḩalleh) is a village in Tula Rud Rural District of the Central District in Talesh County, Gilan province, Iran.

== Demographics ==
=== Population ===
At the time of the 2006 National Census, the village's population was 583 in 140 households, when it was in Saheli-ye Jokandan Rural District. The following census in 2011 counted 648 people in 197 households. The 2016 census measured the population of the village as 753 people in 214 households.

Rahnama Mahalleh was transferred to Tula Rud Rural District in 2024.
