= Challeh Khuni =

Challeh Khuni چاله خوني
- Village
- Location within Iran
- Coordinates: 37°43′38″N 48°45′15″E
- Country: Iran
- Province: Gilan
- County: Talesh
- Bakhsh: Central
- Rural District: Tula Rud

Population (2006)
  - Total: 158
- Time zone: UTC+3:30 (IRST)
  - Summer (DST): UTC+4:30 (IRDT)

Challeh Khuni (Persian: چاله خوني, also Romanized as Chālleh Khūnī and Chelleh Khūnī) is a village in Tula Rud Rural District, in the Central District of Talesh County, Gilan Province, Iran. At the 2006 census, its population was 158, in 39 families.
