= Lalkeh Poshteh =

Lalkeh Poshteh للكه پشته
- Village
- Location within Iran
- Coordinates: 37°47′15″N 48°57′26″E
- Country: Iran
- Province: Gilan
- County: Talesh
- Bakhsh: Central
- Rural District: Tula Rud

Population (2006)
  - Total: 161
- Time zone: UTC+3:30 (IRST)
  - Summer (DST): UTC+4:30 (IRDT)

Lalkeh Poshteh (Persian: للكه پشته; also known as Lalkeh Posht) is a village in Tula Rud Rural District, in the Central District of Talesh County, Gilan Province, Iran. At the 2006 census, its population was 161, in 37 families.
