= Lowadeh =

Lowadeh لواده
- Village
- Location within Iran
- Coordinates: 37°52′57″N 48°46′18″E
- Country: Iran
- Province: Gilan
- County: Talesh
- Bakhsh: Central
- Rural District: Kuhestani-ye Talesh

Population (2006)
  - Total: 128
- Time zone: UTC+3:30 (IRST)
  - Summer (DST): UTC+4:30 (IRDT)

Lowadeh (Persian: لواده, also Romanized as Lowādeh) is a village in Kuhestani-ye Talesh Rural District, in the Central District of Talesh County, Gilan Province, Iran. At the 2006 census, its population was 128, in 30 families.
