= Sileh Sar =

Sileh Sar سيله سر
- Village
- Location within Iran
- Coordinates: 37°49′52″N 48°45′20″E
- Country: Iran
- Province: Gilan
- County: Talesh
- Bakhsh: Central
- Rural District: Kuhestani-ye Talesh

Population (2006)
  - Total: 157
- Time zone: UTC+3:30 (IRST)
  - Summer (DST): UTC+4:30 (IRDT)

Sileh Sar (Persian: سيله سر, also Romanized as Sīleh Sar and Sīlahsar) is a village in Kuhestani-ye Talesh Rural District, in the Central District of Talesh County, Gilan Province, Iran. At the 2006 census, its population was 157, in 38 families.
