= Maryan, Iran =

Maryan or Meryan (Persian: مريان) in Iran may refer to:

- Maryan, Ardabil
- Maryan, Gilan
- Meryan, alternate name of Aq Owlar, Gilan Province
- Maryan, Razavi Khorasan
