= Dahaneh Siah Darun =

Dahaneh Siah Darun دهنه سياه درون
- Village
- Location within Iran
- Coordinates: 37°47′18″N 48°52′58″E
- Country: Iran
- Province: Gilan
- County: Talesh
- Bakhsh: Central
- Rural District: Tula Rud

Population (2006)
  - Total: 385
- Time zone: UTC+3:30 (IRST)
  - Summer (DST): UTC+4:30 (IRDT)

Dahaneh Siah Darun (Persian: دهنه سياه درون, also Romanized as Dahaneh Sīāh Darūn; also known as Dahaneh Sīādarūd and Dahaneh Sīādarūn) is a village in Tula Rud Rural District, in the Central District of Talesh County, Gilan Province, Iran. At the 2006 census, its population was 385, in 80 families.

== Language ==
Linguistic composition of the village.

Dahaneh Siah Darun linguistic composition
language	percent
Talysh	60%
New Persian	35%
Azerbaijani	5%
