= Qoruq =

Village in Gilan province, Iran

Qoruq Persian: قروق
- Village
- Location within Iran
- Coordinates: 37°49′54″N 48°57′21″E
- Country: Iran
- Province: Gilan
- County: Talesh
- District: Central
- Rural District: Tula Rud

Population (2016)
  - Total: 1,223
- Time zone: UTC+3:30 (IRST)

Qoruq (Persian: قروق) (Note: Also romanized as Qorūq; also known as Bāzār-e Kargārūd and Qoroq) is a village in Tula Rud Rural District of the Central District in Talesh County, Gilan province, Iran.

== Demographics ==
=== Language ===
Linguistic composition of the village.

Qoruq linguistic composition
language	percent
Azerbaijani	80%
Talysh	15%
New Persian	5%

=== Population ===
At the time of the 2006 National Census, the village's population was 1,160 in 274 households, when it was in Saheli-ye Jokandan Rural District. The following census in 2011 counted 1,200 people in 347 households. The 2016 census measured the population of the village as 1,223 people in 368 households.

Qoruq was transferred to Tula Rud Rural District in 2024.
