= Peysara =

Peysara (Persian: پي سرا) may refer to:

- Peysara, Talesh
- Peysara, Kargan Rud, Talesh County
