= Nik Kari =

Nik Kari نيك كري
- Village
- Location within Iran
- Coordinates: 37°46′41″N 48°55′12″E
- Country: Iran
- Province: Gilan
- County: Talesh
- Bakhsh: Central
- Rural District: Tula Rud

Population (2006)
  - Total: 1,434
- Time zone: UTC+3:30 (IRST)
  - Summer (DST): UTC+4:30 (IRDT)

Nik Kari (Persian: نيك كري, also Romanized as Nīk Karī; also known as Nekā Kāy and Nīkāgarī) is a village in Tula Rud Rural District, in the Central District of Talesh County, Gilan Province, Iran. At the 2006 census, its population was 1,434, in 326 families.
