= Masalakuh =

Masalakuh مثلاكوه
- Village
- Location within Iran
- Coordinates: 37°49′44″N 48°49′20″E
- Country: Iran
- Province: Gilan
- County: Talesh
- Bakhsh: Central
- Rural District: Kuhestani-ye Talesh

Population (2006)
  - Total: 113
- Time zone: UTC+3:30 (IRST)
  - Summer (DST): UTC+4:30 (IRDT)

Masalakuh (Persian: مثلاكوه, also Romanized as Mas̄alakūh; also known as Mas̄alankūh) is a village in Kuhestani-ye Talesh Rural District, in the Central District of Talesh County, Gilan Province, Iran. At the 2006 census, its population was 113, in 25 families.
