= Kishavisheh =

Kishavisheh (Persian: اسفيد), also rendered as Keshavosheh or Keshaweshah or Kasha-Veshakh or Kashavasheh, may refer to:

- Kishavisheh-ye Olya
- Kishavisheh-ye Sofla
