= Kulaneh =

Kulaneh كولانه
- Village
- Location within Iran
- Coordinates: 37°50′55″N 48°46′36″E
- Country: Iran
- Province: Gilan
- County: Talesh
- Bakhsh: Central
- Rural District: Kuhestani-ye Talesh

Population (2006)
  - Total: 59
- Time zone: UTC+3:30 (IRST)
  - Summer (DST): UTC+4:30 (IRDT)

Kulaneh (Persian: كولانه, also Romanized as Kūlāneh; also known as Kolūneh) is a village in Kuhestani-ye Talesh Rural District, in the Central District of Talesh County, Gilan Province, Iran. At the 2006 census, its population was 59, in 15 families.
