= Khaseh Sara =

Village in Gilan province, Iran

Khaseh Sara Persian: خاصه سرا
- Village
- Location within Iran
- Coordinates: 37°50′30″N 48°55′00″E
- Country: Iran
- Province: Gilan
- County: Talesh
- District: Jokandan
- Rural District: Saheli-ye Jokandan

Population (2016)
  - Total: 307
- Time zone: UTC+3:30 (IRST)

Khaseh Sara (Persian: خاصه سرا) (Note: Also romanized as Khāşeh Sarā) is a village in Saheli-ye Jokandan Rural District of Jokandan District in Talesh County, Gilan province, Iran.

== Demographics ==
=== Language ===
Linguistic composition of the village.

Khaseh Sara linguistic composition
language	percent
Talysh	60%
Azerbaijani	25%
New Persian	15%

=== Population ===
At the time of the 2006 National Census, the village's population was 246 in 54 households, when it was in the Central District. The following census in 2011 counted 293 people in 83 households. The 2016 census measured the population of the village as 307 people in 96 households.

In 2024, the rural district was separated from the district in the formation of Jokandan District.
