= Nema Huni =

Nema Huni نماهوني
- Village
- Location within Iran
- Coordinates: 37°53′21″N 48°38′23″E
- Country: Iran
- Province: Gilan
- County: Talesh
- Bakhsh: Central
- Rural District: Kuhestani-ye Talesh

Population (2006)
  - Total: 18
- Time zone: UTC+3:30 (IRST)
  - Summer (DST): UTC+4:30 (IRDT)

Nema Huni (Persian: نماهوني, also Romanized as Nemā Hūnī) is a village in Kuhestani-ye Talesh Rural District, in the Central District of Talesh County, Gilan Province, Iran. At the 2006 census, its population was 18, in 5 families.

== Language ==
Linguistic composition of the village.

Nema Huni linguistic composition
language	percent
Azerbaijani	100%
