= Peysara, Talesh =

Village in Gilan province, Iran

Peysara Persian: پي سرا
- Village
- Location within Iran
- Coordinates: 37°54′03″N 48°53′05″E
- Country: Iran
- Province: Gilan
- County: Talesh
- District: Jokandan
- Rural District: Nilrud

Population (2016)
  - Total: 881
- Time zone: UTC+3:30 (IRST)

Peysara (Persian: پي سرا) (Note: Also romanized as Peysarā; also known as Pasareh and Pasarekh) is a village in Nilrud Rural District of Jokandan District in Talesh County, Gilan province, Iran.

== Demographics ==
=== Language ===
Linguistic composition of the village.

Peysara linguistic composition
language	percent
Azerbaijani	80%
Talysh	15%
New Persian	5%

=== Population ===
At the time of the 2006 National Census, the village's population was 931 in 196 households, when it was in Saheli-ye Jokandan Rural District of the Central District. The following census in 2011 counted 883 people in 233 households. The 2016 census measured the population of the village as 881 people in 232 households.

In 2024, the rural district was separated from the district in the formation of Jokandan District, and Peysara was transferred to Nilrud Rural District created in the new district.
