= Hayan =

Hayan حيان
- Village
- Location within Iran
- Coordinates: 37°48′41″N 48°56′25″E
- Country: Iran
- Province: Gilan
- County: Talesh
- Bakhsh: Central
- Rural District: Tula Rud

Population (2006)
  - Total: 486
- Time zone: UTC+3:30 (IRST)
  - Summer (DST): UTC+4:30 (IRDT)

Hayan (Persian: حيان, also Romanized as Ḩayān) is a village in Tula Rud Rural District, in the Central District of Talesh County, Gilan Province, Iran. At the 2006 census, its population was 486, in 107 families.
