= Saragah =

Village in Gilan province, Iran

Saragah Persian: سراگاه
- Village
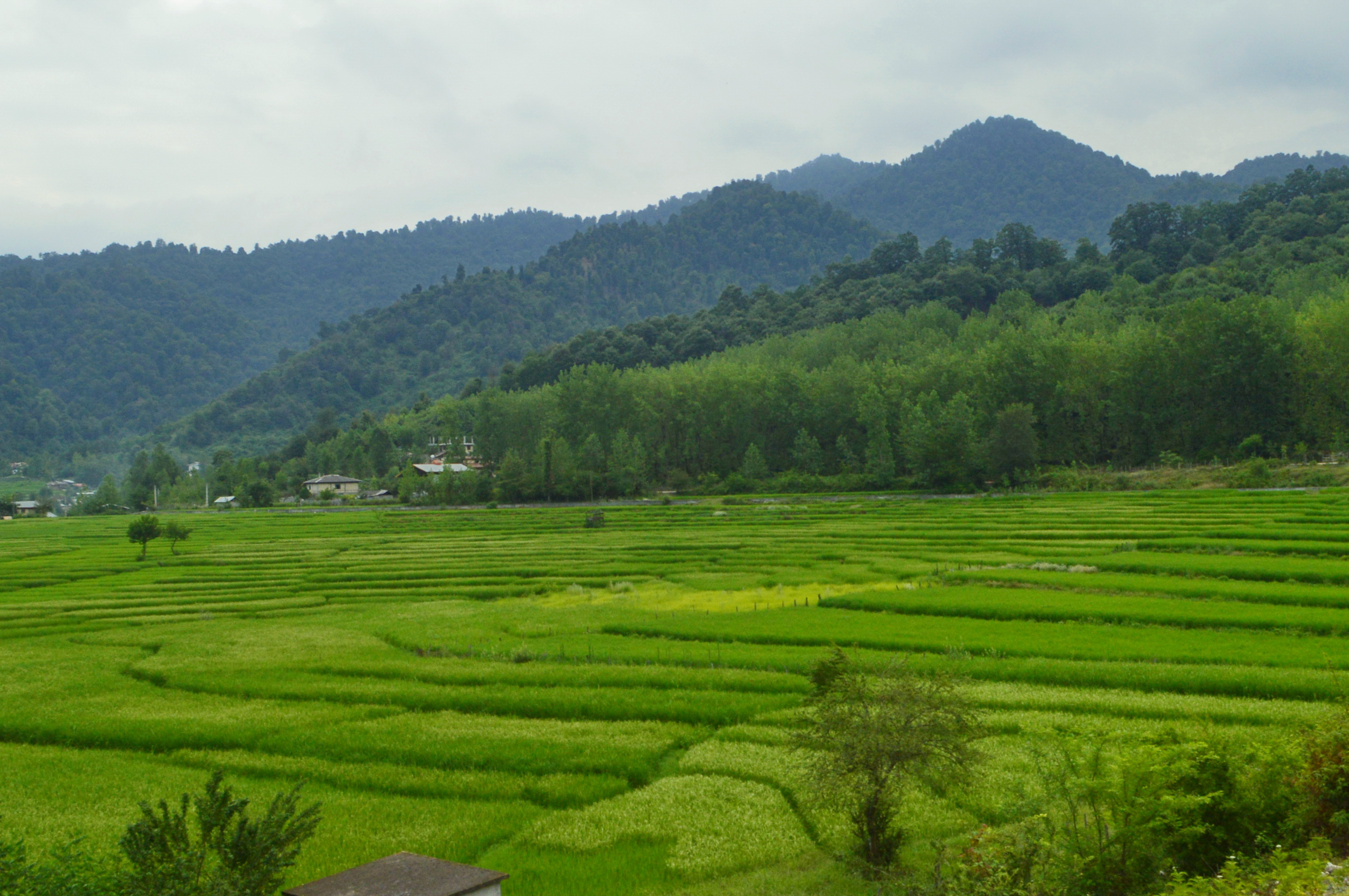
- Landscape near the village of Saragah

- Location within Iran
- Coordinates: 37°49′07″N 48°52′33″E
- Country: Iran
- Province: Gilan
- County: Talesh
- District: Central
- Rural District: Tula Rud

Population (2016)
  - Total: 889
- Time zone: UTC+3:30 (IRST)

Saragah (Persian: سراگاه) (Note: Also romanized as Sarāgāh) is a village in Tula Rud Rural District of the Central District in Talesh County, Gilan province, Iran.

== Demographics ==
=== Language ===
Linguistic composition of the village.

Saragah linguistic composition
language	percent
Talysh	80%
Azerbaijani	15%
New Persian	5%

=== Population ===
At the time of the 2006 National Census, the village's population was 847 in 193 households, when it was in Saheli-ye Jokandan Rural District. The following census in 2011 counted 811 people in 220 households. The 2016 census measured the population of the village as 889 people in 257 households.

Qoruq was transferred to Tula Rud Rural District in 2024.
