= Siaposht =

Siaposht سياپشت
- Village
- Location within Iran
- Coordinates: 37°53′21″N 48°45′56″E
- Country: Iran
- Province: Gilan
- County: Talesh
- Bakhsh: Central
- Rural District: Kuhestani-ye Talesh

Population (2006)
  - Total: 58
- Time zone: UTC+3:30 (IRST)
  - Summer (DST): UTC+4:30 (IRDT)

Siaposht (Persian: سياپشت, also Romanized as Sīāposht; also known as Sīāh Posht) is a village in Kuhestani-ye Talesh Rural District, in the Central District of Talesh County, Gilan Province, Iran. At the 2006 census, its population was 58, in 12 families.
