= Tangdeh Tul Gilan =

Village in Gilan province, Iran

Tangdeh Tul Gilan Persian: تنگده طول گيلان
- Village
- Location within Iran
- Coordinates: 37°50′39″N 48°53′51″E
- Country: Iran
- Province: Gilan
- County: Talesh
- District: Jokandan
- Rural District: Saheli-ye Jokandan

Population (2016)
  - Total: 1,860
- Time zone: UTC+3:30 (IRST)

Tangdeh Tul Gilan (Persian: تنگده طول گيلان) (Note: Also romanized as Tangdeh Ţūl Gīlān) is a village in Saheli-ye Jokandan Rural District of Jokandan District in Talesh County, Gilan province, Iran.

== Demographics ==
=== Language ===
Linguistic composition of the village.

Tangdeh Tul Gilan linguistic composition
language	percent
Talysh	45%
Azerbaijani	30%
New Persian	25%

=== Population ===
At the time of the 2006 National Census, the village's population was 1,513 in 358 households, when it was in the Central District. The following census in 2011 counted 1,658 people in 442 households. The 2016 census measured the population of the village as 1,860 people in 514 households.

In 2024, the rural district was separated from the district in the formation of Jokandan District.
