= Zarbil =

Zarbil (Persian: زربيل) may refer to:

- Zarbil, East Azerbaijan
- Zarbil, Gilan
