= Barzagaru =

Barzagaru برزگرو
- Village
- Location within Iran
- Coordinates: 37°46′24″N 48°58′26″E
- Country: Iran
- Province: Gilan
- County: Talesh
- Bakhsh: Central
- Rural District: Tula Rud

Population (2006)
  - Total: 298
- Time zone: UTC+3:30 (IRST)
  - Summer (DST): UTC+4:30 (IRDT)

Barzagaru (Persian: برزگرو, also Romanized as Barzagarū and Barzegarū) is a village in Tula Rud Rural District, in the Central District of Talesh County, Gilan Province, Iran. At the 2006 census, its population was 298, in 68 families.
