= Seleh Yurdi =

Seleh Yurdi سله يوردي
- Village
- Location within Iran
- Coordinates: 37°49′04″N 48°36′22″E
- Country: Iran
- Province: Gilan
- County: Talesh
- Bakhsh: Central
- Rural District: Kuhestani-ye Talesh

Population (2006)
  - Total: 42
- Time zone: UTC+3:30 (IRST)
  - Summer (DST): UTC+4:30 (IRDT)

Seleh Yurdi (Persian: سله يوردي, also Romanized as Seleh Yūrdī; also known as Sel Yūrdī) is a village in Kuhestani-ye Talesh Rural District, in the Central District of Talesh County, Gilan Province, Iran. At the 2006 census, its population was 42, in 12 families.
