= Nasur Mahalleh =

Village in Gilan province, Iran

Nasur Mahalleh Persian: نصورمحله
- Village
- Location within Iran
- Coordinates: 37°51′55″N 48°54′25″E
- Country: Iran
- Province: Gilan
- County: Talesh
- District: Jokandan
- Rural District: Saheli-ye Jokandan

Population (2016)
  - Total: 528
- Time zone: UTC+3:30 (IRST)

Nasur Mahalleh (Persian: نصورمحله) (Note: Also romanized as Naşūr Maḩalleh and Naşūrmaḩalleh) is a village in Saheli-ye Jokandan Rural District of Jokandan District in Talesh County, Gilan province, Iran.

== Demographics ==
=== Language ===
Linguistic composition of the village.

Nasur Mahalleh linguistic composition
language	percent
Talysh	80%
Azerbaijani	15%
New Persian	5%

=== Population ===
At the time of the 2006 National Census, the village's population was 368 in 80 households, when it was in the Central District. The following census in 2011 counted 429 people in 114 households. The 2016 census measured the population of the village as 528 people in 112 households.

In 2024, the rural district was separated from the district in the formation of Jokandan District.
