= Postan Sar =

Postan Sar پستان سر
- Village
- Country: Iran
- Province: Gilan
- County: Talesh
- Bakhsh: Central
- Rural District: Tula Rud

Population (2006)
  - Total: 64
- Time zone: UTC+3:30 (IRST)
  - Summer (DST): UTC+4:30 (IRDT)

Postan Sar (Persian: پستان سر, also Romanized as Postān Sar) is a village in Tula Rud Rural District, in the Central District of Talesh County, Gilan Province, Iran. At the 2006 census, its population was 64, in 12 families.
