= Jow Kandan-e Bozorg =

Village in Gilan province, Iran

Jow Kandan-e Bozorg Persian: جوكندان بزرگ
- Village
- Location within Iran
- Coordinates: 37°53′27″N 48°54′15″E
- Country: Iran
- Province: Gilan
- County: Talesh
- District: Jokandan
- Rural District: Nilrud

Population (2016)
  - Total: 990
- Time zone: UTC+3:30 (IRST)

Jow Kandan-e Bozorg (Persian: جوكندان بزرگ) (Note: Also romanized as Jow Kandān-e Bozorg; also known as Jow Kandān and Jūkandān) is a village in, and the capital of, Nilrud Rural District in Jokandan District of Talesh County, Gilan province, Iran.

== Demographics ==
=== Language ===
Linguistic composition of the village.

Jow Kandan-e Bozorg linguistic composition
language	percent
Talysh	75%
New Persian	20%
Azerbaijani	5%

=== Population ===
At the time of the 2006 National Census, the village's population was 801 in 186 households, when it was in Saheli-ye Jokandan Rural District of the Central District. The following census in 2011 counted 920 people in 274 households. The 2016 census measured the population of the village as 990 people in 281 households.

In 2024, the rural district was separated from the district in the formation of Jokandan District, and Jow Kandan-e Bozorg was transferred to Nilrud Rural District created in the new district.
