= Nalband, Gilan =

Village in Gilan province, Iran

Nalband Persian: نعلبند
- Village
- Location within Iran
- Coordinates: 37°48′09″N 48°52′35″E
- Country: Iran
- Province: Gilan
- County: Talesh
- District: Central
- Rural District: Tula Rud

Population (2016)
  - Total: 549
- Time zone: UTC+3:30 (IRST)

Nalband (Persian: نعلبند) (Note: Also romanized as Na'lband) is a village in Tula Rud Rural District of the Central District in Talesh County, Gilan province, Iran.

== Demographics ==
=== Language ===
Linguistic composition of the village.

Nalband linguistic composition
language	percent
Talysh	80%
Azerbaijani	15%
New Persian	5%

=== Population ===
At the time of the 2006 National Census, the village's population was 458 in 102 households, when it was in Saheli-ye Jokandan Rural District. The following census in 2011 counted 509 people in 146 households. The 2016 census measured the population of the village as 549 people in 163 households.

Qoruq was transferred to Tula Rud Rural District in 2024.
