= Tula Rud-e Pain =

Tula Rud-e Pain طولا رود پائين
- Village, Suburb
- Location within Iran
- Coordinates: 37°47′34″N 48°57′59″E
- Country: Iran
- Province: Gilan
- County: Talesh
- Bakhsh: Central
- Rural District: Tula Rud

Population (2011)
  - Total: 679
- Time zone: UTC+3:30 (IRST)

Tula Rud-e Pain (Persian: طولا رود پائين, also Romanized as Ţūlā Rūd-e Pā’īn; also known as Tulari and Ţūlā Rūd) is a village in Tula Rud Rural District, in the Central District of Talesh County, Gilan Province, Iran. It is a southern suburb of the city of Tālesh, being the southernmost neghiborhood of the city.

At the 2006 census, its population was 413, in 82 families. The 2011 census measured a population of 679, in 184 households.. The 2016 census measured no household population as the residential area was annexed into Talesh city's urban area.

== Language ==
It is a predominately Talysh speaking and mostly Shia town.

== Notable residents ==
Ahmad Parvai'i Rik, Shia Cleric & Politician
