= Shilan, Gilan =

Village in Gilan province, Iran

Shilan Persian: شيلان
- Village
- Location within Iran
- Coordinates: 37°51′10″N 48°54′48″E
- Country: Iran
- Province: Gilan
- County: Talesh
- District: Jokandan
- Rural District: Saheli-ye Jokandan

Population (2016)
  - Total: 203
- Time zone: UTC+3:30 (IRST)

Shilan (Persian: شيلان) (Note: Also romanized as Shīlān; also known as Shīlā Ben Bālā, Shīlā Ben Pā’īn, and Shilo) is a village in Saheli-ye Jokandan Rural District of Jokandan District in Talesh County, Gilan province, Iran.

== Demographics ==
=== Language ===
Linguistic composition of the village.

Shilan linguistic composition
language	percent
Azerbaijani	80%
Talysh	15%
New Persian	5%

=== Population ===
At the time of the 2006 National Census, the village's population was 198 in 45 households, when it was in the Central District. The following census in 2011 counted 196 people in 48 households. The 2016 census measured the population of the village as 203 people in 61 households.

In 2024, the rural district was separated from the district in the formation of Jokandan District.
