= Makash =

Makash مكش
- Village
- Location within Iran
- Coordinates: 37°52′21″N 48°39′39″E
- Country: Iran
- Province: Gilan
- County: Talesh
- Bakhsh: Central
- Rural District: Kuhestani-ye Talesh

Population (2006)
  - Total: 102
- Time zone: UTC+3:30 (IRST)
  - Summer (DST): UTC+4:30 (IRDT)

Makash (Persian: مكش) is a village in Kuhestani-ye Talesh Rural District, in the Central District of Talesh County, Gilan Province, Iran. At the 2006 census, its population was 102, in 23 families.

== Language ==
Linguistic composition of the village.

Makash linguistic composition
language	percent
Azerbaijani	100%
