= Jamakuh =

Village in Gilan province, Iran

Jamakuh Persian: جماكوه
- Village
- Location within Iran
- Coordinates: 37°49′38″N 48°56′05″E
- Country: Iran
- Province: Gilan
- County: Talesh
- District: Jokandan
- Rural District: Saheli-ye Jokandan

Population (2016)
  - Total: 713
- Time zone: UTC+3:30 (IRST)

Jamakuh (Persian: جماكوه) (Note: Also romanized as Jamākūh) is a village in Saheli-ye Jokandan Rural District of Jokandan District in Talesh County, Gilan province, Iran.

== Demographics ==
=== Population ===
At the time of the 2006 National Census, the village's population was 623 in 151 households, when it was in the Central District. The following census in 2011 counted 659 people in 195 households. The 2016 census measured the population of the village as 713 people in 222 households.

In 2024, the rural district was separated from the district in the formation of Jokandan District.
