= Asbu Sara =

Asbu Sara اسبوسرا
- Village
- Country: Iran
- Province: Gilan
- County: Talesh
- Bakhsh: Central
- Rural District: Kuhestani-ye Talesh

Population (2006)
  - Total: 128
- Time zone: UTC+3:30 (IRST)
  - Summer (DST): UTC+4:30 (IRDT)

Asbu Sara (Persian: اسبوسرا, also Romanized as Āsbū Sarā) is a village in Kuhestani-ye Talesh Rural District, in the Central District of Talesh County, Gilan Province, Iran. At the 2006 census, its population was 128, in 29 families.
