= Hareh Shun Dasht =

Hareh Shun Dasht هره شوندشت
- Village
- Location within Iran
- Coordinates: 37°42′31″N 48°43′07″E
- Country: Iran
- Province: Gilan
- County: Talesh
- Bakhsh: Central
- Rural District: Tula Rud

Population (2006)
  - Total: 34
- Time zone: UTC+3:30 (IRST)
  - Summer (DST): UTC+4:30 (IRDT)

Hareh Shun Dasht (Persian: هره شوندشت, also Romanized as Hareh Shūn Dasht; also known as Harshūn Dasht) is a village in Tula Rud Rural District, in the Central District of Talesh County, Gilan Province, Iran. At the 2006 census, its population was 34, in 5 families.
