= Si Na Huni =

Si Na Huni سيناهوني
- Village
- Location within Iran
- Coordinates: 37°49′36″N 48°43′29″E
- Country: Iran
- Province: Gilan
- County: Talesh
- Bakhsh: Central
- Rural District: Kuhestani-ye Talesh

Population (2006)
  - Total: 101
- Time zone: UTC+3:30 (IRST)
  - Summer (DST): UTC+4:30 (IRDT)

Si Na Huni (Persian: سيناهوني, also Romanized as Sī Nā Hūnī; also known as Sī Nah Hūnī) is a village in Kuhestani-ye Talesh Rural District, in the Central District of Talesh County, Gilan Province, Iran. At the 2006 census, its population was 101, in 25 families.

== Language ==
Linguistic composition of the village.

Si Na Huni linguistic composition
language	percent
Azerbaijani	70%
Talysh	30%
