= Lanbeh =

Lanbeh لنبه
- Village
- Country: Iran
- Province: Gilan
- County: Talesh
- Bakhsh: Central
- Rural District: Kuhestani-ye Talesh

Population (2006)
  - Total: 89
- Time zone: UTC+3:30 (IRST)
  - Summer (DST): UTC+4:30 (IRDT)

Lanbeh (Persian: لنبه) is a village in Kuhestani-ye Talesh Rural District, in the Central District of Talesh County, Gilan Province, Iran. At the 2006 census, its population was 89, in 21 families.
