= Chelownah Sar =

Village in Gilan province, Iran

Chelownah Sar Persian: چلونه سر
- Village
- Location within Iran
- Coordinates: 37°52′19″N 48°53′55″E
- Country: Iran
- Province: Gilan
- County: Talesh
- District: Jokandan
- Rural District: Saheli-ye Jokandan

Population (2016)
  - Total: 1,198
- Time zone: UTC+3:30 (IRST)

Chelownah Sar (Persian: چلونه سر) (Note: Also romanized as Chelownaşar; also known as Chalakasar, Chalānā Sār, Chalāneh Sar, Chalmeh Sarā, Chateh Naz̧ar, Chelneh Sar, and Chelow Sar) is a village in, and the capital of, Saheli-ye Jokandan Rural District in Jokandan District of Talesh County, in Iran's Gilan province.

== Demographics ==
=== Language ===
Linguistic composition of the village.

Chelownah Sar linguistic composition
language	percent
Talysh	60%
Azerbaijani	35%
New Persian	5%

=== Population ===
At the time of the 2006 National Census, the village's population was 1,294 in 285 households, when it was in the Central District. The following census in 2011 counted 1,400 people in 362 households. The 2016 census measured the population of the village as 1,198 people in 352 households.

In 2024, the rural district was separated from the district in the formation of Jokandan District.
