= Shah Rasul =

Shah Rasul شاه رسول
- Village
- Location within Iran
- Coordinates: 37°42′12″N 48°41′41″E
- Country: Iran
- Province: Gilan
- County: Talesh
- Bakhsh: Central
- Rural District: Tula Rud

Population (2006)
  - Total: 58
- Time zone: UTC+3:30 (IRST)
  - Summer (DST): UTC+4:30 (IRDT)

Shah Rasul (Persian: شاه رسول, also Romanized as Shāh Rasūl; also known as Shāh Rasūl-e Pā’īn) is a village in Tula Rud Rural District, in the Central District of Talesh County, Gilan Province, Iran. At the 2006 census, its population was 58, in 13 families.
