= Qaleh Chal =

Qaleh Chal قلعه چال
- Village
- Location within Iran
- Coordinates: 37°45′36″N 48°41′34″E
- Country: Iran
- Province: Gilan
- County: Talesh
- Bakhsh: Central
- Rural District: Kuhestani-ye Talesh

Population (2006)
  - Total: 86
- Time zone: UTC+3:30 (IRST)
  - Summer (DST): UTC+4:30 (IRDT)

Qaleh Chal (Persian: قلعه چال, also Romanized as Qal‘eh Chāl and Qal‘ehchāl) is a village in Kuhestani-ye Talesh Rural District, in the Central District of Talesh County, Gilan Province, Iran. At the 2006 census, its population was 86, in 19 families.
