= Bilyabin =

Village in Gilan province, Iran

Bilyabin Persian: بيليابين
- Village
- Location within Iran
- Coordinates: 37°52′09″N 48°42′00″E
- Country: Iran
- Province: Gilan
- County: Talesh
- District: Central
- Rural District: Kuhestani-ye Talesh

Population (2016)
  - Total: 278
- Time zone: UTC+3:30 (IRST)

Bilyabin (Persian: بيليابين) (Note: Also romanized as Bīlyābīn) is a village in Kuhestani-ye Talesh Rural District of the Central District in Talesh County, Gilan province, Iran.

== Demographics ==
=== Population ===
According to the 2006 National Census, the village had a population of 236 in 55 households. The 2011 census recorded 262 people in 67 households. The 2016 census reported 278 people in 84 households .
