= Dul Beyn =

Village in Gilan province, Iran

Dul Beyn Persian: دولبين
- Village
- Location within Iran
- Coordinates: 37°49′42″N 48°54′52″E
- Country: Iran
- Province: Gilan
- County: Talesh
- District: Jokandan
- Rural District: Saheli-ye Jokandan

Population (2016)
  - Total: 488
- Time zone: UTC+3:30 (IRST)

Dul Beyn (Persian: دولبين) (Note: Also romanized as Dūl Beyn; also known as Dūlbīn-e Bālā and Dūlīn) is a village in Saheli-ye Jokandan Rural District of Jokandan District in Talesh County, Gilan province, Iran.

== Demographics ==
=== Language ===
The linguistic composition of the village is as follows:

Dul Beyn linguistic composition
Language	Speakers (%)
Talysh	45%
Azerbaijani	30%
New Persian	25%

=== Population ===
At the time of the 2006 National Census, the village's population was 378 in 94 households, when it was in the Central District. The following census in 2011 counted 420 people in 116 households. The 2016 census measured the population of the village as 488 people in 147 households.

In 2024, the rural district was separated from the district in the formation of Jokandan District.
