= Dulin =

Dulin may refer to:

- Ashton Dulin (born 1997), American football player
- Brice Dulin (born 1990), French rugby union player
- Pierre Dulin or Pierre d’Ulin (1669–1748), 17th century French painter
- Dul Beyn, a city in Iran
