= Shileh Vasht =

Village in Gilan province, Iran

Shileh Vasht Persian: شيله وشت
- Village
- Location within Iran
- Coordinates: 37°49′30″N 48°42′32″E
- Country: Iran
- Province: Gilan
- County: Talesh
- District: Central
- Rural District: Kuhestani-ye Talesh

Population (2016)
  - Total: 551
- Time zone: UTC+3:30 (IRST)

Shileh Vasht (Persian: شيله وشت) (Note: Also romanized as Shīleh Vasht; also known as Shīleh Vasht-e Soflá) is a village in Kuhestani-ye Talesh Rural District of the Central District in Talesh County, Gilan province, Iran.

== Demographics ==
=== Population ===
At the time of the 2006 National Census, the village's population was 364 in 81 households. The following census in 2011 counted 443 people in 112 households. The 2016 census measured the population of the village as 551 people in 160 households.
