= Tazehabad, Talesh =

Village in Gilan province, Iran

Tazehabad Persian: تازه اباد
- Village
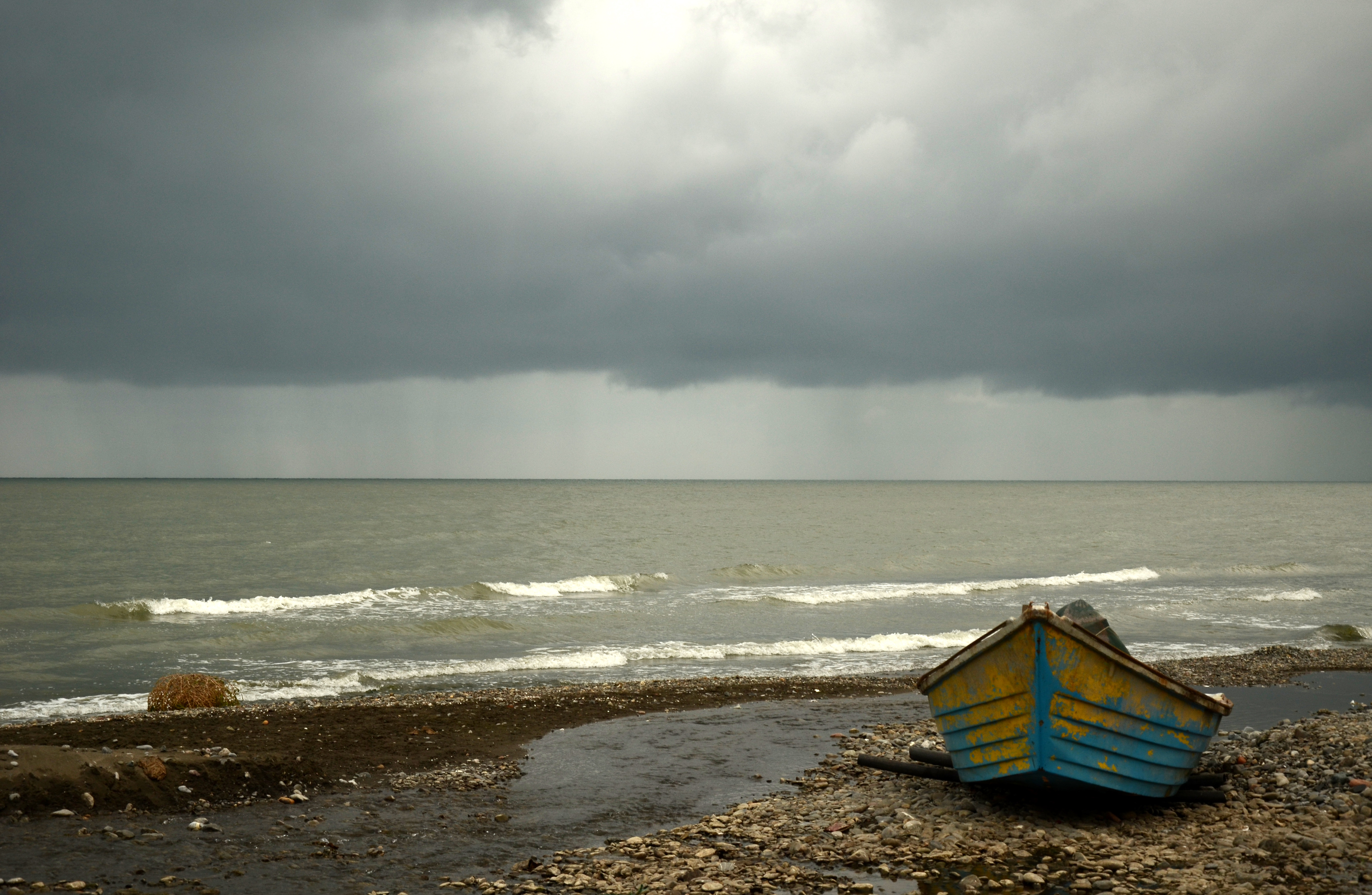
- View of the Caspian Sea from the village of Tazehabad

- Location within Iran
- Coordinates: 37°47′59″N 48°58′19″E
- Country: Iran
- Province: Gilan
- County: Talesh
- District: Central
- Rural District: Tula Rud

Population (2016)
  - Total: 1,069
- Time zone: UTC+3:30 (IRST)

Tazehabad (Persian: تازه اباد) (Note: Also romanized as Tāzehābād; also known as Tazekhabad) is a village in Tula Rud Rural District of the Central District in Talesh County, Gilan province, Iran.

== Demographics ==
=== Population ===
At the time of the 2006 National Census, the village's population was 1,002 in 224 households. The following census in 2011 counted 1,325 people in 349 households. The 2016 census measured the population of the village as 1,069 people in 319 households.
