= Lor, Gilan =

Village in Gilan province, Iran

Lor Persian: لر
- Village
- Location within Iran
- Coordinates: 37°43′37″N 48°41′53″E
- Country: Iran
- Province: Gilan
- County: Talesh
- District: Central
- Rural District: Kuhestani-ye Talesh

Population (2016)
  - Total: 237
- Time zone: UTC+3:30 (IRST)

Lor (Persian: لر) is a village in Kuhestani-ye Talesh Rural District of the Central District in Talesh County, Gilan province, Iran.

== Demographics ==
=== Population ===
At the time of the 2006 National Census, the village's population was 97 in 22 households. The following census in 2011 counted 106 people in 38 households. The 2016 census measured the population of the village as 237 people in 76 households.
