= Owleh Kari-ye Tula Rud =

Village in Gilan province, Iran

Owleh Kari-ye Tula Rud Persian: اوله كري طولارود
- Village
- Country: Iran
- Province: Gilan
- County: Talesh
- District: Central
- Rural District: Tula Rud

Population (2016)
  - Total: 818
- Time zone: UTC+3:30 (IRST)

Owleh Kari-ye Tula Rud (Persian: اوله كري طولارود) (Note: Also romanized as Owleh Karī-ye Ţūlā Rūd) is a village in Tula Rud Rural District of the Central District in Talesh County, Gilan province, Iran.

== Demographics ==
=== Population ===
At the time of the 2006 National Census, the village's population was 822 in 168 households. The following census in 2011 counted 919 people in 225 households. The 2016 census measured the population of the village as 818 people in 231 households.
