= Derazlu =

Village in Gilan province, Iran

Derazlu Persian: درازلو
- Village
- Location within Iran
- Coordinates: 37°46′07″N 48°57′21″E
- Country: Iran
- Province: Gilan
- County: Talesh
- District: Central
- Rural District: Tula Rud

Population (2016)
  - Total: 505
- Time zone: UTC+3:30 (IRST)

Derazlu (Persian: درازلو) (Note: Also romanized as Derāzlū and Darazalū; also known as Dahrehzalū and Derezelu) is a village in Tula Rud Rural District of the Central District in Talesh County, Gilan province, Iran.

== Demographics ==
=== Population ===
At the time of the 2006 National Census, the village's population was 394 in 78 households. The following census in 2011 counted 447 people in 117 households. The 2016 census measured the population of the village as 505 people in 140 households.
