= Anbara Posht =

Village in Gilan province, Iran

Anbara Posht Persian: عنبراپشت
- Village
- Location within Iran
- Coordinates: 37°46′51″N 48°56′29″E
- Country: Iran
- Province: Gilan
- County: Talesh
- District: Central
- Rural District: Tula Rud

Population (2016)
  - Total: 858
- Time zone: UTC+3:30 (IRST)

Anbara Posht (Persian: عنبراپشت) (Note: Also romanized as ‘Anbarā Pesht and ‘Anbarā Posht; also known as ‘Anbar Posht) is a village in Tula Rud Rural District of the Central District in Talesh County, Gilan province, Iran.

== Demographics ==
=== Population ===
At the time of the 2006 National Census, the village's population was 786 in 178 households. The following census in 2011 counted 849 people in 247 households. The 2016 census measured the population of the village as 858 people in 268 households.
