= Kasemjan =

Village in Gilan province, Iran

Kasemjan Persian: كسم جان
- Village
- Location within Iran
- Coordinates: 37°50′12″N 48°44′08″E
- Country: Iran
- Province: Gilan
- County: Talesh
- District: Central
- Rural District: Kuhestani-ye Talesh

Population (2016)
  - Total: 450
- Time zone: UTC+3:30 (IRST)

Kasemjan (Persian: كسم جان) (Note: Also romanized as Kasemjān; also known as Gasamjān, Kasbehjān-e Pā’īn, and Kasmehjān) is a village in Kuhestani-ye Talesh Rural District of the Central District in Talesh County, Gilan province, Iran.

== Demographics ==
=== Population ===
At the time of the 2006 National Census, the village's population was 352 in 88 households. The following census in 2011 counted 360 people in 106 households. The 2016 census measured the population of the village as 450 people in 147 households.
