= Vazneh Sar =

Vazneh Sar (Persian: وزنه سر) may refer to:

- Vazneh Sar, Gilan
- Vazneh Sar, Zanjan
