= Kashtami =

Village in Gilan province, Iran

Kashtami Persian: كشتمي
- Village
- Location within Iran
- Coordinates: 37°49′41″N 48°48′17″E
- Country: Iran
- Province: Gilan
- County: Talesh
- District: Central
- Rural District: Kuhestani-ye Talesh

Population (2016)
  - Total: 603
- Time zone: UTC+3:30 (IRST)

Kashtami (Persian: كشتمي) (Note: Also romanized as Kashtamī; also known as Kish Dibi (کیش دیبی), also romanized as Kīsh Dībī) is a village in, and the capital of, Kuhestani-ye Talesh Rural District in the Central District of Talesh County, Gilan province, Iran.

== Demographics ==
=== Population ===
At the time of the 2006 National Census, the village's population was 502 in 110 households. The following census in 2011 counted 482 people in 135 households. The 2016 census measured the population of the village as 603 people in 186 households. It was the most populous village in its rural district.
