= Poshteh, Talesh =

Village in Gilan province, Iran

Poshteh Persian: پشته
- Village
- Location within Iran
- Coordinates: 37°51′27″N 48°56′42″E
- Country: Iran
- Province: Gilan
- County: Talesh
- District: Jokandan
- Rural District: Saheli-ye Jokandan

Population (2016)
  - Total: 1,226
- Time zone: UTC+3:30 (IRST)

Poshteh (Persian: پشته) is a village in Saheli-ye Jokandan Rural District of Jokandan District in Talesh County, Gilan province, Iran.

== Demographics ==
=== Language ===
Linguistic composition of the village.

Poshteh linguistic composition
language	percent
Azerbaijani	65%
Talysh	20%
New Persian	15%

=== Population ===
At the time of the 2006 National Census, the village's population was 1,149 in 259 households, when it was in the Central District. The following census in 2011 counted 1,201 people in 316 households. The 2016 census measured the population of the village as 1,226 people in 365 households.

In 2024, the rural district was separated from the district in the formation of Jokandan District.
