= Razeh =

Razeh or Razzeh or Rezeh (Persian: رزه) may refer to:

- Razeh, Gilan
- Razeh, South Khorasan
