= Suraposht =

Village in Gilan province, Iran

Suraposht Persian: سوراپشت
- Village
- Location within Iran
- Coordinates: 37°47′59″N 48°55′50″E
- Country: Iran
- Province: Gilan
- County: Talesh
- District: Central
- Rural District: Tula Rud

Population (2016)
  - Total: 1,535
- Time zone: UTC+3:30 (IRST)

Suraposht (Persian: سوراپشت) (Note: Also romanized as Sūrā Pesht and Sūrāposht; also known as Sor Poshteh, Sūreh Posht, Sūreh Poshteh, and Surekh-Pushtekh) is a village in Tula Rud Rural District of the Central District in Talesh County, Gilan province, Iran.

== Demographics ==
=== Population ===
At the time of the 2006 National Census, the village's population was 899 in 222 households. The following census in 2011 counted 1,142 people in 329 households. The 2016 census measured the population of the village as 1,535 people in 462 households.
