= Takiabad, Gilan =

Village in Gilan province, Iran

Takiabad Persian: تكي اباد
- Village
- Location within Iran
- Coordinates: 37°47′14″N 48°58′28″E
- Country: Iran
- Province: Gilan
- County: Talesh
- District: Central
- Rural District: Tula Rud

Population (2016)
  - Total: 580
- Time zone: UTC+3:30 (IRST)

Takiabad (Persian: تکی‌آباد) (Note: Also romanized as Takīābād; also known as Takī) is a village in Tula Rud Rural District of the Central District in Talesh County, Gilan province, Iran.

== Demographics ==
=== Population ===
At the time of the 2006 National Census, the village's population was 875 in 197 households. The following census in 2011 counted 569 people in 159 households. The 2016 census measured the population of the village as 580 people in 177 households.
