= Navan, Gilan =

Navan ناوان
- Village
- Location within Iran
- Coordinates: 37°51′27″N 48°39′38″E
- Country: Iran
- Province: Gilan
- County: Talesh
- Bakhsh: Central
- Rural District: Kuhestani-ye Talesh

Population (2006)
  - Total: 111
- Time zone: UTC+3:30 (IRST)
  - Summer (DST): UTC+4:30 (IRDT)

Navan (Persian: ناوان, also Romanized as Nāvān; also known as Nou) is a village in Kuhestani-ye Talesh Rural District, in the Central District of Talesh County, Gilan Province, Iran. At the 2006 census, its population was 111, in 26 families.

== Language ==
Linguistic composition of the village.

Navan linguistic composition
language	percent
Azerbaijani	100%
