= Rik, Iran =

Village in Gilan province, Iran

Rik Persian: ریک
- Village
- Location within Iran
- Coordinates: 37°47′30″N 48°52′20″E
- Country: Iran
- Province: Gilan
- County: Talesh
- District: Central
- Rural District: Tula Rud

Population (2016)
  - Total: 1,509
- Time zone: UTC+3:30 (IRST)

Rik (Persian: ریک) (Note: Also romanized as Rīk; also known as Reg, Rek, and Rīg) is a village in Tula Rud Rural District of the Central District in Talesh County, Gilan province, Iran. It was the traditional residence of the Khans of Karganrud.

== Demographics ==
=== Population ===
At the time of the 2006 National Census, the village's population was 1,565 in 336 households. The following census in 2011 counted 1,540 people in 417 households. The 2016 census measured the population of the village as 1,509 people in 442 households.
