= Khalifeh Gari =

Village in Gilan province, Iran

Khalifeh Gari Persian: خليفه گري
- Village
- Location within Iran
- Coordinates: 37°49′15″N 48°57′11″E
- Country: Iran
- Province: Gilan
- County: Talesh
- District: Central
- Rural District: Tula Rud

Population (2016)
  - Total: 575
- Time zone: UTC+3:30 (IRST)

Khalifeh Gari (Persian: خليفه گري) (Note: Also romanized as Khalīfeh Garī; also known as Khalfehgarī and Khalīfeh Karī) is a village in Tula Rud Rural District of the Central District in Talesh County, Gilan province, Iran.

== Demographics ==
=== Population ===
At the time of the 2006 National Census, the village's population was 493 in 113 households. The following census in 2011 counted 495 people in 124 households. The 2016 census measured the population of the village as 575 people in 165 households.
