= Mashin Khaneh =

Village in Gilan province, Iran

Mashin Khaneh Persian: ماشين خانه
- Village
- Location within Iran
- Coordinates: 37°47′53″N 48°50′03″E
- Country: Iran
- Province: Gilan
- County: Talesh
- District: Central
- Rural District: Kuhestani-ye Talesh

Population (2016)
  - Total: 291
- Time zone: UTC+3:30 (IRST)

Mashin Khaneh (Persian: ماشين خانه) (Note: Also romanized as Māshīn Khāneh) is a village in Kuhestani-ye Talesh Rural District of the Central District in Talesh County, Gilan province, Iran.

== Demographics ==
=== Language ===
Linguistic composition of the village.

Mashin Khaneh linguistic composition
language	percent
Azerbaijani	80%
Talysh	15%
New Persian	5%

=== Population ===
At the time of the 2006 National Census, the village's population was 424 in 82 households. The following census in 2011 counted 402 people in 108 households. The 2016 census measured the population of the village as 291 people in 87 households.
