= Hendeh Garan =

Village in Gilan province, Iran

Hendeh Garan Persian: هنده گران
- Village
- Location within Iran
- Coordinates: 37°46′35″N 48°57′26″E
- Country: Iran
- Province: Gilan
- County: Talesh
- District: Central
- Rural District: Tula Rud

Population (2016)
  - Total: 511
- Time zone: UTC+3:30 (IRST)

Hendeh Garan (Persian: هنده گران) (Note: Also romanized as Hendeh Garān; also known as Hendeh Karān) is a village in Tula Rud Rural District of the Central District in Talesh County, Gilan province, Iran.

== Demographics ==
=== Population ===
At the time of the 2006 National Census, the village's population was 454 in 92 households. The following census in 2011 counted 481 people in 131 households. The 2016 census measured the population of the village as 511 people in 156 households.
