= Anush Mahalleh-ye Jow Kandan =

Village in Gilan province, Iran

Anush Mahalleh-ye Jow Kandan Persian: انوش محله جوكندان
- Village
- Location within Iran
- Coordinates: 37°48′43″N 48°55′20″E
- Country: Iran
- Province: Gilan
- County: Talesh
- District: Jokandan
- Rural District: Nilrud

Population (2016)
  - Total: 2,396
- Time zone: UTC+3:30 (IRST)

Anush Mahalleh-ye Jow Kandan (Persian: انوش محله جوكندان) (Note: Also romanized as Anūsh Maḩalleh-ye Jow Kandān; also known as Alūsh Maḩalleh, Anūsh Maḩalleh, and Khvājeh Karī) is a village in Nilrud Rural District of Jokandan District in Talesh County, Gilan province, Iran, serving as capital of the district.

== Demographics ==
=== Language ===
Linguistic composition of the village.

Anush Mahalle-ye Jowkandan linguistic composition
language	percent
Talysh	75%
New Persian	20%
Azerbaijani	5%

=== Population ===
At the time of the 2006 National Census, the village's population was 2,162 in 457 households, when it was in the Central District. The following census in 2011 counted 2,280 people in 597 households. The 2016 census measured the population of the village as 2,396 people in 667 households. It was the most populous village in its rural district

In 2024, the rural district was separated from the district in the formation of Jokandan District, and Anush Mahalleh-ye Jow Kandan was transferred to Nilrud Rural District created in the new district.
