= Anush Mahalleh =

Village in Gilan province, Iran

Anush Mahalleh Persian: انوش محله
- Village
- Location within Iran
- Coordinates: 37°48′45″N 48°55′20″E
- Country: Iran
- Province: Gilan
- County: Talesh
- District: Central
- Rural District: Tula Rud

Population (2016)
  - Total: 569
- Time zone: UTC+3:30 (IRST)

Anush Mahalleh (Persian: انوش محله) (Note: Also romanized as Anūsh Maḩalleh; also known as Anūsh Maḩalleh-ye Avval, Jowkandān-e Avval, and Jūkandān-e Kūchek) is a village in Tula Rud Rural District of the Central District in Talesh County, Gilan province, Iran.

== Demographics ==
=== Population ===
At the time of the 2006 National Census, the village's population was 588 in 131 households. The following census in 2011 counted 597 people in 155 households. The 2016 census measured the population of the village as 569 people in 161 households.
