= Sardab Khaneh Posht =

Village in Gilan province, Iran

Sardab Khaneh Posht Persian: سرداب خانه پشت
- Village
- Location within Iran
- Coordinates: 37°46′00″N 48°42′50″E
- Country: Iran
- Province: Gilan
- County: Talesh
- District: Central
- Rural District: Kuhestani-ye Talesh

Population (2016)
  - Total: 203
- Time zone: UTC+3:30 (IRST)

Sardab Khaneh Posht (Persian: سرداب خانه پشت) (Note: Also romanized as Sardāb Khāneh Posht; also known as Sardākhānehposht) is a village in Kuhestani-ye Talesh Rural District of the Central District in Talesh County, Gilan province, Iran.

== Demographics ==
=== Population ===
At the time of the 2006 National Census, the village's population was 96 in 18 households. The following census in 2011 counted 144 people in 35 households. The 2016 census measured the population of the village as 203 people in 58 households.
