= Bareh Posht =

Village in Gilan province, Iran

Bareh Posht Persian: بره پشت
- Village
- Location within Iran
- Coordinates: 37°50′20″N 48°47′00″E
- Country: Iran
- Province: Gilan
- County: Talesh
- District: Central
- Rural District: Kuhestani-ye Talesh

Population (2016)
  - Total: 422
- Time zone: UTC+3:30 (IRST)

Bareh Posht (Persian: بره پشت) (Note: Also known as Baraposht) is a village in Kuhestani-ye Talesh Rural District of the Central District in Talesh County, Gilan province, Iran.

== Demographics ==
=== Population ===
At the time of the 2006 National Census, the village's population was 311 in 77 households. The following census in 2011 counted 363 people in 99 households. The 2016 census measured the population of the village as 422 people in 127 households.
