= Zarbil, Gilan =

Village in Gilan province, Iran

Zarbil Persian: زربيل
- Village
- Location within Iran
- Coordinates: 37°49′14″N 48°43′28″E
- Country: Iran
- Province: Gilan
- County: Talesh
- District: Central
- Rural District: Kuhestani-ye Talesh

Population (2016)
  - Total: 251
- Time zone: UTC+3:30 (IRST)

Zarbil (Persian: زربيل) (Note: Also romanized as Zarbīl) is a village in Kuhestani-ye Talesh Rural District of the Central District in Talesh County, Gilan province, Iran.

== Demographics ==
=== Population ===
At the time of the 2006 National Census, the village's population was 269 in 66 households. The following census in 2011 counted 245 people in 61 households. The 2016 census measured the population of the village as 251 people in 72 households.
