= Nilrud Rural District =

Rural district in Gilan province, Iran

Nilrud Rural District Persian: دهستان نیل‌رود
- Rural District
- Location within Iran
- Coordinates: 37°54′N 48°54′E
- Country: Iran
- Province: Gilan
- County: Talesh
- District: Jokandan
- Established: 2024
- Capital: Jow Kandan-e Bozorg
- Time zone: UTC+3:30 (IRST)

Nilrud Rural District (Persian: دهستان نیل‌رود) is in Jokandan District of Talesh County, Gilan province, in northwestern Iran. Its capital is the village of Jow Kandan-e Bozorg, whose population at the time of the 2016 National Census was 990 people in 281 households.

== History ==
In 2024, Saheli-ye Jokandan Rural District was separated from the Central District in the formation of Jokandan District, and Nilrud Rural District was created in the new district.

== Other villages in the rural district ==
- Dirakari
- Dizgah Mahalleh
- Khvajeh Geri
- Peysara
- Qanbar Mahalleh
- Sheykh Mahalleh
- Siah Gol
- Tork Mahalleh
