= Bask, Gilan =

Village in Gilan province, Iran

Bask Persian: بسک
- Village
- Location within Iran
- Coordinates: 37°54′38″N 48°45′37″E
- Country: Iran
- Province: Gilan
- County: Talesh
- District: Central
- Rural District: Kuhestani-ye Talesh

Population (2016)
  - Total: 411
- Time zone: UTC+3:30 (IRST)

Bask (Persian: بسک) (Note: Also romanized as Basak; also known as Mīndogū) is a village in Kuhestani-ye Talesh Rural District of the Central District in Talesh County, Gilan province, Iran.

== Demographics ==
=== Population ===
At the time of the 2006 National Census, the village's population was 323 in 83 households. The following census in 2011 counted 376 people in 94 households. The 2016 census measured the population of the village as 411 people in 113 households.
