= Mian Kuh, Gilan =

Village in Gilan province, Iran

Mian Kuh Persian: ميانكوه
- Village
- Location within Iran
- Coordinates: 37°49′26″N 48°57′40″E
- Country: Iran
- Province: Gilan
- County: Talesh
- District: Central
- Rural District: Tula Rud

Population (2016)
  - Total: 704
- Time zone: UTC+3:30 (IRST)

Mian Kuh (Persian: ميانكوه) (Note: Also romanized as Mīān Kūh) is a village in Tula Rud Rural District of the Central District in Talesh County, Gilan province, Iran.

== Demographics ==
=== Population ===
At the time of the 2006 National Census, the village's population was 603 in 137 households. The following census in 2011 counted 666 people in 172 households. The 2016 census measured the population of the village as 704 people in 214 households.
