= Kishavisheh-ye Olya =

Village in Gilan province, Iran

Kishavisheh-ye Olya Persian: كيشاويشه عليا
- Village
- Location within Iran
- Coordinates: 37°45′33″N 48°55′15″E
- Country: Iran
- Province: Gilan
- County: Talesh
- District: Central
- Rural District: Tula Rud

Population (2016)
  - Total: 1,763
- Time zone: UTC+3:30 (IRST)

Kishavisheh-ye Olya (Persian: كيشاويشه عليا) (Note: Also romanized as Kīshāvīsheh-ye ‘Olyā; also known as Keshāvosheh Bālā and Keshāvosheh ‘Olyā) is a village in Tula Rud Rural District of the Central District in Talesh County, Gilan province, Iran.

== Demographics ==
=== Population ===
At the time of the 2006 National Census, the village's population was 1,087 in 238 households. The following census in 2011 counted 1,156 people in 286 households. The 2016 census measured the population of the village as 1,763 people in 476 households. It was the most populous village in its rural district.
