= Razeh, Gilan =

Village in Gilan province, Iran

Razeh Persian: رزه
- Village
- Location within Iran
- Coordinates: 37°52′08″N 48°46′44″E
- Country: Iran
- Province: Gilan
- County: Talesh
- District: Central
- Rural District: Kuhestani-ye Talesh

Population (2016)
  - Total: 232
- Time zone: UTC+3:30 (IRST)

Razeh (Persian: رزه) (Note: Also romanized as Rezeh) is a village in Kuhestani-ye Talesh Rural District of the Central District in Talesh County, Gilan province, Iran.

== Demographics ==
=== Population ===
At the time of the 2006 National Census, the village's population was 304 in 66 households. The following census in 2011 counted 257 people in 69 households. The 2016 census measured the population of the village as 232 people in 70 households.
