= Kishavisheh-ye Sofla =

Village in Gilan province, Iran

Kishavisheh-ye Sofla Persian: كيشاويشه سفلي
- Village
- Location within Iran
- Coordinates: 37°45′10″N 48°55′38″E
- Country: Iran
- Province: Gilan
- County: Talesh
- District: Central
- Rural District: Tula Rud

Population (2016)
  - Total: 968
- Time zone: UTC+3:30 (IRST)

Kishavisheh-ye Sofla (Persian: كيشاويشه سفلي) (Note: Also romanized as Kīshāvīsheh-ye Soflá; also known as Kasha-Veshakh, Kashāvasheh, Keshaweshah, and Khashavar) is a village in Tula Rud Rural District of the Central District in Talesh County, Gilan province, Iran.

== Demographics ==
=== Population ===
At the time of the 2006 National Census, the village's population was 836 in 187 households. The following census in 2011 counted 844 people in 224 households. The 2016 census measured the population of the village as 968 people in 283 households.
