= Jowlandan =

Village in Gilan province, Iran

Jowlandan Persian: جولندان
- Village
- Location within Iran
- Coordinates: 37°47′32″N 48°56′18″E
- Country: Iran
- Province: Gilan
- County: Talesh
- District: Central
- Rural District: Tula Rud

Population (2016)
  - Total: 567
- Time zone: UTC+3:30 (IRST)

Jowlandan (Persian: جولندان) (Note: Also romanized as Jowlandān; also known as Mīnārabīn) is a village in Tula Rud Rural District of the Central District in Talesh County, Gilan province, Iran.

== Demographics ==
=== Population ===
At the time of the 2006 National Census, the village's population was 273 in 54 households. The following census in 2011 counted 236 people in 65 households. The 2016 census measured the population of the village as 567 people in 187 households.
