= Mitra Farazandeh =

Iranian disability activist and artist

- میترا فرازنده
- Born: c. 1976 (age 48–49); Hashtpar, Iran
- Occupation(s): Disability activist and advocate, visual artist
- Awards: 100 Women (BBC) (2018)

Mitra Farazandeh (Persian: میترا فرازنده; born c. 1976) is an Iranian disability activist and visual artist.

== Biography ==
Mitra Farazandeh was born in Tālesh city in northwestern Iran. She has a physical deformity. She lives in a village in Hashtpar (the city of Talesh) in the Gilan province of Iran.

Farazandeh has advocated for the visibility of sexual desire of women with disabilities. She writes about not feeling human due to her physical disability and struggling to recognize a need for love; and how her physical body has created false perceptions of her not having sexual needs. She earns a living by selling her drawings and paintings.

In 2018, Farazandeh is on the BBC's 100 Women award list of the most inspiring and influential women in the world.

== See also ==
- Disability rights movement
