= Maryan, Gilan =

Village in Gilan province, Iran

Maryan Persian: مريان
- Village
- Location within Iran
- Coordinates: 37°51′33″N 48°39′22″E
- Country: Iran
- Province: Gilan
- County: Talesh
- District: Central
- Rural District: Kuhestani-ye Talesh

Population (2016)
  - Total: 219
- Time zone: UTC+3:30 (IRST)

Maryan (Persian: مريان) (Note: Also romanized as Maryān, Mar’yan, and Meryān) is a village in Kuhestani-ye Talesh Rural District of the Central District in Talesh County, Gilan province, Iran.

== Demographics ==
=== Language ===
Linguistic composition of the village.

Maryan linguistic composition
language	percent
Azerbaijani	100%

=== Population ===
At the time of the 2006 National Census, the village's population was 86 in 19 households. The following census in 2011 counted 45 people in 14 households. The 2016 census measured the population of the village as 219 people in 65 households.

== Archeology ==
Near Maryan is an Iron Age cemetery excavated in 1994.
