= Hareh Dasht =

Village in Gilan province, Iran

Hareh Dasht Persian: هره‌دشت
- Village
- Location within Iran
- Coordinates: 37°57′43″N 48°53′04″E
- Country: Iran
- Province: Gilan
- County: Talesh
- District: Kargan Rud
- Rural District: Lisar

Population (2016)
  - Total: 1,569
- Time zone: UTC+3:30 (IRST)

Hareh Dasht (Persian: هره‌دشت) (Note: Also known as Haradasht, Harah Dasht-e Jonūbī, and Kharadasht) is a village in Lisar Rural District of Kargan Rud District in Talesh County, Gilan province, Iran.

== Demographics ==
=== Population ===
At the time of the 2006 National Census, the village's population was 1,495 in 375 households. The following census in 2011 counted 1,596 people in 470 households. The 2016 census measured the population of the village as 1,569 people in 503 households. It was the most populous village in its rural district.
