= Tula Rud-e Bala =

Village in Gilan province, Iran

Tula Rud-e Bala Persian: طولارود بالا
- Village
- Location within Iran
- Coordinates: 37°46′59″N 48°54′34″E
- Country: Iran
- Province: Gilan
- County: Talesh
- District: Central
- Rural District: Tula Rud

Population (2016)
  - Total: 1,139
- Time zone: UTC+3:30 (IRST)

Tula Rud-e Bala (Persian: طولارود بالا) (Note: Also romanized as Ţūlā Rūd-e Bālā; also known as Ţūlā Rūd) is a village in, and the capital of, Tula Rud Rural District in the Central District of Talesh County, Gilan province, Iran.

== Demographics ==
=== Language ===
Linguistic composition of the village.

Tula Rud-e Bala linguistic composition
language	percent
Talysh	60%
New Persian	35%
Azerbaijani	5%

=== Population ===
At the time of the 2006 National Census, the village's population was 2,039 in 476 households. The 2011 census counted 1,160 people in 308 households. The 2016 census measured the population of the village as 1,139 people in 317 households.
