= Aq Owlar =

Village in Gilan province, Iran

Aq Owlar Persian: آق‌اولر
- Village
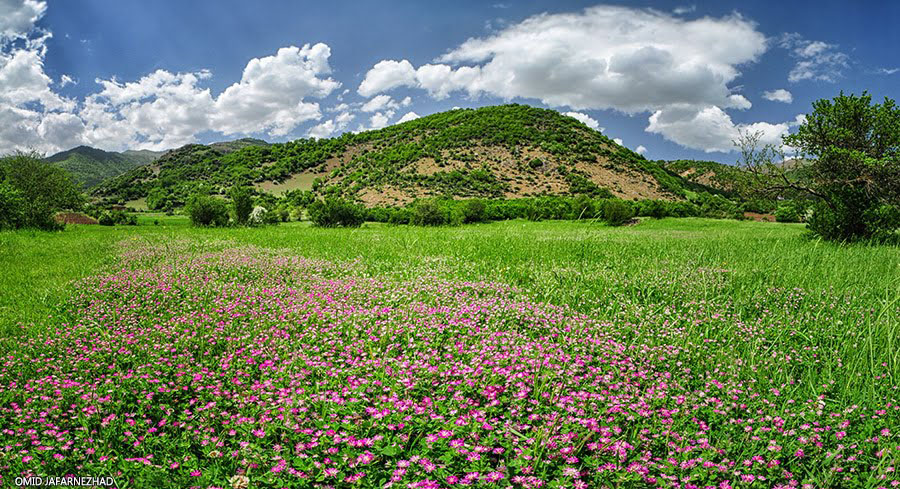
- Landscape near the village of Aq Owlar

- Location within Iran
- Coordinates: 37°51′21″N 48°38′57″E
- Country: Iran
- Province: Gilan
- County: Talesh
- District: Central
- Rural District: Kuhestani-ye Talesh

Population (2016)
  - Total: 205
- Time zone: UTC+3:30 (IRST)

Aq Owlar (Persian: آق‌اولر) (Note: Also romanized as Āq Evler and Āq Owlar; also known as Agavlar, Agawlar, Āqevlar, Meryān, Meryān va Āqevlar, and Now‘adī) is a village in Kuhestani-ye Talesh Rural District of the Central District in Talesh County, Gilan province, Iran.

== Demographics ==
=== Language ===
Linguistic composition of the village.

Aq Owlar linguistic composition
language	percent
Azerbaijani	70%
Talysh	30%

=== Population ===
At the time of the 2006 National Census, the village's population was 181 in 50 households. The following census in 2011 counted 55 people in 16 households. The 2016 census measured the population of the village as 205 people in 65 households.
