= Peysara, Kargan Rud =

Peysara پي سرا
- Village
- Interactive map of Peysara
- Coordinates: 37.980°N 48.859°E
- Country: Iran
- Province: Gilan
- County: Talesh
- Bakhsh: Kargan Rud
- Rural District: Lisar

Population (2016)
  - Total: 93
- Time zone: UTC+3:30 (IRST)

Peysara (Persian: پي سرا, also Romanized as Peysarā) is a village in Lisar Rural District, Kargan Rud District, Talesh County, Gilan Province, Iran. At the 2006 census, its population was 127, in 25 families.

At the time of the 2006 National Census, the village's population was 127 in 25 households. The following census in 2011 counted 87 people in 21 households. The 2016 census measured the population of the village as 93 people in 27 households.
