= Nowmandan =

Nowmandan نومندان
- Village
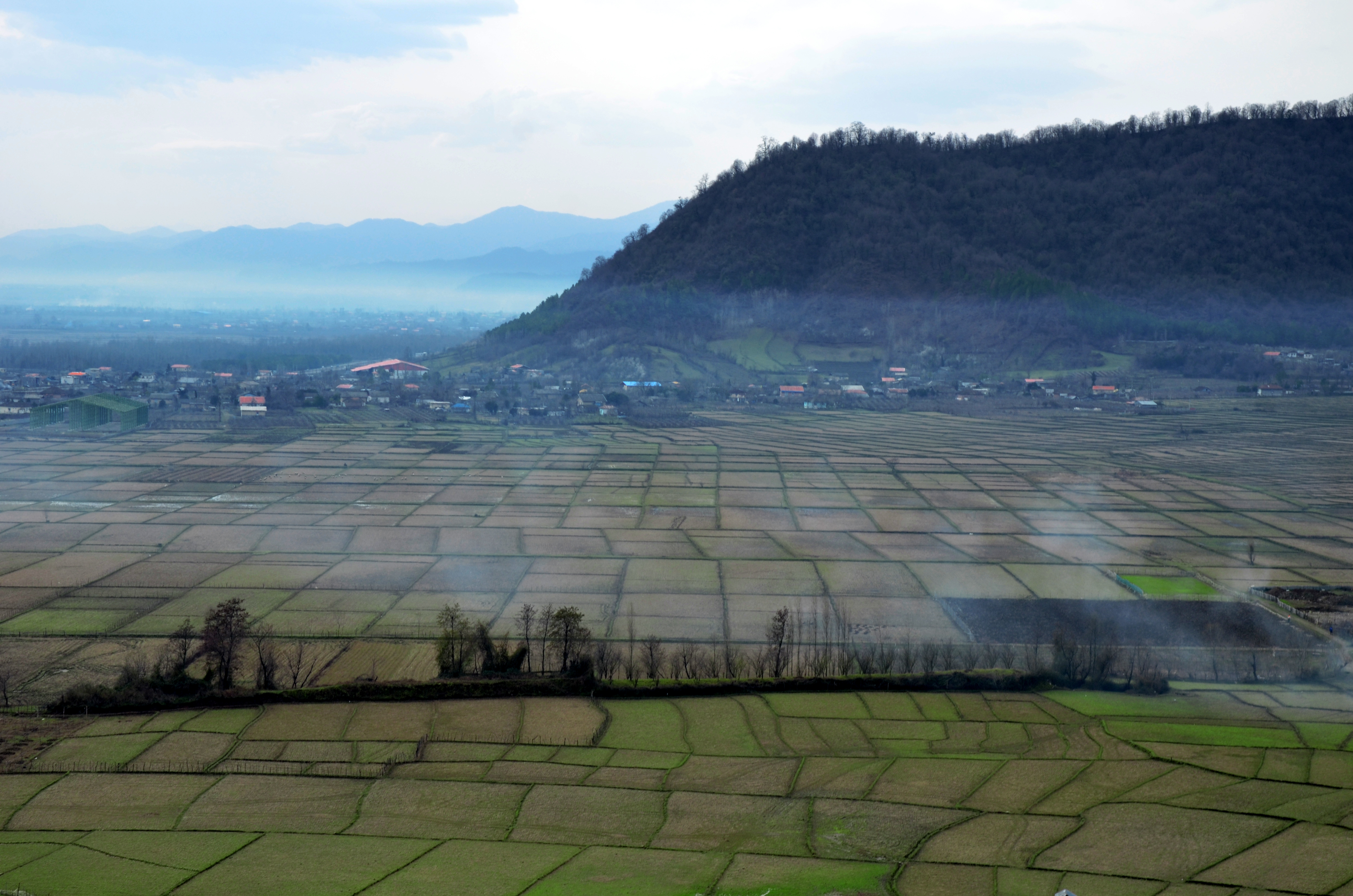

- Location within Iran
- Coordinates: 37°56′52″N 48°53′29″E
- Country: Iran
- Province: Gilan
- County: Talesh
- Bakhsh: Kargan Rud
- Rural District: Lisar

Population (2016)
  - Total: 350
- Time zone: UTC+3:30 (IRST)

Nowmandan (Persian: نومندان, also Romanized as Nowmandān; also known as Namandan) is a village in Lisar Rural District, Kargan Rud District, Talesh County, Gilan Province, Iran. According to the 2016 census, its population was 350, in 114 families. Down from 362 in 2006.
