= Tālesh =

City in Gilan province, Iran

Tālesh Persian: تالش
- City
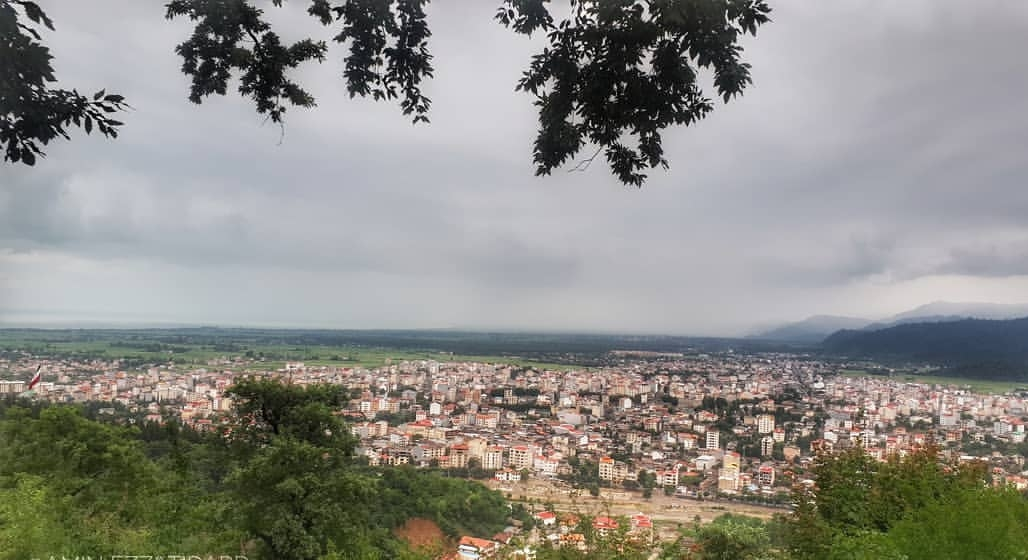
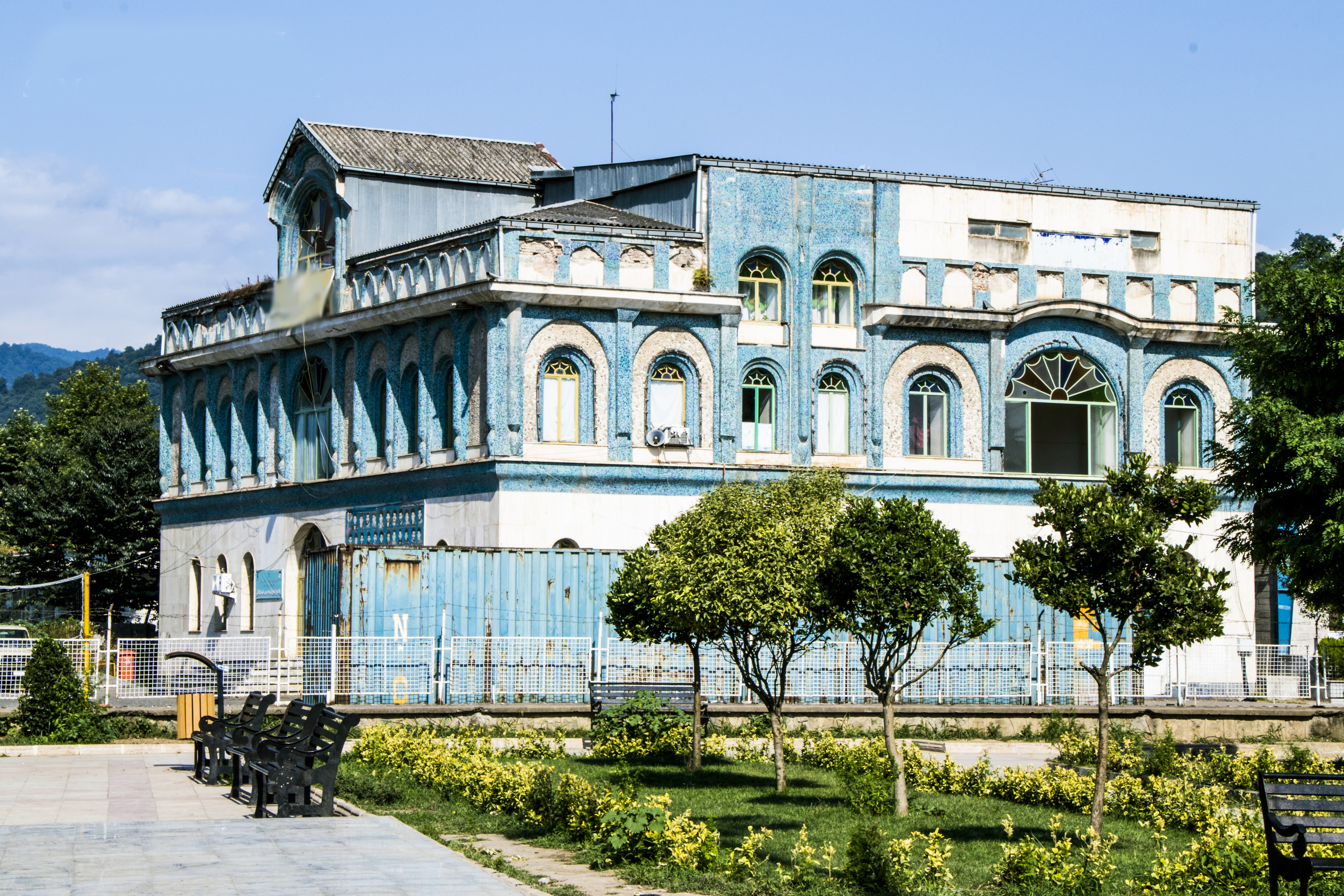
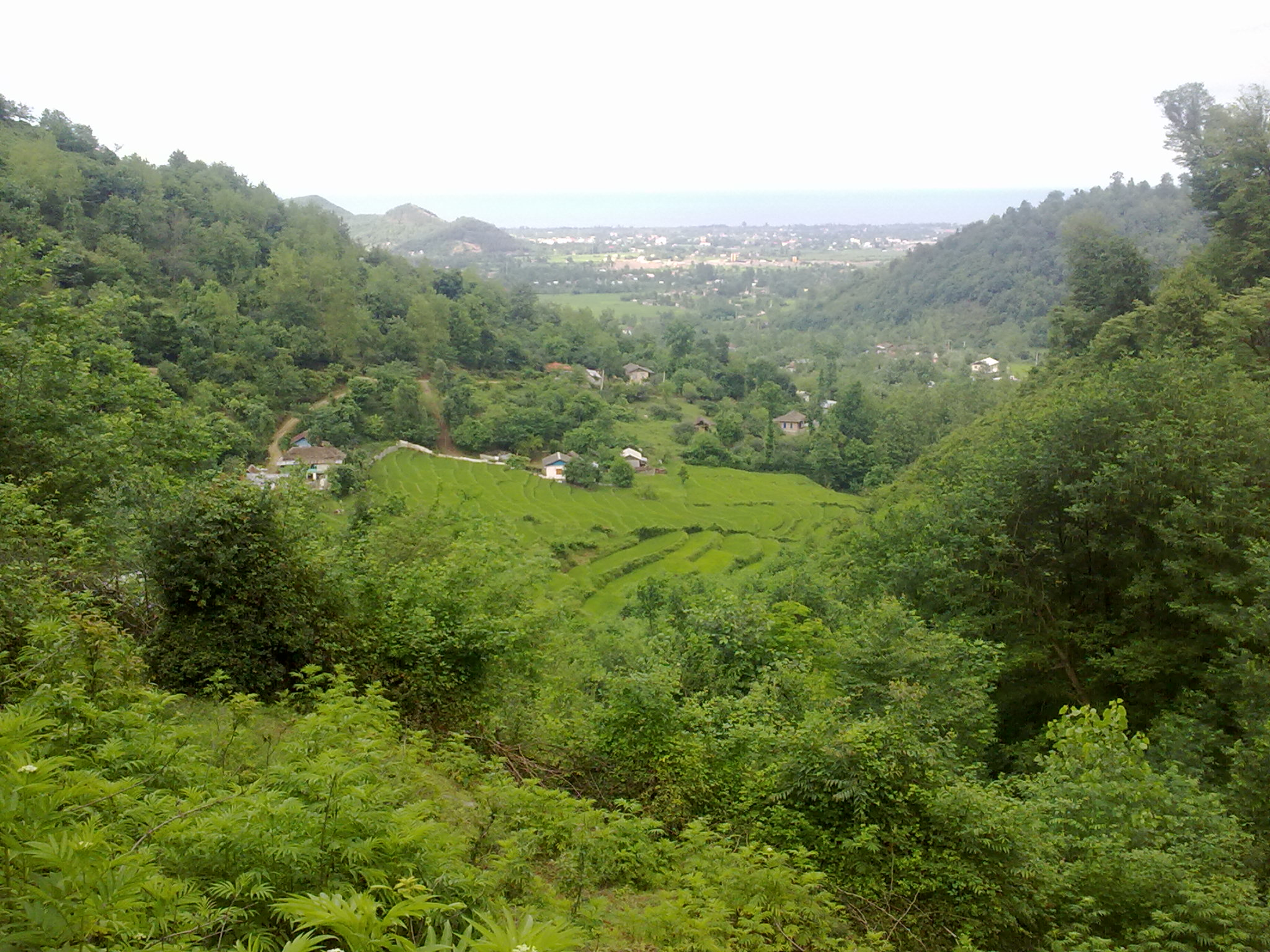
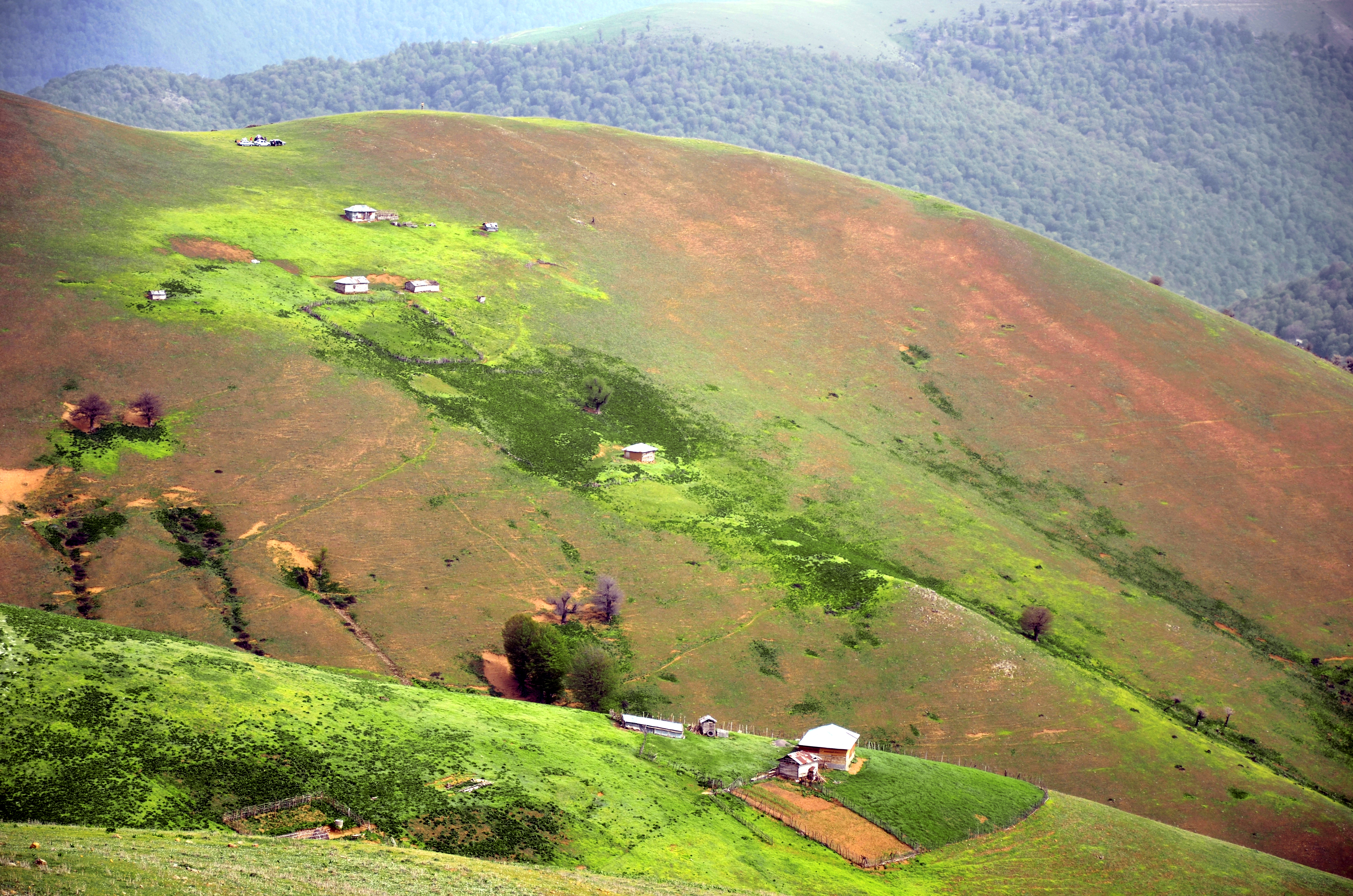
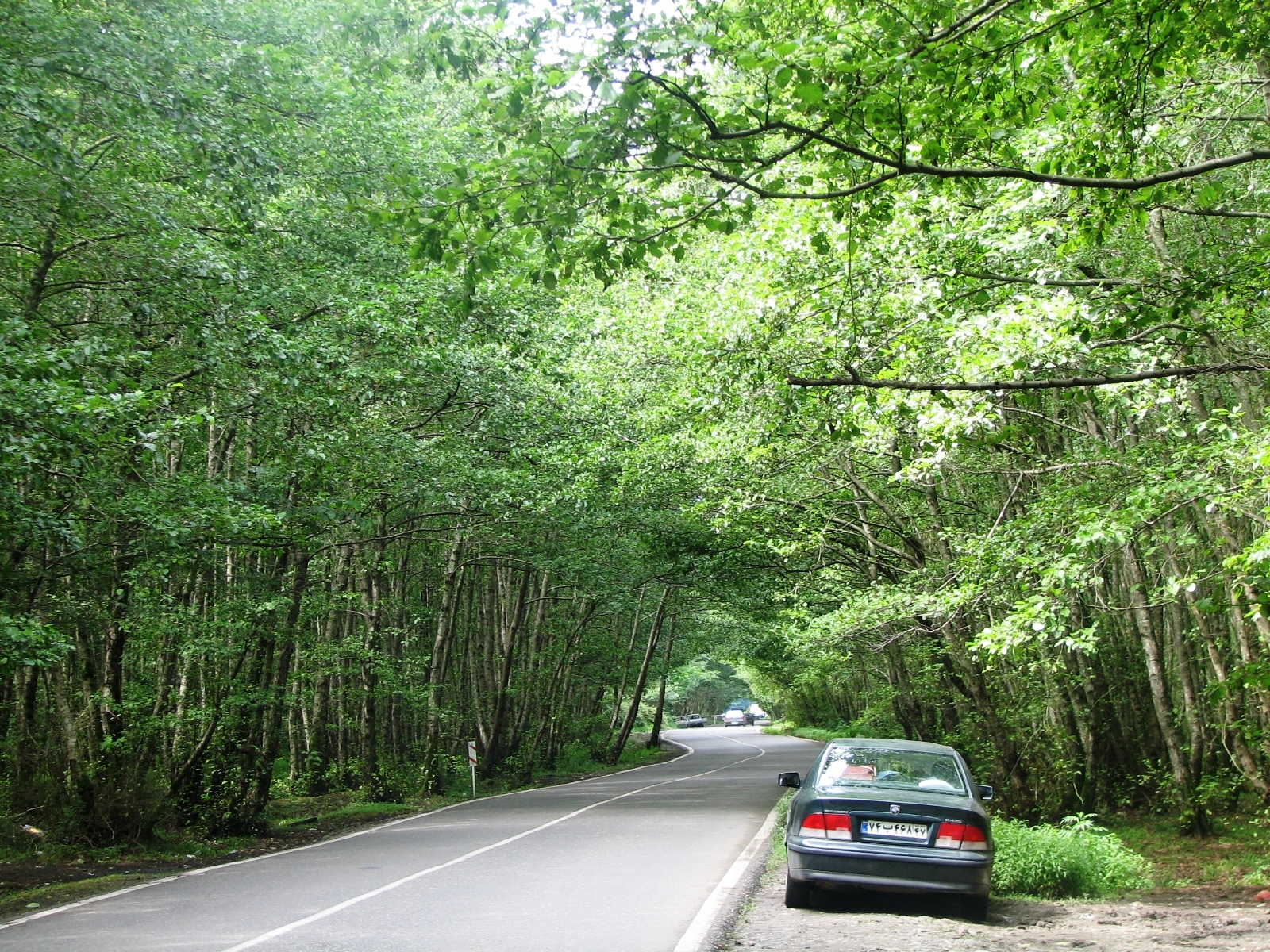

- Location within Iran
- Coordinates: 37°47′51″N 48°54′15″E
- Country: Iran
- Province: Gilan
- County: Talesh
- District: Central

Population (2016)
  - Total: 54,178
- Time zone: UTC+3:30 (IRST)

Tālesh (Persian: تالش) (Note: Also romanized as Talesh; also known as Hashpar, Hashtpar, and Hashtpar-e Tavalesh) is a city in the Central District of Talesh County, Gilan province, Iran, serving as capital of both the county and the district.

== Demographics ==
=== Language ===
The Iranian dialect of Tālesh is a dialect of Talysh language. The Iranian disability activist and artist Mitra Farazandeh was born in this town.

Linguistic composition of the city.

Tālesh linguistic composition
language	percent
Talysh	80%
Azerbaijani	10%
New Persian	8%
Northern Kurdish	2%

=== Population ===
At the time of the 2006 National Census, the city's population was 41,486 in 10,688 households. The following census in 2011 counted 52,344 people in 14,984 households. The 2016 census measured the population of the city as 54,178 people in 16,832 households.
