= Saheli-ye Jokandan Rural District =

Rural district in Gilan province, Iran

Saheli-ye Jokandan Rural District Persian: دهستان ساحلي جوكندان
- Rural District
- Location within Iran
- Coordinates: 37°52′N 48°54′E
- Country: Iran
- Province: Gilan
- County: Talesh
- District: Jokandan
- Established: 1987
- Capital: Chelownah Sar

Population (2016)
  - Total: 19,442
- Time zone: UTC+3:30 (IRST)

Saheli-ye Jokandan Rural District (Persian: دهستان ساحلي جوكندان) is in Jokandan District of Talesh County, Gilan province, in northwestern Iran. Its capital is the village of Chelownah Sar.

== Demographics ==
=== Population ===
At the time of the 2006 National Census, the village's population (as a part of the Central District) was 18,232 in 4,137 households. There were 18,515 inhabitants in 5,057 households at the following census of 2011. The 2016 census measured the population of the village as 19,442 in 5,585 households. The most populous of its 25 villages was Anush Mahalleh-ye Jow Kandan (now in Nilrud Rural District), with 2,396 people.

In 2024, the rural district was separated from the district in the formation of Jokandan District.

=== Other villages in the rural district ===
- Dul Beyn
- Jamakuh
- Khaseh Sara
- Kuakari
- Nasur Mahalleh
- Poshteh
- Shilan
- Tangdeh Tul Gilan
- Titak
