= Tula Rud Rural District =

Rural district in Gilan province, Iran

Tula Rud Rural District Persian: دهستان طولارود
- Rural District
- Location within Iran
- Coordinates: 37°45′N 48°47′E
- Country: Iran
- Province: Gilan
- County: Talesh
- District: Central
- Established: 1987
- Capital: Tula Rud-e Bala

Population (2016)
  - Total: 16,880
- Time zone: UTC+3:30 (IRST)

Tula Rud Rural District (Persian: دهستان طولارود) is in the Central District of Talesh County, Gilan province, in northwestern Iran. Its capital is the village of Tula Rud-e Bala.

== Demographics ==
=== Population ===
At the time of the 2006 National Census, the rural district's population was 19,061 in 4,280 households. There were 15,205 inhabitants in 4,043 households at the following census of 2011. The 2016 census measured the population of the rural district as 16,880 in 4,918 households. The most populous of its 36 villages was Kishavisheh-ye Olya, with 1,763 people.

=== Other villages in the rural district ===
- Anbara Posht
- Anush Mahalleh
- Derazlu
- Hendeh Garan
- Jowlandan
- Khalifeh Gari
- Kishavisheh-ye Sofla
- Mian Kuh
- Nalband
- Owleh Kari-ye Tula Rud
- Qoruq
- Rahnama Mahalleh
- Rik
- Saragah
- Suraposht
- Takiabad
- Tazehabad
