= Jokandan District =

District in Gilan province, Iran

Jokandan District Persian: بخش جوکندان
- District
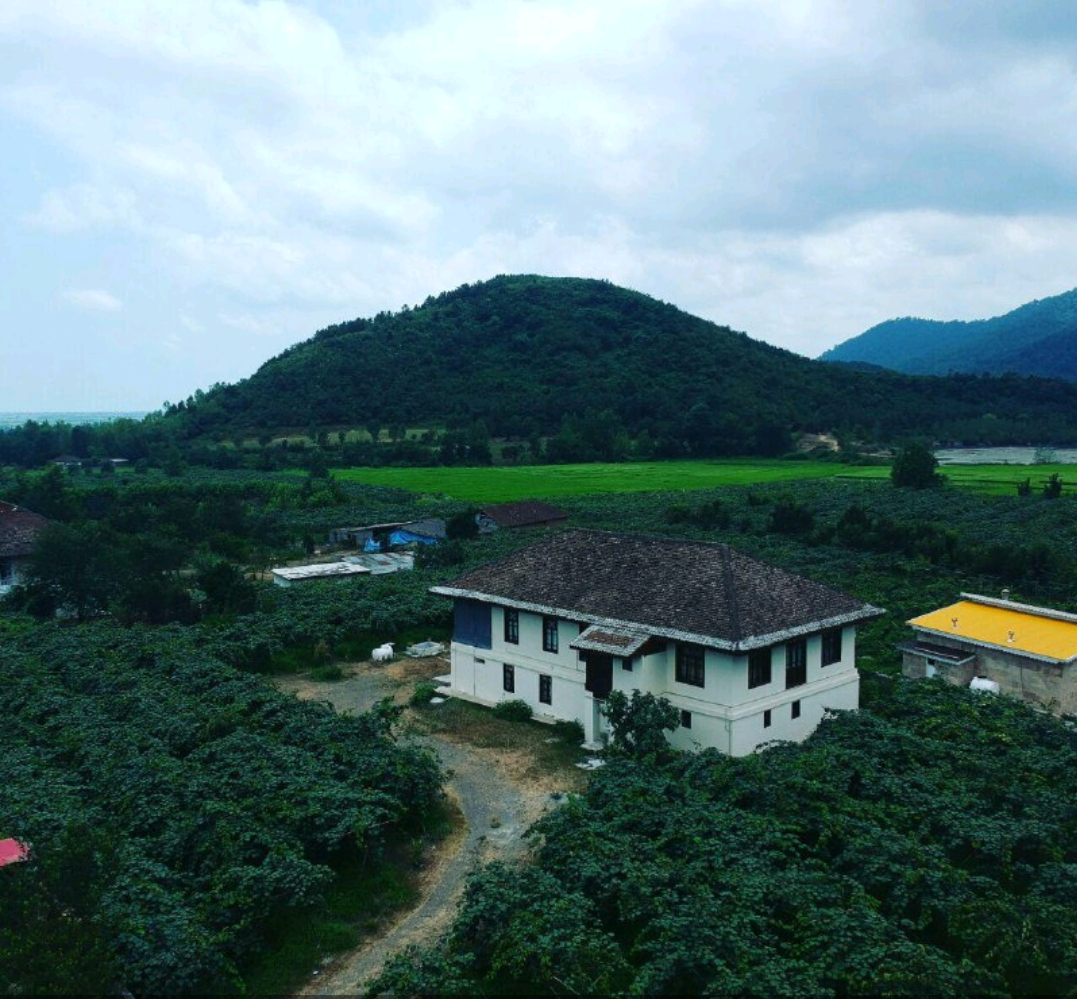
- A traditional house in Jokandan

- Location within Iran
- Coordinates: 37°51′N 48°55′E
- Country: Iran
- Province: Gilan
- County: Talesh
- Established: 2024
- Capital: Anush Mahalleh-ye Jow Kandan
- Time zone: UTC+3:30 (IRST)

Jokandan District (Persian: بخش جوکندان) is in Talesh County, Gilan province, in northwestern Iran. Its capital is the village of Anush Mahalleh-ye Jow Kandan, whose population at the time of the 2016 National Census was 2,396 people in 667 households.

== History ==
In 2024, Saheli-ye Jokandan Rural District was separated from the Central District in the formation of Jokandan District.

== Demographics ==
=== Administrative divisions ===
Jokandan District
Administrative Divisions
Nilrud RD
Saheli-ye Jokandan RD
RD = Rural District
