= Kuhestani-ye Talesh Rural District =

Rural district in Gilan province, Iran

Kuhestani-ye Talesh Rural District Persian: دهستان كوهستاني تالش
- Rural District
- Location within Iran
- Coordinates: 37°50′N 48°41′E
- Country: Iran
- Province: Gilan
- County: Talesh
- District: Central
- Established: 1987
- Capital: Kashtami

Population (2016)
  - Total: 7,482
- Time zone: UTC+3:30 (IRST)

Kuhestani-ye Talesh Rural District (Persian: دهستان كوهستاني تالش) is in the Central District of Talesh County, Gilan province, Iran. Its capital is the village of Kashtami.

== Demographics ==
=== Population ===
At the time of the 2006 National Census, the rural district's population was 6,479 in 1,512 households. There were 5,914 inhabitants in 1,594 households at the following census of 2011. The 2016 census measured the population of the rural district as 7,482 in 2,254 households. The most populous of its 64 villages was Kashtami, with 603 people.

=== Other villages in the rural district ===
- Aq Owlar
- Bareh Posht
- Bask
- Bilyabin
- Kasemjan
- Lor
- Maryan
- Mashin Khaneh
- Razeh
- Sardab Khaneh Posht
- Shileh Vasht
- Zarbil
