= Central District (Talesh County) =

District in Gilan province, Iran

Central District (Talesh County) Persian: بخش مرکزی شهرستان تالش
- District
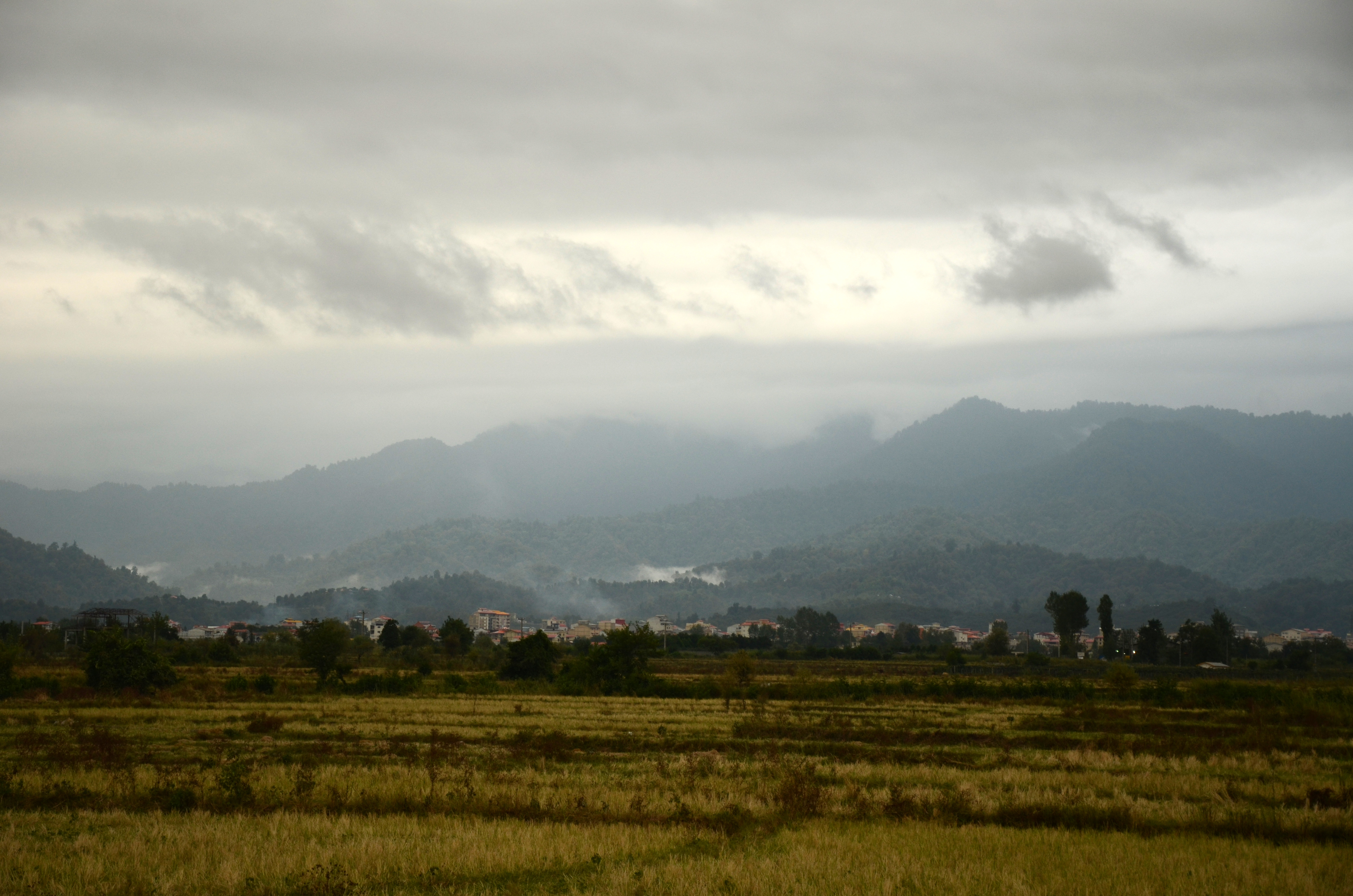
- The city of Talesh with Talysh Mountains

- Location within Iran
- Coordinates: 37°48′N 48°46′E
- Country: Iran
- Province: Gilan
- County: Talesh
- Capital: Tālesh

Population (2016)
  - Total: 97,982
- Time zone: UTC+3:30 (IRST)

The Central District of Talesh County (Persian: بخش مرکزی شهرستان تالش) is in Gilan province, in northwestern Iran. Its capital is the city of Tālesh.

== History ==
In 2024, Saheli-ye Jokandan Rural District was separated from the district in the formation of Jokandan District.

== Demographics ==
=== Population ===
At the time of the 2006 National Census, the district's population was 85,258 in 20,617 households. The following census in 2011 counted 91,978 people in 25,678 households. The 2016 census measured the population of the district as 97,982 inhabitants in 29,589 households.

=== Administrative divisions ===
Central District (Talesh County) Population
Administrative Divisions	2006	2011	2016
Kuhestani-ye Talesh RD	6,479	5,914	7,482
Saheli-ye Jokandan RD (Note: Transferred to Jokandan District after the 2016 census)	18,232	18,515	19,442
Tula Rud RD	19,061	15,205	16,880
Tālesh (city)	41,486	52,344	54,178
Total	85,258	91,978	97,982
RD = Rural District
