= Keshavarz =

Keshavarz may refer to:

== People ==
- Fatemeh Keshavarz (born 1952), Iranian academic, writer and literary figure
- Maryam Keshavarz (born 1975), American filmmaker
- Mohammad Keshavarz (born 1982), Iranian futsal player
- Mohammad-Ali Keshavarz (1930-2020), Iranian actor
- Sousan Keshavarz, Iranian politician

== Places ==
- Keshavarz, Iran, a city in West Azerbaijan Province
- Keshavarz-e Khotbeh Sara, a village in Gilan Province
- Keshavarz District, in West Azerbaijan Province
- Keshavarz Rural District, in West Azerbaijan Province

== Sport ==
- Keshavarz F.C., a defunct Iranian football club
- Keshavarz Golestan F.C., an Iranian football club

== Other uses ==
- Keshavarzi Bank
