= Namazi Mahalleh =

Namazi Mahalleh نمازی محله
- Village
- Location within Iran
- Coordinates: 37°58′29″N 48°53′48″E
- Country: Iran
- Province: Gilan
- County: Talesh
- Bakhsh: Kargan Rud
- Rural District: Lisar

Population (2016)
  - Total: 197
- Time zone: UTC+3:30 (IRST)

Namazi Mahalleh (Persian: نمازی محله, also Romanized as Namāzī Maḩalleh; also known as Kalbāfaraj Maḩalleh) is a village in Lisar Rural District, Kargan Rud District, Talesh County, Gilan Province, Iran. It is northwest of Lisar city and north of Lisar river.

At the time of the 2006 National Census, the village's population was 191 in 45 households. The following census in 2011 counted 216 people in 60 households. The 2016 census measured the population of the village as 197 people in 64 households.
