= Dayuan (disambiguation) =

Dayuan is the Chinese exonym for a country that existed in Ferghana valley in Central Asia.

Dayuan may also refer to:

- Dayuan District, Taoyuan, Taiwan
- Ang Da Yuan (洪达远 Hóng Dáyuǎn), one of the seven perpetrators of the 2019 Orchard Towers murder

== See also ==
- Dayuan station (disambiguation)
- Davan (disambiguation)
- Dawan (disambiguation)
