= Amir Beyglu =

Amir Beyglu اميربيگلو
- Village
- Location within Iran
- Coordinates: 37°57′00″N 48°55′08″E
- Country: Iran
- Province: Gilan
- County: Talesh
- Bakhsh: Kargan Rud
- Rural District: Lisar

Population (2016)
  - Total: 194
- Time zone: UTC+3:30 (IRST)

Amir Beyglu (Persian: اميربيگلو, also Romanized as Amīr Beyglū; also known as Amīr Beglū) is a village in Lisar Rural District, Kargan Rud District, Talesh County, Gilan Province, Iran. It is southeast of Lisar in a short distance of the Caspian Sea

At the time of the 2006 National Census, the village's population was 168 in 33 households. The following census in 2011 counted 186 people in 56 households. The 2016 census measured the population of the village as 194 people in 66 households.
