= Tizkharab =

Tizkharab or Tizkhar Ab (Persian: تيزخراب) may refer to:

- Tizkharab, Salmas
- Tizkharab, Urmia
- Tizkharab, Rowzeh Chay, Urmia County

== See also ==
- Tez Kharab (disambiguation)
