= Pareh, Iran =

Pareh (Persian: پاره or پره) may refer to:

- Pareh, East Azerbaijan (پره - Pareh)
- Pareh, Gilan (پره - Pareh)
- Pareh, Izeh, Khuzestan Province (پره - Pareh)
- Pareh-ye Olya, West Azerbaijan Province (پاره - Pāreh)
- Pareh-ye Sofla, West Azerbaijan Province (پاره - Pāreh)
