= Osman Owlan =

Osman Owlan عثمان اولن
- Village
- Location within Iran
- Coordinates: 36°53′23″N 46°35′50″E
- Country: Iran
- Province: West Azerbaijan
- County: Shahin Dezh
- Bakhsh: Keshavarz
- Rural District: Chaharduli

Population (2006)
  - Total: 93
- Time zone: UTC+3:30 (IRST)
  - Summer (DST): UTC+4:30 (IRDT)

Osman Owlan (Persian: عثمان اولن, also Romanized as ‘Os̄mān Owlan and ‘Os̄mān Ūlan) is a village in Chaharduli Rural District, Keshavarz District, Shahin Dezh County, West Azerbaijan Province, Iran. At the 2006 census, its population was 93, in 16 families.
