= Homasar =

Homasar هماسر
- Village
- Location within Iran
- Coordinates: 37°57′00″N 48°48′55″E
- Country: Iran
- Province: Gilan
- County: Talesh
- Bakhsh: Kargan Rud
- Rural District: Lisar

Population (2006)
  - Total: 24
- Time zone: UTC+3:30 (IRST)

Homasar (Persian: هماسر, also Romanized as Homāsar) is a yaylak and village in Lisar Rural District, Kargan Rud District, Talesh County, Gilan Province, Iran.

At the 2006 census, its population was 24, in 5 families. The following census in 2011 reported a permanent population of 0, stating that it is populated from May to October. The 2016 census measured the permanent population of the village as less than 4 households.
