= Shad Milarzan =

Shad Milarzan شادميلرزان
- Village
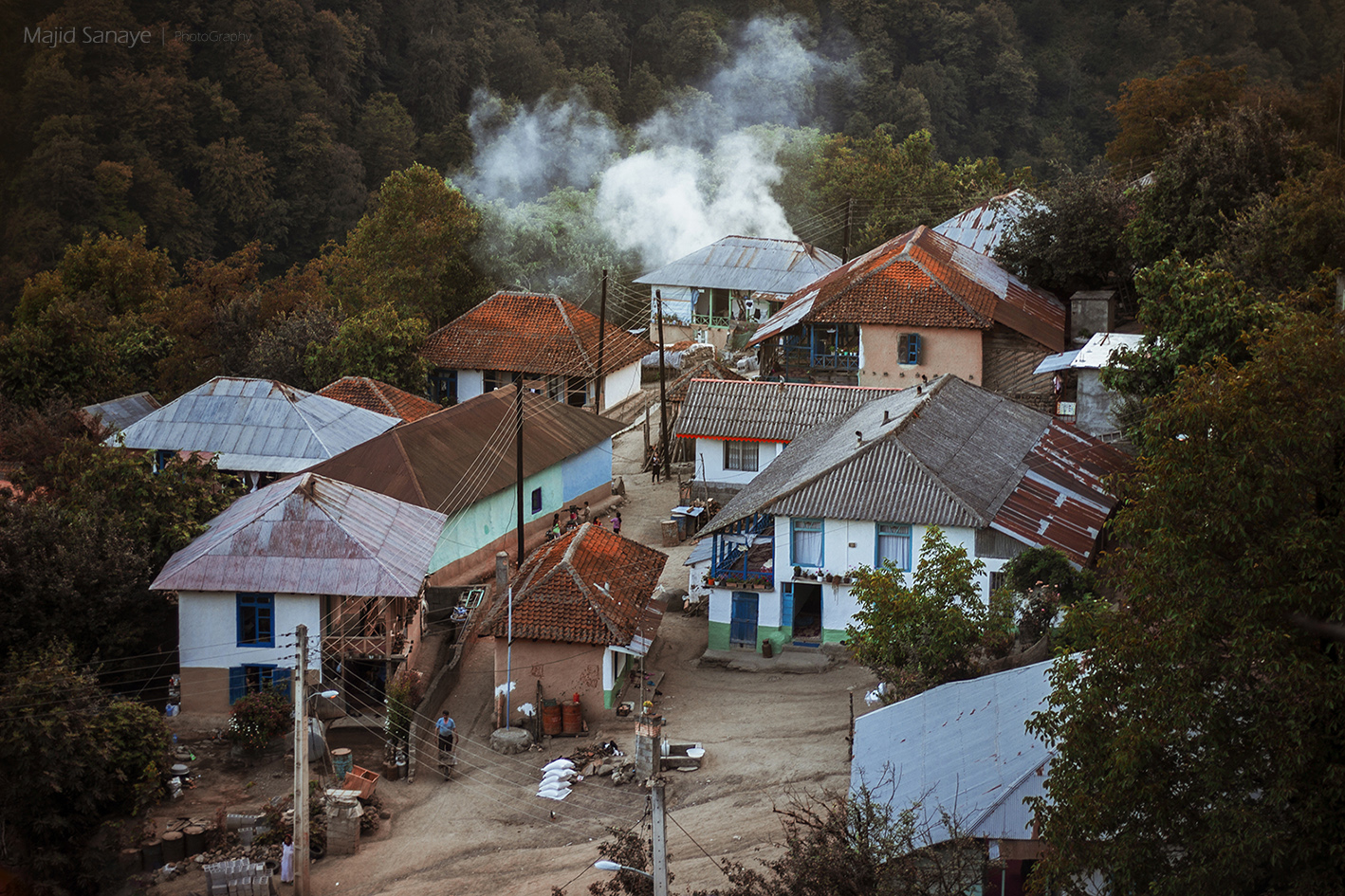

- Location within Iran
- Coordinates: 38°02′35″N 48°46′07″E
- Country: Iran
- Province: Gilan
- County: Talesh
- Bakhsh: Kargan Rud
- Rural District: Khotbeh Sara

Population (2016)
  - Total: 239
- Time zone: UTC+3:30 (IRST)

Shad Milarzan (Persian: شادميلرزان, also Romanized as Shād Mīlarzān; also known as Shāh Mīlarzān, Terbah, and Tūrbah) is a village in Khotbeh Sara Rural District, Kargan Rud District, Talesh County, Gilan Province, Iran. At the 2016 census, its population was 239, in 69 families. Up from 201 in 2006.
