= Latan Parat =

Latan Parat لتن پرت
- Village
- Interactive map of Latan Parat
- Coordinates: 37.9785°N 48.843°E
- Country: Iran
- Province: Gilan
- County: Talesh
- Bakhsh: Kargan Rud
- Rural District: Lisar

Population (2016)
  - Total: 38
- Time zone: UTC+3:30 (IRST)

Latan Parat (Persian: لتن پرت) is a village in Lisar Rural District, Kargan Rud District, Talesh County, Gilan Province, Iran.

At the 2006 census, its population was 71, in 16 families. The following census in 2011 reported no permanent population, stating that it is populated from May to October. The 2016 census measured the population of the village as 38 people in 11 households.
