= Lapaqa Sadeq =

Lapaqa Sadeq لپاقاصدق
- Village
- Interactive map of Lapaqa Sadeq
- Coordinates: 37.969°N 48.874°E
- Country: Iran
- Province: Gilan
- County: Talesh
- Bakhsh: Kargan Rud
- Rural District: Lisar

Population (2016)
  - Total: 220
- Time zone: UTC+3:30 (IRST)

Lapaqa Sadeq (Persian: لپاقاصدق, also Romanized as Lapāqā Şadeq) is a village in Lisar Rural District, Kargan Rud District, Talesh County, Gilan Province, Iran.

At the time of the 2006 National Census, the village's population was 193 in 52 households. The following census in 2011 counted 220 people in 64 households. The 2016 census measured the population of the village as 220 people in 71 households.
