= Hellah Dommah =

Hellah Dommah هله دمه
- Village
- Location within Iran
- Coordinates: 38°01′00″N 48°53′00″E
- Country: Iran
- Province: Gilan
- County: Talesh
- Bakhsh: Kargan Rud
- Rural District: Khotbeh Sara

Population (2006)
  - Total: 435
- Time zone: UTC+3:30 (IRST)
  - Summer (DST): UTC+4:30 (IRDT)

Hellah Dommah (Persian: هله دمه) is a village in Khotbeh Sara Rural District, Kargan Rud District, Talesh County, Gilan Province, Iran. At the 2006 census, its population was 435, in 120 families.
