= Chuladeh =

Chuladeh چولاده
- Village
- Country: Iran
- Province: Gilan
- County: Talesh
- Bakhsh: Kargan Rud
- Rural District: Khotbeh Sara

Population (2006)
  - Total: 26
- Time zone: UTC+3:30 (IRST)
  - Summer (DST): UTC+4:30 (IRDT)

Chuladeh (Persian: چولاده, also Romanized as Chūlādeh) is a village in Khotbeh Sara Rural District, Kargan Rud District, Talesh County, Gilan Province, Iran. At the 2006 census, its population was 26, in 7 families.
