= Ahmad Beyg =

Ahmad Beyg احمدبيگ
- Village
- Location within Iran
- Coordinates: 36°45′14″N 46°42′11″E
- Country: Iran
- Province: West Azerbaijan
- County: Shahin Dezh
- Bakhsh: Keshavarz
- Rural District: Chaharduli

Population (2006)
  - Total: 107
- Time zone: UTC+3:30 (IRST)
  - Summer (DST): UTC+4:30 (IRDT)

Ahmad Beyg (Persian: احمدبيگ, also Romanized as Aḩmad Beyg; also known as Aḩmad Beyk) is a village in Chaharduli Rural District, Keshavarz District, Shahin Dezh County, West Azerbaijan Province, Iran. At the 2006 census, its population was 107, in 20 families.
