= Sust, Iran =

Sust سوست
- Village
- Location within Iran
- Coordinates: 37°59′36″N 48°54′05″E
- Country: Iran
- Province: Gilan
- County: Talesh
- Bakhsh: Kargan Rud
- Rural District: Khotbeh Sara

Population (2006)
  - Total: 373
- Time zone: UTC+3:30 (IRST)
  - Summer (DST): UTC+4:30 (IRDT)

Sust (Persian: سوست, also Romanized as Sūst and Sūset) is a village in Khotbeh Sara Rural District, Kargan Rud District, Talesh County, Gilan Province, Iran. At the 2006 census, its population was 373, in 100 families.
