= Qareh Quyunlu =

Qareh Quyunlu or QarAh Quyunlu or Qarah Qowyunlu or Qareh Qowyunlu (Persian: قره قويونلو), also rendered as Qaraquyunlu, may refer to:

- Qareh Quyunlu, Razavi Khorasan
- Qareh Qowyunlu, Shahin Dezh, West Azerbaijan Province
- Qarah Quyunlu, Urmia, West Azerbaijan Province
