= Egoli =

eGoli is the alternative, Zulu name for Johannesburg, South Africa.

Egoli may also refer to:

- Egoli: City of Gold, play by South African playwright Matsemela Manaka
- Egoli: Place of Gold, long-running South African soap opera
- Egoli Air, airline based in Johannesburg, South Africa
- Egoli (album), a 2019 album by Africa Express
- Presbytery of Egoli, Johannesburg, South Africa

== See also ==
- Goli (disambiguation)
