= Lisar Mahalleh =

Lisar Mahalleh ليسارمحله
- Village
- Location within Iran
- Coordinates: 37°58′49″N 48°55′01″E
- Country: Iran
- Province: Gilan
- County: Talesh
- Bakhsh: Kargan Rud
- Rural District: Khotbeh Sara

Population (2006)
  - Total: 1,994
- Time zone: UTC+3:30 (IRST)
  - Summer (DST): UTC+4:30 (IRDT)

Lisar Mahalleh (Persian: ليسارمحله, also Romanized as Līsār Maḩalleh) is a village in Khotbeh Sara Rural District, Kargan Rud District, Talesh County, Gilan Province, Iran. At the 2006 census, its population was 1,994, in 488 families.
