= Tamsheh Lameh =

Tamsheh Lameh تمشه لامه
- Village
- Country: Iran
- Province: Gilan
- County: Talesh
- Bakhsh: Kargan Rud
- Rural District: Khotbeh Sara

Population (2006)
  - Total: 142
- Time zone: UTC+3:30 (IRST)
  - Summer (DST): UTC+4:30 (IRDT)

Tamsheh Lameh (Persian: تمشه لامه, also Romanized as Tamsheh Lāmeh) is a village in Khotbeh Sara Rural District, Kargan Rud District, Talesh County, Gilan Province, Iran. At the 2006 census, its population was 142, in 34 families.
