= Kalamar =

Kalamar كلمر
- Village
- Location within Iran
- Coordinates: 37°58′33″N 48°48′48″E
- Country: Iran
- Province: Gilan
- County: Talesh
- Bakhsh: Kargan Rud
- Rural District: Khotbeh Sara

Population (2006)
  - Total: 44
- Time zone: UTC+3:30 (IRST)
  - Summer (DST): UTC+4:30 (IRDT)

Kalamar (Persian: كلمر, also Romanized as Kalmor) is a village in Khotbeh Sara Rural District, Kargan Rud District, Talesh County, Gilan province, Iran. At the 2006 census, its population was 44, in 9 families.
