= Siah Kat =

Siah Kat سياه كت
- Village
- Interactive map of Siah Kat
- Coordinates: 37.925°N 48.903°E
- Country: Iran
- Province: Gilan
- County: Talesh
- Bakhsh: Kargan Rud
- Rural District: Lisar

Population (2016)
  - Total: 148
- Time zone: UTC+3:30 (IRST)

Siah Kat (Persian: سياه كت, also Romanized as Sīāh Kat) is a village in Lisar Rural District, Kargan Rud District, Talesh County, Gilan Province, Iran.

At the time of the 2006 National Census, the village's population was 143 in 36 households. The following census in 2011 counted 132 people in 38 households. The 2016 census measured the population of the village as 148 people in 51 households.
