= Qaleh Dush =

Qaleh Dush قلعه دوش
- Village
- Location within Iran
- Coordinates: 37°57′34″N 48°53′35″E
- Country: Iran
- Province: Gilan
- County: Talesh
- Bakhsh: Kargan Rud
- Rural District: Lisar

Population (2016)
  - Total: 115
- Time zone: UTC+3:30 (IRST)

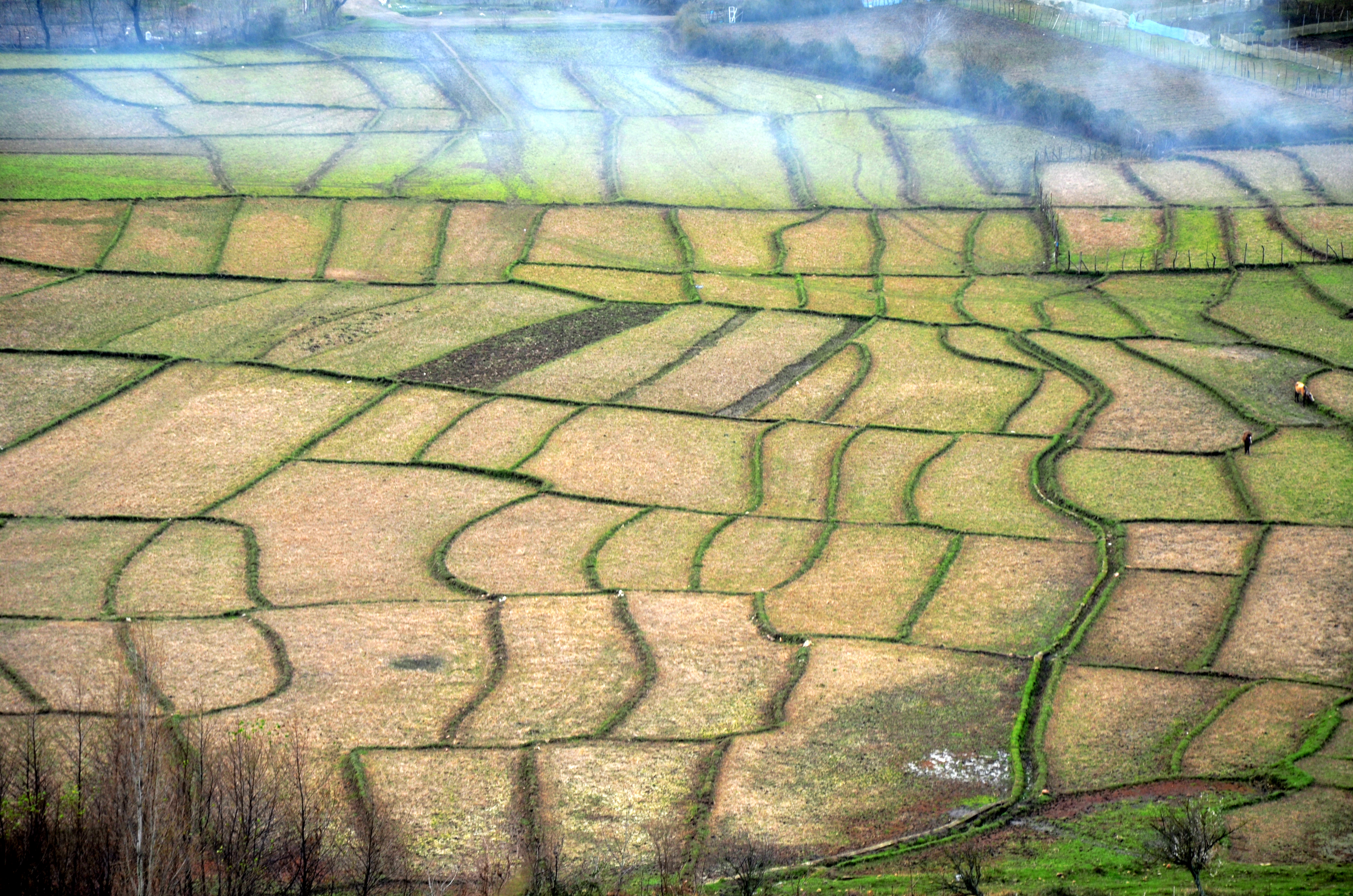
Fields near Qaleh Dush

Qaleh Dush (Persian: قلعه دوش, also Romanized as Qal‘eh Dūsh) is a village in Lisar Rural District, Kargan Rud District, Talesh County, Gilan Province, Iran. At the time of the 2016 census, its population was 115, in 39 families. Decreased from 369 people in 2006.
