= Owbeh Bolaghi =

Owbeh Bolaghi اوبه بلاغي
- Village
- Location within Iran
- Coordinates: 36°48′03″N 46°31′45″E
- Country: Iran
- Province: West Azerbaijan
- County: Shahin Dezh
- Bakhsh: Keshavarz
- Rural District: Chaharduli

Population (2006)
  - Total: 133
- Time zone: UTC+3:30 (IRST)
  - Summer (DST): UTC+4:30 (IRDT)

Owbeh Bolaghi (Persian: اوبه بلاغي, also Romanized as Owbeh Bolāghī; also known as Ūbā Bolāghī) is a village in Chaharduli Rural District, Keshavarz District, Shahin Dezh County, West Azerbaijan Province, Iran. In 2006, its population was 133, in 27 families.
