= Leylakabad =

Leylakabad ليلك اباد
- Village
- Location within Iran
- Coordinates: 36°52′00″N 46°41′00″E
- Country: Iran
- Province: West Azerbaijan
- County: Shahin Dezh
- Bakhsh: Keshavarz
- Rural District: Chaharduli

Population (2006)
  - Total: 106
- Time zone: UTC+3:30 (IRST)
  - Summer (DST): UTC+4:30 (IRDT)

Leylakabad (Persian: ليلك اباد, also Romanized as Leylakābād; also known as Kalaklū) is a village in Chaharduli Rural District, Keshavarz District, Shahin Dezh County, West Azerbaijan Province, Iran. At the 2006 census, its population was 106, in 23 families.
