= Golli =

Golli may refer to:

- Goli, Iran (disambiguation), several villages also spelled as "Golli"
- Golli myelin basic protein (Golli-MBP; or "golli"), an expression of MBP, myelin basic protein
- Ramesh Golli, a sprint kayaker for India at the 2014 Asian Games

== See also ==
- Gollis, Lyngseidet, Lyngen, Troms, Norway; a tourist attraction
- Gollis University, Hargeisa, Somaliland, Somalia
- Goli (disambiguation)
