= Borun-e Bala =

Borun-e Bala برون بالا
- Village
- Location within Iran
- Coordinates: 37°56′34″N 48°46′30″E
- Country: Iran
- Province: Gilan
- County: Talesh
- Bakhsh: Kargan Rud
- Rural District: Lisar

Population (2016)
  - Total: 68
- Time zone: UTC+3:30 (IRST)

Borun-e Bala (Persian: برون بالا, also Romanized as Borūn-e Bālā) is a village in Lisar Rural District, Kargan Rud District, Talesh County, Gilan Province, Iran.

At the time of the 2006 National Census, the village's population was 66 in 12 households. The following census in 2011 counted less than 4 households. The 2016 census measured the population of the village as 68 people in 16 households.
