= Benun =

Benun بنون
- Village
- Location within Iran
- Coordinates: 38°01′04″N 48°48′09″E
- Country: Iran
- Province: Gilan
- County: Talesh
- Bakhsh: Kargan Rud
- Rural District: Lisar

Population (2016)
  - Total: 169
- Time zone: UTC+3:30 (IRST)

Benun (Persian: بنون, also Romanized as Benūn; also known as Benyūn and Benūn-e Mashāyekh) is a village in Lisar Rural District, Kargan Rud District, Talesh County, Gilan Province, Iran.

At the 2006 census, its population was 164, in 32 families. The following census in 2011 reported a permanent population of 0, stating that it is populated from May to October. The 2016 census measured the permanent population of the village as 169 people in 46 households.
