= Siah Jafar =

Siah Jafar سياه جعفر
- Village
- Location within Iran
- Coordinates: 37°57′32″N 48°52′11″E
- Country: Iran
- Province: Gilan
- County: Talesh
- Bakhsh: Kargan Rud
- Rural District: Lisar

Population (2016)
  - Total: 101
- Time zone: UTC+3:30 (IRST)

Siah Jafar (Persian: سياه جعفر, also Romanized as Sīāh Ja‘far) is a village in Lisar Rural District, Kargan Rud District, Talesh County, Gilan Province, Iran.

At the time of the 2006 National Census, the village's population was 198 in 49 households. The following census in 2011 counted 96 people in 27 households. The 2016 census measured the population of the village as 101 people in 34 households.
