= Borun-e Pain =

Borun-e Pain برون پايين
- Village
- Location within Iran
- Coordinates: 37°56′11″N 48°47′07″E
- Country: Iran
- Province: Gilan
- County: Talesh
- Bakhsh: Kargan Rud
- Rural District: Lisar

Population (2011)
  - Total: 22
- Time zone: UTC+3:30 (IRST)

Borun-e Pain (Persian: برون پايين, also Romanized as Borūn-e Pā’īn; also known as Borūn) is a village in Lisar Rural District, Kargan Rud District, Talesh County, Gilan Province, Iran.

At the time of the 2006 National Census, the village's population was 34 in 5 households. The following census in 2011 counted 22 people in 5 households. The 2016 census measured less than 4 households.
