= Kahel =

Kahel (Persian: كهل) may refer to:

- Kahel-e Olya
- Kahel-e Sofla
- Kahel Qeshlaq
