= Qareh Ughlan =

Qareh Ughlan قره اوغلان
- Village
- Location within Iran
- Coordinates: 36°51′39″N 46°38′22″E
- Country: Iran
- Province: West Azerbaijan
- County: Shahin Dezh
- Bakhsh: Keshavarz
- Rural District: Chaharduli

Population (2006)
  - Total: 181
- Time zone: UTC+3:30 (IRST)
  - Summer (DST): UTC+4:30 (IRDT)

Qareh Ughlan (Persian: قره اوغلان, also Romanized as Qareh Ūghlān; also known as Qarah A‘lān) is a village in Chaharduli Rural District, Keshavarz District, Shahin Dezh County, West Azerbaijan Province, Iran. At the 2006 census, its population was 181, in 34 families.
