= Tez Kharab =

Tez Kharab or Tezkharab (Persian: تزخراب) may refer to:

- Tez Kharab, Shahin Dezh
- Tezkharab, Urmia

== See also ==
- Tizkharab (disambiguation)
