= Goli =

Goli may refer to:

== People ==
- Goli Ameri (born 1956), Iranian-American politician, diplomat and businesswoman from the U.S. state of Oregon
- Oliver Dahl-Goli (1897–1976), Norwegian politician for the Christian Democratic Party

== Places ==
- Goli, Solukhumbu, Village Development Committee in Solukhumbu District in the Sagarmatha Zone of north-eastern Nepal
- Goli, Iran (disambiguation), villages in Iran
- Goli otok, island off the northern Adriatic coast in Croatia's Primorje-Gorski Kotar county
- Goli Vrh, Gorenja vas - Poljane, dispersed settlement in the Gorenja vas - Poljane Municipality in the Upper Carniola region of Slovenia
- Shah-goli, large park in Tabriz
- Goli, Uganda, town in Nebbi District, West Nile, northwestern Uganda, close to the border with the Democratic Republic of the Congo
- Goli, Andhra Pradesh, village in Palnadu District, Andhra Pradesh, India
- A shortening of eGoli, the Zulu and Xhosa-language name of Johannesburg, South Africa

== Other ==
- Aakhri Goli, 1977 Bollywood action film directed by Shibu Mitra
- Goli Vada Pav, an ethnic Indian snacks and fast food chain store
- Goli (dance), a traditional Baoulé masquerade
- Grand Orange Lodge of Ireland, fraternal organization and loyal order

== See also ==
- Golis Mountains
- Golis Telecom Somalia
- Golis (disambiguation)
- Golli (disambiguation)
- Egoli (disambiguation), including eGoli
