= Uzan =

Uzan may refer to:

- traveling musicians in Western Asia, see Ashik
- Uzan, Pyrénées-Atlantiques, a village in France
- Uzan (river), in France
- Uzan, Iran, a village in East Azerbaijan Province, Iran
- Uzan-e Olya, a village in West Azerbaijan Province, Iran
- Uzan-e Sofla, a village in West Azerbaijan Province, Iran
- The Dutch abbreviation of the Union of South American Nations (UNASUR)
- Cem Uzan, a Turkish businessman and politician
- A Tunisian Jewish surname:
  - Aharon Uzan, an Israeli politician
  - Ori Uzan, an Israeli footballer
  - Yaakov Uzan, an Israeli musician better known as Kobi Oz
