= Lovachol =

Lovachol لواچال
- Village
- Location within Iran
- Coordinates: 38°00′15″N 48°50′06″E
- Country: Iran
- Province: Gilan
- County: Talesh
- Bakhsh: Kargan Rud
- Rural District: Khotbeh Sara

Population (2006)
  - Total: 339
- Time zone: UTC+3:30 (IRST)
  - Summer (DST): UTC+4:30 (IRDT)

Lovachol (Persian: لواچال, also Romanized as Lovāchol; also known as Lovāchol-e Mashāyekh and Loveh Chāl) is a village in Khotbeh Sara Rural District, Kargan Rud District, Talesh County, Gilan Province, Iran. At the 2006 census, its population was 339, in 90 families.
