= Mahmudabad, Gilan =

Village in Gilan province, Iran

Mahmudabad Persian: محمودآباد
- Village
- Location within Iran
- Coordinates: 37°58′00″N 48°55′36″E
- Country: Iran
- Province: Gilan
- County: Talesh
- District: Kargan Rud
- Rural District: Lisar

Population (2016)
  - Total: 654
- Time zone: UTC+3:30 (IRST)

Mahmudabad (Persian: محمودآباد) (Note: Also romanized as Maḩmūdābād) is a village in Lisar Rural District of Kargan Rud District in Talesh County, Gilan province, Iran.

== Demographics ==
=== Population ===
At the time of the 2006 National Census, the village's population was 620 in 160 households. The following census in 2011 counted 654 people in 194 households. The 2016 census measured the population of the village as 654 people in 213 households.
