= Goli, West Azerbaijan =

Coordinates: 36°55′34″N 46°38′56″E

Goli گلي
- Village
- Interactive map of Goli
- Country: Iran
- Province: West Azerbaijan
- County: Shahin Dezh
- Bakhsh: Keshavarz
- Rural District: Keshavarz

Population (2006)
  - Total: 239
- Time zone: UTC+3:30 (IRST)
  - Summer (DST): UTC+4:30 (IRDT)

Goli (Persian: گلي, also Romanized as Golī) is a village in Keshavarz Rural District, Keshavarz District, Shahin Dezh County, West Azerbaijan Province, Iran. At the 2006 census, its population was 239, in 47 families.
