= Uzan-e Olya =

Uzan-e Olya اوزان عليا
- Village
- Location within Iran
- Coordinates: 36°54′22″N 46°40′52″E
- Country: Iran
- Province: West Azerbaijan
- County: Shahin Dezh
- Bakhsh: Keshavarz
- Rural District: Chaharduli

Population (2006)
  - Total: 48
- Time zone: UTC+3:30 (IRST)
  - Summer (DST): UTC+4:30 (IRDT)

Uzan-e Olya (Persian: اوزان عليا, also Romanized as Ūzān-e ‘Olyā; also known as Owzān-e Bālā, Ūzān, and Ūzān-e Bālā) is a village in Chaharduli Rural District, Keshavarz District, Shahin Dezh County, West Azerbaijan Province, Iran. At the 2006 census, its population was 48, in 10 families.
