= Ashik Aghasi =

Village in Gilan province, Iran

Ashik Aghasi Persian: اشيك اغاسي
- Village
- Location within Iran
- Coordinates: 38°01′28″N 48°52′59″E
- Country: Iran
- Province: Gilan
- County: Talesh
- District: Kargan Rud
- Rural District: Khotbeh Sara

Population (2016)
  - Total: 569
- Time zone: UTC+3:30 (IRST)

Ashik Aghasi (Persian: اشيك اغاسي) (Note: Also romanized as Āshīk Āghāsī) is a village in Khotbeh Sara Rural District of Kargan Rud District in Talesh County, Gilan province, Iran.

== Demographics ==
=== Population ===
At the time of the 2006 National Census, the village's population was 1,181 in 325 households. The following census in 2011 counted 617 people in 190 households. The 2016 census measured the population of the village as 569 people in 177 households.
