= Pareh-ye Sofla =

Pareh-ye Sofla پاره سفلي
- Village
- Location within Iran
- Coordinates: 36°51′57″N 46°18′08″E
- Country: Iran
- Province: West Azerbaijan
- County: Shahin Dezh
- Bakhsh: Keshavarz
- Rural District: Keshavarz

Population (2006)
  - Total: 93
- Time zone: UTC+3:30 (IRST)
  - Summer (DST): UTC+4:30 (IRDT)

Pareh-ye Sofla (Persian: پاره سفلي, also Romanized as Pāreh-ye Soflá) is a village in Keshavarz Rural District, Keshavarz District, Shahin Dezh County, West Azerbaijan Province, Iran. At the 2006 census, its population was 93, in 26 families.
