= Qatur, Shahin Dezh =

Village in West Azerbaijan province, Iran

Qatur Persian: قطور
- Village
- Location within Iran
- Coordinates: 36°51′29″N 46°32′36″E
- Country: Iran
- Province: West Azerbaijan
- County: Shahin Dezh
- District: Keshavarz
- Rural District: Chaharduli

Population (2016)
  - Total: 627
- Time zone: UTC+3:30 (IRST)

Qatur (Persian: قطور) (Note: Also romanized as Qaţūr) is a village in Chaharduli Rural District of Keshavarz District in Shahin Dezh County, West Azerbaijan province, Iran.

== Demographics ==
=== Population ===
At the time of the 2006 National Census, the village's population was 642 in 125 households. The following census in 2011 counted 691 people in 178 households. The 2016 census measured the population of the village as 627 people in 138 households.
