= Kahul =

Kahul may refer to:

- Cahul, Moldova
- Kahul, Iran
- Kahul-e Bala, Iran
- Kahul-e Pain, Iran
- Lake Kahul, Ukraine
