= Najjar, West Azerbaijan =

Village in West Azerbaijan province, Iran

Najjar Persian: نجار
- Village
- Location within Iran
- Coordinates: 36°50′37″N 46°20′37″E
- Country: Iran
- Province: West Azerbaijan
- County: Shahin Dezh
- District: Keshavarz
- Rural District: Keshavarz

Population (2016)
  - Total: 778
- Time zone: UTC+3:30 (IRST)

Najjar (Persian: نجار) (Note: Also romanized as Najjār) is a village in Keshavarz Rural District of Keshavarz District in Shahin Dezh County, West Azerbaijan province, Iran.

== Demographics ==
=== Population ===
At the time of the 2006 National Census, the village's population was 801 in 202 households. The following census in 2011 counted 802 people in 221 households. The 2016 census measured the population of the village as 778 people in 240 households.
