= Chaplujeh =

Village in West Azerbaijan province, Iran

Chaplujeh Persian: چپلوجه
- Village
- Location within Iran
- Coordinates: 36°52′38″N 46°24′10″E
- Country: Iran
- Province: West Azerbaijan
- County: Shahin Dezh
- District: Keshavarz
- Rural District: Keshavarz

Population (2016)
  - Total: 654
- Time zone: UTC+3:30 (IRST)

Chaplujeh (Persian: چپلوجه) (Note: Also romanized as Chaplūjeh) is a village in Keshavarz Rural District of Keshavarz District in Shahin Dezh County, West Azerbaijan province, Iran.

== Demographics ==
=== Population ===
At the time of the 2006 National Census, the village's population was 739 in 159 households. The following census in 2011 counted 685 people in 187 households. The 2016 census measured the population of the village as 654 people in 211 households.
