= Razmi =

Razmi may refer to:

- Razmi, Iran
- Anahita Razmi (born 1981), German-born visual artist, of Iranian-German descent
- Jahangir Razmi (born 1947), Iranian photojournalist and photographer
