= Aghcheh Masjed =

Village in West Azerbaijan province, Iran

Aghcheh Masjed Persian: اغچه مسجد
- Village
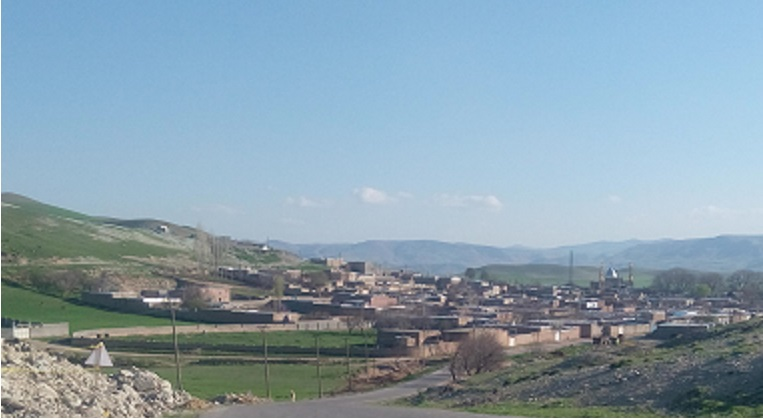
- The village of Aghcheh Masjed

- Location within Iran
- Coordinates: 36°48′21″N 46°28′30″E
- Country: Iran
- Province: West Azerbaijan
- County: Shahin Dezh
- District: Keshavarz
- Rural District: Keshavarz

Population (2016)
  - Total: 672
- Time zone: UTC+3:30 (IRST)

Aghcheh Masjed (Persian: اغچه مسجد) (Note: Also romanized as Āghcheh Masjed) is a village in Keshavarz Rural District of Keshavarz District in Shahin Dezh County, West Azerbaijan province, Iran.

== Demographics ==
=== Population ===
At the time of the 2006 National Census, the village's population was 788 in 190 households. The following census in 2011 counted 723 people in 211 households. The 2016 census measured the population of the village as 672 people in 228 households.
