= Pareh-ye Olya =

Pareh-ye Olya پاره عليا
- Village
- Location within Iran
- Coordinates: 36°51′33″N 46°19′20″E
- Country: Iran
- Province: West Azerbaijan
- County: Shahin Dezh
- Bakhsh: Keshavarz
- Rural District: Keshavarz

Population (2006)
  - Total: 60
- Time zone: UTC+3:30 (IRST)
  - Summer (DST): UTC+4:30 (IRDT)

Pareh-ye Olya (Persian: پاره عليا, also Romanized as Pāreh-ye ‘Olyā) is a village in Keshavarz Rural District, Keshavarz District, Shahin Dezh County, West Azerbaijan Province, Iran. At the 2006 census, its population was 60, in 17 families.
