= Seyyed Lar, Gilan =

Village in Gilan province, Iran

Seyyed Lar Persian: سيدلر
- Village
- Location within Iran
- Coordinates: 37°57′14″N 48°55′25″E
- Country: Iran
- Province: Gilan
- County: Talesh
- District: Kargan Rud
- Rural District: Lisar

Population (2016)
  - Total: 614
- Time zone: UTC+3:30 (IRST)

Seyyed Lar (Persian: سيدلر) is a village in Lisar Rural District of Kargan Rud District in Talesh County, Gilan province, Iran.

== Demographics ==
=== Population ===
At the time of the 2006 National Census, the village's population was 705 in 158 households. The following census in 2011 counted 610 people in 165 households. The 2016 census measured the population of the village as 614 people in 196 households.
