= Lisar Castle =

Castle in Gilan Province, Iran

Lisar castle
- قلعه لیسار
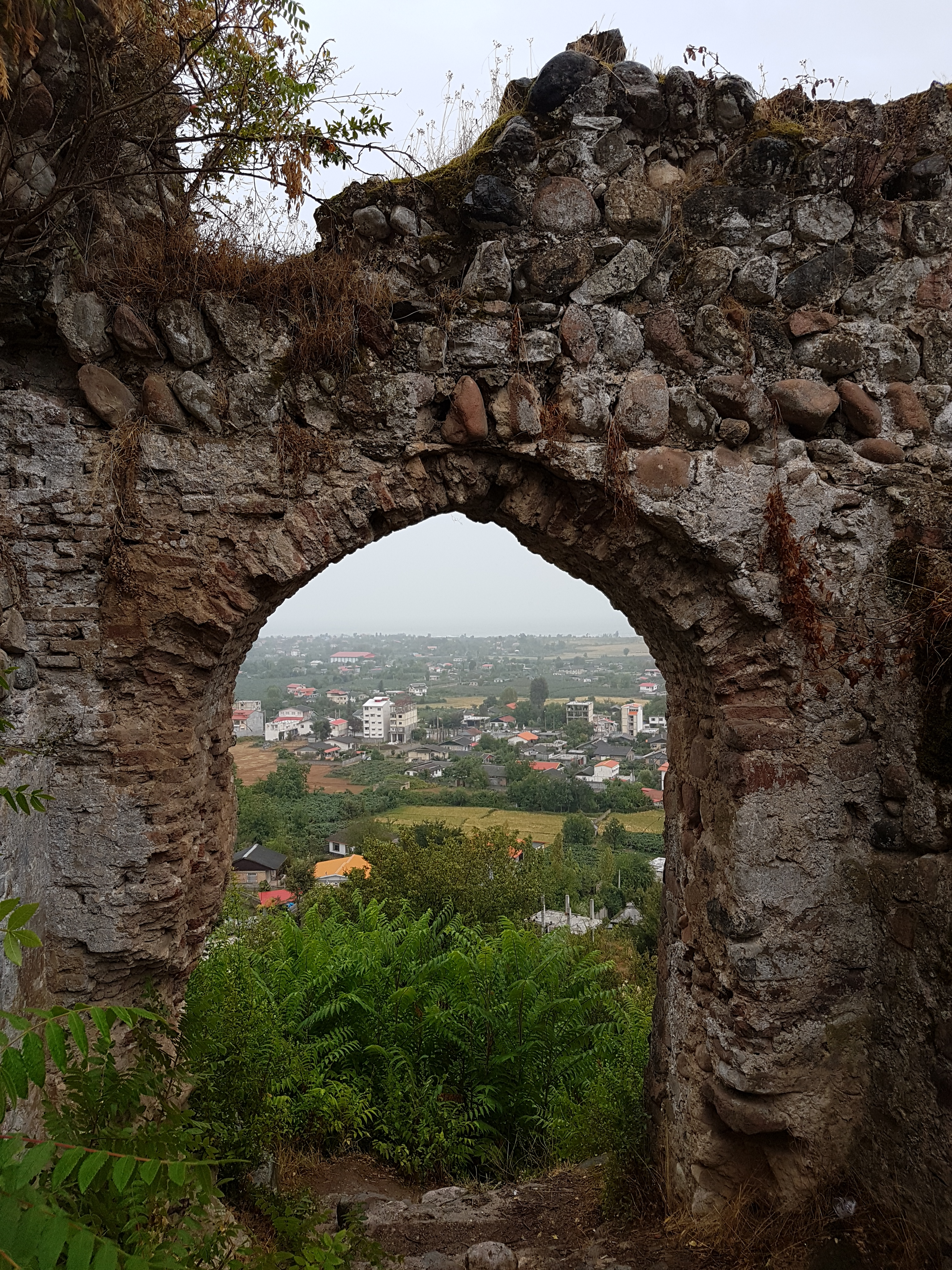

General information
- Type: Castle
- Location: Lisar, Iran

Lisar castle (Persian: قلعه لیسار) is a historical castle located in Talesh County in Gilan Province, The longevity of this fortress dates back to the Seljuk Empire.

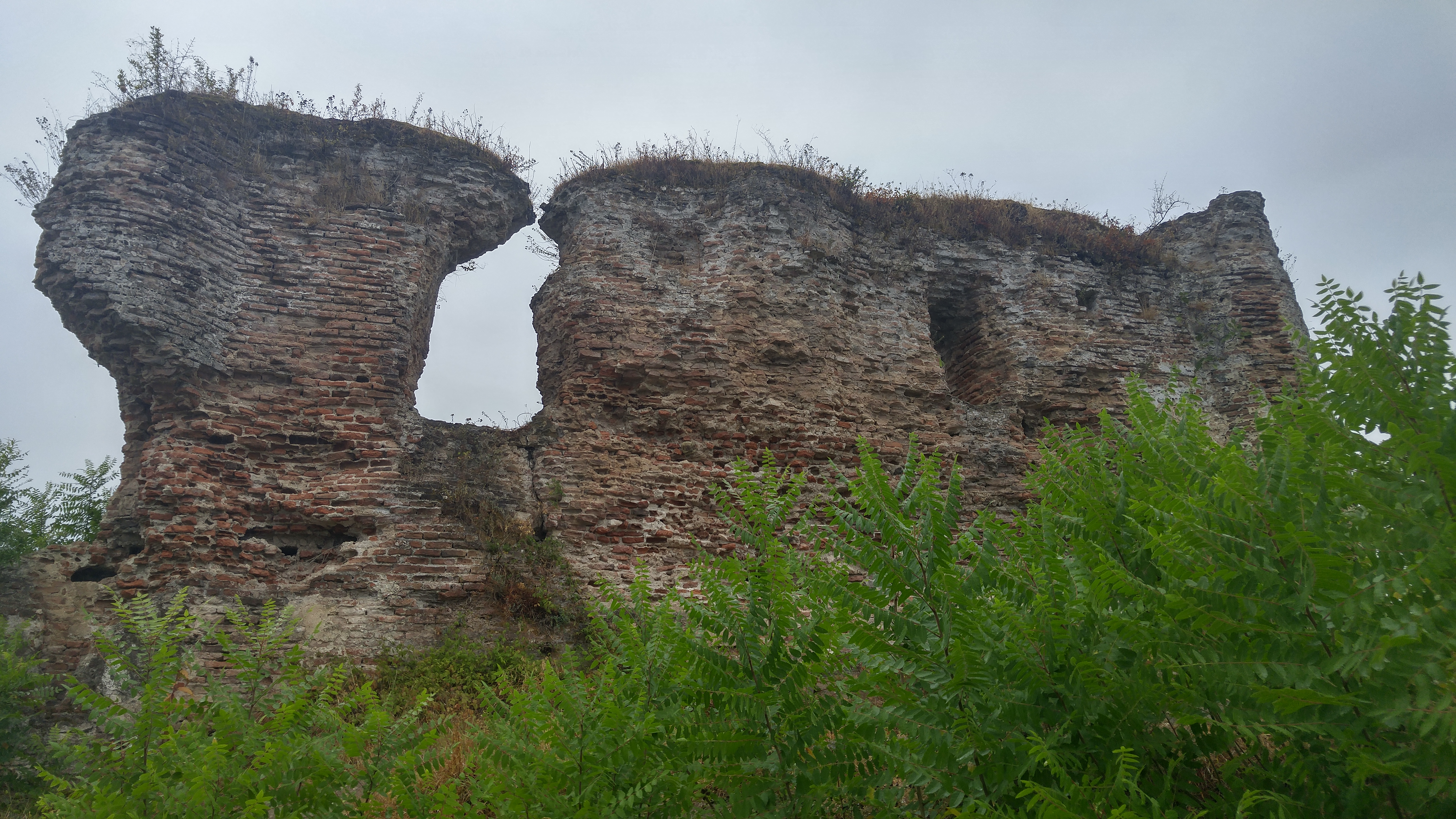
