= Ahmadabad, Shahin Dezh =

Village in West Azerbaijan province, Iran

Ahmadabad Persian: احمداباد
- Village
- Location within Iran
- Coordinates: 36°46′50″N 46°26′23″E
- Country: Iran
- Province: West Azerbaijan
- County: Shahin Dezh
- District: Keshavarz
- Rural District: Keshavarz

Population (2016)
  - Total: 1,639
- Time zone: UTC+3:30 (IRST)

Ahmadabad (Persian: احمداباد) (Note: Also romanized as Aḩmadābād) is a village in Keshavarz Rural District of Keshavarz District in Shahin Dezh County, West Azerbaijan province, Iran.

== Demographics ==
=== Population ===
At the time of the 2006 National Census, the village's population was 1,717 in 405 households. The following census in 2011 counted 1,772 people in 520 households. The 2016 census measured the population of the village as 1,639 people in 504 households. It was the most populous village in its rural district.
