= Keshli =

Village in Gilan province, Iran

Keshli Persian: كشلی
- Village
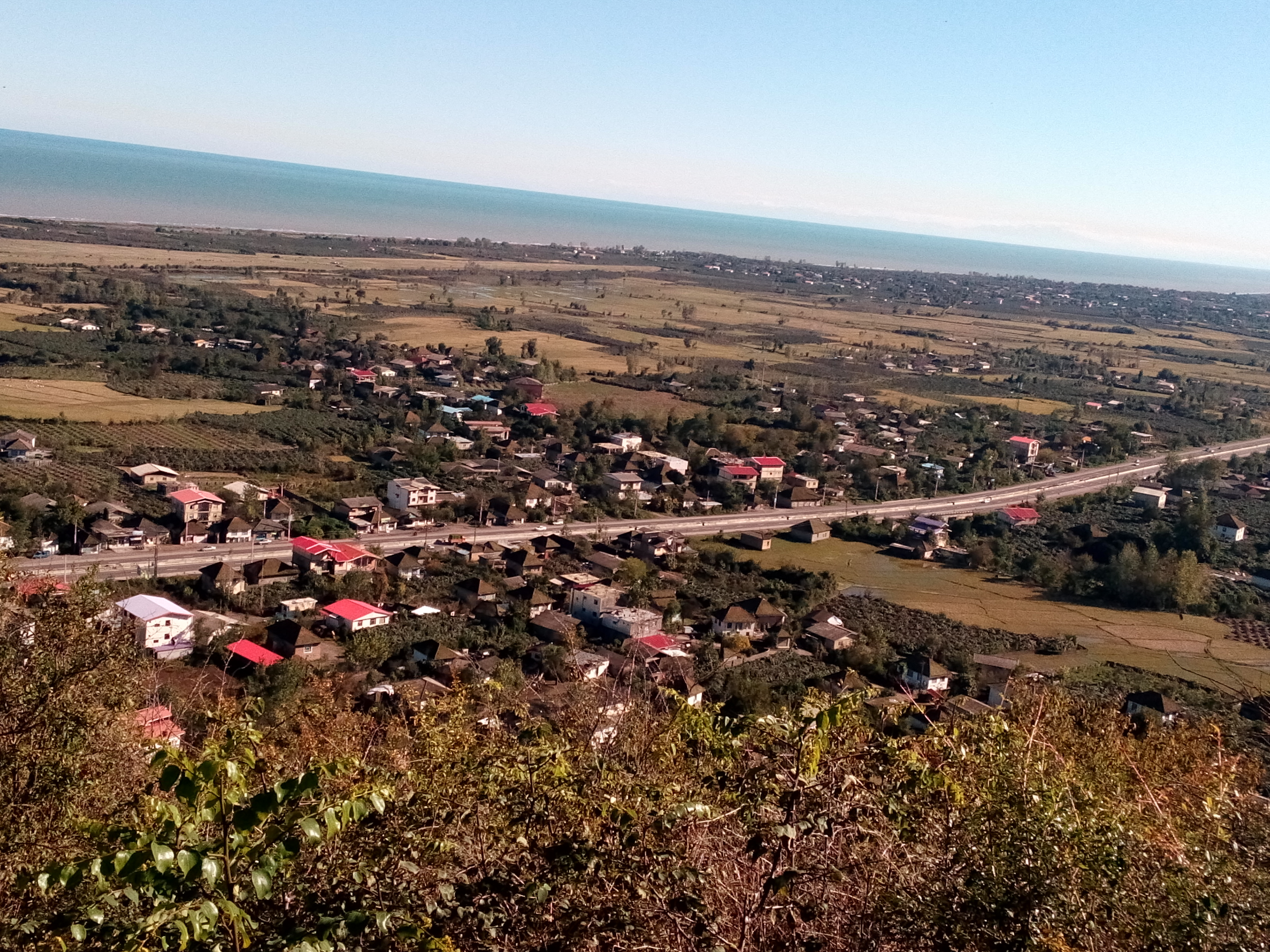
- Keshli in autumn

- Location within Iran
- Coordinates: 38°04′02″N 48°53′37″E
- Country: Iran
- Province: Gilan
- County: Talesh
- District: Kargan Rud
- Rural District: Khotbeh Sara

Population (2016)
  - Total: 2,920
- Time zone: UTC+3:30 (IRST)

Keshli (Persian: كشلی) (Note: Also romanized as Keshlī) is a village in Khotbeh Sara Rural District of Kargan Rud District in Talesh County, Gilan province, Iran.

== Demographics ==
=== Population ===
At the time of the 2006 National Census, the village's population was 2,784 in 719 households. The following census in 2011 counted 3,081 people in 831 households. The 2016 census measured the population of the village as 2,920 people in 884 households. It was the most populous village in its rural district.

== See also ==
Media related to Keshli at Wikimedia Commons
