= Qanbar Mahalleh =

Qanbar Mahalleh (Persian: قنبرمحله) may refer to:

- Qanbar Mahalleh, Astara
- Qanbar Mahalleh, Talesh
- Qanbar Mahalleh, Kargan Rud, Talesh County
