= Li Sara =

Village in Gilan province, Iran

Li Sara Persian: ليسارا
- Village
- Location within Iran
- Coordinates: 38°02′45″N 48°50′46″E
- Country: Iran
- Province: Gilan
- County: Talesh
- District: Kargan Rud
- Rural District: Khotbeh Sara

Population (2016)
  - Total: 980
- Time zone: UTC+3:30 (IRST)

Li Sara (Persian: ليسارا) (Note: Also romanized as Lī Sarā, Lisara, and Līsarā; also known as Līsārā Maḩalleh) is a village in Khotbeh Sara Rural District of Kargan Rud District in Talesh County, Gilan province, Iran.

== Demographics ==
=== Population ===
At the time of the 2006 National Census, the village's population was 1,462 in 337 households. The following census in 2011 counted 1,417 people in 390 households. The 2016 census measured the population of the village as 980 people in 319 households.
