= Uzan-e Sofla =

Uzan-e Sofla اوزان سفلي
- Village
- Location within Iran
- Coordinates: 36°54′25″N 46°37′22″E
- Country: Iran
- Province: West Azerbaijan
- County: Shahin Dezh
- Bakhsh: Keshavarz
- Rural District: Chaharduli

Population (2006)
  - Total: 139
- Time zone: UTC+3:30 (IRST)
  - Summer (DST): UTC+4:30 (IRDT)

Uzan-e Sofla (Persian: اوزان سفلي, also Romanized as Ūzān-e Soflá; also known as Owzān-e Pā‘īn) is a village in Chaharduli Rural District, Keshavarz District, Shahin Dezh County, West Azerbaijan Province, Iran. At the 2006 census, its population was 139, in 29 families.
