= Zormi =

Zormi زرمی
- Village
- Location within Iran
- Coordinates: 37°58′45″N 48°51′30″E
- Country: Iran
- Province: Gilan
- County: Talesh
- Bakhsh: Kargan Rud
- Rural District: Lisar

Population (2016)
  - Total: 73
- Time zone: UTC+3:30 (IRST)

Zormi (Persian: زرمی, also Romanized as Zormī and Zaramī; also known as Razmī) is a village in Lisar Rural District, Kargan Rud District, Talesh County, Gilan Province, Iran.

At the time of the 2006 National Census, the village's population was 78 in 17 households. The following census in 2011 counted 53 people in 15 households. The 2016 census measured the population of the village as 73 people in 25 households.
