= Reza Qeshlaq =

Village in West Azerbaijan province, Iran

Reza Qeshlaq Persian: رضاقشلاق
- Village
- Location within Iran
- Coordinates: 36°47′47″N 46°37′00″E
- Country: Iran
- Province: West Azerbaijan
- County: Shahin Dezh
- District: Keshavarz
- Rural District: Chaharduli

Population (2016)
  - Total: 150
- Time zone: UTC+3:30 (IRST)

Reza Qeshlaq (Persian: رضاقشلاق) (Note: Also romanized as Reẕā Qeshlāq; also known as Reẕā Qeshlāqī) is a village in Chaharduli Rural District of Keshavarz District in Shahin Dezh County, West Azerbaijan province, Iran.

== Demographics ==
=== Population ===
At the time of the 2006 National Census, the village's population was 162 in 43 households. The following census in 2011 counted 144 people in 44 households. The 2016 census measured the population of the village as 150 people in 46 households.
