= Bura Sara =

Village in Gilan province, Iran

Bura Sara Persian: بوراسرا
- Village
- Location within Iran
- Coordinates: 38°00′37″N 48°54′17″E
- Country: Iran
- Province: Gilan
- County: Talesh
- District: Kargan Rud
- Rural District: Khotbeh Sara

Population (2016)
  - Total: 753
- Time zone: UTC+3:30 (IRST)

Bura Sara (Persian: بوراسرا) (Note: Also romanized as Būrā Sarā; also known as Booneh Sara, Būr Sarā, Bura Sarāi, Būrah Sarā, and Maḩalleh-ye Būrsarā) is a village in Khotbeh Sara Rural District of Kargan Rud District in Talesh County, Gilan province, Iran.

== Demographics ==
=== Population ===
At the time of the 2006 National Census, the village's population was 772 in 180 households. The following census in 2011 counted 702 people in 214 households. The 2016 census measured the population of the village as 753 people in 247 households.
