= Chapu =

Chapu may refer to:

== Geography ==
- Chapu, Iran, a village in West Azerbaijan Province, Iran
- Zhapu, formerly romanized as Chapu, a seaport in China

== People ==
- Henri Chapu (1833–1891), French sculptor
- Andrés Nocioni (born 1979), Philadelphia 76ers forward nicknamed "Chapu"
- Chapu (entertainer), stage name of Chilean entertainer Francisco Javier Puelles Gana (born 1984)
- Amisha Patel (born 1978), Hotelier, nicknamed “Chapu Doctor”

== Other uses ==
- Chapo (beverage), Peruvian beverage made from boiled plantain with cinnamon and clove
- Battle of Chapu, fought between British and Chinese forces in Chapu (Zhapu), China, in 1842 during the First Opium War
