= Khvajeh Kari =

Village in Gilan province, Iran

Khvajeh Kari Persian: خواجه كري
- Village
- Location within Iran
- Coordinates: 38°01′50″N 48°54′37″E
- Country: Iran
- Province: Gilan
- County: Talesh
- District: Kargan Rud
- Rural District: Khotbeh Sara

Population (2016)
  - Total: 721
- Time zone: UTC+3:30 (IRST)

Khvajeh Kari (Persian: خواجه كري) (Note: Also romanized as Khvājeh Karī) is a village in Khotbeh Sara Rural District of Kargan Rud District in Talesh County, Gilan province, Iran.

== Demographics ==
=== Population ===
At the time of the 2006 National Census, the village's population was 631 in 177 households. The following census in 2011 counted 727 people in 237 households. The 2016 census measured the population of the village as 721 people in 229 households.
