= Qaleh Bin =

Qaleh Bin or Qaleh Beyn (Persian: قلعه بين) may refer to:

- Qaleh Bin, Ardabil
- Qaleh Bin, Talesh, Gilan Province
- Qaleh Bin, Kargan Rud, Talesh County, Gilan Province
