= Alichin =

Village in West Azerbaijan province, Iran

Alichin Persian: الي چين
- Village
- Location within Iran
- Coordinates: 36°50′09″N 46°31′20″E
- Country: Iran
- Province: West Azerbaijan
- County: Shahin Dezh
- District: Keshavarz
- Rural District: Chaharduli

Population (2016)
  - Total: 232
- Time zone: UTC+3:30 (IRST)

Alichin (Persian: الي چين) (Note: Also romanized as Ālī Chīn and ‘Ālīchīn)) is a village in Chaharduli Rural District of Keshavarz District in Shahin Dezh County, West Azerbaijan province, Iran.

== Demographics ==
=== Population ===
At the time of the 2006 National Census, the village's population was 389 in 88 households. The following census in 2011 counted 305 people in 83 households. The 2016 census measured the population of the village as 232 people in 78 households.
