= Golis =

Golis may refer to:

- Golis Mountains, Togdheer, Somaliland; a mountain range
- Golis Telecom Somalia, a telecom operator in Puntland, Somalia

== See also ==
- Gollis University, Hargeisa, Somaliland, Somalia
- Gollis, Lyngseidet, Lyngen, Troms, Norway; a tourist attraction
- Goli (disambiguation)
