= Qarah Qayeh, Shahin Dezh =

Village in West Azerbaijan province, Iran

Qarah Qayeh Persian: قره قيه
- Village
- Location within Iran
- Coordinates: 36°45′46″N 46°41′34″E
- Country: Iran
- Province: West Azerbaijan
- County: Shahin Dezh
- District: Keshavarz
- Rural District: Chaharduli

Population (2016)
  - Total: 427
- Time zone: UTC+3:30 (IRST)

Qarah Qayeh (Persian: قره قيه) (Note: Also romanized as Qareh Qīyeh) is a village in Chaharduli Rural District of Keshavarz District in Shahin Dezh County, West Azerbaijan province, Iran.

== Demographics ==
=== Population ===
At the time of the 2006 National Census, the village's population was 465 in 93 households. The following census in 2011 counted 427 people in 102 households. The 2016 census measured the population of the village as 427 people in 112 households.
