= Qaban Kandi =

Village in West Azerbaijan province, Iran

Qaban Kandi Persian: قبان كندي
- Village
- Location within Iran
- Coordinates: 36°51′55″N 46°24′08″E
- Country: Iran
- Province: West Azerbaijan
- County: Shahin Dezh
- District: Keshavarz
- Rural District: Keshavarz

Population (2016)
  - Total: 606
- Time zone: UTC+3:30 (IRST)

Qaban Kandi (Persian: قبان كندي) (Note: Also romanized as Qabān Kandī) is a village in Keshavarz Rural District of Keshavarz District in Shahin Dezh County, West Azerbaijan province, Iran.

== Demographics ==
=== Population ===
At the time of the 2006 National Census, the village's population was 835 in 181 households. The following census in 2011 counted 614 people in 162 households. The 2016 census measured the population of the village as 606 people in 183 households.
