= Aqbal =

Village in West Azerbaijan province, Iran

Aqbal Persian: اقبال
- Village
- Location within Iran
- Coordinates: 36°52′51″N 46°20′51″E
- Country: Iran
- Province: West Azerbaijan
- County: Shahin Dezh
- District: Keshavarz
- Rural District: Keshavarz

Population (2016)
  - Total: 793
- Time zone: UTC+3:30 (IRST)

Aqbal (Persian: اقبال) (Note: Also romanized as Āqbāl, Eqbāl, and Iqbāl) is a village in Keshavarz Rural District of Keshavarz District in Shahin Dezh County, West Azerbaijan province, Iran.

== Demographics ==
=== Population ===
At the time of the 2006 National Census, the village's population was 713 in 157 households. The following census in 2011 counted 741 people in 188 households. The 2016 census measured the population of the village as 793 people in 233 households.
