= Alaguz =

Village in West Azerbaijan province, Iran

Alaguz Persian: الاگوز
- Village
- Location within Iran
- Coordinates: 36°50′27″N 46°37′21″E
- Country: Iran
- Province: West Azerbaijan
- County: Shahin Dezh
- District: Keshavarz
- Rural District: Chaharduli

Population (2016)
  - Total: 262
- Time zone: UTC+3:30 (IRST)

Alaguz (Persian: الاگوز) (Note: Also romanized as Ālāgūz) is a village in Chaharduli Rural District of Keshavarz District in Shahin Dezh County, West Azerbaijan province, Iran.

== Demographics ==
=== Population ===
At the time of the 2006 National Census, the village's population was 276 in 54 households. The following census in 2011 counted 270 people in 64 households. The 2016 census measured the population of the village as 262 people in 76 households.
