= Zaher Kandi =

Village in West Azerbaijan province, Iran

Zaher Kandi Persian: ظاهركندي
- Village
- Location within Iran
- Coordinates: 36°49′21″N 46°38′24″E
- Country: Iran
- Province: West Azerbaijan
- County: Shahin Dezh
- District: Keshavarz
- Rural District: Chaharduli

Population (2016)
  - Total: 664
- Time zone: UTC+3:30 (IRST)

Zaher Kandi (Persian: ظاهركندي) (Note: Also romanized as Z̧āher Kandī) is a village in Chaharduli Rural District of Keshavarz District in Shahin Dezh County, West Azerbaijan province, Iran.

== Demographics ==
=== Population ===
At the time of the 2006 National Census, the village's population was 703 in 138 households. The following census in 2011 counted 661 people in 182 households. The 2016 census measured the population of the village as 664 people in 192 households. It was the most populous village in its rural district.
