= Guli, West Azerbaijan =

Guli گولي
- Village
- Location within Iran
- Coordinates: 36°55′37″N 46°38′54″E
- Country: Iran
- Province: West Azerbaijan
- County: Shahin Dezh
- Bakhsh: Keshavarz
- Rural District: Chaharduli

Population (2006)
  - Total: 34
- Time zone: UTC+3:30 (IRST)
  - Summer (DST): UTC+4:30 (IRDT)

Guli (Persian: گولي, also Romanized as Gūlī; also known as Golī and Kūlī) is a village in Chaharduli Rural District, Keshavarz District, Shahin Dezh County, West Azerbaijan Province, Iran. At the 2006 census, its population was 34, in 7 families.
