= Cahul (disambiguation) =

Cahul may refer to:

- Cahul, a city and municipality in southern Moldova
- Cahul District, a district in southern Moldova
- Cahul County (Moldova), a former county in Moldova
- Cahul County (Romania), a county in Romania
- Cahul (wine), a wine region in Moldova
- Cahul International Airport, an airport in Moldova, near Cahul
- Cahul Lake, a lake in Moldova and Ukraine
- Cahul River, a river in Moldova and Ukraine

== See also ==
- Kahul (disambiguation)
