= Sevarin =

Village in West Azerbaijan province, Iran

Sevarin Persian: صورين
- Village
- Location within Iran
- Coordinates: 36°49′30″N 46°35′15″E
- Country: Iran
- Province: West Azerbaijan
- County: Shahin Dezh
- District: Keshavarz
- Rural District: Chaharduli

Population (2016)
  - Total: 549
- Time zone: UTC+3:30 (IRST)

Sevarin (Persian: صورين) (Note: Also romanized as Şevarīn; also known as Şūrī and Sūry) is a village in, and the capital of, Chaharduli Rural District in Keshavarz District of Shahin Dezh County, West Azerbaijan province, Iran.

== Demographics ==
=== Population ===
At the time of the 2006 National Census, the village's population was 657 in 146 households. The following census in 2011 counted 635 people in 179 households. The 2016 census measured the population of the village as 549 people in 174 households.
