= Khalvat =

Village in West Azerbaijan province, Iran

Khalvat Persian: خلوت
- Village
- Location within Iran
- Coordinates: 36°50′45″N 46°22′30″E
- Country: Iran
- Province: West Azerbaijan
- County: Shahin Dezh
- District: Keshavarz
- Rural District: Keshavarz

Population (2016)
  - Total: 625
- Time zone: UTC+3:30 (IRST)

Khalvat (Persian: خلوت) is a village in Keshavarz Rural District of Keshavarz District in Shahin Dezh County, West Azerbaijan province, Iran.

== Demographics ==
=== Population ===
At the time of the 2006 National Census, the village's population was 703 in 162 households. The following census in 2011 counted 691 people in 196 households. The 2016 census measured the population of the village as 625 people in 192 households.
