= Qazanlu =

Village in West Azerbaijan province, Iran

Qazanlu Persian: قازان لو
- Village
- Location within Iran
- Coordinates: 36°47′37″N 46°23′04″E
- Country: Iran
- Province: West Azerbaijan
- County: Shahin Dezh
- District: Keshavarz
- Rural District: Keshavarz

Population (2016)
  - Total: 864
- Time zone: UTC+3:30 (IRST)

Qazanlu (Persian: قازان لو) (Note: Also romanized as Qāzānlū) is a village in Keshavarz Rural District of Keshavarz District in Shahin Dezh County, West Azerbaijan province, Iran.

== Demographics ==
=== Population ===
At the time of the 2006 National Census, the village's population was 848 in 177 households. The following census in 2011 counted 844 people in 202 households. The 2016 census measured the population of the village as 864 people in 240 households.
