= Owtar, Kargan Rud =

Village in Gilan province, Iran

Owtar Persian: اوتار
- Village
- Location within Iran
- Coordinates: 37°57′35″N 48°55′40″E
- Country: Iran
- Province: Gilan
- County: Talesh
- District: Kargan Rud
- Rural District: Lisar

Population (2016)
  - Total: 828
- Time zone: UTC+3:30 (IRST)

Owtar (Persian: اوتار) (Note: Also romanized as Autar and Owtār) is a village in Lisar Rural District of Kargan Rud District in Talesh County, Gilan province, Iran.

== Demographics ==
=== Population ===
At the time of the 2006 National Census, the village's population was 781 in 192 households. The following census in 2011 counted 993 people in 270 households. The 2016 census measured the population of the village as 828 people in 293 households.
