= Chupan Mahalleh =

Village in Gilan province, Iran

Chupan Mahalleh Persian: چوپان محله
- Village
- Location within Iran
- Coordinates: 38°02′38″N 48°54′29″E
- Country: Iran
- Province: Gilan
- County: Talesh
- District: Kargan Rud
- Rural District: Khotbeh Sara

Population (2016)
  - Total: 928
- Time zone: UTC+3:30 (IRST)

Chupan Mahalleh (Persian: چوپان محله) (Note: Also romanized as Chūpān Maḩalleh) is a village in Khotbeh Sara Rural District of Kargan Rud District in Talesh County, Gilan province, Iran.

== Demographics ==
=== Population ===
At the time of the 2006 National Census, the village's population was 849 in 230 households. The following census in 2011 counted 936 people in 267 households. The 2016 census measured the population of the village as 928 people in 284 households.
