= Khotbeh Sara =

Village in Gilan province, Iran

Khotbeh Sara Persian: خطبه سرا
- Village
- Location within Iran
- Coordinates: 38°03′44″N 48°53′38″E
- Country: Iran
- Province: Gilan
- County: Talesh
- District: Kargan Rud
- Rural District: Khotbeh Sara

Population (2016)
  - Total: 651
- Time zone: UTC+3:30 (IRST)

Khotbeh Sara (Persian: خطبه سرا) (Note: Also romanized as Khoţbeh Sarā; also known as Hata Basrah and Seydgāh-e Khoţbeh Sarā) is a village in, and the capital of, Khotbeh Sara Rural District in Kargan Rud District of Talesh County, Gilan province, Iran.

== Demographics ==
=== Population ===
At the time of the 2006 National Census, the village's population was 273 in 67 households. The following census in 2011 counted 416 people in 125 households. The 2016 census measured the population of the village as 651 people in 215 households.
