= Davan =

Davan may refer to:

== People ==
- Davan Maharaj, Trinidadian journalist

== Places ==
- Davan, Fars, Iran
- Davan, Gilan, Iran
- Davan, Hamadan, Iran
- Loch Davan, United Kingdom

== Fictional characters ==
- Davan Shakari
- Davan (Star Wars)
- Powerhouse (Rieg Davan)

== See also ==
- Dawan (disambiguation)
