= Agari Bujaq, Gilan =

Village in Gilan province, Iran

Agari Bujaq Persian: اگری بوجاق
- Village
- Location within Iran
- Coordinates: 37°58′18″N 48°53′18″E
- Country: Iran
- Province: Gilan
- County: Talesh
- District: Kargan Rud
- Rural District: Lisar

Population (2016)
  - Total: 492
- Time zone: UTC+3:30 (IRST)

Agari Bujaq (Persian: اگری بوجاق) (Note: Also romanized as Agarī Būjāq; also known as Agrī Bījār, Egrī Būjāq, and Qanbar Maḩalleh) is a village in Lisar Rural District of Kargan Rud District in Talesh County, Gilan province, Iran.

== Demographics ==
=== Population ===
At the time of the 2006 National Census, the village's population was 318 in 73 households. The following census in 2011 counted 438 people in 121 households. The 2016 census measured the population of the village as 492 people in 151 households.
