= Amatola Presbytery =

Presbytery in South Africa

The Presbytery of Amathole or Amatola is a presbytery of the Uniting Presbyterian Church in Southern Africa, based in Eastern Cape, South Africa. It stretches from Queenstown and Bedford through to East London and includes Alice and Stutterheim.

== Congregations ==
- Adelaide Town Presbyterian Church
- Adelaide Township Presbyterian Church
- Alice Town Presbyterian Church
- Auld Memorial Presbyterian Church
- Burnshill Presbyterian Church
- C Koti Memorial Presbyterian Church
- Cambridge Presbyterian Church
- Davidson Memorial Presbyterian Church
- Dorrington Presbyterian Church
- Dr Ntsikelelo Katiya Memorial Presbyterian Church
- Duncan Village Presbyterian Church
- Ebenezer Presbyterian Church
- eMgwali Presbyterian Church
- Gonubie Presbyterian Church
- John Knox Bokwe Memorial Presbyterian Church
- JZS Ncevu Memorial Presbyterian Church
- Khobonqaba Presbyterian Church
- Lovedale Presbyterian Church
- Macfarlan Presbyterian Church
- Mdantsane NU3 Presbyterian Church
- Ndevana Presbyterian Church
- Parkside Presbyterian Church
- Pirie Mission Presbyterian Church
- Semple Memorial Presbyterian Church
- St Andrew's Presbyterian Church (West Bank)
- St Andrews's Presbyterian Church (King William's Town)
- St Columba's Presbyterian Church
- St Luke's Presbyterian Church
- St Patrick's Presbyterian Church
- St Paul's Presbyterial Church
- St Peter's Presbyterian Church
- St Phillip's Presbyterian Church
- Stirling Presbyterian Church
- Stuart Memorial Presbyterian Church
- Tarkastad Presbyterian Church
