= Reformed Presbyterian Church in Southern Africa =

The Reformed Presbyterian Church in Southern Africa was founded in 1923 by Scottish missionaries as the Bantu Presbyterian Church. This Church succeeded the missions of the United Free Church of Scotland and was formed following a commission headed by two of its deputies. The Church was renamed to the Reformed Presbyterian Church of Southern Africa in 1979. Following its independence in 1923, it spread all over South Africa with a membership concentrated primarily in Cape Town and Natal. Its members are mainly Afrikaans and colored. It had 52,000 members and 100 parishes. It later merged with the Presbyterian Church of Southern Africa to form the Uniting Presbyterian Church in Southern Africa in 1999.
