= Tez Kharab, Shahin Dezh =

Village in West Azerbaijan province, Iran

Tez Kharab Persian: تزخراب
- Village
- Location within Iran
- Coordinates: 36°52′47″N 46°26′03″E
- Country: Iran
- Province: West Azerbaijan
- County: Shahin Dezh
- District: Keshavarz
- Rural District: Keshavarz

Population (2016)
  - Total: 833
- Time zone: UTC+3:30 (IRST)

Tez Kharab (Persian: تزخراب) (Note: Also romanized as Tez Kharāb) is a village in Keshavarz Rural District of Keshavarz District in Shahin Dezh County, West Azerbaijan province, Iran.

== Demographics ==
=== Population ===
At the time of the 2006 National Census, the village's population was 775 in 159 households. The following census in 2011 counted 848 people in 211 households. The 2016 census measured the population of the village as 833 people in 252 households.
