= Davan, Gilan =

Village in Gilan province, Iran

Davan Persian: داوان
- Village
- Location within Iran
- Coordinates: 37°56′11″N 48°53′28″E
- Country: Iran
- Province: Gilan
- County: Talesh
- District: Kargan Rud
- Rural District: Lisar

Population (2016)
  - Total: 1,064
- Time zone: UTC+3:30 (IRST)

Davan (Persian: داوان) (Note: Also romanized as Dāvān) is a village in Lisar Rural District of Kargan Rud District in Talesh County, Gilan province, Iran.

== Demographics ==
=== Population ===
At the time of the 2006 National Census, the village's population was 977 in 233 households. The following census in 2011 counted 1,072 people in 300 households. The 2016 census measured the population of the village as 1,064 people in 328 households.
