= Qareh Quyunlu, Shahin Dezh =

Village in West Azerbaijan province, Iran

Qareh Quyunlu Persian: قره قويونلو
- Village
- Location within Iran
- Coordinates: 36°48′56″N 46°23′51″E
- Country: Iran
- Province: West Azerbaijan
- County: Shahin Dezh
- District: Keshavarz
- Rural District: Keshavarz

Population (2016)
  - Total: 857
- Time zone: UTC+3:30 (IRST)

Qareh Quyunlu (Persian: قره قويونلو) (Note: Also romanized as Qareh Qowyunlu, Qareh Qowyūnlū, and Qareh Qūyūnlū; also known as Qareh Qoynlū) is a village in Keshavarz Rural District of Keshavarz District in Shahin Dezh County, West Azerbaijan province, Iran.

== Demographics ==
=== Population ===
At the time of the 2006 National Census, the village's population was 791 in 164 households. The following census in 2011 counted 843 people in 219 households. The 2016 census measured the population of the village as 857 people in 264 households.
