= Uniting Presbyterian Church in Southern Africa =

Reformed church

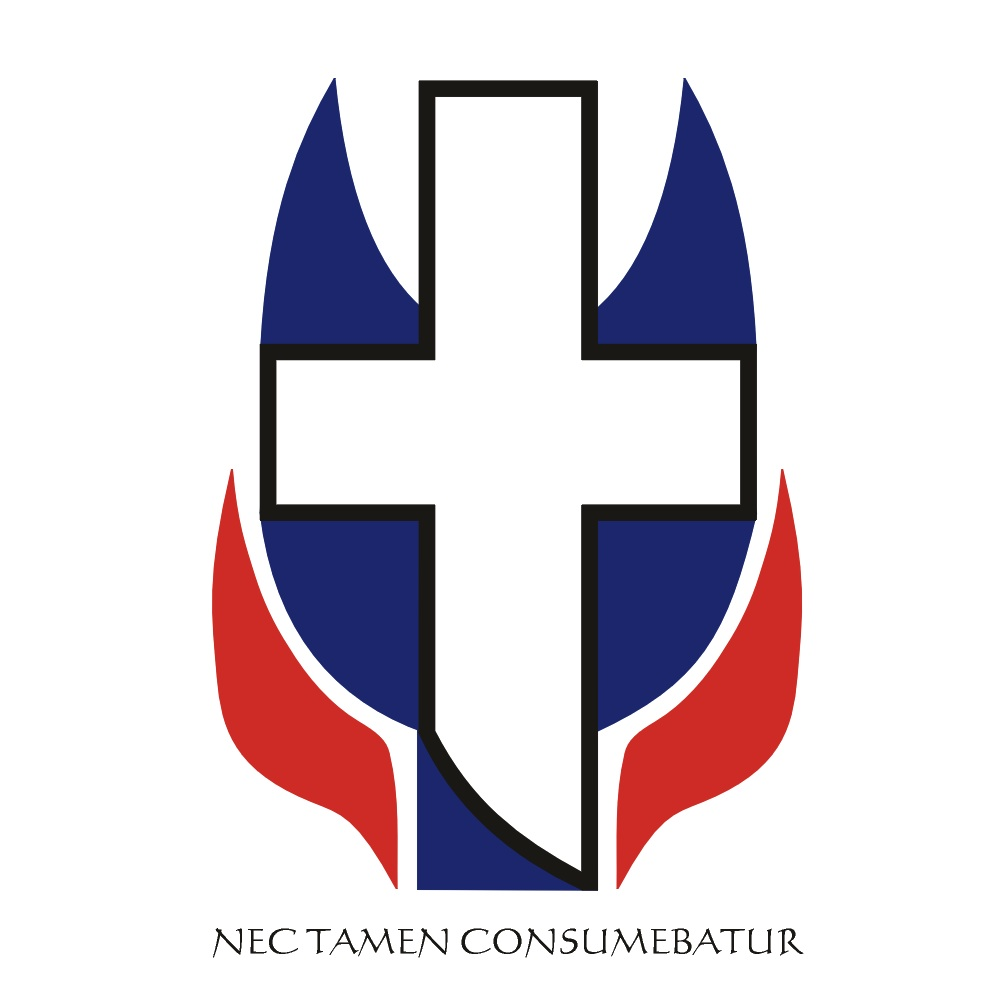
- NEC TAMEN CONSUMEBATUR
- Classification: Protestant
- Orientation: Presbyterian
- Scripture: Protestant Bible
- Theology: Reformed
- Polity: Presbyterian
- Associations: All Africa Conference of Churches; World Communion of Reformed Churches; World Council of Churches; South African Council of Churches
- Region: South Africa, Zimbabwe and Zambia
- Origin: 26 September 1999; Port Elizabeth
- Merger of: Reformed Presbyterian Church in Southern Africa & Presbyterian Church of Southern Africa
- Congregations: 472
- Members: 500,000
- Official website: unitingpresbyterian.org

The Uniting Presbyterian Church in Southern Africa (UPCSA) is a Presbyterian denomination in the Southern Africa. It is a member of the World Communion of Reformed Churches.

The church’s motto, Nec tamen consumebatur, is adapted from the Latin translation of Exodus 3:2: "...The Lord appeared to him in a blazing fire from the midst of a bush; and he looked, and behold, the bush was burning with fire, yet it was not consumed."

== History ==
Both churches shared a common origin dating back to the 19th century, when Britain took control of the Cape Colony. The Presbyterian Church of Southern Africa was established among soldiers and settlers who arrived in the Cape in 1820, later expanding northwards into present-day Zimbabwe and Zambia. The Reformed Presbyterian Church, on the other hand, emerged from Scottish missionary efforts aimed at indigenous Africans and began at Lovedale Mission in Alice. It became an autonomous church in 1923.

The first Presbyterian congregation in Rhodesia was founded in 1896 in Bulawayo, followed by another in Salisbury (now Harare) in 1903.

In 1999, the Reformed Presbyterian Church in Southern Africa (‘'RPCSA’') and the Presbyterian Church of Southern Africa (‘'PCSA’') merged to form the Uniting Presbyterian Church of Southern Africa.

In 2025, the Church would have 472 congregations and 500,000 members.

== Beliefs ==
The Uniting Presbyterian Church in Southern Africa (UPCSA) ordains both men and women as ministers and elders, a practice inherited from its predecessor, the Presbyterian Church of Southern Africa.

=== Marriage ===
A 2015 resolution allows local churches to decide about blessings of same-sex marriage.

== Presbyteries ==
=== South Africa ===
- Amathole
- Central Cape
- Drakensberg
- eGoli
- eThekwini
- Trans Xhariep
- Highveld
- Lekoa
- Limpopo
- Thukela
- East Griqualand
- Mthatha
- Tiyo Soga Memorial
- Tshwane
- Western Cape

=== Zambia ===
- Copperbelt
- Munali
- M'chinga

=== Zimbabwe ===
- Zimbabwe

=== Democratic Republic of Congo ===
- Democratic Republic of Congo

== Associations/ministry groups ==
The Basis of Union is a contract that was signed in September 1999 by the Presbyterian Church of Southern Africa (PCSA) and the Reformed Presbyterian Church in South Africa (RPCSA). Under this contract, the two churches merged to form the Uniting Presbyterian Church in Southern Africa (UPCSA). Article 13 of the Basis of Union stipulates that, as a condition of the union, both churches were to contribute four associations each, which were subsequently merged to form only four associations—a women's association, a men's association, a girls' association, and a youth association.

- The Girls' Christian Association (GCA) of RPCSA and JB (named after Janet Burnside, the wife of Rev. Tiyo Soga) of PCSA united to form IYZA (Inhlangano Yezintombi ZamaRhabe Amanyanayo), now known as the Fellowship of Young Women.
- The two women's associations merged to form the Uniting Presbyterian Women's Fellowship (UPWF), now known as the Fellowship of Women.
- The Presbyterian Men's Association (PMA) of PCSA and the Young Men's Guild (YMG) of RPCSA united to form the Men's Christian Guild (MCG), now known as the Fellowship of Men.
- The two youth associations merged to form the UPCSA Youth Fellowship (UPCSA YF).
- Additionally, there is the Fellowship of Church Choirs and Musicians.

== Confessions of faith ==
- Nicene Creed
- Apostles Creed
- Declaration of faith for the Church in Southern Africa
- Faith of the Uniting Presbyterian Church in Southern Africa

== See also ==
- Christianity
- Presbyterianism
- Reformed churches
- Presbyterian polity
- World Communion of Reformed Churches
- World Alliance of Reformed Churches
