= Egoli: City of Gold =

Play by Matsemela Manaka

Egoli ("city of gold", also eGoli, the Sotho name for Johannesburg) is a play by South African playwright Matsemela Manaka that focuses on the condition of migrant mine workers in South Africa. In the play he exposes stereotypes and presents the Black man as economically exploited. According to critic Keyan Tomaselli, Egoli is not to be interpreted as entertainment; rather, it exposes the dominance racist ideology, which is uncomfortable for both the dominant and the dominated because it reveals its inconsistencies and criticizes its motivations.

== Plot ==
The two characters John and Hamilton were imprisoned together; one for political crimes and the other for rape and murder. In Act One, shows their time together as they relax before bedtime. Act Two, a dream sequence took place of their time in prison, how they released each other from chains and escaped. They returned to the mines the following morning. There is an explosion and they crawl to sanctuary. In the final scene, John hears from Hamilton in the mine, that his son was trapped in the mine shaft and killed.

== Publishing ==
The final version of Egoli was published August 1, 1982. It is a collaboration between Matsemela Manaka and the play's two actors, John Moalusi Ledwaba and Hamilton Mahonga Silwane.

It was this printed version, published by Ravan Press in Johannesburg, that was banned in 1981 by South African authorities. Performances at Johannesburg theatre escaped the authorities, opposed to some of the publicity when the play toured Britain in early 1982.

== Performances ==
Egoli has been staged for mixed audiences in majority white cities of Germany, United Kingdom, as well as townships in South Africa.
