= Qaleh Bin, Kargan Rud =

Village in Gilan province, Iran

Qaleh Bin Persian: قلعه بين
- Village
- Location within Iran
- Coordinates: 37°56′18″N 48°54′56″E
- Country: Iran
- Province: Gilan
- County: Talesh
- District: Kargan Rud
- Rural District: Lisar

Population (2016)
  - Total: 1,436
- Time zone: UTC+3:30 (IRST)

Qaleh Bin (Persian: قلعه بين) (Note: Also romanized as Qal‘eh Bīn and Qal‘eh Beyn; also known as Qal‘eh bin Watkeh) is a village in Lisar Rural District of Kargan Rud District in Talesh County, Gilan province, Iran.

== Demographics ==
=== Population ===
At the time of the 2006 National Census, the village's population was 1,399 in 343 households. The following census in 2011 counted 1,366 people in 372 households. The 2016 census measured the population of the village as 1,436 people in 440 households.
