= Keshavarz-e Khotbeh Sara =

Village in Gilan province, Iran

Keshavarz-e Khotbeh Sara Persian: كشاورزخطبه سرا
- Village
- Location within Iran
- Coordinates: 38°00′43″N 48°53′39″E
- Country: Iran
- Province: Gilan
- County: Talesh
- District: Kargan Rud
- Rural District: Khotbeh Sara

Population (2016)
  - Total: 787
- Time zone: UTC+3:30 (IRST)

Keshavarz-e Khotbeh Sara (Persian: كشاورزخطبه سرا) (Note: Also romanized as Keshāvarz-e Khoţbeh Sarā) is a village in Khotbeh Sara Rural District of Kargan Rud District in Talesh County, Gilan province, Iran.

== Demographics ==
=== Population ===
At the time of the 2006 National Census, the village's population was 784 in 196 households. The following census in 2011 counted 814 people in 247 households. The 2016 census measured the population of the village as 787 people in 255 households.
