= Kahel-e Sofla =

Kahel-e Sofla كهل سفلي
- Village
- Location within Iran
- Coordinates: 36°45′09″N 46°37′29″E
- Country: Iran
- Province: West Azerbaijan
- County: Shahin Dezh
- Bakhsh: Keshavarz
- Rural District: Chaharduli

Population (2006)
  - Total: 96
- Time zone: UTC+3:30 (IRST)
  - Summer (DST): UTC+4:30 (IRDT)

Kahel-e Sofla (Persian: كهل سفلي, also Romanized as Kahel-e Soflá; also known as Kahūl-e Pā'īn) is a village in Chaharduli Rural District, Keshavarz District, Shahin Dezh County, West Azerbaijan Province, Iran. At the 2006 census, its population was 96, in 24 families.
