= Goli, Iran =

Goli or Geli or Golli (Persian: گلي), sometimes rendered as Guli, in Iran may refer to:

- Goli, Ardabil
- Goli, Khalkhal, Ardabil Province
- Golli, Nir, Ardabil Province
- Goli, Charuymaq, East Azerbaijan Province
- Geli, Kermanshah
- Guli, Kermanshah
- Goli, North Khorasan
- Goli, Sistan and Baluchestan
- Goli, West Azerbaijan
- Guli, West Azerbaijan
- Goli, Zanjan
