= Dayuan station =

Dayuan station can refer to:

- Dayuan station (Chengdu Metro), a metro station in Chengdu, China
- Dayuan metro station, a metro station in Taoyuan, Taiwan
- Dayuan railway station, a railway station in Guangzhou, China
