= Goli Vrh, Gorenja Vas–Poljane =

Goli Vrh
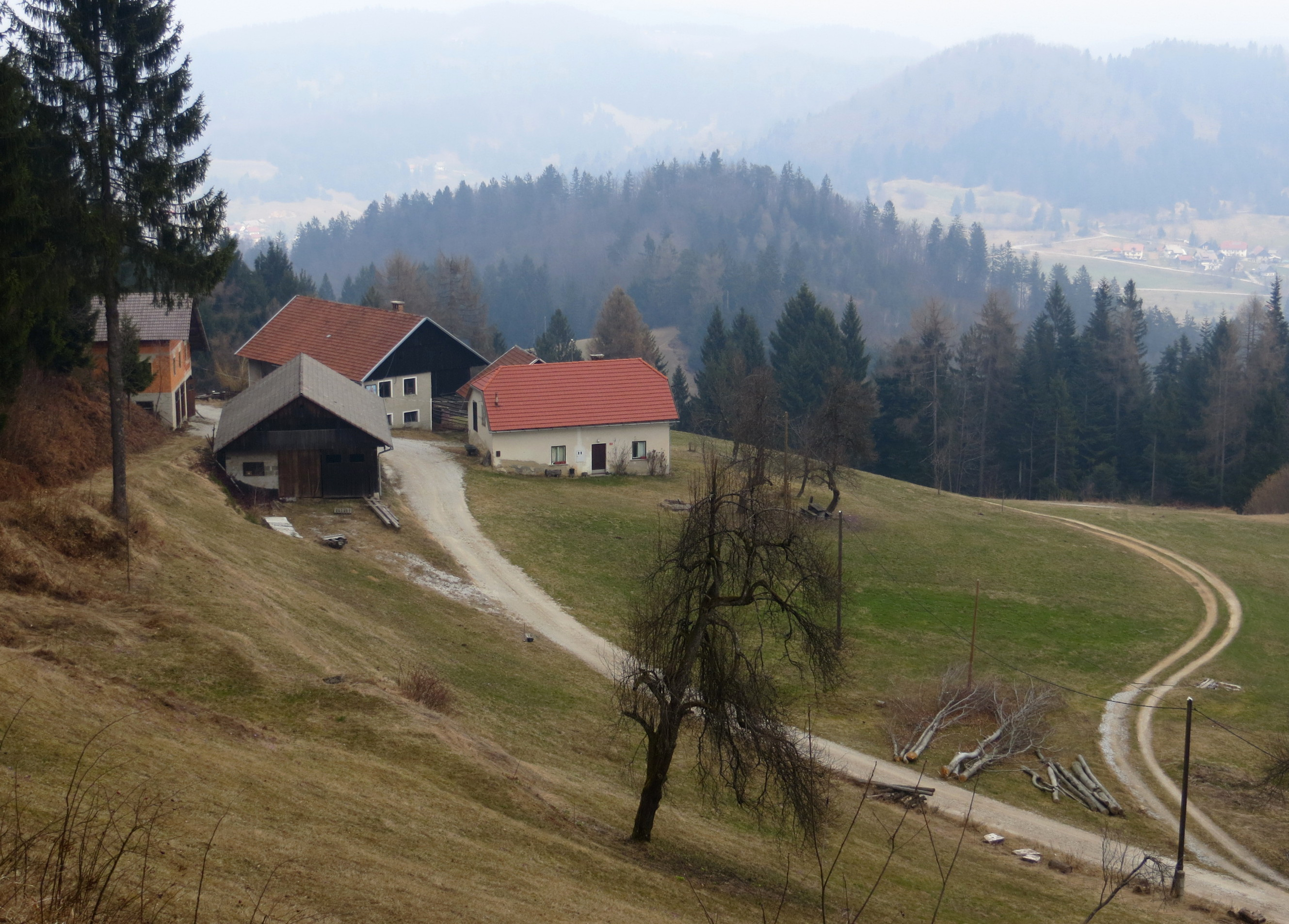
- The hamlet of Košir in Goli Vrh

- Location in Slovenia
- Coordinates: 46°2′32.46″N 14°10′59.82″E
- Country: Slovenia
- Traditional region: Upper Carniola
- Statistical region: Upper Carniola
- Municipality: Gorenja Vas–Poljane

Area
  - Total: 4.44 km^{2} (1.71 sq mi)
- Elevation: 889 m (2,917 ft)

Population (2020)
  - Total: 43
  - Density: 9.7/km^{2} (25/sq mi)

Goli Vrh (pronounced [ˈɡɔːli ˈʋəɾx]) is a dispersed settlement in the Municipality of Gorenja Vas–Poljane in the Upper Carniola region of Slovenia. It includes part of the hamlet of Suhi Dol in the eastern part of the settlement.

== Rupnik Line ==
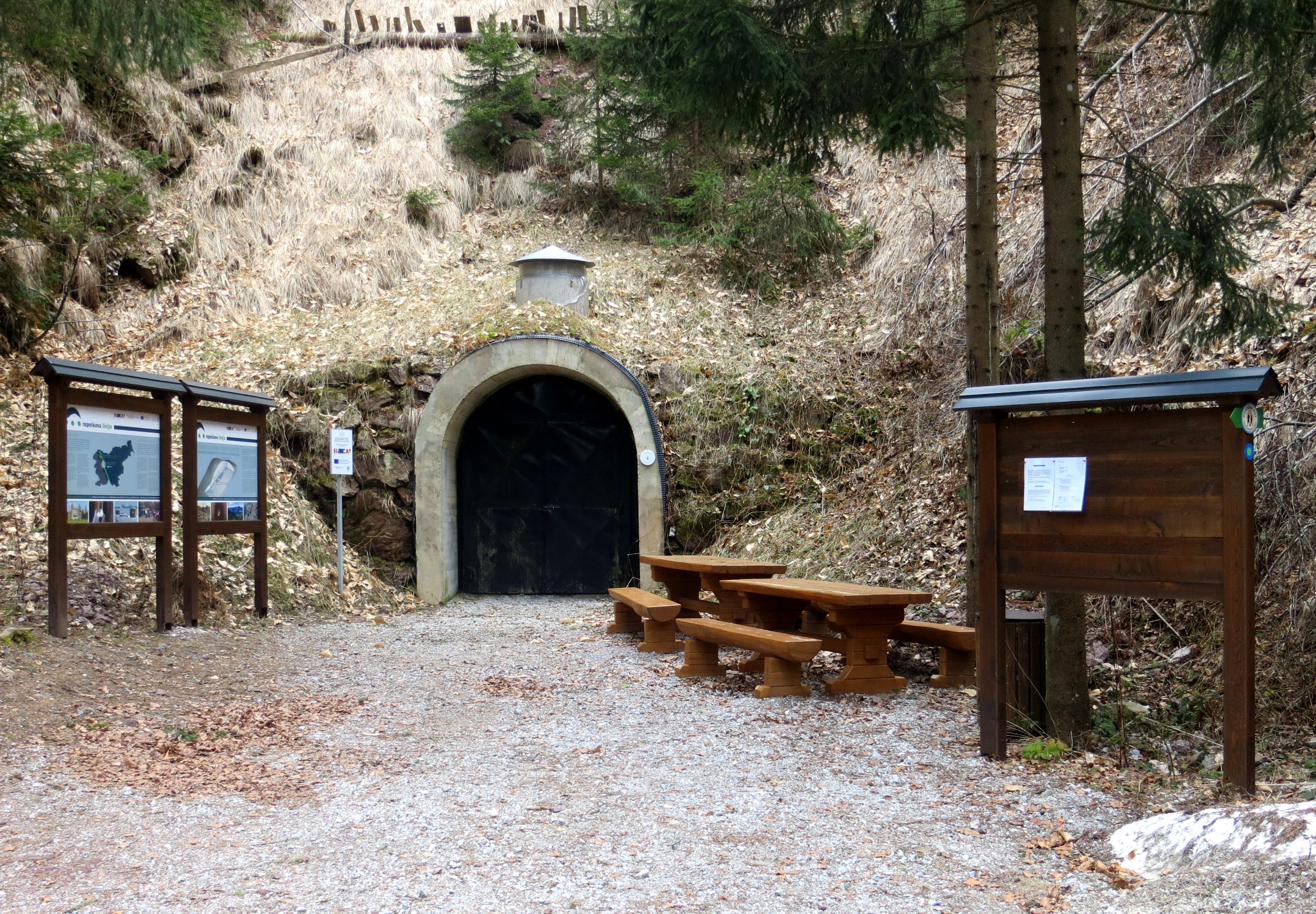
Entrance

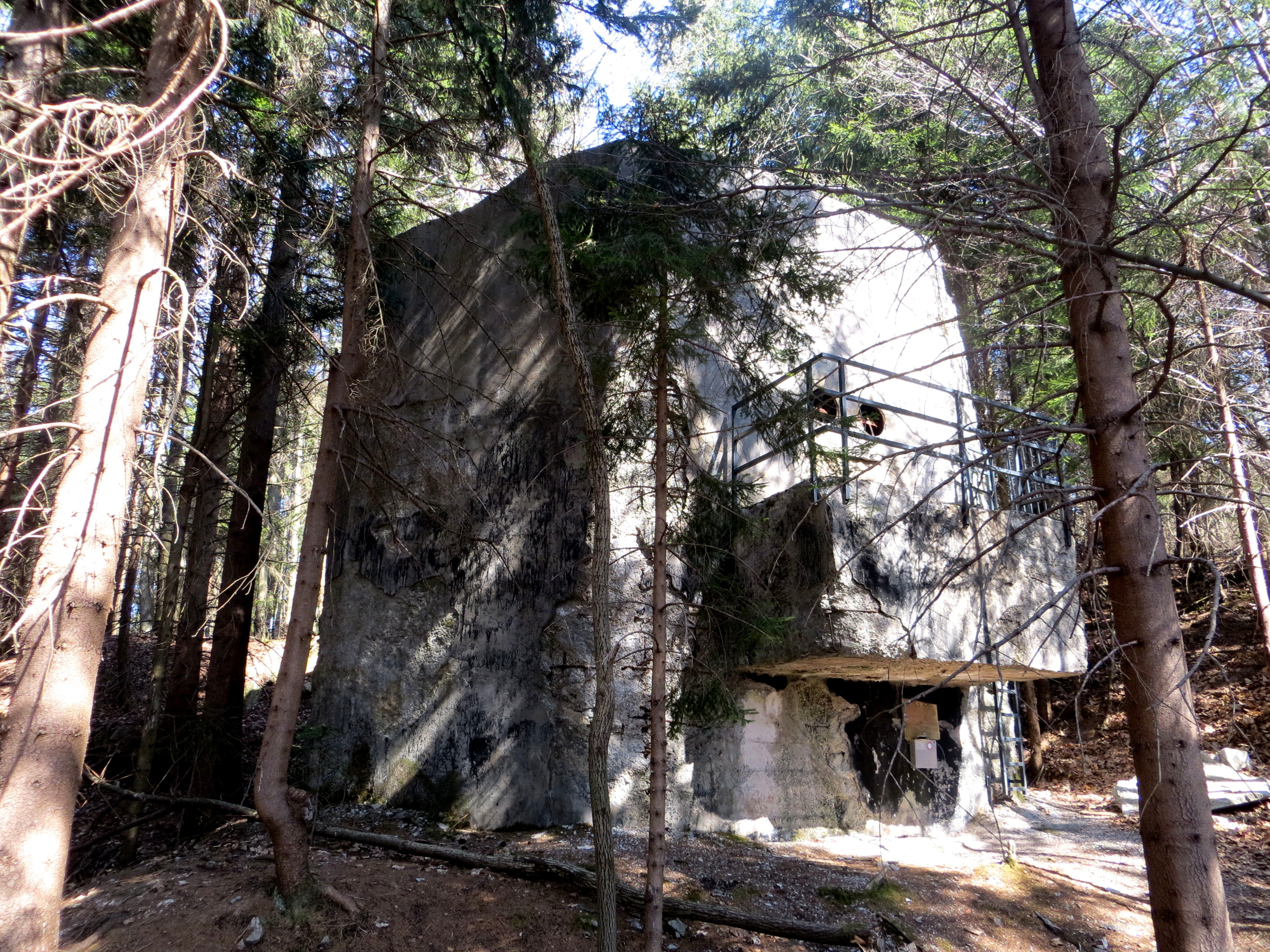
Casemate

Goli Vrh bunker

Goli Vrh lies along the route of the Rupnik Line, a fortification system dating from the 1930s. The Goli Vrh bunker is one of the largest preserved bunkers in the western part of the line.
