= Tizkharab, Urmia =

Tizkharab تيزخراب
- Village
- Location within Iran
- Coordinates: 37°23′08″N 45°16′17″E
- Country: Iran
- Province: West Azerbaijan
- County: Urmia
- Bakhsh: Central
- Rural District: Torkaman

Population (2006)
  - Total: 262
- Time zone: UTC+3:30 (IRST)
  - Summer (DST): UTC+4:30 (IRDT)

Tizkharab (Persian: تيزخراب, also romanized as Tīzkharāb) is a village in Torkaman Rural District, in the Central District of Urmia County, West Azerbaijan Province, Iran. At the 2006 census its population was 262, in 76 families.
