= Presbytery of Egoli =

South African presbytery

The Presbytery of Egoli is a presbytery based in Johannesburg, South Africa. It stretches from Randfontein and Kagiso to Edenvale and from Midrand to Mulbarton.

== List of congregations ==
There are 29 congregations in the Presbytery of Egoli.

Congregations
Congregation	Summary
Alexandra Presbyterian Church	
B E Ngubane Memorial Presbyterian Church	
4ways United Church	
Johannesburg Presbyterian Church	
Kagiso Presbyterian Church	
Kensington United Church	
Linden Presbyterian Church	
Mayfair Presbyterian Church	
Meadowlands Presbyterian Church	
Midrand Presbyterian Church	
Moletsane Presbyterian Church	
Mount Faith Presbyterian Church	
Orlando Presbyterian Church	
Randpark Ridge United Church	
St Barnabas United Church	
St Columba's Presbyterian Church	
St Giles Presbyterian Church	
St James Presbyterian Church	
St John the Evangelist United Church	
St John's Presbyterian Church	
St Magnus Presbyterian Church	
St Mark's Presbyterian Church	
St Mungo's United Church	
St Ninians Presbyterian Church	
St Patrick's Presbyterian Church	
St Paul's United Church	
St Stephen's Presbyterian Church	
Struben's Valley United Church	
Trinity Presbyterian Church	

== Tensions with Presbytery of the Western Cape ==
In 2015, Hansie Wolmarans and Martin Young, both ministers in the Presbytery of Egoli, officiated at the civil union of a same-sex couple. In response, the Presbytery of the Western Cape petitioned for the Uniting Presbyterian Church in Southern Africa to formally ban ministers from officiating at such unions.
