= Qarah Quyunlu, Urmia =

Qarah Quyunlu قره قويونلو
- Village
- Location within Iran
- Coordinates: 37°46′31″N 45°06′33″E
- Country: Iran
- Province: West Azerbaijan
- County: Urmia
- Bakhsh: Nazlu
- Rural District: Nazlu-e Shomali

Population (2006)
  - Total: 22
- Time zone: UTC+3:30 (IRST)
  - Summer (DST): UTC+4:30 (IRDT)

Qarah Quyunlu (Persian: قره قويونلو, also Romanized as Qarah Qūyūnlū and Qarāqūyūnlū) is a village in Nazlu-e Shomali Rural District, Nazlu District, Urmia County, West Azerbaijan Province, Iran. At the 2006 census, its population was 22, in 7 families.
