= Keshavarz, Iran =

City in West Azerbaijan province, Iran

Keshavarz Persian: كشاورز
- City
- Location within Iran
- Coordinates: 36°50′07″N 46°21′33″E
- Country: Iran
- Province: West Azerbaijan
- County: Shahin Dezh
- District: Keshavarz
- Established as a city: 2000

Population (2016)
  - Total: 4,138
- Time zone: UTC+3:30 (IRST)

Keshavarz (Persian: كشاورز) (Note: Also romanized as Keshāvarz; also known as Kashāvar) is a city in, and the capital of, Keshavarz District in Shahin Dezh County, West Azerbaijan province, Iran. It also serves as the administrative center for Keshavarz Rural District. The village of Keshavarz was converted to a city in 2000 and lies along on the Zarrineh River.

== Demographics ==
=== Ethnicity ===
The city is populated by Azerbaijanians and Kurds.

=== Population ===
At the time of the 2006 National Census, the city's population was 3,538 in 940 households. The following census in 2011 counted 3,904 people in 1,154 households. The 2016 census measured the population of the city as 4,138 people in 1,248 households.
