= Matsemela Manaka =

South African playwright, poet, and artist (1956–1998)

Matsemela Manaka (1956–1998) was a South African playwright, poet, and artist. He began his career in the mid-1970s and was influenced by the ideas of the Black Consciousness Movement. Among his plays, the most distinguished are Egoli: City of Gold and Children of Asazi. He won the PEN/Barbara Goldsmith Freedom to Write Award in 1987.

== Early life and education ==
Manaka was born on 20 June 1956, in Alexandra township. He attended primary and secondary school in Diepkloof, and spent the majority of his life in Soweto. He then attended Ithumeng Commercial College studying commerce part-time. Manaka desired to attend a university, but the recently introduced requirement for Afrikaans, which wasn't offered at Ithumeng, was prohibitive. He then enrolled at Matibane High School in 1976, which did offer the language, but his attempt was voided, ironically, by the Soweto uprising that came as a response to the 1974 legislation demanding Afrikaans.

== Career ==
Manaka worked as a teacher and, already an admirer of the plays of Gibson Kente, developed an interest in theatre after witnessing his students participate in the 1976 Soweto uprising. He founded the Soyikwa African Theatre group in 1978, with students from the Creative Youth Association who had gotten together after the uprising. His work was often chosen through suggestion by students and staff. Soyikwa's first production was The Horn, followed by Imbumba, and then Egoli, the latter of which became a success when it was performed in the city. The group performed political satire drawing from both European and African traditions; themes included Pan-African and Black Consciousness as well as the realities of South African politics--apartheid, the continuing destruction of social life in townships, and widespread poverty in rural areas. Manaka's plays were a success in Europe as well.

He was awarded the PEN/Barbara Goldsmith Freedom to Write Award in 1987. With the award he funded a workshop for young playwrights in Soweto. Manaka participated in multiple initiatives such as The Creative Youth Association, Ravan Press, Staffrider. Matsemela Manaka died in a car accident in 1998.

== Plays ==
- The Horn
- Imbumba
- Egoli: City of Gold (1978)
- Blues Afrika Cafe (1980)
- Vuka (1981)
- Mbumba (1984)
- Children of Asazi (1984)
- Goree (musical), 1989
