= Tizkharab, Salmas =

Tizkharab تيزخراب
- Village
- Location within Iran
- Coordinates: 38°04′07″N 44°56′01″E
- Country: Iran
- Province: West Azerbaijan
- County: Salmas
- Bakhsh: Central
- Rural District: Kenarporuzh

Population (2006)
  - Total: 280
- Time zone: UTC+3:30 (IRST)
  - Summer (DST): UTC+4:30 (IRDT)

Tizkharab (Persian: تيزخراب, also Romanized as Tīzkharāb and Tīzkhar Āb; also known as Tabar Kharāb and Taz Kharāb) is a village in Kenarporuzh Rural District, in the Central District of Salmas County, West Azerbaijan Province, Iran. At the time of the 2006 census, its population was 280 people, in 51 families.
