= Kahel-e Olya =

Village in West Azerbaijan province, Iran

Kahel-e Olya Persian: كهل عليا
- Village
- Location within Iran
- Coordinates: 36°45′30″N 46°39′44″E
- Country: Iran
- Province: West Azerbaijan
- County: Shahin Dezh
- District: Keshavarz
- Rural District: Chaharduli

Population (2016)
  - Total: 303
- Time zone: UTC+3:30 (IRST)

Kahel-e Olya (Persian: كهل عليا) (Note: Also romanized as Kahel-e ‘Olyā; also known as Kahūl-e Bālā) is a village in Chaharduli Rural District of Keshavarz District in Shahin Dezh County, West Azerbaijan province, Iran.

== Demographics ==
=== Population ===
At the time of the 2006 National Census, the village's population was 314 in 62 households. The following census in 2011 counted 271 people in 67 households. The 2016 census measured the population of the village as 303 people in 78 households.
