= Dawan =

The terms Dawan or Dawans may refer to:

== Places ==
=== Yemen ===
- Wadi Dawan in Hadhramaut, Yemen
- Daw'an District of the Hadhramaut Governorate, Yemen

== Other uses ==
- Atoni, also known as Dawan, an ethnic group on Timor
- Dayuan, a historical people of West China (pinyin spelling)
- Dawan language, an Austronesian language spoken by Atoni people of West Timor
- a character in the short story Sing to the Dawn by the Chinese-American writer Minfong Ho
- Dàwàn, the original Chinese title of the film, Big Shot's Funeral
- Sigismund-Helmut von Dawans (1899–1944), German general

== See also ==
- Davan (disambiguation)
