= Gollis University =

University in Somaliland

Coordinates: 9°33′43″N 44°02′18″E

- جامعة جولس
- Other name: GU
- Motto: A beacon of knowledge
- Type: Private
- Established: 2004
- Chairman: Dr. Saeed A. H. Ibrahim
- President: Saeed Mohamed Ahmed
- Vice-president: [[]]
- Total staff: 436
- Students: 2,471
- Undergraduates: 2,397
- Postgraduates: 74
- Other students: 600^{a}
- Location: Hargeisa, Maroodi Jeex, Somaliland
- Campus: 32 acres (13 ha); Large City
- Colours: Blue, White, Yellow and Red
- Website: gollis.edu.sl gollis.edu.so gollisuniversity.org

Gollis University (GU) is a privately owned university in Hargeisa, the capital of Somaliland. It is situated near the Golis Mountains.

== Overview ==
Gollis University serves the Maroodi-Jeex Region and receives students from portions of the other five regions. It was founded in 2004 as a non-profit institution by Dr. Saeed Ahmed Hassan, it officially opened for student enrollment in 2005 and was upgraded to a university within 10 months of its opening. Starting with 40 criminal justice and 40 civil engineering students, the student population reached 706 at the end of 2007.

Today, the university offers faculties such as Computer Studies, Engineering, Management Science & Economics, Medicine & Health Sciences, Social Sciences & Law, Agriculture & Veterinary Medicine, Criminal Justice, and Civil Engineering, among others with both bachelor's and master’s degree programs.

The university operates one main campus in Hargeisa, the capital city of Somaliland, along with several campuses in other regions of Somaliland, including Berbera, Burcao, Erigavo, LasAnod, Buuhoodle, and one in Garowe, Somalia. The tuition fees from students (approximately $500.00/student/semester) are the main source of income for the University.

The university has established the Gollis University Research Institute (GURI). GURI promotes the delivery of research across all faculties and departments of Gollis University. It also promotes and coordinates research projects with other organizations, including higher education institutes, NGOs, professional organizations, and international organizations.

== Campuses ==
The university has several campuses in the region, including:

- Hargeisa Campus (Main Campus)
- Berbera Campus
- Burao Campus
- Erigavo Campus
- Las Anod Campus
- Buuhoodle Campus.
- Garowe Campus.

Undergraduate programs:

- Faculty of Engineering:
  - Bachelor of Civil engineering
  - Bachelor of Telecommunication engineering
  - Bachelor of Electrical engineering
  - Bachelor of Computer engineering
  - Bachelor of Industrial Engineering
- Faculty of Information Communication Technology
- Faculty of Management & Economics:
  - Bachelor of Business Management
  - Bachelor of Accounting and Finance
  - Bachelor of Economics
  - Bachelor of Business Information Technology
- Faculty of Geology & Water Resources
- Faculty of Agriculture
- Faculty of Veterinary Medicine
- Faculty of Medicine & Allied Health Sciences:
  - Medicine
  - Public Health
  - Nutrition
  - Clinical Laboratory
  - Anesthesia
  - Clinical Officers
- Faculty of Social and Behavioral Science:
  - Bachelor Development Studies
  - Bachelor of Social Science
  - Bachelor of Political Science and International Relations
- Faculty of Law.
- Faculty of Islamic Studies and Sharia
- Faculty of Education
- Faculty of Applied Statistics

== Postgraduate Master Degree programs ==
- Master of Business Administration (MBA)
- Master of Management.
- Master of Public Health.
