= Tezkharab, Urmia =

Tezkharab تزخراب
- Village
- Location within Iran
- Coordinates: 37°37′30″N 44°59′08″E
- Country: Iran
- Province: West Azerbaijan
- County: Urmia
- Bakhsh: Central
- Rural District: Rowzeh Chay

Population (2006)
  - Total: 216
- Time zone: UTC+3:30 (IRST)
  - Summer (DST): UTC+4:30 (IRDT)

Tezkharab (Persian: تزخراب, also Romanized as Tezkharāb; also known as Tīzkharāb) is a village in Rowzeh Chay Rural District, in the Central District of Urmia County, West Azerbaijan Province, Iran. At the 2006 census, its population was 216, in 65 families.
