= Lisar =

City in Gilan province, Iran

Lisar Persian: ليسار
- City
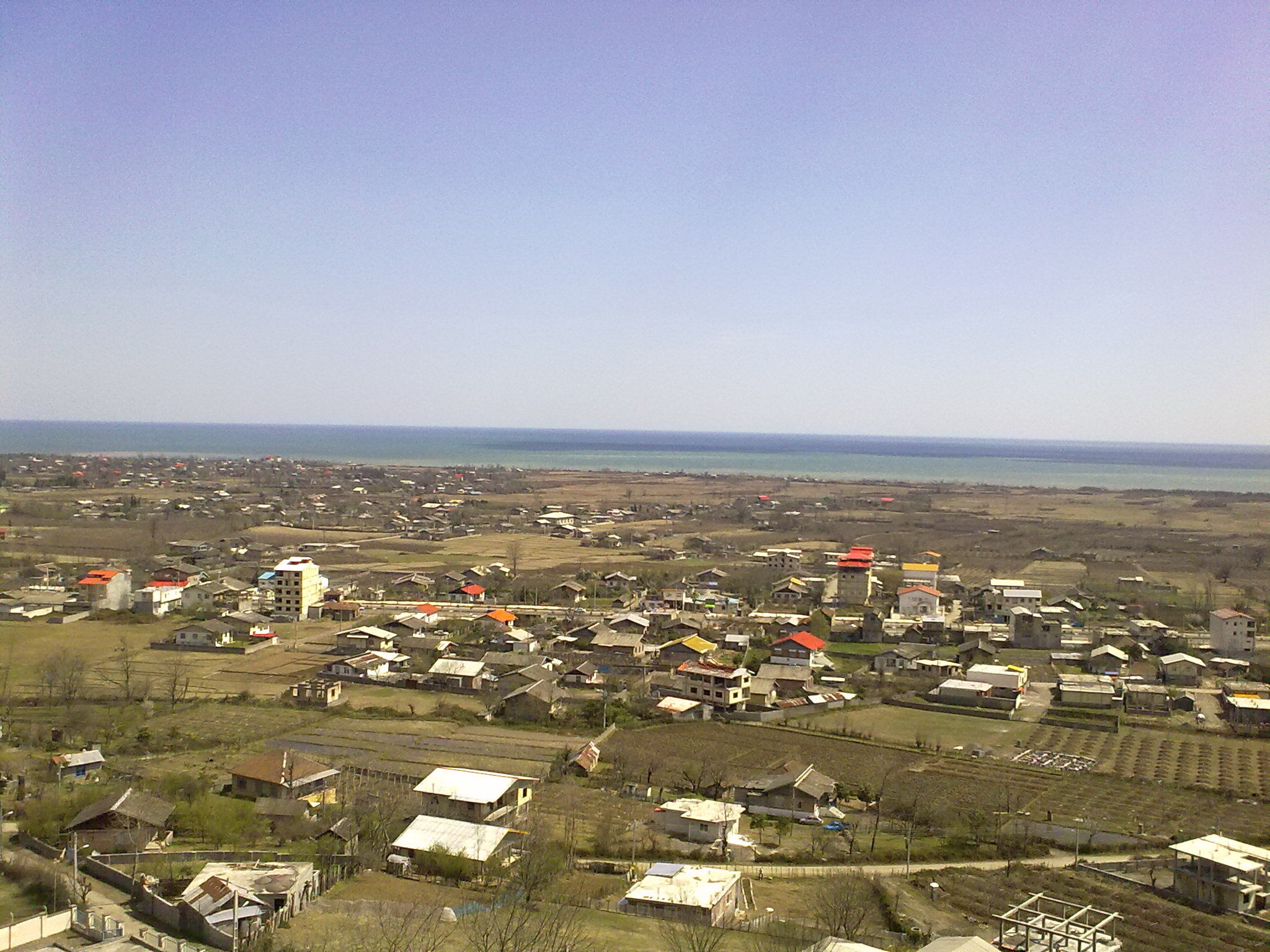
- The city of Lisar in 2012

- Location within Iran
- Coordinates: 37°57′27″N 48°54′32″E
- Country: Iran
- Province: Gilan
- County: Talesh
- District: Kargan Rud
- Established as a city: 2000

Population (2016)
  - Total: 3,647
- Time zone: UTC+3:30 (IRST)

Lisar (Persian: ليسار) (Note: Also romanized as Līsār and Lissar; also known as Līssār Bāzār) is a city in, and the capital of, Kargan Rud District in Talesh County, Gilan province, Iran. It also serves as the administrative center for Lisar Rural District. The village of Lisar was converted to a city in 2000.

== Demographics ==
=== Population ===
At the time of the 2006 National Census, the city's population was 2,599 in 679 households. The following census in 2011 counted 3,262 people in 951 households. The 2016 census measured the population of the city as 3,647 people in 1,163 households.
