= Keshavarz Rural District =

Rural district in West Azerbaijan province, Iran

Keshavarz Rural District Persian: دهستان کشاورز
- Rural District
- Location within Iran
- Coordinates: 36°50′N 46°23′E
- Country: Iran
- Province: West Azerbaijan
- County: Shahin Dezh
- District: Keshavarz
- Established: 1987
- Capital: Keshavarz

Population (2016)
  - Total: 10,153
- Time zone: UTC+3:30 (IRST)

Keshavarz Rural District (Persian: دهستان کشاورز) is in Keshavarz District of Shahin Dezh County, West Azerbaijan province, Iran. It is administered from the city of Keshavarz.

== Demographics ==
=== Population ===
At the time of the 2006 National Census, the rural district's population was 11,179 in 2,516 households. There were 10,658 inhabitants in 2,865 households at the following census of 2011. The 2016 census measured the population of the rural district as 10,153 in 3,098 households. The most populous of its 24 villages was Ahmadabad, with 1,639 people.

=== Other villages in the rural district ===
- Aghcheh Masjed
- Aqbal
- Chaplujeh
- Khalvat
- Najjar
- Qaban Kandi
- Qareh Quyunlu
- Qazanlu
- Tez Kharab
