= Khotbeh Sara Rural District =

Rural district in Gilan province, Iran

Khotbeh Sara Rural District Persian: دهستان خطبه سرا
- Rural District
- Location within Iran
- Coordinates: 38°00′N 48°45′E
- Country: Iran
- Province: Gilan
- County: Talesh
- District: Kargan Rud
- Established: 2002
- Capital: Khotbeh Sara

Population (2016)
  - Total: 14,291
- Time zone: UTC+3:30 (IRST)

Khotbeh Sara Rural District (Persian: دهستان خطبه سرا) is in Kargan Rud District of Talesh County, Gilan province, Iran. Its capital is the village of Khotbeh Sara.

== Demographics ==
=== Population ===
At the time of the 2006 National Census, the rural district's population was 13,495 in 3,436 households. There were 14,036 inhabitants in 4,075 households at the following census of 2011. The 2016 census measured the population of the rural district as 14,291 in 4,553 households. The most populous of its 30 villages was Keshli, with 2,920 people.

=== Other villages in the rural district ===
- Ashik Aghasi
- Bura Sara
- Chupan Mahalleh
- Keshavarz-e Khotbeh Sara
- Khvajeh Kari
- Li Sara
