= Lisar Rural District =

Rural district in Gilan province, Iran

Lisar Rural District Persian: دهستان ليسار
- Rural District
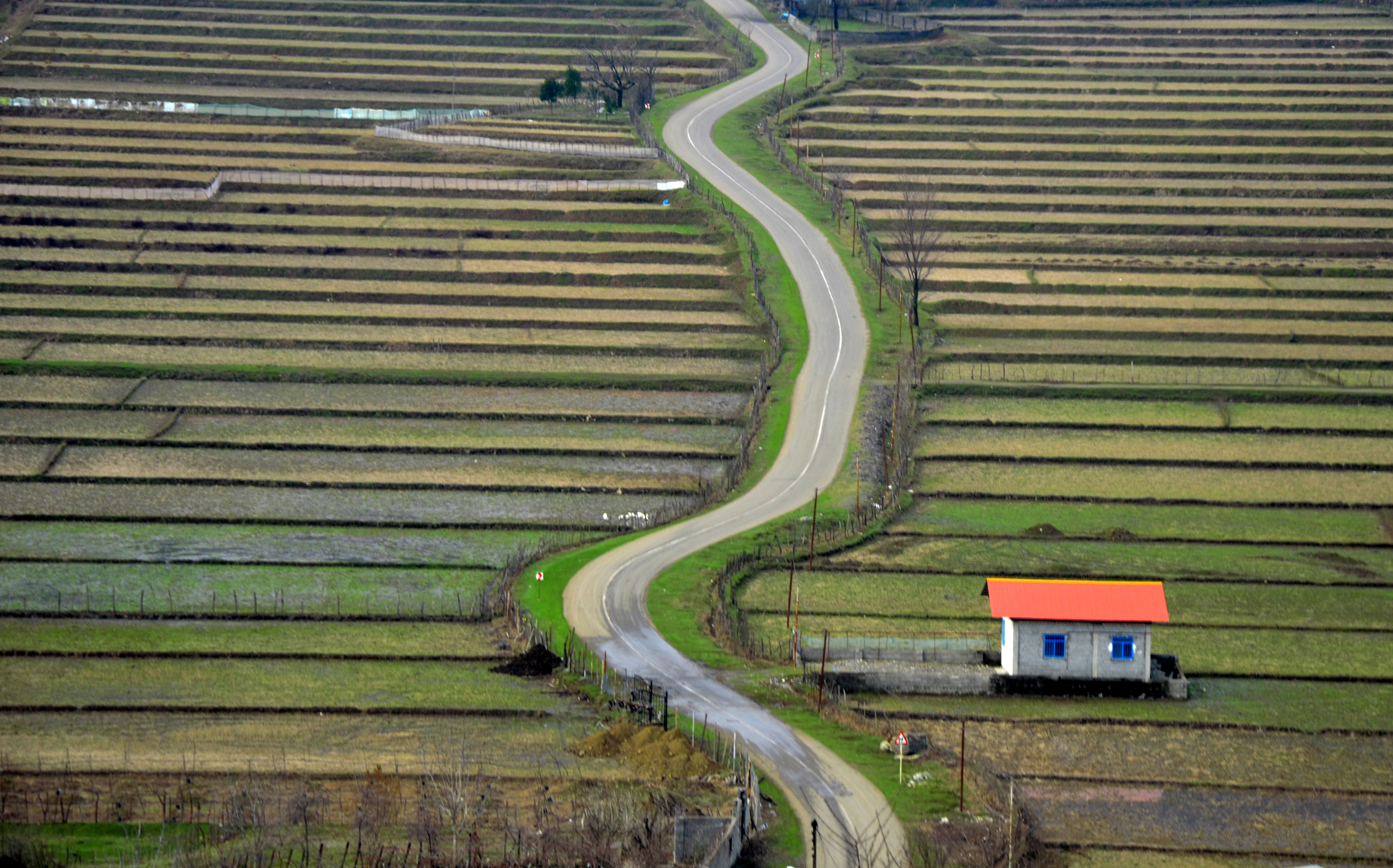
- Landscape in Lisar Rural District

- Location within Iran
- Coordinates: 38°01′N 48°48′E
- Country: Iran
- Province: Gilan
- County: Talesh
- District: Kargan Rud
- Established: 1987
- Capital: Lisar

Population (2016)
  - Total: 8,570
- Time zone: UTC+3:30 (IRST)

Lisar Rural District (Persian: دهستان ليسار) is in Kargan Rud District of Talesh County, Gilan province, Iran. It is administered from the city of Lisar.

== Demographics ==
=== Language ===
The dialect of Lisar belongs to Talysh.

=== Population ===
At the time of the 2006 National Census, the rural district's population was 8,710 in 2,101 households. There were 8,248 inhabitants in 2,320 households at the following census of 2011. The 2016 census measured the population of the rural district as 8,570 in 2,743 households. The most populous of its 37 villages was Hareh Dasht, with 1,569 people.

=== Other villages in the rural district ===
- Agari Bujaq
- Davan
- Mahmudabad
- Owtar
- Qaleh Bin
- Seyyed Lar
