= Chaharduli Rural District (Shahin Dezh County) =

Rural district in West Azerbaijan province, Iran

Chaharduli Rural District Persian: دهستان چهاردولی
- Rural District
- Location within Iran
- Coordinates: 36°50′N 46°40′E
- Country: Iran
- Province: West Azerbaijan
- County: Shahin Dezh
- District: Keshavarz
- Established: 1987
- Capital: Sevarin

Population (2016)
  - Total: 4,986
- Time zone: UTC+3:30 (IRST)

Chaharduli Rural District (Persian: دهستان چهاردولی) is in Keshavarz District of Shahin Dezh County, West Azerbaijan province, Iran. Its capital is the village of Sevarin.

== Demographics ==
=== Population ===
At the time of the 2006 National Census, the rural district's population was 6,353 in 1,324 households. There were 5,470 inhabitants in 1,422 households at the following census of 2011. The 2016 census measured the population of the rural district as 4,986 in 1,451 households. The most populous of its 36 villages was Zaher Kandi, with 664 people.

=== Other villages in the rural district ===
- Alaguz
- Alichin
- Kahel-e Olya
- Qarah Qayeh
- Qatur
- Reza Qeshlaq
