= Kargan Rud District =

District in Gilan province, Iran

Kargan Rud District Persian: بخش کرگان‌رود
- District
- Location within Iran
- Coordinates: 38°01′N 48°46′E
- Country: Iran
- Province: Gilan
- County: Talesh
- Established: 2002
- Capital: Lisar

Population (2016)
  - Total: 26,508
- Time zone: UTC+3:30 (IRST)

Kargan Rud District (Persian: بخش کرگان‌رود) is in Talesh County, Gilan province, in northwestern Iran. Its capital is the city of Lisar

== History ==
The area was historically part of the Karganrud Khanate. It was created after the Russo-Persian War, when Fath 'Ali Shah divided Persian Talesh among 5 prominent families to weaken Mir Mostafa Khan's power.

== Language ==
The dialect of Kargan Rud is a variety of Talysh.

=== Population ===
At the time of the 2006 National Census, the district's population was 24,804 in 6,216 households. The following census in 2011 counted 25,546 people in 7,346 households. The 2016 census measured the population of the district as 26,508 inhabitants in 8,459 households.

=== Administrative divisions ===
Kargan Rud District Population
Administrative Divisions	2006	2011	2016
Khotbeh Sara RD	13,495	14,036	14,291
Lisar RD	8,710	8,248	8,570
Lisar (city)	2,599	3,262	3,647
Total	24,804	25,546	26,508
RD = Rural District
