= Keshavarz District =

District in West Azerbaijan province, Iran

Keshavarz District Persian: بخش کشاورز
- District
- Location within Iran
- Coordinates: 36°50′N 46°33′E
- Country: Iran
- Province: West Azerbaijan
- County: Shahin Dezh
- Established: 1990
- Capital: Keshavarz

Population (2016)
  - Total: 19,277
- Time zone: UTC+3:30 (IRST)

Keshavarz District (Persian: بخش کشاورز) is in Shahin Dezh County, West Azerbaijan province, Iran. Its capital is the city of Keshavarz.

== Demographics ==
=== Population ===
At the time of the 2006 National Census, the district's population was 21,070 in 4,780 households. The following census in 2011 counted 20,032 people in 5,441 households. The 2016 census measured the population of the district as 19,277 inhabitants in 5,797 households.

=== Administrative divisions ===
Keshavarz District Population
Administrative Divisions	2006	2011	2016
Chaharduli RD	6,353	5,470	4,986
Keshavarz RD	11,179	10,658	10,153
Keshavarz (city)	3,538	3,904	4,138
Total	21,070	20,032	19,277
RD = Rural District
