= Kuhestan =

Kuhestan (Persian: كوهستان) may refer to:

- Kuhestan, Rezvanshahr, Gilan Province
- Kuhestan, Haviq, Talesh Chounty, Gilan Province
- Kuhestan-e Haviq, Talesh Chounty, Gilan Province
- Kuhestan, Kargan Rud, Talesh Chounty, Gilan Province
- Kuhestan, Kerman
- Kuhestan, Mazandaran
- Kuhestan Rural District (disambiguation)
