= Hajj Yadollah Mahalleh =

Hajj Yadollah Mahalleh حاج يداله محله
- Neighborhood
- Location within Iran
- Coordinates: 38°10′09″N 48°54′05″E
- Country: Iran
- Province: Gilan
- County: Talesh
- Bakhsh: Haviq
- City: Chubar

Population (2006)
  - Total: 768
- Time zone: UTC+3:30 (IRST)

Hajj Yadollah Mahalleh (Persian: حاج يداله محله, also Romanized as Ḩājj Yadollāh Maḩalleh; also known as Ḩājj Yadollāh Maḩalleh-ye Chūbar and Ḩāj Yadollāh Maḩalleh-ye Chūbar) is a neighborhood in the city of Chubar in Haviq District of Talesh County, Gilan Province, Iran.

Formerly, it was a village in Chubar Rural District. At the 2006 census, its population was 768, in 188 families. It was incorporated into Chubar city between 2006 and 2011.
