= Suli Mahalleh =

Suli Mahalleh صولی محله
- Neighborhood
- Location within Iran
- Coordinates: 38°09′15″N 48°53′50″E
- Country: Iran
- Province: Gilan
- County: Talesh
- Bakhsh: Haviq
- City: Haviq

Population (2006)
  - Total: 465
- Time zone: UTC+3:30 (IRST)

Suli Mahalleh (Persian: صولی محله, also Romanized as Şūlī Maḩalleh and Sūlī Maḩalleh; also known as Sūlī Maḩalleh-ye Ḩavīq) is a neighborhood in the northeastern part of Haviq city in Haviq District of Talesh County, Gilan Province, Iran.

It was formerly a village in Haviq Rural District. At the 2006 census, its population was 465, in 98 families. It was incorporated into Haviq city between 2006 and 2011.
