= Lalakah Mahalleh =

Lalakah Mahalleh للكه محله
- Village
- Location within Iran
- Coordinates: 38°11′09″N 48°53′27″E
- Country: Iran
- Province: Gilan
- County: Talesh
- Bakhsh: Haviq
- City: Chubar

Population (2006)
  - Total: 2,713
- Time zone: UTC+3:30 (IRST)

Lalakah Mahalleh (Persian: للكه محله, also Romanized as Lalakah Maḩalleh; also known as Lalakah Maḩalleh-ye Chūbar) is a neighborhood in the city of Chubar in Haviq District of Talesh County, Gilan Province, Iran.

Formerly, it was a village in Chubar Rural District. At the 2006 census, its population was 2,713, in 615 families. It became part of Chubar city's urban area between 2006 and 2011.
