= Aghasi =

Aghasi آغاسی
- Village
- Location within Iran
- Coordinates: 37°55′41″N 48°55′04″E
- Country: Iran
- Province: Gilan
- County: Talesh
- Bakhsh: Haviq
- Rural District: Haviq

Population (2016)
  - Total: 217
- Time zone: UTC+3:30 (IRST)

Aghasi (Persian: آغاسی, also Romanized as Āghāsī; also known as Āghāsī Maḩalleh) is a village in Haviq Rural District, Haviq District, Talesh County, Gilan Province, Iran. It is a western suburb of Haviq city.

At the time of the 2006 National Census, the village's population was 248 in 48 households. The following census in 2011 counted 103 people in 25 households. The 2016 census measured the population of the village as 217 people in 65 households.
