= Vanistan =

Vanistan ونيستان
- Village
- Location within Iran
- Coordinates: 38°11′00″N 48°49′00″E
- Country: Iran
- Province: Gilan
- County: Talesh
- Bakhsh: Haviq
- Rural District: Chubar

Population (2006)
  - Total: 70
- Time zone: UTC+3:30 (IRST)
  - Summer (DST): UTC+4:30 (IRDT)

Vanistan (Persian: ونيستان, also Romanized as Vanīstān; also known as Vanīstān-e Chūbar) is a village in Chubar Rural District, Haviq District, Talesh County, Gilan Province, Iran. At the 2006 census, its population was 70, in 17 families.
