= Vosi =

Vosi وسي
- Village
- Location within Iran
- Coordinates: 38°10′00″N 48°48′00″E
- Country: Iran
- Province: Gilan
- County: Talesh
- Bakhsh: Haviq
- Rural District: Chubar

Population (2006)
  - Total: 107
- Time zone: UTC+3:30 (IRST)
  - Summer (DST): UTC+4:30 (IRDT)

Vosi (Persian: وسي, also Romanized as Vosī; also known as Vosī-ye Chūbar) is a village in Chubar Rural District, Haviq District, Talesh County, Gilan Province, Iran. At the 2006 census, its population was 107, in 23 families.
