= Takhteh Puri =

Takhteh Puri تخته پوري
- Village
- Location within Iran
- Coordinates: 38°11′46″N 48°52′21″E
- Country: Iran
- Province: Gilan
- County: Talesh
- Bakhsh: Haviq
- Rural District: Chubar

Population (2006)
  - Total: 166
- Time zone: UTC+3:30 (IRST)
  - Summer (DST): UTC+4:30 (IRDT)

Takhteh Puri (Persian: تخته پوري, also Romanized as Takhteh Pūrī) is a village in Chubar Rural District, Haviq District, Talesh County, Gilan Province, Iran. At the 2006 census, its population was 166, in 37 families.
