= Geruf =

Geruf گروف
- Village
- Location within Iran
- Coordinates: 38°14′15″N 48°45′31″E
- Country: Iran
- Province: Gilan
- County: Talesh
- Bakhsh: Haviq
- Rural District: Chubar

Population (2006)
  - Total: 114
- Time zone: UTC+3:30 (IRST)
  - Summer (DST): UTC+4:30 (IRDT)

Geruf (Persian: گروف, also Romanized as Gerūf) is a village in Chubar Rural District, Haviq District, Talesh County, Gilan Province, Iran. At the 2006 census, its population was 114, in 26 families.
