= Kachum Mahalleh =

Kachum Mahalleh كچوم محله
- Village
- Country: Iran
- Province: Gilan
- County: Talesh
- Bakhsh: Haviq
- Rural District: Chubar

Population (2006)
  - Total: 32
- Time zone: UTC+3:30 (IRST)
  - Summer (DST): UTC+4:30 (IRDT)

Kachum Mahalleh (Persian: كچوم محله, also Romanized as Kachūm Maḩalleh) is a village in Chubar Rural District, Haviq District, Talesh County, Gilan Province, Iran. At the 2006 census, its population was 32, in 5 families.
