= Sardab Huni =

Sardab Huni سرداب هوني
- Village
- Location within Iran
- Coordinates: 38°13′55″N 48°46′30″E
- Country: Iran
- Province: Gilan
- County: Talesh
- Bakhsh: Haviq
- Rural District: Chubar

Population (2006)
  - Total: 38
- Time zone: UTC+3:30 (IRST)
  - Summer (DST): UTC+4:30 (IRDT)

Sardab Huni (Persian: سرداب هوني, also Romanized as Sardāb Hūnī; also known as Sardāhūnī-ye Vīznah and Sardūnī) is a village in Chubar Rural District, Haviq District, Talesh County, Gilan Province, Iran. At the 2006 census, its population was 38, in 12 families.
