= Ilkufi =

Ilkufi ايلكوفي
- Village
- Location within Iran
- Coordinates: 38°09′00″N 48°48′00″E
- Country: Iran
- Province: Gilan
- County: Talesh
- Bakhsh: Haviq
- Rural District: Chubar

Population (2006)
  - Total: 194
- Time zone: UTC+3:30 (IRST)
  - Summer (DST): UTC+4:30 (IRDT)

Ilkufi (Persian: ايلكوفي, also Romanized as Īlkūfī; also known as Elkūfeh and Īlkūfī-ye Chūbar) is a village in Chubar Rural District, Haviq District, Talesh County, Gilan Province, Iran. At the 2006 census, its population was 194, in 50 families.
