= Chaleh Bijar =

Chaleh Bijar چاله بيجار
- Village
- Location within Iran
- Coordinates: 38°13′28″N 48°51′06″E
- Country: Iran
- Province: Gilan
- County: Talesh
- Bakhsh: Haviq
- Rural District: Chubar

Population (2006)
  - Total: 378
- Time zone: UTC+3:30 (IRST)
  - Summer (DST): UTC+4:30 (IRDT)

Chaleh Bijar (Persian: چاله بيجار, also Romanized as Chāleh Bījār; also known as Chāleh Bījār-e Lemīr) is a village in Chubar Rural District, Haviq District, Talesh County, Gilan Province, Iran. At the 2006 census, its population was 378, in 85 families.
