= Kashbil =

Kashbil كش بيل
- Village
- Location within Iran
- Coordinates: 38°09′29″N 48°52′34″E
- Country: Iran
- Province: Gilan
- County: Talesh
- Bakhsh: Haviq
- Rural District: Chubar

Population (2006)
  - Total: 250
- Time zone: UTC+3:30 (IRST)
  - Summer (DST): UTC+4:30 (IRDT)

Kashbil (Persian: كش بيل, also Romanized as Kashbīl; also known as Kashbīl-e Ḩavīq) is a village in Chubar Rural District, Haviq District, Talesh County, Gilan Province, Iran. At the 2006 census, its population was 250, in 52 families.

== Language ==
Linguistic composition of the village.

Kashbil linguistic composition
language	percent
Azerbaijani	80%
Talysh	15%
New Persian	5%
