= Henzeni-ye Bala =

Henzeni-ye Bala هنزنی بالا
- Village
- Location within Iran
- Coordinates: 38°06′58″N 48°51′10″E
- Country: Iran
- Province: Gilan
- County: Talesh
- Bakhsh: Haviq
- Rural District: Haviq

Population (2006)
  - Total: 17
- Time zone: UTC+3:30 (IRST)

Henzeni-ye Bala (Persian: هنزنی بالا, also Romanized as Henzenī-ye Bālā; also known as Bālā Henzenī) is a village in Haviq Rural District, Haviq District, Talesh County, Gilan Province, Iran. It is west of Henzeni village in the Talysh Mountains.

At the 2006 census, its population was 17, in 6 families. The following census in 2011 reported no permanent population, stating that it is populated from May to October. The 2016 census measured the permanent population of the village as less than 4 households.
