= Khudkar Mahalleh =

Khudkar Mahalleh خودكارمحله
- Village
- Country: Iran
- Province: Gilan
- County: Talesh
- Bakhsh: Haviq
- Rural District: Chubar

Population (2006)
  - Total: 103
- Time zone: UTC+3:30 (IRST)
  - Summer (DST): UTC+4:30 (IRDT)

Khudkar Mahalleh (Persian: خودكارمحله, also Romanized as Khūdkār Maḩalleh) is a village in Chubar Rural District, Haviq District, Talesh County, Gilan Province, Iran. At the 2006 census, its population was 103, in 21 families.

== Language ==
Linguistic composition of the village.

Khudkar Mahalleh linguistic composition
language	percent
Azerbaijani	100%
