= Meskin =

Meskin may refer to:

- Aharon Meskin, Israeli actor
- Meskin, Gilan, a village in Gilan Province, Iran
- Boneh-ye Meskin, a village in Khuzestan Province, Iran
- Meskin, Sistan and Baluchestan, a village in Sistan and Baluchestan Province, Iran
- Meskin, West Azerbaijan, a village in West Azerbaijan Province, Iran
- Mort Meskin, American comic book artist
