= Shad Galdi Mahalleh =

Shad Galdi Mahalleh شادگلدي محله
- Village
- Location within Iran
- Coordinates: 38°10′32″N 48°51′53″E
- Country: Iran
- Province: Gilan
- County: Talesh
- Bakhsh: Haviq
- Rural District: Chubar

Population (2006)
  - Total: 141
- Time zone: UTC+3:30 (IRST)
  - Summer (DST): UTC+4:30 (IRDT)

Shad Galdi Mahalleh (Persian: شادگلدي محله, also Romanized as Shād Galdī Maḩalleh; also known as Shāh Galdī Maḩalleh) is a village in Chubar Rural District, Haviq District, Talesh County, Gilan Province, Iran. At the 2006 census, its population was 141, in 32 families.
