= Hileh Sara =

Hileh Sara حيله سرا
- Village
- Location within Iran
- Coordinates: 38°15′00″N 48°53′00″E
- Country: Iran
- Province: Gilan
- County: Talesh
- Bakhsh: Haviq
- Rural District: Chubar

Population (2006)
  - Total: 333
- Time zone: UTC+3:30 (IRST)
  - Summer (DST): UTC+4:30 (IRDT)

Hileh Sara (Persian: حيله سرا, also Romanized as Ḩīleh Sarā; also known as Heleh Sarāy and Heleh Sarā-ye Lemīr) is a village in Chubar Rural District, Haviq District, Talesh County, Gilan Province, Iran. At the 2006 census, its population was 333, in 75 families.
