= Rik-e Haviq =

Rik-e Haviq ریک حویق
- Village
- Location within Iran
- Coordinates: 38°08′14″N 48°53′38″E
- Country: Iran
- Province: Gilan
- County: Talesh
- Bakhsh: Haviq
- Rural District: Haviq

Population (2016)
  - Total: 308
- Time zone: UTC+3:30 (IRST)

Rik-e Haviq (Persian: ریک حویق, also Romanized as Rīk-e Ḩavīq; also known as Rīk, Rīk-e Noşratābād, and Rīk Maḩalleh-ye Ḩavīq) is a village in Haviq Rural District, Haviq District, Talesh County, Gilan Province, Iran. It is a southern suburb of Haviq city.

At the 2016 census, its population was 308, in 90 families. This represented a large decrease from 924 people in 2006.
