= Anovi =

Takhtepuri
- Village
- Location within Iran
- Coordinates: 38°11′46″N 48°52′21″E
- Country: Iran
- Province: Gilan
- County: Talesh
- Bakhsh: Haviq
- Rural District: Chubar

Population (2006)
  - Total: 345
- Time zone: UTC+3:30 (IRST)
  - Summer (DST): UTC+4:30 (IRDT)

Takhtepuri (Persian: تخته پوری, also Romanized as ʿTakhtepuri; also known as Takhtepuri Village, chobar, and Takhtepurie chobar ) is a village in Chubar Rural District, Haviq District, Talesh County, Gilan Province, Iran. At the 2006 census, its population was 345, in 78 families.
