= Lishki =

Lishki ليشكي
- Village
- Country: Iran
- Province: Gilan
- County: Talesh
- Bakhsh: Haviq
- Rural District: Chubar

Population (2006)
  - Total: 20
- Time zone: UTC+3:30 (IRST)
  - Summer (DST): UTC+4:30 (IRDT)

Lishki (Persian: ليشكي, also Romanized as Līshkī) is a village in Chubar Rural District, Haviq District, Talesh County, Gilan Province, Iran. At the 2006 census, its population was 20, in 5 families.

The main attraction of the village is a mansion, built in the late 19th century. This manor house is an architectural monument of the XIX century.
