= Motla Dasht =

Motla Dasht متلادشت
- Village
- Country: Iran
- Province: Gilan
- County: Talesh
- Bakhsh: Haviq
- Rural District: Chubar

Population (2006)
  - Total: 97
- Time zone: UTC+3:30 (IRST)
  - Summer (DST): UTC+4:30 (IRDT)

Motla Dasht (Persian: متلادشت, also Romanized as Motlā Dasht) is a village in Chubar Rural District, Haviq District, Talesh County, Gilan Province, Iran. At the 2006 census, its population was 97, in 24 families.
