= Moharrum Zumeh =

Moharrum Zumeh محروم زومه
- Village
- Location within Iran
- Coordinates: 38°14′00″N 48°53′00″E
- Country: Iran
- Province: Gilan
- County: Talesh
- Bakhsh: Haviq
- Rural District: Chubar

Population (2006)
  - Total: 404
- Time zone: UTC+3:30 (IRST)
  - Summer (DST): UTC+4:30 (IRDT)

Moharrum Zumeh (Persian: محروم زومه, also Romanized as Moḩarrūm Zūmeh; also known as Moḩarram Zūmeh) is a village in Chubar Rural District, Haviq District, Talesh County, Gilan Province, Iran. At the 2006 census, its population was 404, in 85 families.
