= Kohneh Hayyat =

Kohneh Hayyat كهنه حياط
- Village
- Country: Iran
- Province: Gilan
- County: Talesh
- Bakhsh: Haviq
- Rural District: Chubar

Population (2006)
  - Total: 115
- Time zone: UTC+3:30 (IRST)
  - Summer (DST): UTC+4:30 (IRDT)

Kohneh Hayyat (Persian: كهنه حياط, also Romanized as Kohneh Ḩayyāṭ) is a village in Chubar Rural District, Haviq District, Talesh County, Gilan Province, Iran. At the 2006 census, its population was 115, in 22 families.

== Language ==
Linguistic composition of the village.

Kohne Hayyat linguistic composition
language	percent
Azerbaijani	100%
