= Kuh-e Bon, Gilan =

Kubn کوه بن
- Village
- Country: Iran
- Province: Gilan
- County: Talesh
- Bakhsh: Haviq
- Rural District: Chubar

Population (2006)
  - Total: 17
- Time zone: UTC+3:30 (IRST)
  - Summer (DST): UTC+4:30 (IRDT)

KuBN (Persian: کوه بن, also Romanized as Kūh-e Bon) is a village in Chubar Rural District, Haviq District, Talesh County, Gilan Province, Iran. At the 2006 census, its population was 17, in 6 families.
