= Masjed-e Qabaqi =

Masjed-e Qabaqi مسجدقباقي
- Village
- Location within Iran
- Coordinates: 38°10′14″N 48°52′05″E
- Country: Iran
- Province: Gilan
- County: Talesh
- Bakhsh: Haviq
- Rural District: Chubar

Population (2006)
  - Total: 459
- Time zone: UTC+3:30 (IRST)
  - Summer (DST): UTC+4:30 (IRDT)

Masjed-e Qabaqi (Persian: مسجدقباقي, also Romanized as Masjed-e Qabāqī) is a village in Chubar Rural District, Haviq District, Talesh County, Gilan Province, Iran. At the 2006 census, its population was 459, in 100 families.
