= Yeylaq-e Viznah =

Yeylaq-e Viznah ييلاق ويزنه
- Village
- Location within Iran
- Coordinates: 38°14′23″N 48°47′22″E
- Country: Iran
- Province: Gilan
- County: Talesh
- Bakhsh: Haviq
- Rural District: Chubar

Population (2006)
  - Total: 33
- Time zone: UTC+3:30 (IRST)
  - Summer (DST): UTC+4:30 (IRDT)

Yeylaq-e Viznah (Persian: ييلاق ويزنه, also Romanized as Yeylāq-e Vīznah; also known as Vīznah) is a village in Chubar Rural District, Haviq District, Talesh County, Gilan Province, Iran. At the 2006 census, its population was 33, in 6 families.
