= Khalajlar =

Village in Gilan province, Iran

Khalajlar Persian: خلج لر
- Village
- Location within Iran
- Coordinates: 38°12′28″N 48°53′12″E
- Country: Iran
- Province: Gilan
- County: Talesh
- District: Haviq
- Rural District: Chubar

Population (2016)
  - Total: 986
- Time zone: UTC+3:30 (IRST)

Khalajlar (Persian: خلج لر) is a village in Chubar Rural District of Haviq District in Talesh County, Gilan province, Iran.

== Demographics ==
=== Population ===
At the time of the 2006 National Census, the village's population was 430 in 99 households. The following census in 2011 counted 456 people in 127 households. The 2016 census measured the population of the village as 986 people in 291 households.
