= Lenza =

Lenza لنزا
- Village
- Interactive map of Lenza
- Coordinates: 38.083°N 48.702°E
- Country: Iran
- Province: Gilan
- County: Talesh
- Bakhsh: Haviq
- Rural District: Haviq

Population (2006)
  - Total: 25
- Time zone: UTC+3:30 (IRST)

Lenza (Persian: لنزا, also Romanized as Lenzā) is a yaylak and village in Haviq Rural District, Haviq District, Talesh County, Gilan Province, Iran.

At the 2006 census, its population was 25, in 5 families. The following census results in 2011 and 2016 counted no permanent households, with villagers residing there from May to October.
