= Zomori =

Zomori زمری
- Village
- Location within Iran
- Coordinates: 38°07′00″N 48°49′00″E
- Country: Iran
- Province: Gilan
- County: Talesh
- Bakhsh: Haviq
- Rural District: Haviq

Population (2016)
  - Total: 95
- Time zone: UTC+3:30 (IRST)

Zomori (Persian: زمری, also Romanized as Zomorī) is a village in Haviq Rural District, Haviq District, Talesh County, Gilan Province, Iran.

At the time of the 2006 National Census, the village's population was 93 in 23 households. The following census in 2011 counted 106 people in 24 households. The 2016 census measured the population of the village as 95 people in 24 households.
