= Meskin, Gilan =

Meskin مسكين
- Village
- Location within Iran
- Coordinates: 38°14′07″N 48°45′11″E
- Country: Iran
- Province: Gilan
- County: Talesh
- Bakhsh: Haviq
- Rural District: Chubar

Population (2006)
  - Total: 61
- Time zone: UTC+3:30 (IRST)
  - Summer (DST): UTC+4:30 (IRDT)

Meskin (Persian: مسكين, also Romanized as Meskīn; also known as Meskīn-e Vīznah) is a village in Chubar Rural District, Haviq District, Talesh County, Gilan Province, Iran. At the 2006 census, its population was 61, in 12 families.
