= Helis =

Helis هليس
- Village
- Location within Iran
- Coordinates: 38°05′32″N 48°53′10″E
- Country: Iran
- Province: Gilan
- County: Talesh
- Bakhsh: Haviq
- Rural District: Haviq

Population (2016)
  - Total: 473
- Time zone: UTC+3:30 (IRST)

Helis (Persian: هليس, also Romanized as Helīs; also known as Helīs Maḩalleh and Helīs Maḩalleh-ye Shīrābād) is a village in Haviq Rural District, Haviq District, Talesh County, Gilan Province, Iran.

At the time of the 2006 National Census, the village's population was 308 in 78 households. The following census in 2011 counted 449 people in 126 households. The 2016 census measured the population of the village as 473 people in 154 households.
