= Darvar Mahalleh =

Village in Gilan province, Iran

Darvar Mahalleh Persian: دروارمحله
- Village
- Location within Iran
- Coordinates: 38°09′54″N 48°52′36″E
- Country: Iran
- Province: Gilan
- County: Talesh
- District: Haviq
- Rural District: Chubar

Population (2016)
  - Total: 591
- Time zone: UTC+3:30 (IRST)

Darvar Mahalleh (Persian: دروارمحله) (Note: Also romanized as Darvār Maḩalleh; also known as Darreh Vārī and Darrehvār Maḩalleh-ye Chūbar) is a village in Chubar Rural District of Haviq District in Talesh County, Gilan province, Iran.

== Demographics ==
=== Language ===
Linguistic composition of the village.

Darvar Mahalleh linguistic composition
language	percent
Azerbaijani	100%

=== Population ===
At the time of the 2006 National Census, the village's population was 425 in 91 households. The following census in 2011 counted 483 people in 119 households. The 2016 census measured the population of the village as 591 people in 180 households.
