= Roku, Iran =

Roku ركو
- Village
- Location within Iran
- Coordinates: 38°15′47″N 48°52′15″E
- Country: Iran
- Province: Gilan
- County: Talesh
- Bakhsh: Haviq
- Rural District: Chubar

Population (2006)
  - Total: 258
- Time zone: UTC+3:30 (IRST)
  - Summer (DST): UTC+4:30 (IRDT)

Roku (Persian: ركو, also Romanized as Rokū; also known as Row Kūh and Rūd Kūh) is a village in Chubar Rural District, Haviq District, Talesh County, Gilan Province, Iran. At the 2006 census, its population was 258, in 58 families.
