= Herandan =

Village in Gilan province, Iran

Herandan Persian: هرندان
- Village
- Location within Iran
- Coordinates: 38°07′17″N 48°53′31″E
- Country: Iran
- Province: Gilan
- County: Talesh
- District: Haviq
- Rural District: Haviq

Population (2016)
  - Total: 2,971
- Time zone: UTC+3:30 (IRST)

Herandan (Persian: هرندان) (Note: Also romanized as Harāndān and Herāndān) is a village in Haviq Rural District (Note: Formerly Kargan Rud Rural District) of Haviq District in Talesh County, Gilan province, Iran.

== Demographics ==
=== Population ===
At the time of the 2006 National Census, the village's population was 2,576 in 611 households. The following census in 2011 counted 2,964 people in 793 households. The 2016 census measured the population of the village as 2,971 people in 837 households. It was the most populous village in its rural district.
