= Shirabad, Gilan =

Village in Gilan province, Iran

Shirabad Persian: شیرآباد
- Village
- Location within Iran
- Coordinates: 38°06′05″N 48°54′19″E
- Country: Iran
- Province: Gilan
- County: Talesh
- District: Haviq
- Rural District: Haviq

Population (2016)
  - Total: 832
- Time zone: UTC+3:30 (IRST)

Shirabad (Persian: شیرآباد) (Note: Also romanized as Shīrābād) is a village in Haviq Rural District (Note: Formerly Kargan Rud Rural District) of Haviq District in Talesh County, Gilan province, Iran. Shirabad is known for its rice and kiwifruit. Kiwifruit was introduced by Bahman Jalili and for his dedicated hard work received the certified reward from Iranian government's Department of Agriculture.

== Demographics ==
=== Population ===
At the time of the 2006 National Census, the village's population was 672 in 169 households. The following census in 2011 counted 701 people in 212 households. The 2016 census measured the population of the village as 832 people in 265 households.
