= Shirabad Mahalleh =

Village in Gilan province, Iran

Shirabad Mahalleh Persian: شیرآبادمحله
- Village
- Location within Iran
- Coordinates: 38°05′26″N 48°53′17″E
- Country: Iran
- Province: Gilan
- County: Talesh
- District: Haviq
- Rural District: Haviq

Population (2016)
  - Total: 585
- Time zone: UTC+3:30 (IRST)

Shirabad Mahalleh (Persian: شیرآبادمحله) (Note: Also romanized as Shīrābād Maḩalleh) is a village in Haviq Rural District (Note: Formerly Kargan Rud Rural District) of Haviq District in Talesh County, Gilan province, Iran.

== Demographics ==
=== Population ===
At the time of the 2006 National Census, the village's population was 550 in 140 households. The following census in 2011 counted 600 people in 167 households. The 2016 census measured the population of the village as 585 people in 189 households.
