= Owtar, Haviq =

Owtar اوتار
- Village
- Location within Iran
- Coordinates: 38°09′34″N 48°53′21″E
- Country: Iran
- Province: Gilan
- County: Talesh
- Bakhsh: Haviq
- Rural District: Haviq

Population (2016)
  - Total: 90
- Time zone: UTC+3:30 (IRST)

Owtar (Persian: اوتار, also Romanized as Owtār; also known as Ūtār Maḩalleh-ye Ḩavīq) is a village in Haviq Rural District, Haviq District, Talesh County, Gilan Province, Iran. It is a northern suburb of Haviq city.

At the time of the 2006 National Census, the village's population was 462 in 108 households. The following census in 2011 counted 43 people in 10 households, as parts of the village was incorporated into Haviq city. The 2016 census measured the population of the village as 90 people in 27 households.
