= Lamir =

Lamir or Lemir or Lomir (Persian: لمير) may refer to:

- Lamir, Ardabil
- Lemir, Ardabil
- Lamir, Talesh, Gilan Province
- Lamir-e Sofla, Asalem District, Talesh County, Gilan Province
- Lemir, Haviq, Talesh County, Gilan Province
