= Mazhdeh Ali =

Mazhdeh Ali مژده علي
- Village
- Interactive map of Mazhdeh Ali
- Coordinates: 38.124°N 48.807°E
- Country: Iran
- Province: Gilan
- County: Talesh
- Bakhsh: Haviq
- Rural District: Haviq

Population (2006)
  - Total: 122
- Time zone: UTC+3:30 (IRST)

Mazhdeh Ali (Persian: مژده علي, also Romanized as Mazhdeh ʿAlī) is a village in Haviq Rural District, Haviq District, Talesh County, Gilan Province, Iran.

At the time of the 2006 National Census, the village's population was 122 in 30 households. The following census in 2011 counted 53 people in 19 households. The 2016 census measured the population of the village as 73 people in 18 households.
