= Bagheshlu Mahalleh =

Village in Gilan province, Iran

Bagheshlu Mahalleh Persian: باغشلومحله
- Village
- Location within Iran
- Coordinates: 38°08′39″N 48°52′12″E
- Country: Iran
- Province: Gilan
- County: Talesh
- District: Haviq
- Rural District: Haviq

Population (2016)
  - Total: 558
- Time zone: UTC+3:30 (IRST)

Bagheshlu Mahalleh (Persian: باغشلومحله) (Note: Also romanized as Bāgheshlū Maḩalleh; also known as Bāghemsheh Maḩalleh and Bāghesh Maḩalleh-ye Ḩavīq) is a village in Haviq Rural District (Note: Formerly Kargan Rud Rural District) of Haviq District in Talesh County, Gilan province, Iran.

== Demographics ==
=== Language ===
Linguistic composition of the village.

Bagheshlu Mahalleh linguistic composition
language	percent
Azerbaijani	100%

=== Population ===
At the time of the 2006 National Census, the village's population was 523 in 110 households. The following census in 2011 counted 704 people in 182 households. The 2016 census measured the population of the village as 558 people in 162 households.
