= Sutapara =

Sutapara سوتاپارا
- Village
- Interactive map of Sutapara
- Coordinates: 38.119°N 48.794°E
- Country: Iran
- Province: Gilan
- County: Talesh
- Bakhsh: Haviq
- Rural District: Haviq

Population (2006)
  - Total: 61
- Time zone: UTC+3:30 (IRST)

Sutapara (Persian: سوتاپارا, also Romanized as Sūtāpārā) is a yaylak and village in Haviq Rural District, Haviq District, Talesh County, Gilan Province, Iran. At the 2006 census, its population was 61, in 12 families. The following census results in 2011 and 2016 counted no permanent households, with villagers residing there from May to October.
