= Lemir, Haviq =

Lemir لمير
- Village
- Location within Iran
- Coordinates: 38°13′46″N 48°53′11″E
- Country: Iran
- Province: Gilan
- County: Talesh
- Bakhsh: Haviq
- Rural District: Chubar

Population (2006)
  - Total: 566
- Time zone: UTC+3:30 (IRST)
  - Summer (DST): UTC+4:30 (IRDT)

Lemir (Persian: لمير, also Romanized as Lemīr and Lomīr; also known as Līmir, Lamierre, and Lombar) is a village in Chubar Rural District, Haviq District, Talesh County, Gilan Province, Iran. At the 2006 census, its population was 566, in 113 families.
