= Seydgah-e Haviq =

Seydgah-e Haviq (Haviq fishing place) صيدگاه حويق
- Neighborhood
- Location within Iran
- Coordinates: 38°09′14″N 48°54′49″E
- Country: Iran
- Province: Gilan
- County: Talesh
- Bakhsh: Haviq
- City: Haviq

Population (2006)
  - Total: 626
- Time zone: UTC+3:30 (IRST)

Seydgah-e Haviq (Persian: صيدگاه حويق, also Romanized as Şeydgāh-e Ḩavīq) is a neighboehood in the city of Haviq in Haviq District of Talesh County, Gilan Province, Iran.

At the 2006 census, its population was 626, in 127 families. It was later incorporated into Haviq city.
