= Motal Sara =

Village in Gilan province, Iran

Motal Sara Persian: مطالع سرا
- Village
- Location within Iran
- Coordinates: 38°13′12″N 48°51′24″E
- Country: Iran
- Province: Gilan
- County: Talesh
- District: Haviq
- Rural District: Chubar

Population (2016)
  - Total: 632
- Time zone: UTC+3:30 (IRST)

Motal Sara (Persian: مطالع سرا) (Note: Also romanized as Moţalʿ Sarā; also known as Moţallā Sarā-ye Lemīr) is a village in Chubar Rural District of Haviq District in Talesh County, Gilan province, Iran.

== Demographics ==
=== Population ===
At the time of the 2006 National Census, the village's population was 568 in 123 households. The following census in 2011 counted 561 people in 163 households. The 2016 census measured the population of the village as 632 people in 176 households.
