= Owtar Mahalleh-ye Shirabad =

Village in Gilan province, Iran

Owtar Mahalleh-ye Shirabad Persian: اوتارمحله شيراباد
- Village
- Location within Iran
- Coordinates: 38°05′41″N 48°53′43″E
- Country: Iran
- Province: Gilan
- County: Talesh
- District: Haviq
- Rural District: Haviq

Population (2016)
  - Total: 531
- Time zone: UTC+3:30 (IRST)

Owtar Mahalleh-ye Shirabad (Persian: اوتارمحله شيراباد) (Note: Also romanized as Owtār Maḩalleh-ye Shīrābād and Ūtār Maḩalleh-ye Shīrābād; also known as Ownār Maḩalleh) is a village in Haviq Rural District (Note: Formerly Kargan Rud Rural District) of Haviq District in Talesh County, Gilan province, Iran.

== Demographics ==
=== Population ===
At the time of the 2006 National Census, the village's population was 503 in 135 households. The following census in 2011 counted 492 people in 132 households. The 2016 census measured the population of the village as 531 people in 168 households.
