= Palasi, Iran =

Village in Gilan province, Iran

Palasi Persian: پلاسي
- Village
- Location within Iran
- Coordinates: 38°12′15″N 48°52′09″E
- Country: Iran
- Province: Gilan
- County: Talesh
- District: Haviq
- Rural District: Chubar

Population (2016)
  - Total: 609
- Time zone: UTC+3:30 (IRST)

Palasi (Persian: پلاسي) (Note: Also romanized as Pālāsī and Palāsī) is a village in Chubar Rural District of Haviq District in Talesh County, Gilan province, Iran.

== Demographics ==
=== Language ===
Linguistic composition of the village.

Palasi linguistic composition
language	percent
Azerbaijani	100%

=== Population ===
At the time of the 2006 National Census, the village's population was 1,357 in 314 households. The following census in 2011 counted 1,181 people in 300 households. The 2016 census measured the population of the village as 609 people in 181 households.
