= Viznah =

Village in Gilan province, Iran

Viznah Persian: ويزنه
- Village
- Location within Iran
- Coordinates: 38°15′40″N 48°52′26″E
- Country: Iran
- Province: Gilan
- County: Talesh
- District: Haviq
- Rural District: Chubar

Population (2016)
  - Total: 3,022
- Time zone: UTC+3:30 (IRST)

Viznah (Persian: ویزنه) (Note: Also romanized as Vizneh) is a village in Chubar Rural District of Haviq District in Talesh County, Gilan province, Iran.

== Demographics ==
=== Population ===
At the time of the 2006 National Census, the village's population was 2,314 in 513 households. The following census in 2011 counted 2,639 people in 688 households. The 2016 census measured the population of the village as 3,022 people in 877 households. It was the most populous village in its rural district.
