= Nav, Haviq =

Nav نو
- Village
- Interactive map of Nav
- Coordinates: 38.087°N 48.75°E
- Country: Iran
- Province: Gilan
- County: Talesh
- Bakhsh: Haviq
- Rural District: Haviq

Population (2006)
  - Total: 60
- Time zone: UTC+3:30 (IRST)

Nav (Persian: نو) is a village in Haviq Rural District, Haviq District, Talesh County, Gilan Province, Iran. At the 2006 census, its population was 60, in 16 families. The following census results in 2011 and 2016 counted no permanent households, with villagers residing there from May to October.
