= Hashtaruchuni =

Hashtaruchuni هشتروچونی
- Village
- Interactive map of Hashtaruchuni
- Coordinates: 38.12°N 48.835°E
- Country: Iran
- Province: Gilan
- County: Talesh
- Bakhsh: Haviq
- Rural District: Haviq

Population (2016)
  - Total: 163
- Time zone: UTC+3:30 (IRST)

Hashtaruchuni (Persian: هشتروچونی, also Romanized as Hashtarūchūnī) is a village in Haviq Rural District, Haviq District, Talesh County, Gilan Province, Iran. At the 2006 census, its population was 166, in 31 families.

At the time of the 2006 National Census, the village's population was 166 in 31 households. The following census in 2011 counted 151 people in 37 households. The 2016 census measured the population of the village as 163 people in 46 households.
