= Seyyed Mahalleh =

Seyyed Mahalleh (Persian: سيدمحله) may refer to:

- Seyyed Mahalleh, Lahijan, Gilan Province
- Seyyed Mahalleh, Masal, Gilan Province
- Seyyed Mahalleh, Talesh, Gilan Province
- Seyyed Mahalleh, Abbasabad, Mazandaran Province
- Seyyed Mahalleh, Babolsar, Mazandaran Province
- Seyyed Mahalleh, Sari, Mazandaran Province
- Seyyed Mahalleh, Tehran
