= Babalu Mahalleh =

Village in Gilan province, Iran

Babalu Mahalleh Persian: بابالومحله
- Village
- Location within Iran
- Country: Iran
- Province: Gilan
- County: Talesh
- District: Haviq
- Rural District: Haviq

Population (2016)
  - Total: 715
- Time zone: UTC+3:30 (IRST)

Babalu Mahalleh (Persian: بابالومحله) (Note: Also romanized as Bābālū Maḩalleh; also known as Bābālū and Bābālū Maḩalleh-ye Ḩavīq) is a village in Haviq Rural District (Note: Formerly Kargan Rud Rural District) of Haviq District in Talesh County, Gilan province, Iran.

== Demographics ==
=== Language ===
Linguistic composition of the village.

Babalu Mahalleh linguistic composition
language	percent
Azerbaijani	100%

=== Population ===
At the time of the 2006 National Census, the village's population was 463 in 80 households. The following census in 2011 counted 607 people in 162 households. The 2016 census measured the population of the village as 715 people in 200 households.
