= Sholoqun =

Village in Gilan province, Iran

Sholoqun Persian: شلقون
- Village
- Location within Iran
- Coordinates: 38°14′52″N 48°51′28″E
- Country: Iran
- Province: Gilan
- County: Talesh
- District: Haviq
- Rural District: Chubar

Population (2016)
  - Total: 851
- Time zone: UTC+3:30 (IRST)

Sholoqun (Persian: شلقون) (Note: Also romanized as Sholoqūn; also known as Sholoqūn-e Vīznah, Sholoqūn-e Vīztah, and Shūlūqūn) is a village in Chubar Rural District of Haviq District in Talesh County, Gilan province, Iran.

== Demographics ==
=== Population ===
At the time of the 2006 National Census, the village's population was 845 in 192 households. The following census in 2011 counted 859 people in 216 households. The 2016 census measured the population of the village as 851 people in 253 households.
