= Khalileh Sara, Talesh =

Village in Gilan province, Iran

Khalileh Sara Persian: خليله سرا
- Village
- Location within Iran
- Coordinates: 38°08′24″N 48°51′42″E
- Country: Iran
- Province: Gilan
- County: Talesh
- District: Haviq
- Rural District: Haviq

Population (2016)
  - Total: 518
- Time zone: UTC+3:30 (IRST)

Khalileh Sara (Persian: خليله سرا) (Note: Also romanized as Khalīleh Sarā; also known as Khalīl Ḩayāţī-ye Maḩalleh and Khalīl Sarā-ye Ḩavīq) is a village in Haviq Rural District (Note: Formerly Kargan Rud Rural District) of Haviq District in Talesh County, Gilan province, Iran.

== Demographics ==
=== Population ===
At the time of the 2006 National Census, the village's population was 447 in 80 households. The following census in 2011 counted 463 people in 131 households. The 2016 census measured the population of the village as 518 people in 150 households.
