= Bijarabin =

Bijarabin or Bijar Bin (Persian: بيجاربين) may refer to:

- Bijarabin, Astara
- Bijar Bin, Talesh
