= Sefid Sangan, Talesh =

Village in Gilan province, Iran

Sefid Sangan Persian: سفيدسنگان
- Village
- Location within Iran
- Coordinates: 38°13′55″N 48°51′43″E
- Country: Iran
- Province: Gilan
- County: Talesh
- District: Haviq
- Rural District: Chubar

Population (2016)
  - Total: 597
- Time zone: UTC+3:30 (IRST)

Sefid Sangan (Persian: سفيدسنگان) (Note: Also romanized as Sefīd Sangān; also known as Sefīd Sangān-e Lemīr) is a village in Chubar Rural District of Haviq District in Talesh County, Gilan province, Iran.

== History ==
On 12 May 2020, Reza Ashrafi killed his daughter Romina Ashrafi in a so-called "honor killing."

== Demographics ==
=== Population ===
At the time of the 2006 National Census, the village's population was 462 in 99 households. The following census in 2011 counted 557 people in 147 households. The 2016 census measured the population of the village as 597 people in 173 households.
