= Roku (disambiguation) =

Roku is a set-top streaming video player.

Roku may also refer to:

- Roku, Iran, a village in Iran
- Roku, the number six in Japanese numerals
- Roku, a character in the animated television series Avatar: The Last Airbender
- Roku, Inc., the electronics company that manufactures the Roku player

== See also ==
- RockYou, an American advertising company
