= Killing of Tiba al-Ali =

2023 honour killing in Iraq

Murder of Tiba al-Ali
- Location: Al-Qādisiyyah Governorate, Iraq
- Date: 31 January 2023; 3 years ago
- Attack type: Honor killing
- Deaths: 1
- Victim: Tiba al-Ali
- Perpetrator: Tayyip Ali
- Criminal information
- Penalty: Six months imprisonment

On 31 January 2023, Tiba al-Ali, an Iraqi Youtube influencer, was killed in Iraq in an apparent honour killing by her father.

Tiba al-Ali was born in Iraq in 2000 and moved to Turkey in 2017. She and her fiancé frequently made videos on YouTube about life in Istanbul. She visited her family in the central Iraqi city of Al Diwaniyah, Al-Qādisiyyah Governorate, in 2023, where on 31 January she was strangled at night while sleeping. Her father, who objected to her living in Turkey, confessed to police that he was responsible for the murder. There are no laws in Iraq that prohibit domestic violence. Many media outlets have described it as a so-called honour killing.

In February, protests against the killing took place in Iraq. Activists gathered to demand a law against domestic violence and to bring attention to the issue of rising violence against women in the country.

In April 2023, Tiba's father, Tayyip Ali, was given a six-month jail sentence. General Saad Mann of the Iraqi Interior Ministry explained to the BBC that: "An accident happened to Tiba al-Ali. In the perspective of law, it is a criminal accident, and in other perspectives, it is an accident of honour killings."

== See also ==
- Murder of Romina Ashrafi
- Murder of Mona Heydari
- Babak Khorramdin
