= Bazargah =

Bazargah (Persian: بازارگه or بازرگاه or بازارگاه) may refer to:

- Bazargah, Gilan (بازارگاه - Bāzārgāh)
- Bazargah, Isfahan (بازارگاه - Bāzārgāh)
- Bazargah, Khuzestan (بازارگه - Bāzārgah)
- Bazargah, Qazvin (بازرگاه - Bāzargāh)
