= Bazargah, Gilan =

Bazargah بازارگاه
- Village
- Interactive map of Bazargah
- Coordinates: 38.075°N 48.78°E
- Country: Iran
- Province: Gilan
- County: Talesh
- Bakhsh: Haviq
- Rural District: Haviq

Population (2006)
  - Total: 17
- Time zone: UTC+3:30 (IRST)

Bazargah (Persian: بازارگاه, also Romanized as Bāzārgāh) is a yaylak and village in Haviq Rural District, Haviq District, Talesh County, Gilan Province, Iran.

At the time of the 2006 National Census, the village's population was 17 in 4 households. The following census results in 2011 and 2016 counted no permanent households, with villagers residing there from May to October.
