= Bijar Bin, Talesh =

Bijar Bin بيجاربين
- Village
- Interactive map of Bijar Bin
- Coordinates: 38.125°N 48.817°E
- Country: Iran
- Province: Gilan
- County: Talesh
- Bakhsh: Haviq
- Rural District: Haviq

Population (2016)
  - Total: 47
- Time zone: UTC+3:30 (IRST)

Bijar Bin (Persian: بيجاربين, also Romanized as Bījār Bīn) is a village in Haviq Rural District, Haviq District, Talesh County, Gilan Province, Iran.

At the time of the 2006 National Census, the village's population was 53 in 12 households. The following census in 2011 counted 42 people in 10 households. The 2016 census measured the population of the village as 47 people in 13 households.

== Language ==
Linguistic composition of the village.

Bijar Bin, Talesh linguistic composition
language	percent
Azerbaijani	100%
