= Violence against women in Iran =

Public health issue of violent acts against women in Iran

Violence against women in Iran encompasses various forms of "gender-based violence" and may include emotional, physical, sexual or mental abuse, most commonly committed by a man against a woman. Common forms of violence against women in Iran include acts such as domestic abuse, rape and murder.

Behavior, or even the threat of behavior, that is violent and based on gender and that results in physical, sexual or psychological harm and suffering to women is defined as violence against women. Under this definition, coercion and the arbitrary deprivation of liberty of women, whether occurring in public or in private life, fall within the definition of violence against women. The concept of structural violence was first proposed by Johan Galtung in 1969.

Violence against women is a phenomenon in which a woman is subjected to the use of force and the violation of her rights by the opposite sex because of her gender, simply because she is a woman. In general, any act or behavior that results in physical, sexual or psychological harm to a woman, or in her deprivation or suffering, is called violence against women. The threat of such acts and behaviors, and the deprivation of liberty whether by coercion or by choice, in personal or collective life, is also considered violence against women.

Domestic violence most often refers to a man's assault on his wife (a female intimate partner). Domestic violence against women can be defined as any gender-related act or omission that results in death, or physical, sexual or psychological harm and moral injury to women, committed by persons who are connected to them through family ties, or even without such ties, through kinship or verbal relationships, including casual relationships.

Police violence against women, including beating them on various pretexts, is a manifestation of violence against women in some countries.

== Concept ==
Violence against women is an old and relatively widespread phenomenon in all societies. "Violence against women" is a term or concept used broadly and inclusively to cover verbal abuse, intimidation, physical harassment, murder, rape and sexual assault. This form of violence is gender-based: the violence occurs precisely because of the victims' gender, in particular because the victims are women.

The United Nations defines as "violence against women" behavior, or even the threat of behavior, that is violent and gender-based and that results in physical, sexual and psychological harm and suffering to women. Under this definition, coercion and the arbitrary deprivation of liberty of women, whether occurring in public or in private life, fall within the definition of "violence against women".

Among the reasons for the emergence of this concept are changing gender roles and, consequently, changes in the position of women and in the balance of power between men and women within the family and society, which ultimately led to a re-examination of the description of women's rights. According to human rights definitions, physical violence, psychological violence, sexual violence, economic violence, state violence and social violence can be named as types of violence against women. The concept of structural violence was first proposed by Johan Galtung in 1969. In Violence, Peace, and Peace Research, Galtung writes:

When one husband beats his wife there is a clear case of personal violence, but when one million husbands keep one million wives in ignorance there is structural violence.

Systemic violence affects every aspect of women's lives, from their personal health and safety to the mental health of their children. Women who are deprived of their fundamental rights because of structural inequalities face physical harms such as unwanted pregnancies, unsafe abortions, HIV/AIDS and lifelong disabilities, as well as psychological harms such as fear, anxiety, depression, sexual dysfunction and obsessive behaviors. In fact, this violence is not a behavior directed at an individual but stems from unequal power relations between men and women, which make the exercise of such violence possible.

== Types ==
=== Police violence ===
Police violence against women in the Islamic Republic, including beating them on various pretexts, is a manifestation of violence against women in Iran.

- On Friday 16 Ordibehesht 1401 (6 May 2022), in the area of Latyan Dam, a police officer beat a woman and then, together with two other officers, forced her into a police vehicle. A video of this police violence against an Iranian woman was widely circulated on social media.

=== Femicide ===
Femicide is defined in a World Health Organization report as "the intentional murder of women because they are women". Similarly, it is defined by UN Women, the Alliance to End Violence against Women, and the Office of the United Nations High Commissioner for Human Rights as the "violent death of women for gender-related reasons". Femicide is classified as a specific type of violence against women or gender-based violence, which the United Nations in 1979 described as "a mechanism of domination, control, oppression and power over women".

Under Iranian domestic law, because the male head of the family holds guardianship over the "body and soul" of the women under his care, as father or husband, femicide carries the lightest punishments, and many men have committed femicide or killings under the pretext of honor. The father of Romina Ashrafi, who was killed on 21 May 2020 (Khordad 1399), was sentenced to only nine years' imprisonment and the payment of blood money. According to the lawyer of Romina's mother, the verdict was not unexpected. Iranian law not only fails to prohibit violence against women but, by protecting the perpetrator, systematically encourages such violence in many cases.

Data indicate a sharp upward trend in familial femicide in Iran: the organization Stop Femicide in Iran reported 93 known killings in the first half of 2024 alone, an increase of nearly 60 percent over the same period in 2023. According to the organization, there were 149 known cases in the whole of 2023, an average of nearly one killing every two days. The newspaper Etemad reported that in the first three months of the Iranian year 1403 (2024), at least 35 women and girls were killed by their male relatives, a 25 percent increase over 2023 and 59 percent over 2022, while the newspaper Shargh noted that at least 165 women had been killed by men in their families since July 2021.

Reported killings of women represent only a small fraction of actual cases in Iran, since no accurate statistics exist because of the many cases that go unreported or are wrongly reported as suicide or accidents. Every study conducted so far has shown a significant number of such killings and a continuing increase in them. The killers are mostly husbands (or ex-husbands) who use brutal methods, and the victims include women of all ages but mostly under 30, with children often witnessing the act.

==== Honor killings ====
Honor killings occur mostly in traditional societies with a patriarchal and religious culture. The perpetrators of honor killings in Iran are generally close male relatives (mahram) of the women, who commit femicide under the cover of the law, in the name of religion and the protection of gheyrat (honor). In Ordibehesht 1387 (April–May 2008), ISNA, quoting Colonel Mokhtari Fard, head of the criminal investigation police of Khuzestan province, wrote that more than 40 percent of murders in Khuzestan were honor killings. According to him, in terms of honor-killing statistics Khuzestan was second in the country after Sistan and Baluchestan province. Fereydoun Abdi, head of the Welfare Organization office in Dezful, announced that in 1397 (2018–19), 225 cases of violence against women were recorded at the social emergency service of Dezful County.

Violence against women is serious in the province, and death threats are frequent in the marginal areas of Kerman. In 1398 (2019–20), 85,420 cases of spousal abuse were recorded.

— Director-general of the Kerman Welfare Organization, Shahrvand newspaper

A descriptive-analytical study conducted in 1386 (2007–08) at the School of Public Health of Ahvaz Jundishapur University of Medical Sciences, with a sample of 1,820 women aged 14 to 56 covered by health centers in four cities (Ahvaz, Abadan, Dezful and Andimeshk), showed that the prevalence of physical violence at any time during married life was 20.2 percent, and the prevalence of psychological violence, sexual violence and any form of violence was 41, 10.9 and 47.3 percent respectively. Another study, conducted in 1394 (2015–16) by the deputy for education, research and technology of Abadan University of Medical Sciences, showed that the overall prevalence of violence was 72.3 percent, and that psychological, physical, life-threatening and sexual violence among these women were 71.7, 17.8, 8.3 and 7.1 percent respectively.

The Welfare Organization of Kerman province, in a study conducted with the help of Kerman University of Medical Sciences on violence against women in the marginal areas of Kerman, found that violence against women in these areas is high. The most common types of violence were, in order, psychological, verbal, physical, economic and sexual. Of the participants in the study, 46 percent had experienced some type of violence; of these, psychological violence accounted for 78.6 percent, physical for 55.6 percent, sexual for 28.6 percent and economic for 34.7 percent.

Establishment of safe houses

Kerman is one of the provinces in which a shelter for women who have experienced violence has been established, and in the whole country 33 safe houses have been built in various cities. These houses serve as centers for women at risk of violence, for women who face problems in society and in their personal lives.

==== Law ====
After the murder of Romina Ashrafi, the Vice Presidency for Women and Family Affairs of the Rouhani government proposed a plan to increase the punishment for fathers who kill their children, but it had no effect in the court that tried Romina's father. On this case, the lawyer told the newspaper Shargh about the importance of reviewing the law:

We have said again and again that our laws are not a deterrent against these crimes. Laws need to be updated and based on the prevailing customs of society, so that when bitter tragedies occur, it becomes possible, through the law and of course gradually over time, to confront them and reduce their numbers. The laws we have need to be adapted to current conditions and to this era. Only then can we use the law and its many dimensions in the fight against delinquency and crime in society.

— Ebrahim Nikdel-Ghadam, lawyer in the Romina Ashrafi case, Shargh newspaper

Most girls and women who fall victim to honor killings are those who stand up against the ruling patriarchal and domineering laws. Civil activists and human rights activists believe that the frequency of honor killings is due to the misogynistic laws of the Islamic Republic of Iran. A spokesperson for the Campaign to Stop Honor Killings said: "In the past 20 years, the number of honor killings in Iran has increased." In one study of the honor-killing cases of 1,220 women killed over the previous 20 years (up to 1398 / 2019–20), the research findings show that the number of killings over the last two decades has not only increased but has passed the crisis threshold. Of these killings, 286 were carried out with firearms, followed in frequency by killings with rope (hanging), knives, cleavers, acid attacks and fire.

==== Works ====
In cinema

Several films on this subject have been made in Iranian cinema, including the following:

- Orion – Ali Zamani
- Paternal House – Kianoush Ayari
- The Girl's House – Shahram Shah-Hosseini
- Sadeq the Kurd – Naser Taghvai
- Qeysar – Masoud Kimiai
- Lottery – Mohammad Hossein Mahdavian
- Butterfly Swim – Mohammad Kart

=== Human trafficking and forced prostitution ===
According to the annual report on human trafficking published by the United States Department of State in 2016, the number of Iranian women and girls taken to Dubai and to Iraqi Kurdistan for forced sexual services has increased. At the beginning of the section on Iran, the report states:

The Government of Iran does not fully meet the minimum standards for the elimination of trafficking and is not making significant efforts to do so.

According to the report, over the previous five years Iran has been a transit country, a country of origin and a destination for the sex trafficking of men, women and children, as well as for forced labor. Iranian girls aged 13 to 17 are targeted by human-trafficking gangs and taken abroad to be sold. From 2009 to 2015, the transfer of girls from inside Iran to one of the Persian Gulf countries for forced sexual services also increased. In the cities of Tehran, Tabriz and Astara, the number of teenage girls used to provide sexual services has increased.

A complete understanding of the market for illegal activities, including prostitution, is difficult and in some cases impossible. At the same time, without understanding the characteristics of the market for a phenomenon such as prostitution, intervention policies for preventing, controlling or reducing it cannot be designed. The age of entry into prostitution in Iran is between 16 and 22, which is higher than the global norm. An examination of some market factors, including the spatial and temporal distribution of activity, the number of clients, income and costs, and other matters, and a comparison of them with the findings of international studies, shows that geographically the prostitution market in Tehran is relatively concentrated in particular locations and along the city's main streets, and in this respect resembles global patterns.

The newspaper Jam-e Jam published a report titled "Hunting for Honor on Instagram" about traffickers who use social networks to smuggle Iranian girls to the countries of the Persian Gulf, writing:

None of its dialogues and scenes resembles documentaries or films. Here everything is real. The harsh, sharp slap of truth lands on your ear from the very start. Finding the dealers in this dirty trade in girls is not very hard at all. Their phone numbers are passed from hand to hand in cyberspace. These are people who talk shamelessly in "18+" terms.

In recent years there have been reports of the trafficking of Iranian girls to Pakistan and the countries of the Persian Gulf. The Mashriq newspaper, published in Balochistan, Pakistan, wrote that every month 45 underage Iranian girls are smuggled to Pakistan and used for immoral purposes. They are sold in Karachi. A large group is involved in trafficking these girls, deceiving Iranian girls and then selling them. In the countries of the Persian Gulf, when a family is looking for a maid, or a man wants a non-Arab woman for a temporary marriage (sigheh), they turn to people known for meeting such needs. These people first demand an advance payment and, a week later, deliver what was ordered.

Laws

Human rights organizations and institutions have reported that the Iranian government does not cooperate in international efforts to combat human trafficking and that Iran's domestic laws in this area are not consistent with international law. Some laws and religious traditions in Iran, such as sigheh (temporary marriage), leave the way open for abuse by human traffickers, and in a number of cases these networks sell Iranian women, under this same sigheh arrangement, to men in neighboring countries for forced prostitution. In addition, the performance of Iran's law-enforcement agencies in this area is unclear, and combating human trafficking and its consequences does not appear to be among the priorities of Iran's police.

=== Forced marriage ===
Forced marriage is a marriage that takes place without the genuine consent of one or both parties. Forced marriage violates the right to freely choose a spouse and is a form of domestic violence. Most victims of forced marriage are women, and the perpetrators are relatives of the victims. A study of the policies of various countries shows that different measures have been taken to combat it. In Iran, as in other countries, there are no accurate statistics on forced marriage. The reasons given for the under-reporting of forced marriage apply to Iran as well; it can even be said that the reluctance to report forced marriage in Iran is greater than in other systems. In the Iranian legal system, the lack of comprehensive and appropriate regulations has made combating forced marriage difficult. A look at the various laws shows that, alongside the international instruments that refer to the right to freedom of marriage and to which Iran has acceded, freedom of marriage has been addressed only in the discussion of the essential elements of the marriage contract and in some specific laws.

In Iran, many specialists in religious rulings, and according to most of the grand ayatollahs (marja's), forced marriage is forbidden. According to all the marja's, if a woman and a man, or one of them, is forced to marry and, after the marriage contract is read, they consent and say that they are satisfied with the contract, the contract is valid.

=== Child marriage ===
According to the definition of the World Health Organization, every human being under the age of 18 is considered a child. This definition is similar in the Convention on the Rights of the Child and for UNICEF. The World Health Organization defines child abuse as any harm to, or threat to, the physical and mental health or the well-being and welfare of a child by parents or persons responsible for the child.

In Iran, as in other developing societies, child marriage is common to a considerable extent in different parts of the country. According to official Iranian statistics, in 1393 (2014–15) some 187,000 marriages below the legal age were registered with the Civil Registration Organization. According to the deputy for prevention of social harms of the State Welfare Organization, in 1395 (2016–17) 17 percent of marriages of girls in Iran took place before the age of 18.

According to statistics from the first nine months of 1394 (2015–16) recorded by the Civil Registration Organization, more than five percent of the women who married in that period, that is 28,242 people, were under 15 years of age. More than 214,000 marriages of girls aged 15–19 were also registered in that period of the year. The border provinces of Razavi Khorasan, East Azerbaijan and Sistan and Baluchestan are the three provinces with the largest number of marriages at childhood ages. Among the common causes of child marriage in Iran are poverty, weak deterrent laws, cultural customs, religious beliefs, class disparities, education, patriarchy and men's "honor obsession" (namus-parasti).

One of the greatest contradictions between Iran's domestic laws and the Convention on the Rights of the Child appears in the age of marriage and the point at which children enter adulthood. According to Article 1041 of the Civil Code of Iran, the marriage contract of a girl before she reaches the age of 13 full lunar years is subject to the permission of her guardian, provided that her best interests are observed as determined by a competent court.

According to figures from the Statistical Centre of Iran, in the first quarter of 1399 (spring 2020), more than 7,000 marriages of girls aged 10 to 14 and one marriage of a girl under 10 were registered. Child marriage is most common among young girls. Amid legal support and the creation of facilities such as marriage loans of 70 million tomans to couples, the published figures and their comparison with the previous year show that child marriage rose by 10.5 percent.

==== Law ====
After the Qajar dynasty and the rise of the Pahlavi dynasty, the approach to marriage also changed. The first official, nationwide law dealing with the marriage of children and setting minimum age conditions for marriage dates to 1313 (1934). Article 1041 of the Civil Code declared in 1313 that in Iran, on the basis of the constitution and legal legitimacy, no marriage could take place between a girl under 15 and a boy under 18, unless special conditions were met in which the validity of the marriage was declared by a public prosecutor. This exception did not exist where the girl was under 13 and the boy under 15, meaning that they could not marry in any way.

In 1353 (1974) this law was changed to some extent, and under Article 23 of the Family Protection Law, the marriage of women before they had completed 18 years of age and of men before they had completed 20 years was prohibited. After the Iranian Revolution of 1979, the laws on marriage also changed. By order of Ruhollah Khomeini, the Family Protection Law was abolished and Article 1041 of the Civil Code of 1313 was provisionally reinstated as the basis. Some time later, a new law was enacted in 1361 (1982), under which the initial age of marriage, or age of puberty, was set at 9 for girls and 15 for boys, so that any attempt at marriage below these initial ages was illegal. The final change to the Civil Code was approved in 1381 (2002), under which the legitimacy of marriage between girls and boys below the defined age of puberty (13 and 15) was approved on the condition of the consent of a competent judge.

Despite the many reactions and objections from experts, the Islamic Consultative Assembly (Majlis) has still not taken a decision on child marriage and on setting a minimum age of marriage. Under Article 1041 of Iran's Civil Code, the marriage of children is possible with the permission of parents and the authorization of the court.

=== Child motherhood ===
The World Health Organization defines adolescent pregnancy as a pregnancy in which the mother is under 20 years of age at the end of the pregnancy. According to published statistics, each year about 16 million girls aged 15 to 19 and one million girls under 15 experience pregnancy and childbirth, most of which are reported in poor and low-income countries. According to studies, girls with the least education are five times more likely than girls with more education to be exposed to pregnancy and to experience motherhood at childhood ages.

Iran is one of the countries where, given that child marriage is legal, child motherhood has become a worrying issue. According to preliminary statistics on births in 1400 (2021–22), by age of mother at the time of birth, published by the Civil Registration Organization, in the first six months and 16 days of 1400, 791 children were born to mothers aged 10 to 14. Sistan and Baluchestan province, with 248 recorded births, has the highest number of births to child mothers in Iran.

=== Acid attacks ===
Acid attacks are one of the most severe types of violence and in some cases may even lead to the victim's death. An acid attack is an assault carried out not with the intent to kill but usually to take revenge and to destroy the victim's social life and future. Acid is a substance that has been known for centuries, but the phenomenon of acid attacks does not appear to be more than 150 years old.

In 1393 (2014), according to officials of Isfahan province and the medical staff of Feiz Hospital, there were four acid attacks within a short period. Officials declared the motive for these attacks to be personal enmity, whereas the victims deny the existence of any personal enmity; the common feature of most of the victims was that they did not wear the chador, drove a car, and were in the area of Mehrdad Street and Shiraz Gate.

=== Kidnapping ===
One very common way of trafficking women in Iran is the abduction of young girls. According to the deputy for combating criminal offenses of the Tehran Criminal Investigation Police, perhaps 400 cases of the kidnapping of girls are opened every month at Precinct 11 of the Criminal Investigation Office.

=== Sexual harassment and violence ===
Sexual violence against political prisoners is common in Iran. It is said to be ignored, or even facilitated, by the authorities. Reports submitted to the United Nations indicate that rape by interrogators has been used in Iran for decades. In the 1980s, after the Islamic Revolution of Iran, the rape of female political prisoners reached such a scale that Hussein-Ali Montazeri, then deputy to Ayatollah Khomeini, was moved to write to Khomeini, in a letter dated 7 Mehr 1365 (29 September 1986): "Did you know that in some prisons of the Islamic Republic young women are being raped?" Two members of Iran's human rights community, the feminist lawyer and journalist Shadi Sadr and the blogger and activist Mojtaba Samienejad, published articles from inside Iran online asserting that prison rape has a long history in the Islamic Republic. On 9 Mordad 1388 (31 July 2009), Mehdi Karroubi wrote a letter to the head of the Expediency Discernment Council calling for an investigation into Iran's prisons because of the possibility of torture and, in particular, the sexual abuse of men and women. On 19 Mordad (10 August), he wrote to Ali Larijani, the speaker of parliament, asking to meet with President Mahmoud Ahmadinejad, the head of the judiciary Sadeq Larijani and Akbar Hashemi Rafsanjani in order to present his documents and evidence on the sexual cases in person.

=== Compulsory hijab ===
Compulsory hijab is one of the most violent laws that women in Iran face. Compulsory hijab in Iran meets with everyday resistance. In addition to open protests against it, statistics also indicate that women resist by not observing hijab. A former managing director of the newspaper Kayhan, during a televised debate held in 1399 (2020–21), said that 70 percent of people in Iran oppose compulsory hijab and that each year the number of those who adhere to hijab falls by about five percent.

Since the beginning of the Islamic Republic, women's hijab has been regarded by the rulers as one of the most prominent signs of displaying an "Islamic country". Over the past four decades the government has sought to achieve its goal through coercive policies. Since the formation of the Islamic Republic, various forms of oppression and widespread violence against women have been advanced through all kinds of government programs. In prison, this takes the form of humiliation and torture; on the street, the presence of the Guidance Patrols; in schools and the education system, anti-woman content and the instilling of superior and inferior roles for men and women; in the courts, all kinds of sexist and demeaning insults and discriminatory laws on divorce and custody; and in the family and clan, life under the shadow of a man. Different forms of repression and control operate both directly and indirectly.

==== Law ====
Under Article 638 of the Islamic Penal Code, "whoever openly commits a haram act in public view, in public places or on thoroughfares shall, in addition to the punishment for the act, be sentenced to imprisonment from 10 days to two months or 74 lashes; and if he commits an act that is not in itself punishable but that offends public decency, he shall be sentenced only to imprisonment from 10 days to two months or 74 lashes." The accompanying note states: "Women who appear on thoroughfares and in public view without the Islamic hijab shall be sentenced to imprisonment from 10 days to two months or a fine of 50,000 to 500,000 rials."

=== Domestic violence ===
In Iran, family relations between husband and wife are regulated by the Civil Code, which regards marriage as a hierarchical institution in which the husband has authority over his wife. Article 1105 states: "In relations between husband and wife, the position of head of the family is exclusively the husband's." The husband is obliged to provide maintenance (nafaqa) for his wife, but this obligation lapses if the wife fails to fulfil her duties. Article 1108 states: "If the wife refuses, without a legitimate excuse, to perform the duties of a wife, she shall not be entitled to maintenance."

The nature of domestic violence is complicated by laws that support control, cruelty and violence against women. The state does this by promoting fundamentalist beliefs that regard women as men's property. It does this by creating an unequal legal system and by not punishing assault even when it results in serious injury or, at times, death. As a result, domestic violence cannot be merely a family matter but begins to form a systematic violence that is fueled by tradition, fueled by religion, encouraged by the dominant authoritarian state, and empowered by poverty and illiteracy. At the center of this issue is the belief, rooted in common law, that men are responsible for the affairs of their households, especially the treatment of family members, and should not be subject to state interference.

Iranian feminists believe that women's issues need to be examined more closely, because many women in Iran face domestic violence. Religious intellectuals have responded to the "woman question" in the Iranian context with a reluctant analysis of how it has been posed. So far, their analyses have not considered the gender implications of the struggle against absolutism and traditional authority. However, the dynamic interaction of the reform project with the demands of various sectors of Iranian public life will not allow the matter to rest there. In seeking to recreate fundamental religious truth in new concepts and intellectual systems, religious intellectuals will increasingly have to confront systemic gender inequalities in a more systematic way. Some conservative elements of Iranian society have reacted against feminist efforts to reduce domestic violence in Iran. For example, Minoo Aslani, a leader of the women's Basij, opposed efforts to combat domestic abuse in Iran because she felt they threatened Iran's traditional values. Many people in positions of power hold similar views and regard feminist efforts to achieve gender equality as a threat to Islamic principles.

The prevalence of domestic violence has been cited as a factor in the high rate of suicide, mainly by self-immolation, among Kurdish women in Iran. A study by the World Health Organization in Babol found that in the past year 15.0 percent of wives had been physically abused, 42.4 percent sexually abused and 81.5 percent psychologically abused (to varying degrees) by their husbands, with low income, young age, unemployment and low education given as the reasons.

In 2004, Ghazi Tabatabai, an Iranian sociologist, led a study of domestic violence for a joint project carried out by the Presidential Women's Advisory Center, the Ministry of Higher Education and the Ministry of Interior. Other prominent researchers, specialists, psychologists and sociologists also took part in the study, which covered centers in 28 provinces of Iran and, after several years, ran to 32 volumes. The findings of the questionnaire focused on the following areas:

- violence against women and children
- marriage and remarriage
- divorce
- the effect of education and work on violence and family issues.

The findings of the 32 volumes were made available only to researchers and scholars at the Tehran research center and were shared with legislators and government organizations. Iran is a diverse country with many ethnic and cultural communities, and the study produced different results by province. This can be attributed to the lack of higher education, the economy, and the dominance of religion.

- 53 percent of married women in Iran are subjected to domestic violence in the first year of marriage, whether by their husbands or by both spouses.
- Overall, the married women participating in the study in Iran experienced 7.4 percent of the nine categories of abuse.
- The greater the number of children in a family, the greater the likelihood of domestic violence against women.
- 9.63 percent of the women in the study said that they wished their husbands would die as a result of the abuse they had experienced.

| Main category of abuse | Statistics | Comments |
|---|---|---|
| Verbal abuse | Not provided in the abstract of the paper. | |
| Physical abuse | 8.37 percent of the married women in this study reported experiencing severe physical abuse. | |
| Emotional abuse | 52 percent of the married women in this study reported experiencing emotional abuse. | |
| Economic abuse, such as: refusing to let her have a job, limiting her opportunities, taking her income, limiting her allowance | Not provided in the abstract of the paper. | |
| Legal abuse, for example: a husband in Iran has the right to deprive his wife of her full rights by restricting her from traveling and from leaving the house. | Not provided in the abstract of the paper. | |
| Educational abuse: restricting the right to attend school | 7.27 percent of the married women in this study reported experiencing educational and occupational restrictions. | Women who have higher education and women who work experience lower levels of domestic violence. |
| Neglect by restricting food or by not adequately feeding or providing for the family | Not provided in the abstract of the paper. | |
| Sexual abuse, including marital rape, forced pregnancy, forced abortion, and restricting a spouse's access to health care and birth control. | 2.10 percent of the married women in this study reported experiencing sexual abuse. However, this figure may be severely under-reported because of the taboo surrounding the subject. Of the women who reported sexual abuse, 5.2 percent reported having had a miscarriage because of severe beating by their husbands. | |
| Honor killings and murder | 5.23 percent of the married women in this study reported experiencing near-fatal violence or fearing for their lives because of domestic violence. | Iran's police chief reported that 40 percent of murders in Iran occur because of domestic violence, and that 50 percent of all women who are murdered are killed by a member of the family, mostly in the woman's home. |

Since about 1994 there have been a significant number of theses written on women's issues at the higher levels of study, including master's and PhD levels, at Iranian universities. Because the papers have not led to change or progress, many universities now discourage the writing of theses on Iranian women's issues.

According to a study published in Iran, during the outbreak of COVID-19 and the lockdown more than 77 percent of Iranian women had experienced at least one type of violence. Among these 77.2 percent of women who were victims of violence, 91.2 percent had experienced psychological violence, 65.8 percent physical violence, 42.6 percent sexual violence and 38.2 percent violence resulting in injury. During the pandemic, calls to the social emergency service about domestic violence did not increase significantly, but when a text message about the 123 hotline was sent to families, calls rose seven- to eightfold.

According to a report published by the Statistical Centre of Iran in 1400 (2021–22) on "physical spousal abuse", over the previous four years 94 percent of forensic medicine examinations in this regard have consistently been of women. Over the same four-year period, between 55 and 90 percent of forensic medicine examinations concerning "claimants of psychological spousal abuse" were of women, and in 1399 (2020–21) this figure reached 94 percent. The statistics published by the Statistical Centre of Iran show that about 96 percent of the 80,187 forensic medicine examinations of claimants of physical spousal abuse in the past year (1399) concerned women. Of the 182 forensic examinations relating to "psychological spousal abuse", only 10 concerned men and the rest concerned women.

According to research in Iran whose results were published in the book Battered Women by Shahla Ezazi, 83 percent of the battered women in the study were housewives and 92 percent of them were subjected to violence in their own homes. The high rate of domestic violence, which most often takes place in front of children, can leave irreparable effects on the next generation.

==== Laws ====
Existing laws (Articles 42, 43 and 66 of Iran's Code of Criminal Procedure) are intended to prohibit violence in the form of kidnapping, sexual harassment, abuse of pregnant women and "crimes against rights and responsibilities within the family", but for cultural and political reasons they do not protect women, do not prosecute their attackers and do not provide services to victims.

In the week ending 16 September 2011, legislation to better enforce existing laws and to protect women against violence was placed on the agenda of the Iranian parliament, focusing on the protection of women and the prevention of violence against them, including a focus on human trafficking, better protection and services for victims, rehabilitation (particularly in cases of domestic abuse), and better procedures for handling the interrogation of female offenders. One of the keys to ultimate success was said to be changing society's cultural outlook on the use of violence against women.

=== Gender-based violence ===
While governments codify and organize patriarchal violence against women, society, made up of the family, the media, institutions and social networks, which embody social, class and gender relations and are influenced by the state and the market, plays a role in producing and reproducing violence. The woman's body is treated as a sexual commodity, and her virginity and the control of it is a necessity that figures in various ways in men's evaluations of women. These are patriarchal notions that have been transmitted from generation to generation and have kept the balance of power fixed in men's favor.

== Policies ==
Laws in Iran not only fail to protect women against the gender-based violence they face at home, in the workplace or in other public places, but in many cases themselves promote violence against women. Women in Iran face structural and systemic violence from childhood, violence that deprives them from an early age of access to their most basic human needs. Under the Islamic Republic, Iran is among the fifty countries that have no specific laws to combat violence, particularly domestic violence.

=== Bill to prevent violence against women ===
The bill "Prevention of Violence against Women" has an uncertain fate after many ups and downs over the past six years, including a change of name from "Prevention of Violence against Women" to "Securing Women's Safety" and then "Protection and Dignity of Women", with provisions removed and its scope narrowed at each renaming.

The bill on violence against women has been under review and revision since 1392 (2013) and was approved by the Iranian government in Shahrivar 1398 (August–September 2019). The aim of the bill is to address domestic violence against women in Iran. The bill intends to tackle violence through education. In practice, it introduces training courses for teachers, parents and students to help others recognize when a woman is being subjected to violence, and to help raise awareness of the issue of abuse against women. The bill also provides legal protection for women in abusive situations, including safe houses and medical and psychological assistance for women. It also introduces training for medical staff to equip them to help women who seek help in violent situations.

Another fundamental reform in the bill requires law enforcement to redesign how it deals with violence against women. Before the bill, many lawyers and law-enforcement officers were cautious about handling domestic violence cases, often regarding violence against women as a family matter rather than a matter for the state. The bill now requires the judiciary and law enforcement to address the issue seriously and to treat it as a matter of public security.

=== Measures ===
The 123 hotline is reserved for social emergency calls, through which people at risk and those who have suffered social harm can seek help.

== Restrictions ==
Gender stereotypes about sport in Iran, where women face structural restrictions, are especially evident. Girls who, from the moment they start school, because of compulsory hijab, the wearing of headscarves and loose, long manteaus, and confinement to enclosed spaces, have in practice no opportunity for movement and physical activity.

In Iran many sports, such as cycling, that require presence in the public sphere have been declared forbidden for women. The ban on women's cycling in Iran is so strict that even young girls cannot ride a bicycle to school. Mohammad-Taqi Naghdali, the representative of Khomeini Shahr in the Islamic Consultative Assembly, an opponent of women's cycling who has called it illegal and haram in public spaces, called for women's cycling to be moved to enclosed places such as women-only parks so that the activity would become reasonable.

These bans and restrictions on sports environments for women and girls have brought many physical and psychological harms. According to the deputy for social affairs of Iran's Welfare Organization, over the past 15 years, because of the lack of space and movement, the vital capacity and health of girls has fallen by 11 percent.

According to figures announced by Afshin Molaei, head of the Sport for All Federation, the rate of physical inactivity and non-exercise among women in Iran has reached an alarming 64 percent. Calling the figure worrying, Molaei says: "If within a four-year period we cannot put public sport among the women and girls of the country into practice, in the next decade we will face nothing but a population of sick women."

Research shows that helping girls to lead active lives in adolescence greatly helps them to continue this pattern in adulthood. Inactive girls will become inactive women who suffer from serious diseases. Physical inactivity in girls causes hormonal disorders and leads to osteoporosis and reduced muscle strength. Menstrual disorders are also reported as another complication of inactivity in girls. High blood pressure, type 2 diabetes, breast cancer, and ovarian and cervical cancer are other diseases that people who were inactive in childhood will face in adulthood.

Farzaneh Torkan, a physical medicine specialist and founder of the first sports medicine body, the Tehran Sports Medicine Board, referring to research on girls' sport, says: "In the case of Iranian women, we face the problem that 60 percent of our women suffer from movement poverty from pre-adolescent ages; that is, movement poverty in our women begins at primary-school age. This situation continues and persists into youth and middle age and leads to diseases that must be treated and paid for." According to this physician, and based on the research conducted, the age of puberty among girls in Iran has fallen very low and has reached primary-school age, that is 9 and 10 years. According to the same research, the age of puberty among girls who exercised was higher than among girls who did not.

In line with the government's outlook, most sports clubs in Iran have allocated their morning and noon sessions to women, while the afternoon and evening hours, when working women and adolescent schoolgirls can attend, are in practice allocated to men. These policies teach girls from early childhood that sport in Iran is a male domain, of which only a small share, and only in some large cities and for a particular class, is allotted to them.

== Activism and protest ==
Compulsory hijab

Girls of Enghelab Street was the name of a campaign in which girls and women, in protest against compulsory hijab in Iran, took off their headscarves in the street in a symbolic act. In some places in the city, some girls climbed onto platforms and put their headscarves on sticks as a sign of protest. Men have also at times supported the action by waving headscarves or carrying placards. The movement was founded and started by Vida Movahed.

Protest against sexual violence in cinema

In Farvardin 1401 (March–April 2022), a statement was published by a significant group (300) of prominent women filmmakers protesting violence against women in cinema. Parts of the statement read: "In recent months, women, on the ground they themselves created through a movement against sexual violence, have published accounts of abuse and the exercise of power over women in the cinema environment. Reports show that every person with power and fame in the machinery of Iranian cinema exploits his position to bully, threaten, insult, humiliate and assault women, without legal bodies, the House of Cinema, filmmakers and critics obliging them to be held accountable and to accept responsibility for their actions."

Campaign to Stop Honor Killings

After the murder of Romina Ashrafi, a group of women decided to form a circle of women's rights activists inside and outside Iran to work for changing laws in women's favor and for public education and culture-building in this area. Many women are now members of the campaign, from university professors in European countries to housewives and rural women who work to prevent honor killings.

Sexual harassment

Beginning in the summer of 1399 (2020), the MeToo movement in Iran started on social networks, particularly Twitter; this movement consists of Iranian victims' accounts of sexual harassment. The event was similar to the Me Too movement that created great controversy in 2017.

== Observances ==
4 Azar is the day known in the international calendar as the Day for Combating Violence against Women. Since 1981, 25 November each year (equivalent to 4 Azar) has been designated as the International Day for the Elimination of Violence against Women. This day was chosen to recall the collective resolve to combat violence against women. The United Nations General Assembly approved the designation of this day as an international day on 17 December 1999.

== See also ==
- Women in Iran
