= Bala Mahalleh-ye Chubar =

Village in Gilan province, Iran

Bala Mahalleh-ye Chubar Persian: بالامحله چوبر
- Village
- Location within Iran
- Coordinates: 38°10′17″N 48°51′52″E
- Country: Iran
- Province: Gilan
- County: Talesh
- District: Haviq
- Rural District: Chubar

Population (2016)
  - Total: 644
- Time zone: UTC+3:30 (IRST)

Bala Mahalleh-ye Chubar (Persian: بالامحله چوبر) (Note: Also romanized as Bālā Maḩalleh-ye Chūbar) is a village in Chubar Rural District of Haviq District in Talesh County, Gilan province, Iran.

== Demographics ==
=== Language ===
Linguistic composition of the village.

Bala Mahalleh-ye Chubar linguistic composition
| language | percent |
| Azerbaijani | 100% |

=== Population ===
At the time of the 2006 National Census, the village's population was 500 in 117 households. The following census in 2011 counted 307 people in 77 households. The 2016 census measured the population of the village as 644 people in 197 households.
