= Henzeni =

Village in Gilan province, Iran

Henzeni Persian: هنزني
- Village
- Location within Iran
- Coordinates: 38°06′58″N 48°52′49″E
- Country: Iran
- Province: Gilan
- County: Talesh
- District: Haviq
- Rural District: Haviq

Population (2016)
  - Total: 733
- Time zone: UTC+3:30 (IRST)

Henzeni (Persian: هنزني) (Note: Also romanized as Henzenī; also known as Henzenī-ye Pā’īn) is a village in Haviq Rural District (Note: Formerly Kargan Rud Rural District) of Haviq District in Talesh County, Gilan province, Iran.

== Demographics ==
=== Population ===
At the time of the 2006 National Census, the village's population was 806 in 191 households. The following census in 2011 counted 639 people in 178 households. The 2016 census measured the population of the village as 733 people in 233 households.
