= Bala Mahalleh =

Bala Mahalleh (Persian: بالا محله) may refer to:

- Bala Mahalleh-ye Barka Deh, a village in Rasht County, Gilan province, Iran
- Bala Mahalleh-ye Chubar, a village in Talesh County, Gilan province, Iran
- Bala Mahalleh-ye Gafsheh, a village in Rasht County, Gilan province, Iran
- Bala Mahalleh-ye Gildeh, a village in Astaneh-ye Ashrafiyeh County, Gilan province, Iran
- Bala Mahalleh-ye Golrudbar, a village in Lahijan County, Gilan province, Iran
- Bala Mahalleh-ye Narakeh, a village in Amlash County, Gilan province, Iran
- Bala Mahalleh-ye Naser Kiadeh, a village in Lahijan County, Gilan province, Iran
- Bala Mahalleh-ye Pashaki, a village in Lahijan County, Gilan province, Iran
- Bala Mahalleh-ye Qasemabad, a village in Rudsar County, Gilan province, Iran
- Bala Mahalleh-ye Siah Belash, a village in Rezvanshahr County, Gilan province, Iran
