= Seydgah =

Seydgah (Persian: صيدگاه) may refer to:

- Seydgah-e Haviq
- Seydgah-e Khotbeh Sara
