= Kuhestan-e Haviq =

Kuhestan-e Haviq كوهستان حويق
- Village
- Location within Iran
- Coordinates: 38°08′00″N 48°50′00″E
- Country: Iran
- Province: Gilan
- County: Talesh
- Bakhsh: Haviq
- Rural District: Haviq

Population (2016)
  - Total: 208
- Time zone: UTC+3:30 (IRST)

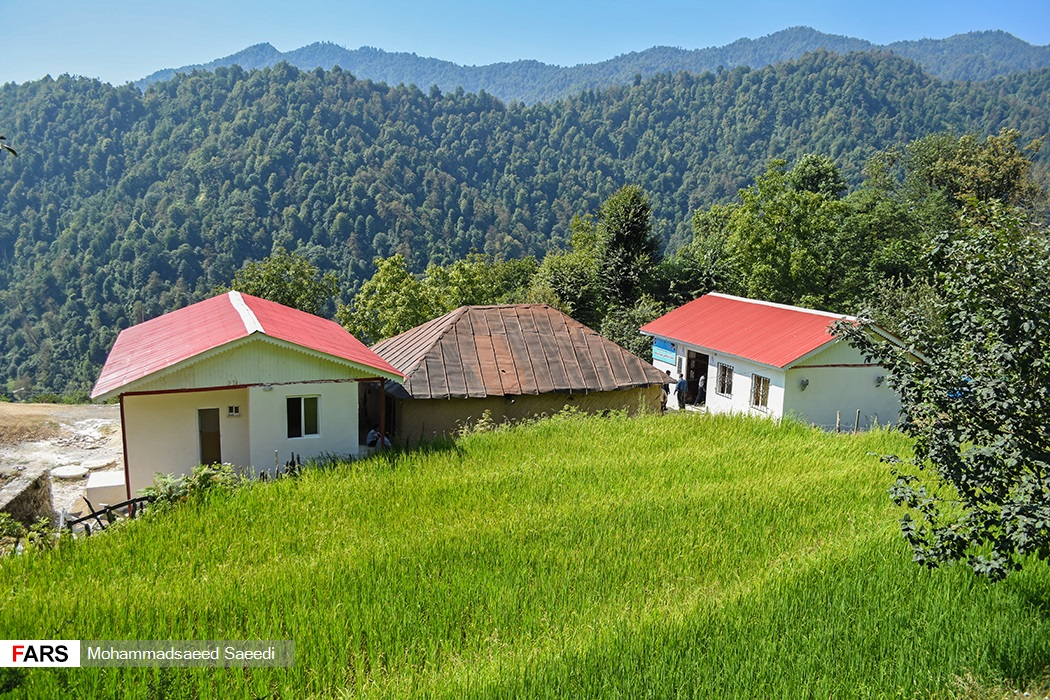

Kuhestan-e Haviq (Persian: كوهستان حويق) is a mountainous village in Haviq Rural District, Haviq District, Talesh County, Gilan Province, Iran. As of the 2016 census, its population was 208, living in 56 households. Down from 275 people in 2006. All residents of the village speak Azerbaijani natively.
