= Owtar, Iran =

Owtar or Autar (Persian: اوتار) may refer to:

- Owtar, Haviq
- Owtar, Kargan Rud
