= Seyyed Mahalleh-ye Shirabad =

Seyyed Mahalleh-ye Shirabad سيدمحله شيراباد
- Village
- Location within Iran
- Coordinates: 38°04′58″N 48°52′48″E
- Country: Iran
- Province: Gilan
- County: Talesh
- Bakhsh: Haviq
- Rural District: Haviq

Population (2016)
  - Total: 477
- Time zone: UTC+3:30 (IRST)

Seyyed Mahalleh-ye Shirabad (Persian: سيدمحله شيراباد, also Romanized as Seyyed Maḩalleh-ye Shīrābād; also known as Khvājeh Karī, Seyyed Lar Maḩalleh, and Seyyed Maḩalleh) is a village in Haviq Rural District, Haviq District, Talesh County, Gilan Province, Iran.

At the time of the 2006 National Census, the village's population was 534 in 137 households. The following census in 2011 counted 493 people in 135 households. The 2016 census measured the population of the village as 477 people in 174 households.
