= Ayarna =

Ayarna is a Ghanaian surname. Notable people with the surname include:

- Imoru Ayarna (c. 1917–2015), Ghanaian businessman and politician
- Reuben Ayarna (born 1985), Ghanaian football midfielder

== See also ==
- Ayarneh
