= Kuhestan, Haviq =

Kuhestan كوهستان
- Village
- Location within Iran
- Coordinates: 38°07′17″N 48°47′57″E
- Country: Iran
- Province: Gilan
- County: Talesh
- Bakhsh: Haviq
- Rural District: Haviq

Population (2016)
  - Total: 213
- Time zone: UTC+3:30 (IRST)

Kuhestan (Persian: كوهستان, also Romanized as Kūhestān; also known as Kūhestān-e Bālā-ye Ḩavīq) is a village in Haviq Rural District, Haviq District, Talesh County, Gilan Province, Iran.

At the time of the 2006 National Census, the village's population was 181 in 38 households. The following census in 2011 counted 269 people in 52 households. The 2016 census measured the population of the village as 213 people in 57 households.

== Language ==
Linguistic composition of the village.

Kuhestan, Haviq linguistic composition
language	percent
Azerbaijani	100%
