= Murder of Mona Heydari =

2022 murder in Ahvaz, Iran

- Date: 5 February 2022
- Location: Ahvaz, Iran
- Type: Honour killing
- Target: Mona Heydari
- Perpetrator: Sajjad Heydari
- Participants: 2

Ghazal "Mona" Heydari (24 December 2004 – 5 February 2022) was an Iranian Arab teenage girl who was beheaded in Ahvaz, Iran in an "honour killing" by her husband. Mona and her husband were first cousins. Pictures and videos of her husband, Sajjad Heydari, smiling while carrying her head, caused widespread outrage in Iran. In the aftermath of the beheading, her husband and her brother-in-law were arrested by Iranian police.

== Background ==
Mona Heydari was married to Sajjad Heydari, at the age of 12. She fled to Turkey to escape her husband's domestic abuse against her. She was brought back to Iran by her close relatives.

She had a child, aged 3. She gave birth to her child when she was 14.

== Incident ==
She was beheaded by her husband and her brother-in-law in a house. Her body was dumped.

== Aftermath ==
Human Rights Watch condemned the murder, calling for reforming a draft law that would criminalize violence against women.

Human rights activists in Iran made a petition on Daadkhast, an Iranian-based petition website, to stop killings in Iran. The petition gathered over 1,500 signatures.

== Perpetrator ==
The Iranian government shut down Rokna News Agency, an Iranian news website, for displaying an image of Sajjad Heydari holding a knife in one hand, and Mona's head in another. The reason for shutting down Rokna was given as "publishing images and issues that violate public decency".

On 18 January 2023, Sajjad Heydari was sentenced to more than 8 years in prison for the decapitation of his wife, and the public display of her head. The charges include murder and assault, as told by judiciary spokesman Massoud Setayeshi to reporters.

== See also ==
- Killing of Tiba al-Ali
- Murder of Romina Ashrafi
- List of honor killings in Iran
