= Kuhestan, Kargan Rud =

Kuhestan كوهستان
- Village
- Location within Iran
- Coordinates: 38°00′30″N 48°48′06″E
- Country: Iran
- Province: Gilan
- County: Talesh
- Bakhsh: Kargan Rud
- Rural District: Khotbeh Sara

Population (2006)
  - Total: 251
- Time zone: UTC+3:30 (IRST)
  - Summer (DST): UTC+4:30 (IRDT)

Kuhestan (Persian: كوهستان, also Romanized as Kūhestān) is a village in Khotbeh Sara Rural District, Kargan Rud District, Talesh County, Gilan Province, Iran. At the 2006 census, its population was 251, in 66 families.
