= Murder of Romina Ashrafi =

2020 murder in Iran

- Romina Ashrafi
- Location: 38°13′54″N 48°51′55″E; Sefid Sangan, Talesh, Gilan province Iran
- Date: May 21, 2020; 6 years ago
- Attack type: Murder by strangulation and decapitation
- Weapon: Sickle
- Deaths: 1
- Charges: Murder

On May 12, 2020, Reza Ashrafi, the father of 14-year old Iranian girl Romina Ashrafi killed her as she slept in the family home in Sefid Sangan, Talesh, Gilan province.

The day prior, police had forcibly returned Romina Ashrafi to her family's home after she eloped with 28-year-old Bahamn Khavari.

News of the murder caught national and international attention. Reza Ashrafi was jailed for nine years.

== Background ==
Romina Ashrafi (Persian: رومینا اشرفی; born 2006) was a 14-year-old Iranian girl from Sefid Sangan, Talesh, who eloped with 28-year-old Bahamn Khavari in May 2020. The couple eloped to Khavari's sister's house in Shalgun village.

Romina's family opposed the relationship between her and Khavari due to differing religions between Khavari and Romina's family, and her young age.

In May 2020, using his telephone, Reza Ashrafi pretended to support their marriage and tricked the couple into arranging a wedding ceremony. Reza Ashrafi arrived at the ceremony with police who arrested the couple, before returning Romina to her father. Romina reportedly expressed to police that she feared for her life, prior to being returned, against her will.

== Death ==
On May 21, within 24 hours of being returned, Reza Ashrafi killed Romina by decapitation using a sickle while she slept in her bedroom. He had earlier attempted to kill her by strangulation. Later in court, Reza Ashrafi stated that he had killed her to clear his honour.

Reza Ashrafi sought legal advice from a relative who was a law student, prior to the murder. He received advice that honour killings were permissible under the Islamic Penal Code.

== Aftermath ==
Romina's funeral was held on June 5, 2020, at her grandfather's house in Sefidsangan village.

=== Judicial reaction ===
Reza Ashrafi was arrested the day after the killing and later charged with murder. Police described his motives as "honour".

In September, after a trial at The Criminal Court of Gilan Province, Reza Ashrafi was sentenced to nine years in jail and ordered to pay financial compensation to Rana Dashti, Romina's mother. Romina's mother stated that she would appeal the court's judgement, seeking a harsher penalty.

Bahamn Khavari was cleared of abduction charges, on the basis of Romina consenting. In response to the indecency charges, Bahamn Khavari was sentenced to 24 months in jail, 99 lashes and two years in exile. Reza Ashrafi is held in Lakan prison in Rasht.

=== Commentary ===
News of the murder provoked widespread public concern on social media the #RominaAshrafi hashtag was used over 50,000 times on Twitter commonly accompanied with condemnation for the murder. Khavari was also criticised online for the age difference between him and Romina. Khavari told BBC Persian that "love does not know age." Khavari also stated that he had been in love with Romina for five years prior. The legal minimum age to marry in Iran is 13 years for women.

The official in charge of social welfare in the Gilan province call the killing "an example of a clear violation of children's rights".

The news made the front page of several Iranian newspapers. Ebtekar newspaper used the headline "Insecure paternal home" and stated that existing legislation provided insufficient protection for women and children. Iranian president Hassan Rouhani called for the criminalisation of honour killings within days of Romina's death. Iran's vice president of family affairs, Masoumeh Ebtekar spoke of her aspirations for a parliamentary bill that would introduce harsher punishments.

Mahmoud Abbasi, Iran's deputy Ministry of Justice, attributed the murder to the "cultural poverty of the parents" and their lack of education.

== See also ==
- List of honor killings in Iran
- Marriageable age
- Killing of Tiba al-Ali
- Murder of Mona Heydari
