= List of honor killings in Iran =

The following is a list of notable honor killings in Iran:

Date	Victim	Ref.
May 2020	Romina Ashrafi	
May 2021	Ali Fazeli Monfared	
May 2021	Babak Khorramdin	
February 2022	Mona Heydari	
August 2024	Mobina Zeynivand	
January 2025	Kani Abdollahi	
January 2025	Atefeh Zaghibi	
April 16, 2025	Fatemeh Soltani	
