= Haviq Rural District =

Rural district in Gilan province, Iran

Haviq Rural District Persian: دهستان حویق
- Rural District
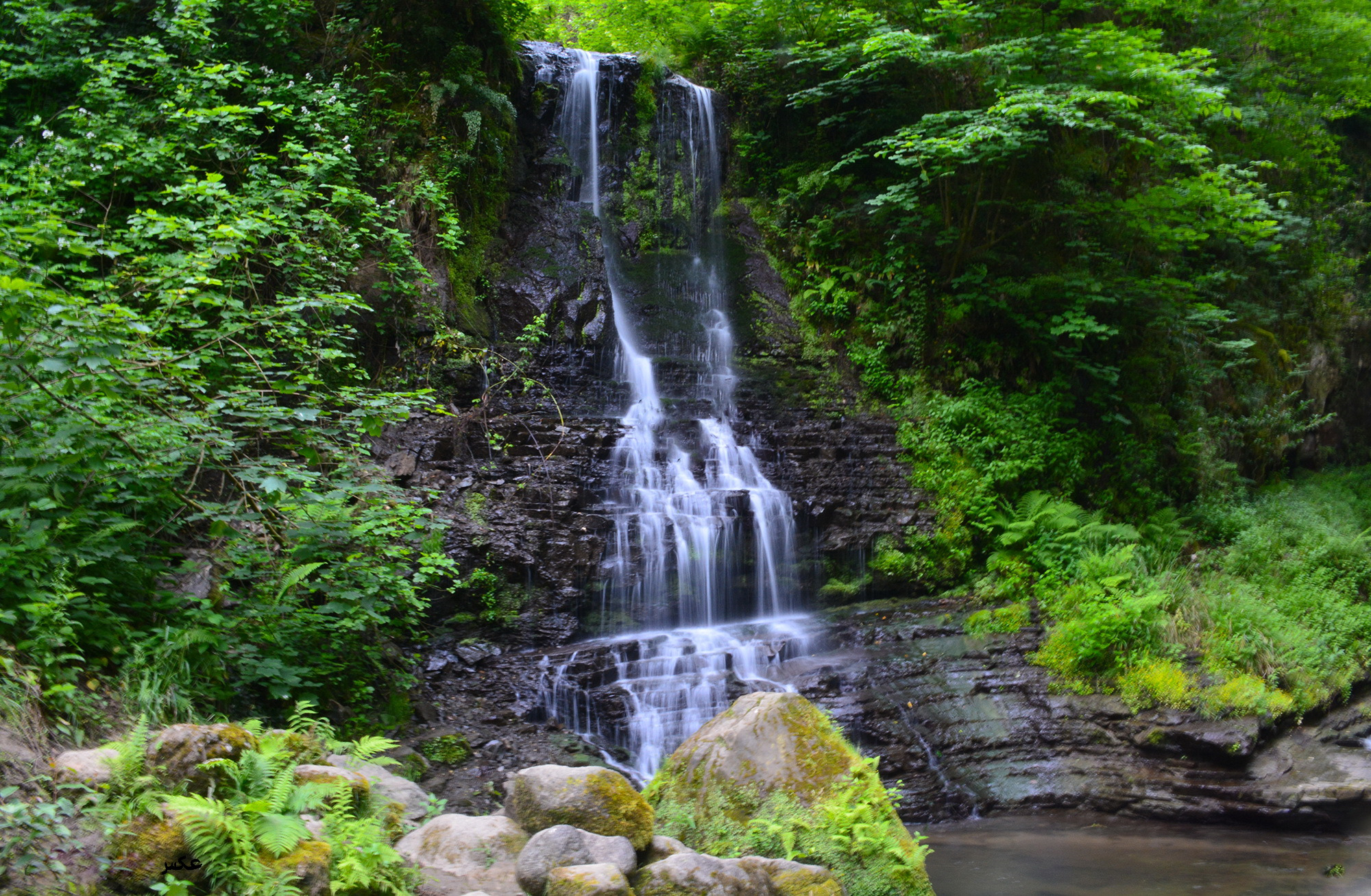
- Zomorrod (Emerald) twin waterfalls in highlands of Haviq

- Location within Iran
- Coordinates: 38°08′N 48°47′E
- Country: Iran
- Province: Gilan
- County: Talesh
- District: Haviq
- Established: 1987
- Capital: Haviq

Population (2016)
  - Total: 9,826
- Time zone: UTC+3:30 (IRST)

Haviq Rural District (Persian: دهستان حویق), (Note: Formerly Kargan Rud Rural District (دهستان کرگان‌رود)) is in Haviq District of Talesh County, Gilan province, Iran. It is administered from the city of Haviq.

== Demographics ==
=== Population ===
At the time of the 2006 National Census, the rural district's population was 11,201 in 2,550 households. There were 9,247 inhabitants in 2,487 households at the census of 2011. The 2016 census measured the population of the rural district as 9,826 in 2,934 households. The most populous of its 36 villages was Herandan, with 2,971 people.

=== Other villages in the rural district ===
- Aghasi
- Atranmar
- Babalu Mahalleh
- Bagheshlu Mahalleh
- Barzbar
- Bazargah
- Beliti
- Bijar Bin
- Dash Dibi
- Hashtaruchuni
- Helis
- Henzeni
- Henzeni-ye Bala
- Hulizhi
- Khalileh Sara
- Kuhestan
- Kuhestan-e Haviq
- Lenza
- Loukeh
- Mazhdeh Ali
- Mohammadali Yurdi
- Nav
- Owtar Mahalleh-ye Shirabad
- Owtar
- Randeh Sar
- Rik-e Haviq
- Satoum
- Seyyed Mahalleh-ye Shirabad
- Shirabad Mahalleh
- Shirabad
- Sutapara
- Tuel
- Vashreh
- Zarhuni
- Zomori
