= Kuhestan Rural District =

Kuhestan Rural District (Persian: دهستان كوهستان) may refer to:

- Kuhestan Rural District (Ajab Shir County)
- Kuhestan Rural District (Fars Province)
- Kuhestan Rural District (Isfahan Province)
- Kuhestan Rural District (Kerman Province)
- Kuhestan Rural District (Behshahr County), in Mazandaran Province
- Kuhestan Rural District (Chalus County), in Mazandaran Province
