= Babak Khorramdin (director) =

Iranian director (1974–2021)

Babak Khoramdin
- Born: 23 September 1974; Tehran, Iran
- Died: 15 May 2021 (aged 46); Tehran, Iran
- Occupation: Director
- Parents: Akbar Khorramdin (father); Iran Mousavi Sani (mother)

Babak Khorramdin (Persian: بابک خرمدین; 23 September 1974 – 15 May 2021) was an Iranian director and writer.

== Works ==
Khorramdin's works include the short films Boor Bijadeh Rang (2007), Tuesday: Mom (2009), the semi-feature film Aperture (2010), the feature film An Elegy for Yashar, made in London in 2013, and three short fiction films called Cut (2004).

== Awards ==
Khorramdin received the award for best short fiction film for Boor Bijadeh Rang at the Asa International Film Festival (Humanitarian Films) in 2009, and his works were nominated in various categories for multiple awards ceremonies, earning him the Diploma of Honor for Best Director for Boor Bijadeh Rang at the 5th Parvin Etesami International Film Festival in 2009; the best director, the best screenplay and the best voice editing for Boor Bijadeh Rang at the 6th Nahal Student Film Festival (University of Arts) in 2009, and a nomination for the best filming and editing.

== Murder ==
Khorramdin was murdered by his parents Akbar and Iran in Ekbatan, Tehran, in May 2021. On 16 May, after parts of his mutilated body were found by a municipal worker in Ekbatan, Khorramdin's parents were arrested by the police and subsequently confessed to killing their son. The parents were unrepentant, accusing their son of being corrupt for not having married.

On 17 May, Khorramdin's father confessed that he and his wife had drugged and anesthetized their child and tied his legs with a linen bandage, put a plastic bandage around his neck, and stabbed him several times afterwards. After mutilating their son's body in their bathroom, his remains were put in three handbags and dumped in the garbage bins in phase 3 of Ekbatan, Ariashahr and Maidan Sanat around midnight. Akbar Khorramdin stated that their motivation for the murder was the victim's mistreatment towards them and his apparently unfounded relationships with students.

On 19 May, Khorramdin's parents confessed that they had killed their son-in-law Faramarz and daughter Arezoo in the same way in 2011 and 2018, dismembering them and throwing their bodies in the trash. Lack of "morality" was the motivation behind killing their son-in-law, while the reason for their daughter's murder was described by them as "alcohol and drug use and affairs with strangers." According to officials, a licensed psychiatrist has confirmed the couple's mental well-being.

Akbar Khorramdin died of late-stage cancer during the criminal investigation phase. In 2022, Iran Mousavi Sani was sentenced to 45 months in prison for assisting in premeditated murder.

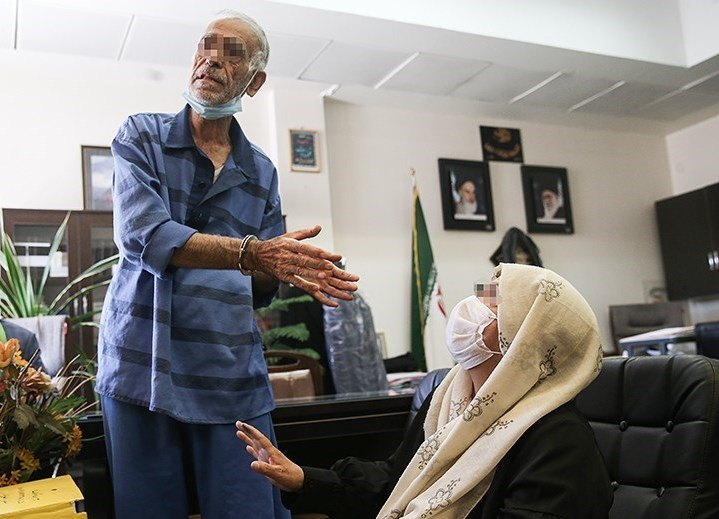
Babak Khorramdin's parents in the criminal court

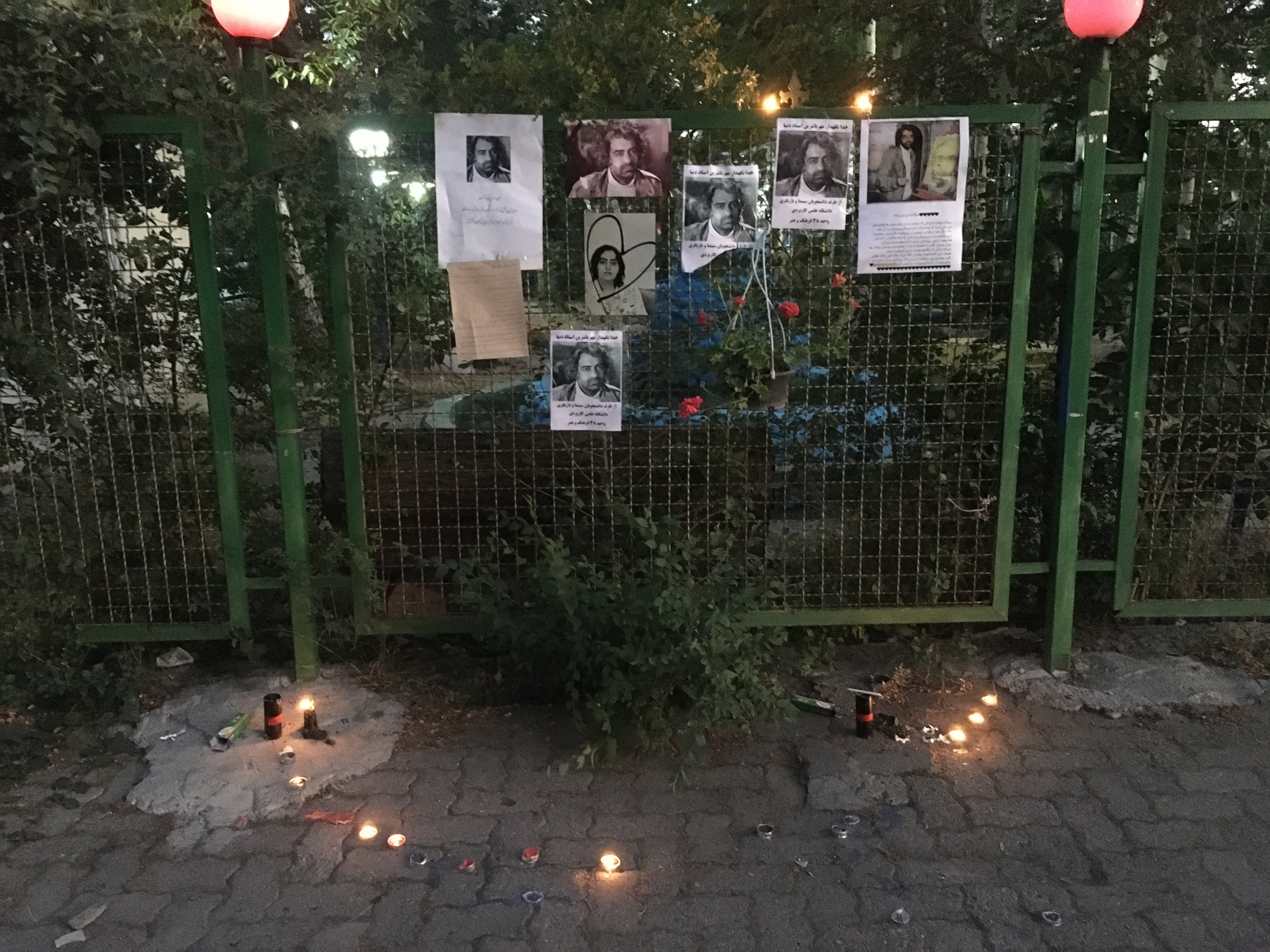
Tributes left on a wall in the Ekbatan district

== See also ==
- List of honor killings in Iran
