= Kuhestan, Kerman =

Kuhestan كوهستان
- Village
- Location within Iran
- Coordinates: 28°00′00″N 58°25′00″E
- Country: Iran
- Province: Kerman
- County: Rudbar-e Jonubi
- Bakhsh: Jazmurian
- Rural District: Kuhestan

Population (2006)
  - Total: 28
- Time zone: UTC+3:30 (IRST)
  - Summer (DST): UTC+4:30 (IRDT)

Kuhestan (Persian: كوهستان, also Romanized as Kūhestān; also known as Kūhestak) is a village in Kuhestan Rural District, Jazmurian District, Rudbar-e Jonubi County, Kerman Province, Iran. At the 2006 census, its population was 28, in 8 families.
