= Chubar =

City in Gilan province, Iran

Chubar Persian: چوبر
- City
- Location within Iran
- Coordinates: 38°10′44″N 48°53′34″E
- Country: Iran
- Province: Gilan
- County: Talesh
- District: Haviq

Population (2016)
  - Total: 5,554
- Time zone: UTC+3:30 (IRST)

Chubar (Persian: چوبر) (Note: Also romanized as Choobar, Chūbar, and Chūbor; also known as Chāhbēr) is a city in Haviq District of Talesh County, Gilan province, in northwestern Iran, serving as the administrative center for Chubar Rural District.

== Demographics ==
=== Language ===
Linguistic composition of the city.

Chubar linguistic composition
| language | percent |
| Talysh | 100% |

=== Population ===
At the time of the 2006 National Census, the city's population was 1,481 in 374 households. The following census in 2011 counted 5,522 people in 1,444 households. The 2016 census measured the population of the city as 5,554 people in 1,604 households.
