= Haviq =

City in Gilan province, Iran

Haviq Persian: حویق
- City
- Location within Iran
- Coordinates: 38°08′46″N 48°53′30″E
- Country: Iran
- Province: Gilan
- County: Talesh
- District: Haviq
- Established as a city: 2003

Population (2016)
  - Total: 4,261
- Time zone: UTC+3:30 (IRST)

Haviq (Persian: حویق) (Note: Also romanized as Ḩavīq; also known as Hevik) is a city in, and the capital of, Haviq District in Talesh County, Gilan province, Iran. It also serves as the administrative center for Haviq Rural District.

== History ==
In 2003, the village of Haviq merged with the villages of Aghasi (آغاسی), Bagh Shalu Mahalleh (باغ شلو محله), Bormah Saray-e Haviq (برمه سرای حویق), Owtar (او‌تار), Seydgah-e Haviq (صیدگاه حویق), and Suli Mahalleh (سولی محله) to become the city of Haviq.

== Demographics ==
=== Language ===
Linguistic composition of the city.

Haviq linguistic composition
| language | percent |
| Azerbaijani | 100% |

=== Population ===
At the time of the 2006 National Census, the city's population was 1,237 in 289 households. The census in 2011 counted 4,194 people in 978 households. The 2016 census measured the population of the city as 4,261 people in 1,169 households.
