= Chubar Rural District (Talesh County) =

Rural district in Gilan province, Iran

Chubar Rural District Persian: دهستان چوبر
- Rural District
- Location within Iran
- Coordinates: 38°13′N 48°50′E
- Country: Iran
- Province: Gilan
- County: Talesh
- District: Haviq
- Established: 2002
- Capital: Chubar

Population (2016)
  - Total: 14,299
- Time zone: UTC+3:30 (IRST)

Chubar Rural District (Persian: دهستان چوبر) is in Haviq District of Talesh County, Gilan province, Iran. It is administered from the city of Chubar.

== Demographics ==
=== Population ===
At the time of the 2006 National Census, the rural district's population was 16,429 in 3,700 households. There were 12,877 inhabitants in 3,380 households at the following census of 2011. The 2016 census measured the population of the rural district as 14,299 in 4,222 households. The most populous of its 56 villages was Viznah, with 3,022 people.

=== Other villages in the rural district ===
- Bala Mahalleh-ye Chubar
- Darvar Mahalleh
- Khalajlar
- Motal Sara
- Palasi
- Sefid Sangan
- Sholoqun
