= Haviq District =

District in Gilan province, Iran

Haviq District Persian: بخش حویق
- District
- Location within Iran
- Coordinates: 38°10′N 48°47′E
- Country: Iran
- Province: Gilan
- County: Talesh
- Established: 2002
- Capital: Haviq

Population (2016)
  - Total: 33,940
- Time zone: UTC+3:30 (IRST)

Haviq District (Persian: بخش حویق) is in Talesh County, Gilan province, in northwestern Iran. Its capital is the city of Haviq.

== Demographics ==
=== Population ===
At the time of the 2006 National Census, the district's population was 30,348 in 6,913 households. The census in 2011 counted 31,840 people in 8,289 households. The 2016 census measured the population of the district as 33,940 inhabitants in 9,929 households.

=== Administrative divisions ===
Haviq District Population
Administrative Divisions	2006	2011	2016
Chubar RD	16,429	12,877	14,299
Haviq RD (Note: Formerly Kargan Rud Rural District)	11,201	9,247	9,826
Chubar (city)	1,481	5,522	5,554
Haviq (city)	1,237	4,194	4,261
Total	30,348	31,840	33,940
RD = Rural District
