= Talesh County =

County in Gilan Province, Iran

Talesh County Persian: شهرستان تالش
- County
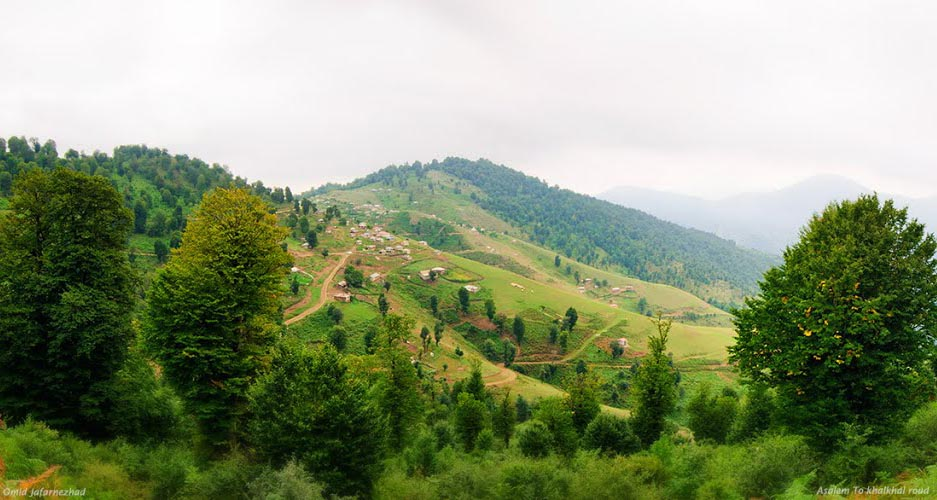
- Talesh County mountain landscape

- Location of Talesh County in Gilan province (top, green)

- Location of Gilan province in Iran
- Coordinates: 37°55′N 48°48′E
- Country: Iran
- Province: Gilan
- Capital: Tālesh
- Districts: Central, Asalem, Haviq, Jokandan, Kargan Rud

Population (2016)
  - Total: 200,649
- Time zone: UTC+3:30 (IRST)

Talesh County (Persian: شهرستان تالش) (Note: Also known as Tavalesh (طوالش)) is in Gilan province, in northwestern Iran. Its capital is the city of Tālesh. (Note: Also known as Hashtpar)

== History ==
The Talysh peoples are, as archaeological studies show, one of the oldest inhabitants of the western littoral Caspian Sea areas, which stretches from Dagestan in the north, to Iran in the south. The Talysh have lived in what are known as "Talysh land" for millennia, and are amongst the native inhabitants of what is today Iran and neighboring Azerbaijan. There is a belief amongst scholars, as well as by the Talysh themselves who generally identify with the Cadusii, that the ancient Cadusii are the ancestor of the today's Talysh.

The lands of the Talesh were much larger than the present day area. In olden times the geographical areas of the Talysh people was more than 10,000 km^{2}. At present the Taleshan live in Gilan Province, and some cities in Ardabil Province (Iran) and southeastern Azarbaijan.

The territory of Talesh County was a part of the Karganrud Khanate. After the Russo-Persian War, in order to weaken the influence of Mir Mostafa Khan, Fath 'Ali Shah divided the region among 5 local families, creating the Khamsa of Talesh.

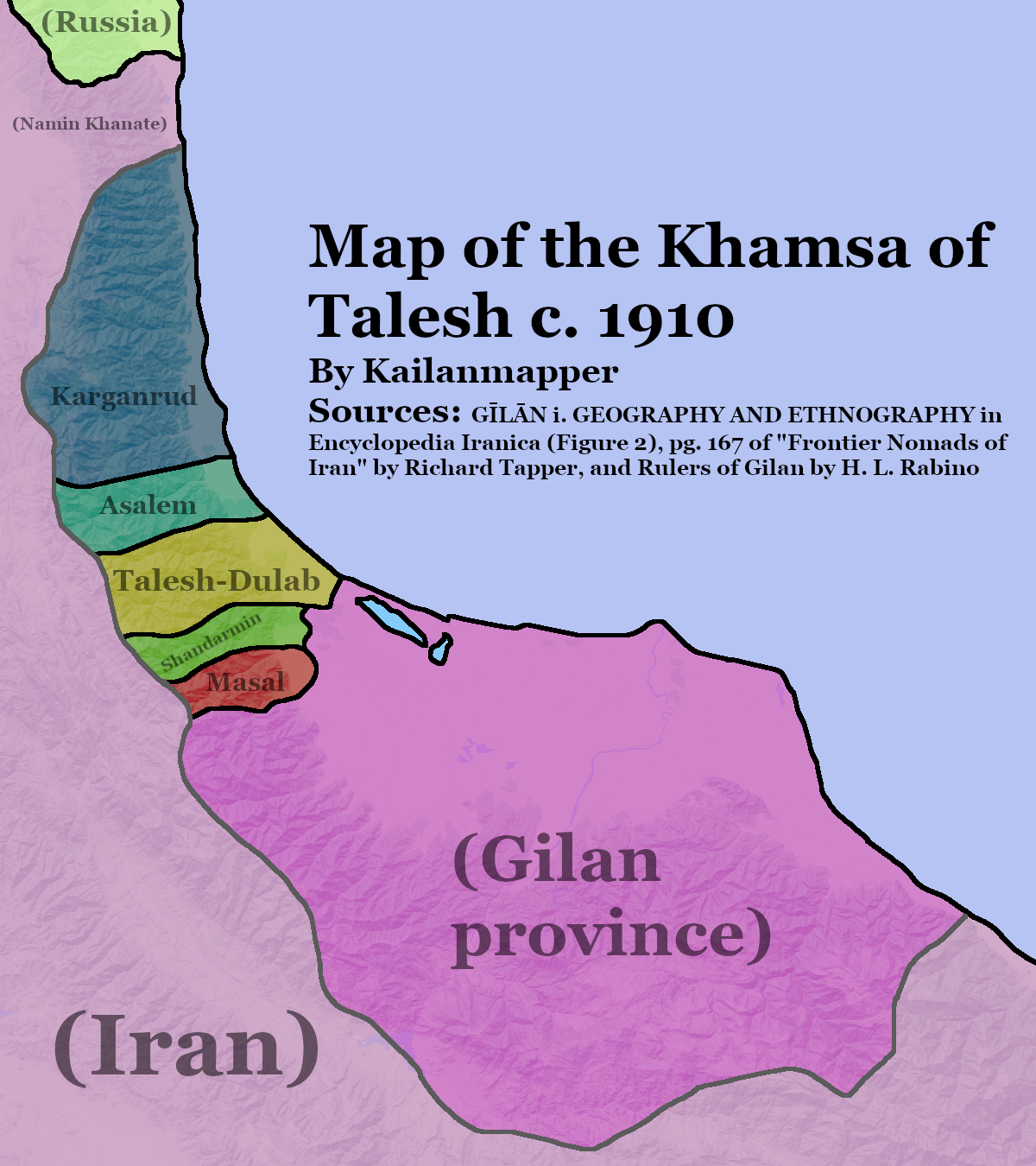
Map of the Khamsa of Talesh

In 2024, Saheli-ye Jokandan Rural District was separated from the Central District in the formation of Jokandan District, including the new Nilrud Rural District.

== Demographics ==
=== Languages ===
Generally speaking, the land of Talesh has been divided in three regions: Gaskarat (Masalli, Taskoh, Shanderman, Rezvashar, Hashtpar, Asalem, Astara); Foumanat (Fouman, Masoleh, and Shaft); and Azerbaijan Taloshian (Lankaran amongst others). In Gaskarat, the majority of people speak Taleshi and Farsi. In Foumanat, most speak Taleshi. Lastly, Talysh from neighboring Azerbaijan are often bilingual and trilingual, consisting of Taleshi, Azeri and Russian speakers.

Gilaki and Taleshi are rapidly losing ground in many cities of Tavalesh due to heavy immigration of people from Azerbaijan.

=== Religion ===
Talesh people at present are Sunni and Shia Muslims. Most of the southern and central Taleshian are Shia, and northern Taleshian are composed of both Shia and Sunni.

=== Population ===
At the time of the 2006 National Census, the county's population was 179,499 in 42,949 households. The following census in 2011 counted 189,933 people in 52,989 households. The 2016 census measured the population of the county as 200,649 in 61,055 households.

=== Administrative divisions ===
Talesh County's population history and administrative structure over three consecutive censuses are shown in the following table.

Talesh County Population
Administrative Divisions	2006	2011	2016
Central District	85,258	91,978	97,982
Kuhestani-ye Talesh RD	6,479	5,914	7,482
Saheli-ye Jokandan RD	18,232	18,515	19,442
Tula Rud RD	19,061	15,205	16,880
Tālesh (city)	41,486	52,344	54,178
Asalem District	39,089	40,569	42,219
Asalem RD	20,226	16,117	16,442
Khaleh Sara RD	6,930	7,495	7,702
Kharajgil RD	8,586	6,917	7,355
Asalem (city)	3,347	10,040	10,720
Haviq District	30,348	31,840	33,940
Chubar RD	16,429	12,877	14,299
Haviq RD (Note: Formerly Kargan Rud Rural District)	11,201	9,247	9,826
Chubar (city)	1,481	5,522	5,554
Haviq (city)	1,237	4,194	4,261
Jokandan District (Note: Established after the 2016 census)			
Nilrud RD			
Saheli-ye Jokandan RD			
Kargan Rud District	24,804	25,546	26,508
Khotbeh Sara RD	13,495	14,036	14,291
Lisar RD	8,710	8,248	8,570
Lisar (city)	2,599	3,262	3,647
Total	179,499	189,933	200,649
RD = Rural District

== Geography ==
Talesh is located on the southwestern coast of the Caspian Sea. Talesh County, covering an area of 2373 square kilometers, is ¼ of surface area of Gilan Province.

Talesh County has inland scenic areas in the Alborz mountain range, with intact natural habitats that are places for appreciating nature.

== Agriculture ==
Rice has been cultivated in this region for many years, where some indigenous cultivars (landrace) were conventionally bred by farmers.

== Historical monuments and natural sites ==
- Salsal village which goes back to Ismaeilieh era near Ghalehbin village located 15 km. from Talesh..
- White Mosque which dates from Seljukian era that situated at Hashtpar (Talesh) city .
- Agh-ev-lar region at a distance of 32 km of this city which is considered among the first grade tourist sites of the Iran.
- Asalem - Khalkhal road, and Laezeh countryside on the way to Khalkhal .
- Coasts of Kissom
- Loomer Waterfall
- Nasrollah Khan Sardar Amjad (Amidossaltaneh) Winter Quarters Castle - dates back to Qajar Era. It has eight sides.
- Nasrolah Khan Sardar Amjad (Amidossaltaneh) Summer Quarters Castle - in Aq Evlar Village.
- Three - Floor Tombs Around the Lighthouse (Atashkadeh), and Remnants of Mard Ali Bil.
- Aq Evlar Old Bath - located in a garden of Merian Village, built in Safavid Era ( 500 years ago).
- Soobatan countryside.
- Talesh Natural Park - covering an area of 80 acres (320,000 m^{2}).

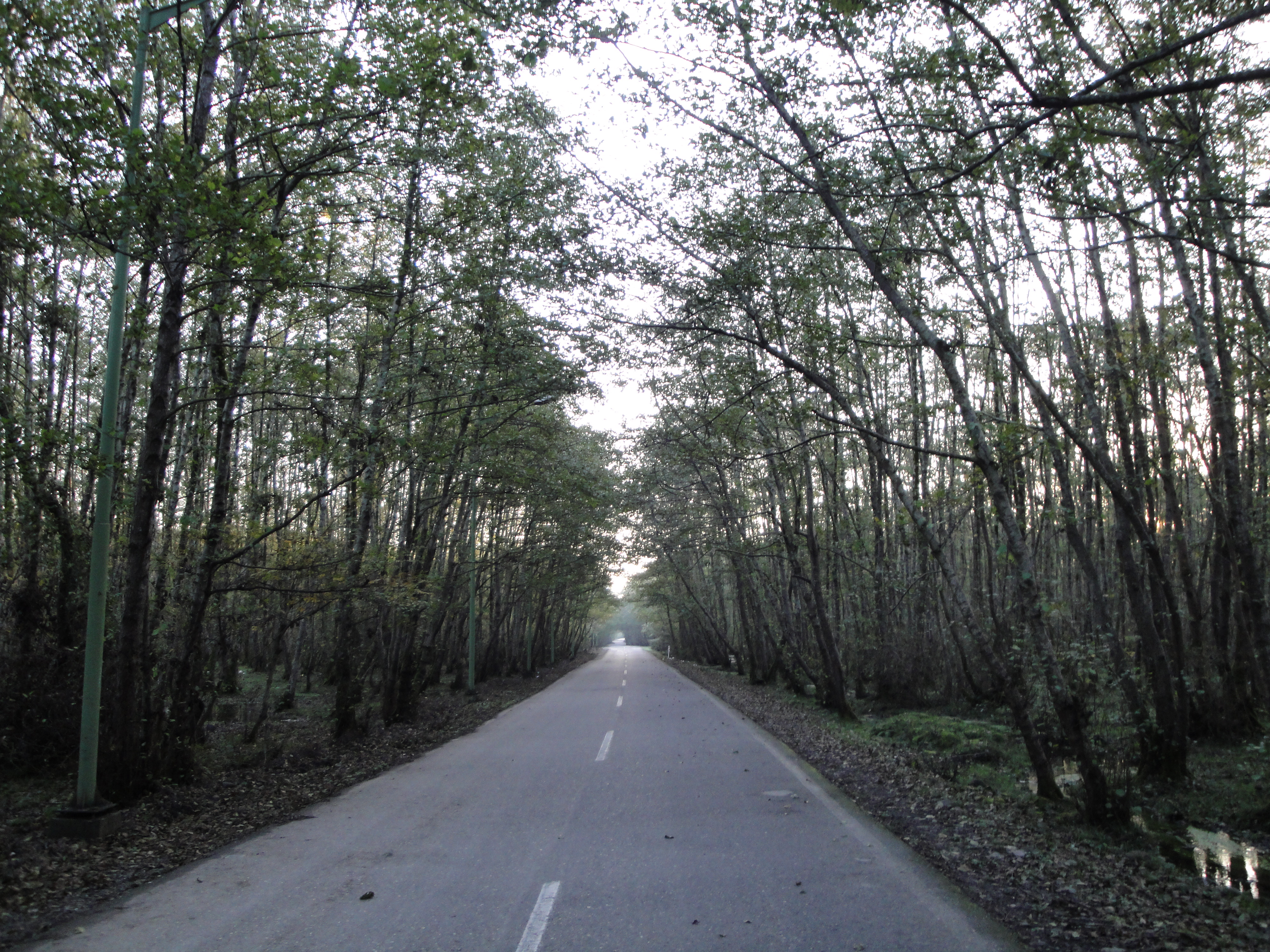
Gisoum forest road in Asalem, Gilan

== See also ==
Media related to Talesh County at Wikimedia Commons
