= Bala Mahalleh-ye Siah Belash =

Bala Mahalleh-ye Siah Belash بالامحله سياه بلاش
- Village
- Location within Iran
- Coordinates: 37°32′39″N 49°08′05″E
- Country: Iran
- Province: Gilan
- County: Rezvanshahr
- Bakhsh: Central
- Rural District: Gil Dulab

Population (2011)
  - Total: 53
- Time zone: UTC+3:30 (IRST)

Bala Mahalleh-ye Siah Belash (Persian: بالامحله سياه بلاش, also Romanized as Bālā Maḩalleh-ye Sīāh Belāsh; also known as Sīāh Belāsh) is a suburb of Rezvanshahr city and village in Gil Dulab Rural District, in the Central District of Rezvanshahr County, Gilan Province, Iran.

== Population ==
Siah Belash was a separate village at the 1966 census in Miandeh Rural District of Tavalesh County, with a population of 49 people in 8 households.

At the time of the 1976 census Siah Belash had a population of 199 people in 35 households. It did not appear in 1986 census results.

At the 2006 census, Bala Mahalleh's population was 53, in 14 families. The 2011 census recorded a population of 53, in 16 families. The 2016 census recorded a population of 0, as the residential area of Siah Belash became a neighborhood of Rezvanshahr city.
