= Siahbil =

Siahbil or Siah Bil (Persian: سياه بيل) may refer to:

- Siahbil, Gil Dulab, Rezvanshahr County
- Siah Bil, Khoshabar, Rezvanshahr County
- Siah Bil Khushaber, Rezvanshahr County
- Siah Bil, Talesh
