= Aqajan Mahalleh =

Aqajan Mahalleh اقاجان محله
- Village
- Location within Iran
- Coordinates: 37°29′52″N 49°04′34″E
- Country: Iran
- Province: Gilan
- County: Rezvanshahr
- Bakhsh: Central
- Rural District: Khoshabar

Population (2016)
  - Total: 53
- Time zone: UTC+3:30 (IRST)

Aqajan Mahalleh (Persian: اقاجان محله, also Romanized as Āqājān Maḩalleh) is a village in Khoshabar Rural District, in the Central District of Rezvanshahr County, Gilan Province, Iran.

At the time of the 2006 National Census, the village's population was 65 in 18 households. The following census in 2011 counted 58 people in 17 households. The 2016 census measured the population of the village as 53 people in 16 households.
