= Khalkhalian =

Khalkhalian (Persian: خلخاليان) may refer to:

- Khalkhalian, Rezvanshahr
- Khalkhalian, Talesh
