= Sangdeh-ye Pain =

Village in Gilan province, Iran

Sangdeh-ye Pain Persian: سنگده پائين
- Village
- Country: Iran
- Province: Gilan
- County: Rezvanshahr
- District: Pareh Sar
- Rural District: Dinachal

Population (2016)
  - Total: 642
- Time zone: UTC+3:30 (IRST)

Sangdeh-ye Pain (Persian: سنگده پائين) (Note: Also romanized as Sangdeh-ye Pā’īn) is a village in Dinachal Rural District of Pareh Sar District in Rezvanshahr County, Gilan province, Iran.

== Demographics ==
=== Population ===
The village did not appear in the 2006 National Census. The following census in 2011 counted 635 people in 181 households. The 2016 census measured the population of the village as 642 people in 208 households.
