= Punel =

Village in Gilan province, Iran

Punel Persian: پونل
- Village
- Location within Iran
- Coordinates: 37°31′43″N 49°06′49″E
- Country: Iran
- Province: Gilan
- County: Rezvanshahr
- District: Central
- Rural District: Khoshabar

Population (2016)
  - Total: 2,892
- Time zone: UTC+3:30 (IRST)

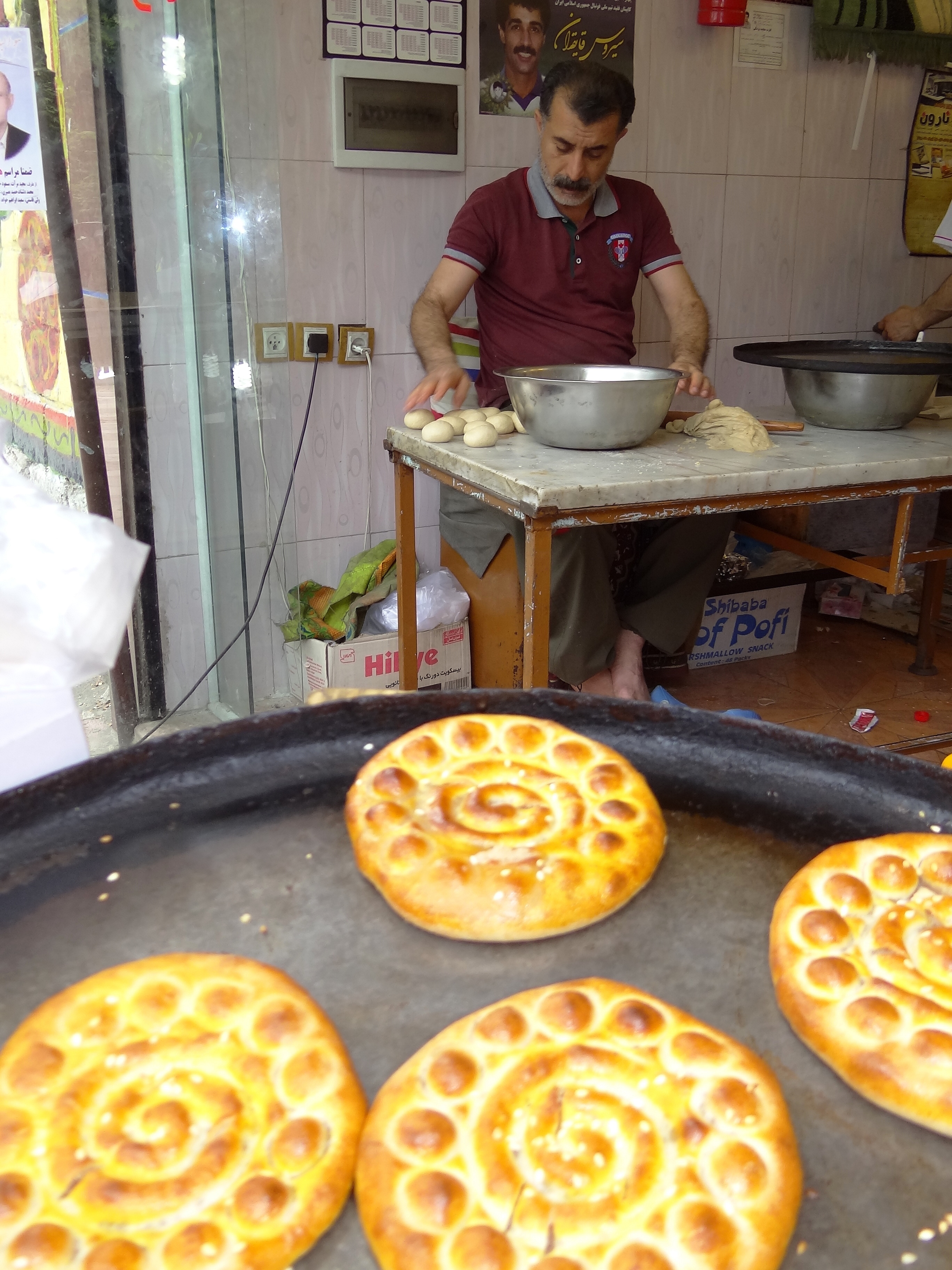
Bakery in Punel

Punel (Persian: پونل) (Note: Also romanized as Pūnel; also known as Pūnīl) is a village in Khoshabar Rural District of the Central District in Rezvanshahr County, Gilan province, Iran.

== Demographics ==
=== Population ===
At the time of the 2006 National Census, the village's population was 2,347 in 580 households. The following census in 2011 counted 2,850 people in 807 households. The 2016 census measured the population of the village as 2,892 people in 922 households. It was the most populous village in its rural district.
