= Shirbacheh Pir =

Shirbacheh Pir شيربچه پير
- Village
- Location within Iran
- Coordinates: 37°28′30″N 48°55′10″E
- Country: Iran
- Province: Gilan
- County: Rezvanshahr
- Bakhsh: Central
- Rural District: Khoshabar
- Elevation: 800–900 m (2,600–3,000 ft)

Population (2016)
  - Total: 107
- Time zone: UTC+3:30 (IRST)

Shirbacheh Pir (Persian: شيربچه پير, also Romanized as Shīrbacheh Pīr; also known as Shīrvacheh Pīr) is a village in Khoshabar Rural District, in the Central District of Rezvanshahr County, Gilan Province, Iran.

At the time of the 2006 National Census, the village's population was 75 in 19 households. The following census in 2011 counted 130 people in 41 households. The 2016 census measured the population of the village as 107 people in 36 households.
