= Kuhestan, Rezvanshahr =

Village in Gilan province, Iran

Kuhestan Persian: كوهستان
- Village
- Location within Iran
- Coordinates: 37°36′39″N 49°03′24″E
- Country: Iran
- Province: Gilan
- County: Rezvanshahr
- District: Pareh Sar
- Rural District: Dinachal

Population (2016)
  - Total: 1,872
- Time zone: UTC+3:30 (IRST)

Kuhestan (Persian: كوهستان) (Note: Also romanized as Kūhestān; also known as Kabūstān and Kūhestān-e Bālā) is a village in Dinachal Rural District of Pareh Sar District in Rezvanshahr County, Gilan province, Iran.

== Demographics ==
=== Population ===
At the time of the 2006 National Census, the village's population was 1,455 in 359 households. The following census in 2011 counted 1,806 people in 509 households. The 2016 census measured the population of the village as 1,872 people in 583 households.
