= Estehsar =

Astehsar آسته سر
- Village
- Location within Iran
- Coordinates: 37°27′06″N 49°03′17″E
- Country: Iran
- Province: Gilan
- County: Rezvanshahr
- Bakhsh: Central
- Rural District: Khoshabar

Population (2016)
  - Total: 136
- Time zone: UTC+3:30 (IRST)

Astehsar (Persian: آسته سر, also Romanized as Astehsar; also known as Estesar) is a village in Khoshabar Rural District, in the Central District of Rezvanshahr County, Gilan Province, Iran.

At the time of the 2006 National Census, the village's population was 138. The following census in 2011 counted 162 people in 51 households. The 2016 census measured the population of the village as 136 people in 48 households.
