= Mian Rud, Rezvanshahr =

Village in Gilan province, Iran

Mian Rud Persian: ميانرود
- Village
- Location within Iran
- Coordinates: 37°34′02″N 49°09′57″E
- Country: Iran
- Province: Gilan
- County: Rezvanshahr
- District: Central
- Rural District: Gil Dulab

Population (2016)
  - Total: 529
- Time zone: UTC+3:30 (IRST)

Mian Rud (Persian: ميانرود) (Note: Also romanized as Mīān Rūd; also known as Mīānrūd-e Bālā) is a village in Gil Dulab Rural District of the Central District in Rezvanshahr County, Gilan province, Iran.

== Demographics ==
=== Population ===
At the time of the 2006 National Census, the village's population was 502 in 132 households. The following census in 2011 counted 546 people in 156 households. The 2016 census measured the population of the village as 529 people in 168 households.
