= Janbeh Sara =

Village in Gilan province, Iran

Janbeh Sara Persian: جنبه سرا
- Village
- Location within Iran
- Coordinates: 37°34′25″N 49°03′34″E
- Country: Iran
- Province: Gilan
- County: Rezvanshahr
- District: Pareh Sar
- Rural District: Dinachal

Population (2016)
  - Total: 494
- Time zone: UTC+3:30 (IRST)

Janbeh Sara (Persian: جنبه سرا) (Note: Also romanized as Janbeh Sarā) is a village in Dinachal Rural District of Pareh Sar District in Rezvanshahr County, Gilan province, Iran.

== Demographics ==
=== Population ===
At the time of the 2006 National Census, the village's population was 699 in 166 households. The following census in 2011 counted 593 people in 156 households. The 2016 census measured the population of the village as 494 people in 151 households.
