= Baskeh Masham =

Baskeh Masham باسكه مشم
- Village
- Location within Iran
- Coordinates: 37°26′20″N 49°00′30″E
- Country: Iran
- Province: Gilan
- County: Rezvanshahr
- Bakhsh: Central
- Rural District: Khoshabar
- Elevation: 230 m (750 ft)

Population (2016)
  - Total: 31
- Time zone: UTC+3:30 (IRST)

Baskeh Masham (Persian: باسكه مشم, also Romanized as Bāskeh Masham; also known as Bāskeh Mastan and Yāskeh Mastan) is a village in Khoshabar Rural District, in the Central District of Rezvanshahr County, Gilan Province, Iran.

At the time of the 2006 National Census, the village's population was 64 in 16 households. The following census in 2011 counted 67 people in 19 households. The 2016 census measured the population of the village as 31 people in 10 households.
