= Sheykh Mahalleh, Rezvanshahr =

Sheykh Mahalleh شيخ محله
- Village
- Location within Iran
- Coordinates: 37°31′27″N 49°06′59″E
- Country: Iran
- Province: Gilan
- County: Rezvanshahr
- Bakhsh: Central
- Rural District: Khoshabar

Population (2016)
  - Total: 448
- Time zone: UTC+3:30 (IRST)

Sheykh Mahalleh (Persian: شيخ محله, also Romanized as Sheykh Maḩalleh; also known as Shaikh-Makhallekh) is a village in Khoshabar Rural District, in the Central District of Rezvanshahr County, Gilan Province, Iran.

At the time of the 2006 National Census, the village's population was 431 in 108 households. The following census in 2011 counted 492 people in 145 households. The 2016 census measured the population of the village as 448 people in 133 households.
