= Khalil Mahalleh, Gilan =

Khalil Mahalleh خليل محله
- Village
- Location within Iran
- Coordinates: 37°31′39″N 49°11′41″E
- Country: Iran
- Province: Gilan
- County: Rezvanshahr
- Bakhsh: Central
- Rural District: Gil Dulab

Population (2016)
  - Total: 189
- Time zone: UTC+3:30 (IRST)

Khalil Mahalleh (Persian: خليل محله, also Romanized as Khalīl Maḩalleh) is a village in Gil Dulab Rural District, in the Central District of Rezvanshahr County, Gilan Province, Iran.

At the time of the 2006 National Census, the village's population was 250 in 68 households. The 2016 census measured the population of the village as 189 people in 63 households.
