= Chekcheh Posht =

Village in Gilan province, Iran

Chekcheh Posht Persian: چكچه پشت
- Village
- Location within Iran
- Coordinates: 37°31′26″N 49°08′11″E
- Country: Iran
- Province: Gilan
- County: Rezvanshahr
- District: Central
- Rural District: Khoshabar

Population (2016)
  - Total: 1,095
- Time zone: UTC+3:30 (IRST)

Chekcheh Posht (Persian: چكچه پشت) (Note: Also known as Chegūjeh Posht, Chegūposht-e Bālā, and Chekūjeh Posht) is a village in Khoshabar Rural District of the Central District in Rezvanshahr County, Gilan province, Iran.

== Demographics ==
=== Population ===
At the time of the 2006 National Census, the village's population was 978 in 221 households. The following census in 2011 counted 957 people in 267 households. The 2016 census measured the population of the village as 1,095 people in 333 households.
