= Abuyar =

Village in Gilan province, Iran

Abuyar Persian: ابويار
- Village
- Location within Iran
- Coordinates: 37°34′47″N 49°01′18″E
- Country: Iran
- Province: Gilan
- County: Rezvanshahr
- District: Pareh Sar
- Rural District: Dinachal

Population (2016)
  - Total: 349
- Time zone: UTC+3:30 (IRST)

Abuyar (Persian: ابويار) (Note: Also romanized as Ābūyār) is a village in Dinachal Rural District of Pareh Sar District in Rezvanshahr County, Gilan province, Iran.

== Demographics ==
=== Population ===
At the time of the 2006 National Census, the village's population was 348 in 91 households. The following census in 2011 counted 388 people in 114 households. The 2016 census measured the population of the village as 349 people in 101 households.
