= Tazehabad, Rezvanshahr =

Village in Gilan province, Iran

Tazehabad Persian: تازه اباد
- Village
- Location within Iran
- Coordinates: 37°34′15″N 49°11′17″E
- Country: Iran
- Province: Gilan
- County: Rezvanshahr
- District: Central
- Rural District: Gil Dulab

Population (2016)
  - Total: 343
- Time zone: UTC+3:30 (IRST)

Tazehabad (Persian: تازه اباد) (Note: Also romanized as Tāzehābād; also known as Tazekhabad) is a village in Gil Dulab Rural District of the Central District in Rezvanshahr County, Gilan province, Iran.

== Demographics ==
=== Population ===
At the time of the 2006 National Census, the village's population was 397 in 110 households. The following census in 2011 counted 351 people in 107 households. The 2016 census measured the population of the village as 343 people in 116 households.
