= Sangdeh-ye Bala =

Village in Gilan province, Iran

Sangdeh-ye Bala Persian: سنگده بالا
- Village
- Country: Iran
- Province: Gilan
- County: Rezvanshahr
- District: Pareh Sar
- Rural District: Dinachal

Population (2016)
  - Total: 497
- Time zone: UTC+3:30 (IRST)

Sangdeh-ye Bala (Persian: سنگده بالا) (Note: Also romanized as Sangdeh-ye Bālā) is a village in Dinachal Rural District of Pareh Sar District in Rezvanshahr County, Gilan province, Iran.

== Demographics ==
=== Population ===
The village did not appear in the 2006 National Census. The following census in 2011 counted 490 people in 121 households. The 2016 census measured the population of the village as 497 people in 155 households.
