= Dashtansar =

Dashtansar دشتانسر
- Village
- Location within Iran
- Coordinates: 37°34′45″N 48°50′26″E
- Country: Iran
- Province: Gilan
- County: Rezvanshahr
- Bakhsh: Pareh Sar
- Rural District: Yeylaqi-ye Ardeh

Population (2016)
  - Total: 15
- Time zone: UTC+3:30 (IRST)

Dashtansar (Persian: دشتانسر, also Romanized as Dashtānsar; also known as Dashtūnsar) is a village in Yeylaqi-ye Ardeh Rural District, Pareh Sar District, Rezvanshahr County, Gilan Province, Iran.

At the time of the 2006 National Census, the village's population was 14 in 4 households. The following census in 2011 designated the village as a seasonal settlement with no permanent population, inhabited from April to October. The 2016 census measured the population of the village as 15 people in 6 households.
