= Ahangar Mahalleh, Gilan =

Ahangar Mahalleh آهنگرمحله
- Village
- Location within Iran
- Coordinates: 37°37′46″N 49°03′03″E
- Country: Iran
- Province: Gilan
- County: Rezvanshahr
- Bakhsh: Central
- Rural District: Khoshabar

Population (2016)
  - Total: 249
- Time zone: UTC+3:30 (IRST)

Ahangar Mahalleh (Persian: آهنگرمحله, also Romanized as Āhangar Maḩalleh) is a village in Khoshabar Rural District, in the Central District of Rezvanshahr County, Gilan Province, Iran.

At the time of the 2006 National Census, the village's population was 183 in 47 households. The following census in 2011 counted 183 people in 51 households. The 2016 census measured the population of the village as 249 people in 75 households.
