= Bodagh Mahalleh, Rezvanshahr =

Village in Gilan province, Iran

Bodagh Mahalleh Persian: بداغ محله
- Village
- Location within Iran
- Coordinates: 37°32′57″N 49°11′10″E
- Country: Iran
- Province: Gilan
- County: Rezvanshahr
- District: Central
- Rural District: Gil Dulab

Population (2016)
  - Total: 330
- Time zone: UTC+3:30 (IRST)

Bodagh Mahalleh (Persian: بداغ محله) (Note: Also romanized as Bodāgh Maḩalleh; formerly known as Bolagh Mahalleh (بلاغ محله), also romanized as Bolāgh Maḩalleh; also known as Budag Mahalleh, Būdāgh Maḩalleh, Budag-Makhallekh, and Būdāk Maḩalleh) is a village in Gil Dulab Rural District of the Central District in Rezvanshahr County, Gilan province, Iran.

== Demographics ==
=== Population ===
At the time of the 2006 National Census, the village's population, as Bolagh Mahalleh, was 345 in 90 households. The following census in 2011 counted 326 people in 84 households, by which time the village was listed as Bodagh Mahalleh. The 2016 census measured the population of the village as 330 people in 102 households.
