= Ardajan =

Village in Gilan province, Iran

Ardajan Persian: اردجان
- Village
- Location within Iran
- Coordinates: 37°34′26″N 49°06′42″E
- Country: Iran
- Province: Gilan
- County: Rezvanshahr
- District: Pareh Sar
- Rural District: Dinachal

Population (2016)
  - Total: 2,408
- Time zone: UTC+3:30 (IRST)

Ardajan (Persian: اردجان) (Note: Also romanized as Ardajān and Ardejān; also known as Ardeh Jān and Ardekhdzhan) is a village in Dinachal Rural District of Pareh Sar District in Rezvanshahr County, Gilan province, Iran.

== Demographics ==
=== Population ===
At the time of the 2006 National Census, the village's population was 5,522 in 1,441 households. The following census in 2011 counted 5,418 people in 1,497 households. The 2016 census measured the population of the village as 2,408 people in 737 households. It was the most populous village in its rural district.
