= Dilaj Mahalleh =

Village in Gilan province, Iran

Dilaj Mahalleh Persian: ديلج محله
- Village
- Location within Iran
- Coordinates: 37°30′58″N 49°10′31″E
- Country: Iran
- Province: Gilan
- County: Rezvanshahr
- District: Central
- Rural District: Gil Dulab

Population (2016)
  - Total: 1,057
- Time zone: UTC+3:30 (IRST)

Dilaj Mahalleh (Persian: ديلج محله) (Note: Also romanized as Dīlaj Maḩalleh; also known as Dīnaj Maḩalleh) is a village in Gil Dulab Rural District of the Central District in Rezvanshahr County, Gilan province, Iran.

== Demographics ==
=== Population ===
At the time of the 2006 National Census, the village's population was 957 in 211 households. The following census in 2011 counted 129 people in 32 households. The 2016 census measured the population of the village as 1,057 people in 330 households. It was the most populous village in its rural district.
