= Angulesh =

Angulesh انگولش
- Village
- Location within Iran
- Coordinates: 37°26′45″N 48°58′34″E
- Country: Iran
- Province: Gilan
- County: Rezvanshahr
- Bakhsh: Central
- Rural District: Khoshabar

Population (2016)
  - Total: 192
- Time zone: UTC+3:30 (IRST)

Angulesh (Persian: انگولش, also Romanized as Angūlesh) is a village in Khoshabar Rural District, in the Central District of Rezvanshahr County, Gilan Province, Iran.

At the time of the 2006 National Census, the village's population was 238 in 66 households. The following census in 2011 counted 162 people in 57 households. The 2016 census measured the population of the village as 192 people in 72 households.
