= Vazesht =

Vazesht وزشت
- Village
- Interactive map of Vazesht
- Coordinates: 37.519°N 49.037°E
- Country: Iran
- Province: Gilan
- County: Rezvanshahr
- Bakhsh: Central
- Rural District: Khoshabar
- Elevation: 200 m (660 ft)

Population (2016)
  - Total: 210
- Time zone: UTC+3:30 (IRST)

Vazesht (Persian: وزشت) is a village in Khoshabar Rural District, in the Central District of Rezvanshahr County, Gilan Province, Iran.

At the time of the 2006 National Census, the village's population was 149 in 39 households. The following census in 2011 counted 154 people in 49 households. The 2016 census measured the population of the village as 210 people in 68 households.
