= Banasar =

Banasar باناصر
- Village
- Interactive map of Banasar
- Coordinates: 37.512°N 49.02°E
- Country: Iran
- Province: Gilan
- County: Rezvanshahr
- Bakhsh: Central
- Rural District: Khoshabar

Population (2016)
  - Total: 14
- Time zone: UTC+3:30 (IRST)

Banasar (Persian: باناصر, also Romanized as Bānāṣar) is a village in Khoshabar Rural District, in the Central District of Rezvanshahr County, Gilan Province, Iran.

At the time of the 2006 National Census, the village's population was 33 in 8 households. The following census in 2011 counted 14 people in six households. The 2016 census measured the population of the village as 14 people in 5 households.
