= Mianrud, Pareh Sar =

Mianrud ميانرود
- Village
- Location within Iran
- Coordinates: 37°30′23″N 48°48′40″E
- Country: Iran
- Province: Gilan
- County: Rezvanshahr
- Bakhsh: Pareh Sar
- Rural District: Yeylaqi-ye Ardeh

Population (2016)
  - Total: 61
- Time zone: UTC+3:30 (IRST)

Mianrud (Persian: ميانرود, also romanized as Mīānrūd) is a village in Yeylaqi-ye Ardeh Rural District, Pareh Sar District, Rezvanshahr County, Gilan Province, Iran.

At the time of the 2006 National Census, the village's population was 111 in 24 households. The following census in 2011 counted 65 people in 21 households. The 2016 census measured the population of the village as 61 people in 23 households.
