= Sasan Sara =

Sasan Sara ساسانسرا
- Village
- Location within Iran
- Coordinates: 37°32′28″N 49°09′54″E
- Country: Iran
- Province: Gilan
- County: Rezvanshahr
- Bakhsh: Central
- Rural District: Gil Dulab

Population (2016)
  - Total: 284
- Time zone: UTC+3:30 (IRST)

Sasan Sara (Persian: ساسانسرا, also Romanized as Sāsān Sarā) is a village in Gil Dulab Rural District, in the Central District of Rezvanshahr County, Gilan Province, Iran.

At the time of the 2006 National Census, the village's population was 450 in 128 households. The following census in 2011 counted 332 people in 96 households. The 2016 census measured the population of the village as 284 people in 95 households.
