= Mazuposht =

Village in Gilan province, Iran

Mazuposht Persian: مازوپشت
- Village
- Country: Iran
- Province: Gilan
- County: Rezvanshahr
- District: Pareh Sar
- Rural District: Dinachal

Population (2016)
  - Total: 585
- Time zone: UTC+3:30 (IRST)

Mazuposht (Persian: مازوپشت) (Note: Also romanized as Māzūposht) is a village in Dinachal Rural District of Pareh Sar District in Rezvanshahr County, Gilan province, Iran.

== Demographics ==
=== Population ===
The village did not appear in the 2006 National Census. The following census in 2011 counted 521 people in 153 households. The 2016 census measured the population of the village as 545 people in 164 households.
