= Shadkuh =

Shadkuh شادكوه
- Village
- Location within Iran
- Coordinates: 37°35′47″N 49°08′44″E
- Country: Iran
- Province: Gilan
- County: Rezvanshahr
- Bakhsh: Central
- Rural District: Gil Dulab

Population (2016)
  - Total: 239
- Time zone: UTC+3:30 (IRST)

Shadkuh (Persian: شادكوه, also Romanized as Shādkūh; also known as Shākūh) is a village in Gil Dulab Rural District, in the Central District of Rezvanshahr County, Gilan Province, Iran.

At the time of the 2006 National Census, the village's population was 259 in 73 households. The following census in 2011 counted 227 people in 71 households. The 2016 census measured the population of the village as 239 people in 85 households.
