= Pilembera =

Village in Gilan province, Iran

Pilembera Persian: پيلمبرا
- Village
- Location within Iran
- Coordinates: 37°35′43″N 49°04′57″E
- Country: Iran
- Province: Gilan
- County: Rezvanshahr
- District: Pareh Sar
- Rural District: Dinachal

Population (2016)
  - Total: 263
- Time zone: UTC+3:30 (IRST)

Pilembera (Persian: پيلمبرا) (Note: Also romanized as Pīlam Barā and Pīlemberā also known as Pīlamīrah, Pilamirakh, Pīleh Mīreh, and Pīlemberā-ye Bālā) is a village in Dinachal Rural District of Pareh Sar District in Rezvanshahr County, Gilan province, Iran.

== Demographics ==
=== Population ===
At the time of the 2006 National Census, the village's population was 258 in 65 households. The following census in 2011 counted 176 people in 49 households. The 2016 census measured the population of the village as 263 people in 80 households.
