= Kheyl Gavan =

Kheyl Gavan خيلگاوان
- Village
- Location within Iran
- Coordinates: 37°28′32″N 48°53′11″E
- Country: Iran
- Province: Gilan
- County: Rezvanshahr
- Bakhsh: Central
- Rural District: Khoshabar

Population (2016)
  - Total: 24
- Time zone: UTC+3:30 (IRST)

Kheyl Gavan (Persian: خيلگاوان, also Romanized as Kheyl Gāvān) is a village in Khoshabar Rural District, in the Central District of Rezvanshahr County, Gilan Province, Iran.

At the time of the 2006 National Census, the village's population was 27 in 8 households. The following census in 2011 counted 27 people in 10 households. The 2016 census measured the population of the village as 24 people in 10 households.
