= Shafa Rud =

Shafa Rud شفارود
- Village
- Location within Iran
- Coordinates: 37°35′37″N 49°09′02″E
- Country: Iran
- Province: Gilan
- County: Rezvanshahr
- Bakhsh: Central
- Rural District: Gil Dulab

Population (2016)
  - Total: 207
- Time zone: UTC+3:30 (IRST)

Shafa Rud (Persian: شفارود, also Romanized as Shafā Rūd; also known as Reshteh-e-Tālesh, Shiffarūd, and Sīāh Rūd) is a coastal village in Gil Dulab Rural District, in the Central District of Rezvanshahr County, Gilan Province, Iran. It was named after the Shafarud river that reaches the Caspian Sea near the village.

At the time of the 2006 National Census, the village's population was 255 in 72 households. The following census in 2011 counted 203 people in 70 households. The 2016 census measured the population of the village as 207 people in 72 households.
