= Dasht Daman =

Dasht Daman دشت دامن, دشتَ دومَن
- Village
- Location within Iran
- Coordinates: 37°28′02″N 48°47′05″E
- Country: Iran
- Province: Gilan
- County: Rezvanshahr
- Bakhsh: Pareh Sar
- Rural District: Yeylaqi-ye Ardeh

Population (2016)
  - Total: 42
- Time zone: UTC+3:30 (IRST)

Dasht Daman (Persian: دشت دامن, also Romanized as Dasht Dāman ٫ Dasht Dooman) is a village in Yeylaqi-ye Ardeh Rural District of Rezvanshahr County, Gilan Province, Iran.

At the time of the 2006 National Census, the village's population was 25 in 7 households. The following census in 2011 counted 24 people in 8 households. The 2016 census measured the population of the village as 42 people in 14 households.
