= Charvadeh =

Village in Gilan province, Iran

Charvadeh Persian: چروده
- Village
- Location within Iran
- Coordinates: 37°32′57″N 48°51′21″E
- Country: Iran
- Province: Gilan
- County: Rezvanshahr
- District: Pareh Sar
- Rural District: Yeylaqi-ye Ardeh

Population (2016)
  - Total: 239
- Time zone: UTC+3:30 (IRST)

Charvadeh (Persian: چروده) (Note: Also romanized as Cherū Deh; also known as Charvadeh-e Pā‘īn) is a village in Yeylaqi-ye Ardeh Rural District of Pareh Sar District in Rezvanshahr County, Gilan province, Iran.

== Demographics ==
=== Population ===
At the time of the 2006 National Census, the village's population was 186 in 44 households. The following census in 2011 counted 164 people in 52 households. The 2016 census measured the population of the village as 239 people in 68 households.
