= Diansar =

Diansar ديانسر
- Village
- Location within Iran
- Coordinates: 37°33′15″N 48°53′14″E
- Country: Iran
- Province: Gilan
- County: Rezvanshahr
- Bakhsh: Pareh Sar
- Rural District: Yeylaqi-ye Ardeh

Population (2006)
  - Total: 29
- Time zone: UTC+3:30 (IRST)

Diansar (Persian: ديانسر, also Romanized as Dīānsar; also known as Dīāmūnsar and Vīānsar) is a village in Yeylaqi-ye Ardeh Rural District, Pareh Sar District, Rezvanshahr County, Gilan Province, Iran.

At the time of the 2006 National Census, the village's population was 29 in 6 households. The following census in 2011 counted less than 4 households. The 2016 census measured less than 4 households.
