= Razdar, Gilan =

Razdar رزدار
- Village
- Location within Iran
- Coordinates: 37.476°N 49.048°E
- Country: Iran
- Province: Gilan
- County: Rezvanshahr
- Bakhsh: Central
- Rural District: Khoshabar
- Elevation: 280 m (920 ft)

Population (2016)
  - Total: 148
- Time zone: UTC+3:30 (IRST)

Razdar (Persian: رزدار, also Romanized as Razdār; also known as Razdārū) is a village in Khoshabar Rural District, in the Central District of Rezvanshahr County, Gilan Province, Iran.

At the time of the 2006 National Census, the village's population was 137 in 35 households. The following census in 2011 counted 61 people in 20 households. The 2016 census measured the population of the village as 148 people in 51 households.
