= Rudsar, Rezvanshahr =

Rud Sar رودسر
- Village
- Location within Iran
- Coordinates: 37°34′15″N 49°11′18″E
- Country: Iran
- Province: Gilan
- County: Rezvanshahr
- Bakhsh: Central
- Rural District: Gil Dulab

Population (2016)
  - Total: 266
- Time zone: UTC+3:30 (IRST)

Rudsar or Rud Sar (Persian: رودسر, also Romanized as Rūd Sar and Rud-Sar; also known as Rūdsar-e Tāzehābād and Rūdsar Tāzehābād) is a coastal village in Gil Dulab Rural District, in the Central District of Rezvanshahr County, Gilan Province, Iran.

At the time of the 2006 National Census, the village's population was 311 in 101 households. The following census in 2011 counted 248 people in 79 households. The 2016 census measured the population of the village as 266 people in 103 households.
