= Lakta Sara =

Lakta Sara لاكتاسرا
- Village
- Location within Iran
- Coordinates: 37°33′19″N 49°09′09″E
- Country: Iran
- Province: Gilan
- County: Rezvanshahr
- Bakhsh: Central
- Rural District: Gil Dulab

Population (2016)
  - Total: 234
- Time zone: UTC+3:30 (IRST)

Lakta Sara (Persian: لاكتاسرا, also Romanized as Lāktār Sarā) is a village in Gil Dulab Rural District, in the Central District of Rezvanshahr County, Gilan Province, Iran.

At the time of the 2006 National Census, the village's population was 423 in 97 households. The following census in 2011 counted 408 people in 105 households. The 2016 census measured the population of the village as 234 people in 72 households.
