= Now Kandeh, Gilan =

Village in Gilan province, Iran

Now Kandeh Persian: نوكنده
- Village
- Location within Iran
- Coordinates: 37°36′06″N 49°06′52″E
- Country: Iran
- Province: Gilan
- County: Rezvanshahr
- District: Pareh Sar
- Rural District: Dinachal

Population (2016)
  - Total: 750
- Time zone: UTC+3:30 (IRST)

Now Kandeh (Persian: نوكنده) (Note: Also romanized as Naukandeh; also known as Naukandekh and Nowkandeh-ye Kūchek) is a village in Dinachal Rural District of Pareh Sar District in Rezvanshahr County, Gilan province, Iran.

== Demographics ==
=== Population ===
At the time of the 2006 National Census, the village's population was 1,071 in 293 households. The following census in 2011 counted 778 people in 240 households. The 2016 census measured the population of the village as 750 people in 261 households.
