= Simbari Khaleh =

Village in Gilan province, Iran

Simbari Khaleh Persian: سيمبري خاله
- Village
- Location within Iran
- Coordinates: 37°38′39″N 49°03′55″E
- Country: Iran
- Province: Gilan
- County: Rezvanshahr
- District: Pareh Sar
- Rural District: Dinachal

Population (2016)
  - Total: 536
- Time zone: UTC+3:30 (IRST)

Simbari Khaleh (Persian: سيمبري خاله) (Note: Also romanized as Sīmbarī Khāleh; also known as Sīmbar Khāleh and Sīmbar Khāleh-ye Pā’īn) is a village in Dinachal Rural District of Pareh Sar District in Rezvanshahr County, Gilan province, Iran.

== Demographics ==
=== Population ===
At the time of the 2006 National Census, the village's population was 517 in 112 households. The following census in 2011 counted 491 people in 160 households. The 2016 census measured the population of the village as 536 people in 180 households.
