= Yeylaqi-ye Ardeh Rural District =

Rural district in Gilan province, Iran

Yeylaqi-ye Ardeh Rural District Persian: دهستان ييلاقی ارده
- Rural District
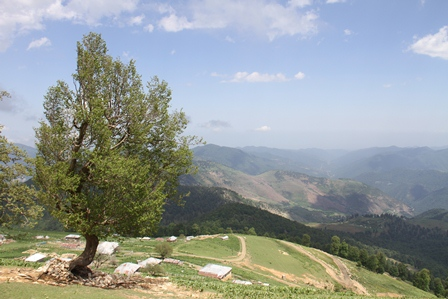
- Barz Kuh Mountain in the rural district

- Location within Iran
- Coordinates: 37°30′N 48°50′E
- Country: Iran
- Province: Gilan
- County: Rezvanshahr
- District: Pareh Sar
- Established: 1987
- Capital: Ardeh

Population (2016)
  - Total: 3,538
- Time zone: UTC+3:30 (IRST)

Yeylaqi-ye Ardeh Rural District (Persian: دهستان ييلاقی ارده) is in Pareh Sar District of Rezvanshahr County, Gilan province, Iran. Its capital is the village of Ardeh.

== Demographics ==
=== Population ===
At the time of the 2006 National Census, the rural district's population was 2,518 in 636 households. There were 2,379 inhabitants in 780 households at the following census of 2011. The 2016 census measured the population of the rural district as 3,538 in 1,135 households. The most populous of its 34 villages was Ardeh, with 682 people.

=== Other villages in the rural district ===
- Aq Masjed
- Bargam
- Charvadeh
- Dasht Daman
- Dashtansar
- Diansar
- Khojeh Darreh
- Kohneh Keh
- Kureh Rudbar
- Latum
- Mianrud
- Now Deh
- Razdarestan
- Rowshan Deh
- Sangdeh
- Siah Larz
- Visadar
- Zendaneh
