= Owrma =

Village in Gilan province, Iran

Owrma Persian: اورما
- Village
- Location within Iran
- Coordinates: 37°26′55″N 49°01′24″E
- Country: Iran
- Province: Gilan
- County: Rezvanshahr
- District: Central
- Rural District: Khoshabar
- Elevation: 380 m (1,250 ft)

Population (2016)
  - Total: 813
- Time zone: UTC+3:30 (IRST)

Owrma (Persian: اورما) (Note: Also romanized as Owrmā) is a village in Khoshabar Rural District of the Central District in Rezvanshahr County, Gilan province, Iran.

== Demographics ==
=== Population ===
At the time of the 2006 National Census, the village's population was 882 in 216 households. The following census in 2011 counted 717 people in 212 households. The 2016 census measured the population of the village as 813 people in 249 households.
