= Changarian =

Village in Gilan province, Iran

Changarian Persian: چنگريان
- Village
- Location within Iran
- Coordinates: 37°32′03″N 49°09′45″E
- Country: Iran
- Province: Gilan
- County: Rezvanshahr
- District: Central
- Rural District: Gil Dulab

Population (2016)
  - Total: 536
- Time zone: UTC+3:30 (IRST)

Changarian (Persian: چنگريان) (Note: Also romanized as Changarīān, Changereyān, and Changerīān; also known as Changīzīān and Chingiran) is a village in Gil Dulab Rural District of the Central District in Rezvanshahr County, Gilan province, Iran.

== Demographics ==
=== Population ===
At the time of the 2006 National Census, the village's population was 410 in 108 households. The following census in 2011 counted 579 people in 171 households. The 2016 census measured the population of the village as 536 people in 175 households.
