= Shishar =

Shishar شيشار
- Village
- Location within Iran
- Coordinates: 37°31′09″N 49°03′26″E
- Country: Iran
- Province: Gilan
- County: Rezvanshahr
- Bakhsh: Central
- Rural District: Khoshabar
- Elevation: 180 m (590 ft)

Population (2016)
  - Total: 105
- Time zone: UTC+3:30 (IRST)

Shishar (Persian: شيشار, also Romanized as Shīshār) is a village in Khoshabar Rural District, in the Central District of Rezvanshahr County, Gilan Province, Iran.

At the time of the 2006 National Census, the village's population was 165 in 44 households. The following census in 2011 counted 157 people in 52 households. The 2016 census measured the population of the village as 105 people in 39 households.
