= Dinachal =

Village in Gilan province, Iran

Dinachal Persian: ديناچال
- Village
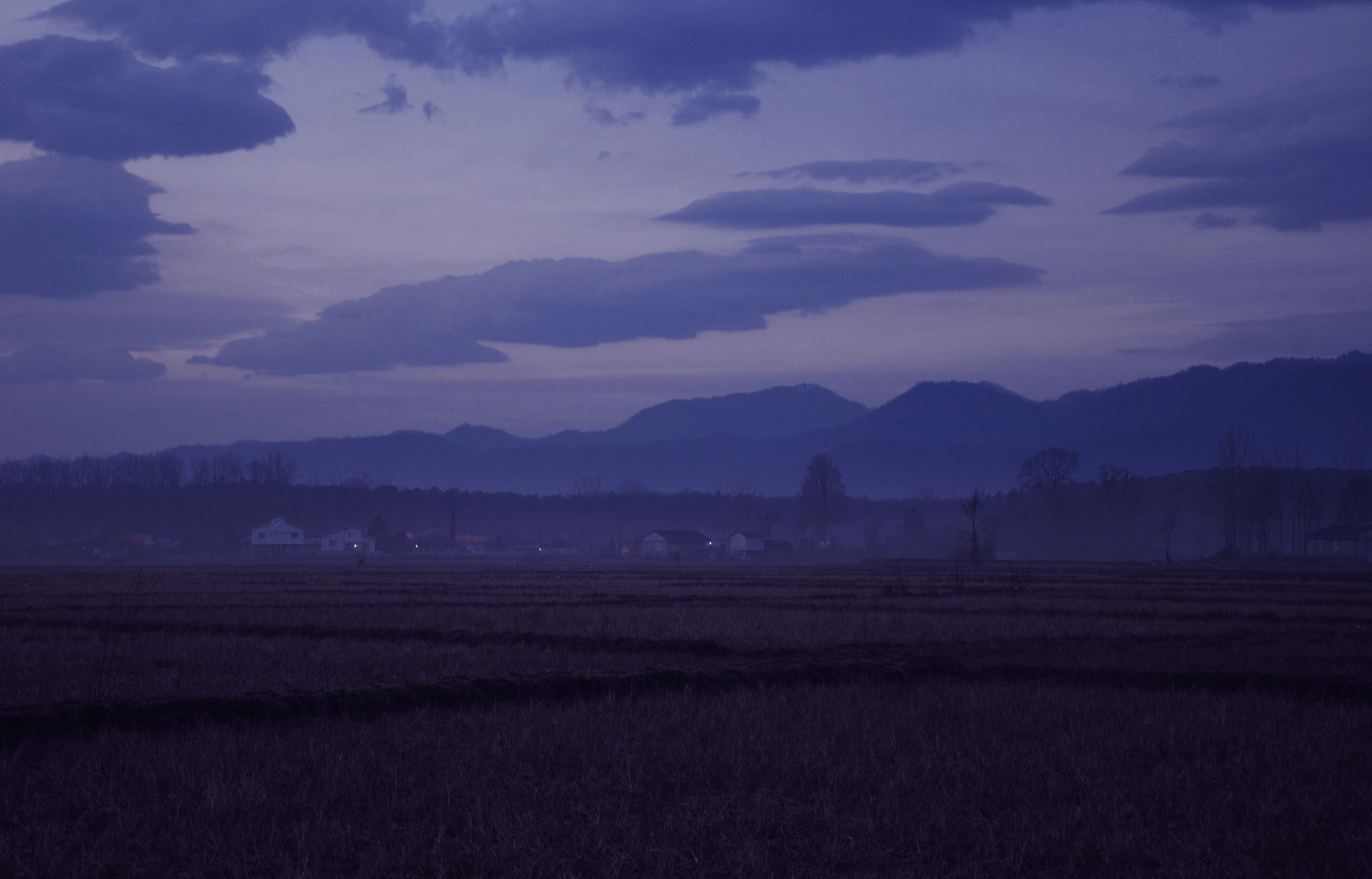

- Location within Iran
- Coordinates: 37°39′44″N 49°03′13″E
- Country: Iran
- Province: Gilan
- County: Rezvanshahr
- District: Pareh Sar
- Rural District: Dinachal

Population (2016)
  - Total: 474
- Time zone: UTC+3:30 (IRST)

Dinachal (Persian: ديناچال) (Note: Also romanized as Dīnāchāl; also known as Denyā Chāl) is a village in, and the capital of, Dinachal Rural District in Pareh Sar District of Rezvanshahr County, Gilan province, Iran.

== Demographics ==
=== Population ===
At the time of the 2006 National Census, the village's population was 452 in 111 households. The following census in 2011 counted 447 people in 127 households. The 2016 census measured the population of the village as 474 people in 142 households.
