= Palang Pareh =

Palang Pareh پلنگ پاره
- Village
- Location within Iran
- Coordinates: 37°32′02″N 49°04′20″E
- Country: Iran
- Province: Gilan
- County: Rezvanshahr
- Bakhsh: Central
- Rural District: Khoshabar

Population (2016)
  - Total: 321
- Time zone: UTC+3:30 (IRST)

Palang Pareh (Persian: پلنگ پاره, also Romanized as Palang Pāreh) is a village in Khoshabar Rural District, in the Central District of Rezvanshahr County, Gilan Province, Iran.

At the time of the 2006 National Census, the village's population was 63 in 15 households. The following census in 2011 counted 51 people in 17 households. The 2016 census measured the population of the village as 321 people in 105 households.
