= Rinch Mahalleh =

Village in Gilan province, Iran

Rinch Mahalleh Persian: رينچ محله
- Village
- Location within Iran
- Coordinates: 37°30′32″N 49°09′47″E
- Country: Iran
- Province: Gilan
- County: Rezvanshahr
- District: Central
- Rural District: Khoshabar

Population (2016)
  - Total: 500
- Time zone: UTC+3:30 (IRST)

Rinch Mahalleh (Persian: رينچ محله) (Note: Also romanized as Rīnch Maḩalleh) is a village in Khoshabar Rural District of the Central District in Rezvanshahr County, Gilan province, Iran.

== Demographics ==
=== Population ===
At the time of the 2006 National Census, the village's population was 507 in 128 households. The following census in 2011 counted 550 people in 139 households. The 2016 census measured the population of the village as 500 people in 154 households.
