= Zendaneh =

Zendaneh زندانه
- Village
- Location within Iran
- Coordinates: 37°32′25″N 48°44′42″E
- Country: Iran
- Province: Gilan
- County: Rezvanshahr
- Bakhsh: Pareh Sar
- Rural District: Yeylaqi-ye Ardeh

Population (2016)
  - Total: 137
- Time zone: UTC+3:30 (IRST)

Zendaneh (Persian: زندانه, also Romanized as Zendāneh) is a village in Yeylaqi-ye Ardeh Rural District, Pareh Sar District, Rezvanshahr County, Gilan Province, Iran. At the time of the 2016 National Census, the village's population was 137 in 47 households.
