= Kheymeh Sar =

Village in Gilan province, Iran

Kheymeh Sar Persian: خيمه سر
- Village
- Location within Iran
- Coordinates: 37°35′29″N 49°09′35″E
- Country: Iran
- Province: Gilan
- County: Rezvanshahr
- District: Central
- Rural District: Gil Dulab

Population (2016)
  - Total: 396
- Time zone: UTC+3:30 (IRST)

Kheymeh Sar (Persian: خيمه سر) (Note: Also romanized as Khīmah Sar) is a village in Gil Dulab Rural District of the Central District in Rezvanshahr County, Gilan province, Iran.

== Demographics ==
=== Population ===
At the time of the 2006 National Census, the village's population was 496 in 125 households. The following census in 2011 counted 442 people in 134 households. The 2016 census measured the population of the village as 396 people in 144 households.
