= Razdarestan =

Razdarestan رزدارستان
- village
- Location within Iran
- Coordinates: 37°26′41″N 48°52′31″E
- Country: Iran
- Province: Gilan
- County: Rezvanshahr
- Bakhsh: Central
- Rural District: Khoshabar Rural District

Population (2016)
  - Total: 39
- Time zone: UTC+3:30 (IRST)

Razdarestan (Persian: رزدارستان, also Romanized as Razdārestān; also known as Razrestān) is a village in Khoshabar Rural District, Central District of Rezvanshahr County, Gilan Province, Iran.

At the time of the 2006 National Census, the village's population was 34 in 9 households. The following census in 2011 counted 20 people in 6 households. The 2016 census measured the population of the village as 39 people in 14 households.
