= Siah Larz =

Siah Larz سياه لرز
- Village
- Location within Iran
- Coordinates: 37°30′53″N 48°49′29″E
- Country: Iran
- Province: Gilan
- County: Rezvanshahr
- Bakhsh: Pareh Sar
- Rural District: Yeylaqi-ye Ardeh

Population (2016)
  - Total: 84
- Time zone: UTC+3:30 (IRST)

Siah Larz (Persian: سياه لرز, also Romanized as Sīāh Larz) is a village in Yeylaqi-ye Ardeh Rural District, Pareh Sar District, Rezvanshahr County, Gilan Province, Iran.

At the time of the 2006 National Census, the village's population was 78 in 21 households. The following census in 2011 counted 84 people in 24 households. The 2016 census measured the population of the village as 84 people in 28 households.
