= Rud Kenar =

Village in Gilan province, Iran

Rud Kenar Persian: رودكنار
- Village
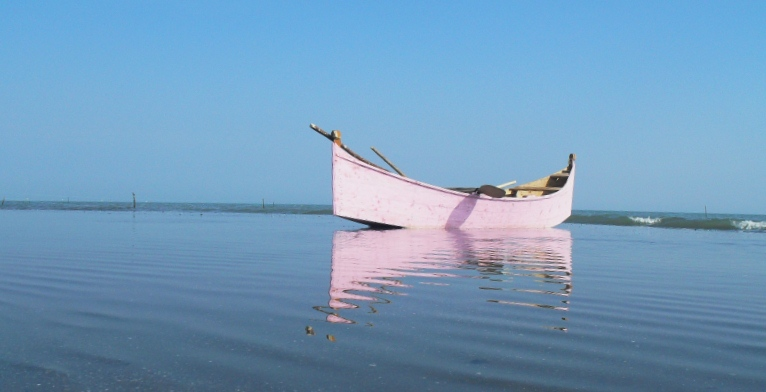
- Caspian Sea at Rud Kenar

- Location within Iran
- Coordinates: 37°38′07″N 49°04′11″E
- Country: Iran
- Province: Gilan
- County: Rezvanshahr
- District: Pareh Sar
- Rural District: Dinachal

Population (2016)
  - Total: 529
- Time zone: UTC+3:30 (IRST)

Rud Kenar (Persian: رودكنار) (Note: Also romanized as Rūd Kenār; also known as Rud-Kinar) is a village in Dinachal Rural District of Pareh Sar District in Rezvanshahr County, Gilan province, Iran.

== Demographics ==
=== Population ===
At the time of the 2006 National Census, the village's population was 556 in 136 households. The following census in 2011 counted 534 people in 147 households. The 2016 census measured the population of the village as 529 people in 167 households.
