= Dar Sara =

Village in Gilan province, Iran

Dar Sara Persian: دارسرا
- Village
- Location within Iran
- Coordinates: 37°31′33″N 49°11′13″E
- Country: Iran
- Province: Gilan
- County: Rezvanshahr
- District: Central
- Rural District: Gil Dulab

Population (2016)
  - Total: 614
- Time zone: UTC+3:30 (IRST)

Dar Sara (Persian: دارسرا) (Note: Also romanized as Dār Sarā; also known as Darisara and Torasara) is a village in, and the capital of, Gil Dulab Rural District in the Central District of Rezvanshahr County, Gilan province, Iran.

== Demographics ==
=== Population ===
At the time of the 2006 National Census, the village's population was 624 in 193 households. The following census in 2011 counted 613 people in 190 households. The 2016 census measured the population of the village as 614 people in 205 households.
