= Alan, Gilan =

Alan آلان
- Village
- Location within Iran
- Coordinates: 37°30′35″N 49°08′41″E
- Country: Iran
- Province: Gilan
- County: Rezvanshahr
- Bakhsh: Central
- Rural District: Khoshabar

Population (2006)
  - Total: 197
- Time zone: UTC+3:30 (IRST)

Alan (Persian: آلان, also Romanized as Alān) is a village in Khoshabar Rural District, in the Central District of Rezvanshahr County, Gilan Province, Iran.

At the time of the 2006 National Census, the village's population was 195 in 56 households. The following census in 2011 counted 187 people in 48 households. The 2016 census measured the population of the village as 197 people in 70 households.
