= Alkam =

Village in Gilan province, Iran

Alkam Persian: الكام
- Village
- Location within Iran
- Coordinates: 37°37′25″N 49°05′02″E
- Country: Iran
- Province: Gilan
- County: Rezvanshahr
- District: Pareh Sar
- Rural District: Dinachal

Population (2016)
  - Total: 1,276
- Time zone: UTC+3:30 (IRST)

Alkam (Persian: الكام) (Note: Also romanized as Ālkām; also known as Ālkām-e Lotowm) is a village in Dinachal Rural District of Pareh Sar District in Rezvanshahr County, Gilan province, Iran.

== Demographics ==
=== Population ===
At the time of the 2006 National Census, the village's population was 1,733 in 450 households. The following census in 2011 counted 1,786 people in 509 households. The 2016 census measured the population of the village as 1,276 people in 407 households.
