= Rudbar Sara, Rezvanshahr =

Village in Gilan province, Iran

Rudbar Sara Persian: رودبارسرا
- Village
- Location within Iran
- Coordinates: 37°30′25″N 49°06′08″E
- Country: Iran
- Province: Gilan
- County: Rezvanshahr
- District: Central
- Rural District: Khoshabar
- Elevation: 100 m (330 ft)

Population (2016)
  - Total: 2,552
- Time zone: UTC+3:30 (IRST)

Rudbar Sara (Persian: رودبارسرا) (Note: Also romanized as Rūdbār Sarā) is a village in Khoshabar Rural District of the Central District in Rezvanshahr County, Gilan province, Iran.

== Demographics ==
=== Population ===
At the time of the 2006 National Census, the village's population was 2,358 in 582 households. The following census in 2011 counted 2,635 people in 748 households. The 2016 census measured the population of the village as 2,552 people in 820 households.
