= Kalab, Gilan =

Village in Gilan province, Iran

Kalab Persian: كلاب
- Village
- Location within Iran
- Coordinates: 37°37′08″N 49°00′09″E
- Country: Iran
- Province: Gilan
- County: Rezvanshahr
- District: Pareh Sar
- Rural District: Dinachal

Population (2016)
  - Total: 171
- Time zone: UTC+3:30 (IRST)

Kalab (Persian: كلاب) (Note: Also romanized as Kalāb) is a village in Dinachal Rural District of Pareh Sar District in Rezvanshahr County, Gilan province, Iran.

== Demographics ==
=== Population ===
At the time of the 2006 National Census, the village's population was 183 in 44 households. The following census in 2011 counted 158 people in 41 households. The 2016 census measured the population of the village as 171 people in 51 households.
