= Seyqal Sara, Rezvanshahr =

Village in Gilan province, Iran

Seyqal Sara Persian: صيقل سرا
- Village
- Location within Iran
- Coordinates: 37°35′20″N 49°02′28″E
- Country: Iran
- Province: Gilan
- County: Rezvanshahr
- District: Pareh Sar
- Rural District: Dinachal

Population (2016)
  - Total: 563
- Time zone: UTC+3:30 (IRST)

Seyqal Sara (Persian: صيقل سرا) (Note: Also romanized as Şeyqal Sarā) is a village in Dinachal Rural District of Pareh Sar District in Rezvanshahr County, Gilan province, Iran.

== Demographics ==
=== Population ===
At the time of the 2006 National Census, the village's population was 2,187 in 94523households. The following census in 2011 counted 755 people in 214 households. The 2016 census measured the population of the village as 563 people in 172 households.
