= Shankavar =

Village in Gilan province, Iran

Shankavar Persian: شانكاور
- Village
- Location within Iran
- Coordinates: 37°30′39″N 49°08′40″E
- Country: Iran
- Province: Gilan
- County: Rezvanshahr
- District: Central
- Rural District: Khoshabar

Population (2016)
  - Total: 972
- Time zone: UTC+3:30 (IRST)

Shankavar (Persian: شانكاور) (Note: Also romanized as Shānkāvar; also known as Shangāvar) is a village in, and the capital of, Khoshabar Rural District in the Central District of Rezvanshahr County, Gilan province, Iran.

== Demographics ==
=== Population ===
At the time of the 2006 National Census, the village's population was 910 in 233 households. The following census in 2011 counted 957 people in 263 households. The 2016 census measured the population of the village as 972 people in 293 households.
