= Rowshandeh =

Rowshandeh or Rowshan Deh (Persian: روشنده) may refer to:

- Rowshandeh, Rezvanshahr
- Rowshan Deh, Pareh Sar, Rezvanshahr County
