= Kish Khaleh, Rezvanshahr =

Village in Gilan province, Iran

Kish Khaleh Persian: كيش خاله
- Village
- Location within Iran
- Coordinates: 37°39′23″N 49°02′42″E
- Country: Iran
- Province: Gilan
- County: Rezvanshahr
- District: Pareh Sar
- Rural District: Dinachal

Population (2016)
  - Total: 832
- Time zone: UTC+3:30 (IRST)

Kish Khaleh (Persian: كيش خاله) (Note: Also romanized as Kīsh Khāleh; also known as Kīsheh Khāleh) is a village in Dinachal Rural District of Pareh Sar District in Rezvanshahr County, Gilan province, Iran.

== Demographics ==
=== Population ===
At the time of the 2006 National Census, the village's population was 851 in 206 households. The following census in 2011 counted 843 people in 214 households. The 2016 census measured the population of the village as 832 people in 244 households.
