= Vazmi =

Vazmi وزمی
- Village
- Location within Iran
- Coordinates: 37.496°N 48.968°E
- Country: Iran
- Province: Gilan
- County: Rezvanshahr
- Bakhsh: Central
- Rural District: Khoshabar
- Elevation: 440 m (1,440 ft)

Population (2016)
  - Total: 32
- Time zone: UTC+3:30 (IRST)

Vazmi (Persian: وزمی, also Romanized as Vazmī) is a village in Khoshabar Rural District, in the Central District of Rezvanshahr County, Gilan Province, Iran.

At the time of the 2006 National Census, the village's population was 28 in 6 households. The following census in 2011 counted less than 4 households. The 2016 census measured the population of the village as 32 people in 10 households.
