= Khojeh Darreh =

Khojeh Darreh خجه دره
- Village
- Location within Iran
- Coordinates: 37°32′34″N 48°57′26″E
- Country: Iran
- Province: Gilan
- County: Rezvanshahr
- Bakhsh: Pareh Sar
- Rural District: Yeylaqi-ye Ardeh

Population (2016)
  - Total: 116
- Time zone: UTC+3:30 (IRST)

Khojeh Darreh (Persian: خجه دره) is a village in Yeylaqi-ye Ardeh Rural District, Pareh Sar District, Rezvanshahr County, Gilan Province, Iran.

At the time of the 2006 National Census, the village's population was 138 in 27 households. The following census in 2011 counted 115 people in 34 households. The 2016 census measured the population of the village as 116 people in 34 households.
