= Kohneh Keh =

Village in Gilan province, Iran

Kohneh Keh Persian: كهنه كه
- Village
- Location within Iran
- Coordinates: 37°32′28″N 48°53′30″E
- Country: Iran
- Province: Gilan
- County: Rezvanshahr
- District: Pareh Sar
- Rural District: Yeylaqi-ye Ardeh

Population (2016)
  - Total: 217
- Time zone: UTC+3:30 (IRST)

Kohneh Keh (Persian: كهنه كه) (Note: Also romanized as Kohneh Kah; also known as Konkeh) is a village in Yeylaqi-ye Ardeh Rural District of Pareh Sar District in Rezvanshahr County, Gilan province, Iran.

== Demographics ==
=== Population ===
At the time of the 2006 National Census, the village's population was 55 in 15 households. The following census in 2011 counted 57 people in 22 households. The 2016 census measured the population of the village as 217 people in 67 households.
