= Galesh Khil, Rezvanshahr =

Galesh Khil گالشخيل
- Village
- Location within Iran
- Coordinates: 37°29′44″N 49°10′54″E
- Country: Iran
- Province: Gilan
- County: Rezvanshahr
- Bakhsh: Central
- Rural District: Khoshabar

Population (2016)
  - Total: 436
- Time zone: UTC+3:30 (IRST)

Galesh Khil (Persian: گالشخيل, also Romanized as Gālesh Khīl) is a village in Khoshabar Rural District, in the Central District of Rezvanshahr County, Gilan Province, Iran.

At the time of the 2006 National Census, the village's population was 438 in 115 households. The following census in 2011 counted 421 people in 111 households. The 2016 census measured the population of the village as 436 people in 127 households.
