= Now Deh, Rezvanshahr =

Village in Gilan province, Iran

Now Deh Persian: نوده
- Village
- Location within Iran
- Coordinates: 37°32′30″N 48°54′31″E
- Country: Iran
- Province: Gilan
- County: Rezvanshahr
- District: Pareh Sar
- Rural District: Yeylaqi-ye Ardeh

Population (2016)
  - Total: 205
- Time zone: UTC+3:30 (IRST)

Now Deh (Persian: نوده) is a village in Yeylaqi-ye Ardeh Rural District of Pareh Sar District in Rezvanshahr County, Gilan province, Iran.

== Demographics ==
=== Population ===
At the time of the 2006 National Census, the village's population was 156 in 37 households. The following census in 2011 counted 135 people in 43 households. The 2016 census measured the population of the village as 205 people in 68 households.
