= Dasht Mian =

Dasht Mian دشت ميان
- Village
- Location within Iran
- Coordinates: 37°28′43″N 48°56′35″E
- Country: Iran
- Province: Gilan
- County: Rezvanshahr
- Bakhsh: Central
- Rural District: Khoshabar

Population (2016)
  - Total: 46
- Time zone: UTC+3:30 (IRST)

Dasht Mian (Persian: دشت ميان, also Romanized as Dasht Mīān) is a village in Khoshabar Rural District, in the Central District of Rezvanshahr County, Gilan Province, Iran.

At the time of the 2006 National Census, the village's population was 87 in 24 households. The following census in 2011 counted 64 people in 22 households. The 2016 census measured the population of the village as 46 people in 17 households.
