= Sandian =

Village in Gilan province, Iran

Sandian Persian: سنديان
- Village
- Location within Iran
- Coordinates: 37°34′16″N 49°07′26″E
- Country: Iran
- Province: Gilan
- County: Rezvanshahr
- District: Pareh Sar
- Rural District: Dinachal

Population (2016)
  - Total: 388
- Time zone: UTC+3:30 (IRST)

Sandian (Persian: سنديان) (Note: Also romanized as Sandīān; also known as Sandīsān Bāzār) is a village in Dinachal Rural District of Pareh Sar District in Rezvanshahr County, Gilan province, Iran.

== Demographics ==
=== Population ===
At the time of the 2006 National Census, the village's population was 519 in 142 households. The following census in 2011 counted 338 people in 100 households. The 2016 census measured the population of the village as 388 people in 134 households.
