= Tarom Sara, Rezvanshahr =

Village in Gilan province, Iran

Tarom Sara Persian: طارم سرا
- Village
- Location within Iran
- Coordinates: 37°31′48″N 49°09′01″E
- Country: Iran
- Province: Gilan
- County: Rezvanshahr
- District: Central
- Rural District: Gil Dulab

Population (2016)
  - Total: 324
- Time zone: UTC+3:30 (IRST)

Tarom Sara (Persian: طارم سرا) (Note: Also romanized as Ţārom Sarā; also known as Ţārom Sarā-ye Pā’īn) is a village in Gil Dulab Rural District of the Central District in Rezvanshahr County, Gilan province, Iran.

== Demographics ==
=== Population ===
At the time of the 2006 National Census, the village's population was 404 in 106 households. The following census in 2011 counted 366 people in 111 households. The 2016 census measured the population of the village as 324 people in 107 households.
