= Bargam =

Bargam (Persian: برگام or بارگام) may refer to:

- Bargam, Rezvanshahr (بارگام - Bārgām)
- Bargam, Rudsar (برگام - Bargām)
- Bargam language

== See also ==
- Bagram
