= Kaliman, Iran =

Kaliman كليمان
- Village
- Location within Iran
- Coordinates: 37°35′10″N 49°07′41″E
- Country: Iran
- Province: Gilan
- County: Rezvanshahr
- Bakhsh: Central
- Rural District: Gil Dulab

Population (2016)
  - Total: 176
- Time zone: UTC+3:30 (IRST)

Kaliman (Persian: كليمان, also Romanized as Kalīmān; also known as Kalemān and Kalīmān-e Bālā) is a village in Gil Dulab Rural District, in the Central District of Rezvanshahr County, Gilan Province, Iran.

At the time of the 2006 National Census, the village's population was 255 in 71 households. The following census in 2011 counted 177 people in 56 households. The 2016 census measured the population of the village as 176 people in 61 households.
