= Chakh =

Chakh چاخ
- Village
- Location within Iran
- Coordinates: 37°28′40″N 49°05′39″E
- Country: Iran
- Province: Gilan
- County: Rezvanshahr
- Bakhsh: Central
- Rural District: Khoshabar
- Elevation: 100–200 m (330–660 ft)

Population (2006)
  - Total: 231
- Time zone: UTC+3:30 (IRST)

Chakh (Persian: چاخ, also Romanized as Chākh) is a village in Khoshabar Rural District, in the Central District of Rezvanshahr County, Gilan Province, Iran.

At the time of the 2006 National Census, the village's population was 231 in 65 households. The following census in 2011 counted 252 people in 81 households. The 2016 census measured the population of the village as 215 people in 72 households.
