= Aq Masjed, Rezvanshahr =

Village in Gilan province, Iran

Aq Masjed Persian: آق مسجد
- Village
- Location within Iran
- Coordinates: 37°30′08″N 48°47′31″E
- Country: Iran
- Province: Gilan
- County: Rezvanshahr
- District: Pareh Sar
- Rural District: Yeylaqi-ye Ardeh

Population (2016)
  - Total: 419
- Time zone: UTC+3:30 (IRST)

Aq Masjed (Persian: آق مسجد) (Note: Also romanized as Āq Masjed; also known as Rīneh and Wīlru) is a village in Yeylaqi-ye Ardeh Rural District of Pareh Sar District in Rezvanshahr County, Gilan province, Iran. The primary export of the village is wool.

== Demographics ==
=== Population ===
At the time of the 2006 National Census, the village's population was 224 in 52 households. The following census in 2011 counted 355 people in 108 households. The 2016 census measured the population of the village as 419 people in 122 households.
