= Ban Monikesh =

Ban Monikesh بن مني كش
- Village
- Interactive map of Ban Monikesh
- Coordinates: 37.52°N 49.094°E
- Country: Iran
- Province: Gilan
- County: Rezvanshahr
- Bakhsh: Central
- Rural District: Khoshabar
- Elevation: 200 m (660 ft)

Population (2016)
  - Total: 114
- Time zone: UTC+3:30 (IRST)

Ban Monikesh (Persian: بن مني كش, also Romanized as Ban Monīkesh) is a village in Khoshabar Rural District, in the Central District of Rezvanshahr County, Gilan Province, Iran.

At the time of the 2006 National Census, the village's population was 124 in 29 households. The following census in 2011 counted 71 people in 20 households. The 2016 census measured the population of the village as 114 people in 36 households.
