= Hurian =

Hurian (Persian: هوریان) may refer to:

- Hurian, Gilan
- Hurian, Kermanshah

== See also ==
- Hurrian
