= Sekam =

Village in Gilan province, Iran

Sekam Persian: سكام
- Village
- Location within Iran
- Coordinates: 37°30′57″N 49°08′03″E
- Country: Iran
- Province: Gilan
- County: Rezvanshahr
- District: Central
- Rural District: Khoshabar

Population (2016)
  - Total: 554
- Time zone: UTC+3:30 (IRST)

Sekam (Persian: سكام) (Note: Also romanized as Sekām; also known as Seh Kām) is a village in Khoshabar Rural District of the Central District in Rezvanshahr County, Gilan province, Iran.

== Demographics ==
=== Population ===
At the time of the 2006 National Census, the village's population was 417 in 112 households. The following census in 2011 counted 556 people in 161 households. The 2016 census measured the population of the village as 554 people in 161 households.
