= Visadar =

Coordinates: 37°35′26.67″N 48°55′26.05″E

Visadar Waterfall
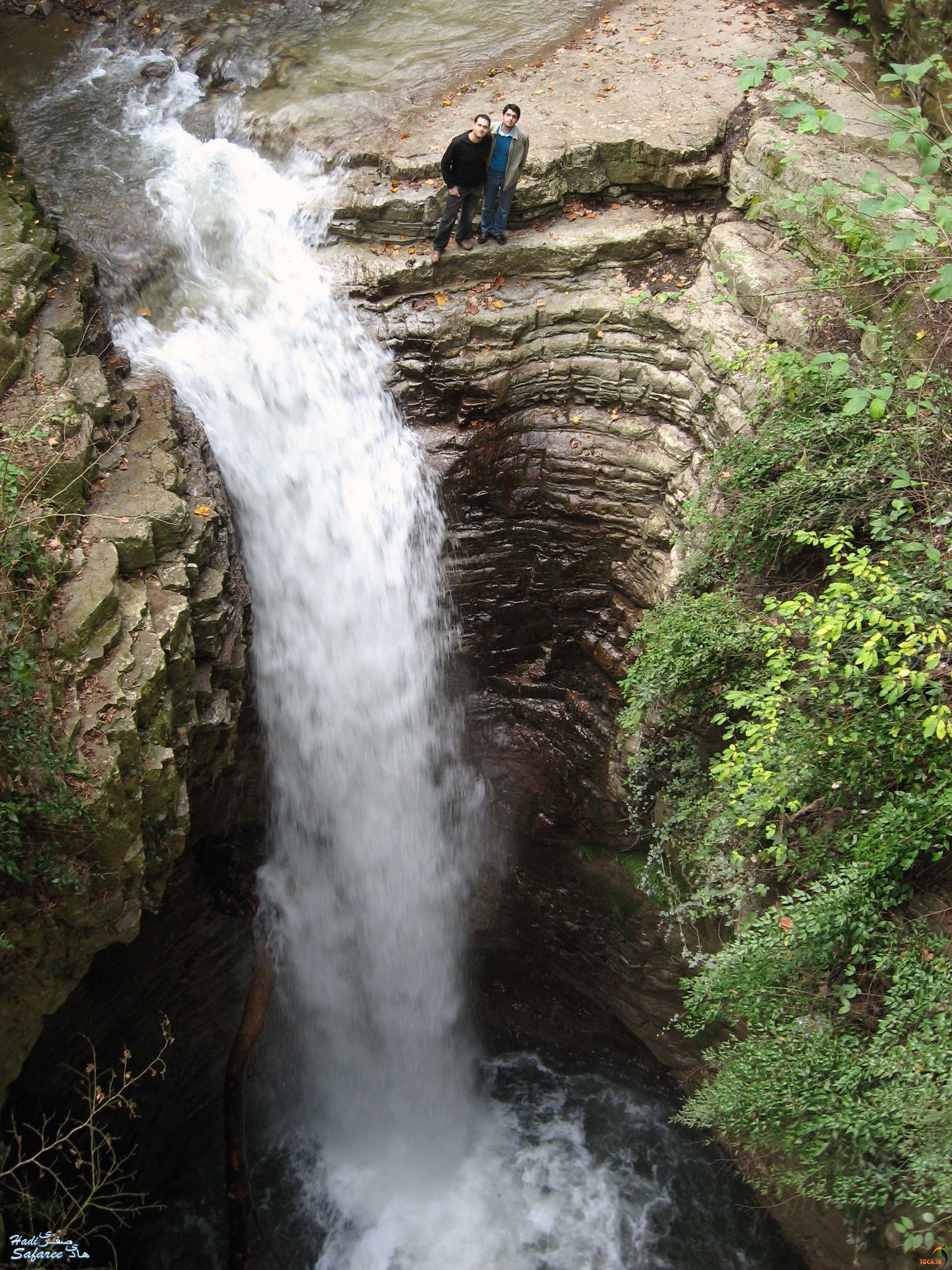
- Visadar Waterfall
- Interactive map of Visadar Waterfall
- Location: Pareh Sar District, Rezvanshahr, Iran
- Total height: 15 m (49 ft)
- Watercourse: Talysh Mountains

Visadar Waterfall (Persian: آبشار ویسادار) is a waterfall located in the Hyrcanian forests of Rezvanshahr County, within Gilan Province in northwestern Iran. It is the 3rd highest waterfall in Gilan. The name Visadar in local language means "The Shadow of the Willow Tree".

== Geography ==
The waterfall is located 16 km (9.9 mi) west of Pareh Sar city, nestled inside the lush, dense forest of the region, along the course of the Lemir River.

The waterfall has a height of 15 m (49 ft) and has a circular pond with a depth of 2 m (6.6 ft).

Near the waterfall is a settlement that includes facilities such as coffee shop, children's play equipment, and souvenir shop have been built around Visadar Waterfall. The settlement was mentioned as an Abadi with agricultural activity in Iran's census results, though with a very small population.

Visadar village Population history
Year	Pop.	±%
1966	21	—
1976	13	−38.1%
1986	4	−69.2%
2006	2	−50.0%
2016	0	−100.0%

== Gallery ==
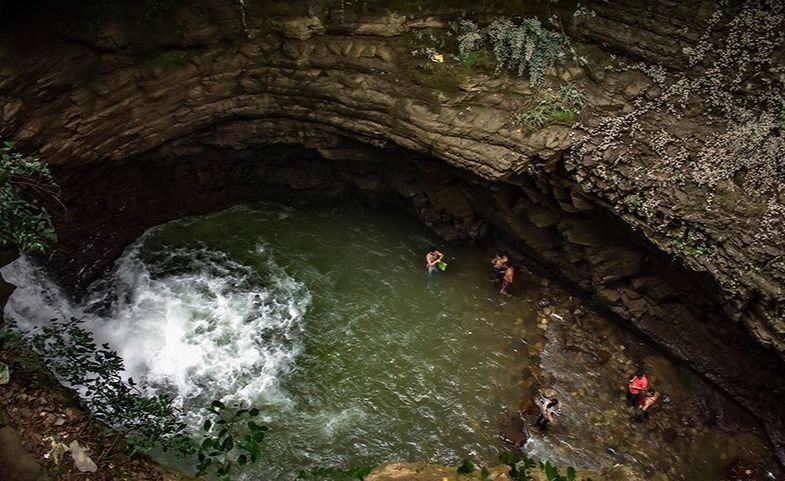
The Waterfall

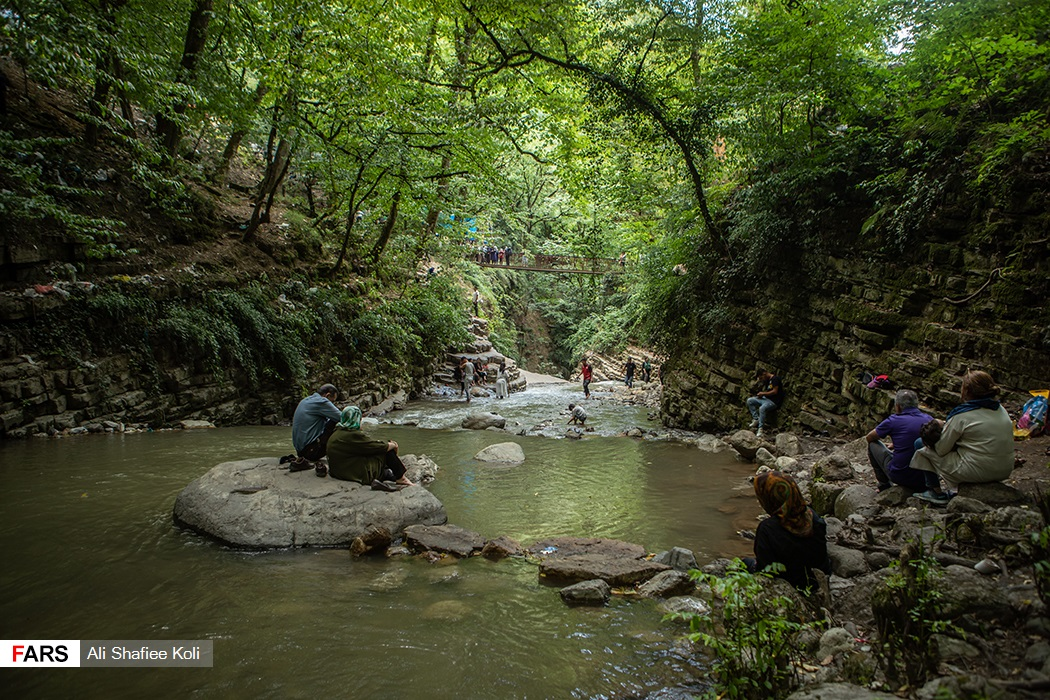
Tourists visiting Visadar

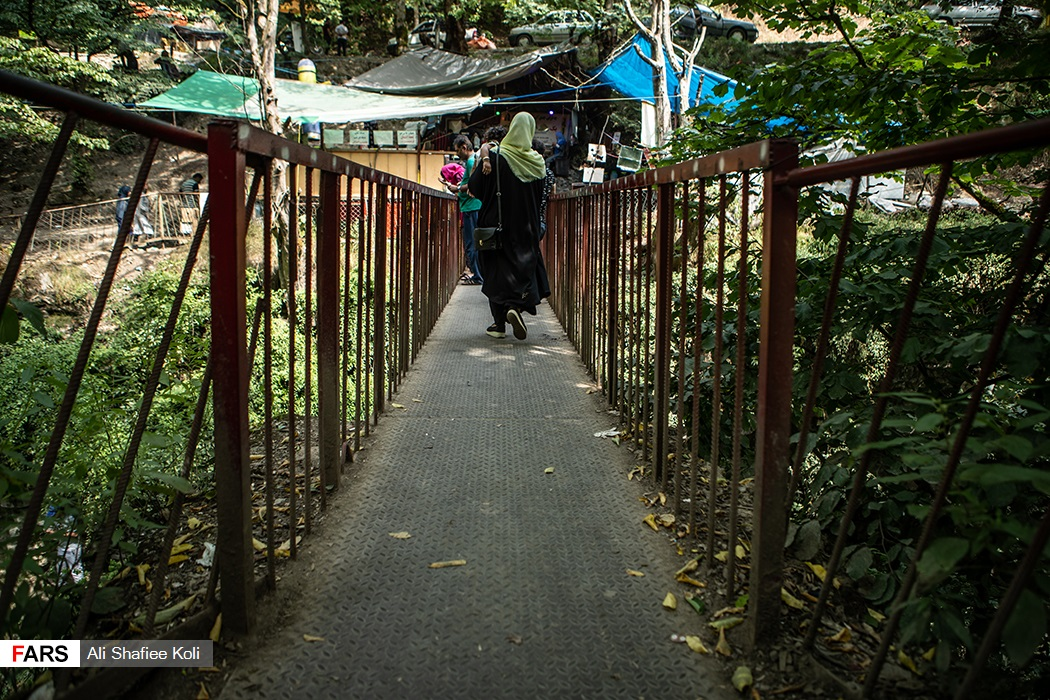
Visadar

== See also ==
- List of waterfalls
- Visadar Waterfall on commons
