= Charan, Gilan =

Village in Gilan province, Iran

Charan Persian: چران
- Village
- Location within Iran
- Coordinates: 37°36′25″N 49°02′10″E
- Country: Iran
- Province: Gilan
- County: Rezvanshahr
- District: Pareh Sar
- Rural District: Dinachal

Population (2016)
  - Total: 585
- Time zone: UTC+3:30 (IRST)

Charan (Persian: چران) (Note: Also romanized as Charān) is a village in Dinachal Rural District of Pareh Sar District in Rezvanshahr County, Gilan province, Iran.

== Demographics ==
=== Population ===
At the time of the 2006 National Census, the village's population was 577 in 136 households. The following census in 2011 counted 574 people in 162 households. The 2016 census measured the population of the village as 585 people in 191 households.
