= Gil Chalan =

Village in Gilan province, Iran

Gil Chalan Persian: گيل چالان
- Village
- Location within Iran
- Coordinates: 37°31′48″N 49°09′59″E
- Country: Iran
- Province: Gilan
- County: Rezvanshahr
- District: Central
- Rural District: Gil Dulab

Population (2016)
  - Total: 744
- Time zone: UTC+3:30 (IRST)

Gil Chalan (Persian: گيل چالان) (Note: Also romanized as Gīl Chālān; also known as Gīlchālān-e Bālā) is a village in Gil Dulab Rural District of the Central District in Rezvanshahr County, Gilan province, Iran.

== Demographics ==
=== Population ===
At the time of the 2006 National Census, the village's population was 861 in 217 households. The following census in 2011 counted 808 people in 242 households. The 2016 census measured the population of the village as 744 people in 245 households.
