= Vanegah =

Vanegah وانگاه
- Village
- Location within Iran
- Coordinates: 37°30′23″N 49°07′11″E
- Country: Iran
- Province: Gilan
- County: Rezvanshahr
- Bakhsh: Central
- Rural District: Khoshabar

Population (2016)
  - Total: 123
- Time zone: UTC+3:30 (IRST)

Vanegah (Persian: وانگاه, also Romanized as Vānegāh) is a village in Khoshabar Rural District, in the Central District of Rezvanshahr County, Gilan Province, Iran.

At the time of the 2006 National Census, the village's population was 128 in 37 households. The following census in 2011 counted 122 people in 38 households. The 2016 census measured the population of the village as 123 people in 40 households.
