= Biachal =

Biachal بياچال
- Village
- Location within Iran
- Coordinates: 37°26′21″N 48°54′16″E
- Country: Iran
- Province: Gilan
- County: Rezvanshahr
- Bakhsh: Central
- Rural District: Khoshabar
- Elevation: 900–1,000 m (3,000–3,300 ft)

Population (2016)
  - Total: 116
- Time zone: UTC+3:30 (IRST)

Biachal (Persian: بياچال, also Romanized as Bīāchāl; also known as Bīyeh Chāl) is a village in Khoshabar Rural District, in the Central District of Rezvanshahr County, Gilan Province, Iran.

At the time of the 2006 National Census, the village's population was 191 in 52 households. The following census in 2011 counted 103 people in 34 households. The 2016 census measured the population of the village as 116 people in 41 households.
