= Bareh Sara =

Village in Gilan province, Iran

Bareh Sara Persian: بره سرا
- Village
- Location within Iran
- Coordinates: 37°34′48″N 49°03′16″E
- Country: Iran
- Province: Gilan
- County: Rezvanshahr
- District: Pareh Sar
- Rural District: Dinachal

Population (2016)
  - Total: 514
- Time zone: UTC+3:30 (IRST)

Bareh Sara (Persian: بره سرا) (Note: Also romanized as Bareh Sarā; also known as Baresarā) is a village in Dinachal Rural District of Pareh Sar District in Rezvanshahr County, Gilan province, Iran.

== Demographics ==
=== Population ===
At the time of the 2006 National Census, the village's population was 361 in 94 households. The following census in 2011 counted 562 people in 155 households. The 2016 census measured the population of the village as 514 people in 161 households.
