= Sarak, Gilan =

Village in Gilan, Iran

Sarak سرک
- Village
- Interactive map of Sarak
- Coordinates: 37.515°N 49.026°E
- Country: Iran
- Province: Gilan
- County: Rezvanshahr
- Bakhsh: Central
- Rural District: Khoshabar
- Elevation: 220 m (720 ft)

Population (2016)
  - Total: 171
- Time zone: UTC+3:30 (IRST)

Sarak (Persian: سرک) is a village in Khoshabar Rural District, in the Central District of Rezvanshahr County, Gilan Province, Iran.

At the time of the 2006 National Census, the village's population was 171. The following census in 2011 counted 205 people in 64 households. The 2016 census measured the population of the village as 171 people in 57 households.
