= Latum, Iran =

Latum لتوم
- Village
- Location within Iran
- Coordinates: 37°32′28″N 48°56′30″E
- Country: Iran
- Province: Gilan
- County: Rezvanshahr
- Bakhsh: Pareh Sar
- Rural District: Yeylaqi-ye Ardeh

Population (2016)
  - Total: 99
- Time zone: UTC+3:30 (IRST)

Latum (Persian: لتوم, also Romanized as Latūm, Latoom, Letowm, and Lotūm; also known as Letom) is a village in Yeylaqi-ye Ardeh Rural District, Pareh Sar District, Rezvanshahr County, Gilan Province, Iran. At the 2016 census, its population was 99, in 30 families.
