= Visheh Sara, Rezvanshahr =

Visheh Sara ويشه سرا
- Village
- Location within Iran
- Coordinates: 37°21′09″N 49°11′06″E
- Country: Iran
- Province: Gilan
- County: Rezvanshahr
- Bakhsh: Central
- Rural District: Khoshabar

Population (2016)
  - Total: 223
- Time zone: UTC+3:30 (IRST)

Visheh Sara (Persian: ويشه سرا, also Romanized as Vīsheh Sarā) is a village in Khoshabar Rural District, in the Central District of Rezvanshahr County, Gilan Province, Iran.

At the time of the 2006 National Census, the village's population was 237 in 58 households. The following census in 2011 counted 230 people in 63 households. The 2016 census measured the population of the village as 223 people in 66 households.
