= Sangdeh =

Sangdeh or Sang Deh or Sang-i-Deh or Sangedeh (Persian: سنگده) may refer to:

- Sangdeh, Gilan
- Sangdeh, Hamadan
- Sang Deh, Mazandaran
