= Bargam, Rezvanshahr =

Village in Gilan province, Iran

Bargam Persian: پارگام، بارگام
- Village
- Location within Iran
- Coordinates: 37.507°N 48.848°E
- Country: Iran
- Province: Gilan
- County: Rezvanshahr
- District: Pareh Sar
- Rural District: Yeylaqi-ye Ardeh

Population (2016)
  - Total: 243
- Time zone: UTC+3:30 (IRST)

Bargam (Persian: بارگام) (Note: Also romanized as Bārgām; also known as Pargām, Bārgābzān and Bārgām Barm) is a village in Yeylaqi-ye Ardeh Rural District of Pareh Sar District in Rezvanshahr County, Gilan province, Iran.

== Demographics ==
=== Population ===
At the time of the 2006 National Census, the village's population was 217 in 55 households. The following census in 2011 counted 118 people in 33 households. The 2016 census measured the population of the village as 243 people in 77 households.
