= Visheh Sara =

Visheh Sara (Persian: ويشه سرا) may refer to:

- Visheh Sara, Rezvanshahr
- Visheh Sara, Sowme'eh Sara
