= Darvaz, Gilan =

Village in Gilan province, Iran

Darvaz Persian: درواز
- Village
- Location within Iran
- Coordinates: 37°29′07″N 49°08′22″E
- Country: Iran
- Province: Gilan
- County: Rezvanshahr
- District: Central
- Rural District: Khoshabar

Population (2016)
  - Total: 644
- Time zone: UTC+3:30 (IRST)

Darvaz (Persian: درواز) (Note: Also romanized as Darvāz; also known as Darvāzeh Dīlakh) is a village in Khoshabar Rural District of the Central District in Rezvanshahr County, Gilan province, Iran.

== Demographics ==
=== Population ===
At the time of the 2006 National Census, the village's population was 620 in 147 households. The following census in 2011 counted 660 people in 200 households. The 2016 census measured the population of the village as 644 people in 212 households.
