= Siah Bil, Khoshabar =

Siah Bil سياه بيل
- Village
- Location within Iran
- Coordinates: 37.497°N 48.952°E
- Country: Iran
- Province: Gilan
- County: Rezvanshahr
- Bakhsh: Central
- Rural District: Khoshabar
- Elevation: 500–700 m (1,600–2,300 ft)

Population (2016)
  - Total: 30
- Time zone: UTC+3:30 (IRST)

Siah Bil (Persian: سياه بيل, also Romanized as Sīāh Bīl and Sīāhbīl) is a village in Khoshabar Rural District, in the Central District of Rezvanshahr County, Gilan Province, Iran.

At the time of the 2006 National Census, the village's population was 26 in 7 households. The following census in 2011 also counted 26 people in 7 households. The 2016 census measured the population of the village as 30 people in eight households.
