= Siahbil, Gil Dulab =

Village in Gilan province, Iran

Siahbil Persian: سياه بيل
- Village
- Location within Iran
- Coordinates: 37°33′29″N 49°10′54″E
- Country: Iran
- Province: Gilan
- County: Rezvanshahr
- District: Central
- Rural District: Gil Dulab

Population (2016)
  - Total: 439
- Time zone: UTC+3:30 (IRST)

Siahbil (Persian: سياه بيل) (Note: Also romanized as Sīāhbīl; also known as Sīāh Nīl) is a village in Gil Dulab Rural District of the Central District in Rezvanshahr County, Gilan province, Iran.

== Demographics ==
=== Population ===
At the time of the 2006 National Census, the village's population was 433 in 114 households. The following census in 2011 counted 419 people in 116 households. The 2016 census measured the population of the village as 439 people in 135 households.
