= Siah Bil Khushaber =

Siah Bil Khushaber سياه بيل خوشابر
- Village
- Location within Iran
- Coordinates: 37°29′19″N 49°09′04″E
- Country: Iran
- Province: Gilan
- County: Rezvanshahr
- Bakhsh: Central
- Rural District: Khoshabar

Population (2016)
  - Total: 446
- Time zone: UTC+3:30 (IRST)

Siah Bil Khushaber (Persian: سياه بيل خوشابر, also Romanized as Sīāh Bīl Khūshāber; also known as Sīāh Bīl Maḩalleh and Sīāhbīl) is a village in Khoshabar Rural District, in the Central District of Rezvanshahr County, Gilan Province, Iran.

At the time of the 2006 National Census, the village's population was 444 in 120 households. The following census in 2011 counted 423 people in 98 households. The 2016 census measured the population of the village as 446 people in 126 households.
