= Malal =

Malal may refer to:

- Malal, Rezvanshahr, Iran
- Malal, a fictional god of Chaos in the Warhammer Fantasy universe
- Malaal (film), 2019 Indian romantic drama by Mangesh Hadawale
