= Latum =

Latum may refer to:

- Latum, Iran, a village in Gilan Province, Iran
- the marine parasite Diphyllobothrium latum
- Ligamentum latum, the Broad ligament of the uterus
