= Ardeh, Iran =

Village in Gilan province, Iran

Ardeh Persian: ارده
- Village
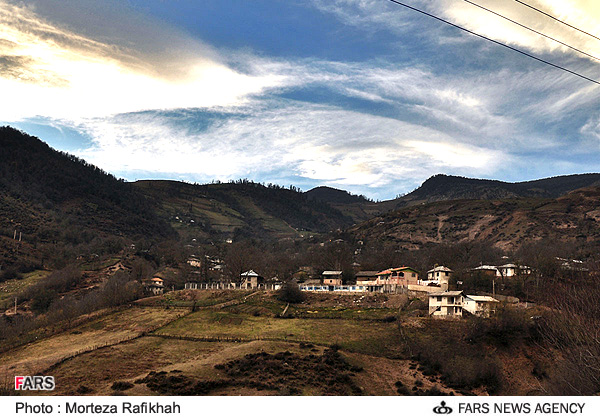
- The village of Ardeh

- Location within Iran
- Coordinates: 37°32′19″N 48°49′38″E
- Country: Iran
- Province: Gilan
- County: Rezvanshahr
- District: Pareh Sar
- Rural District: Yeylaqi-ye Ardeh

Population (2016)
  - Total: 682
- Time zone: UTC+3:30 (IRST)

Ardeh (Persian: ارده) is a village in, and the capital of, Yeylaqi-ye Ardeh Rural District in Pareh Sar District of Rezvanshahr County, Gilan province, Iran.

== Demographics ==
=== Population ===
At the time of the 2006 National Census, the village's population was 593 in 155 households. The following census in 2011 counted 472 people in 144 households. The 2016 census measured the population of the village as 682 people in 233 households. It was the most populous village in its rural district.
