= Rowshandeh, Gil Dulab =

Rowshandeh روشنده
- Village
- Location within Iran
- Coordinates: 37°32′42″N 49°08′51″E
- Country: Iran
- Province: Gilan
- County: Rezvanshahr
- Bakhsh: Central
- Rural District: Gil Dulab

Population (2016)
  - Total: 197
- Time zone: UTC+3:30 (IRST)

Rowshandeh (Persian: روشنده) is a village in Gil Dulab Rural District, in the Central District of Rezvanshahr County, Gilan Province, Iran.

At the time of the 2006 National Census, the village's population was 178 in 45 households. The following census in 2011 counted 184 people in 56 households. The 2016 census measured the population of the village as 197 people in 62 households.
