= Shirva =

Shirva may refer to:

- Shirva, India
- Shirva, Iran
