= Ardeh =

Ardeh may refer to:

- Ardeh, Iran
- Ardeh, Lebanon
