= Khalkhalian, Rezvanshahr =

Village in Gilan province, Iran

Khalkhalian Persian: خلخاليان
- Village
- Location within Iran
- Coordinates: 37°36′29″N 49°04′55″E
- Country: Iran
- Province: Gilan
- County: Rezvanshahr
- District: Pareh Sar
- Rural District: Dinachal

Population (2016)
  - Total: 713
- Time zone: UTC+3:30 (IRST)

Khalkhalian (Persian: خلخاليان) (Note: Also romanized as Khalkhālīān) is a village in Dinachal Rural District of Pareh Sar District in Rezvanshahr County, Gilan province, Iran.

== Demographics ==
=== Population ===
At the time of the 2006 National Census, the village's population was 648 in 174 households. The following census in 2011 counted 957 people in 272 households. The 2016 census measured the population of the village as 713 people in 230 households.
