= Malal, Rezvanshahr =

Malal ملال
- Village
- Location within Iran
- Coordinates: 37°27′56″N 48°56′48″E
- Country: Iran
- Province: Gilan
- County: Rezvanshahr
- Bakhsh: Central
- Rural District: Khoshabar
- Elevation: 700 m (2,300 ft)

Population (2016)
  - Total: 22
- Time zone: UTC+3:30 (IRST)

Malal (Persian: ملال, also Romanized as Malāl) is a village in Khoshabar Rural District, in the Central District of Rezvanshahr County, Gilan Province, Iran.

At the time of the 2006 National Census, the village's population was 33 in 7 households. The following census in 2011 counted 20 people in eight households. The 2016 census measured the population of the village as 22 people in nine households.
