= Bijarkan =

Bijarkan or Bijar Kan (Persian: بيجاركن) may refer to:

- Bijarkan, Rezvanshahr
- Bijarkan, Sowme'eh Sara
