= Shirva, Iran =

Shirva شيروا
- Village
- Location within Iran
- Coordinates: 37°28′41″N 48°56′47″E
- Country: Iran
- Province: Gilan
- County: Rezvanshahr
- Bakhsh: Central
- Rural District: Khoshabar
- Elevation: 250–350 m (820–1,150 ft)

Population (2016)
  - Total: 35
- Time zone: UTC+3:30 (IRST)

Shirva (Persian: شيروا, also Romanized as Shīrvā) is a village in Khoshabar Rural District, in the Central District of Rezvanshahr County, Gilan Province, Iran.

At the time of the 2006 National Census, the village's population was 31 in 9 households. The following census in 2011 counted 23 people in 9 households. The 2016 census measured the population of the village as 35 people in 11 households.
