= Darvaz =

Darvaz (Tajik: Дарвоз / Persian: درواز, /dærwɒːz/), alternatively spelt Darwaz and Darvoz, may refer to the following:

- Darvaz (region), a historic region in what is now Tajikistan and Afghanistan
- Darvaz Range, Tajikistan
- Darvoz district, in Tajikistan
- Darwaz district, in Afghanistan
- Nusay district, in Afghanistan
- Darvaz, Gilan, a village in Gilan Province, Iran

== See also ==
- Derweze (Darvaza), a village in Turkmenistan
