= Allah Bakhsh Mahalleh =

Village in Gilan province, Iran

Allah Bakhsh Mahalleh Persian: اله بخش محله
- Village
- Location within Iran
- Coordinates: 37°34′25″N 49°09′01″E
- Country: Iran
- Province: Gilan
- County: Rezvanshahr
- District: Central
- Rural District: Gil Dulab

Population (2016)
  - Total: 523
- Time zone: UTC+3:30 (IRST)

Allah Bakhsh Mahalleh (Persian: اله بخش محله) (Note: Also romanized as Allāh Bakhsh Maḩalleh; also known as Allāh Bakhsh) is a village in Gil Dulab Rural District of the Central District in Rezvanshahr County, Gilan province, Iran.

== Demographics ==
=== Population ===
At the time of the 2006 National Census, the village's population was 588 in 146 households. The following census in 2011 counted 613 people in 169 households. The 2016 census measured the population of the village as 523 people in 169 households.
