= Hurian, Gilan =

Village in Gilan province, Iran

Hurian Persian: حوريان
- Village
- Location within Iran
- Coordinates: 37°37′47″N 49°02′56″E
- Country: Iran
- Province: Gilan
- County: Rezvanshahr
- District: Pareh Sar
- Rural District: Dinachal

Population (2016)
  - Total: 1,537
- Time zone: UTC+3:30 (IRST)

Hurian (Persian: حوريان) (Note: Also romanized as Ḩūrīān) is a village in Dinachal Rural District of Pareh Sar District in Rezvanshahr County, Gilan province, Iran.

== Demographics ==
=== Population ===
At the time of the 2006 National Census, the village's population was 1,703 in 410 households. The following census in 2011 counted 1,554 people in 449 households. The 2016 census measured the population of the village as 1,537 people in 509 households.
