= Rowshan Deh, Pareh Sar =

Village in Gilan province, Iran

Rowshan Deh Persian: روشنده
- Village
- Location within Iran
- Coordinates: 37°31′07″N 48°52′36″E
- Country: Iran
- Province: Gilan
- County: Rezvanshahr
- District: Pareh Sar
- Rural District: Yeylaqi-ye Ardeh

Population (2016)
  - Total: 298
- Time zone: UTC+3:30 (IRST)

Rowshan Deh (Persian: روشنده) is a village in Yeylaqi-ye Ardeh Rural District of Pareh Sar District in Rezvanshahr County, Gilan province, Iran.

== Demographics ==
=== Population ===
At the time of the 2006 National Census, the village's population was 310 in 79 households. The following census in 2011 counted 329 people in 105 households. The 2016 census measured the population of the village as 298 people in 87 households.
