= Allah Bakhsh =

Allah Bakhsh may refer to:

- Allah Bakhsh Mahalleh, a village in Gil Dulab Rural District, Rezvanshahr County, Gilan Province, Iran
- Allah Bakhsh (painter) (1895–1978), Pakistani painter and calligrapher
