= Bijarkan, Rezvanshahr =

Bijarkan بيجاركن
- Village
- Location within Iran
- Coordinates: 37°32′03″N 49°08′05″E
- Country: Iran
- Province: Gilan
- County: Rezvanshahr
- Bakhsh: Central
- Rural District: Khoshabar

Population (2016)
  - Total: 185
- Time zone: UTC+3:30 (IRST)

Bijarkan (Persian: بيجاركن, also Romanized as Bījārkan) is a village in Khoshabar Rural District, in the Central District of Rezvanshahr County, Gilan Province, Iran.

At the time of the 2006 National Census, the village's population was 184 in 44 households. The following census in 2011 counted 195 people in 51 households. The 2016 census measured the population of the village as 188 people in 56 households.
