= Sangdeh, Gilan =

Village in Gilan province, Iran

Sangdeh Persian: سنگده
- Village
- Location within Iran
- Coordinates: 37°31′45″N 48°44′30″E
- Country: Iran
- Province: Gilan
- County: Rezvanshahr
- District: Pareh Sar
- Rural District: Yeylaqi-ye Ardeh

Population (2016)
  - Total: 343
- Time zone: UTC+3:30 (IRST)

Sangdeh (Persian: سنگده) (Note: Also romanized as Sangedeh; also known as Sangada) is a village in Yeylaqi-ye Ardeh Rural District of Pareh Sar District in Rezvanshahr County, Gilan province, Iran.

== Demographics ==
=== Population ===
At the time of the 2006 National Census, the village's population was 143 in 39 households. The following census in 2011 counted 215 people in 86 households. The 2016 census measured the population of the village as 343 people in 111 households.
