= Gil Dulab Rural District =

Rural district in Gilan province, Iran

Gil Dulab Rural District Persian: دهستان گيل دولاب
- Rural District
- Location within Iran
- Coordinates: 37°33′N 49°10′E
- Country: Iran
- Province: Gilan
- County: Rezvanshahr
- District: Central
- Established: 1987
- Capital: Dar Sara

Population (2016)
  - Total: 7,627
- Time zone: UTC+3:30 (IRST)

Gil Dulab Rural District (Persian: دهستان گيل دولاب) is in the Central District of Rezvanshahr County, Gilan province, Iran. Its capital is the village of Dar Sara.

== Demographics ==
=== Population ===
At the time of the 2006 National Census, the rural district's population was 8,451 in 2,221 households. There were 7,850 inhabitants in 2,289 households at the following census of 2011. The 2016 census measured the population of the rural district as 7,627 in 2,509 households. The most populous of its 20 villages was Dilaj Mahalleh, with 1,057 people.

=== Other villages in the rural district ===
- Allah Bakhsh Mahalleh
- Bala Mahalleh-ye Siah Belash
- Bolagh Mahalleh
- Changarian
- Gil Chalan
- Kaliman
- Khalil Mahalleh
- Kheymeh Sar
- Lakta Sara
- Mian Rud
- Rowshandeh
- Rud Sar
- Sasan Sara
- Shadkuh
- Shafa Rud
- Siahbil
- Tarom Sara
- Tazehabad
