= Dinachal Rural District =

Rural district in Gilan province, Iran

Dinachal Rural District Persian: دهستان ديناچال
- Rural District
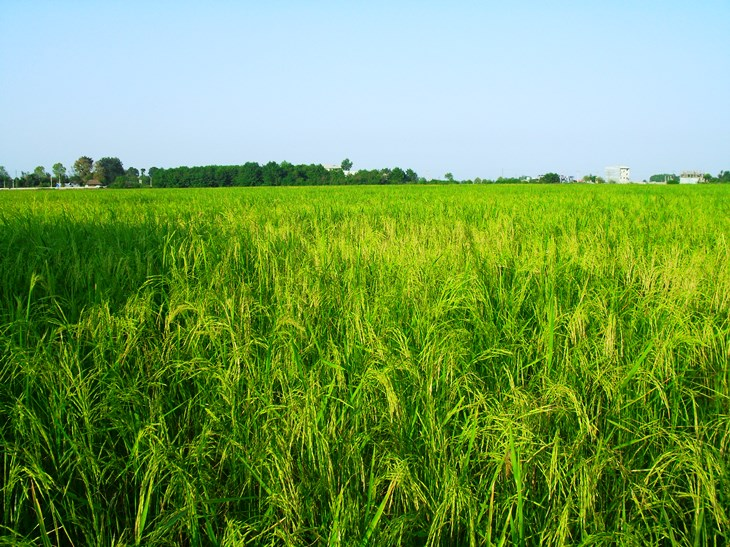
- Rice Cultivation in Pareh Sar

- Location within Iran
- Coordinates: 37°36′N 49°02′E
- Country: Iran
- Province: Gilan
- County: Rezvanshahr
- District: Pareh Sar
- Established: 1987
- Capital: Dinachal

Population (2016)
  - Total: 16,697
- Time zone: UTC+3:30 (IRST)

Dinachal Rural District (Persian: دهستان ديناچال) is in Pareh Sar District of Rezvanshahr County, Gilan province, Iran. Its capital is the village of Dinachal.

== Demographics ==
=== Population ===
At the time of the 2006 National Census, the rural district's population was 19,640 in 4,953 households. There were 19,804 inhabitants in 5,570 households at the following census of 2011. The 2016 census measured the population of the rural district as 16,697 in 5,290 households. The most populous of its 24 villages was Ardajan, with 2,408 people.

=== Other villages in the rural district ===
- Abuyar
- Alkam
- Bareh Sara
- Charan
- Hurian
- Janbeh Sara
- Kalab
- Khalkhalian
- Kish Khaleh
- Kuhestan
- Mazuposht
- Now Kandeh
- Pilembera
- Rud Kenar
- Sandian
- Sangdeh-ye Bala
- Sangdeh-ye Pain
- Seyqal Sara
- Simbari Khaleh
