= Murian =

Murian موريان
- Village
- Location within Iran
- Coordinates: 34°17′01″N 47°11′18″E
- Country: Iran
- Province: Kermanshah
- County: Kermanshah
- Bakhsh: Central
- Rural District: Dorudfaraman

Population (2006)
  - Total: 297
- Time zone: UTC+3:30 (IRST)
  - Summer (DST): UTC+4:30 (IRDT)

Murian (Persian: موريان, also Romanized as Mūrīān, Mūrīyān, and Mūreyān; also known as Mūrīān-e Şaleḩābād, Hūrīān, and Şāleḩābād) is a village in Dorudfaraman Rural District, in the Central District of Kermanshah County, Kermanshah Province, Iran. At the 2006 census, its population was 297, in 55 families.
