= Khoshabar Rural District =

Rural district in Gilan province, Iran

Khoshabar Rural District Persian: دهستان خوشابر
- Rural District
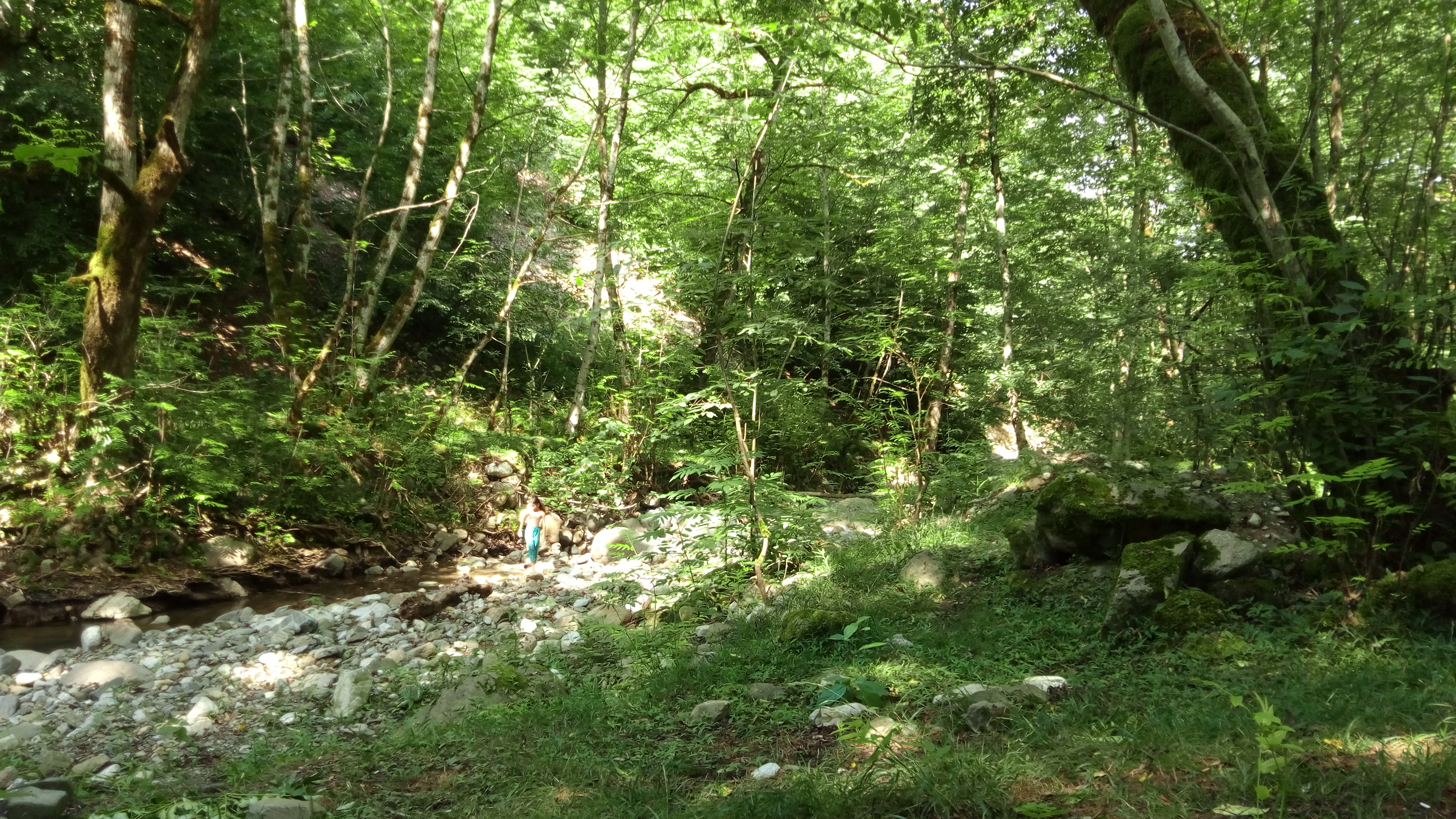
- Chaf Rud River

- Location within Iran
- Coordinates: 37°29′N 49°02′E
- Country: Iran
- Province: Gilan
- County: Rezvanshahr
- District: Central
- Established: 1987
- Capital: Shankavar

Population (2016)
  - Total: 14,468
- Time zone: UTC+3:30 (IRST)

Khoshabar Rural District (Persian: دهستان خوشابر) is in the Central District of Rezvanshahr County, Gilan province, Iran. Its capital is the village of Shankavar.

== Demographics ==
=== Population ===
At the time of the 2006 National Census, the rural district's population was 13,354 in 3,351 households. There were 13,983 inhabitants in 3,998 households at the following census of 2011. The 2016 census measured the population of the rural district as 14,468 in 4,564 households. The most populous of its 40 villages was Punel, with 2,892 people.

=== Other villages in the rural district ===
- Ahangar Mahalleh
- Alan
- Angulesh
- Aqajan Mahalleh
- Asteh Sar
- Ban Monikesh
- Banasar
- Banegah
- Baskeh Masham
- Biachal
- Bijarkan
- Chakh
- Chekcheh Posht
- Darvaz
- Dasht Mian
- Galesh Khil
- Khalasht
- Kheyl Gavan
- Malal
- Owrma
- Palang Pareh
- Palkhtar
- Razdar
- Rinch Mahalleh
- Rudbar Sara
- Sarak
- Sekam
- Sheykh Mahalleh
- Shirbacheh Pir
- Shirva
- Shishar
- Siah Bil Khushaber
- Siah Bil
- Vanegah
- Vazesht
- Vazmi
- Visheh Sara
