= Khalkhalian, Talesh =

Khalkhalian خلخاليان
- Village
- Country: Iran
- Province: Gilan
- County: Talesh
- Bakhsh: Haviq
- Rural District: Chubar

Population (2006)
  - Total: 260
- Time zone: UTC+3:30 (IRST)
  - Summer (DST): UTC+4:30 (IRDT)

Khalkhalian (Persian: خلخاليان, also Romanized as Khalkhālīān) is a village in Chubar Rural District, Haviq District, Talesh County, Gilan Province, Iran. At the 2006 census, its population was 260, in 64 families.

== Language ==
Linguistic composition of the village.

Khalkhalian linguistic composition
language	percent
Azerbaijani	100%
