= Bargam, Rudsar =

Bargam برگام
- Village
- Location within Iran
- Coordinates: 36°46′02″N 50°14′44″E
- Country: Iran
- Province: Gilan
- County: Rudsar
- Bakhsh: Rahimabad
- Rural District: Shuil

Population (2006)
  - Total: 27
- Time zone: UTC+3:30 (IRST)
  - Summer (DST): UTC+4:30 (IRDT)

Bargam (Persian: برگام, also Romanized as Bargām) is a village in Shuil Rural District, Rahimabad District, Rudsar County, Gilan Province, Iran. At the 2006 census, its population was 27, in 9 families.
