= Pareh Sar =

City in Gilan province, Iran

Pareh Sar Persian: پره سر
- City
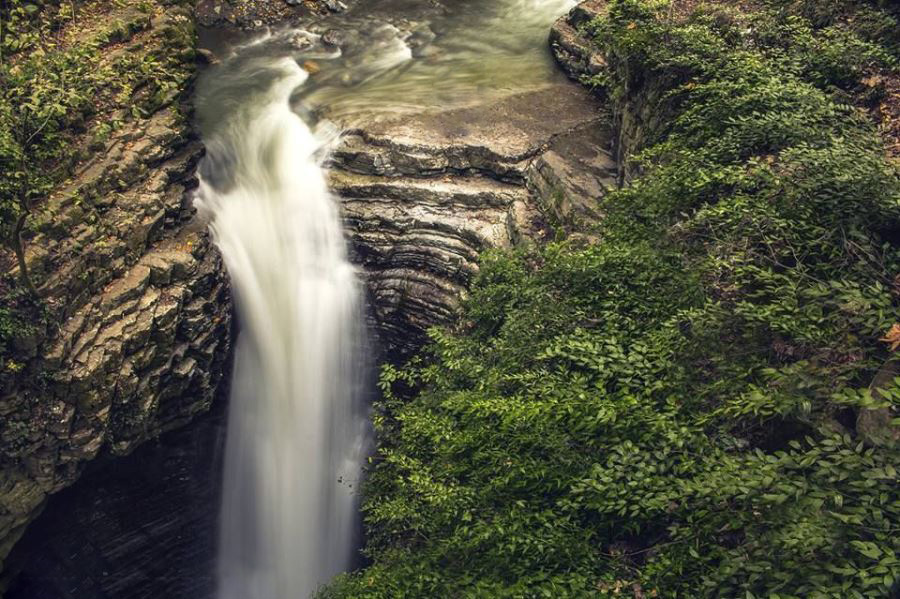

- Location within Iran
- Coordinates: 37°36′13″N 49°03′55″E
- Country: Iran
- Province: Gilan
- County: Rezvanshahr
- District: Pareh Sar

Population (2016)
  - Total: 8,016
- Time zone: UTC+3:30 (IRST)

Pareh Sar (Persian: پره سر) (Note: Also known as Bāzār Pareh Sar) is a city in, and the capital of, Pareh Sar District of Rezvanshahr County, Gilan province, Iran.

== Demographics ==
=== Population ===
At the time of the 2006 National Census, the city's population was 7,875 in 2,027 households. The following census in 2011 counted 7,626 people in 2,188 households. The 2016 census measured the population of the city as 8,016 people in 2,536 households.
