= Rezvanshahr, Gilan =

City in Gilan province, Iran

Rezvanshahr Persian: رضوانشهر
- City
- Location within Iran
- Coordinates: 37°32′53″N 49°08′08″E
- Country: Iran
- Province: Gilan
- County: Rezvanshahr
- District: Central

Population (2016)
  - Total: 19,519
- Time zone: UTC+3:30 (IRST)

Rezvanshahr (Persian: رضوانشهر) (Note: Also romanized as Reẕvānshahr and Rezvānshahr; formerly Rezvandeh (رضوانده)) is a city in the Central District of Rezvanshahr County, Gilan province, Iran, serving as capital of both the county and the district.

== History ==
In 1937, the Anzali to Astara road was completed and included Rezvanshahr on its path. This brought a lot of travellers and tourists to the city.

The Iranian disability activist and artist Mitra Farazandeh was born in this town.

== Demographics ==
=== Population ===
At the time of the 2006 National Census, the city's population was 12,355 in 3,330 households. The following census in 2011 counted 15,267 people in 4,592 households. The 2016 census measured the population of the city as 19,519 people in 6,212 households.

== See also ==
Media related to Rezvanshahr, Gilan at Wikimedia Commons
