= Pareh Sar District =

District in Gilan province, Iran

Pareh Sar District Persian: بخش پره‌سر
- District
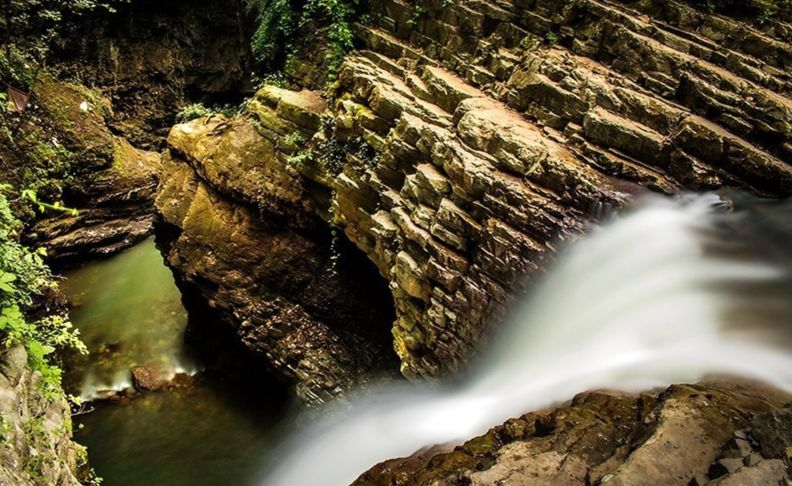
- Visadar Waterfall

- Location within Iran
- Coordinates: 37°32′N 48°55′E
- Country: Iran
- Province: Gilan
- County: Rezvanshahr
- Established: 1997
- Capital: Pareh Sar

Population (2016)
  - Total: 28,251
- Time zone: UTC+3:30 (IRST)

Pareh Sar District (Persian: بخش پره‌سر) is in Rezvanshahr County, Gilan province, Iran. Its capital is the city of Pareh Sar.

== Demographics ==
=== Population ===
At the time of the 2006 National Census, the district's population wasAt the 2006 National Census, its population was 30,033 in 7,616 households. The following census in 2011 counted 29,809 people in 8,538 households. The 2016 census measured the population of the district as 28,251 inhabitants in 8,961 households.

=== Administrative divisions ===
Pareh Sar District Population
Administrative Divisions	2006	2011	2016
Dinachal RD	19,640	19,804	16,697
Yeylaqi-ye Ardeh RD	2,518	2,379	3,538
Pareh Sar (city)	7,875	7,626	8,016
Total	30,033	29,809	28,251
RD = Rural District
