= Central District (Rezvanshahr County) =

District in Gilan province, Iran

Central District (Rezvanshahr County) Persian: بخش مرکزی شهرستان رضوانشهر
- District
- Location within Iran
- Coordinates: 37°31′N 49°02′E
- Country: Iran
- Province: Gilan
- County: Rezvanshahr
- Established: 1997
- Capital: Rezvanshahr

Population (2016)
  - Total: 41,614
- Time zone: UTC+3:30 (IRST)

The Central District of Rezvanshahr County (Persian: بخش مرکزی شهرستان رضوانشهر) is in Gilan province, Iran. Its capital is the city of Rezvanshahr.

== Demographics ==
=== Population ===
At the time of the 2006 National Census, the district's population was 34,160 in 8,902 households. The following census in 2011 counted 37,100 people in 10,879 households. The 2016 census measured the population of the district as 41,614 inhabitants in 13,285 households.

=== Administrative divisions ===
Central District (Rezvanshahr County) Population
Administrative Divisions	2006	2011	2016
Gil Dulab RD	8,451	7,850	7,627
Khoshabar RD	13,354	13,983	14,468
Rezvanshahr (city)	12,355	15,267	19,519
Total	34,160	37,100	41,614
RD = Rural District
