= Rezvanshahr County =

County in Gilan province, Iran

Rezvanshahr County Persian: شهرستان رضوانشهر
- County
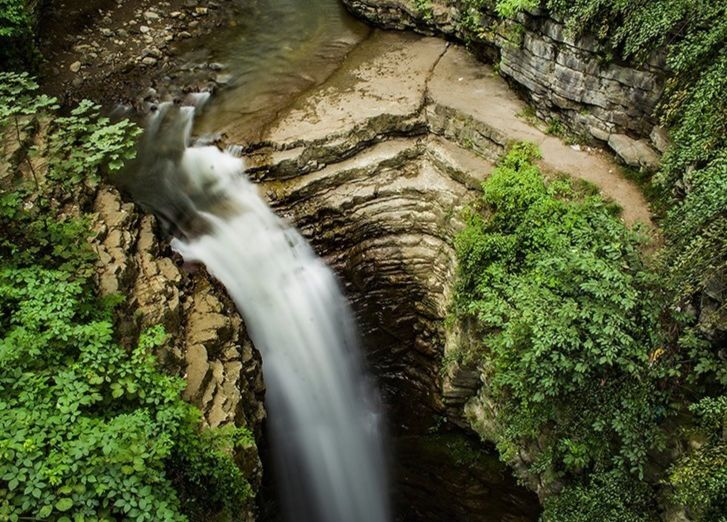
- Visadar Waterfall

- Location of Rezvanshahr County in Gilan province (left, pink)

- Location of Gilan province in Iran
- Coordinates: 37°32′N 48°57′E
- Country: Iran
- Province: Gilan
- Established: 1997
- Capital: Rezvanshahr
- Districts: Central, Pareh Sar

Population (2016)
  - Total: 69,865
- Time zone: UTC+3:30 (IRST)

Rezvanshahr County (Persian: شهرستان رضوانشهر) is in Gilan province, Iran. Its capital is the city of Rezvanshahr.

== Demographics ==
=== Population ===
At the time of the 2006 National Census, the county's population was 64,193 in 16,518 households. The following census in 2011 counted 66,909 people in 19,398 households. The 2016 census measured the population of the county as 69,865 in 22,246 households.

=== Administrative divisions ===
Rezvanshahr County's population history and administrative structure over three consecutive censuses are shown in the following table.

Rezvanshahr County Population
Administrative Divisions	2006	2011	2016
Central District	34,160	37,100	41,614
Gil Dulab RD	8,451	7,850	7,627
Khoshabar RD	13,354	13,983	14,468
Rezvanshahr (city)	12,355	15,267	19,519
Pareh Sar District	30,033	29,809	28,251
Dinachal RD	19,640	19,804	16,697
Yeylaqi-ye Ardeh RD	2,518	2,379	3,538
Pareh Sar (city)	7,875	7,626	8,016
Total	64,193	66,909	69,865
RD = Rural District

== Gallery ==
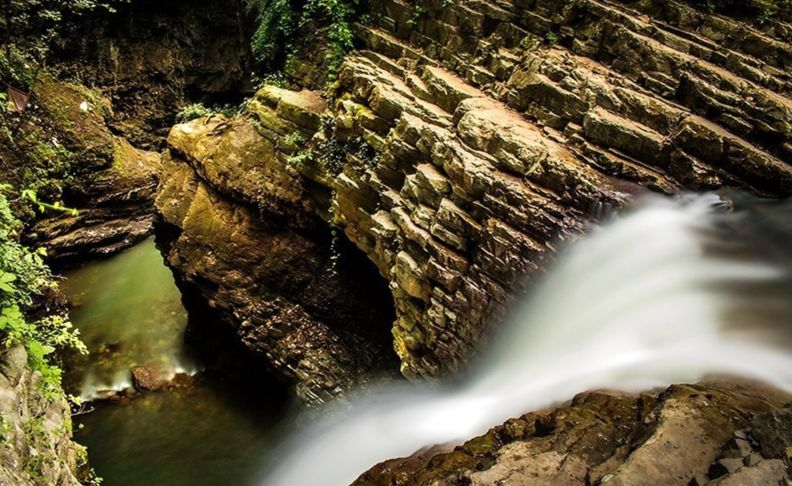

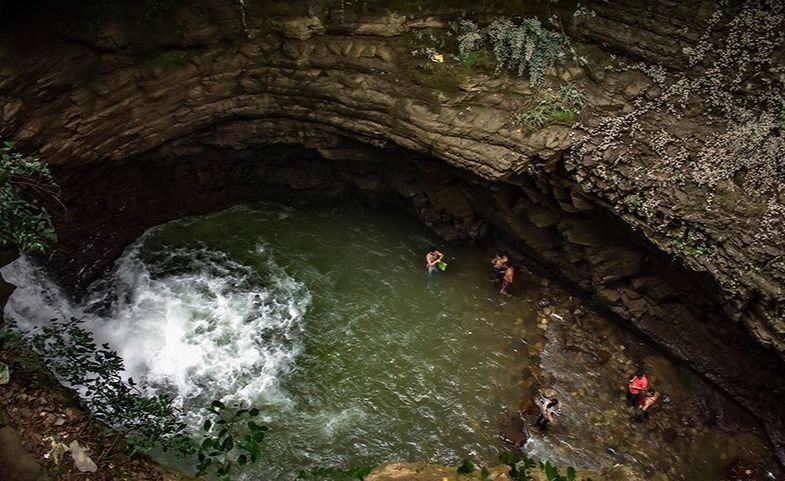

== See also ==
Media related to Rezvanshahr County at Wikimedia Commons
