= March 23 Movement =

Rebel group in the Democratic Republic of the Congo

- Mouvement du 23 Mars
- Logos used by the March 23 Movement
- Leaders: Bertrand Bisimwa (president); Sultani Makenga (military chief); Jean-Marie Runiga Lugerero (former president)
- Spokesperson: Lawrence Kanyuka
- Dates active: 6 May 2012 – present
- Allegiance: Rwanda
- Headquarters: Goma
- Active regions: Democratic Republic of the Congo, primarily North Kivu
- Ideology: Pro-Tutsi; Pro-Rwanda
- Status: Active
- Size: 8,000
- Annual revenue: Illegal mining of eastern DRC mines Rwanda
- Part of: Congo River Alliance; Front for the Refoundation of the Nation
- Wars: Kivu Conflict; M23 campaign

The March 23 Movement (French: Mouvement du 23 mars), often abbreviated as M23 and also known as the Congolese Revolutionary Army (Armée révolutionnaire du Congo), is a Rwandan-backed Congolese rebel paramilitary group. Based in the eastern regions of the Democratic Republic of the Congo, it operates mainly in the provinces of North and South Kivu, which border Uganda and Rwanda. M23 is the principal member of the Congo River Alliance, a coalition of rebel groups in eastern DRC. M23 joined the newly formed Front for the Refoundation of the Nation in October 2026.

M23 was established in 2012 by former members of the National Congress for the Defence of the People (CNDP), a Rwandan-backed rebel group largely composed of Rwandan-Congolese fighters. These combatants had previously integrated into the Armed Forces of the Democratic Republic of the Congo (FARDC) under the terms of a 2009 peace agreement, which also called for the transformation of the CNDP into a political party, reintegration of refugees, and incorporation of CNDP personnel into government roles. Local opposition to the CNDP's leadership, accused of past human rights violations, impeded the full implementation of the agreement. On 6 May 2012, a group of these ex-CNDP fighters mutinied, forming M23 and citing the government's failure to uphold the peace accord. The group launched strikes during its first rebellion against the Congolese government that led to the displacement of large numbers of people. On 20 November 2012, M23 took control of Goma, the capital of North Kivu with a population of a million people, but was persuaded to withdraw from the city by the International Conference on the Great Lakes Region (ICGLR) because the Congolese government had finally agreed to negotiate with the rebel group. In late 2012, Congolese troops, along with UN peacekeeping troops, retook Goma, and the M23 announced a ceasefire and said that it wanted to resume peace talks.

A United Nations report found that Rwanda created and commanded the M23 rebel group during the 2012 operations (in 2024, when M23 resurfaced again, another UN report found direct support from the Rwandan military). Rwanda ceased its support due to international pressure and the military defeat by the Congolese military and the UN peacekeeping forces in 2013.

In 2017, M23 remnants resumed their insurgency in the Congo, although it was largely a low-level insurgency. The M23 reorganized in 2022 and launched an offensive, which eventually resulted in the capture of the Congolese border town of Bunagana by the rebels. In November 2022, M23 rebels got close to the city of Goma and forced about 180,000 people to leave their homes after the Congolese Army had withdrawn from the region near the village of Kibumba. In June 2023, Human Rights Watch reported human rights abuses by M23 rebels in the Congo, including unlawful killings, rape and other war crimes. Allegations implicate Rwandan support for these actions, bringing concerns about war crimes and making the humanitarian situation worse in the region. The United Nations Security Council encouraged sanctions against the M23 leaders and implicated Rwandan officials. As of July 2025, the group occupies various major towns in eastern North Kivu and South Kivu including Bunagana, Kiwanja, Kitchanga, Rubaya, Rutshuru, and the cities of Goma and Bukavu.

== Background ==
North Kivu Province, DRC

Since its formation, the Congrès national pour la défense du peuple (CNDP) has been widely recognized as having received substantial support from the Rwandan government. Initial backing dates to 2003, when Laurent Nkunda, a former Tutsi rebel affiliated with the Rwandan Patriotic Front (RPF), was reportedly pressured by Rwandan authorities not to integrate into the Congolese national army following his establishment of the political movement Synergie pour la paix et la concorde. Prior to that, Nkunda had served as brigade commander for the Rassemblement Congolais pour la Démocratie–Goma (RCD-Goma) in Kisangani during 2002, when the group was implicated in the May 2002 massacre of over 160 civilians.

By 2005, the Forces armées de la République démocratique du Congo (FARDC) was undergoing brassage, a national military integration program designed to unify former rebel groups into a restructured national army. This program mandated a 45-day training period and redeployment to regions outside prior areas of operation, while also offering the option of demobilization. Many ex-RCD-Goma combatants, reluctant to serve outside the Kivu provinces, defected to Nkunda's emerging armed faction.

By the end of 2005, a significant number of soldiers from the 82nd Brigade had joined Nkunda, along with elements from the 81st and 83rd Brigades. The Bwiza military camp became a strategic center for the training of senior officers aligned with Nkunda, including former brassage defectors. Training programs such as the Senior Officer Leadership Course (SOLEC) and the Officer Management Course were established, with the latter reportedly supported by materials provided by the Rwandan government.

In early 2006, Nkunda expanded his military and political base by incorporating General Bosco Ntaganda, the former chief of staff of the Union des Patriotes Congolais (UPC), who was soon appointed Chief of Staff of the CNDP. Nkunda subsequently merged his political platform, Synergie pour la paix et la concorde, with his military faction, the Conseil militaire pour la défense du peuple (CMDP). On 26 July 2006, the CNDP was officially formed, with Nkunda assuming the dual role of Chairman and Supreme Commander. Among the CNDP's principal financiers was Tribert Rujugiro Ayabatwa, a Rwandan presidential advisor and founder of the Rwandan Investment Group. In addition to providing funding, Rujugiro maintained substantial landholdings in CNDP-controlled territories, including cattle ranches in Kilolirwe, where Nkunda established his military base. The CNDP leveraged these commercial assets to sustain its military operations and regional influence.

=== Escalation of support and regional strategic interests ===
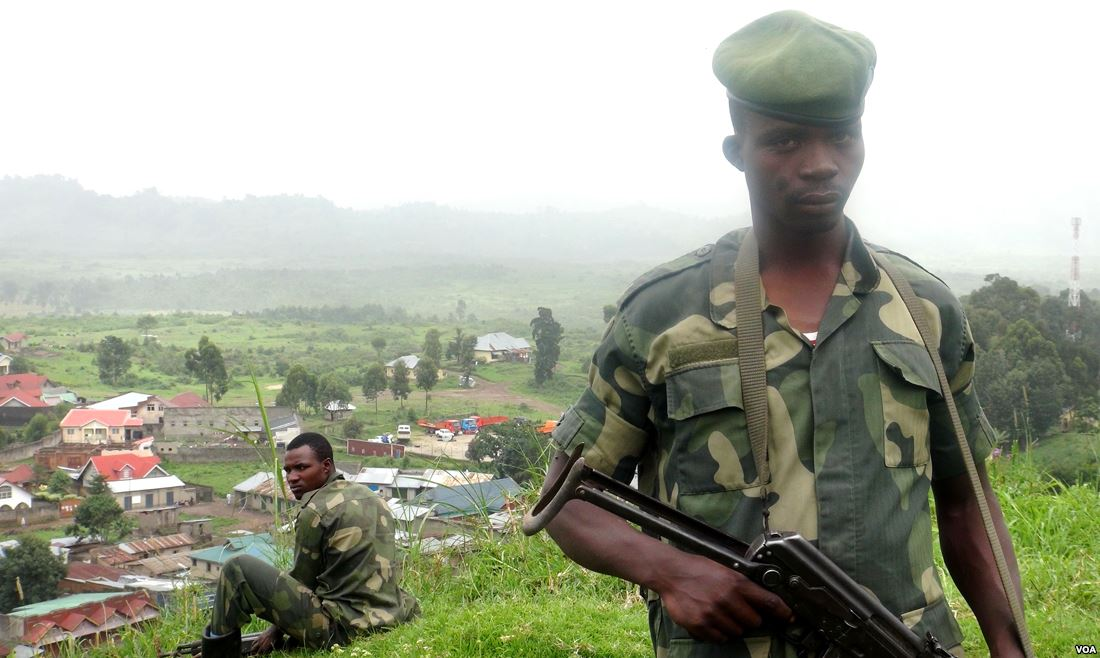
M23 rebels in Bunagana, located in Rutshuru Territory near the border with Uganda. In 2013, Bunagana served as the headquarters for the M23 group and is situated within a mineral-rich belt that contains significant deposits of coltan, a mineral critical for the production of electronic devices.

Initially, Rwandan support to the CNDP was characterized by limited logistical and advisory assistance. However, this evolved significantly during the 2008 military escalations. Rwanda's direct involvement became increasingly evident, particularly during operations such as the CNDP's offensive against the Rumangabo military camp and the advance toward Goma. Despite reports of internal tensions, Nkunda himself reportedly grew uneasy with Rwanda's increasing influence, Rwandan troops were deployed in support of the CNDP's strategic objectives.

Although some analysts have emphasized the economic motivations behind Rwanda's involvement, a broader strategic calculus appears to underpin Rwandan engagement in eastern Congo. Rwanda has consistently viewed the provinces of North and South Kivu as within its sphere of influence, citing security concerns and geopolitical interests. A central factor in this engagement has been the threat posed by the Democratic Forces for the Liberation of Rwanda (FDLR), whose presence in eastern Congo provided a longstanding rationale for Rwandan intervention.

From 2004 to 2009, CNDP activities were justified, in part, by the need to neutralize the FDLR. Subsequent repatriation programs have seen more than 4,500 FDLR combatants returned to Rwanda, significantly diminishing the group's operational capabilities. Meanwhile, the Rwandan economy has benefited from regional trade, including mineral exports, some estimates suggest that 10 to 30 percent of Rwandan mineral trade may involve smuggled resources from the DRC. Rwandan commercial and military actors have also been active in the Kivu provinces, participating in sectors such as livestock, fuel distribution, and other forms of commerce.

=== Leadership transition and integration into the FARDC ===
On 4 January 2009, Ntaganda announced the removal of Nkunda as CNDP leader, citing mismanagement. Nkunda, taken by surprise, was unable to prevent the leadership change. On 16 January 2009, Ntaganda declared the CNDP's integration into the Congolese army at a ceremony held at the Ihusi Hotel in Goma, attended by both Rwandan and Congolese government officials. Although the publicized aim of the Rwanda–DRC agreement was to initiate joint operations against the FDLR, a key objective was the consolidation and formal integration of the CNDP.

On 22 January 2009, Nkunda crossed into Rwandan territory at Kabuhanga, where he was arrested by Rwandan military officials. His associates, including Colonel Sultani Makenga, were instructed to proceed with the integration process. Soon thereafter, Rwandan and Congolese forces launched Operation Umoja Wetu ("Our Unity"), which involved the deployment of approximately 4,000 Rwandan troops into eastern DRC to combat the FDLR. Simultaneously, former CNDP officers were integrated into the FARDC and assigned key military positions, with assurances that they would remain stationed in the Kivus. On 23 March 2009, the Congolese government signed agreements with the CNDP and other armed factions, formalizing the integration of CNDP forces into the national army and marking the official dissolution of the CNDP. Key provisions of the accord included provisions for prisoner releases, the transformation of the CNDP into a political party, the reintegration of refugees, and the integration of CNDP members into government institutions and the Congolese army.

== Operations ==
=== CNDP integration and the formation of the M23 rebellion ===
Following the integration of the CNDP into FARDC, the Congolese government initially regarded this arrangement as a temporary solution to the ongoing instability in the eastern provinces. However, the integration process inadvertently consolidated the CNDP's influence within the national army. CNDP leaders, notably Ntaganda, utilized their positions to accumulate wealth through mineral smuggling, embezzlement, and unauthorized taxation systems. The CNDP leadership strategically co-opted officers from rival armed groups to broaden its base of power.

Efforts by the Congolese government to deploy former CNDP commanders beyond the Kivu provinces, initiated in September 2010, met with significant resistance. Former CNDP members justified their refusal by citing concerns over security, perceived anti-Tutsi discrimination, and unresolved hostilities with the FDLR. In response, Ntaganda sought alliances with ex-combatants from the Patriotes Résistants Congolais (PARECO), a group historically opposed to the CNDP. Talks held in Minova, South Kivu, in late 2010, aimed to forge a coalition of disaffected officers who accused the national military leadership of corruption.

In February 2011, the government launched a regimentation initiative to streamline the military structure and eliminate parallel command systems. This effort inadvertently strengthened Ntaganda's network, as he positioned loyal officers in key military posts. Exploiting the weak administrative oversight in Kinshasa, former CNDP officers retained substantial autonomy within the national army. Frictions within the CNDP ranks intensified, particularly between Ntaganda and Colonel Sultani Makenga. At the same time, Kinshasa attempted to promote Colonel Innocent Gahizi as a counterweight to Ntaganda. A United Nations report from December 2011 indicated that members of the CNDP, PARECO, and Forces Républicaines Fédéralistes (FRF) feared that the upcoming 2011–2012 electoral cycle would marginalize them within the FARDC.

As a preemptive measure, they sought to entrench their influence by securing command appointments during the regimentation process. The controversial elections of November 2011, widely criticized for electoral fraud, created an opening for international donors to demand military and institutional reforms. In response, the Congolese government moved to dismantle the CNDP network. A pivotal meeting in February 2012 between Presidential Advisor Augustin Katumba Mwanke and Rwandan officials included a proposal to offer economic incentives to secure Rwandan cooperation in deploying ex-CNDP officers outside the Kivus.

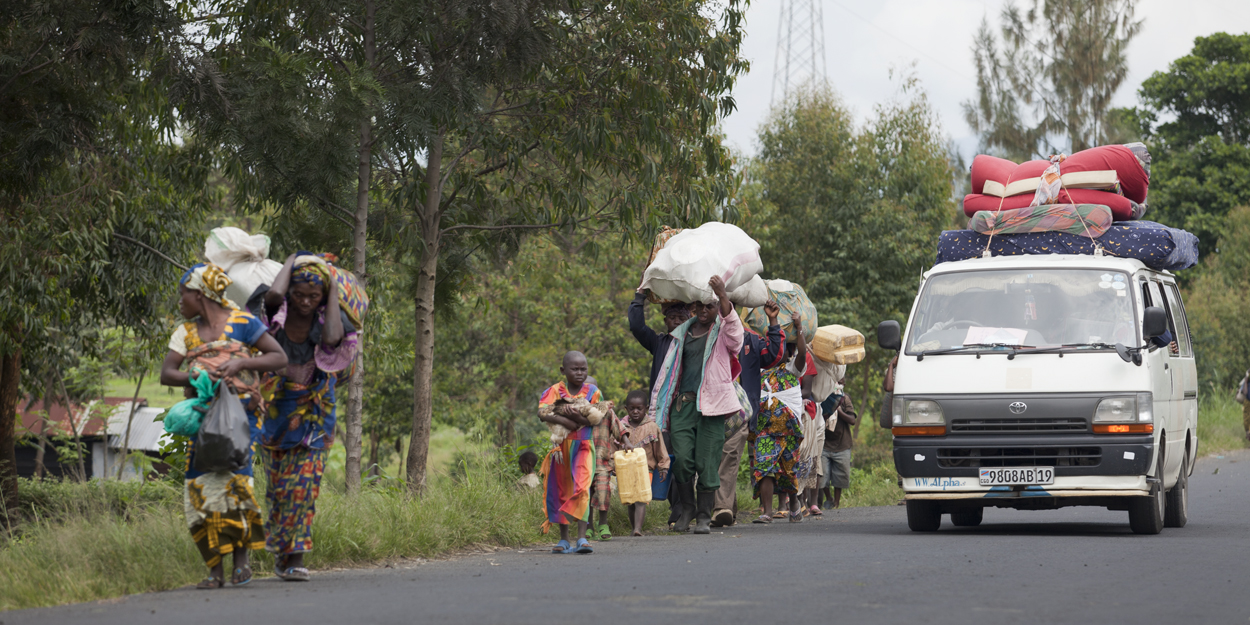
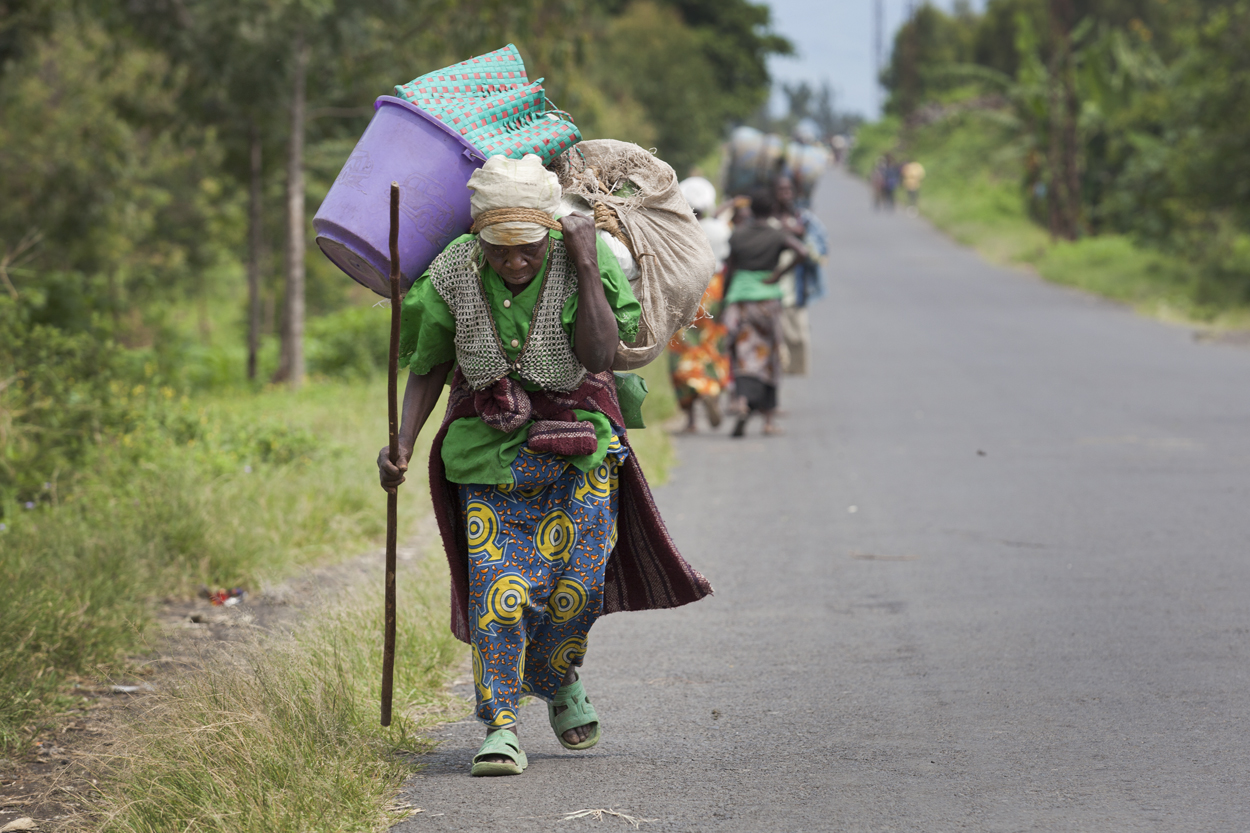
Residents fleeing their villages in Sake due to clashes between FARDC and advancing M23 rebels in April 2012.

The first signs of rebellion appeared in January 2012, when a mutiny attempt in Bukavu failed. The government responded by testing the loyalty of CNDP-affiliated officers through a series of military parades and reform workshops. Ntaganda, aware of the threat posed by these developments and increasingly targeted by the International Criminal Court (ICC), especially following the March 2012 conviction of Thomas Lubanga Dyilo, refused to comply.

In the weeks that followed, clandestine meetings among ex-CNDP officers resulted in limited defections across the Kivus. These early efforts were largely ineffective, as many mutineers expressed dissatisfaction over unequal resource distribution. Of the 365 soldiers who mutinied in South Kivu, the majority either surrendered or rejoined FARDC. A subsequent wave of defections in North Kivu also faltered. Several commanders capitulated, while others retreated into the Masisi highlands, where they urgently began recruiting new combatants.

On 8 April 2012, Congolese and Rwandan officials convened in Gisenyi and reached a tentative agreement allowing Ntaganda to remain in Masisi while an integration commission assessed the situation. President Joseph Kabila reversed this decision the following day, vowing to prosecute all deserters and enforce the nationwide redeployment of CNDP officers. This move reportedly alienated Rwandan officials, who, according to testimony from Ugandan authorities and M23 defectors, had covertly supported the emerging mutiny since 2011. Human Rights Watch accused the mutiny of committing widespread war crimes, including summary executions, rape, and forced recruitment, asserting that some Rwandan authorities could be complicit due to their continued support for mutiny's activities. In response to the mutiny, President Joseph Kabila called for Ntaganda's arrest on 11 April 2012.

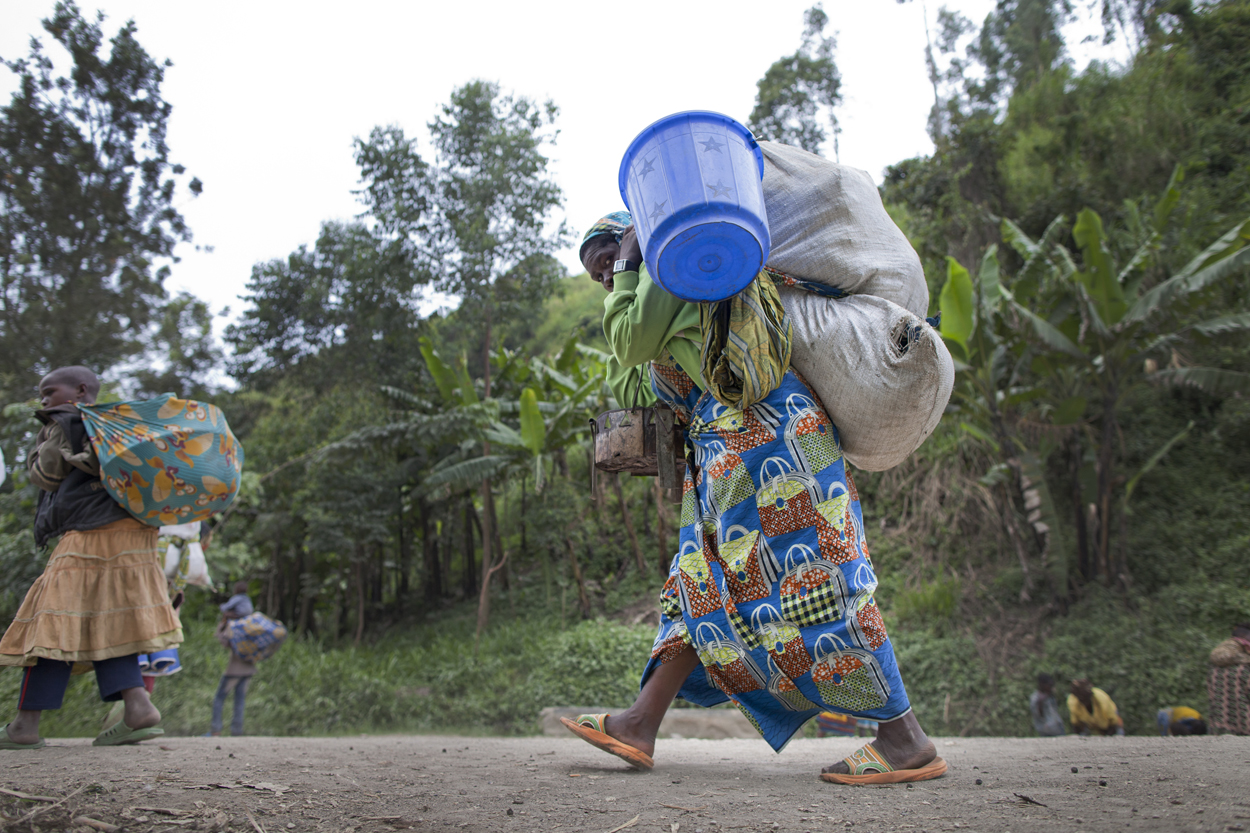
Displaced people evacuating their villages as a result of armed conflict between the FARDC and M23, in the Sake area of Masisi Territory, North Kivu

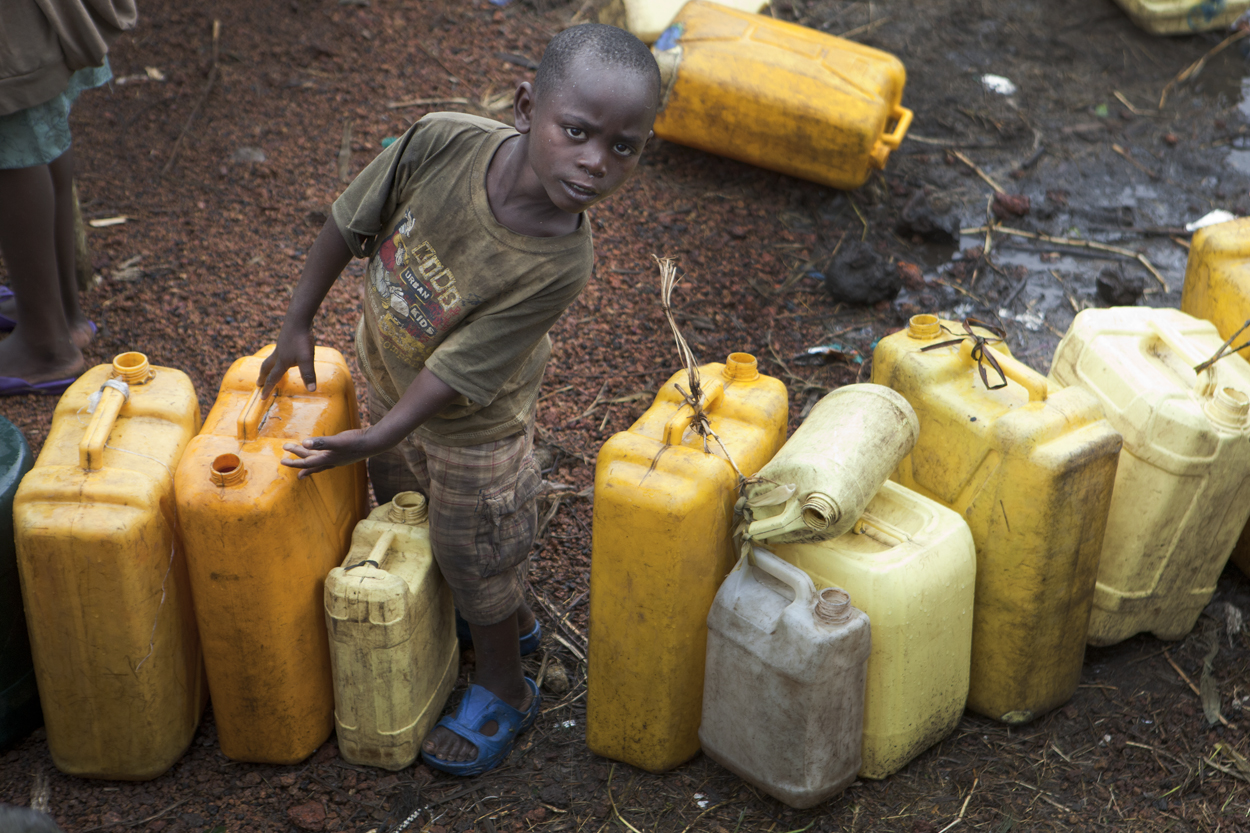
A young displaced boy waiting at a water point in the Kanyaruchinya IDP camp on the outskirts of Goma, where thousands of residents from Rutshuru Territory have gathered after fleeing armed conflict between the FARDC and M23 rebels

Facing mounting military pressure, the mutineers relocated from Masisi to areas closer to the Rwandan border on 4 May 2012, with Rwanda reportedly facilitating their withdrawal. On 6 May, Colonel Makenga and his officers formally defected, and two days later, the new rebel movement, March 23 Movement (M23), was officially announced. The group cited the Congolese government's failure to implement the terms of the 23 March 2009 peace agreement as its principal grievance.

M23's political leadership was largely composed of former CNDP officials, with Jean-Marie Runiga Lugerero appointed as the political coordinator. Reports indicated that several key positions within the M23 hierarchy were filled under Rwandan influence. In August 2012, M23's leadership structure was formalized, with Runiga appointed as president, and Makenga heading its military wing, the Revolutionary Army of Congo (Armée Révolutionnaire du Congo, ARC). Makenga was later sanctioned by the United States for orchestrating atrocities against civilians.

=== Motives ===
The M23 is made up primarily of Tutsis and opposes the Democratic Forces for the Liberation of Rwanda (FDLR), a Rwandan Hutu rebel group, as well as Mai-Mai militias—local community-based armed groups supported by the Congolese government. However, M23's operations have been controversial, with allegations that it and Rwanda have used the presence of the FDLR as a "justification for continued military and political interference in the DRC". The International Crisis Group has posited that, while the FDLR remains "too weak to imperil Rwanda's government", its continued existence functions as a rationalization for M23's activities and Rwandan involvement in eastern Congo.

FDLR leaders have historically resisted repatriation, citing concerns over imprisonment, the forfeiture of political clout, and political exclusion. Some have demanded an Inter-Rwandan Dialogue involving Rwanda's ruling party, the Rwandan Patriotic Front (RPF), and opposition groups in exile. Political analyst Jason Stearns has contended that while ethnically charged hate speech and violence against the Congolese Tutsi community have been longstanding issues, there was no significant increase in such trends before the M23 rebellion, which, rather than easing ethnic tensions, exacerbated communal divisions.

Paradoxically, Rwandan authorities have inconsistently extended protection to Congolese Tutsi refugees within their own borders and both CNDP and M23 were documented by the United Nations Security Council and Human Rights Watch forcibly recruiting civilians, including children, from Rwandan refugee camps, with Rwandan police in 2018 shooting and killing at least twelve Congolese Tutsi refugees protesting food ration cuts. Despite initially claiming to fight for human rights, democracy, and good governance, M23's actions, including forced displacement, war crimes, and resource exploitation, have contradicted these stated objectives.

=== Mutiny ===
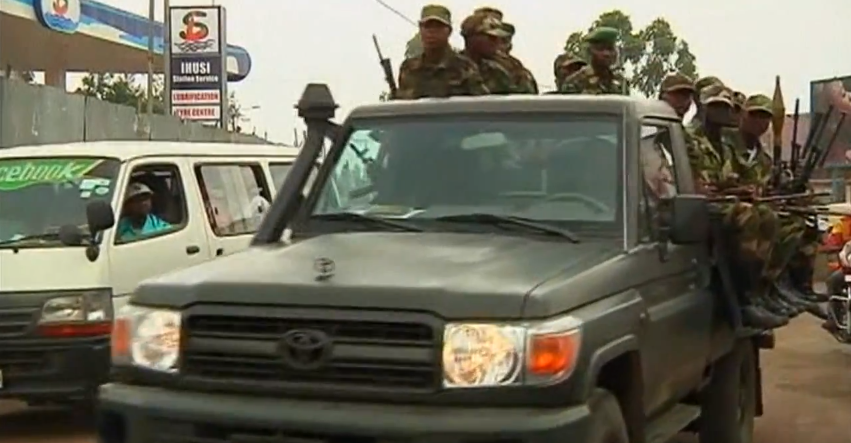
M23 rebels in Goma, November 2012

The rebels were active in North Kivu province, fighting government forces in the Rutshuru and Masisi territories. On 6 June 2012 a Congolese spokesman reported that 200 M23 soldiers had died in the mutiny and that over 370 soldiers had surrendered to FARDC, including 25 Rwandan citizens. On 8 July 2012, Colonel Sultani Makenga announced that a government offensive to dislodge the group from their hideouts had failed, and that they had in turn captured several towns towards Goma, the provincial capital.

=== First M23 rebellion ===
==== Nyiragongo Territory ====
The M23's military wing, the Revolutionary Army of Congo (Armée Révolutionnaire du Congo, ARC), began its rebellion in March 2012 in Masisi Territory. Following tactical reversals in Kitshanga, the M23 regrouped and commenced strategic offensives across the Kibumba groupement of the Bukumu Chiefdom, situated in Nyiragongo Territory. On the night of 26 April 2012, M23 fighters entered Nyiragongo Territory through the Kibumba groupement, targeting areas such as Katare, Burambo, Hehukalangala, and Kibiriga. After encountering resistance in the village of Kasizi, the group split into factions, with some heading toward Njerima and others crossing into Rwanda's Kinigi region to train young recruits. The M23 then expanded their operations, systematically attacking Rutshuru Territory and other parts of Nyiragongo, inching closer to Goma.

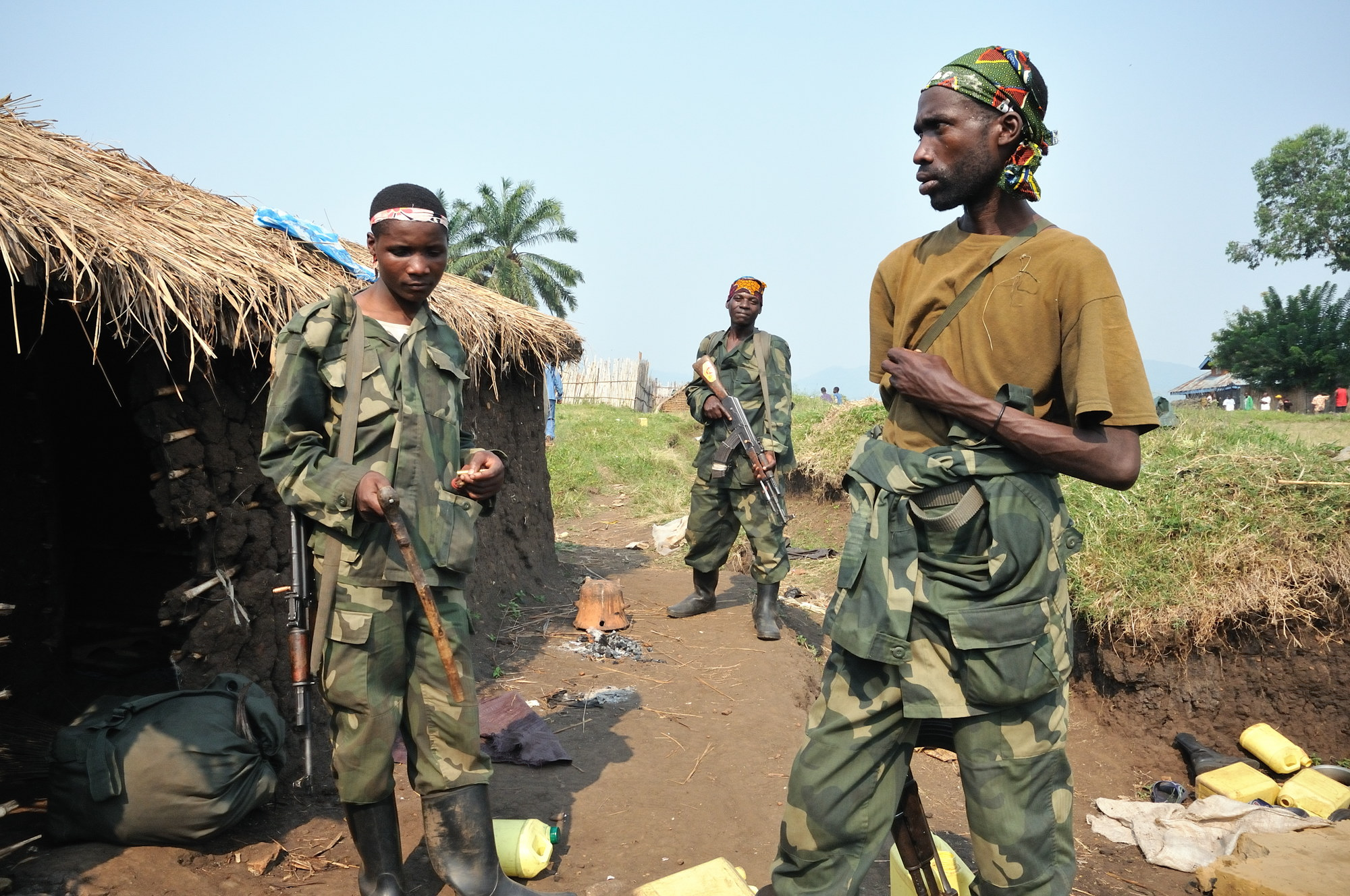
M23 troops stationed at the Rutshuru army base

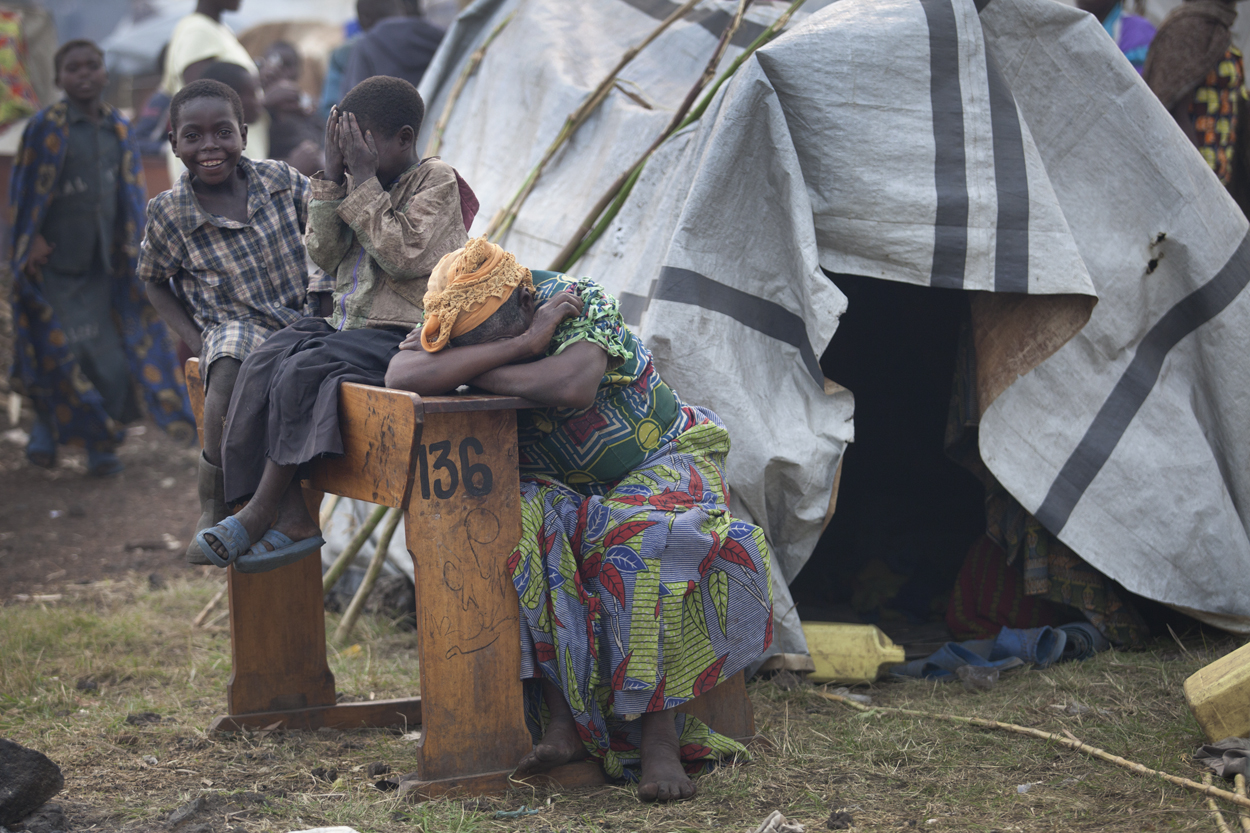
Displaced people from the Kibumba-Rutshuru axis, fleeing clashes between FARDC and advancing M23 rebels, set up camp in Kanyaruchinya, 4 km (2.5 mi) north of Goma, on 1 August 2012.

By July 2012, M23 had commandeered key strongholds in Rutshuru Territory, encompassing Bweza, Jomba, Kisigari, Bukoma, Kiwanja, and Rugari. This expansion was accompanied by widespread human rights abuses, including the forced recruitment of child soldiers, sexual violence, and the systematic looting of villages. In November, M23 intensified its activities in Nyiragongo Territory. On 15 November, Rwandan and M23 forces launched coordinated attacks on localities such as Kasizi, Hehu, Kibiriga, and Gikeri. Civilians bore the brunt of the violence, with multiple reports of rapes, kidnappings, and killings.

On Sunday, 18 November, Rwandan soldiers cross the bridge and meet the M23 to enter Kanjanja (a city located on the Rwanda-Congo border in the Kibati groupement near Kilimanyoka, which caused the escape of survivors from Rutshuru, Kibumba and Buhumba who will settle in the Kanyaruchinya camp and the Mugunga camp. M23 subsequently decimated the Kanyaruchinya camp, forcing over 50,000 displaced people to relocate to Mugunga. That same day, a bomb thrown by M23 killed two civilians, while other residents faced summary executions. Throughout their advance, the rebels engaged in systematic looting, sexual violence, and forced recruitment.

On 19 November, at 2:45 p.m., Rwandan military contingents breached the border in the Munigi groupement of Bukumu Chiefdom. On 20 November, M23 was observed systematically expropriating assets from displaced people in the Kibati groupement of Bukumu Chiefdom, including a documented case involving Joseph Nyandwi, a 54-year-old resident.

==== Masisi Territory ====
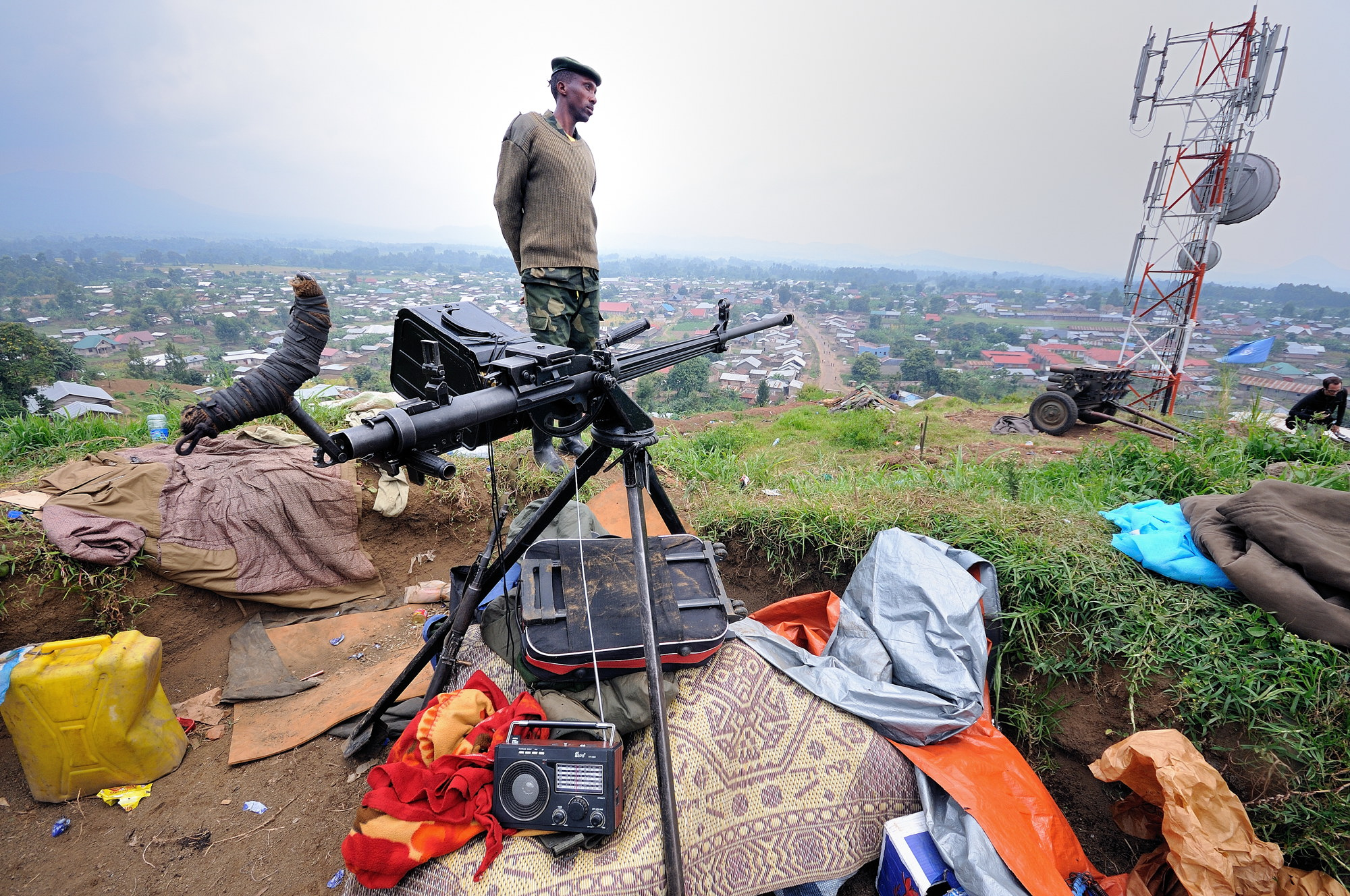
M23 militias armed with a Type 85 heavy machine gun in Bunagana

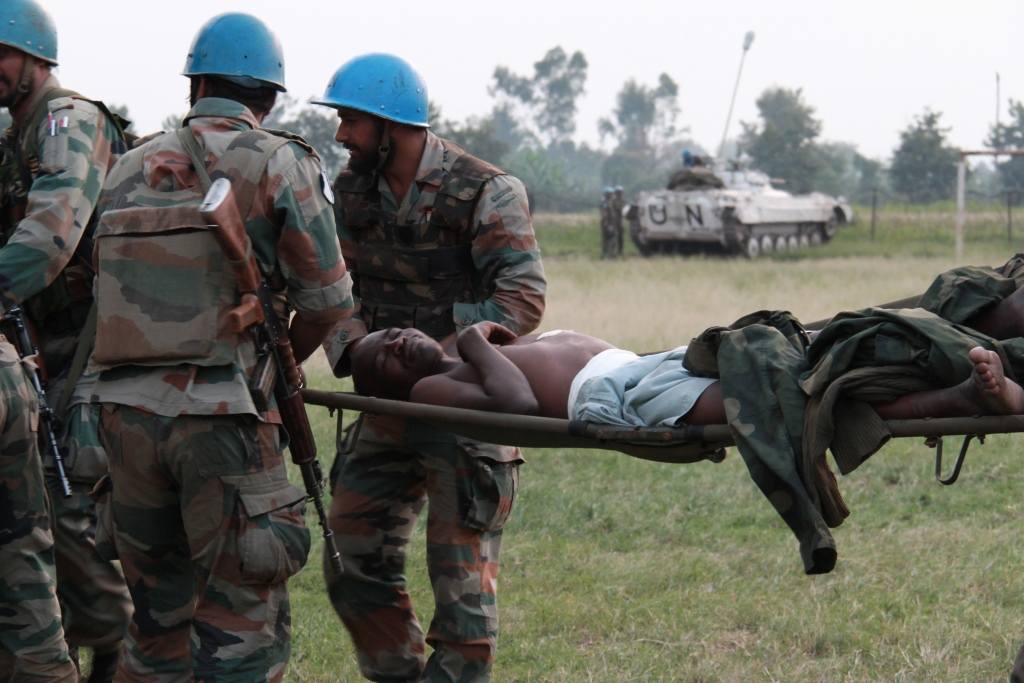
MONUSCO peacekeepers from InBatt 2 defend their Kiwanja base as M23 rebels launch an attack on the town. Several casualties were evacuated, and many civilians sought protection on 25 July 2012 in Kiwanja.

After taking control of Rutshuru Territory, M23 forces gained access to the headquarters of the Independent National Electoral Commission (Commission Électorale Nationale Indépendante; CENI). They removed electoral kits, which the group claimed was to secure the materials. However, critics argue that this act was intended to enable the potential fraudulent registration of Rwandan nationals, ostensibly to manipulate electoral outcomes.

The insurgents' operations in Masisi Territory were characterized by pervasive atrocities. Both isolated and mass killings transpired, particularly during clashes in key locations such as Mbuzi, Ntamugenga, Jomba, Bunagana, Kiwanja, Vitshumbi, and Nyamilima. The full scale of these massacres remains unknown. Civilians bore the heaviest toll, with violence including sexual assaults, verbal and telephone threats against local leaders, and indiscriminate gunfire in residential areas and on roads.

==== Lubero and Beni territories ====
In Lubero Territory, M23's growth was aided by FARDC defections. Key defectors included Colonel Albert Kahasha, also called Foka Mike, deputy commander of the 808th FARDC Regiment, who joined the Mai-Mai PARECO group under La Fontaine in Bunyatenge, south of Lubero, in June 2012. Another prominent defector, Colonel Yusufu Eric Mboneza, also from the 808th Regiment, departed with 10 soldiers to join La Fontaine's forces in Kasugho. Similarly, Lieutenant-Colonel Jaques Tahanga Nyolo, nicknamed Nyoro and a former RCD-K/ML leader, defected in July 2012 to regroup with M23-affiliated forces near Graben Park on the road to Kasindi, near Uganda.

Major Paluku Kombi Hiller, another ex-RCD-K/ML member, defected mid-2012, was later declared a "General", and focused on recruiting youth for M23-aligned militias. These defections weakened FARDC's control over Lubero, allowing M23 to solidify its influence and recruit more fighters. They escalated their campaign through strategic abductions and attacks. On 7 July, the administrator of Lubero Territory and the city chief of Kirumba were abducted by La Fontaine and Kahasha's group and released after enduring a week of harsh captivity.

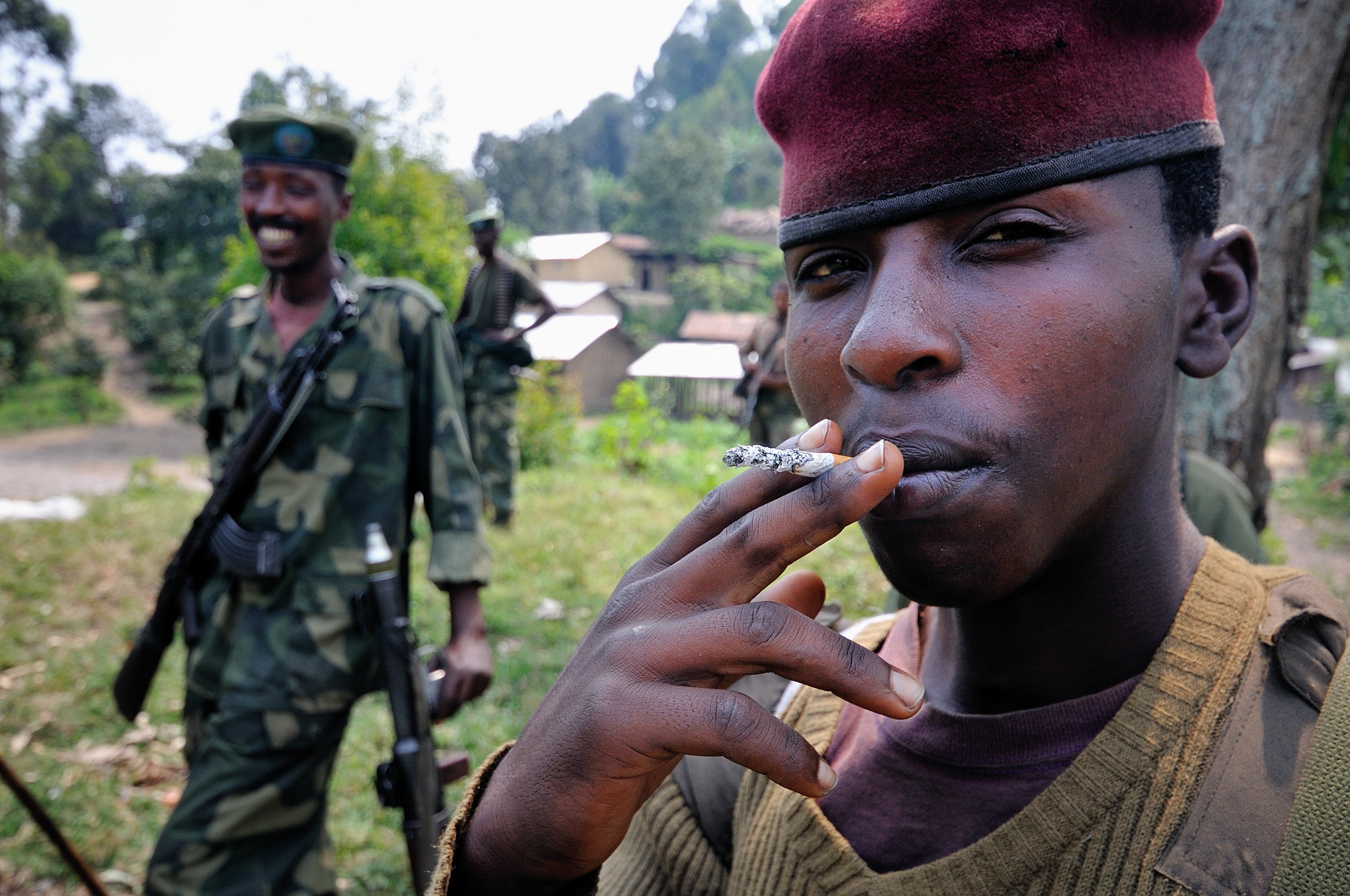
M23 troops

Beni Territory experienced increasing instability with the establishment of the Union for the Rehabilitation of Democracy in Congo (Union pour la Réhabilitation de la Démocratie au Congo; URDC) on 20 October. Led by Tahanga Nyolo and allied with M23, this faction established a foothold in the Rwenzori region. Serious human rights violations occurred, including the kidnapping of three Catholic priests from Mbau Parish on 19 October, whose whereabouts remain unknown. When M23 occupied Goma on 19 November, Tahanga Nyolo and Hiller Paluku, along with their forces, joined in the city.

==== Goma ====
In August 2012, the International Conference on the Great Lakes Region brokered a fragile truce between M23 and FARDC. However, skirmishes continued to undermine the tenuous ceasefire, which effectively collapsed in mid-October. On 9 November, the Congolese government issued a 14-day ultimatum for M23 to disarm. In response, M23 launched renewed offensives in Rutshuru Territory, targeting key locations such as Kibumba, Mboga, and Ruhondo. On 17 November, the rebels seized control of the Kibumba groupement in Bukumu Chiefdom, despite MONUSCO air interventions, and advanced towards Goma. Accusations of Rwandan involvement escalated, with Congolese officials asserting that Rwanda was backing M23 militarily. M23 forces had advanced to the outskirts of Goma by 18 November and warned MONUSCO not to support government troops. Congolese government spokesman Lambert Mende Omalanga accused Rwanda of backing the rebels. "The DRC has "not yet declared war, but we are ready to face it. This is our country". That Sunday afternoon, Goma was reportedly calm, with no gunfire or significant incidents, as confirmed by North Kivu Vice-Governor Feller Lutaichirwa. He stated that military authorities chose to retreat to "prevent a bloodbath" in Goma, described as a "displaced persons' city, trapped" between Lake Kivu and M23-occupied territory.

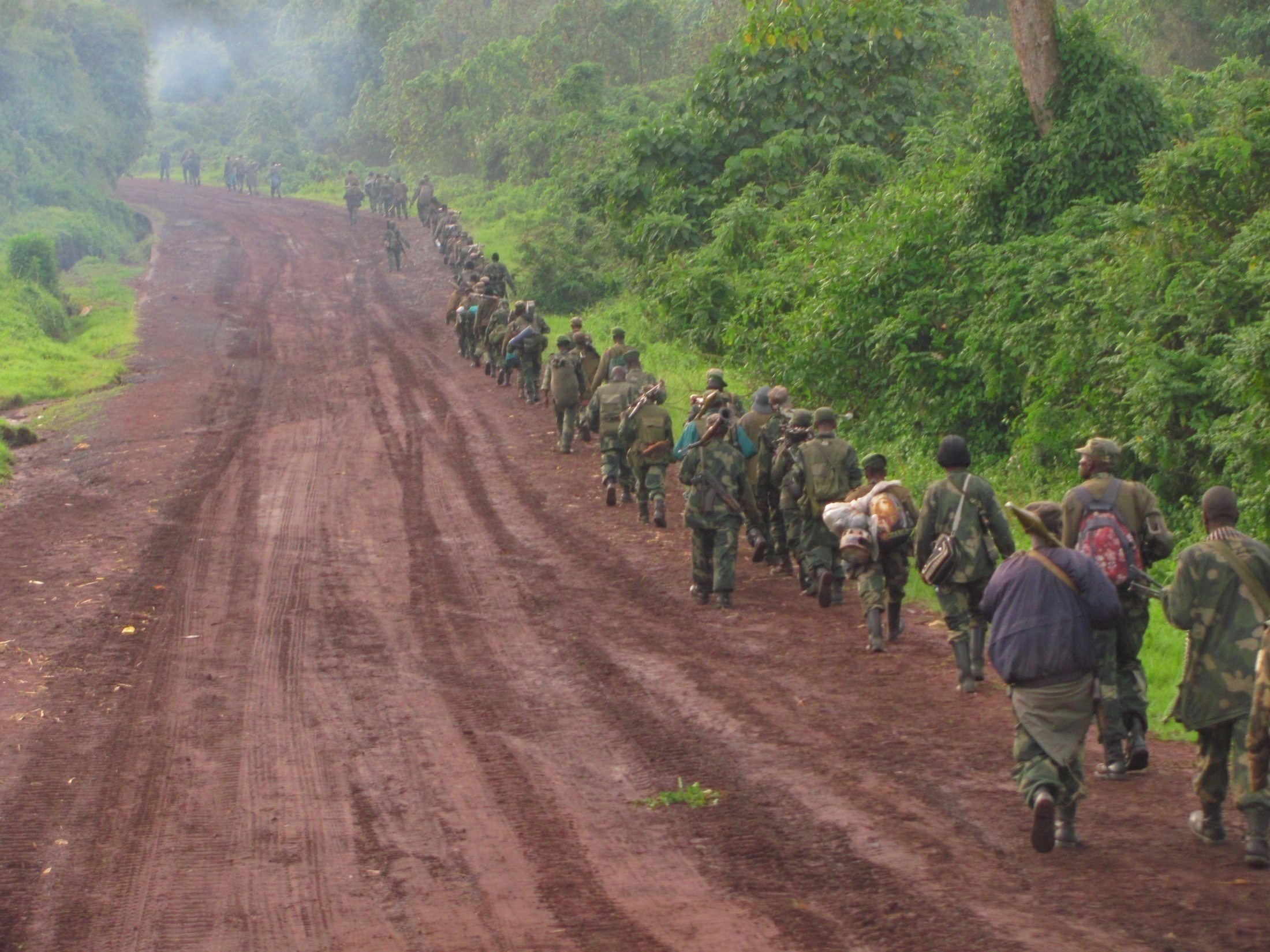
The FARDC during the M23 rebellion

On 19 November, UN helicopters fired rockets and shells in support of the government to halt the rebel advance toward Goma International Airport. Fighting resumed on Monday afternoon, with exchanges between M23 and FARDC striking a hotel on the city's edge. Gunfire was exchanged in Munigi and Mudga groupements, part of the nearby Bukumu Chiefdom to the north and northwest of the city. This prompted residents to flee south or toward Gisenyi, the Rwandan border crossing. A Heal Africa hospital worker reported receiving six wounded individuals, some in critical condition, due to shelling at a hotel near the city's edge. Soldiers blocked an AFP photographer from entering the combat zones, where Kalashnikov fire was audible. On 20 November, at approximately 11 a.m., Goma fell to M23 rebels, whose use of mortars, rocket-propelled grenades, and heavy artillery left nine dead and 64 injured, including civilians. Strategic neighborhoods like Bujovu, Birere, and Ndosho in the Karisimbi commune were seized rapidly. M23's conduct included the killing of a young boy suspected of Mai-Mai affiliation in the Ndosho neighborhood. In Murara, four deaths were reported, while three fatalities occurred in Majengo, both in Karisimbi commune. M23 advanced on Goma, while FARDC retreated with minimal resistance. The city was encircled by M23 forces, who entered through Gisenyi, paraded through the streets, and were welcomed by some residents. MONUSCO watched the occupation without intervening, stating that their mandate was limited to protecting the safety of civilians. Jeune Afrique later reported that M23 rebels acquired as well as six artillery pieces (type 26 and BM-type rocket launchers) approximately ~20 shipping containers filled with arms and ammunitions of various caliber, all of which were abandoned by the FARDC during their retreat from Goma.

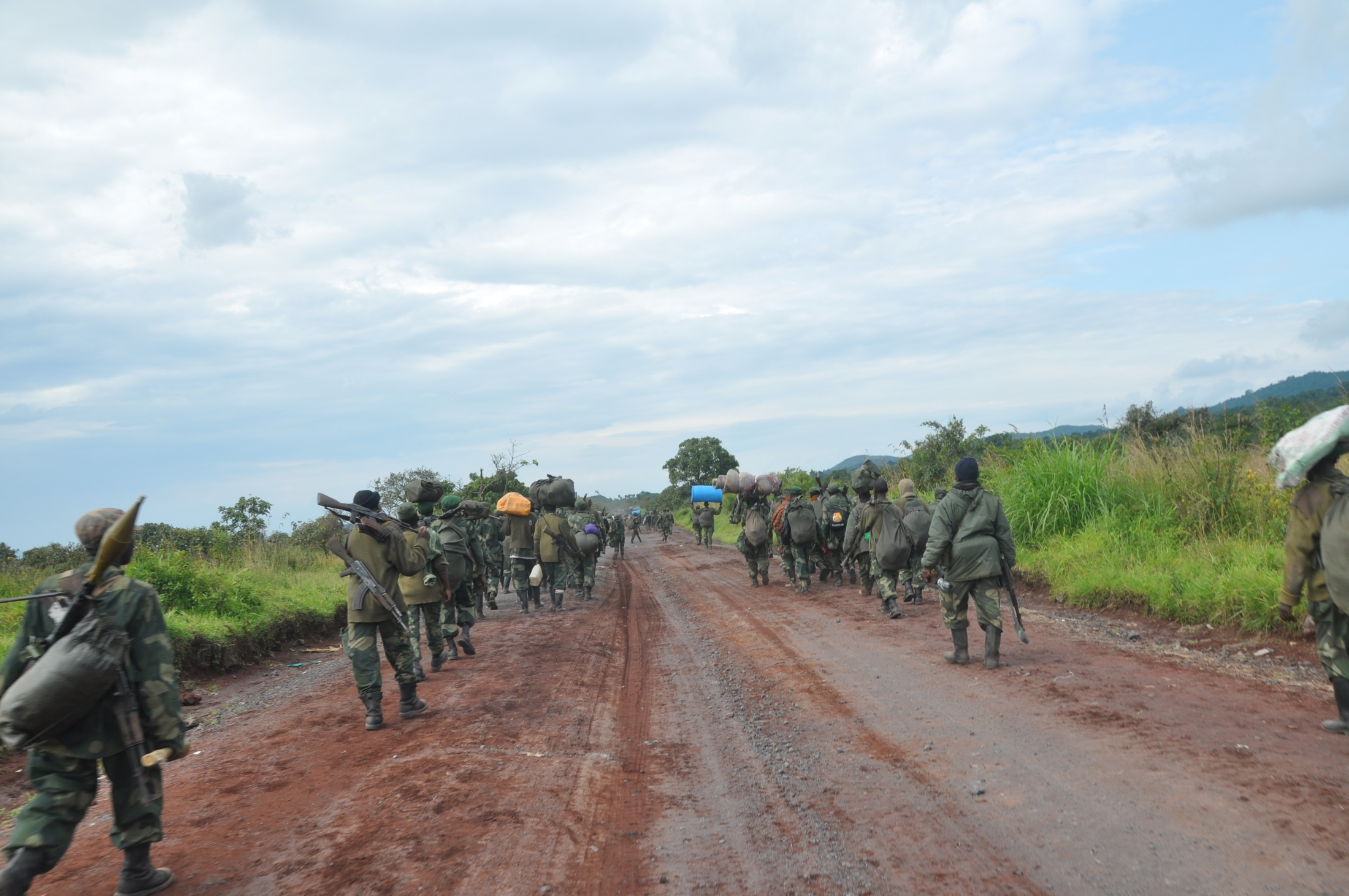
Soldiers marching along a road in Goma

Congolese president Joseph Kabila urged Goma's citizens to "resist" the M23 takeover. UN Secretary General Ban Ki-moon criticized the M23 for alleged human rights violations during the takeover, including "intimidation of journalists", and abduction of women and children. Noting that the First Congo War had begun with fighting in the same region, the New York Times described the takeover of Goma as "raising serious questions about the stability of Congo as a whole". On 21 November, further atrocities were reported, including the murder of a soldier's wife at the Katindo camp entrance. The attack occurred after a dispute with an M23 guard, who used a bayonet to kill her in broad daylight. The same day, the International Criminal Court (ICC) reopened investigations into Bosco Ntaganda and Sylvestre Mudacumura. In response to the escalating crisis, President Joseph Kabila convened with Rwandan President Paul Kagame and Ugandan President Yoweri Museveni in Kampala. The tripartite summit issued a joint communiqué imploring M23 to relinquish control of Goma. However, M23 refused, demanding direct negotiations with President Kabila as a prerequisite for withdrawal. The United Nations Security Council enacted Resolution 2076 (2012), unequivocally condemning M23's aggression and demanding an immediate cessation of hostilities. The European Union echoed these calls for an end to violence. Despite mounting international pressure, M23 remained defiant, conditioning its retreat on meeting its political and territorial demands.

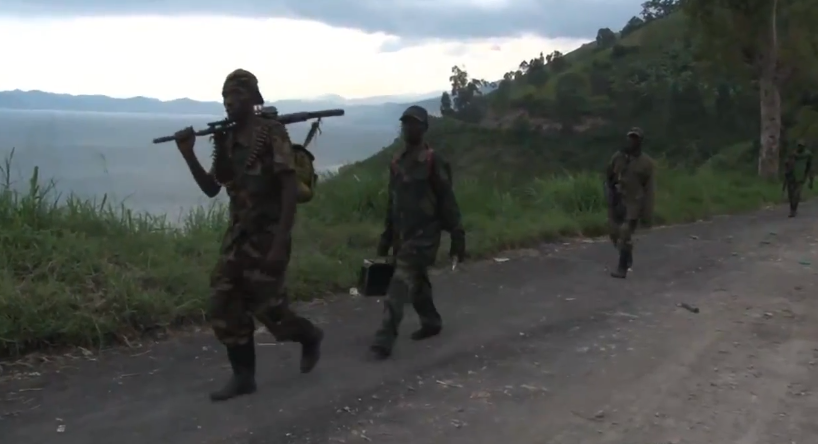
M23 rebels leaving Goma, 30 November 2012

On 22 November, the FARDC, in cooperation with local Mai-Mai elements, routed the M23 rebels from the nearby town of Sake, 27 kilometers from Goma, as they marched towards Bukavu. Also 22 November, Kabila suspended General Gabriel Amisi's FARDC commission because of an inquiry into his alleged role in arms sales to various rebel groups, including the FDLR, in the eastern part of the country, so it implicated M23. That day, M23 soldiers facilitated the extrajudicial killing of a suspected thief in the Ndosho neighborhood, where he was burned alive by a mob. The group justified the act by claiming a lack of detention facilities. On 23 November, M23 rebels retook Sake from the FARDC after an intense four-hour battle and reinforced their position in the town, as they reportedly moved toward Kirotshe to the south, Mushaki to the north-west, and Kingi to the north. Meanwhile, the FARDC reinforced their position in Minova, near the South Kivu provincial border, with more than 3500 soldiers. The UN has declared that it lost access to 30 of its 31 refugee camps in the area due to the M23 offensive.

On 24 November in South Kivu, Colonel Albert Kahasha, who had surrendered and joined government troops along with other leaders of Mai-Mai militia groups Raïa Mutomboki and Nyatura. On 13 November, he defected again from the FARDC. At a regional meeting in Kampala, leaders of the Great Lakes area gave M23 a two-day ultimatum to leave Goma. A combined force which would include international troops, a FARDC company, and a M23 company would be posted near Goma International Airport and would take charge of security. During the nights of 24–25 November, M23 soldiers looted homes in the Keshero neighborhood, stealing money and material goods. When the ultimatum expired on 26 November, M23 still controlled the city. The FARDC, had previously withdrawn after raping almost 126 women, some of them less than 10 years old, according to the United Nations and looting the money and possessions of the local population, came from Minova in a counteroffensive launched against M23 positions in the Masisi, North Kivu region on 27 November. M23 set up a road block on the road from Goma to Sake and reportedly extorted funds from drivers. That same day, M23 forces killed Uzaribara Baba Rehema, a father of six, and stole his vehicle. The same night, an assassination attempt was made on the Director General of the Higher Institute of Pedagogy, although he narrowly escaped.

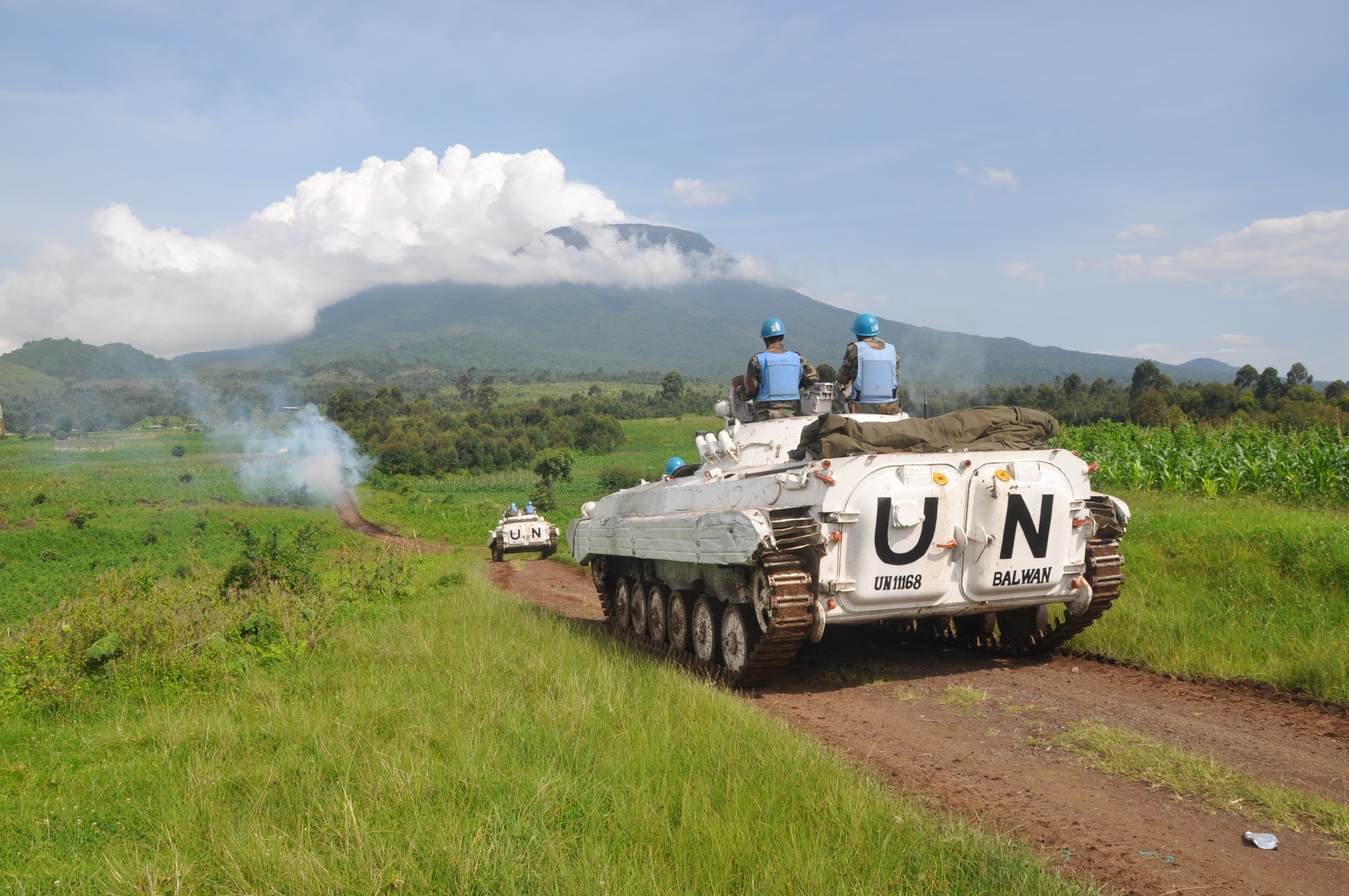
A column of BMP-2 armored vehicles from the Indian Armed Forces patrolling the outskirts of Goma, as part of MONUSCO operations

Between 20–27 November, M23 orchestrated the escape of approximately 1,500 prisoners from Goma's Munzenze central prison, including individuals serving life sentences. M23 also transported heavy weaponry and ammunition abandoned by FARDC to Rwanda via the Bunagana border. This included combat tanks and an estimated 1,000 tons of military equipment, reportedly moved under the observation of the MONUSCO. The office for Direction Générale des Impôts (DGI-Goma), the Goma Public Prosecutor's Office, and the Katindo camp hospital were stripped of movable assets, furniture, and equipment. Even museum artifacts from the governorate were looted. Vehicles and equipment from state agencies like the Office des Routes and the Office des Voiries et Drainage (OVD) were stolen and transported to Rwanda. The homes of provincial ministers, deputies, military officers, and other officials were ransacked, with valuable goods taken to Rwanda. Entire neighborhoods, including Himbi and Keshero, suffered similar fates, with civilians subjected to violence. Food stocks, vehicles, and donations from the European Union meant for the Congolese National Police were seized.

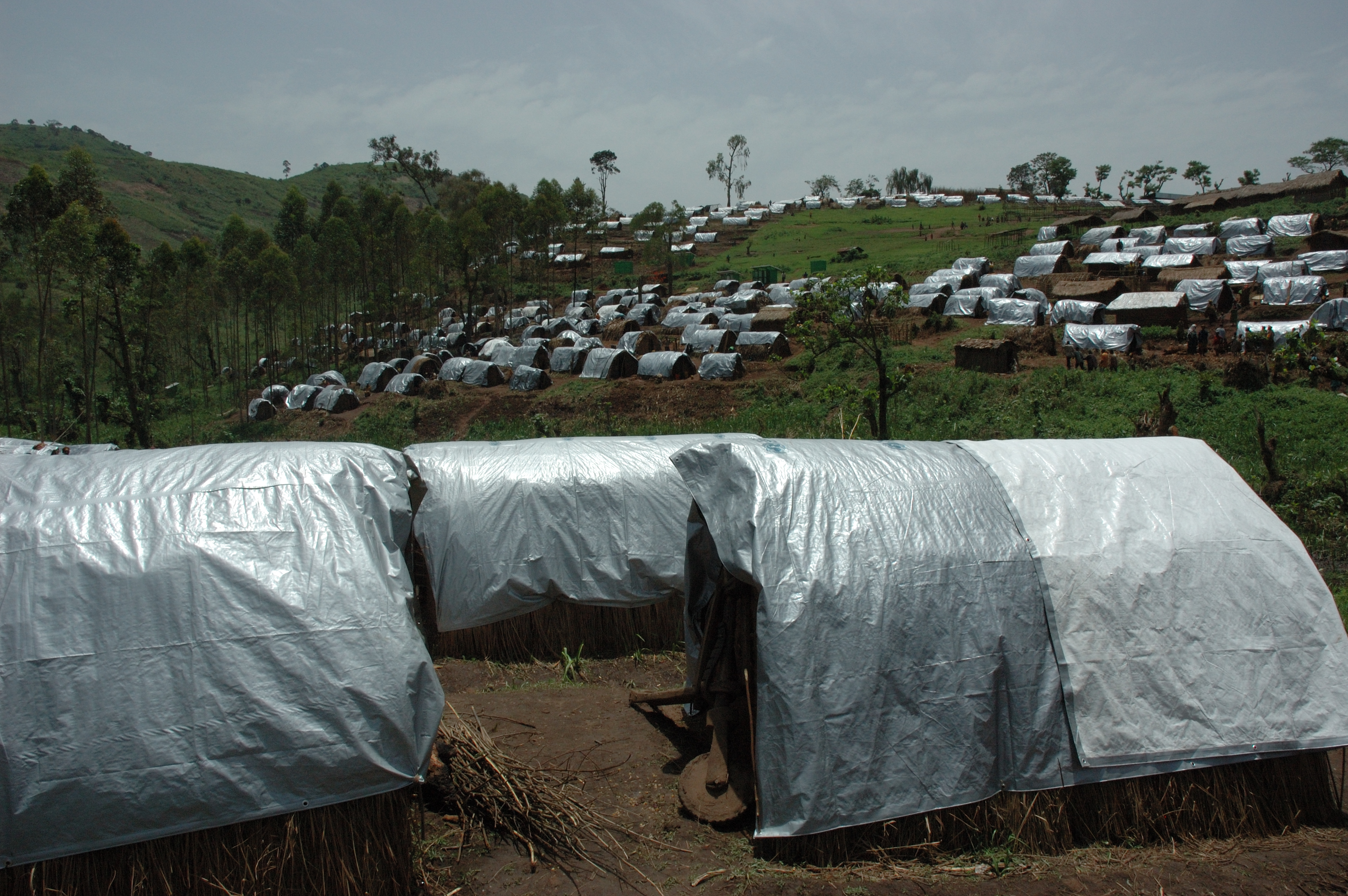
Nyanzale refugee camp, 150 km (93 mi) north of Goma

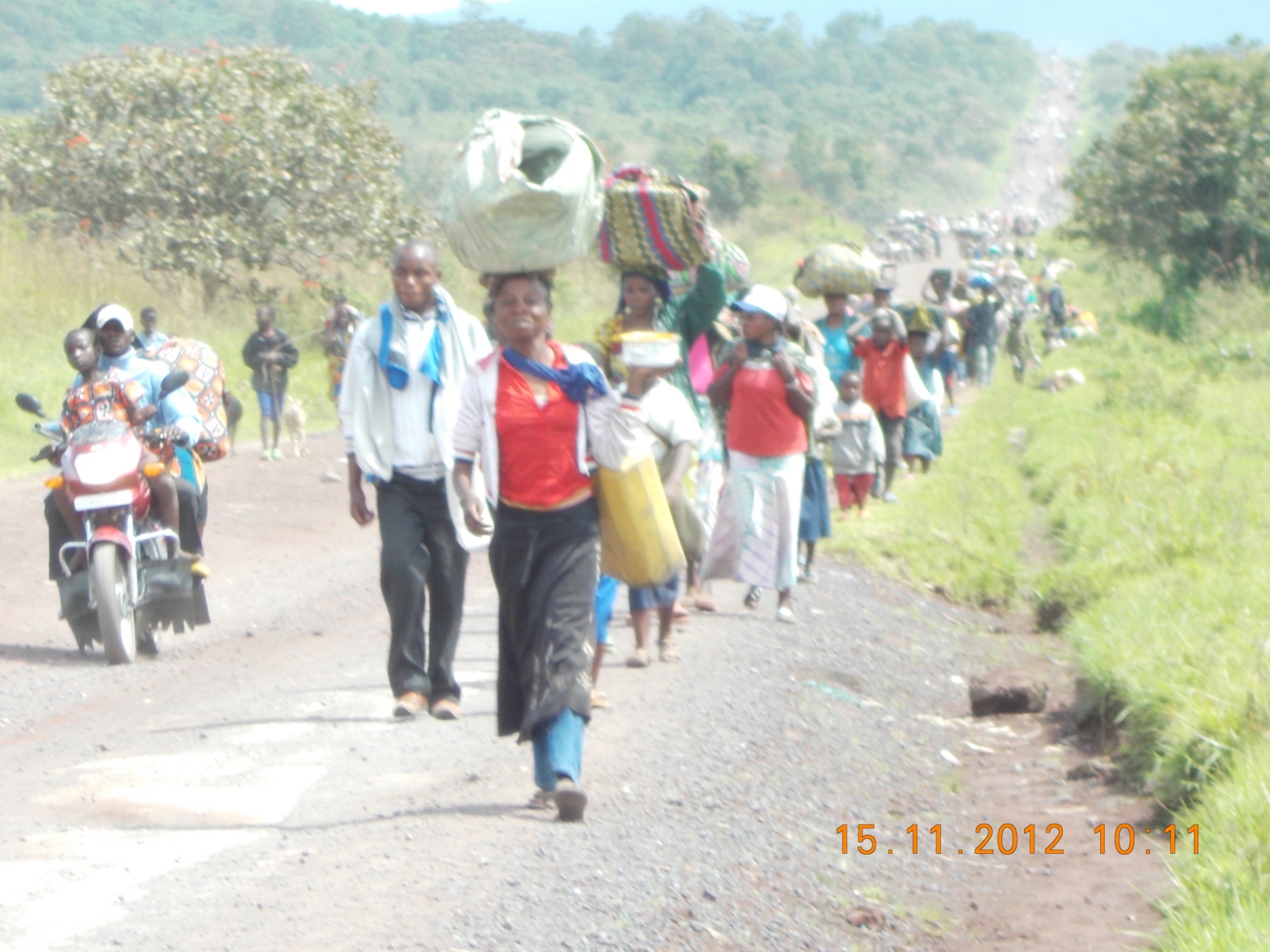
Refugees displaced by the rebellion

Following a peace deal negotiated in Uganda, the M23 said it would withdraw from Goma by 1 December. On 30 November, M23 troops began to withdraw from Sake and Masisi. That same day, a contingent of 200 police officers arrived in Goma in anticipation of M23's withdrawal. However, M23 operatives allegedly maintained a presence in the city, disguised in civilian police uniforms. The occupation of Goma triggered a massive displacement crisis; by 30 November, over 130,000 people had fled their homes and sought refuge in camps surrounding the city. Notable concentrations of displaced persons included 61,200 in Mugunga 1, 31,170 at Lac Vert, and 30,000 in Mugunga III. Living conditions in these camps were dire, with most displaced persons deprived of adequate humanitarian assistance to meet their basic needs. The Mugunga 3 camp, located 7 km (4.3 mi) from Goma, was also looted by M23, with rebels stealing food, clothing, and personal items from vulnerable individuals. Adolescents were reportedly forced to carry stolen goods, and six cases of rape were documented during the assault on the camp. Despite the presence of MONUSCO peacekeepers, M23 operated with impunity, openly transporting looted goods to Rwanda. On 3 December 2012, FARDC and Congolese government officials re-enter Goma, two days after M23 left the city.

On 24 February 2013, leaders of eleven African nations signed an agreement designed to bring peace to the eastern region of the Democratic Republic of Congo, among them Rwanda and Uganda. Both had been accused of aiding the M23 rebellion, a charge they denied. M23 was not represented either in the negotiations, or at the signing.

On 18 March 2013, Bosco Ntaganda handed himself in to the U.S. embassy in Kigali, Rwanda, where he requested transfer to the International Criminal Court in The Hague, Netherlands. Though the reasons for his surrender are unknown it was speculated that he was either pressured to do so by Rwanda or feared infighting within the M23 movement and its military leader Sultani Makenga, which had recently forced Ntaganda's forces to flee the DRC into Rwanda. Though Rwanda was not a signatory to the Rome Statute, the media speculated it would be forced to turn him over to the ICC. The U.S. also had listed him on its Rewards for Justice Program. On 22 March, he was detained by the ICC and appeared for the first time in front of the ICC on 26 March, to which he denied charges of rape, murder, and other offenses.

==== Masisi Territory ====
The capture of Masisi Territory was a strategic component of the M23 rebellion subsequent to their high-profile conquest of Goma on 20 November 2012. Seeking to expand their control into Masisi Territory, the M23 relied on allied militias, including Nyatura, Mai-Mai Cheka, and Raïa Mutomboki, to execute coordinated attacks and destabilize the region. Additionally, the M23 leveraged infiltrated elements of RDF within the FARDC to facilitate their operations.

To consolidate their position, the M23 sought control of key settlements, including Mushaki, Karuba, Ngungu, Rubaya, Kibabi, Kingi, Bihambwe, Lushebere, and Katale. From 24–25 November 2012, the group mobilized youth to infiltrate Masisi town, instigating unrest as a precursor to its capture. These efforts led to violent confrontations, resulting in five deaths, including a woman, and 13 injuries, among them a child. Victims were treated at the Hôpital Général de Référence de Masisi. Nyatura militias, predominantly composed of Hutu combatants, engaged in systematic violence, including looting, arson, and murder. They targeted villages primarily inhabited by the Hunde ethnic group. Villages burned by Nyatura included Rona (Biiri groupement), Buoye, and Buloto (Bunyungu groupement), as well as Bonde and Lushebere/Lwashi (Bapfuna groupement). The Nyatura forces were commanded by Mr. Munyamariba, a former militia leader affiliated with Rally for Congolese Democracy–Goma (RCD-Goma) and CNDP. In parallel, the Mai-Mai Cheka militia launched assaults on Kalembe village within the Bashali-Mokoto groupement of Bashali Chiefdom, aiming to secure the area for the M23. Similarly, Raïa Mutomboki, aligned with M23, perpetrated analogous acts of violence. These coordinated attacks instigated mass displacement, with residents fleeing into the bush. Panic spread to nearby towns, such as Kitshanga. Looting of goods and shops was rampant, and homes were set ablaze, including two houses within Masisi town itself.

=== End of the first rebellion ===
M23 split and factional clashes

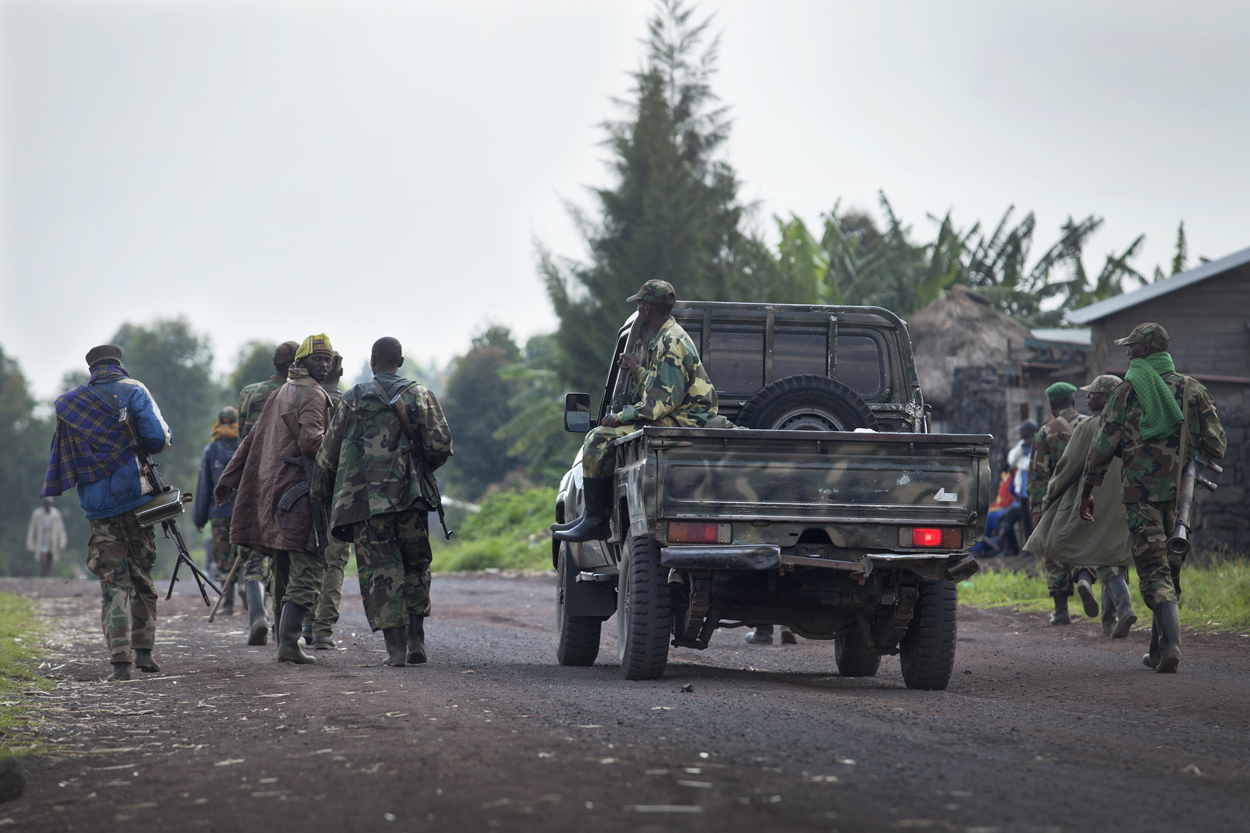
M23 fighters loyal to Bosco Ntaganda advance along the road towards Goma, as MONUSCO monitor a gathering of armed individuals north of the city in March 2013

On 28 February 2013, the M23 movement underwent a major internal split into two factions, primarily due to mistrust and power struggles between leaders Bosco Ntaganda and Sultani Makenga. Following the split, Ntaganda and his loyal officers fortified their positions in Kibumba, approximately 27 kilometers north of Goma. In contrast, Makenga retained control over Rumangabo, located further north. Reports from former Ntaganda followers indicated that he had grown increasingly paranoid about potential arrest, prompting him to enhance his personal security detail. Despite this, Ntaganda maintained the loyalty of a majority of M23's military forces. Meanwhile, the M23's financial resources became a point of contention; it was reported by the UN Group of Experts that Jean-Marie Runiga, who was then the Minister of Finance for M23, took the bulk of the movement's financial assets with him when he aligned with Ntaganda in Kibumba. Conversely, Makenga held significant control over the movement's weapons and ammunition stockpile. In the wake of these developments, both factions publicly denied any collaboration with Ntaganda. Bertrand Bisimwa, president of Makenga's faction, informed the UN Group of Experts that M23 leaders had uncovered Ntaganda's presence within M23-controlled territory. This prompted Bisimwa to issue a communiqué on 27 February 2013, accusing Runiga of granting Ntaganda "political leverage" over M23 and subsequently dismissing him from his presidential role. Runiga refuted these allegations in an interview, asserting that he had not seen Ntaganda since January 2012. As tensions escalated, Ntaganda reportedly sought to establish an escape route to Masisi. Reports indicated that Ntaganda maintained contact with François Mudahunga, a former member of the Congrès National pour la Défense du Peuple (CNDP) and commander in the Congolese army, in preparation for this potential flight. Together, they organized a contingent of approximately 50 people to assist with Ntaganda's escape and to retrieve ammunition from his caches in the Masisi region.

Clashes between the two M23 factions erupted on 28 February. Observers, including former Rwandan army officers and political collaborators, noted that while some Rwandan military personnel had expressed support for Ntaganda, they were backing Makenga. Demobilized Rwandan soldiers were reported to have joined Makenga's forces, significantly bolstering his military capabilities. Makenga's faction possessed a tactical edge, commanding the majority of heavy weaponry looted in Goma, as well as arms captured during prior military engagements. The confrontation saw the employment of heavy ordnance, including tanks, multi-barrel rocket launchers, and heavy machine guns, which facilitated Makenga's offensive against Ntaganda. Disinformation tactics employed by Rwandan officers further compromised Ntaganda's position, leading to his eventual defeat. Despite earlier assurances from some Rwandan officers, Ntaganda ultimately found himself without the promised military support. As supply lines faltered, Ntaganda's forces began to dwindle.

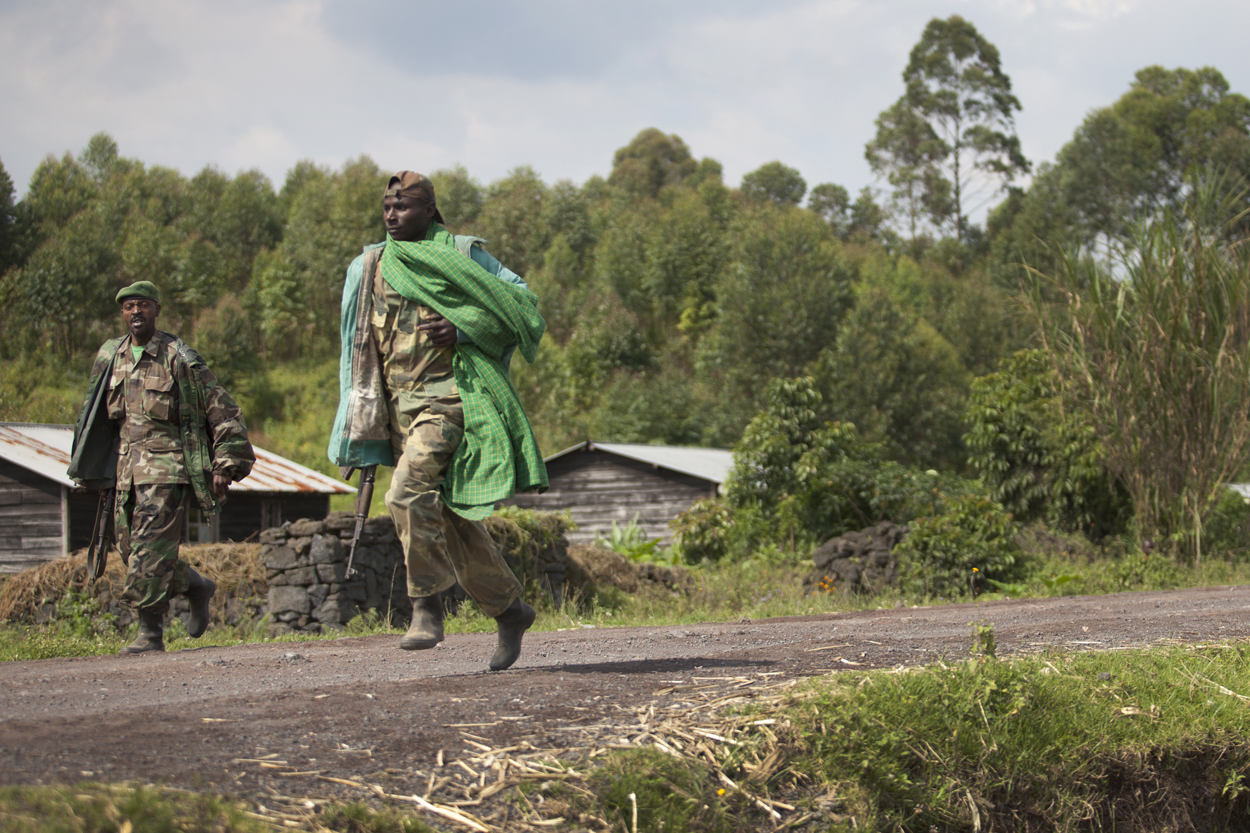
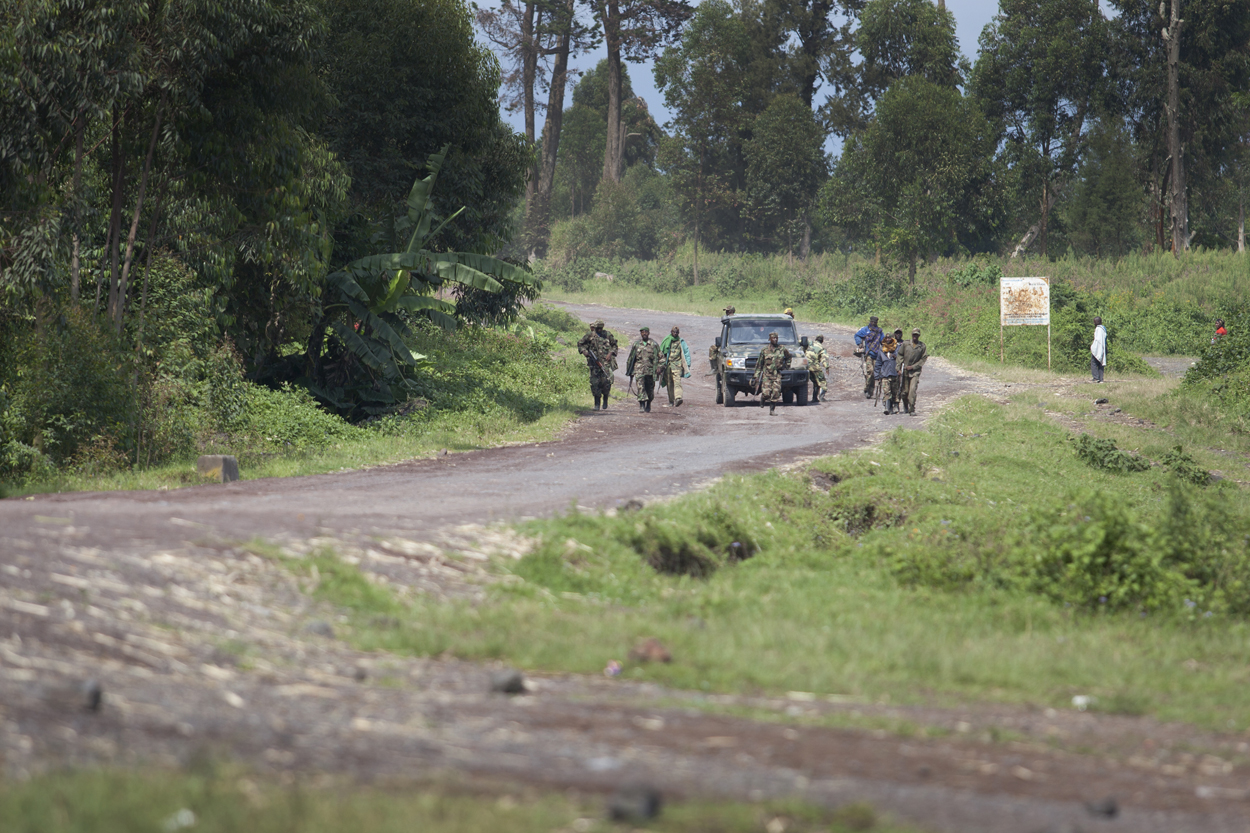
M23 fighters loyal to Bosco Ntaganda

By mid-March, as Ntaganda's situation became increasingly dire, he attempted to escape to Rwanda. However, during this same period, Rwandan troops apprehended several of his fleeing soldiers and returned them to Makenga's forces. Fearing for his life, Ntaganda sought refuge in Rwanda, crossing the border clandestinely on 15 March. Upon reaching Kigali, he sought asylum at the United States embassy, where he requested to be transferred to the International Criminal Court (ICC), independent of Rwandan government knowledge. As a consequence of these developments, the Rwandan authorities apprehended individuals suspected of assisting Ntaganda's escape and conducted interrogations of his family members. The Joint Verification Mechanism of the International Conference on the Great Lakes Region reported the crossing of approximately 788 people, comprising M23 combatants and political affiliates, into Rwanda beginning 15 March. In contrast, around 500 troops from Ntaganda's faction surrendered to Makenga within the DRC on 16 March, while Rwandan forces disarmed those who entered Rwanda, recovering a significant cache of weaponry. In light of escalating violence, the United Nations Security Council authorized the deployment of an intervention brigade as part of the United Nations Organization Stabilization Mission in the DRC (MONUSCO) to conduct targeted offensive operations, with or without the collaboration of the Congolese national army, against armed groups that posed threats to peace in eastern DRC. The brigade was stationed in North Kivu and comprised a total of 3,069 peacekeepers. Its mandate encompassed the neutralization of armed groups, the reduction of risks to state authority and civilian security, and the creation of a conducive environment for stabilization activities. Following Ntaganda's transfer to the ICC on 22 March, Rwandan authorities relocated Runiga, Col. Baudouin Ngaruye, Col. Innocent Zimurinda and Col. Eric Badege associated with him and his faction after the DRC issued arrest warrants. These individuals were accused of war crimes, crimes against humanity, and establishing an insurrectional movement. They were also listed by the UNSC Committee established under 2004 resolution 1533. Additional M23 members were suspected of human rights violations, with some potentially facing judicial action within the DRC.

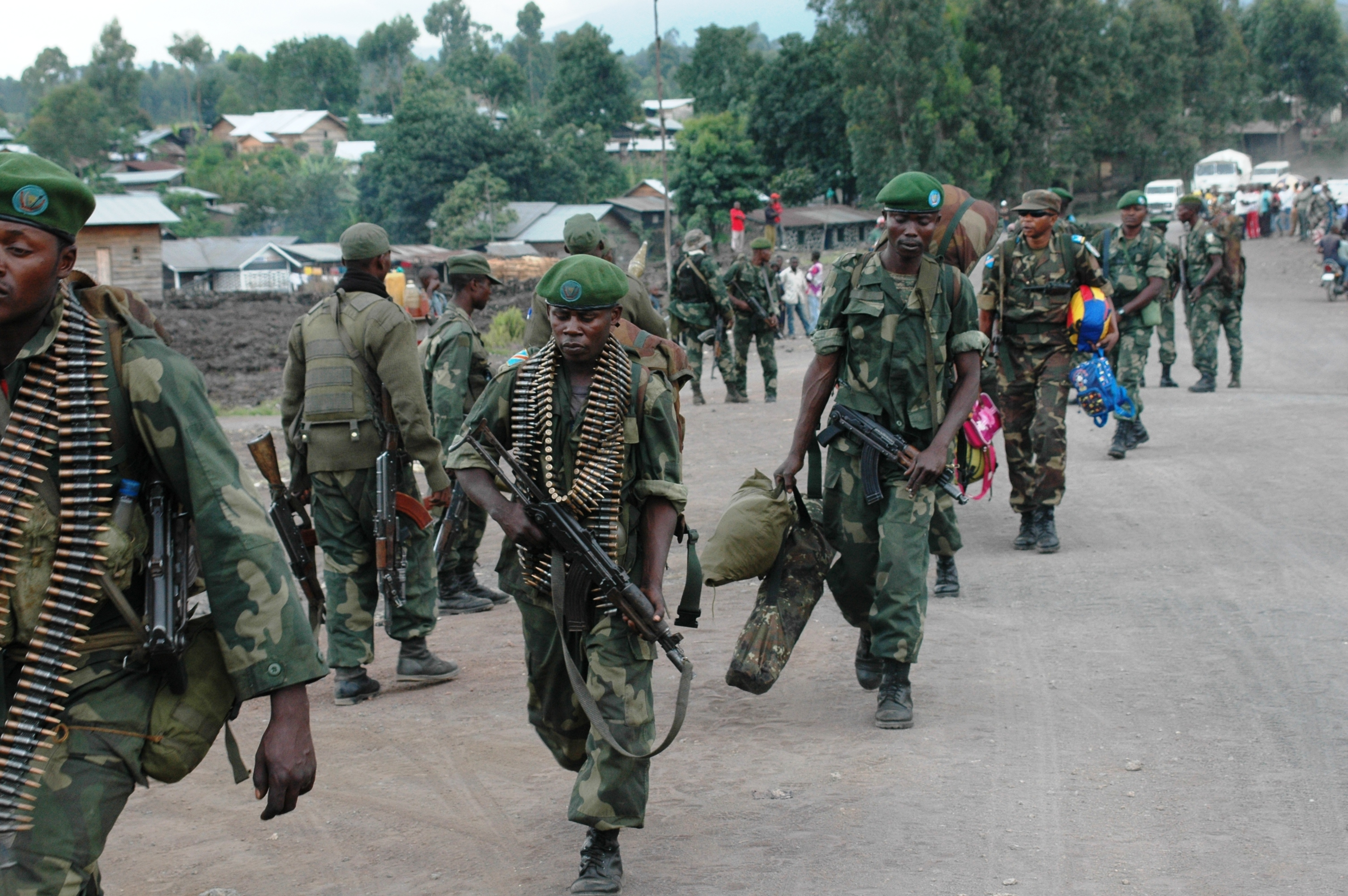
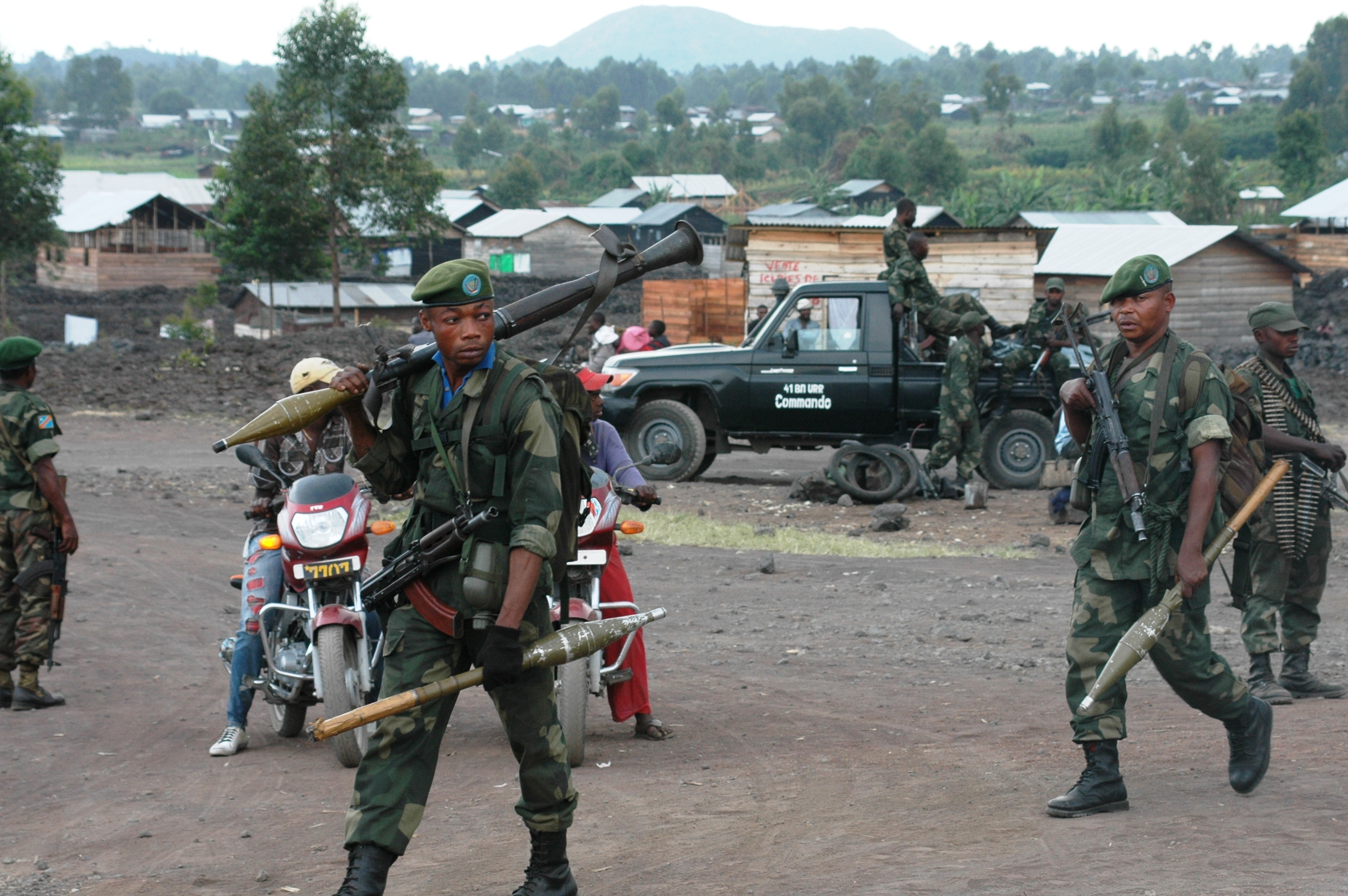
FARDC soldiers reinforce their positions around Goma after a second day of intense fighting on 21 May 2013, against M23 militants in the town of Mutaho, located approximately 10 kilometers from Goma

Following Ntaganda's defeat, Makenga was left in command of a diminished M23 force, consisting of approximately 1,500 soldiers dispersed over an area of 700 square kilometers. Between 20 March and 19 June 2013, a total of 246 M23 combatants surrendered to the UN peacekeeping mission's Disarmament, Demobilization, Repatriation, Reintegration, and Resettlement (DDRRR) Section. Many others either surrendered to the FARDC or fled. The withdrawal of support from key leaders and communities in Northern Rwanda, who had previously supported Ntaganda, resulted in a significant decline in the M23's recruitment and financial networks. Troop shortages compelled Makenga to abandon several positions held by M23. In a bid to bolster the movement's numbers, Makenga sought to recruit additional fighters from the DRC, Rwanda, and Uganda. Although he received some assistance from sympathetic Rwandan officials who facilitated recruitment in Rwanda, Ugandan authorities disrupted multiple M23 recruitment efforts on their territory. Recruitment from Rwanda saw a decline following the dismantling of Ntaganda's organizational network. Local leaders in northern Rwanda who had once supported Ntaganda ceased their cooperation with the M23. However, by the end of March 2013, the movement had acquired approximately 200 recruits, including some from refugee camps in Rwanda and others—such as children—from the Rutshuru and Masisi territories. M23 also made efforts to recruit individuals from refugee camps in western Uganda. On 20 May, three days before a planned visit by the UN Secretary-General to Goma, M23 made an unsuccessful attempt to seize Mutaho Hill, a position held by the Congolese army which was defending Goma. In preparation for this action, M23 redeployed troops towards Goma and relocated heavy weaponry to the south. However, faced with resistance from FARDC, the rebels retreated to their initial positions. The M23 forces encountered shortages of ammunition, a lack of rockets and shells, and suffered significant casualties—40 dead and over 30 injured—culminating in a unilateral ceasefire after failing to receive promised military support from Rwanda. On 21–22 May, M23 launched five 122-mm artillery rounds into heavily populated areas of Goma, including the Mugunga camp for internally displaced persons. Reportedly, M23 commanders regularly met with Rwandan army officers during this period. From March to May 2013, the UN Group of Experts observed meetings between M23 colonels Kaina and Yusuf Mboneza and Rwandan military officials at the border near Kabuhanga. Former members of M23 indicated that some Rwandan army officers, or their representatives, also traveled to locations such as Chanzu or Rumangabo for discussions with Makenga. By early June 2013, M23 continued to maintain troops in advanced positions close to Goma, with Makenga indicating to his forces that operations against Goma would soon resume.

==== Diplomatic developments and end of the first rebellion ====
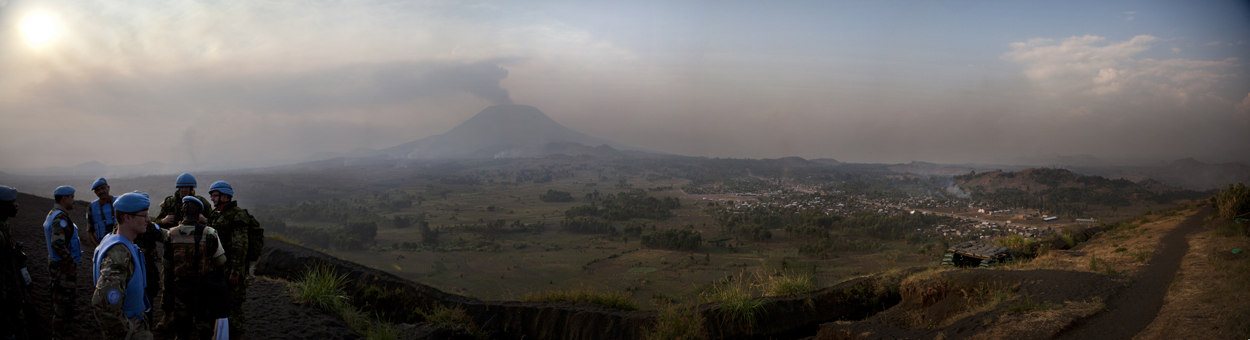
Clashes between FARDC and M23 forces in Kanyaruchinya, July 2013

Negotiations between the Congolese government and Makenga's M23 recommenced in Kampala in June 2013. Although Makenga had assured his soldiers of their integration into the Congolese army in the event of a victory against Ntaganda, several former M23 soldiers reported to the UN Group of Experts that Makenga was planning a renewed offensive against Goma. From 1 January to 9 June 2013, 57 people who declared themselves as former M23 soldiers and Rwandan nationals were demobilized and repatriated by the MONUSCO's DDRRR Section. However, during an assessment in May 2013, a camp official indicated that no former M23 combatants had yet arrived at the designated demobilization camp in Rwanda. Furthermore, fourteen former M23 soldiers reported to the UN Group of Experts that Rwandan nationals who deserted from M23 and attempted to return directly to Rwanda were forcibly returned to M23 by Rwandan army personnel. On 12 July, Crispus Kiyonga, Uganda's Minister of Defence and facilitator of the negotiations, presented a revised draft agreement based on contributions from both parties. Although this draft indicated some advancement in the discussions, it required further negotiation and refinement, particularly regarding three contentious issues: integration, disarmament, and amnesty for M23 members. The United Nations opposed offering amnesty to individuals accused of serious international crimes, as outlined in the 2006 Guidelines for United Nations Representatives on Certain Aspects of Negotiations for Conflict Resolution. The Congolese government, in March 2013, echoed this stance, disapproving of amnesty provisions for serious crimes. On 19 July 2013, the Group of Experts assisting the UNSC Committee established under resolution 1533 submitted its interim report to the Committee, indicating that M23 continued to receive limited support from Rwanda. On 31 July, a summit of the International Conference on the Great Lakes Region (ICGLR) convened in Nairobi, reaffirming commitment to the Framework and the Kampala dialogue. The summit called on various envoys to assist in the process and acknowledged the Technical Support Committee's efforts in establishing benchmarks for implementing the peace, security, and cooperation framework. The summit urged increased collaboration between MONUSCO and regional security mechanisms, while also expressing interest from Kenya and Sudan in joining the framework, with leaders requesting that the UN consider their applications. Following consultations with the African Union and SADC, both nations were invited to participate in the Regional Oversight Mechanism meeting in New York on 23 September.

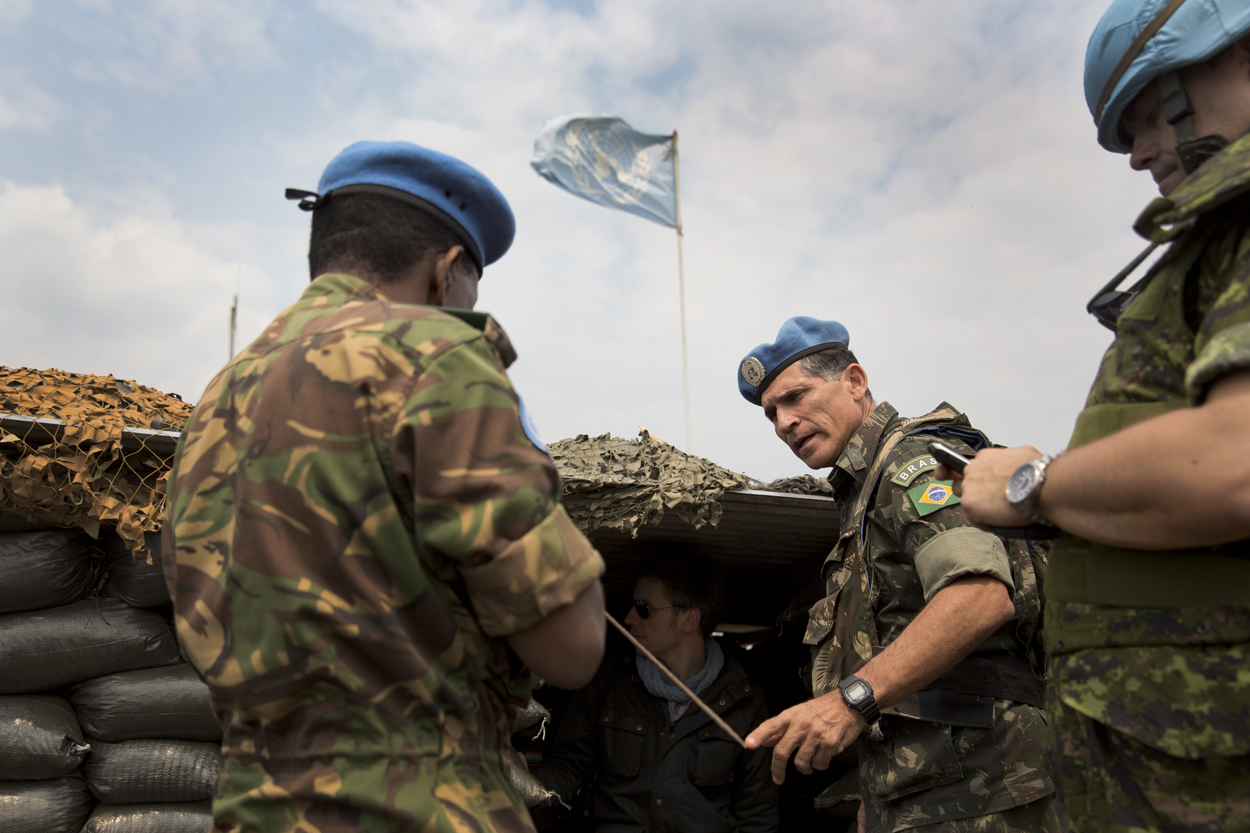
MONUSCO Force Commander Santos Cruz issues orders to engage M23 rebels with artillery from the United Nations Force Intervention Brigade after the rebels fired several rounds towards MONUSCO positions in the security zone on Munigi Hill on 22 August 2013

The thirty-third SADC summit, held in Lilongwe on 17–18 August, reiterated regional support for the Framework, commended UNSC resolution 2098, recognized the extended Kampala dialogue between the DRC and M23, and urged all Congolese stakeholders to engage in the upcoming national dialogue. Hostilities resumed from 22 to 29 August 2013, during which the M23 rebel group shelled residential areas in Goma and targeted MONUSCO positions in the Munigi Hills of the neighboring Bukumu Chiefdom. This outbreak of violence resulted in the deaths of eight civilians and injuries to at least 40 others, including a United Nations peacekeeper from Tanzania, who was killed, along with injuries sustained by 14 additional peacekeepers from South Africa and Tanzania. As part of its mandate to protect civilians, the MONUSCO Force Intervention Brigade assisted the FARDC in dislodging M23 from its positions on the Munigi Hills. During this period of violence, artillery shells were also fired into Rwandan territory, leading to civilian casualties, including one death and serious injuries to a child. On 23 August, Martin Kobler, the Special Representative for the Democratic Republic of the Congo and Head of MONUSCO, together with Flavia Pansieri, the United Nations Deputy High Commissioner for Human Rights, publicly condemned the targeting of civilian areas at a joint press conference in Goma.

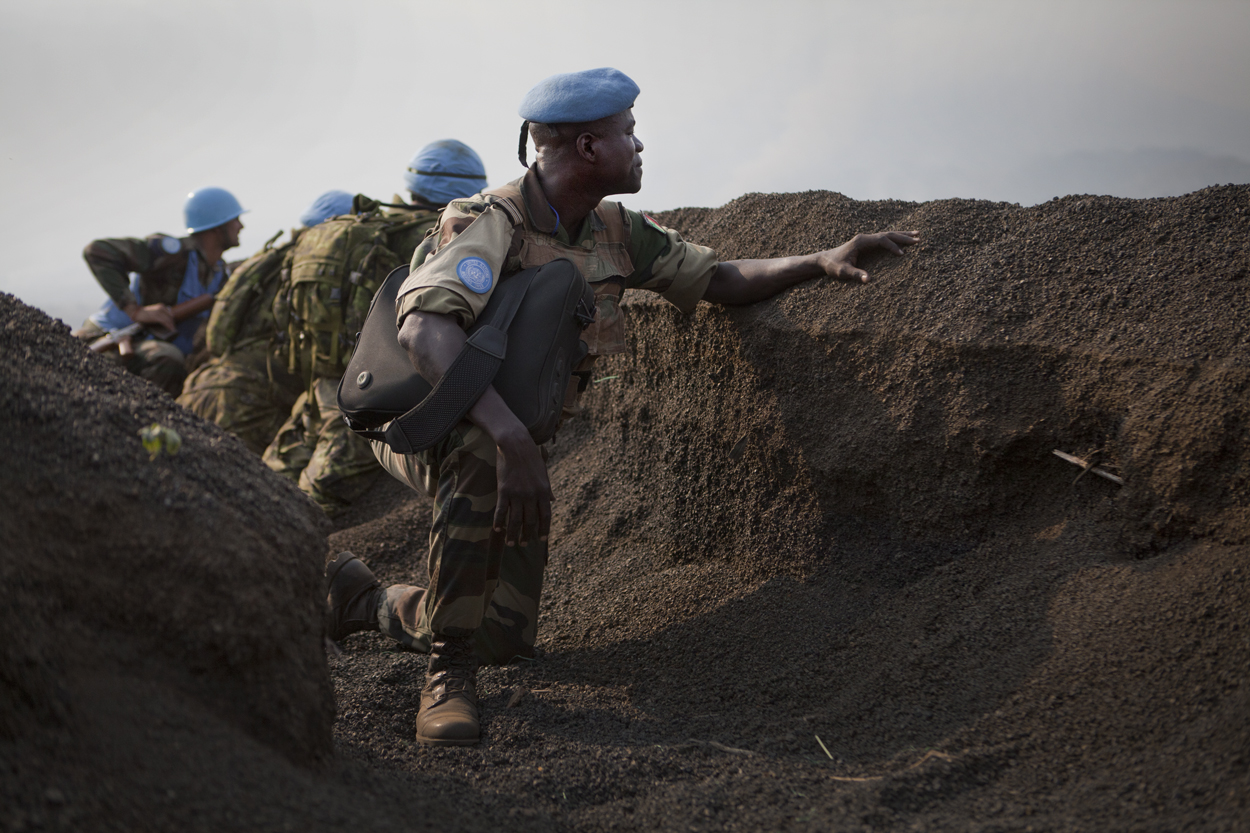
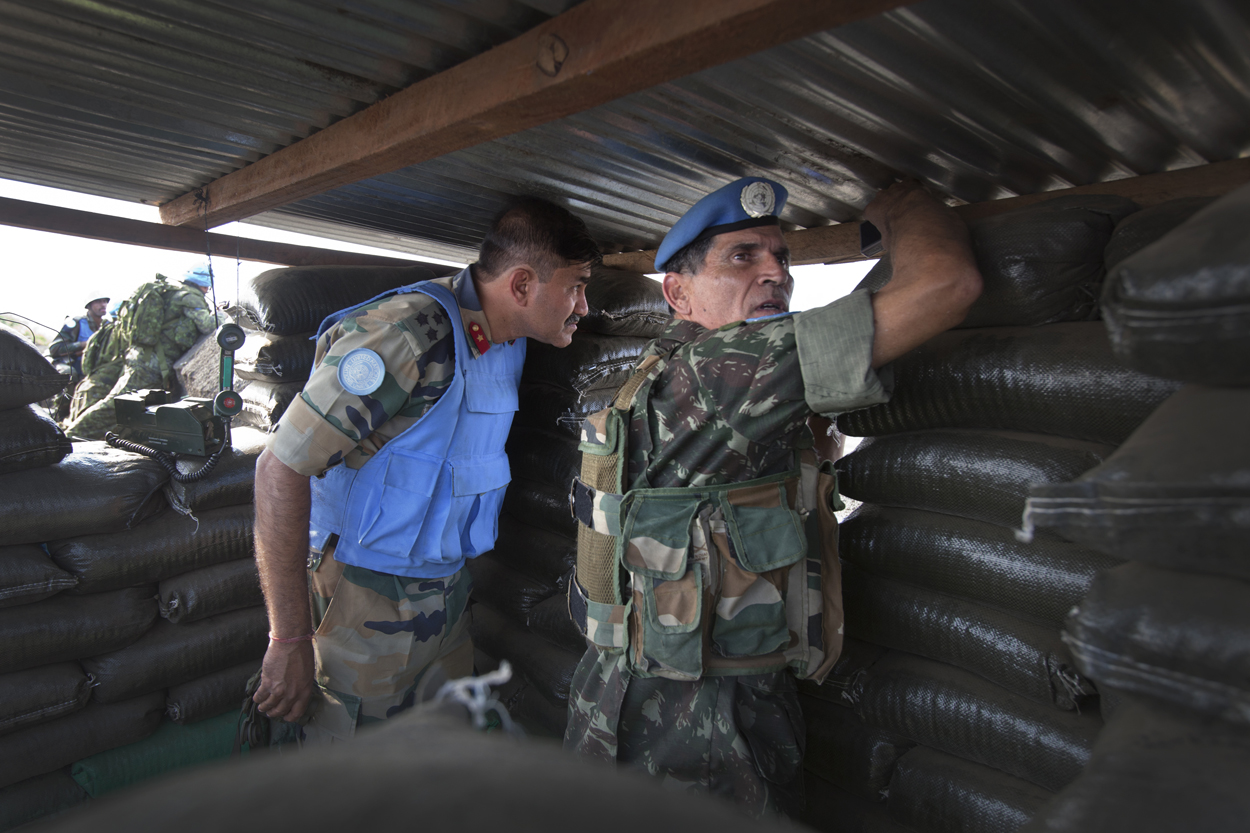
MONUSCO military observers seek cover in trenches on Munigi Hill in Bukumu Chiefdom as FARDC launches an offensive against M23 rebel positions in Kanyaruchinya, near Goma

On 24 August, demonstrations erupted in Goma, with civilians protesting against armed group attacks and calling for increased intervention and protection from MONUSCO. In response to the renewed fighting, President Museveni hosted the ICGLR's seventh summit in Kampala on 5–6 September, attended by Presidents Joseph Kabila, Paul Kagame, Jakaya Kikwete, and Salva Kiir. During closed-door consultations, leaders addressed issues impeding the Kampala dialogue that had triggered the fighting, including cessation of hostilities, amnesty, integration, disarmament of M23, and the fate of its leadership. The UN Special Envoy participated in these discussions, advocating for a principled stance against amnesty and integration for those guilty of serious crimes. Additionally, Presidents Kagame and Kikwete held bilateral meetings to address rising tensions between their countries regarding the situation in eastern DRC. The summit denounced bombings in Goma and Rwanda, tasked the Expanded Joint Verification Mechanism with investigating the incidents, and directed the parties involved in the Kampala dialogue to recommence discussions within three days and conclude them within fourteen days. It urged M23 to cease military activities, decided to exert pressure on M23 and other negative forces in eastern DRC, accepted MONUSCO's request for permanent representation within the Mechanism, and solicited logistical support from MONUSCO. Furthermore, it called on the UN to find urgent solutions for former M23 combatants in Rwanda and accepted a joint SADC/ICGLR summit proposal.

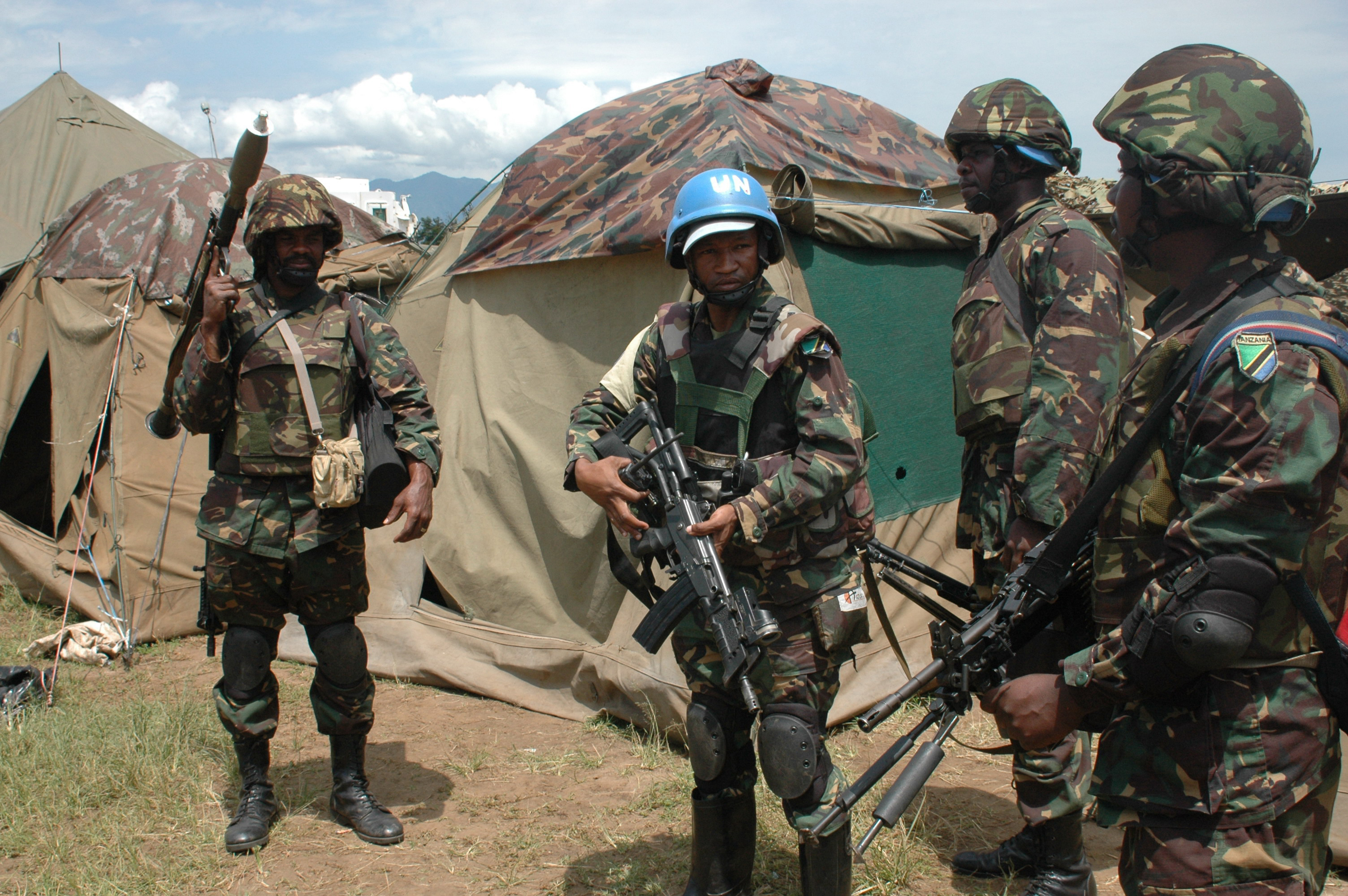
Tanzanian soldiers of the UN brigade

On 5 November, in Kampala, Uganda, M23 publicly renounced its rebel activities and urged combatants to prepare for the process of disarmament, demobilization, and social reintegration. The following day, the Congolese government acknowledged this renunciation and simultaneously launched military operations against M23 positions in eastern DRC. On 7 November, Makenga surrendered, along with approximately 1,500 fighters, at Mgahinga Gorilla National Park, after which they were relocated to refugee camps in Uganda. where he and his troops surrendered to the Ugandan authorities and were held in a demobilization camp.

On 2 December, a summit between Kabila and Museveni resulted in a communiqué advocating for the resolution of the Kampala dialogue to facilitate the reintegration of M23 ex-combatants and to complete the demobilization process. By 12 December, the Congolese government and M23 formalized agreements reflecting the conclusions of the Kampala dialogue, addressing the cessation of armed activities and outlining conditions for long-term stability in eastern DRC. Eleven key components of these agreements included amnesty provisions granted to M23 members solely for actions conducted during warfare and insurgency, and the establishment of transitional security arrangements aimed at facilitating disarmament and demobilization. The signatories also agreed on the release of M23 members incarcerated by the Congolese government for acts of rebellion. Furthermore, M23 committed to ending its insurgency and transitioning into a recognized political party, alongside the demobilization of former combatants. The agreements encompassed measures for the return of refugees and IDPs to their homes, the formation of a commission to address issues related to confiscated, extorted, stolen, or destroyed properties, and initiatives directed toward national reconciliation and justice. Additional provisions included social, security, and economic reforms, as well as the implementation of findings from the review of the 23 March 2009 Agreement. Lastly, the parties established mechanisms for monitoring and evaluating the agreed positions. Despite these advancements, issues surrounding legal accountability for the rebellion remained contentious due to international pressure.

==== Humanitarian crisis and refugee displacement (2012–2013) ====
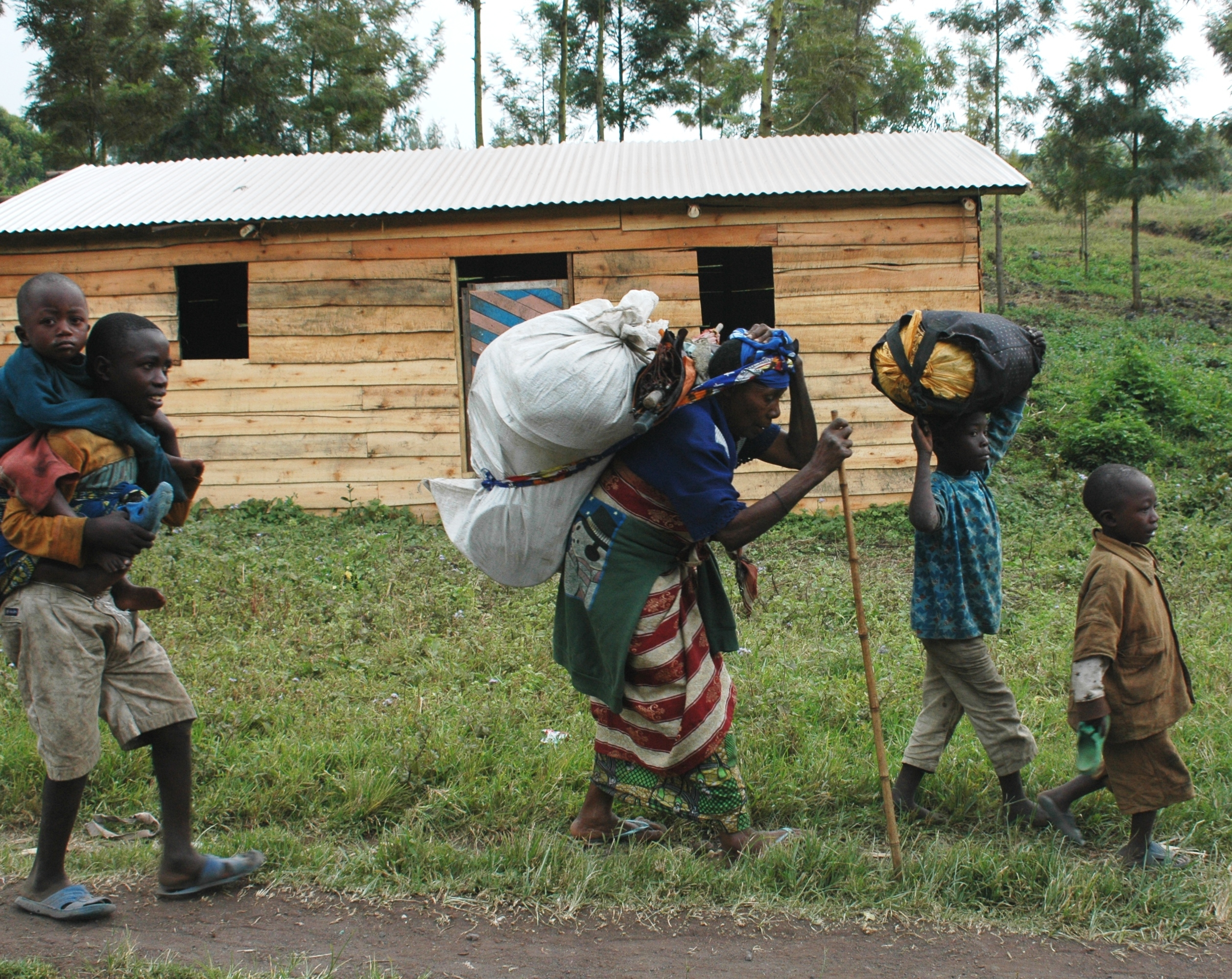
Residents of Mutaho seeking refuge in Goma on 21 May 2013, following two days of intense fighting between M23 rebels and FARDC soldiers

The humanitarian situation remained dire due to ongoing clashes between FARDC and various armed groups. As of late August, tens of thousands were newly displaced, with North and South Kivu provinces accounting for approximately 65% of the 2.6 million internally displaced persons (IDPs) in the DRC. By 25 August, over 1 million IDPs were reported in North Kivu, while South Kivu had an estimated 712,000 IDPs as of 31 July. The conflict also had profound regional implications, leading to significant refugee flows, with approximately 440,000 Congolese refugees residing in neighboring countries. In July 2013, Uganda experienced a notable influx of over 66,000 Congolese refugees, primarily due to intense clashes in Beni Territory. Uganda emerged as the largest host for Congolese refugees, accommodating around 150,000 individuals. Other neighboring nations, including Burundi, Rwanda, Tanzania, Republic of the Congo, South Sudan, Zambia, Central African Republic, and Angola, also received varying numbers of Congolese refugees.

=== Resurgence of insurgency (2017-2022) ===
On November 7, 2013, M23 commander Sultani Makenga decided to retreat with hundreds of M23 fighters to Mgahinga National Park in Uganda In 2015, Bertrand Bisimwa emerged as one of the leaders of the new rebel group called M27, which is composed of members of the National Congress for the Defence of the People (CNDP) and M23 defectors.

In 2017, M23 commander Sultani Makenga and about 100 to 200 of his followers fled from Uganda to resume their insurgency, setting up camp at Mount Mikeno in the border area between Rwanda, Uganda, and the DR Congo. However, this splinter group remained largely inactive and did not receive support from the broader M23. On 7 November 2021, M23 launched attacks on the FARDC in the villages of Ndiza, Cyanzu, and Runyoni, killing four people. These attacks were seen as a response to stalled negotiations with the Congolese government, which had failed to progress.

Later research organized by the United Nations Security Council suggested that Makenga's return to an insurgency had started a gradual rearmament and restoration of M23, with Bisimwa's "Revolutionary Army of Congo" joining these efforts in late 2021 by reorganizing its remaining fighters and recruiting new ones in cooperation with Makenga. The headquarters of the restored M23 is believed to be located at Mount Sabyinyo.

=== Second M23 conflict (2022–present) ===
==== Offensive in Rutshuru and territorial gains ====
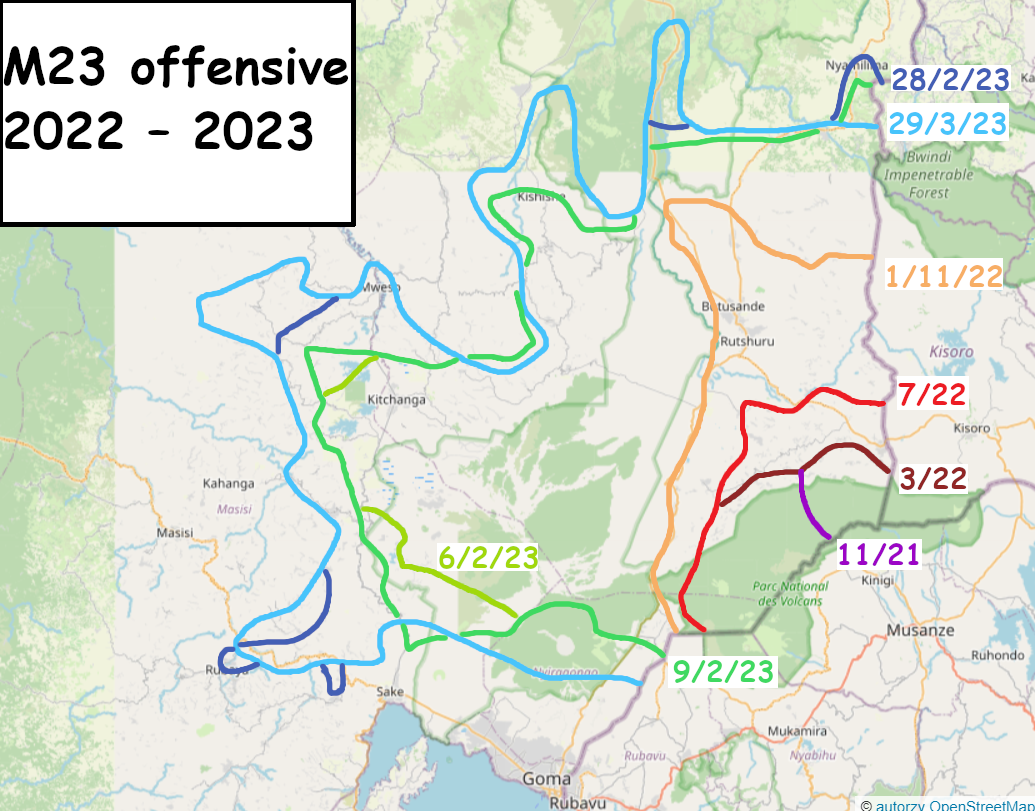
A map of the M23 offensive

The conflict escalated in 2022 with a major battle in Bunagana, a strategic border town, on 28 March. M23 deployed approximately 400 fighters in the assault. The following day, a MONUSCO helicopter was downed over M23-controlled territory, leading to the deaths of eight peacekeepers. The rebels also disrupted Ugandan road construction efforts in the region, prompting the Uganda People's Defence Force (UPDF) to intervene briefly to secure equipment and personnel. This offensive led the Congolese government to publicly accuse Rwanda of supporting M23 for the first time. Amid mounting tensions, regional heads of state, including Presidents Félix Tshisekedi, Paul Kagame, Yoweri Museveni, and Uhuru Kenyatta, met in Nairobi on 8 April 2022 to explore diplomatic solutions. An agreement was reached for a dual-track approach: peace talks with armed groups alongside military operations to force insurgents to demobilize. However, the Congolese government hesitated to negotiate directly with M23 and later rebranded the talks as "consultations", expanding participation to around 40 other armed groups. Fighting resumed on 23 April, and the Congolese delegation used the renewed hostilities as grounds to withdraw from discussions. Following this, President Tshisekedi reassigned the M23 negotiations from Claude Ibalanky, who had initiated dialogue, to Serge Tshibangu, a close advisor advocating for a more hardline stance.

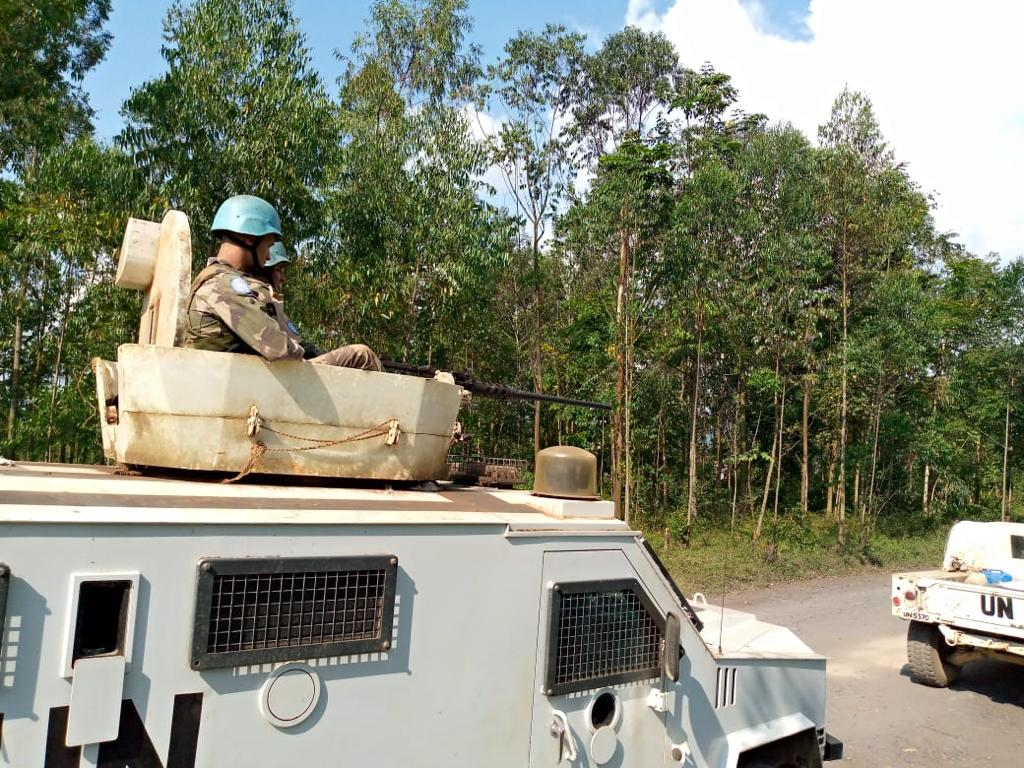
Moroccan MONUSCO peacekeepers on a long-range patrol to protect civilians from M23 rebels in Rutshuru Territory

On 9 May, various armed factions—including the Alliance des Patriotes pour un Congo Libre et Souverain (APCLS), the Coalition des Mouvements pour le Changement/Forces de Défense du Peuple (CMC/FDP), the Nduma Défense du Congo-Rénové (NDC-R), and the Alliance Nationale des Congolais pour la Défense des Droits de l'Homme (ANCDH)—signed an agreement in Pinga, Walikale Territory, pledging to halt hostilities among themselves and align with the Congolese army. The meeting was attended by FARDC Colonel Salomon Tokolonga and representatives of FDLR. Although President Tshisekedi condemned this strategy on 12 May, stating, "you can't put out a fire by throwing oil on it", no punitive actions were taken against those involved. Following the breakdown of peace talks, M23 intensified its military campaign under the leadership of Bertrand Bisimwa. On 26 May, the group overran a major FARDC base at Rumangabo, marking its most significant assault since resuming operations. By 13 June, M23 had captured Bunagana. Despite increased military efforts, the Congolese government remained committed to a diplomatic resolution. Discussions in Nairobi led to the establishment of the East African Community Regional Force (EACRF), marking the first military intervention by the East African Community (EAC), which had historically focused on economic integration. On 28 May, the Congolese government officially labeled M23 a "terrorist" organization, signaling its unwillingness to negotiate with the group. Meanwhile, faced with growing military pressure from M23 and the RDF, the FARDC sought alliances with local militias. On 19 June, the EAC chiefs of staff formulated an operational strategy, assigning military responsibilities to member states. Burundi and Tanzania were designated to operate in South Kivu and Maniema (though Tanzania did not confirm participation), Kenya was tasked with securing the southern part of North Kivu, Uganda was assigned the northern part of North Kivu and Ituri, and South Sudan was given responsibility for the Uélé Province. Rwanda was initially expected to deploy troops in North and South Kivu, but the DRC rejected its participation. Regional stakeholders advocated for renewed diplomatic engagement, contending that the prevailing military stalemate necessitated a political resolution. The Congolese government, however, viewed the situation as the result of Rwandan aggression and maintained that there would be "no negotiation with M23" unless the group withdrew to its initial positions on the slopes of Mount Sabyinyo.

On 20 October, M23 launched a renewed offensive in Rutshuru Territory. The FARDC's counteroffensive quickly faltered, allowing M23 to expand its territorial control significantly. By 29 October, the rebels had captured the towns of Rutshuru and Kiwanja, securing a section of Route Nationale 2 and cutting off the primary supply route between Goma and the northern cities of Beni and Butembo. This development increased Goma's reliance on trade with Rwanda. M23 forces then advanced along three fronts: southward toward Goma, halting approximately 20 kilometers from the city; northward toward the Ishasha border post; and westward through Virunga National Park, toward Tongo groupement of Bwito Chiefdom. According to an investigative report by the Congo Research Group (CRG), M23's territorial expansion was bolstered by external support. Ugandan authorities reportedly allowed M23 to use their territory for recruitment and medical treatment of wounded fighters. Drone surveillance from the battle in Rugari on 30 October revealed the presence of soldiers equipped with gear resembling that of RDF. On 24 October, an RDF soldier defected to the MONUSCO base in Kiwanja.

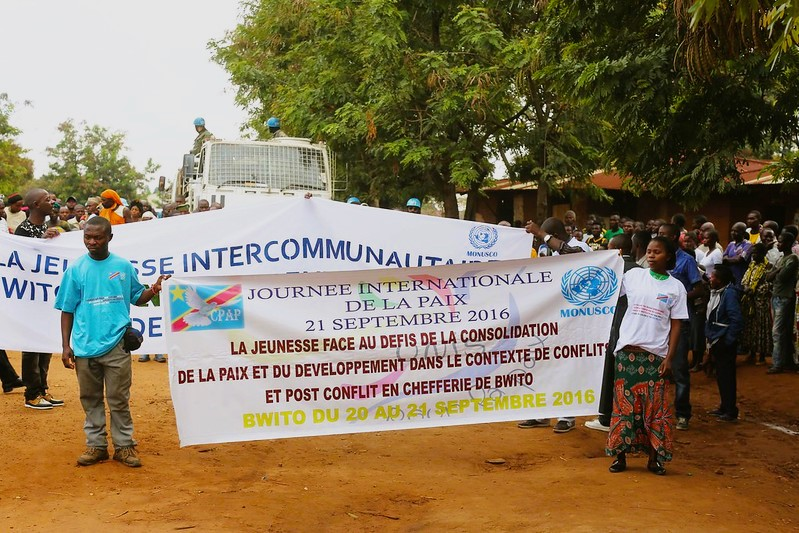
Civilians marching in Kibirizi village, Mutanda groupement, in the Bwito Chiefdom, September 2016

On 29 October, the Congolese government expelled Rwanda's ambassador to Kinshasa, citing Rwanda's alleged complicity in supporting M23. In retaliation, President Félix Tshisekedi exhorted Congolese youth to enlist in the FARDC. On 7 November, the FARDC, in collaboration with the private military enterprise Agemira, mobilized two Su-25 fighter jets to execute aerial bombardments on M23 strongholds. This escalation heightened tensions with Rwanda, which accused the DRC of violating its airspace. On the ensuing day, the Congolese National Assembly ratified a resolution proscribing any negotiations that would facilitate the reintegration of armed factions into the national security apparatus. Kenyan contingent of the EACRF commenced troop deployments in Goma on 12 November to curb M23's territorial incursions. However, with a limited force size—reportedly capped at 900 soldiers—its deterrence capabilities were perceived as insufficient. Meanwhile, local militia groups launched counter-attacks against M23 in Rushovu on 14 November and in Kanaba on 17 November, resulting in significant insurgent casualties. In retaliation, M23 carried out the Kishishe massacre between 21–30 November, killing over 300 civilians across the Bwito Chiefdom, encompassing the villages of Kishishe, Bambu, and adjacent localities. This atrocity provoked an intensified wave of international censure and galvanized renewed diplomatic and military initiatives from Kinshasa.

==== Continued clashes ====
A regional summit held in Luanda, Angola on 23 November yielded a more resolute posture than preceding diplomatic overtures. The summit mandated M23's immediate withdrawal to its initial positions, ostensibly on Mount Sabyinyo, and forewarned that the East African heads of state would sanction military intervention should the group fail to acquiesce. However, Kenya, whose military would likely lead any offensive, was absent from the meeting. On 25 November, M23 acquiesced to a ceasefire. On 23 December, M23 announced the partial handover of its positions in Kibumba to the Kenyan contingent of EACRF. Subsequent reports from the Expanded Joint Verification Mechanism (MCVE) and EACRF revealed that the group retained a presence in the area.

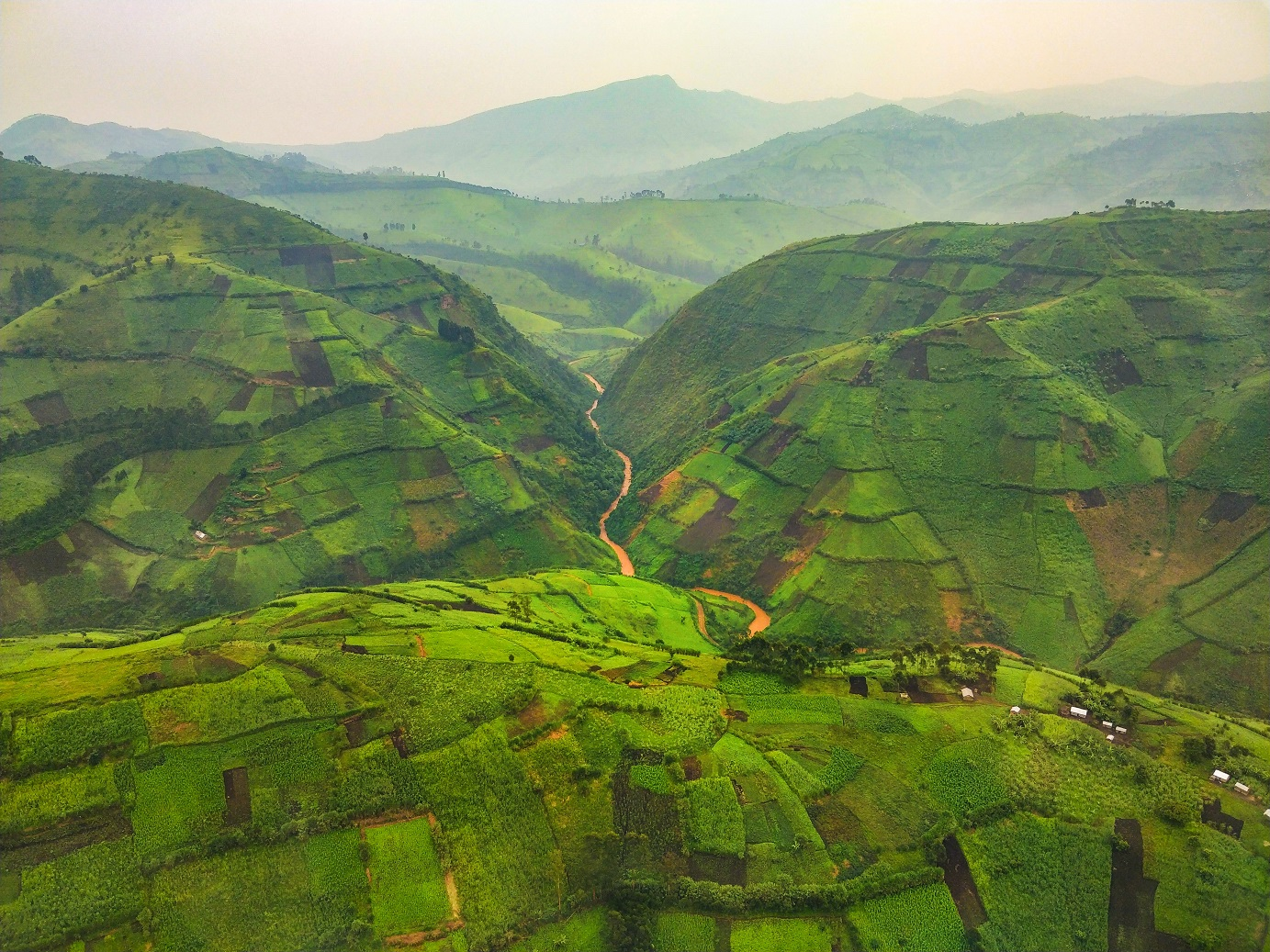
The landscape of Masisi Territory, a region that has a history of repeated occupation by M23

On 24 January 2023, a Congolese fighter jet was hit by Rwandan artillery fire. Meanwhile, M23 continued its territorial expansion, capturing the strategically significant town of Kitchanga on 26 January 2023. Days later, on 30 January, the Congolese army expelled Rwandan officers from EACRF, a move that drew criticism from the EAC secretary general for allegedly violating the Status of Forces Agreement. The Nairobi-led peace process weakened, prompting an EAC summit in Bujumbura on 4 February. While the summit declaration emphasized a regional approach and the need for political dialogue, the Congolese government rejected this stance, arguing that the EACRF should adopt an offensive mandate.

On 9 February, the EAC Chiefs of Staff convened in Nairobi and recommended restructuring the EACRF to include contingents from all participating nations. The first Burundian troops arrived on 4 March, deploying along the western flank of M23-controlled areas, followed by Ugandan troops entering through the Bunagana border on 31 March, and South Sudanese forces arriving in Rumangabo on 8 April. The EACRF's deployment temporarily stabilized front lines, with minimal territorial shifts between April and October 2023. On 13 March, M23 withdrew from select positions, such as those in Mweso, but failed to return to its original stronghold at Mount Sabyinyo. In various deployment zones, M23 maintained control and administrative functions despite the presence of regional forces.

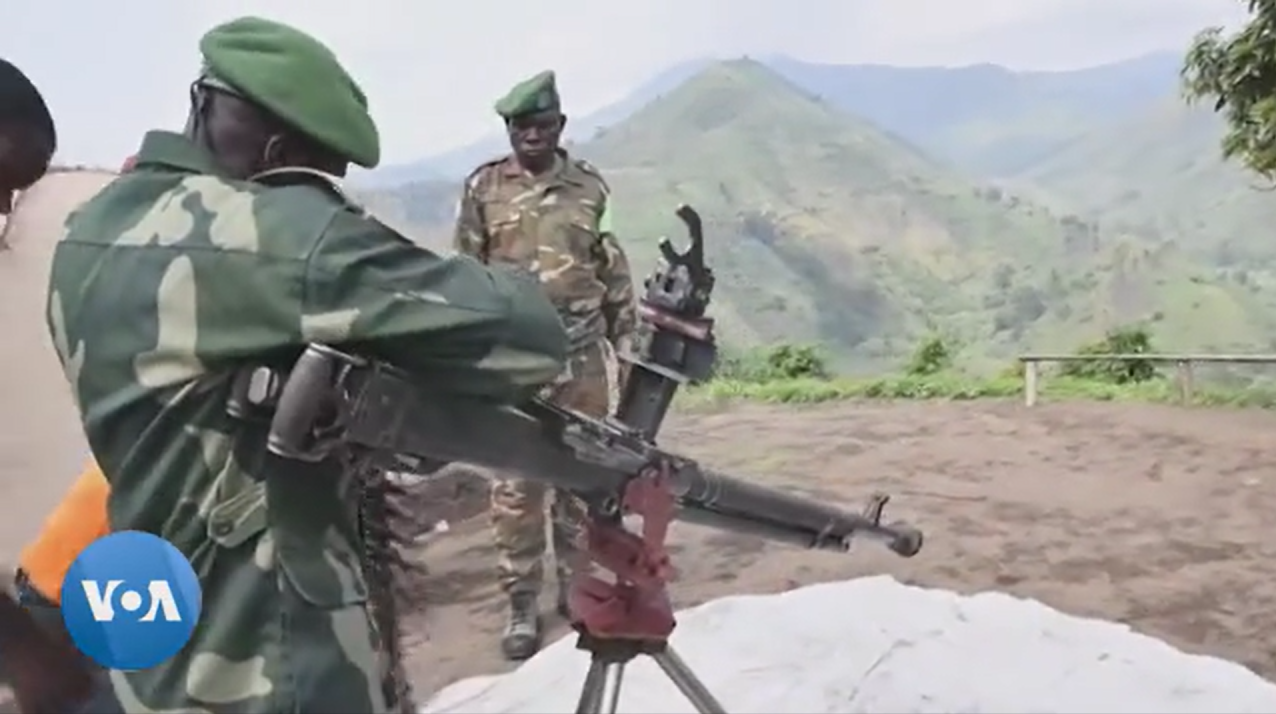
Wazalendo fighters in Kitchanga following the Second Battle of Kitshanga

Exasperated by the perceived inaction of the EACRF, the Congolese government sought assistance from the Southern African Development Community (SADC). On 8 May, SADC approved the deployment of a military force to support the DRC's efforts to restore stability in eastern Congo. Meanwhile, the Congolese government intensified its collaboration with local militias. On 6 March, Minister of Higher Education Butondo Muhindo Nzangi announced that local armed groups would be incorporated as reservists within the FARDC. On 4 May, the Congolese parliament passed a law formally establishing a reserve corps, fostering the creation of numerous militias under the banner of wazalendo ("patriots" in Swahili). These militias were concentrated near M23-controlled areas, though some emerged in other conflict zones such as Beni Territory and Lubero Territory. Simultaneously, private military companies increased their presence, with approximately 900 personnel operating in North Kivu by late May 2023. These forces also engaged in training Congolese soldiers at the Mubambiro military base near Goma. The United States condemned the presence of RDF troops in the DRC and, in August 2023, imposed sanctions on Rwandan General Andrew Nyamvumba for his alleged role in supporting M23.

In early 2024, diplomatic efforts led by Angola sought to revive peace talks between the DRC and Rwanda. After the two presidents failed to meet in Addis Ababa during an African Union summit in February, Angola facilitated separate meetings with each leader. A ministerial meeting was subsequently held in Luanda in March to lay the groundwork for a summit. Under pressure from international donors, particularly the United States, the DRC committed to developing a plan to neutralize FDLR. Rwanda indicated that it would reassess its defensive measures upon the plan's implementation. As part of broader diplomatic efforts, discussions between the Congolese and Rwandan governments took place in Geneva on 15 May under the auspices of the United Nations High Commissioner for Refugees (UNHCR). Both parties agreed to pursue constructive dialogue to facilitate the return of refugees residing in Rwanda and Uganda, addressing one of M23's longstanding demands. Progress on this front has since stagnated. Despite regional mediation efforts and the involvement of multiple international actors, the conflict remains unresolved. M23 continues to exert significant influence in eastern DRC, while tensions between Kinshasa and Kigali persist.

The SADC deployed the SAMIDRC, made up of Tanzanian, Malawian, and South African contingents. Although the FARDC and allied forces managed to retain control of Sake, the M23-RDF coalition occupied key positions on the surrounding hills and the town of Sasha, thereby controlling crucial supply routes linking Sake and Goma to the rest of the DRC. In March 2024, M23 launched a northern push into Rutshuru Territory, capturing Rwindi and the Vitshumbi fishery along Lake Edward with little resistance. The FARDC withdrew to Kanyabayonga before the rebels' arrival. Following these setbacks, General Chico Tshitambwe, commander of the northern front, was recalled to Kinshasa along with other officers accused of abandoning their posts. In response to perceived acts of treason on the battlefield, the Congolese Minister of Justice announced the suspension of the moratorium on the death penalty. According to an April 2024 report by the United Nations Group of Experts on the DRC, between 3,000 and 4,000 RDF soldiers were present on Congolese territory, possibly outnumbering the estimated 3,000 M23 combatants.

In January 2025 a Portuguese Comboni missionary stationed in the DRC spoke to Catholic Charity Aid to the Church in Need, blaming M23 for a series of attacks on civilians around Christmas of 2024. He accused Rwanda directly of instigating the violence. "Christmas is normally the period of tranquillity, peace, joy and fraternity, of family, but for these people it was a very difficult time, a time of anguish, of not knowing where to stay, of being on the run, of being scared because of the lack of political will to change the situation. The problem does not lie with the people, but with Rwanda, which continues to want to massacre the Congolese population, to take control of the land and steal the rich natural resources."

Strategic advances and mineral exploitation in Rubaya

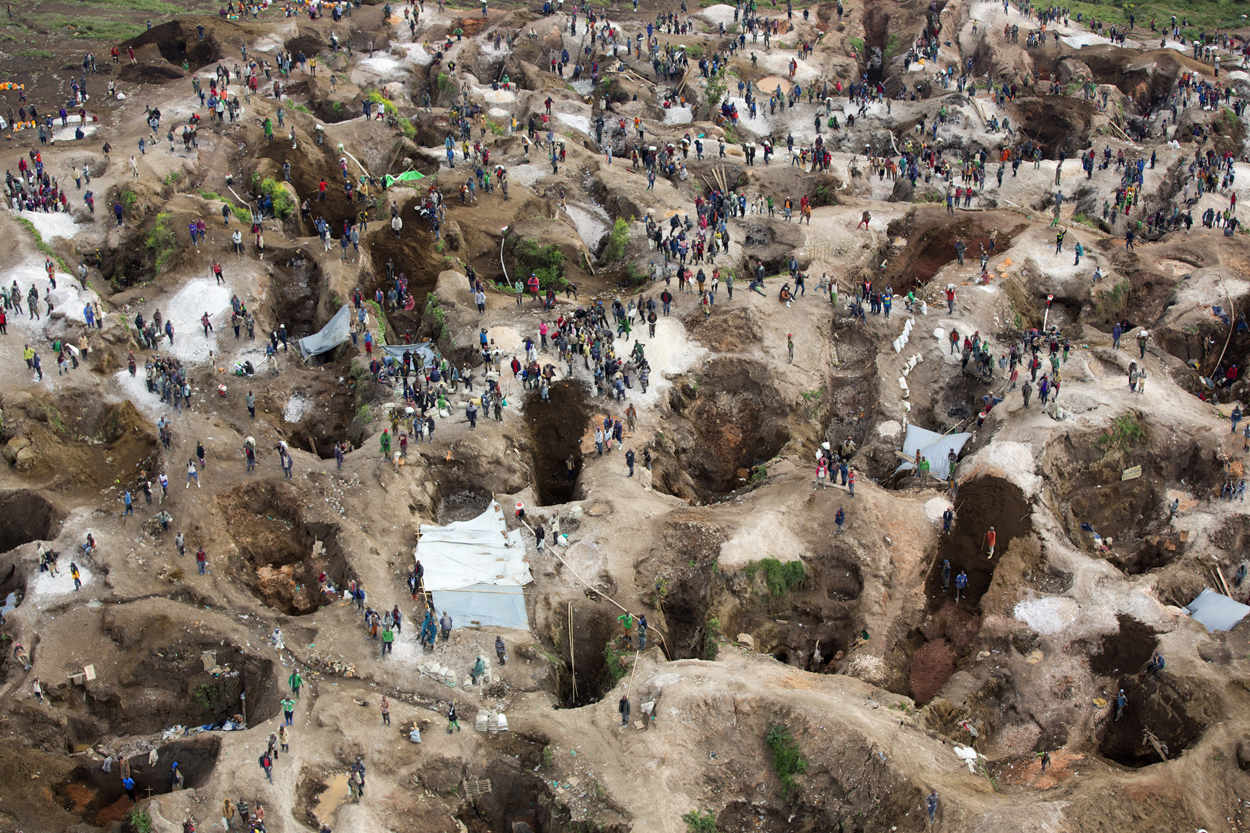
The Bibatama Mining Concession, the largest coltan mine in the African Great Lakes region and a major contributor to the country's mining economy, accounting for 15% of global coltan production, came under M23 control in April 2024.

M23 and RDF forces continued their advance on the southern front in Petit Nord, capturing mining sites in southern Masisi Territory, including Rubaya—one of the largest sources of coltan globally—on 30 April. The alliance, referred to as AFC-M23, (Note: AFC is an acronym of Alliance Fleuve Congo) established control over trading centers in Rubaya and Mushaki, as well as critical mineral transport routes to Rwanda. This arrangement led to one of the most significant contaminations of supply chains with ineligible 3T minerals—tin, tantalum, and tungsten—recorded in the African Great Lakes region in the past decade.

AFC-M23 monopolized the export of coltan from Rubaya to Rwanda, emphasizing high-volume trade and instituting considerable taxation policies. The group organized all logistical aspects of mineral production, trade, and transport, effectively establishing a quasi-governmental administration. This included the establishment of a ministry for mineral exploitation in Rubaya's trading area, which issued permits for miners and traders, disguised with the markings of the "République Démocratique du Congo – Province du Nord Kivu". Miners and traders were mandated to pay annual fees, and AFC-M23 doubled the wages of miners to incentivize their continued labor. The armed group enforced transaction regulations, threatening punitive actions for any violations.

Minerals extracted from Rubaya were transported through various routes within the DRC, notably via Bihambwe, Mushaki, Kirolirwe, Kitshanga, Kizimba, Bishusha, Mulimbi, Tongo, Kalengera, and Kibumba. Cargo offloaded at the Kibumba market was often transported in heavy-duty trucks entering the DRC from Rwanda. Satellite imagery confirmed these movements. AFC-M23 enforced forced labor (salongo) among locals to construct and widen roads necessary for the transportation of minerals. Reports indicated that mineral convoys operated regularly, with several tons of coltan shipped each week, totaling an estimated 120 tons per month. AFC-M23 levied taxes and in-kind payments on mineral sales and transportation, generating approximately $800,000 monthly from the taxation of coltan production and trade in Rubaya.

==== Territorial expansion and advanced military equipment ====
On 3 May 2024, 122 mm rockets—considered unguided area weapons and indiscriminate when deployed in populated locales—were launched from military positions occupied by RDF units near Karuba in Masisi Territory. These munitions targeted military positions situated along the densely populated Sake-Goma corridor, resulting in civilian casualties in Internally Displaced Persons (IDP) settlements in the area. The humanitarian situation further deteriorated in June 2024, as M23 and RDF forces progressed northward, seizing Kanyabayonga and Kirumba and historically entering Lubero Territory for the first time.

On 10 and 15 June 2024, M23 and RDF employed Spike extended-range guided missiles to strike the SADC Mission in Mubambiro and a FARDC position in Kanyamahoro, respectively. This type of missile, characterized by dual guidance systems (laser and wire-guided), had not previously been documented within the DRC and is not part of the FARDC's arsenal. A two-week humanitarian truce was agreed upon by the DRC and Rwanda on 4 July 2024, mediated by the United States. This agreement called for a cessation of hostilities, the voluntary return of displaced populations, and unrestricted access for humanitarian aid. In contrast to previous ceasefires in November and December 2023, this truce did not require RDF withdrawal.

The truce was extended by a ceasefire agreement beginning on 4 August 2024, facilitated by Angola and the African Union. Although initially honored by both RDF and FARDC, the ceasefire soon saw a resumption of conflict involving proxy forces such as M23 and Wazalendo alongside the FDLR. During a period of relative calm, these factions reportedly used the opportunity to reinforce their ranks and replenish arms supplies. By early August, both M23 and RDF made substantial territorial gains in northeastern Rutshuru Territory, capturing several key localities along the Kiwanja-Ishasha route, including the Ishasha border post with Uganda.

From late May to early August 2024, electronic warfare tactics, including spoofing and jamming, disrupted Global Positioning System (GPS) capabilities affecting various aircraft, including U.N., humanitarian, and commercial flights. Jamming systems were identified in areas under the control of M23 and RDF, significantly impacting aerial operations. Despite the ceasefire, hostilities resumed on 20 October 2024 when M23 briefly occupied Kalembe in Walikale Territory before being repelled by Wazalendo and the Nduma Defense of Congo-Renovated. On 25 October, a short-range air defense system operated by RDF was reported in Karuba, Masisi Territory, enhancing the tactical capabilities of M23 and RDF. Following a MONUSCO drone incident, which crashed due to GPS jamming in an active combat zone, the environment remained fraught with tension and sporadic conflict.

==== Influence in Ituri and gold mining ====
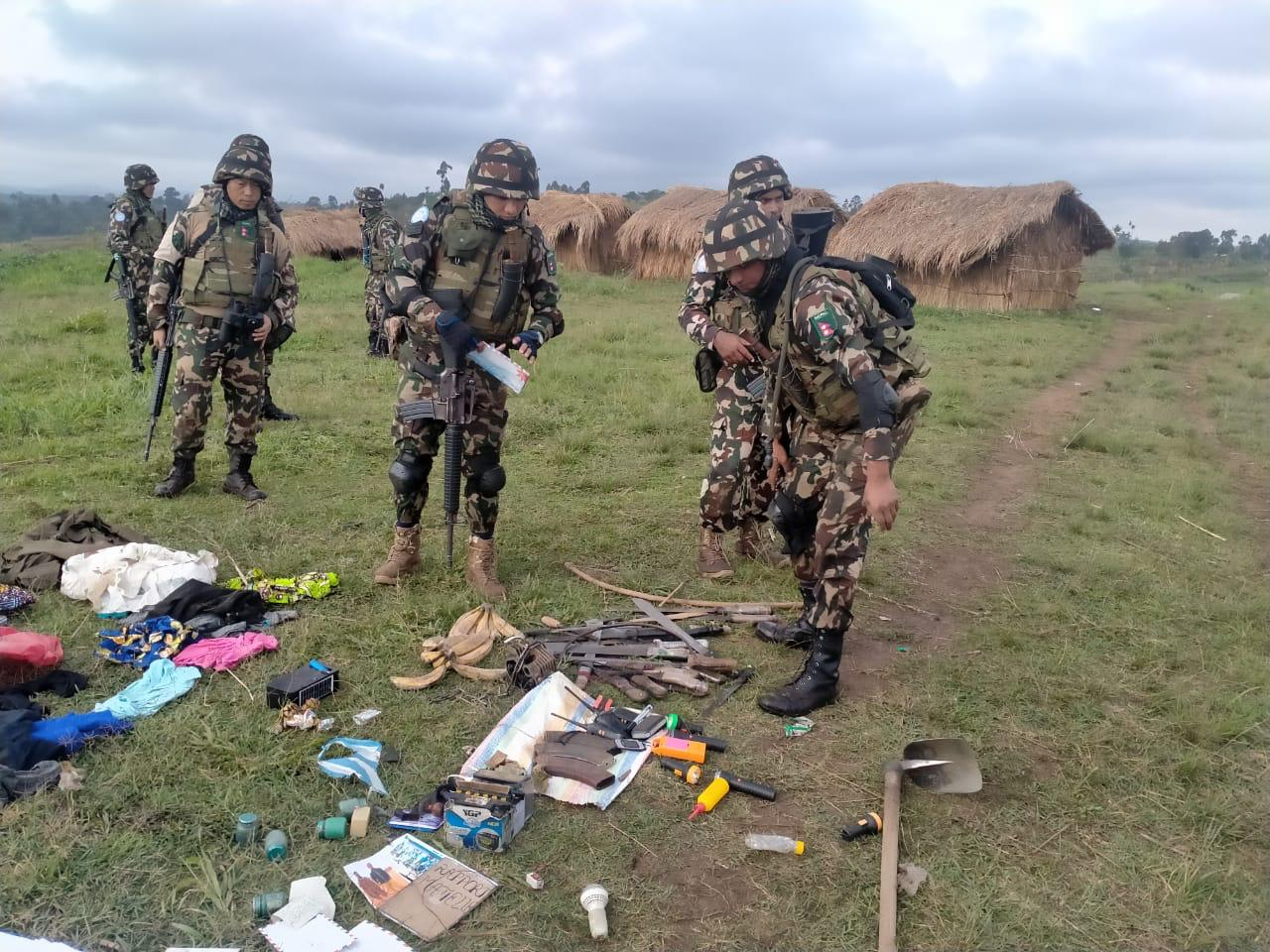
Nepalese peacekeepers conduct a search. To safeguard the safety of the local population and protect their property, MONUSCO initiated a large-scale operation on 5 April 2022, targeting armed groups operating in the Bali region, located over 100 km from Bunia in Djugu Territory

In Ituri Province, a local faction previously known as Zaïre rebranded itself as the Auto-Défense des Communautés Victimes de l'Ituri (ADCVI). During May and June 2024, ADCVI increased its recruitment efforts, successfully training thousands of new combatants. This group acquired military hardware, including armed pick-up trucks and boats, which enhanced its operational capacities on Lake Albert.

ADCVI developed capabilities for aerial surveillance through the deployment of small commercial drones. Although ADCVI continued to present itself as a self-defense organization, it engaged in provocative actions against rival groups, such as the Coopérative pour le Développement du Congo/Union des Révolutionnaires pour la Défense du Peuple Congolais (CODECO/URDPC), while also increasingly targeting FARDC and the Congolese National Police.

ADCVI launched extensive recruitment drives across various "G5" communities in the Djugu, Mahagi, and Aru territories, utilizing experienced former leaders and combatants from the Union des Patriotes Congolais (UPC). Recruitment also occurred in internally displaced persons camps throughout Ituri. Thousands of combatants received military training at facilities in Ituri, including AFC-M23 training centers located in Tchanzu, as well as in Uganda.

ADCVI reinforced its alliance with the AFC-M23 in preparation for planned offensive operations against FARDC in Ituri. This coalition aimed to establish a comprehensive strategy to coordinate troop movements, logistical support routes for weaponry, and operational bases to facilitate a large-scale assault. AFC-M23 expressed its intention to unite all armed groups in Ituri under its leadership. Notably, negotiations were reported in December 2024, indicating interest from the Force de Résistance Patriotique de l'Ituri (FRPI) and CODECO-URDPC in aligning with AFC-M23, a potentially transformative development for the region.

Key figures in these dynamics included individuals such as Thomas Lubanga Dyilo and Yves Khawa Panga Mandro, both sanctioned for their involvement in violent activities. They played pivotal roles in enhancing collaboration between AFC-M23 and ADCVI, facilitating recruitment and training efforts, and organizing travel logistics for combatants. Notably, Innocent Kaina, alias India Queen, a prominent M23 commander, coordinated closely with Lubanga in Kampala to support these initiatives.

In late July 2024, strategies were formalized to reconcile and unify various factions, including an attempt to merge MAPI and Zaïre-ADCVI under the AFC-M23 umbrella. Though MAPI leaders opted for independence, they agreed to cooperate with ADCVI and AFC-M23. This broad mobilization effort and collaboration have intensified significantly since August 2024, with frequent meetings taking place in various locations within Uganda, reflecting a strategic consolidation of power among these groups in Ituri.

Ituri remains a significant site for artisanal gold mining, predominantly operating outside of state control, generating an estimated $140 million annually for armed groups and criminal networks. There exists a stark disparity between the estimated production of artisanal and small-scale gold and the recorded statistics. An official report estimated that artisanal and small-scale gold production in Ituri reached approximately 1,800 kilograms per year. However, between January and June 2024, the Service d'assistance et d'encadrement minière artisanale et à petite échelle (SAEMAPE) and the Coopérative des négociants d'or de l'Ituri (COONORI) reported a mere 17 kilograms of gold produced and 24 kilograms purchased, respectively.

Mining authorities attributed this discrepancy largely to limited access to sites under the control of armed factions. Despite mining cooperatives engaging in protective arrangements with the Congolese National Police and FARDC, vast majority of mining locations continued to be dominated by armed groups such as CODECO/URDPC and ADCVI in Djugu Territory, as well as the FRPI and MAPI in Irumu Territory, with CODECO/URDPC also active in Mahagi Territory. Consequently, proprietors of the principal mining cooperatives in Ituri, all shareholders of COONORI, resorted to paying fees to the leaders of the armed factions controlling the mining areas. These leaders include Baraka from ADCVI and an armed figure known as "50 cent" from CODECO, payments viewed as maintaining the viability of their assets and operations. Such payments to armed groups are considered sanctionable acts under international regulations.

One prominent figure within the ADCVI is Baraka, a commander based in the town of Mabanga in Djugu Territory. Baraka has established exclusive control over economic activities within the Mambisa Chiefdom. His operations, including illicit gold mining and the imposition of taxes alongside checkpoint fees, reportedly generated approximately $1.6 million per month solely from gold production. Income accrued from illegal taxes on local commerce and checkpoint fees added an estimated $70,000 to his monthly profits. These funds were often laundered through investments in real estate and commercial enterprises located in Mabanga, Iga-Barrière, and Bunia, thereby enabling Baraka to fortify his status as both an economic and military leader in the region. His activities are consistent with violations of international laws regarding the unlawful exploitation of natural resources, specifically as outlined in United Nations Security Council Resolution 2293.

==== Fall of Goma (January 2025) ====
A map of the M23 offensive, April 2025

On 21 January 2025, it was reported that M23 forces have taken Masisi, the key eastern trading town of Minova, that puts them within 25 mi (40 km) from Goma. Early on 27 January, M23 announced on X that they had captured Goma, although there were still reports of fighting throughout the city. Civilians shared videos showing M23 rebels patrolling Goma's major streets. The rebels issued an ultimatum, demanding the surrender of FARDC forces and imposing a 48-hour deadline, which culminated earlier that day.

Some Congolese soldiers conceded, relinquishing their arms before the deadline expired. Key access routes surrounding Goma were barricaded, rendering Goma International Airport inoperable for evacuation and humanitarian relief efforts. Despite the partial presence of Congolese military personnel within the city, a significant portion of Goma fell under M23's dominion. Reports emerged of heavy artillery shelling within the city center and a mass jailbreak, with unverified footage circulating online showing detainees escaping.

The prison, which housed 3,000 inmates, was reportedly completely torched, with fatalities resulting from the incident. It was reported that hundreds of female inmates were raped and burned alive during the mass jailbreak from Goma's prison. The group took control of Bukavu, the capital of South Kivu, on 16 February 2025.

On June 19, 2025, Rwanda and DRC agreed to a draft peace agreement to end the fighting. On June 27, Congolese Foreign Minister Thérèse Kayikwamba and her Rwandan counterpart, Olivier Nduhungirehe, signed a peace agreement in the presence of US Secretary of State Marco Rubio in Washington D.C.

M23 rebels killed at least 319 civilians, including 48 women and 19 children, in July 2025 in eastern Democratic Republic of Congo (DRC), according to the UN High Commissioner for Human Rights.

== See also ==
- Democratic Republic of the Congo–Rwanda relations
- Economy of Rwanda
- Economy of Democratic Republic of the Congo
