= Kamalabad =

Kamalabad (Persian: كمال اباد) may refer to various places in Iran:

== Alborz province ==
- Bi Sim-e Kamalabad, a village in Chaharbagh County
- Kamalabad, former name of Kamal Shahr, a city in Karaj County
- Kamalabad Rural District, an administrative subdivision of Karaj County

== Ardabil province ==
- Kamalabad, Ardabil, a village in Nir County

== Fars province ==
- Kamalabad, Arsanjan, a village in Arsanjan County
- Kamalabad, Beyza, a village in Beyza County
- Kamalabad, Fasa, a village in Fasa County
- Kamalabad, Firuzabad, a village in Firuzabad County
- Kamalabad, Larestan, a village in Larestan County
- Kamalabad, Sarvestan, a village in Sarvestan County

== Golestan province ==
- Kamalabad, Galikash, a village in Galikash County
- Kamalabad, Gorgan, a village in Gorgan County

== Isfahan province ==
- Kamalabad, Jarqavieh, a village in Jarqavieh County
- Kamalabad, Nain, a village in Nain County

== Kerman province ==
- Kamalabad, Baft, a village in Baft County
- Kamalabad, Bardsir, a village in Bardsir County
- Kamalabad, Rafsanjan, a village in Rafsanjan County

== Kermanshah province ==
- Kamalabad, Kermanshah, a village in Kermanshah County

== Kohgiluyeh and Boyer-Ahmad province ==
- Kamalabad, Kohgiluyeh and Boyer-Ahmad, a village in Landeh County

== Kurdistan province ==
- Kamalabad-e Shahabiyeh, a village in Qorveh County

== Markazi province ==
- Kamalabad-e Bala, a village in Arak County
- Kamalabad-e Pain, a village in Arak County

== North Khorasan province ==
- Kamalabad, North Khorasan, alternate name of Seh Gonbad, North Khorasan, a village in Faruj County

== Qazvin province ==
- Kamalabad, Alborz, a village in Alborz County
- Kamalabad, Qazvin, a village in Qazvin County

== Razavi Khorasan province ==
- Kamalabad, Razavi Khorasan, a village in Golbahar County

== West Azerbaijan province ==
- Kamalabad, West Azerbaijan, a village in Chaypareh County

== Yazd province ==
- Kamalabad, Yazd, a village in Ashkezar County

== See also ==
- Kamelabad (disambiguation)
