= Damdama =

Village in West Azerbaijan province, Iran

Damdama Persian: دامداما
- Village
- Location within Iran
- Coordinates: 38°56′32″N 45°04′30″E
- Country: Iran
- Province: West Azerbaijan
- County: Chaypareh
- District: Hajjilar
- Rural District: Hajjilar-e Shomali

Population (2016)
  - Total: 455
- Time zone: UTC+3:30 (IRST)

Damdama (Persian: دامداما) (Note: Also romanized as Dāmdāmā) is a village in Hajjilar-e Shomali Rural District of Hajjilar District in Chaypareh County, West Azerbaijan province, Iran.

== Demographics ==
=== Population ===
At the time of the 2006 National Census, the village's population was 396 in 68 households, when it was in Hajjilar Rural District (Note: Renamed Hajjilar-e Jonubi Rural District) of the former Chaypareh District in Khoy County. The following census in 2011 counted 434 people in 97 households, by which time the district had been separated from the county in the establishment of Chaypareh County. The rural district was transferred to the new Hajjilar District and renamed Hajjilar-e Jonubi Rural District. Damdama was transferred to Hajjilar-e Shomali Rural District created in the same district. The 2016 census measured the population of the village as 455 people in 108 households.
