= Hajjilar =

Hajjilar or Haji Lar (Persian: حاجيلار) may refer to:

- Mrgastan, Armenia
- Hajjilar, East Azerbaijan, a village in East Azerbaijan Province, Iran
- Hajjilar, West Azerbaijan, a village in West Azerbaijan Province, Iran
- Hajjilar District, in West Azerbaijan Province, Iran
- Hajjilar Rural District, in West Azerbaijan Province, Iran
- Hajjilar-e Jonubi Rural District, in West Azerbaijan Province, Iran
- Hajjilar-e Shomali Rural District, in West Azerbaijan Province, Iran
