= Esmail Kahrizi =

Village in West Azerbaijan province, Iran

Esmail Kahrizi Persian: اسماعيل كهريزي
- Village
- Location within Iran
- Coordinates: 38°57′36″N 45°10′04″E
- Country: Iran
- Province: West Azerbaijan
- County: Chaypareh
- District: Hajjilar
- Rural District: Hajjilar-e Shomali

Population (2016)
  - Total: 228
- Time zone: UTC+3:30 (IRST)

Esmail Kahrizi (Persian: اسماعيل كهريزي) (Note: Also romanized as Esmā‘īl Kahrīzī; also known as Esmā‘īl Kandī) is a village in Hajjilar-e Shomali Rural District of Hajjilar District in Chaypareh County, West Azerbaijan province, Iran.

== Demographics ==
=== Population ===
At the time of the 2006 National Census, the village's population was 181 in 48 households, when it was in Hajjilar Rural District (Note: Renamed Hajjilar-e Jonubi Rural District) of the former Chaypareh District in Khoy County. The following census in 2011 counted 167 people in 48 households, by which time the district had been separated from the county in the establishment of Chaypareh County. The rural district was transferred to the new Hajjilar District and renamed Hajjilar-e Jonubi Rural District. Esmail Kahrizi was transferred to Hajjilar-e Shomali Rural District created in the same district. The 2016 census measured the population of the village as 228 people in 67 households.
