= Kur Bolagh =

Kur Bolagh or Kurbolagh (Persian: كوربلاغ) may refer to:

- Kur Bolagh, Ardabil
- Kur Bolagh, East Azerbaijan
- Kur Bolagh 1, Kermanshah Province
- Kur Bolagh 2, Kermanshah Province
- Kur Bolagh-e Patiabad, Kermanshah Province
- Kur Bolagh, West Azerbaijan

== See also ==
- Kura Bolagh (disambiguation)
