= Taj Khatun, West Azerbaijan =

Village in West Azerbaijan province, Iran

Taj Khatun Persian: تاج خاتون
- Village
- Location within Iran
- Coordinates: 38°56′17″N 45°09′48″E
- Country: Iran
- Province: West Azerbaijan
- County: Chaypareh
- District: Hajjilar
- Rural District: Hajjilar-e Shomali

Population (2016)
  - Total: 231
- Time zone: UTC+3:30 (IRST)

Taj Khatun (Persian: تاج خاتون) (Note: Also romanized as Taj Khatoon and Tāj Khātūn; also known as Tāsh Khātūn) is a village in Hajjilar-e Shomali Rural District of Hajjilar District in Chaypareh County, West Azerbaijan province, Iran.

== Demographics ==
=== Population ===
At the time of the 2006 National Census, the village's population was 382 in 77 households, when it was in Hajjilar Rural District (Note: Renamed Hajjilar-e Jonubi Rural District) of the former Chaypareh District in Khoy County. The following census in 2011 counted 258 people in 71 households, by which time the district had been separated from the county in the establishment of Chaypareh County. The rural district was transferred to the new Hajjilar District and renamed Hajjilar-e Jonubi Rural District. Taj Khatun was transferred to Hajjilar-e Shomali Rural District created in the same district. The 2016 census measured the population of the village as 231 people in 68 households.
