= Shirin Bolagh, Chaypareh =

Village in West Azerbaijan province, Iran

Shirin Bolagh Persian: شيرين بلاغ
- Village
- Location within Iran
- Coordinates: 38°57′16″N 45°06′18″E
- Country: Iran
- Province: West Azerbaijan
- County: Chaypareh
- District: Hajjilar
- Rural District: Hajjilar-e Shomali

Population (2016)
  - Total: 653
- Time zone: UTC+3:30 (IRST)

Shirin Bolagh (Persian: شيرين بلاغ) (Note: Also romanized as Shīrīn Bolāgh) is a village in Hajjilar-e Shomali Rural District of Hajjilar District in Chaypareh County, West Azerbaijan province, Iran.

== Demographics ==
=== Population ===
At the time of the 2006 National Census, the village's population was 591 in 101 households, when it was in Hajjilar Rural District (Note: Renamed Hajjilar-e Jonubi Rural District) of the former Chaypareh District in Khoy County. The following census in 2011 counted 636 people in 133 households, by which time the district had been separated from the county in the establishment of Chaypareh County. The rural district was transferred to the new Hajjilar District and renamed Hajjilar-e Jonubi Rural District. Shirin Bolagh was transferred to Hajjilar-e Shomali Rural District created in the same district. The 2016 census measured the population of the village as 653 people in 148 households. It was the most populous village in its rural district.
