= Mirza Hesam =

Village in West Azerbaijan province, Iran

Mirza Hesam Persian: ميرزاحسام
- Village
- Location within Iran
- Coordinates: 38°58′04″N 45°01′21″E
- Country: Iran
- Province: West Azerbaijan
- County: Chaypareh
- District: Hajjilar
- Rural District: Hajjilar-e Shomali

Population (2016)
  - Total: 105
- Time zone: UTC+3:30 (IRST)

Mirza Hesam (Persian: ميرزاحسام) (Note: Also romanized as Mīrzā Ḩesām; also known as Mīrzā Ḩasan) is a village in Hajjilar-e Shomali Rural District of Hajjilar District in Chaypareh County, West Azerbaijan province, Iran.

== Demographics ==
=== Population ===
At the time of the 2006 National Census, the village's population was 132 in 29 households, when it was in Hajjilar Rural District (Note: Renamed Hajjilar-e Jonubi Rural District) of the former Chaypareh District in Khoy County. The following census in 2011 counted 99 people in 28 households, by which time the district had been separated from the county in the establishment of Chaypareh County. The rural district was transferred to the new Hajjilar District and renamed Hajjilar-e Jonubi Rural District. Mirza Hesam was transferred to Hajjilar-e Shomali Rural District created in the same district. The 2016 census measured the population of the village as 105 people in 34 households.
