= Pir Yadegar =

Village in West Azerbaijan province, Iran

Pir Yadegar Persian: پيريادگار
- Village
- Location within Iran
- Coordinates: 38°56′10″N 45°13′32″E
- Country: Iran
- Province: West Azerbaijan
- County: Chaypareh
- District: Hajjilar
- Rural District: Hajjilar-e Shomali

Population (2016)
  - Total: 183
- Time zone: UTC+3:30 (IRST)

Pir Yadegar (Persian: پيريادگار) (Note: Also romanized as Pīr Yādegār and Pīr Yādgār; also known as Pīr Dāwar and Pirdavār) is a village in Hajjilar-e Shomali Rural District of Hajjilar District in Chaypareh County, West Azerbaijan province, Iran.

== Demographics ==
=== Population ===
At the time of the 2006 National Census, the village's population was 232 in 46 households, when it was in Hajjilar Rural District (Note: Renamed Hajjilar-e Jonubi Rural District) of the former Chaypareh District in Khoy County. The following census in 2011 counted 184 people in 55 households, by which time the district had been separated from the county in the establishment of Chaypareh County. The rural district was transferred to the new Hajjilar District and renamed Hajjilar-e Jonubi Rural District. Pir Yadegar was transferred to Hajjilar-e Shomali Rural District created in the same district. The 2016 census measured the population of the village as 183 people in 58 households.
