= Hoseynabad, Chaypareh =

Village in West Azerbaijan province, Iran

Hoseynabad Persian: حسين اباد
- Village
- Location within Iran
- Coordinates: 38°53′45″N 45°05′15″E
- Country: Iran
- Province: West Azerbaijan
- County: Chaypareh
- District: Hajjilar
- Rural District: Hajjilar-e Shomali

Population (2016)
  - Total: 181
- Time zone: UTC+3:30 (IRST)

Hoseynabad (Persian: حسين اباد) (Note: Also romanized as Ḩoseynābād) is a village in Hajjilar-e Shomali Rural District of Hajjilar District in Chaypareh County, West Azerbaijan province, Iran.

== Demographics ==
=== Population ===
At the time of the 2006 National Census, the village's population was 177 in 35 households, when it was in Hajjilar Rural District (Note: Renamed Hajjilar-e Jonubi Rural District) of the former Chaypareh District in Khoy County. The following census in 2011 counted 170 people in 37 households, by which time the district had been separated from the county in the establishment of Chaypareh County. The rural district was transferred to the new Hajjilar District and renamed Hajjilar-e Jonubi Rural District. Hoseynabad was transferred to Hajjilar-e Shomali Rural District created in the same district. The 2016 census measured the population of the village as 181 people in 44 households.
