= Shur Kahriz =

Shur Kahriz شوركهريز
- Village
- Location within Iran
- Coordinates: 38°52′15″N 45°07′28″E
- Country: Iran
- Province: West Azerbaijan
- County: Chaypareh
- Bakhsh: Hajjilar
- Rural District: Hajjilar-e Shomali

Population (2006)
  - Total: 28
- Time zone: UTC+3:30 (IRST)
  - Summer (DST): UTC+4:30 (IRDT)

Shur Kahriz (Persian: شوركهريز, also Romanized as Shūr Kahrīz) is a village in Hajjilar-e Shomali Rural District, Hajjilar District, Chaypareh County, West Azerbaijan Province, Iran. At the 2006 census, its population was 28, in 6 families.
