= Churs =

Village in West Azerbaijan province, Iran

Churs Persian: چورس
- Village
- Location within Iran
- Coordinates: 38°49′51″N 45°02′07″E
- Country: Iran
- Province: West Azerbaijan
- County: Chaypareh
- District: Central
- Rural District: Churs

Population (2016)
  - Total: 2,081
- Time zone: UTC+3:30 (IRST)

Churs (Persian: چورس) (Note: Armenian: Ճուաշ or Չորս; also romanized as Chowras, Chowrs, and Chūrs; also known as Choras, Chors, and Jūres) is a village in, and the capital of, Churs Rural District in the Central District of Chaypareh County, West Azerbaijan province, Iran.

== History ==
The location of modern-day Churs proved to be extremely pivotal in Armenian history. On 26 May 451 AD, a decisive battle was fought at the location that would be one of the single most important events in Armenian history.

On the Avarayr Plain, at what is modern-day Churs in the West Azerbaijan Province, the Armenian Army under Vardan Mamikonian clashed with Sassanid Persia. Although the Persians were victorious on the battlefield itself, the battle proved to be a major strategic victory for Armenians, as Avarayr paved the way to the Nvarsak Treaty (484 AD), which affirmed Armenia's right to practice Christianity freely.

== Demographics ==
=== Population ===
At the time of the 2006 National Census, the village's population was 2,367 in 636 households, when it was in the former Chaypareh District of Khoy County. The following census in 2011 counted 2,430 people in 733 households, by which time the district had been separated from the county in the establishment of Chaypareh County. The rural district was transferred to the new Central District. The 2016 census measured the population of the village as 2,081 people in 660 households. It was the most populous village in its rural district.
