= Quchash =

Quchash قوچاش
- Village
- Location within Iran
- Coordinates: 38°55′05″N 45°11′43″E
- Country: Iran
- Province: West Azerbaijan
- County: Chaypareh
- Bakhsh: Hajjilar
- Rural District: Hajjilar-e Shomali

Population (2006)
  - Total: 145
- Time zone: UTC+3:30 (IRST)
  - Summer (DST): UTC+4:30 (IRDT)

Quchash (Persian: قوچاش, also Romanized as Qūchāsh) is a village in Hajjilar-e Shomali Rural District, Hajjilar District, Chaypareh County, West Azerbaijan Province, Iran. At the 2006 census, its population was 145, in 27 families.
