= Bala Kahriz =

Bala Kahriz بالاكهريز
- Village
- Location within Iran
- Coordinates: 38°51′01″N 44°55′00″E
- Country: Iran
- Province: West Azerbaijan
- County: Chaypareh
- Bakhsh: Central
- Rural District: Churs

Population (2006)
  - Total: 90
- Time zone: UTC+3:30 (IRST)
  - Summer (DST): UTC+4:30 (IRDT)

Bala Kahriz (Persian: بالاكهريز, also Romanized as Bālā Kahrīz) is a village in Churs Rural District, in the Central District of Chaypareh County, West Azerbaijan Province, Iran. At the 2006 census, its population was 90, in 22 families.
