= Chir Kandi =

Chir Kandi چيركندي
- Village
- Location within Iran
- Coordinates: 38°47′14″N 44°59′33″E
- Country: Iran
- Province: West Azerbaijan
- County: Chaypareh
- Bakhsh: Central
- Rural District: Churs

Population (2006)
  - Total: 187
- Time zone: UTC+3:30 (IRST)
  - Summer (DST): UTC+4:30 (IRDT)

Chir Kandi (Persian: چيركندي, also Romanized as Chīr Kandī) is a village in Churs Rural District, in the Central District of Chaypareh County, West Azerbaijan Province, Iran. At the 2006 census, its population was 187, in 46 families.
