= Taherabad, Chaypareh =

Taherabad طاهراباد
- Village
- Location within Iran
- Coordinates: 38°49′53″N 45°08′39″E
- Country: Iran
- Province: West Azerbaijan
- County: Chaypareh
- Bakhsh: Hajjilar
- Rural District: Hajjilar-e Jonubi

Population (2006)
  - Total: 226
- Time zone: UTC+3:30 (IRST)
  - Summer (DST): UTC+4:30 (IRDT)

Taherabad (Persian: طاهراباد, also Romanized as Ţāherābād) is a village in Hajjilar-e Jonubi Rural District, Hajjilar District, Chaypareh County, West Azerbaijan Province, Iran. At the 2006 census, its population was 226, in 39 families.
