= Qarah Tappeh, Chaypareh =

Qarah Tappeh قره‌تپه
- Village
- Location within Iran
- Coordinates: 38°57′48″N 45°08′38″E
- Country: Iran
- Province: West Azerbaijan
- County: Chaypareh
- Bakhsh: Hajjilar
- Rural District: Hajjilar-e Shomali

Population (2006)
  - Total: 94
- Time zone: UTC+3:30 (IRST)
  - Summer (DST): UTC+4:30 (IRDT)

Qarah Tappeh (Persian: قره‌تپه, also Romanized as Qareh Tappeh) is a village in Hajjilar-e Shomali Rural District, Hajjilar District, Chaypareh County, West Azerbaijan Province, Iran. At the 2006 census, its population was 94, in 19 families.
