= Marqesheh =

Village in West Azerbaijan province, Iran

Marqesheh Persian: مرقشه
- Village
- Location within Iran
- Coordinates: 38°52′22″N 45°00′35″E
- Country: Iran
- Province: West Azerbaijan
- County: Chaypareh
- District: Central
- Rural District: Churs

Population (2016)
  - Total: 292
- Time zone: UTC+3:30 (IRST)

Marqesheh (Persian: مرقشه) (Note: Also romanized as Mārqesheh) is a village in Churs Rural District of the Central District in Chaypareh County, West Azerbaijan province, Iran.

== Demographics ==
=== Population ===
At the time of the 2006 National Census, the village's population was 260 in 57 households, when it was in the former Chaypareh District of Khoy County. The following census in 2011 counted 244 people in 71 households, by which time the district had been separated from the county in the establishment of Chaypareh County. The rural district was transferred to the new Central District. The 2016 census measured the population of the village as 292 people in 74 households.
