= Qarah Kandi =

Village in West Azerbaijan province, Iran

Qarah Kandi Persian: قره كندي
- Village
- Location within Iran
- Coordinates: 38°54′19″N 45°00′33″E
- Country: Iran
- Province: West Azerbaijan
- County: Chaypareh
- District: Central
- Rural District: Qarah Zia ol Din

Population (2016)
  - Total: 2,141
- Time zone: UTC+3:30 (IRST)

Qarah Kandi (Persian: قره كندي) (Note: Also romanized as Qarah Kandī and Qareh Kandī) is a village in Qarah Zia ol Din Rural District of the Central District in Chaypareh County, West Azerbaijan province, Iran.

== Demographics ==
=== Population ===
At the time of the 2006 National Census, the village's population was 1,018 in 242 households, when it was in the former Chaypareh District of Khoy County. The following census in 2011 counted 1,606 people in 442 households, by which time the district had been separated from the county in the establishment of Chaypareh County. The rural district was transferred to the new Central District. The 2016 census measured the population of the village as 2,141 people in 581 households. It was the most populous village in its rural district.
