= Qanat-e Mirza Jalil =

Village in West Azerbaijan province, Iran

Qanat-e Mirza Jalil Persian: قناتميرزاجليل
- Village
- Location within Iran
- Coordinates: 38°50′40″N 45°00′36″E
- Country: Iran
- Province: West Azerbaijan
- County: Chaypareh
- District: Central
- Rural District: Churs

Population (2016)
  - Total: 647
- Time zone: UTC+3:30 (IRST)

Qanat-e Mirza Jalil (Persian: قناتميرزاجليل) (Note: Also romanized as Qanāt-e Mīrzā Jalīl; also known as Kahrīz (كهريز)) is a village in Churs Rural District of the Central District in Chaypareh County, West Azerbaijan province, Iran.

== Demographics ==
=== Population ===
At the time of the 2006 National Census, the village's population was 602 in 144 households, when it was in the former Chaypareh District of Khoy County. The following census in 2011 counted 618 people in 179 households, by which time the district had been separated from the county in the establishment of Chaypareh County. The rural district was transferred to the new Central District. The 2016 census measured the population of the village as 647 people in 193 households.
