= Khaneqah-e Churs =

Village in West Azerbaijan province, Iran

Khaneqah-e Churs Persian: خانقاه چورس
- Village
- Location within Iran
- Coordinates: 38°49′51″N 45°00′38″E
- Country: Iran
- Province: West Azerbaijan
- County: Chaypareh
- District: Central
- Rural District: Churs

Population (2016)
  - Total: 830
- Time zone: UTC+3:30 (IRST)

Khaneqah-e Churs (Persian: خانقاه چورس) (Note: Also romanized as Khāneqāh-e Chūrs; also known as Khaneqah, Khāneqāh, Khānīyeh, and Khānqāh (خانقاه)) is a village in Churs Rural District of the Central District in Chaypareh County, West Azerbaijan province, Iran.

== Demographics ==
=== Population ===
At the time of the 2006 National Census, the village's population was 792 in 167 households, when it was in the former Chaypareh District of Khoy County. The following census in 2011 counted 772 people in 223 households, by which time the district had been separated from the county in the establishment of Chaypareh County. The rural district was transferred to the new Central District. The 2016 census measured the population of the village as 830 people in 252 households.
