= Badaki, Chaypareh =

Village in West Azerbaijan province, Iran

Badaki Persian: بادكي
- Village
- Location within Iran
- Coordinates: 38°52′53″N 44°59′35″E
- Country: Iran
- Province: West Azerbaijan
- County: Chaypareh
- District: Central
- Rural District: Qarah Zia ol Din

Population (2016)
  - Total: 827
- Time zone: UTC+3:30 (IRST)

Badaki (Persian: بادكي) (Note: Also romanized as Bādakī) is a village in Qarah Zia ol Din Rural District of the Central District in Chaypareh County, West Azerbaijan province, Iran.

== Demographics ==
=== Population ===
At the time of the 2006 National Census, the village's population was 818 in 226 households, when it was in the former Chaypareh District of Khoy County. The following census in 2011 counted 833 people in 249 households, by which time the district had been separated from the county in the establishment of Chaypareh County. The rural district was transferred to the new Central District. The 2016 census measured the population of the village as 827 people in 258 households.
