= Agh Mazar-e Kord =

Agh Mazar-e Kord اغمزاركرد
- Village
- Location within Iran
- Coordinates: 38°54′11″N 44°45′40″E
- Country: Iran
- Province: West Azerbaijan
- County: Chaypareh
- Bakhsh: Central
- Rural District: Bastam

Population (2006)
  - Total: 134
- Time zone: UTC+3:30 (IRST)
  - Summer (DST): UTC+4:30 (IRDT)

Agh Mazar-e Kord (Persian: اغمزاركرد, also Romanized as Āgh Mazār-e Kord; also known as Āq Mazār) is a village in Bastam Rural District, in the Central District of Chaypareh County, West Azerbaijan Province, Iran. At the 2006 census, its population was 134, in 25 families.
