= Gurash =

Gurash گورش
- Village
- Location within Iran
- Coordinates: 38°54′05″N 44°43′37″E
- Country: Iran
- Province: West Azerbaijan
- County: Chaypareh
- Bakhsh: Central
- Rural District: Bastam

Population (2006)
  - Total: 220
- Time zone: UTC+3:30 (IRST)
  - Summer (DST): UTC+4:30 (IRDT)

Gurash (Persian: گورش, also Romanized as Gūrash; also known as Kūrash) is a village in Bastam Rural District, in the Central District of Chaypareh County, West Azerbaijan Province, Iran. At the 2006 census, its population was 220, in 42 families.
