= Chumaran =

Chumaran چومران
- Village
- Location within Iran
- Coordinates: 38°53′39″N 44°58′44″E
- Country: Iran
- Province: West Azerbaijan
- County: Chaypareh
- Bakhsh: Central
- Rural District: Bastam

Population (2006)
  - Total: 77
- Time zone: UTC+3:30 (IRST)
  - Summer (DST): UTC+4:30 (IRDT)

Chumaran (Persian: چومران, also Romanized as Chūmarān; also known as Chūmsarān) is a village in Bastam Rural District, in the Central District of Chaypareh County, West Azerbaijan Province, Iran. At the 2006 census, its population was 77, in 15 families.
