= Akhurlu =

Akhurlu اخورلو
- Village
- Location within Iran
- Coordinates: 38°46′16″N 44°58′30″E
- Country: Iran
- Province: West Azerbaijan
- County: Chaypareh
- Bakhsh: Central
- Rural District: Churs

Population (2006)
  - Total: 66
- Time zone: UTC+3:30 (IRST)
  - Summer (DST): UTC+4:30 (IRDT)

Akhurlu (Persian: اخورلو, also Romanized as Ākhūrlū; also known as Ākhvorlī) is a village in Churs Rural District, in the Central District of Chaypareh County, West Azerbaijan Province, Iran. At the 2006 census, its population was 66, in 17 families.
