= Qanat-e Baqer Beyk =

Village in West Azerbaijan province, Iran

Qanat-e Baqer Beyk Persian: قنات باقربيك
- Village
- Location within Iran
- Coordinates: 38°54′42″N 45°00′48″E
- Country: Iran
- Province: West Azerbaijan
- County: Chaypareh
- District: Central
- Rural District: Qarah Zia ol Din

Population (2016)
  - Total: 532
- Time zone: UTC+3:30 (IRST)

Qanat-e Baqer Beyk (Persian: قنات باقربيك) (Note: Also romanized as Qanāt-e Bāqer Beyk; also known as Bāqerīn Kandī (باقرين كندي)) is a village in Qarah Zia ol Din Rural District of the Central District in Chaypareh County, West Azerbaijan province, Iran.

== Demographics ==
=== Population ===
At the time of the 2006 National Census, the village's population was 442 in 104 households, when it was in the former Chaypareh District of Khoy County. The following census in 2011 counted 484 people in 127 households, by which time the district had been separated from the county in the establishment of Chaypareh County. The rural district was transferred to the new Central District. The 2016 census measured the population of the village as 532 people in 141 households.
