= Kuzdagan =

Kuzdagan كوزدگن
- Village
- Location within Iran
- Coordinates: 38°56′00″N 44°55′00″E
- Country: Iran
- Province: West Azerbaijan
- County: Chaypareh
- Bakhsh: Central
- Rural District: Bastam

Population (2006)
  - Total: 61
- Time zone: UTC+3:30 (IRST)
  - Summer (DST): UTC+4:30 (IRDT)

Kuzdagan (Persian: كوزدگن, also Romanized as Kūzdagan; also known as Gezdagian, Goz Dagan, and Gūzdakan) is a village in Bastam Rural District, in the Central District of Chaypareh County, West Azerbaijan Province, Iran. At the 2006 census, its population was 61, in 15 families.
