= Allah Verdi Kandi, Chaypareh =

Village in West Azerbaijan province, Iran

Allah Verdi Kandi Persian: الهوردي كندي
- Village
- Location within Iran
- Coordinates: 38°50′24″N 45°05′36″E
- Country: Iran
- Province: West Azerbaijan
- County: Chaypareh
- District: Hajjilar
- Rural District: Hajjilar-e Jonubi

Population (2016)
  - Total: 543
- Time zone: UTC+3:30 (IRST)

Allah Verdi Kandi (Persian: الهوردي كندي) (Note: Also romanized as Allāh Verdī Kandī and Allāhverdī Kandī) is a village in Hajjilar-e Jonubi Rural District (Note: Formerly Hajjilar Rural District) of Hajjilar District in Chaypareh County, West Azerbaijan province, Iran.

== Demographics ==
=== Population ===
At the time of the 2006 National Census, the village's population was 531 in 103 households, when it was in Hajjilar Rural District (Note: Renamed Hajjilar-e Jonubi Rural District) of the former Chaypareh District in Khoy County. The following census in 2011 counted 598 people in 162 households, by which time the district had been separated from the county in the establishment of Chaypareh County. The rural district was transferred to the new Hajjilar District and renamed Hajjilar-e Jonubi Rural District. The 2016 census measured the population of the village as 543 people in 144 households.
