= Shurik, Chaypareh =

Village in West Azerbaijan province, Iran

Shurik Persian: شوريك
- Village
- Location within Iran
- Coordinates: 38°53′08″N 44°54′21″E
- Country: Iran
- Province: West Azerbaijan
- County: Chaypareh
- District: Central
- Rural District: Qarah Zia ol Din

Population (2016)
  - Total: 315
- Time zone: UTC+3:30 (IRST)

Shurik (Persian: شوريك) (Note: Also romanized as Shūrīk) is a village in Qarah Zia ol Din Rural District of the Central District in Chaypareh County, West Azerbaijan province, Iran.

== Demographics ==
=== Population ===
At the time of the 2006 National Census, the village's population was 241 in 38 households, when it was in the former Chaypareh District of Khoy County. The following census in 2011 counted 244 people in 50 households, by which time the district had been separated from the county in the establishment of Chaypareh County. The rural district was transferred to the new Central District. The 2016 census measured the population of the village as 315 people in 87 households.
