= Dizaj-e Hatam Khan =

Village in West Azerbaijan, Iran

Dizaj-e Hatam Khan ديزج حاتمخان
- Village
- Location within Iran
- Coordinates: 38°51′53″N 45°04′32″E
- Country: Iran
- Province: West Azerbaijan
- County: Chaypareh
- Bakhsh: Hajjilar
- Rural District: Hajjilar-e Jonubi

Population (2006)
  - Total: 297
- Time zone: UTC+3:30 (IRST)
  - Summer (DST): UTC+4:30 (IRDT)

Dizaj-e Hatam Khan (Persian: ديزج حاتمخان, also Romanized as Dīzaj-e Ḩātam Khān) is a village in Hajjilar-e Jonubi Rural District, Hajjilar District, Chaypareh County, West Azerbaijan Province, Iran. At the 2006 census, its population was 297, in 69 families.
