= Yatim Aghli =

Yatim Aghli يتيم اغلي
- Village
- Location within Iran
- Coordinates: 38°58′31″N 44°59′10″E
- Country: Iran
- Province: West Azerbaijan
- County: Chaypareh
- Bakhsh: Hajjilar
- Rural District: Hajjilar-e Shomali

Population (2006)
  - Total: 114
- Time zone: UTC+3:30 (IRST)
  - Summer (DST): UTC+4:30 (IRDT)

Yatim Aghli (Persian: يتيم اغلي, also Romanized as Yatīm Āghlī and Yatīm Āgholī; also known as Atamkolī, Etmagli, Etmakli, and Yatīm Āqolī) is a village in Hajjilar-e Shomali Rural District, Hajjilar District, Chaypareh County, West Azerbaijan Province, Iran. At the 2006 census, its population was 114, in 30 families.
