= Shetow =

Shto شطو
- Village
- Location within Iran
- Coordinates: 38°56′07″N 44°48′03″E
- Country: Iran
- Province: West Azerbaijan
- County: Chaypareh
- Bakhsh: Central
- Rural District: Bastam

Population (2006)
  - Total: 55
- Time zone: UTC+3:30 (IRST)
  - Summer (DST): UTC+4:30 (IRDT)

Shtov (Persian: شطو, also Romanized as Shtov) is a village in Bastam Rural District, in the Central District of Chaypareh County, West Azerbaijan Province, Iran. At the 2024 census, its population was 20, in 5 families.
