= Qarah Kahriz, Chaypareh =

Village in West Azerbaijan province, Iran

Qarah Kahriz Persian: قره كهريز
- Village
- Location within Iran
- Coordinates: 38°50′30″N 44°55′39″E
- Country: Iran
- Province: West Azerbaijan
- County: Chaypareh
- District: Central
- Rural District: Churs

Population (2016)
  - Total: 186
- Time zone: UTC+3:30 (IRST)

Qarah Kahriz (Persian: قره كهريز) (Note: Also romanized as Qarah Kahrīz and Qareh Kahrīz) is a village in Churs Rural District of the Central District in Chaypareh County, West Azerbaijan province, Iran.

== Demographics ==
=== Population ===
At the time of the 2006 National Census, the village's population was 175 in 43 households, when it was in the former Chaypareh District of Khoy County. The following census in 2011 counted 168 people in 41 households, by which time the district had been separated from the county in the establishment of Chaypareh County. The rural district was transferred to the new Central District. The 2016 census measured the population of the village as 186 people in 61 households.
