= Beyg Darvish =

Village in West Azerbaijan province, Iran

Beyg Darvish Persian: بيگ درويش
- Village
- Location within Iran
- Coordinates: 38°50′32″N 45°04′56″E
- Country: Iran
- Province: West Azerbaijan
- County: Chaypareh
- District: Hajjilar
- Rural District: Hajjilar-e Jonubi

Population (2016)
  - Total: 444
- Time zone: UTC+3:30 (IRST)

Beyg Darvish (Persian: بيگ درويش) (Note: Also romanized as Beyg Darvīsh) is a village in Hajjilar-e Jonubi Rural District (Note: Formerly Hajjilar Rural District) of Hajjilar District in Chaypareh County, West Azerbaijan province, Iran.

== Demographics ==
=== Population ===
At the time of the 2006 National Census, the village's population was 442 in 89 households, when it was in Hajjilar Rural District (Note: Renamed Hajjilar-e Jonubi Rural District) of the former Chaypareh District in Khoy County. The following census in 2011 counted 456 people in 111 households, by which time the district had been separated from the county in the establishment of Chaypareh County. The rural district was transferred to the new Hajjilar District and renamed Hajjilar-e Jonubi Rural District. The 2016 census measured the population of the village as 444 people in 113 households.
