= Babelabad =

Village in West Azerbaijan province, Iran

Babelabad Persian: بابل اباد
- Village
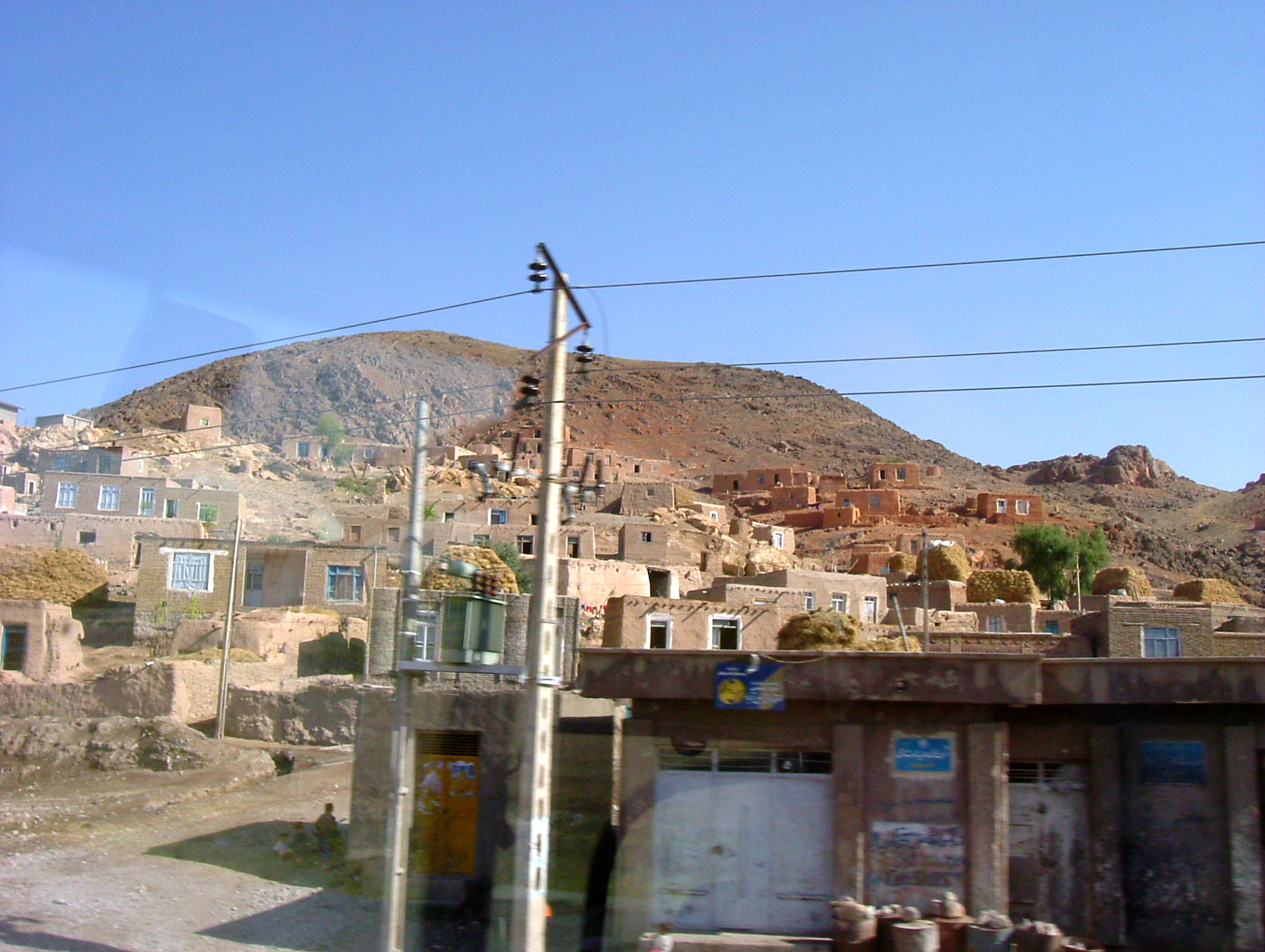
- Babelabad, Iran

- Location within Iran
- Coordinates: 38°52′37″N 45°05′45″E
- Country: Iran
- Province: West Azerbaijan
- County: Chaypareh
- District: Hajjilar
- Rural District: Hajjilar-e Jonubi

Population (2016)
  - Total: 1,200
- Time zone: UTC+3:30 (IRST)

Babelabad (Persian: بابل اباد) (Note: Also romanized as Bābelābād) is a village in Hajjilar-e Jonubi Rural District (Note: Formerly Hajjilar Rural District) of Hajjilar District in Chaypareh County, West Azerbaijan province, Iran.

== Demographics ==
=== Population ===
At the time of the 2006 National Census, the village's population was 1,164 in 242 households, when it was in Hajjilar Rural District (Note: Renamed Hajjilar-e Jonubi Rural District) of the former Chaypareh District in Khoy County. The following census in 2011 counted 1,248 people in 293 households, by which time the district had been separated from the county in the establishment of Chaypareh County. The rural district was transferred to the new Hajjilar District and renamed Hajjilar-e Jonubi Rural District. The 2016 census measured the population of the village as 1,200 people in 288 households.
