= Shekar Bolaghi-ye Olya =

Shekar Bolaghi-ye Olya شكربلاغي عليا
- Village
- Location within Iran
- Coordinates: 38°56′02″N 44°46′21″E
- Country: Iran
- Province: West Azerbaijan
- County: Chaypareh
- Bakhsh: Central
- Rural District: Bastam

Population (2006)
  - Total: 48
- Time zone: UTC+3:30 (IRST)
  - Summer (DST): UTC+4:30 (IRDT)

Shekar Bolaghi-ye Olya (Persian: شكربلاغي عليا, also Romanized as Shekar Bolāghī-ye ‘Olyā; also known as Shekar Bolāghī) is a village in Bastam Rural District, in the Central District of Chaypareh County, West Azerbaijan Province, Iran. At the 2006 census, its population was 48, in 10 families.
