= Bastam (disambiguation) =

Bastam is a city in Semnan Province, Iran.

Bastam (Persian: بسطام) may also refer to:

- Bastam Citadel, a Urartian fort
- Bastam, Kurdistan
- Bastam, Mazandaran
- Bastam, West Azerbaijan
- Bastam District, in Semnan Province
