= Ideluy-e Olya =

Ideluy-e Olya ايدلوي عليا
- Village
- Location within Iran
- Coordinates: 38°45′42″N 44°59′44″E
- Country: Iran
- Province: West Azerbaijan
- County: Chaypareh
- Bakhsh: Central
- Rural District: Churs

Population (2006)
  - Total: 30
- Time zone: UTC+3:30 (IRST)
  - Summer (DST): UTC+4:30 (IRDT)

Ideluy-e Olya (Persian: ايدلوي عليا, also Romanized as Īdelūy-e ‘Olyā; also known as Īgdalū-ye Bālā) is a village in Churs Rural District, in the Central District of Chaypareh County, West Azerbaijan Province, Iran. At the 2006 census, its population was 30, in 7 families.
