= Qameshkan =

Qameshkan (Persian: قمشكان), also rendered as Qameshgan, may refer to:

- Qameshkan-e Olya
- Qameshkan-e Sofla
