= Abbas Bolaghi, Chaypareh =

Abbas Bolaghi عباس بلاغي
- Village
- Location within Iran
- Coordinates: 38°56′38″N 44°47′55″E
- Country: Iran
- Province: West Azerbaijan
- County: Chaypareh
- Bakhsh: Central
- Rural District: Bastam

Population (2006)
  - Total: 84
- Time zone: UTC+3:30 (IRST)
  - Summer (DST): UTC+4:30 (IRDT)

Abbas Bolaghi (Persian: عباس بلاغي, also Romanized as ‘Abbās Bolāghī; also known as ‘Abbās Bolāgh) is a village in Bastam Rural District, in the Central District of Chaypareh County, West Azerbaijan Province, Iran. At the 2006 census, its population was 84, in 19 families.
