= Bastam, West Azerbaijan =

Village in West Azerbaijan province, Iran

Bastam Persian: بسطام
- Village
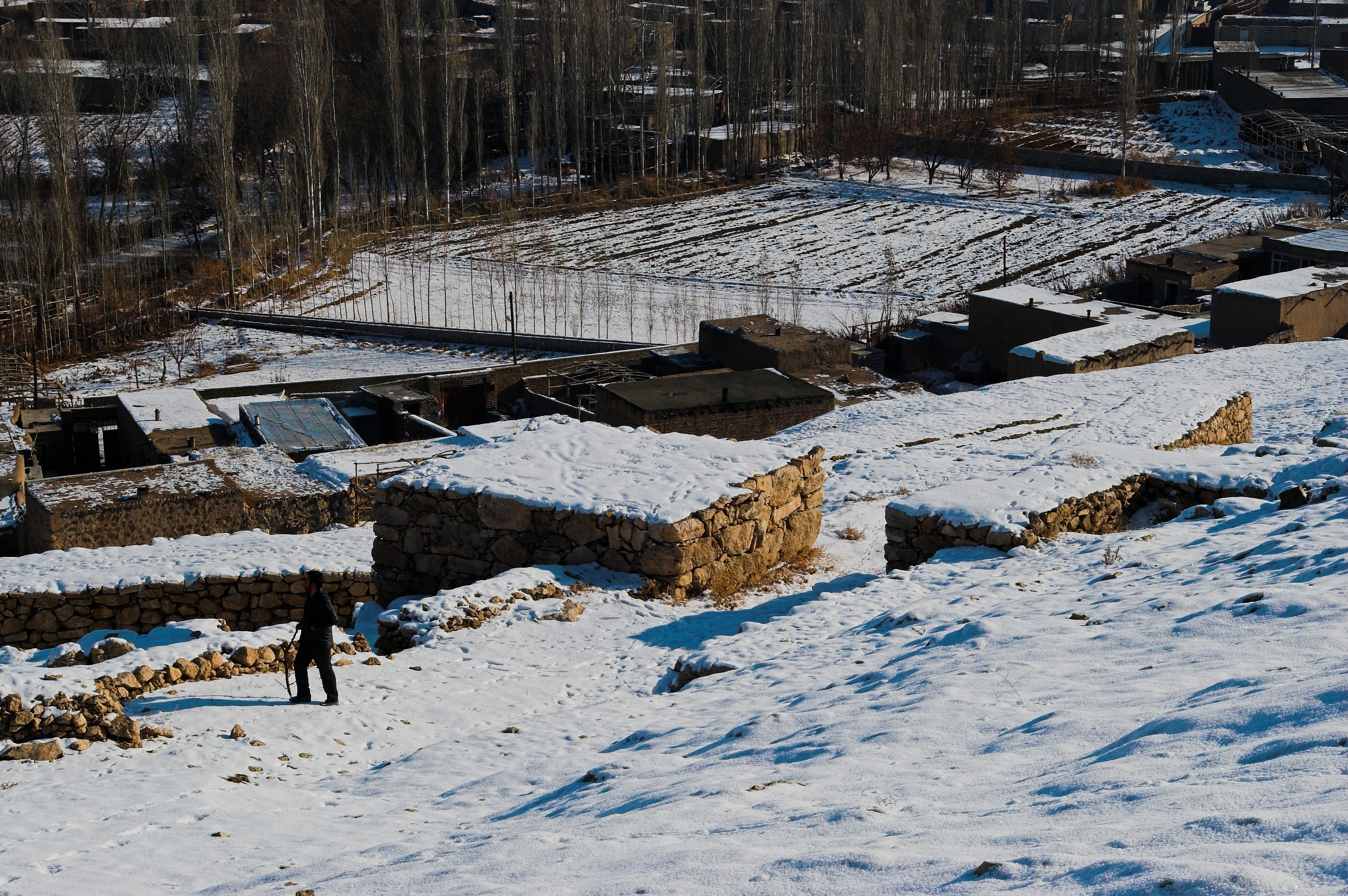

- Location within Iran
- Coordinates: 38°53′05″N 44°57′17″E
- Country: Iran
- Province: West Azerbaijan
- County: Chaypareh
- District: Central
- Rural District: Qarah Zia ol Din

Population (2016)
  - Total: 447
- Time zone: UTC+3:30 (IRST)

Bastam (Persian: بسطام) (Note: Also romanized as Basţām) is a village in, and the capital of, Qarah Zia ol Din Rural District in the Central District of Chaypareh County, West Azerbaijan province, Iran.

== Demographics ==
=== Population ===
At the time of the 2006 National Census, the village's population was 681 in 155 households, when it was in the former Chaypareh District of Khoy County. The following census in 2011 counted 622 people in 162 households, by which time the district had been separated from the county in the establishment of Chaypareh County. The rural district was transferred to the new Central District. The 2016 census measured the population of the village as 447 people in 131 households.

== Archaeology ==
Headed by Wolfram Kleiss, the German Archaeological Institute excavated a Urartean site dating to the 7th cent. BC at Bastam in 1972–1975 and 1977–1978.
