= Hamzian-e Olya =

Hamzian-e Olya حمزيان عليا
- Village
- Location within Iran
- Coordinates: 38°47′09″N 44°55′30″E
- Country: Iran
- Province: West Azerbaijan
- County: Chaypareh
- Bakhsh: Central
- Rural District: Churs

Population (2006)
  - Total: 94
- Time zone: UTC+3:30 (IRST)
  - Summer (DST): UTC+4:30 (IRDT)

Hamzian-e Olya (Persian: حمزيان عليا, also Romanized as Ḩamzīān-e ‘Olyā and Ḩamzīān ‘Olya; also known as Ḩamzīān-e Bālā) is a village in the Churs Rural District in the Central District of Chaypareh County, West Azerbaijan Province, Iran. According to the 2006 census, its population was 94, in 23 families.
