= Qameshkan-e Sofla =

Qameshkan-e Sofla قمشكان سفلي
- Village
- Location within Iran
- Coordinates: 38°56′18″N 44°57′44″E
- Country: Iran
- Province: West Azerbaijan
- County: Chaypareh
- Bakhsh: Central
- Rural District: Bastam

Population (2006)
  - Total: 92
- Time zone: UTC+3:30 (IRST)
  - Summer (DST): UTC+4:30 (IRDT)

Qameshkan-e Sofla (Persian: قمشكان سفلي, also Romanized as Qameshkān-e Soflá; also known as Qameshgān-e Pā'īn and Qameshgān-e Soflá) is a village in Bastam Rural District, in the Central District of Chaypareh County, West Azerbaijan Province, Iran. At the 2006 census, its population was 92, in 24 families.
