= Kura Bolagh =

Kura Bolagh or Kurabolagh (Persian: كورابلاغ) may refer to:

- Kura Bolagh, East Azerbaijan
- Kura Bolagh, Chaypareh, West Azerbaijan Province
- Kura Bolagh, Showt, West Azerbaijan Province

== See also ==
- Kur Bolagh (disambiguation)
