= Hajji Ahmad (disambiguation) =

Hajji Ahmad may refer to:

- Hajji Ahmad, a village located in Zanjan Province, Iran
- Hajji Ahmad Kandi, a village located in West Azerbaijan Province, Iran
- Hajji Ahmad Shahvazayi, a village located in Sistan and Baluchestan Province, Iran
- Hacı Ahmet, Ottoman cartographer
