= Ideluy-e Sofla =

Ideluy-e Sofla ايدلوي سفلي
- Village
- Location within Iran
- Coordinates: 38°45′13″N 45°00′31″E
- Country: Iran
- Province: West Azerbaijan
- County: Chaypareh
- Bakhsh: Central
- Rural District: Churs

Population (2006)
  - Total: 37
- Time zone: UTC+3:30 (IRST)
  - Summer (DST): UTC+4:30 (IRDT)

Ideluy-e Sofla (Persian: ايدلوي سفلي, also Romanized as Īdelūy-e Soflá; also known as Īdehlū-ye Pā'īn) is a village in Churs Rural District, in the Central District of Chaypareh County, West Azerbaijan Province, Iran. At the 2006 census, its population was 37, in 5 families.
