= Hajji Ahmad Kandi =

Hajji Ahmad Kandi حاجي احمدكندي
- Village
- Location within Iran
- Coordinates: 38°51′36″N 45°08′57″E
- Country: Iran
- Province: West Azerbaijan
- County: Chaypareh
- Bakhsh: Hajjilar
- Rural District: Hajjilar-e Jonubi

Population (2006)
  - Total: 345
- Time zone: UTC+3:30 (IRST)
  - Summer (DST): UTC+4:30 (IRDT)

Hajji Ahmad Kandi (Persian: حاجي احمدكندي, also Romanized as Ḩājjī Aḩmad Kandī and Ḩājī Aḩmad Kandī) is a village in Hajjilar-e Jonubi Rural District, Hajjilar District, Chaypareh County, West Azerbaijan Province, Iran. At the 2006 census, its population was 345, in 75 families.
