= Behestan, West Azerbaijan =

Village in Iran

Behestan بهستان
- Village
- Location within Iran
- Coordinates: 38°49′10″N 44°52′38″E
- Country: Iran
- Province: West Azerbaijan
- County: Chaypareh
- Bakhsh: Central
- Rural District: Bastam

Population (2006)
  - Total: 49
- Time zone: UTC+3:30 (IRST)
  - Summer (DST): UTC+4:30 (IRDT)

Behestan (Persian: بهستان, also Romanized as Behestān; also known as Bīstān) is a village in Bastam Rural District, in the Central District of Chaypareh County, West Azerbaijan Province, Iran. At the 2006 census, its population was 49, in 14 families.
