= Qurul-e Olya =

Qurul-e Olya قورول عليا
- Village
- Location within Iran
- Coordinates: 38°50′44″N 44°48′51″E
- Country: Iran
- Province: West Azerbaijan
- County: Chaypareh
- Bakhsh: Central
- Rural District: Bastam

Population (2006)
  - Total: 230
- Time zone: UTC+3:30 (IRST)
  - Summer (DST): UTC+4:30 (IRDT)

Qurul-e Olya (Persian: قورول عليا, also Romanized as Qūrūl-e ‘Olyā; also known as Qūrūl-e Bālā) is a village in Bastam Rural District, in the Central District of Chaypareh County, West Azerbaijan Province, Iran. At the 2006 census, its population was 230, in 41 families.
