= Zangelan-e Olya =

Zangelan-e Olya زنگلان عليا
- Village
- Location within Iran
- Coordinates: 38°51′27″N 45°06′43″E
- Country: Iran
- Province: West Azerbaijan
- County: Chaypareh
- Bakhsh: Hajjilar
- Rural District: Hajjilar-e Jonubi

Population (2006)
  - Total: 326
- Time zone: UTC+3:30 (IRST)
  - Summer (DST): UTC+4:30 (IRDT)

Zangelan-e Olya (Persian: زنگلان عليا, also Romanized as Zangelān-e ‘Olyā; also known as Zangelān-e Bālā) is a village in Hajjilar-e Jonubi Rural District, Hajjilar District, Chaypareh County, West Azerbaijan Province, Iran. At the 2006 census, its population was 326, in 89 families.
