= Qurul =

Qurul (Persian: قورول) may refer to:

- Qurul-e Olya
- Qurul-e Sofla
