= Qurul-e Sofla =

Qurul-e Sofla قورول سفلي
- Village
- Location within Iran
- Coordinates: 38°51′41″N 44°53′53″E
- Country: Iran
- Province: West Azerbaijan
- County: Chaypareh
- Bakhsh: Central
- Rural District: Bastam

Population (2006)
  - Total: 217
- Time zone: UTC+3:30 (IRST)
  - Summer (DST): UTC+4:30 (IRDT)

Qurul-e Sofla (Persian: قورول سفلي, also Romanized as Qūrūl-e Soflá; also known as Qūrūl-e Pā'īn) is a village in Bastam Rural District, in the Central District of Chaypareh County, West Azerbaijan Province, Iran. At the 2006 census, its population was 217, in 51 families.
