= Zangelan-e Sofla =

Village in West Azerbaijan province, Iran

Zangelan-e Sofla Persian: زنگلان سفلي
- Village
- Location within Iran
- Coordinates: 38°51′30″N 45°07′58″E
- Country: Iran
- Province: West Azerbaijan
- County: Chaypareh
- District: Hajjilar
- Rural District: Hajjilar-e Jonubi

Population (2016)
  - Total: 581
- Time zone: UTC+3:30 (IRST)

Zangelan-e Sofla (Persian: زنگلان سفلي) (Note: Also romanized as Zangelān-e Soflá; also known as Zangalān Pā’īn and Zangelān-e Pā'īn) is a village in Hajjilar-e Jonubi Rural District (Note: Formerly Hajjilar Rural District) of Hajjilar District in Chaypareh County, West Azerbaijan province, Iran.

== Demographics ==
=== Population ===
At the time of the 2006 National Census, the village's population was 734 in 167 households, when it was in Hajjilar Rural District (Note: Renamed Hajjilar-e Jonubi Rural District) of the former Chaypareh District in Khoy County. The following census in 2011 counted 585 people in 193 households, by which time the district had been separated from the county in the establishment of Chaypareh County. The rural district was transferred to the new Hajjilar District and renamed Hajjilar-e Jonubi Rural District. The 2016 census measured the population of the village as 581 people in 201 households.
