= Hamzian =

Hamzian or Hamziyan (Persian: حمزيان) may refer to:

- Hamziyan, Markazi
- Hamzian-e Olya, West Azerbaijan Province
- Hamzian-e Sofla, West Azerbaijan Province
