= Kamalabad, West Azerbaijan =

Village in West Azerbaijan province, Iran

Kamalabad Persian: كامل اباد
- Village
- Location within Iran
- Coordinates: 38°57′50″N 45°02′53″E
- Country: Iran
- Province: West Azerbaijan
- County: Chaypareh
- District: Hajjilar
- Rural District: Hajjilar-e Shomali

Population (2016)
  - Total: 302
- Time zone: UTC+3:30 (IRST)

Kamalabad (Persian: كامل اباد) (Note: Also romanized as Kamālābād; also known as Kermamakand, Kharmam Kand, Kher Mameh Kand, Khermāmākand, Khermameh Kand, and Kheyr Mameh Kandī) is a village in, and the capital of, Hajjilar-e Shomali Rural District in Hajjilar District of Chaypareh County, West Azerbaijan province, Iran.

== Demographics ==
=== Population ===
At the time of the 2006 National Census, the village's population was 380 in 79 households, when it was in Hajjilar Rural District (Note: Renamed Hajjilar-e Jonubi Rural District) of the former Chaypareh District in Khoy County. The following census in 2011 counted 368 people in 113 households, by which time the district had been separated from the county in the establishment of Chaypareh County. The rural district was transferred to the new Hajjilar District and renamed Hajjilar-e Jonubi Rural District. Kamalabad was transferred to Hajjilar-e Shomali Rural District created in the same district. The 2016 census measured the population of the village as 302 people in 95 households.
