= Qameshkan-e Olya =

Qameshkan-e Olya قمشكان عليا
- Village
- Location within Iran
- Coordinates: 38°48′30″N 44°56′39″E
- Country: Iran
- Province: West Azerbaijan
- County: Chaypareh
- Bakhsh: Central
- Rural District: Churs

Population (2006)
  - Total: 28
- Time zone: UTC+3:30 (IRST)
  - Summer (DST): UTC+4:30 (IRDT)

Qameshkan-e Olya (Persian: قمشكان عليا, also Romanized as Qameshkān-e ‘Olyā; also known as Qameshgān-e Bālā and Qamīshgān-e ‘Olyā) is a village in Churs Rural District, in the Central District of Chaypareh County, West Azerbaijan Province, Iran. At the 2006 census, its population was 28, in 8 families.
