= Hamzian-e Sofla =

Village in West Azerbaijan province, Iran

Hamzian-e Sofla Persian: حمزيان سفلي
- Village
- Location within Iran
- Coordinates: 38°48′32″N 44°54′54″E
- Country: Iran
- Province: West Azerbaijan
- County: Chaypareh
- District: Central
- Rural District: Churs

Population (2016)
  - Total: 127
- Time zone: UTC+3:30 (IRST)

Hamzian-e Sofla (Persian: حمزيان سفلي) (Note: Also romanized as Ḩamzīān Soflá and Ḩamzīān-e Soflá; also known as Ḩamzīān, Ḩamzīān-e Pā”īn, Hamzīyān, and Khamziān) is a village in Churs Rural District of the Central District in Chaypareh County, West Azerbaijan province, Iran.

== Demographics ==
=== Population ===
At the time of the 2006 National Census, the village's population was 65 in 15 households, when it was in the former Chaypareh District of Khoy County. The following census in 2011 counted 36 people in 11 households, by which time the district had been separated from the county in the establishment of Chaypareh County. The rural district was transferred to the new Central District. The 2016 census measured the population of the village as 127 people in 38 households.
