= Yusof Kandi, Chaypareh =

Yusof Kandi يوسف كندي
- Village
- Location within Iran
- Coordinates: 38°52′21″N 45°10′24″E
- Country: Iran
- Province: West Azerbaijan
- County: Chaypareh
- Bakhsh: Hajjilar
- Rural District: Hajjilar-e Jonubi

Population (2006)
  - Total: 42
- Time zone: UTC+3:30 (IRST)
  - Summer (DST): UTC+4:30 (IRDT)

Yusof Kandi (Persian: يوسف كندي, also Romanized as Yūsof Kandī) is a village in Hajjilar-e Jonubi Rural District, Hajjilar District, Chaypareh County, West Azerbaijan Province, Iran. At the 2006 census, its population was 42, in 9 families.
