= Yusof Kandi =

Yusof Kandi or Yusef Kandi (Persian: يوسف كندي) may refer to:

- Yusef Kandi, Ardabil
- Yusof Kandi, Chaypareh, West Azerbaijan Province
- Yusef Kandi, Mahabad, West Azerbaijan Province
- Yusef Kandi, Shahin Dezh, West Azerbaijan Province
