= Zangelan, Iran =

Zangelan or Zangalan (Persian: زنگلان) in Iran may refer to:

- Zangelan-e Olya
- Zangelan-e Sofla

== See also ==
- Zangelan (disambiguation)
