= United Nations Force Intervention Brigade =

Force Intervention Brigade
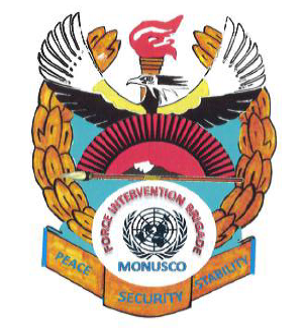
- Insignia of the FIB
- Active: April 2013–present
- Country: United Nations: South Africa; Tanzania; Malawi
- Allegiance: United Nations
- Branch: MONUSCO
- Type: Infantry
- Role: Armed peacekeeping
- Size: Brigade
- Garrison/HQ: Sake, Democratic Republic of the Congo
- Mottos: "Peace, Security, Stability"
- Engagements: Kivu conflict; Allied Democratic Forces insurgency; M23 Rebellion; M23 campaign (2022–present)

Commanders
- 2013–14: James Aloizi Mwakibolwa

The United Nations Force Intervention Brigade (FIB) is a military formation which constitutes part of the United Nations Organization Stabilization Mission in the Democratic Republic of the Congo (MONUSCO). It was authorized by the United Nations Security Council on 28 March 2013 through Resolution 2098. Although it is not the first instance in which the use of force was authorized by the UN, the Force Intervention Brigade is the first UN peacekeeping operation specifically tasked to carry out targeted offensive operations to "neutralize and disarm" groups considered a threat to state authority and civilian security. In this case, the main target was the M23 militia group, as well as other Congolese and foreign rebel groups. While such operations do not require the support of the Armed Forces of the Democratic Republic of the Congo (FARDC), the Force Intervention Brigade often acts in unison with the FARDC to disarm rebel groups.

== Background ==
=== Conflict in the Democratic Republic of the Congo ===
The origins of the conflict in the Democratic Republic of the Congo (known as Zaire until 1997) can be traced to the 1994 Rwandan genocide, during which millions of both Tutsi and Hutu Rwandans fled to the eastern Congo as refugees. One estimate by the UN High Commissioner of Human Rights suggests that as many as 7% of the Hutus that fled to the Congo were members of the Democratic Forces for the Liberation of Rwanda (FDLR), the rebel group responsible for the genocide. When the new Tutsi government was established following the genocide, an alliance was formed between Rwandan and Ugandan backed rebel forces to invade the eastern Congo in order to capture the FDLR rebels, starting the First Congo War (1996–97). This led to the collapse of the precarious regime of Mobutu Sese Seko who had been in power since 1965.

Tensions resulting from the unauthorized presence of this coalition escalated when Laurent-Désiré Kabila became the president of the Democratic Republic of the Congo. In 1998, he allied the Congo with Angola, Zimbabwe and other countries to force Rwandan and Ugandan troops out. The web of alliances and the number of conflict-related deaths, estimated around six million, gave the resulting Second Congo War (1998–2003) the popular epithet the “African World War." It was one of the most deadly conflicts in recent history, with most of these deaths being civilian casualties. Estimates from the International Rescue Committee suggest that fewer than 10 percent of victims of these conflict deaths were soldiers killed in direct combat. Violence remained widespread after 2003, with numerous local conflicts involving the kidnapping and torture of civilians as well as sexual violence. The rape of women and children has become such a widespread issue that the Congo has been titled “the rape capital of the world.” In some areas, two-thirds of all women are victims of rape and other forms of sexual violence.

=== MONUC and MONUSCO ===
To combat this humanitarian crisis in the Congo, the United Nations Security Council approved MONUC, the predecessor of the current peacekeeping mission, through resolutions Resolution 1279 (1999) and Resolution 1291 (2000). This mission, with an annual budget of over one billion USD annually, has become the most expensive and extensive peacekeeping mission to date. Unfortunately, while the mission was successful in some regards, it received widespread criticism for its failure to take direct action against the rebel groups deemed responsible for the war and violence. For example, beginning 14 May 2002, the Rwandan-backed Congolese Rally for Democracy (RCD) rebel movement engaged in “widespread killings, summary executions, rapes, and pillage” in the northern town of Kisangani. In 2003, a similar event occurred in Icari in eastern Congo. In both cases, MONUC officers refused to authorize the use of force against the rebels, maintaining that force was only permitted in self-defence under Chapter VI of the MONUC mandate.

In response to criticisms regarding the UN's failure to act in such events, the UN added “stabilisation” to the MONUC mandate, thereby reestablishing the peacekeeping operation as MONUSCO in 2010. Still, MONUSCO was criticized for its failure to take direct action using force against the rebel groups. When MONUSCO failed to act following the M23 rebels' invasion and capture of Goma in North Kivu, the international community called for the UN to reconsider MONUSCO's approach to the conflict. This plea ultimately manifested itself in the approval of the Force Intervention Brigade in 2013.

=== Beginnings of the Force Intervention Brigade ===
On 24 February 2013, the “Framework for Peace, Security and Cooperation for the DRC and the Region” was established to combat the root causes of the conflict and to encourage decentralization, security sector reform and the consolidation of state authority. The concept of the Force Intervention Brigade was first introduced at the International Conference on the Great Lakes Region (ICGLR), during which the failures of MONUSCO to end violence in the eastern Congo were highlighted and addressed. Concerns were expressed that this instability was also a threat to regional stability.

In response to these concerns, Uganda, with the support of South Africa, proposed the establishment of the Neutral Intervention Brigade, a small offensive force composed of troops from countries in the region. Unfortunately, given the lack of experienced troops and funding to complete the estimated $100 million deployment of these troops, the effort could not be completed on a strictly regional level. As a result, the concept was adopted by the UN and made into an international effort under the MONUSCO mission. Ultimately authorized after 14 years of MONUSCO presence in the Congo, the Force Intervention Brigade was embraced as a radical change in UN efforts to “break the persistent cycles of violence in DRC,” and as a shift away from traditional peacekeeping and towards peace enforcement.

== Authorisation ==
UN Security Council resolution 2098 (2013), through which the Force Intervention Brigade was first authorized, stated that the Brigade should:

"... In support of the authorities of the DRC, on the basis of information collation and analysis, and taking full account of the need to protect civilians and mitigate risk before, during and after any military operation, carry out targeted offensive operations through the Intervention Brigade... either unilaterally or jointly with the FARDC, in a robust, highly mobile and versatile manner and in strict compliance with international law, including international humanitarian law and with the human rights due diligence policy on UN-support to non-UN forces (HRDDP), to prevent the expansion of all armed groups, neutralize these groups, and to disarm them in order to contribute to the objective of reducing the threat posed by armed groups on state authority and civilian security in eastern DRC and to make space for stabilization activities."

The Force Intervention Brigade was originally authorized for a one-year period beginning in March 2013 under the MONUSCO mandate. However, since its initial approval, the Force Intervention Brigade has been reauthorized annually through Resolution 2211 (2015), which extended the MONUSCO mandate to 31 March 2016, and Resolution 2277 (2016), which extended the mandate to 31 March 2017. Most recently, through Resolution 2348 (2017), the MONUSCO mandate, and thereby the Force Intervention Brigade, was again extended until March 2018.

== Conflict location ==
The violence in the Congo has been largely contained in the east of the country, most notably in the North and South Kivu regions. Although there have been cases of conflict-related violence across the country, rebel presence in the east is especially prevalent, especially due to its proximity to the Rwandan border. These regions are largely characterized by mountainous terrain that is both difficult to control and to navigate. Many reports suggest that these rebel groups are funding their activities by exploiting the mineral-rich land in the eastern Congo and by participating in the mineral smuggling trade.

== Organisation ==
=== Formation ===
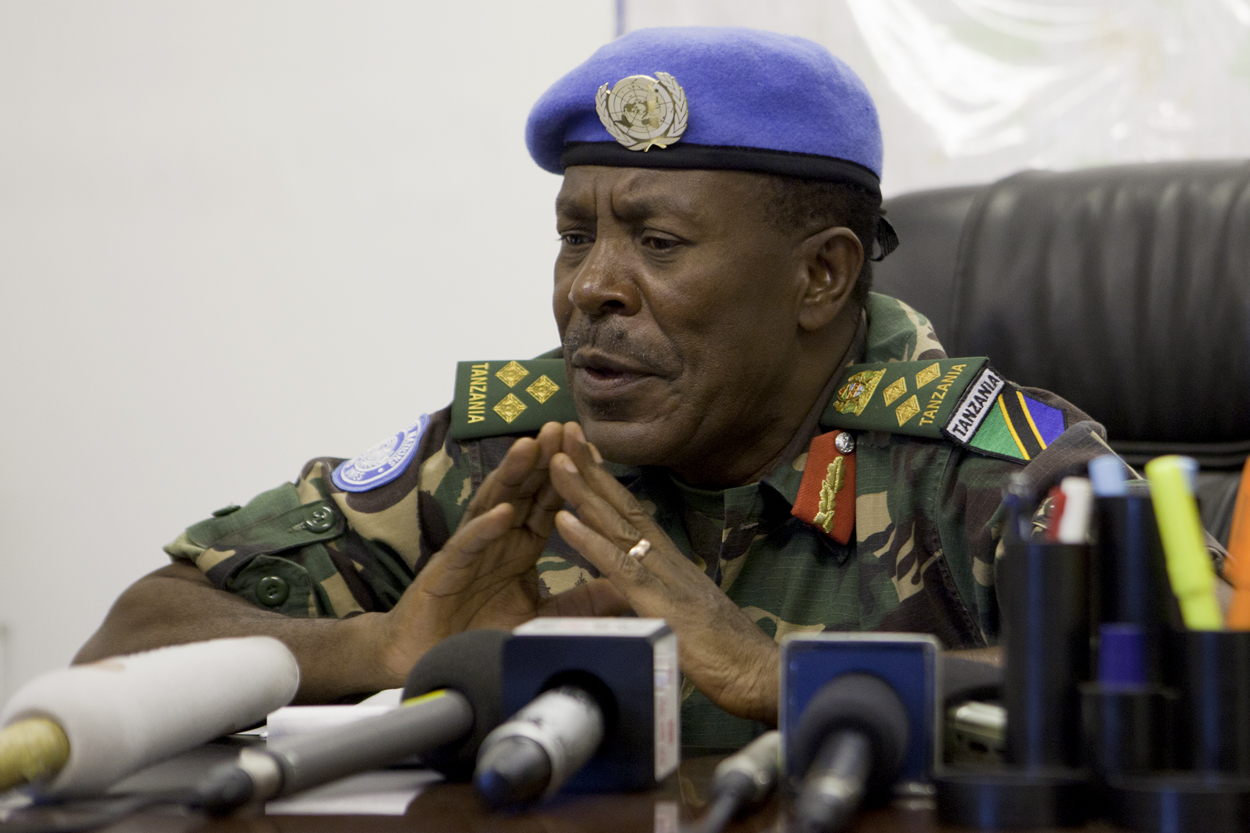
Brigadier-General James Aloizi Mwakibolwa (Tanzania) who served as the FIB's first commander and presided over the operations against M23

As per the 2013 mandate of the Force Intervention Brigade, the operation consists of three infantry battalions, one artillery and one Special Force and Reconnaissance company. When first deployed, the Force Intervention Brigade consisted of 3,069 troops, with the first 2,550 hailing evenly from Tanzania, Malawi and South Africa. Artillery, special forces and reconnaissance made up the remainder of these original troops.

The original troop ceiling, according to the 2013 mandate, was 19,815 military personnel. However, this figure has since been lowered as part of the UN's overall exit strategy from the Congo. As of Resolution 2348 (2017), the MONUSCO troop ceiling was lowered to 16,215, marking a reduction of 2,600 military personnel. While many UN representatives expressed support for the reduced troop numbers in the most recent resolution, others strongly opposed the mandated change in troop numbers from the original mandate. The representative of the Russian Federation suggested that the situation in the Congo is so complex and so urgent that a reduction in military personnel could not be justified.

=== Units ===
Artillery Battery (Tanzania)

- No details known of this Tanzanian unit.

Special Forces and Reconnaissance Company

- No details known.

South African infantry battalion (South Africa)

- 2013–2014: 6 South African Infantry Battalion (Lt. Col. Altin J. Gysman)
- 2014–2015: 5 South African Infantry Battalion (Lt. Col. M. Dyakopu)
- 2015–2016: 121 South African Infantry Battalion.
- 2016–2017: 4 South African Infantry Battalion.
- 2017–2018: 5 South African Infantry Battalion Deployed June 2017 for a 12-month tour of duty. Sixteen members of this battalion were later charged, in South Africa, with assaulting on 30 January 2018 a Congolese teenager they accused of stealing. Eleven of the 16 were convicted and sentenced.
- 2018–2019: 7 South African Infantry Battalion (Lt. Col. Tiisetso Sekgobela).
- 2019–2020: 2 South African Infantry Battalion (Lt. Col. Fanisile Kandile?) was scheduled to deploy in June 2019.
- 2020–2021: 15 South African Infantry Battalion (Lt. Col. Erick Mbazima Baloyi) deployed from October 2020 to December 2021.
- 2021–2022: 21 South African Infantry Battalion.
- 2022–2023: 10 South African Infantry Battalion deployed from November 2022 to November(?) 2023.<
- 2023–2024: 14 South African Infantry Battalion

Tanzanian infantry battalion (Tanzania)

- 2013–2014: Designated ANZBATT 1 – DRC (Lt. Col. Orestess Cassian Komba)
- Since 2014: No details known on subsequent rotations of this national unit

Malawi infantry battalion

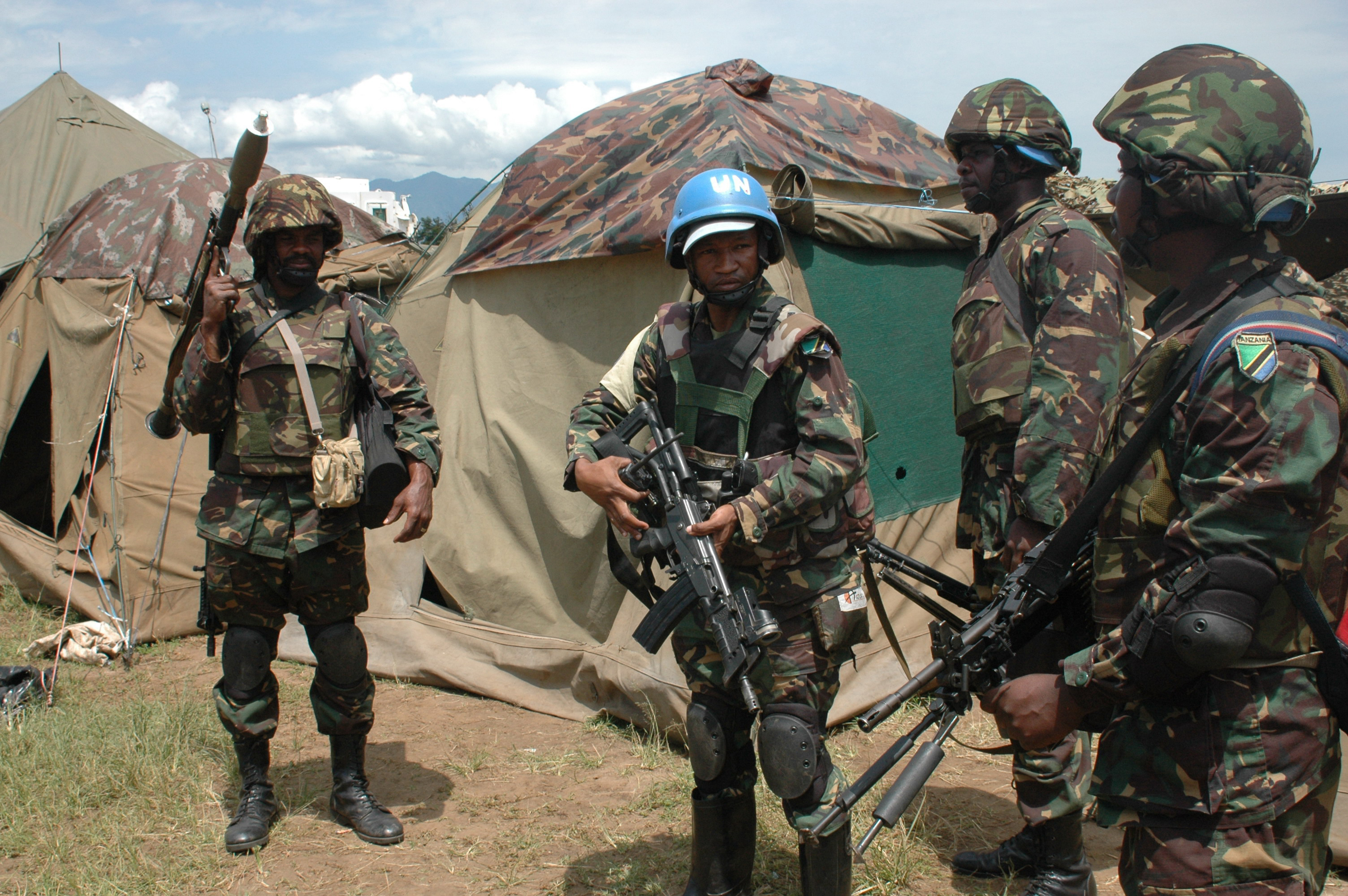
Tanzanian FIB soldier in Kiwanja, near Goma, in 2013. These soldiers were a platoon of the Tanzanian Special Forces attached to Task Force Alpha.

- First contingent – The last elements were deployed by 7 October 2013.
- Second contingent – Reported to be relieved during April 2015, after a nine-month deployment.
- Third contingent – Due to be deployed in April 2015, 850 strong, under Lieutenant Colonel Blaise Saenda.
- Since 2014: No details known on subsequent rotations of this national unit

=== Command ===
The FIB was first headed by General James Aloizi Mwakibolwa of Tanzania. Mwakibolwa had had previous experience in the region. He served as commander of the Military Assessment Team of the International Conference on the Great Lakes Region (ICGLR) in October 2012 to assess the military situation in eastern Congo and come up with a concept of operations. Mwakibolwa handed over command to his successor in April 2014.

Brigade Commander

- 2013 – April 2014: Brigadier General James Aloizi Mwakibolwa (Tanzania) ,
- April 15, 2014 – Unknown: General Ramadhan Abdul Kimweri (Tanzania)
- 2015–c. 2016: Brigadier General Vincent Nundwe, (Malawi)
- May 2018 – Unknown: Brigadier General Patrick Njabulo Dube (South Africa)
- July 2020 – October 2021: Brigadier General Monwabisi Dyakopu (South Africa)
- Since October 2021: Unknown (Tanzania)

Deputy Brigade Commander

- 2014–2015: Colonel Dube (South Africa)
- 2015–2016: Colonel Mthetheleli Ncgulu (South Africa)
- 2016–2017: Colonel Monwabisi Dyakopu (South Africa)

== Actions ==
=== Engagement with M23 ===
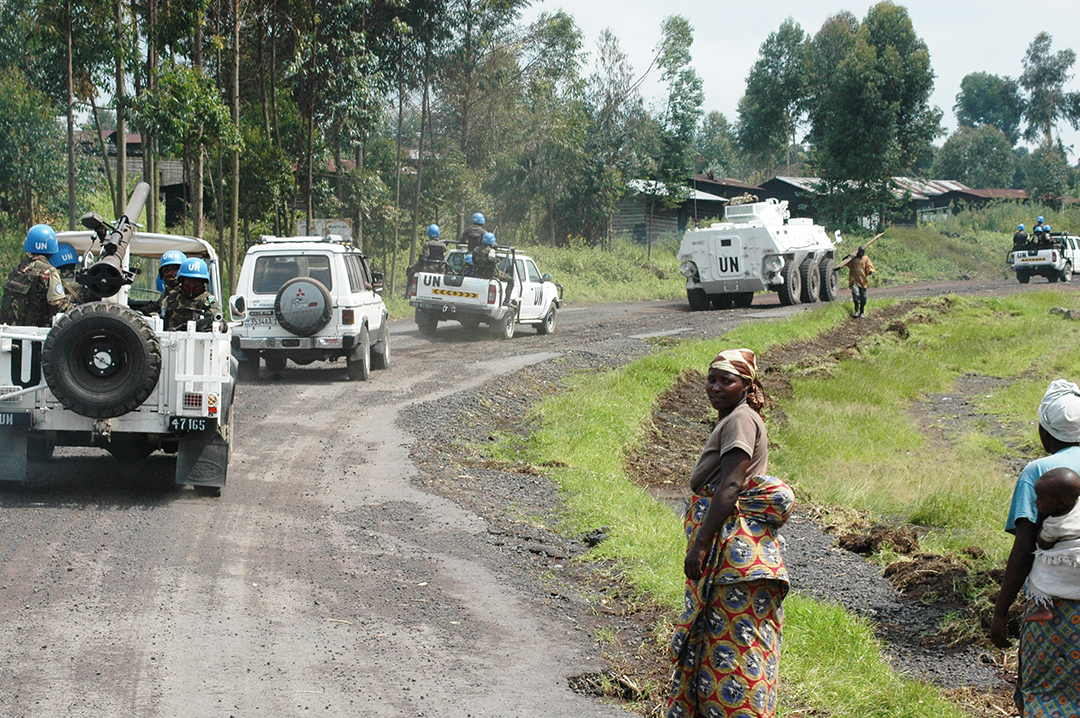
FIB vehicles outside Goma in October 2013 during the unit's counteroffensive against M23 rebels

In what is widely regarded as its greatest success, the Force Intervention Brigade played an important role in driving out the Rwanda-backed M23 rebel group in October 2013.

In the first week of engagement, South African and Tanzanian forces cleared Goma's surroundings.

This offensive came after intelligence reports said that, should the Kampala peace talks fail, the M23 would launch its own attacks. In response, the Force Intervention Brigade joined the FARDC to split the M23 forces and dislodge the group from its military strongholds across North Kivu. By surrounding the rebels from the western, southern and northern fronts, the combined forces of the FARDC and Force Intervention Brigade were able to push M23 out of all its previous strongholds in only four days. Notable engagements included battles at Kanyamahoro, Kiwanga, Rutshuru and Rumangabo. As a result of the offensive, the M23 rebels retreated into the Virunga Mountains on the border of Rwanda in what has been considered a crushing military loss for the rebel group. With the arrival of Malawian troops earlier that month to contribute to the Force Intervention Brigade, this operation also marked the first time that all components of the Force Intervention Brigade worked together.

Before the 27 October 2013 battles, some Rooivak helicopters and drones were seen, in an effort to augment the FIB forces against M23

The Indian Army Battalion assigned to act in a supporting role during the battle at Kiwanja/Rutsuru, refused to fight and sealed themselves into their armoured vehicles until the battle was over.

In August 2013, Near the Triple Towers area, near Kibati, a South African sniper took the then 6th longest shot in history, 2,125 metres (6,972 ft).

=== Engagement with ADF ===
Following this defeat of the M23 Movement, the Force Intervention Brigade specifically targeted another rebel group, the Allied Democratic Forces (ADF), in 2014. By March, 2014, it was MONUSCO forces the ones who assisted the FARDC, not the FIB, in conducting operations in a triangle formed between the axis of Beni, Kamango and the eastern boundary with South Irumu. THE AFD, mainly located on the border of Uganda and the DRC, was especially notorious for attacking Ugandans and Congolese civilians. The Force Intervention Brigade acted in this situation to destroy the bases of the ADF, and it was considered largely successful in this regard. However, in response to these efforts against the ADF, the ADF has specifically targeted UN officials and humanitarian aid workers in the region. In December 2017, 15 Tanzanian soldiers were killed when the ADF attacked their base.

=== Other engagements ===
In December 2014, media reports supported Human Rights Watch' contentions about massacres in the Beni, North Kivu region. Human Rights Watch claimed that unidentified rebels killed more than 180 civilians in the eastern Congo between September and December 2014. The FIB's non-engagement of these attackers has been severely criticised. The MONUSCO head, Martin Kobler, conceded that the FARDC has "little appetite" to carry out missions against these perpetrators.

Large-scale rebel attacks occurring nearly weekly have terrorized residents of Beni and left them uncertain where to seek safety. UN and Congolese forces need to urgently coordinate their efforts and improve protection of civilians in Beni.

— Ida Sawyer, senior Congo researcher

The Force Intervention Brigade was also involved in other combat engagements including:

- Kitchanga. In May 2014, SANDF soldiers were involved in an engagement with Alliance of Patriots for a Free and Sovereign Congo (APCLS) rebels and defended their position.
- Nyiabiondo/Lukweti

== Criticisms ==
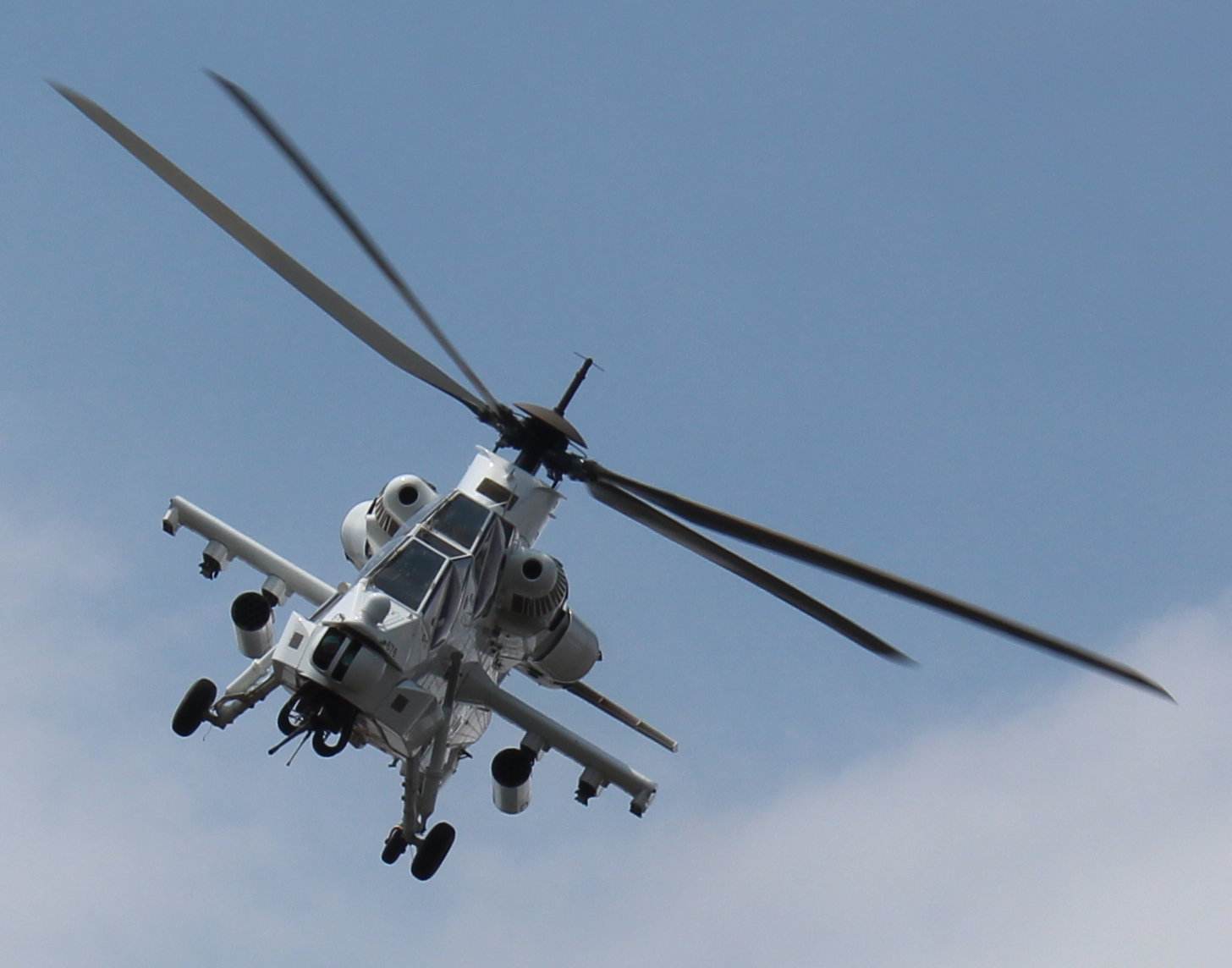
A South African Denel Rooivalk attack helicopter serving with the FIB, photographed in Sake in 2014

Given that the mandate names specific rebel groups such as the LRA, M23 Movement, and ADF as targets, the implementation of the Force Intervention Brigade has called the UN's principle of neutrality into question. This has sparked criticism of the Force Intervention Brigade, which some believe undermines one of the fundamental values of UN peacekeeping.

Some evidence also points to local civilian opposition to the presence of the Force Intervention Brigade. According to Teddy Muhindo Kataliko, president of the Civil Society in Beni Territory, "The population is very hostile to MONUSCO. Firstly because so many people are being killed, but even more so seeing all their arsenal, logistics and soldiers in the area." This opposition stems from the civilian deaths caused by the Force Intervention Brigade, as well as the failure of the Brigade to eliminate most rebel groups despite long-term presence in the region.

Furthermore, scholars warn that the implementation of the Force Intervention Brigade under the larger MONUSCO mandate may be blurring the line between peace enforcement and peacekeeping. As a result, rebel groups may begin to target UN peacekeeping officials as well as humanitarian aid workers, even those who are not involved in the Force Intervention Brigade component of the MONUSCO mission. This may make it increasingly difficult for humanitarian aid to be distributed to civilians.

The Congolese government has also indicated an increasing desire to remove UN troops from the country. Specifically, Foreign Minister Raymond Tshibanda indicated in 2016 that the DRC would like the UN to cut its 20,000 strong MONUSCO peacekeeping force in half. While Tshibanda noted that the Congo did not want a "hasty" withdrawal of peacekeeping troops, he also stated that he was "not willing to compromise on the sovereignty of our country."

== Incidents and casualties ==
- 28 August 2013: Major Khatibu Shaaban Mshindo of the Tanzanian battalion was killed by mortar fire from the M23 militia group near Kibati Hills, just outside Goma. A memorial service was held by members of the brigade to honour his passing. Three Tanzanians and two South Africans were also wounded in the same incident. Private Hugo Barnabas Munga of the Tanzanian battalion died of his wounds in Pretoria on 18 September 2013.
- 18 September 2013: Private Hugo Barnabas Munga of the Tanzanian battalion died of his wounds in Pretoria
- 27 October 2013: Lieutenant Rajabu Ahmed Mlima, of the Tanzanian Army Special Forces, was killed in action on Govender's Hill, just east of the town of Kiwanja. He was part of the Quick Reaction Force of Task Group Alpha of the Brigade. He was killed during a fire-fight between elements of M23 and the combined South African and Tanzanian QRF.
- 5 May 2015: Two Tanzanian peacekeepers were killed in an ambush by what were assumed to be Allied Democratic Forces rebels. The attack took place near the village of Kikiki, some 50 kilometres (31 mi) north of Beni in North Kivu province. A later newspaper article raises doubts over the identification of the alleged attackers and suggests the Tanzanians may have been killed by Congolese armed forces, FARDC. The article goes on to suggest that a Malawian soldier killed later (see below) died as a consequence of FARDC inaction.
- November 2015: During November 2015 a Malawian peacekeeper, Staff Sergeant Dyson Mayao, was killed in a rebel attack.
- 18 December 2016: Mai Mai militia attacked a small South African detachment at Butembo, killing Rifleman Moalosi Albert Mokhothu and wounding two other South Africans. Four Mai Mai were killed and two captured.
- 17 September 2017: 'Late 2017 saw an increase in attacks on the Force Intervention Brigade which was largely blamed on 'presumed Allied Democratic Forces' (ADF). On 17 September one Tanzanian soldier was killed and a second wounded in an attack by 'presumed ADF' on a UN base in Beni territory. The soldier killed was later identified as Private Mussa Jumanne Muryery.
- 25 September 2017: A soldier from Malawi, who was deployed with the Force Intervention Brigade, died from a self-inflicted gunshot wound.
- 9 October 2017: Another attack on the UN force by rebels occurred, 24 kilometres (15 mi) from Beni, in which up to 18 peacekeepers were injured. Two Tanzanian soldiers, Corporal Maselino Paschal Fabusi and Private Venance Moses Chimboni, were killed.
- 27 October 2017: Private (Ms) Nomathemba Ngeleka of 5 South African Infantry Battalion, a soldier from South Africa, was murdered by a fellow soldier who then attempted to take his own life but was unsuccessful.
- 7 December 2017: Suspected ADF elements conducted an unprecedentedly large and co-ordinated attack against a MONUSCO Company Operating Base at Semuliki in Beni territory, North Kivu. The attack led to protracted fighting that left 14 Tanzanian peacekeepers dead, five FARDC personnel dead, one Tanzanian soldier missing and 53 wounded. One report stated that 72 rebels were killed in the fighting.
- 3 September 2018: An attack on South African troops at Ngadi in the Beni area saw two wounded and a South African Air Force Oryx helicopter hit by gunfire and damaged. The attackers were reported to be ADF.
- 14 November 2018: A combined offensive by FIB and FARDC elements against the ADF saw clashes in the Beni area, North Kivu, in which six soldiers of the Malawi battalion and one Tanzanian soldier were killed. A further eight Malawian FIB personnel were reported wounded, with up to four reported missing. One of the missing Malawi soldiers, Corporal George Salim, later made his way back to safety but three others were reported to be missing: Sergeant Chancy Mwakalenga, Sergeant Boniface Noah and Lance-Corporal Gift Nkhoma. The Malawian dead were Lieutenant Aubrey Kachemwe, Private Chauncy Chitete and Private Benjamin Nsongela (all from Moyale Barracks, Mzuzu), Corporal Jonathan Kapichiri (Parachute Battalion, Salima), Private Simplex Taferakoso (Changalume Barracks, Zomba), and Sergeant Steven Kambalame (Malawi Armed Forces College, Salima). Six of the eight hospitalised Malawians were named as: Sergeant Dan Chilanje, Corporal Malijani Selo, Lance-Corporal Wesley Mautanga, Private Anthony Mwamadi, Private Moses Mdala and Private Damson Nkhoma.
- 5 February 2023: Flight Engineer, Sergeant Vusi Mabena, dies of wounds received from ground fire at his Oryx Helicopter. The Aircraft Commander, Major Omolemo Matlapang, suffered a serious shoulder wound. Co-pilot Captain Mathew Allan flew the helicopter safely to base, where a single bullet hole was noticed in the right-hand windscreen.

== Exit strategy ==
The UN is now looking towards an exit strategy to reduce its peacekeeping presence in the Democratic Republic of the Congo. In 2016, through Security Council Resolution 2277, the UN called for a commitment to the “gradual and progressive” reduction of the MONUSCO mission at large, which was enforced in its 2017 reduction of the troop ceiling from 19,815 to 16,215. The March 2018 UN investigation report of the Beni attack highlighted the need for better regional coordination and improvements in command determination and initiative.

== Legacy ==
The use of force had previously been authorized in peacekeeping operations such as UNAMSIL in Sierra Leone, UNAMID in Sudan, and UNPROFOR in the former Yugoslavia. However, the Force Intervention Brigade marks the first targeted offensive of the UN. As outlined in its mandate, the Force Intervention Brigade specifically condemns the M23 movement, the Lord’s Resistance Army, the Democratic Forces for the Liberation of Rwanda, Uganda's Allied Democratic Forces, as well as “all other armed groups and their continuing violence and abuses of human rights.” It calls for military action to be taken to "neutralise and disarm" these groups. Specifically targeting these groups as threats to civil security, the Force Intervention Brigade mandate marks a clear divergence from the scope of duties of previous UN Peacekeeping mandates, which have historically called for the complete neutrality of peacekeepers. Moreover, it marks an important shift for the MONUSCO mission, and the UN at large, towards peace enforcement rather than peacekeeping alone.

Notably, however, the UN is cautious to view the successes and failures of the Force Intervention Brigade as expectations for future missions in different regions. While it is the first mission of its kind, the mandate of the Force Intervention Brigade stresses that it is not intended to establish “a precedent or any prejudice to the agreed principles of peacekeeping.” Still, UN peace-enforcement mandates now exist outside of the Congo, in missions including Mali's MINUSMA and the Central African Republic's MINUSCA.

== See also ==
- African Union-led Regional Task Force
- African Union Mission in Somalia
- African Union/United Nations hybrid mission in Darfur
- Multinational Joint Task Force
- Southern African Development Community Mission in Mozambique (SAMIM)
- Operation BEKPA 2 - MINUSCA offensive operation
