= Kur Bolagh-e Sofla =

Kur Bolagh-e Sofla (Persian: كوربلاغ سفلی) may refer to:

- Kur Bolagh-e Yek
- Patiabad, Kermanshah
