= Zangelan (disambiguation) =

Zangelan or Zangilan may refer to:

In Azerbaijan:

- Zangilan, a town that is located in the Zangilan District of Azerbaijan
- Zangilan (village), a village that is located in the Zangilan District of Azerbaijan
- Zangilan District, an administrative territorial entity in the south-western part of the Republic of Azerbaijan

In Iran:

- Zangelan, Iran (disambiguation)
