= Igdalu =

Igdalu may refer to:

- Igdalu, Armenia
- Igdalu, Iran (disambiguation)
