= Nalband =

Nalband may refer to:

- Nalband, Armenia
- Nalband, Iran (disambiguation)
- Nalbant, Romania
- Nalband (tribe), Indian Muslim community

== See also ==
- Nalban metro station, Kolkata, India
