= Abbas Bolaghi =

Abbas Bolaghi (Persian: عباس بلاغي) may refer to:

- Abbas Bolaghi, Chaypareh
- Abbas Bolaghi, Shahin Dezh
