= Nalband, Iran =

Nalband (Persian: نعلبند) in Iran may refer to:

- Nalband, Gilan
- Nalband, Kermanshah
- Nalband, West Azerbaijan
