= Kura Bolagh, Chaypareh =

Kura Bolagh كورابلاغ
- Village
- Location within Iran
- Coordinates: 38°48′22″N 45°07′04″E
- Country: Iran
- Province: West Azerbaijan
- County: Chaypareh
- Bakhsh: Hajjilar
- Rural District: Hajjilar-e Jonubi

Population (2006)
  - Total: 100
- Time zone: UTC+3:30 (IRST)
  - Summer (DST): UTC+4:30 (IRDT)

Kura Bolagh (Persian: كورابلاغ, also Romanized as Kūrā Bolāgh; also known as Kūr Bolāgh and Kūreh Bolagh) is a village in Hajjilar-e Jonubi Rural District, Hajjilar District, Chaypareh County, West Azerbaijan Province, Iran. At the 2006 census, its population was 100, in 14 families.
