= Shekar Bolaghi =

Shekar Bolaghi (Persian: شكربلاغي) may refer to:

- Shekar Bolaghi-ye Olya
- Shekar Bolaghi-ye Sofla
