= Kamelabad =

Kamelabad (Persian: كامل اباد) may refer to:

- Kamelabad, East Azerbaijan
- Kamelabad, West Azerbaijan

== See also ==
- Kamalabad (disambiguation)
