= Hajjilar, West Azerbaijan =

City in West Azerbaijan province, Iran

Hajjilar Persian: حاجيلار
- City
- Location within Iran
- Coordinates: 38°51′59″N 45°05′40″E
- Country: Iran
- Province: West Azerbaijan
- County: Chaypareh
- District: Hajjilar
- Established as a city: 2017

Population (2016)
  - Total: 1,394
- Time zone: UTC+3:30 (IRST)

Hajjilar (Persian: حاجيلار) (Note: Also Romanized as Hājī Lār, Ḩājjīlār, and Ḩājjīlar; also known as Ḩājalār) is a city in, and the capital of, Hajjilar District in Chaypareh County, West Azerbaijan province, Iran. It also serves as the administrative center for Hajjilar-e Jonubi Rural District. (Note: Formerly Hajjilar Rural District)

== Demographics ==
=== Population ===
At the time of the 2006 National Census, Hajjilar's population was 1,291 in 370 households, when it was a village in Hajjilar Rural District (Note: Renamed Hajjilar-e Jonubi Rural District) of the former Chaypareh District in Khoy County. The following census in 2011 counted 1,560 people in 428 households, by which time the district had been separated from the county in the establishment of Chaypareh County. The rural district was transferred to the new Hajjilar District and renamed Hajjilar-e Jonubi Rural District. Hajjilar was transferred to Hajjilar-e Shomali Rural District created in the same district. The 2016 census measured the population of the village as 1,394 people in 434 households. It was the most populous village in its rural district.

After the census, Hajjilar was converted to a city.
