= Ideluy =

Ideluy (Persian: ايدلوي), also rendered as Igdalu or Idehlu, may refer to various places in Iran:

- Ideluy-e Olya
- Ideluy-e Sofla
