= Bistan =

Bistan or Beistan (Persian: بيستان) may refer to:

- Bistan, Chaypareh, West Azerbaijan Province, Iran
- Bistan, Poldasht, West Azerbaijan Province, Iran
- Bistan, a rebel corporal in the 2016 film Rogue One: A Star Wars Story
