= Bastam Citadel =

Urartian citadel in Iran

Coordinates: 38°53′N 44°57′E

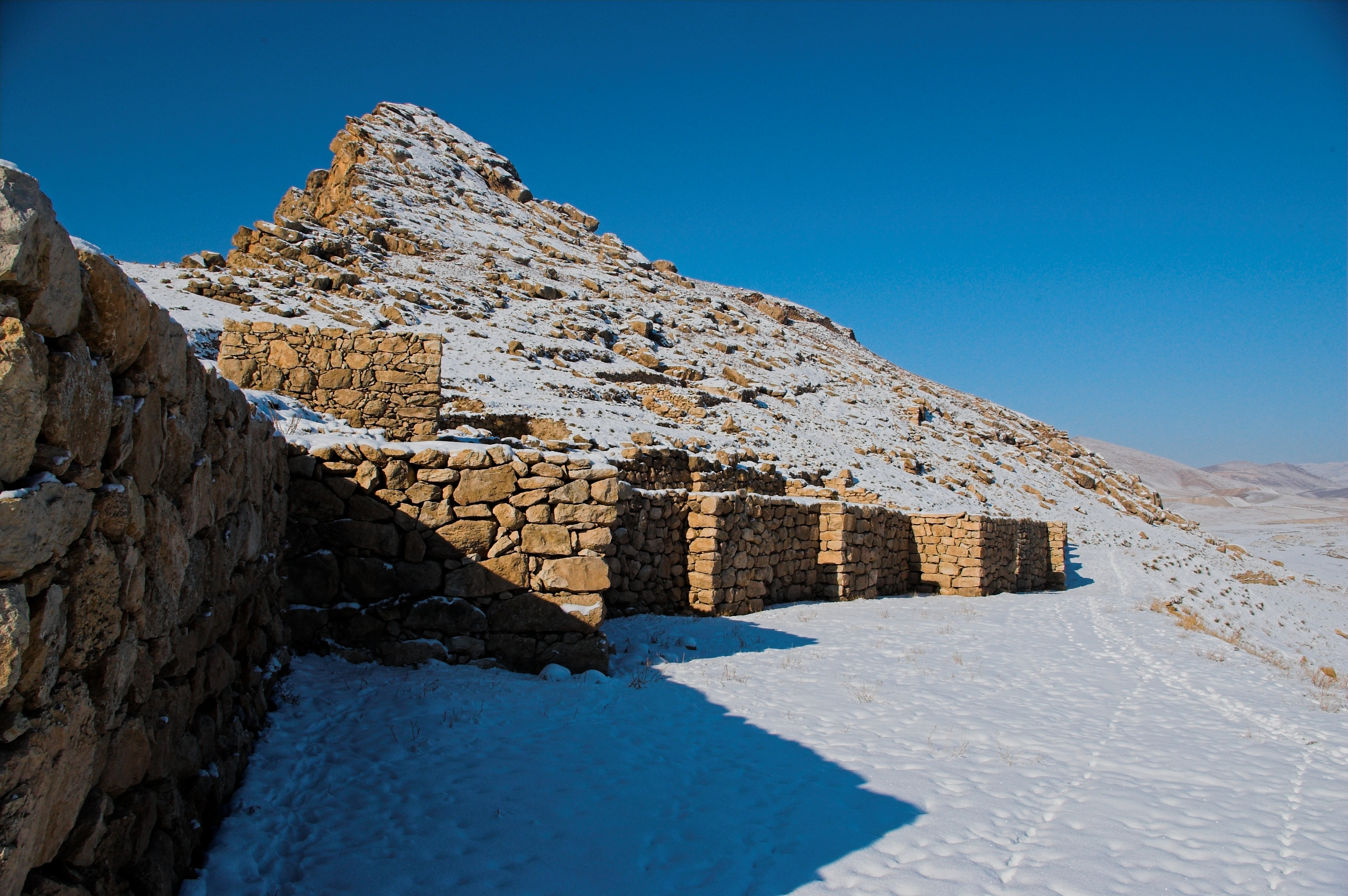
Bastam Citadel in Chaypareh County

Bastam (Persian: بسطام), also called Rusaipatari, is the site of an ancient Urartian citadel from ca. the 7th century BC, located near the village of Bastam, West Azerbaijan province, Iran.

== Sources ==
- Kleiss, Wolfram (1977). Bastam/Rusa-i-Uru.Tur: Beschreibung der urartäischen und mittelalterlichen Ruinen. Berlin: Reimer.
- Kleiss, Wolfram (1979–1988). Bastam. Ausgrabungen in den Urartäischen Anlagen. 2 volumes. Berlin: Mann, ISBN 3-7861-1203-7 (volume 1), ISBN 3-7861-1337-8 (volume 2).
- Kleiss, Wolfram (1989). "BESṬĀM (2)". Encyclopaedia Iranica, Vol. IV, Fasc. 2. pp. 175–177.
- Kleiss, Wolfram (2008). "URARTU IN IRAN". Encyclopaedia Iranica.
