= Kamelabad, East Azerbaijan =

Kamelabad کامل‌آباد
- Village
- Location within Iran
- Coordinates: 37°22′53″N 46°19′34″E
- Country: Iran
- Province: East Azerbaijan
- County: Maragheh
- Bakhsh: Central
- Rural District: Sarajuy-ye Shomali

Population (2006)
  - Total: 637
- Time zone: UTC+3:30 (IRST)
  - Summer (DST): UTC+4:30 (IRDT)

Kamelabad (Persian: کامل‌آباد, also Romanized as Kāmelābād) is a village in Sarajuy-ye Shomali Rural District, in the Central District of Maragheh County, East Azerbaijan Province, Iran. At the 2006 census, its population was 637, in 150 families.

== Notable people ==
Here is a list of renowned people with ancestry connection to Kamelabad village.

=== Alireza Mahmoudi Kamelabad ===
Alireza Mahmoudi Kamelabad is a researcher in the social robotics field in Stockholm. His grandfather, Chaparali Mahmoudi Kamelabad, was born in Kamelabad (1927), and raised there until his teenage years. Later together with his brothers, Baharali, Mirzaali, and Darvishali moved to the nearby city, Maragheh where Alireza's father, Mahmoud, was born. Alireza was born and raised in Tehran, until he moved to Italy in 2017.
