= United Nations Security Council Resolution 2098 =

UN Security Council Resolution 2098
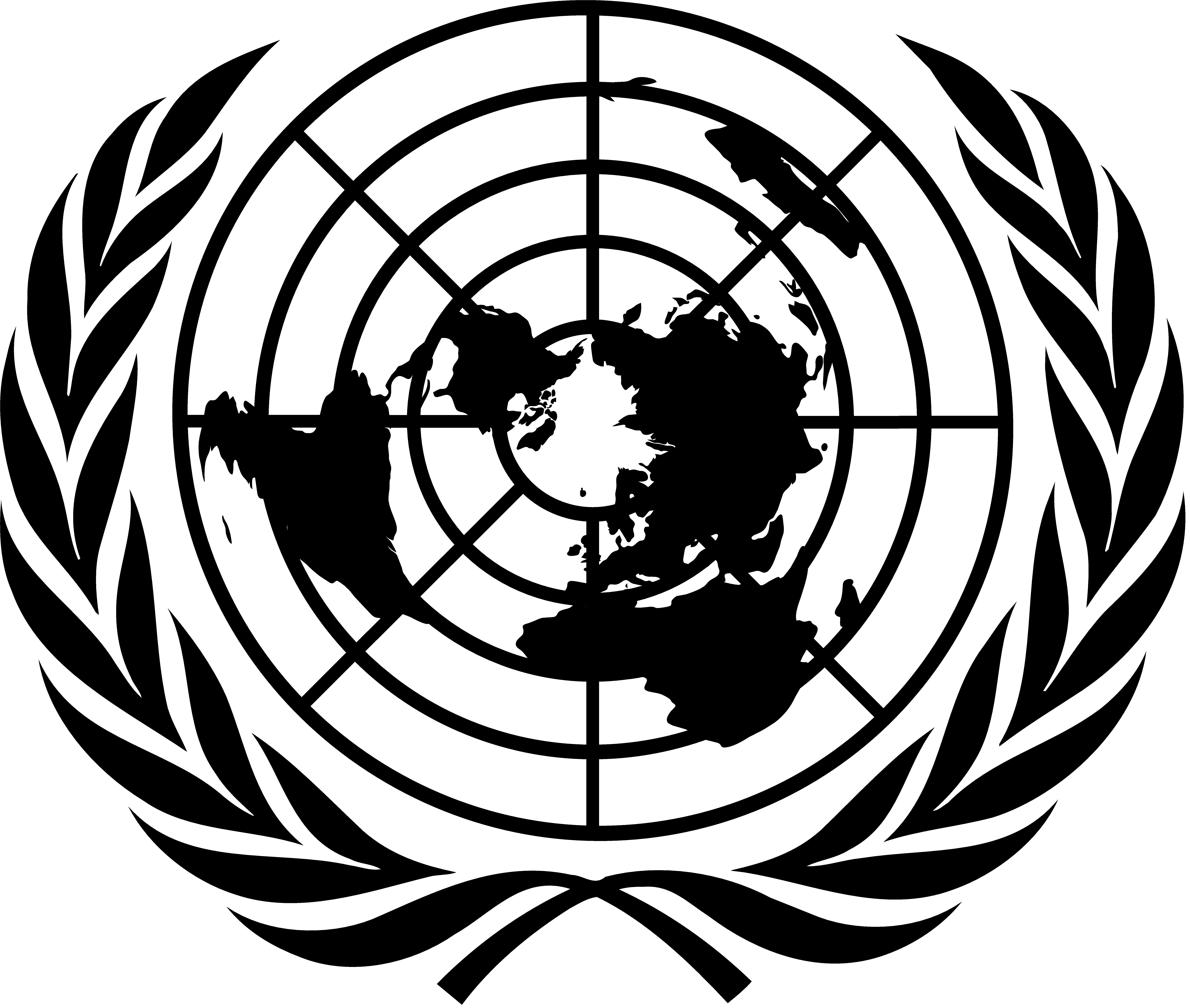
- UN emblem
- Date: 28 March 2013
- Meeting no.: 6943
- Code: S/RES/2098 (Document)
- Subject: extension of the mandate of the UN Organization Stabilization Mission in the Democratic Republic of the Congo
- Voting summary: 15 voted for; None voted against; None abstained
- Result: Adopted

Security Council composition
- Permanent members: China; France; Russia; United Kingdom; United States
- Non-permanent members: Argentina; Australia; Azerbaijan; Guatemala; South Korea; Luxembourg; Morocco; Pakistan; Rwanda; Togo

United Nations Security Council Resolution 2098 authorized the first-ever "offensive" force to "neutralize and disarm" rebels of the March 23 Movement (M23), by creating an intervention brigade from among the troops of the Stabilization Mission in the Democratic Republic of the Congo (MONUSCO).

== Resolution ==
After the brief capture of Goma, in the eastern Democratic Republic of the Congo, by rebels during the M23 rebellion in November 2012, the UN's peacekeeping mission, MONUSCO, was criticized for its inaction. This led the UN Security Council to pass Resolution 2098 to establish an intervention brigade (FIB) from among the nearly 20,000-strong mission to "neutralize negative forces". The resolution also extended the mandate of MONUSCO until 31 March 2014, and condemned M23, the Democratic Forces for the Liberation of Rwanda (FDLR), the Lord's Resistance Army (LRA), and all other groups committing human rights violations. The FIB began joint operations with the Armed Forces of the Democratic Republic of the Congo (FARDC) immediately, and in August 2013 it assisted them in retaking positions around Goma.

== See also ==
- List of United Nations Security Council Resolutions 2101 to 2200 (2013–2015)
