= James Aloizi Mwakibolwa =

Tanzanian military officer

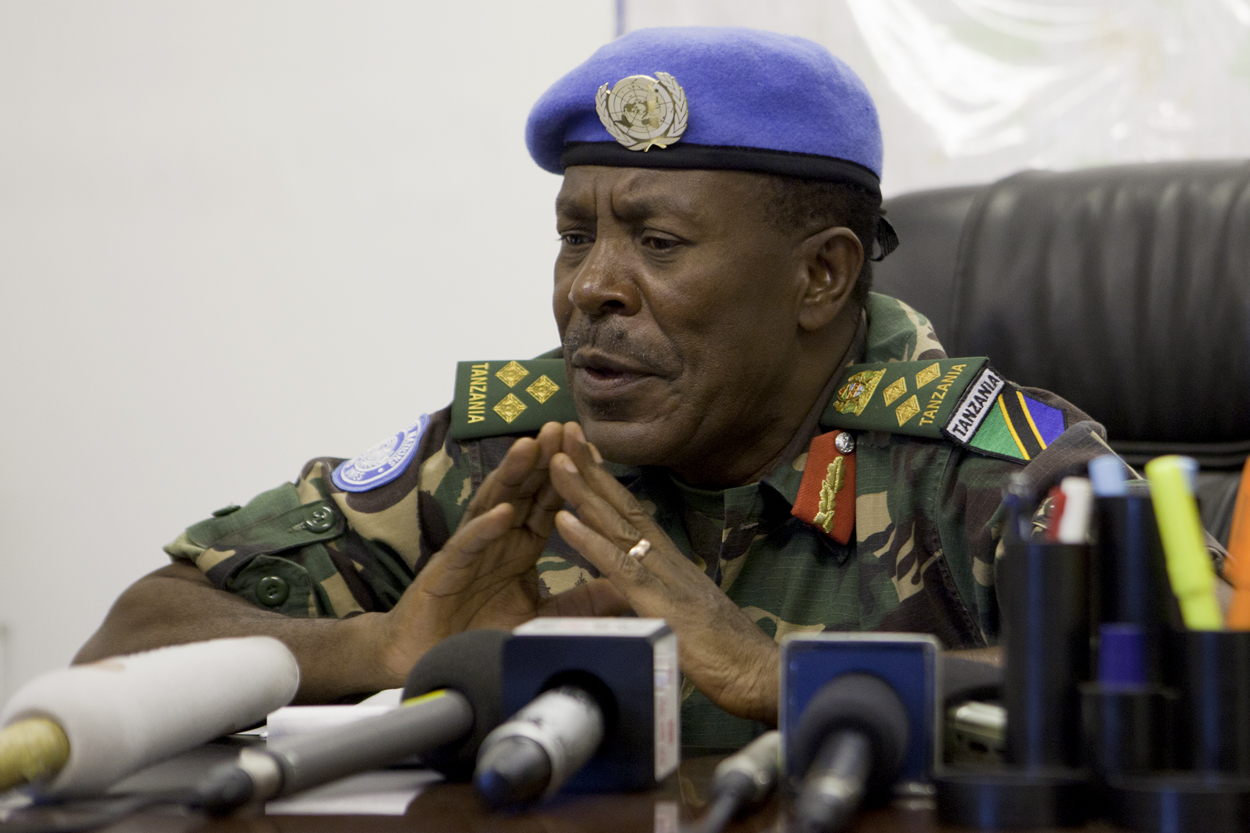
James Aloizi Mwakibolwa, photographed during a UN press conference in 2013

Lieutenant General James Aloizi Mwakibolwa is a Tanzanian military officer. He served as chief of staff of the Tanzania People's Defence Force (TPDF) between 2017 and 2018 and previously commanded the Force Intervention Brigade (FIB) of the United Nations' MONUSCO peacekeeping mission in the Democratic Republic of the Congo between 2013 and 2014. His command encompassed the M23 rebellion and Mwakibolwa was personally credited with making an important contribution to the defeat of the M23 rebels in Kivu Province.

Mwakibolwa served in the TPDF for over 30 years. Before receiving the command of the FIB, he served as commander of the Military Assessment Team of the International Conference on the Great Lakes Region (ICGLR) in October 2012 to assess the military situation in the Eastern Congo.

The FIB, of which Mwakibolwa was the first commander as brigadier general, is a military formation which forms part of the MONUSCO mission. During Mwakibolwa tenure, MONUSCO was under the command of Carlos Alberto dos Santos Cruz. The FIB was authorized by the United Nations Security Council on 28 March 2013 through United Nations Security Council Resolution 2098 and was the first UN peacekeeping formation specifically tasked to carry out offensive operations to neutralize armed groups that threaten State authority and civilian security. After the end of his mandate in April 2014, Mwakibolwa returned to Tanzania with his contingent of Tanzanian soldiers. He served as chief of staff of the TPDF from 2017 to 2018 and received a promotion to lieutenant-general.
