= Wolfram Kleiss =

German archaeologist (1930–2020)

Wolfram Kleiss (1930–2020) was a German archaeologist who spent many years of his life in Iran researching and excavating archaeology.

== Biography ==
He was director of the German Archaeological Institute in Tehran. He retired in 1995, and died in 2020 at the age of 90.

== Research ==
He received a research grant from the German Archaeological Institute in 1959 and travelled to Iran for the first time. In 1971–1986, he was director of the institute's Tehran branch and in Iran during the 1970s and 1980s, directed accomplished archaeological explorations in Takht-e Soleymān, Masjid Soleymān, Bastam, and Bisotun with a team of archaeologist from Iran.

He was a member of the German Archaeological Institute, and with his colleague Stephan Kroll he travelled extensively to Iran, visiting over 1000 archaeological sites.

Between 1969 and 1978, Kleiss excavated the Urartian fortress at Bastam in co-operation with a team of archaeologists from Iran, Germany, Italy, Canada, and the United States.

Also, from 1967 to 1979, Kleiss conducted archaeological surveys in northwestern Iran and published the results in a series of articles, according to the National Museum of Iran, covering not only Urartian remains, but all periods from the Neolithic onwards.

== Publications ==
His publications—comprising more than 300 works—cover the vast topics of architecture and urbanism in Iran. Among his books History of the Architecture of Iran, Caravanserais of Iran; Bīsutūn, History, and History of Research 1963–1967 and Bastam/Rusa-i Uru.Tur are more notable.

His book History of Iranian Architecture (Archaeology in Iran and Turan) was published in 2018.
