= Kamalabad-e Shahabiyeh =

Kamalabad-e Shahabiyeh كمال آباد شهابيه
- Village
- Location within Iran
- Coordinates: 35°15′05″N 47°38′49″E
- Country: Iran
- Province: Kurdistan
- County: Qorveh
- Bakhsh: Serishabad
- Rural District: Yalghuz Aghaj

Population (2006)
  - Total: 180
- Time zone: UTC+3:30 (IRST)
  - Summer (DST): UTC+4:30 (IRDT)

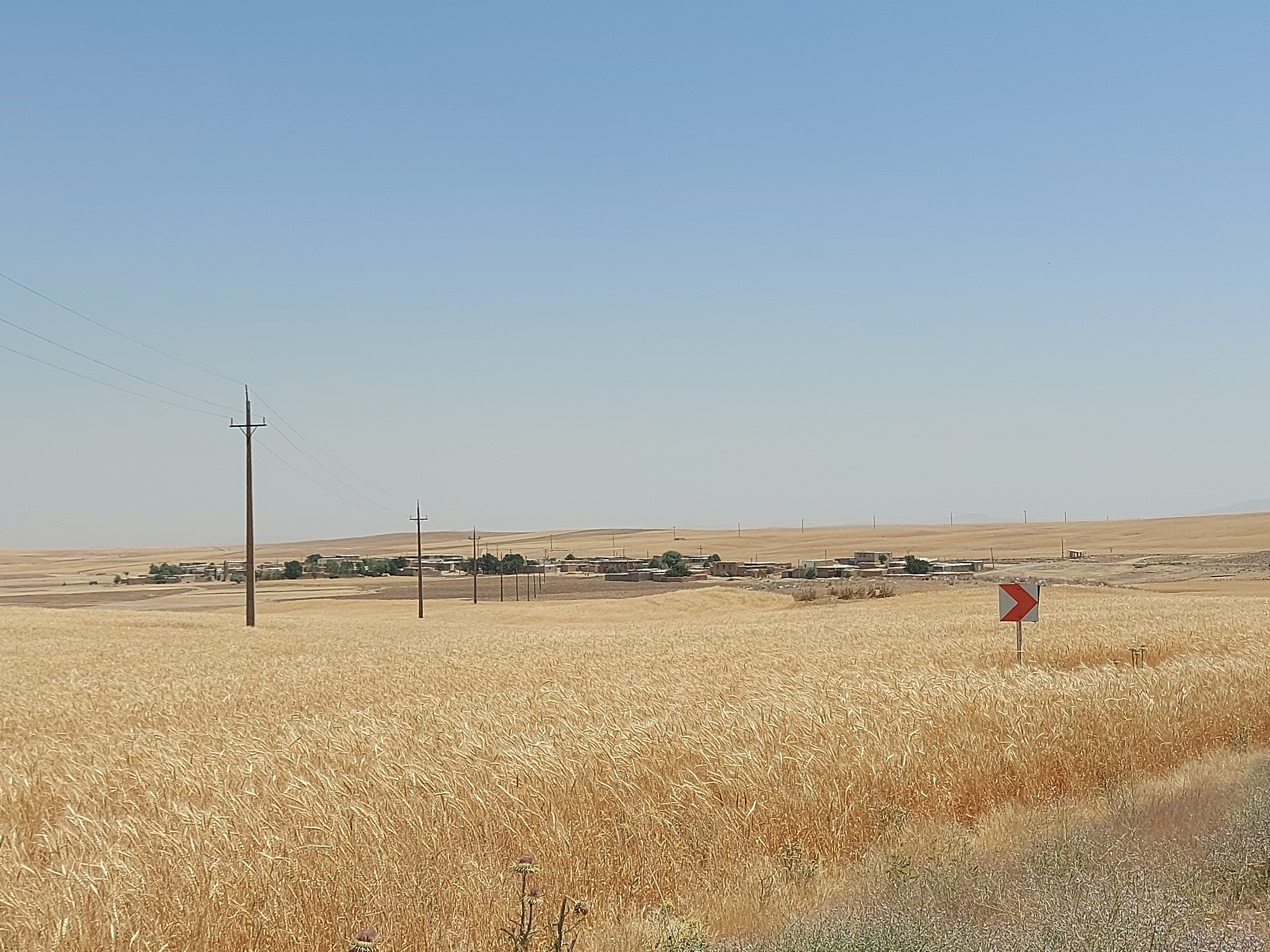
Kamalabad Shahabi village and surrounding farms

Kamalabad-e Shahabiyeh (Persian: كمال آباد شهابيه, also Romanized as Kamālābād-e Shahābīyeh; also known as Kamālābād) is a village in Yalghuz Aghaj Rural District, Serishabad District, Qorveh County, Kurdistan Province, Iran. At the 2006 census, its population was 180, in 42 families. The village is populated by Kurds.
