= Kamalabad, Beyza =

Kamalabad كمال اباد
- Village
- Location within Iran
- Coordinates: 30°05′10″N 52°31′12″E
- Country: Iran
- Province: Fars
- County: Sepidan
- Bakhsh: Beyza
- Rural District: Banesh

Population (2006)
  - Total: 267
- Time zone: UTC+3:30 (IRST)
  - Summer (DST): UTC+4:30 (IRDT)

Kamalabad (Persian: كمال اباد, also Romanized as Kamālābād; also known as Kamālābād Beyẕā) is a village in Banesh Rural District, Beyza District, Sepidan County, Fars province, Iran. At the 2006 census, its population was 267, in 58 families.
