= Hajji Ahmad Shahvazayi =

Hajji Ahmad Shahvazayi حاجي احمد شاهوزائي
- Village
- Location within Iran
- Coordinates: 31°01′03″N 61°48′58″E
- Country: Iran
- Province: Sistan and Baluchestan
- County: Hirmand
- Bakhsh: Central
- Rural District: Jahanabad

Population (2006)
  - Total: 145
- Time zone: UTC+3:30 (IRST)
  - Summer (DST): UTC+4:30 (IRDT)

Hajji Ahmad Shahvazayi (Persian: حاجي احمد شاهوزائي, also Romanized as Ḩājjī Aḩmad Shāhvazāyī; also known as Deh-e Ḩājj Aḩmad) is a village in Jahanabad Rural District, in the Central District of Hirmand County, Sistan and Baluchestan Province, Iran. At the 2006 census, its population was 145, in 26 families.
