= Kamalabad, Rafsanjan =

Kamalabad كمال اباد
- Village
- Location within Iran
- Coordinates: 30°41′34″N 55°53′55″E
- Country: Iran
- Province: Kerman
- County: Rafsanjan
- Bakhsh: Ferdows
- Rural District: Rezvan

Population (2006)
  - Total: 200
- Time zone: UTC+3:30 (IRST)
  - Summer (DST): UTC+4:30 (IRDT)

Kamalabad (Persian: كمال اباد, also Romanized as Kamālābād; also known as Kamālābād Nūq) is a village in Rezvan Rural District, Ferdows District, Rafsanjan County, Kerman Province, Iran. At the 2006 census, its population was 200, in 46 families.
