= Kamalabad-e Bala =

Kamalabad-e Bala كمال ابادبالا
- Village
- Location within Iran
- Coordinates: 34°22′06″N 49°44′24″E
- Country: Iran
- Province: Markazi
- County: Arak
- Bakhsh: Central
- Rural District: Mashhad-e Miqan

Population (2006)
  - Total: 50
- Time zone: UTC+3:30 (IRST)
  - Summer (DST): UTC+4:30 (IRDT)

Kamalabad-e Bala (Persian: كمال ابادبالا, also Romanized as Kamālābād-e Bālā; also known as Kamālābād-e ‘Olyā) is a village in Mashhad-e Miqan Rural District, in the Central District of Arak County, Markazi Province, Iran. At the 2006 census, its population was 50, in 16 families.
