= Kamalabad, Bardsir =

Kamalabad كمال اباد
- Village
- Location within Iran
- Coordinates: 30°00′05″N 56°30′47″E
- Country: Iran
- Province: Kerman
- County: Bardsir
- Bakhsh: Central
- Rural District: Mashiz

Population (2006)
  - Total: 466
- Time zone: UTC+3:30 (IRST)
  - Summer (DST): UTC+4:30 (IRDT)

Kamalabad (Persian: كمال اباد, also Romanized as Kamālābād) is a village in Mashiz Rural District, in the Central District of Bardsir County, Kerman Province, Iran. At the 2006 census, its population was 466, in 115 families.
