= Kamalabad, Baft =

Kamalabad كمال اباد
- Village
- Location within Iran
- Coordinates: 28°56′38″N 56°36′36″E
- Country: Iran
- Province: Kerman
- County: Baft
- Bakhsh: Central
- Rural District: Dashtab

Population (2006)
  - Total: 9
- Time zone: UTC+3:30 (IRST)
  - Summer (DST): UTC+4:30 (IRDT)

Kamalabad (Persian: كمال اباد, also Romanized as Kamālābād) is a village in Dashtab Rural District, in the Central District of Baft County, Kerman Province, Iran. At the 2006 census, its population was 9, in 4 families.
