= Yusef Kandi, Shahin Dezh =

Yusef Kandi يوسف كندي
- Village
- Location within Iran
- Coordinates: 36°53′29″N 46°26′26″E
- Country: Iran
- Province: West Azerbaijan
- County: Shahin Dezh
- Bakhsh: Keshavarz
- Rural District: Keshavarz

Population (2006)
  - Total: 381
- Time zone: UTC+3:30 (IRST)
  - Summer (DST): UTC+4:30 (IRDT)

Yusef Kandi (Persian: يوسف كندي, also Romanized as Yūsef Kandī and Yūsof Kandī) is a village in Keshavarz Rural District, Keshavarz District, Shahin Dezh County, West Azerbaijan Province, Iran. At the 2006 census, its population was 381, in 79 families.
