= Kur Bolagh-e Do =

Kur Bolagh-e Do كوربلاغ دو
- Village
- Location within Iran
- Coordinates: 34°28′12″N 46°49′30″E
- Country: Iran
- Province: Kermanshah
- County: Kermanshah
- Bakhsh: Central
- Rural District: Baladarband

Population (2006)
  - Total: 112
- Time zone: UTC+3:30 (IRST)
  - Summer (DST): UTC+4:30 (IRDT)

Kur Bolagh-e Do (Persian: كوربلاغ دو, also Romanized as Kūr Bolāgh-e Do; also known as Kūr Bolāgh-e Moḩammad Naqī and Kūr Bolāgh-e Moḩammad Taqī) is a village in Baladarband Rural District, in the Central District of Kermanshah County, Kermanshah Province, Iran. At the 2006 census, its population was 112, in 30 families.
