= Kureh Bolagh =

Kureh Bolagh كوره بلاغ
- Village
- Location within Iran
- Coordinates: 37°12′42″N 46°08′11″E
- Country: Iran
- Province: East Azerbaijan
- County: Malekan
- Bakhsh: Central
- Rural District: Gavdul-e Markazi

Population (2006)
  - Total: 196
- Time zone: UTC+3:30 (IRST)
  - Summer (DST): UTC+4:30 (IRDT)

Kureh Bolagh (Persian: كوره بلاغ, also Romanized as Kūreh Bolāgh; also known as Kūrā Bolāgh) is a village in Gavdul-e Markazi Rural District, in the Central District of Malekan County, East Azerbaijan Province, Iran. At the 2006 census, its population was 196, in 59 families.
