= Kamalabad-e Pain =

Kamalabad-e Pain كمال ابادپائين
- Village
- Location within Iran
- Coordinates: 34°20′26″N 49°43′57″E
- Country: Iran
- Province: Markazi
- County: Arak
- Bakhsh: Central
- Rural District: Mashhad-e Miqan

Population (2006)
  - Total: 280
- Time zone: UTC+3:30 (IRST)
  - Summer (DST): UTC+4:30 (IRDT)

Kamalabad-e Pain (Persian: كمال ابادپائين, also Romanized as Kamālābād-e Pā’īn; also known as Kamālābād-e Soflá) is a village in Mashhad-e Miqan Rural District, in the Central District of Arak County, Markazi Province, Iran. At the 2006 census, its population was 280, in 88 families.
