= Zangilan (village) =

Zəngilan
- Location within Azerbaijan
- Coordinates: 39°04′05.2″N 46°41′42.8″E
- Country: Azerbaijan
- District: Zangilan
- Time zone: UTC+4 (AZT)
  - Summer (DST): UTC+5 (AZT)

Zəngilan (Zangilan, formerly known as İçəri (Ichari)) is a village in the Zangilan District of Azerbaijan.
