= Qarah Zia ol Din =

City in West Azerbaijan province, Iran

Qarah Zia ol Din Persian: قره‌ضیاءالدین
- City
- Location within Iran
- Coordinates: 38°53′24″N 45°01′42″E
- Country: Iran
- Province: West Azerbaijan
- County: Chaypareh
- District: Central

Population (2016)
  - Total: 26,767
- Time zone: UTC+3:30 (IRST)

Qarah Zia ol Din (Persian: قره‌ضیاءالدین) (Note: Also known as Qarah Zia od Din, Qarah Ẕīā' od Dīn, Qareh Zeyā ed Dīn, Qareh Ẕīā' od Dīn, and Qareh Zīyā ’Eddīn; also known as Ghareh Ziya’ Oddin, Qaraziadin and Qara Zīa ud Dīn) is a city in the Central District of Chaypareh County, West Azerbaijan province, Iran, serving as capital of both the county and the district.

== Demographics ==
=== Population ===
At the time of the 2006 National Census, the city's population was 22,589 in 5,558 households, when it was capital of the former Chaypareh District in Khoy County. The following census in 2011 counted 23,769 people in 6,482 households, by which time the district had been separated from the county in the establishment of Chaypareh County. Qarah Zia ol Din was transferred to the new Central District as the county's capital. The 2016 census measured the population of the city as 26,767 people in 7,819 households.

== Geography and climate ==
Qarah Zia ol Din has a synoptic meteorological station (Chaypareh), at an elevation of 1,171 m (3,842 ft) above sea level. Based on observations during the 2000-2016 period, the city receives 312 mm (12.3 in) of precipitation annually, with spring as the wettest season and summer being the driest. Daily temperatures can reach 30 °C (86 °F) and higher in summer, with daily minimum around 20 °C (68 °F). In winter minimum temperatures are below the freezing point, and daily maximum is generally below 10 °C (50 °F). Relative humidity is highest in December and January and lowest from July to September.
