= Hajjilar-e Shomali Rural District =

Rural district in West Azerbaijan province, Iran

Hajjilar-e Shomali Rural District Persian: دهستان حاجیلار شمالی
- Rural District
- Location within Iran
- Coordinates: 38°56′N 45°07′E
- Country: Iran
- Province: West Azerbaijan
- County: Chaypareh
- District: Hajjilar
- Established: 2007
- Capital: Kamalabad

Population (2016)
  - Total: 2,579
- Time zone: UTC+3:30 (IRST)

Hajjilar-e Shomali Rural District (Persian: دهستان حاجیلار شمالی) is in Hajjilar District of Chaypareh County, West Azerbaijan province, Iran. Its capital is the village of Kamalabad.

== History ==
In 2007, Chaypareh District was separated from Khoy County in the establishment of Chaypareh County, which was divided into two districts of two rural districts each, with Qarah Zia od Din as its capital and only city at the time. Hajjilar-e Shomali Rural District was created in the new Hajjilar District.

== Demographics ==
=== Population ===
At the time of the 2011 census, the rural district's population was 2,652 inhabitants in 672 households. The 2016 census measured the population of the rural district as 2,579 in 693 households. The most populous of its 27 villages was Shirin Bolagh, with 653 people.

=== Other villages in the rural district ===
- Damdama
- Esmail Kahrizi
- Hoseynabad
- Mirza Hesam
- Pir Yadegar
- Taj Khatun
