= Churs Rural District =

Rural district in West Azerbaijan province, Iran

Churs Rural District Persian: دهستان چورس
- Rural District
- Location within Iran
- Coordinates: 38°49′N 44°59′E
- Country: Iran
- Province: West Azerbaijan
- County: Chaypareh
- District: Central
- Established: 1987
- Capital: Churs

Population (2016)
  - Total: 4,662
- Time zone: UTC+3:30 (IRST)

Churs Rural District (Persian: دهستان چورس) is in the Central District of Chaypareh County, West Azerbaijan province, Iran. Its capital is the village of Churs.

== Demographics ==
=== Population ===
At the time of the 2006 National Census, the rural district's population (as a part of the former Chaypareh District in Khoy County) was 4,995 in 1,242 households. There were 4,827 inhabitants in 1,427 households at the following census of 2011, by which time the district had been separated from the county in the establishment of Chaypareh County. The rural district was transferred to the new Central District. The 2016 census measured the population of the rural district as 4,662 in 1,434 households. The most populous of its 17 villages was Churs, with 2,081 people.

=== Other villages in the rural district ===
- Hamzian-e Sofla
- Khaneqah-e Churs
- Marqesheh
- Qanat-e Mirza Jalil
- Qarah Kahriz
