= Hajjilar-e Jonubi Rural District =

Rural district in West Azerbaijan province, Iran

Hajjilar-e Jonubi Rural District Persian: دهستان حاجیلار جنوبی
- Rural District
- Location within Iran
- Coordinates: 38°49′N 45°09′E
- Country: Iran
- Province: West Azerbaijan
- County: Chaypareh
- District: Hajjilar
- Established: 1987
- Capital: Hajjilar

Population (2016)
  - Total: 5,781
- Time zone: UTC+3:30 (IRST)

Hajjilar-e Jonubi Rural District (Persian: دهستان حاجیلار جنوبی), (Note: Formerly Hajjilar Rural District (دهستان حاجیلار)) is in Hajjilar District of Chaypareh County, West Azerbaijan province, Iran. It is administered from the city of Hajjilar.

== Demographics ==
=== Population ===
At the time of the 2006 National Census, the rural district's population (as Hajjilar Rural District of the former Chaypareh District in Khoy County) was 8,856 in 1,953 households. The following census in 2011 counted 6,031 inhabitants in 1,619 households, by which time the district had been separated from the county in the establishment of Chaypareh County. The rural district was transferred to the new Hajjilar District and renamed Hajjilar-e Jobubi Rural District. The 2016 census measured the population of the rural district as 5,781 in 1,657 households. The most populous of its 27 villages was Hajjilar (now a city), with 1,394 people.

=== Other villages in the rural district ===
- Allah Verdi Kandi
- Babelabad
- Beyg Darvish
- Hoseyn Beyglu
- Zangelan-e Sofla
