= Qarah Zia ol Din Rural District =

Rural district in West Azerbaijan province, Iran

Qarah Zia ol Din Rural District Persian: دهستان قره‌ضیاءالدین
- Rural District
- Location within Iran
- Coordinates: 38°53′N 44°51′E
- Country: Iran
- Province: West Azerbaijan
- County: Chaypareh
- District: Central
- Established: 1987
- Capital: Bastam

Population (2016)
  - Total: 7,503
- Time zone: UTC+3:30 (IRST)

Qarah Zia ol Din Rural District (Persian: دهستان قره‌ضیاءالدین) is in the Central District of Chaypareh County, West Azerbaijan province, Iran. Its capital is the village of Bastam.

== Demographics ==
=== Population ===
At the time of the 2006 National Census, the rural district's population (as a part of the former Chaypareh District of Khoy County) was 5,785 in 1,333 households. There were 5,927 inhabitants in 1,583 households at the following census of 2011, by which time the district had been separated from the county in the establishment of Chaypareh County. The rural district was transferred to the new Central District. The 2016 census measured the population of the rural district as 7,503 in 2,115 households. The most populous of its 35 villages was Qarah Kandi, with 2,141 people.

=== Other villages in the rural district ===
- Badaki
- Qanat-e Baqer Beyk
- Shurik
- Soluklu
