= Hajjilar District =

District in West Azerbaijan province, Iran

Hajjilar District Persian: بخش حاجیلار
- District
- Location within Iran
- Coordinates: 38°54′N 45°07′E
- Country: Iran
- Province: West Azerbaijan
- County: Chaypareh
- Established: 2007
- Capital: Hajjilar

Population (2016)
  - Total: 8,360
- Time zone: UTC+3:30 (IRST)

Hajjilar District (Persian: بخش حاجیلار) is in Chaypareh County, West Azerbaijan province, Iran. Its capital is the city of Hajjilar.

== History ==
In 2007, Chaypareh District was separated from Khoy County in the establishment of Chaypareh County, which was divided into two districts of two rural districts each, with Qarah Zia ol Din as its capital and only city at the time. The village of Hajjilar was converted to a city in 2017.

== Demographics ==
=== Population ===
At the time of the 2011 census, the district's population was 8,683 people in 2,291 households. The 2016 census measured the population of the district as 8,360 inhabitants in 2,350 households.

=== Administrative divisions ===
Hajjilar District Population
Administrative Divisions	2011	2016
Hajjilar-e Jonubi RD (Note: Formerly Hajjilar Rural District)	6,031	5,781
Hajjilar-e Shomali RD	2,652	2,579
Hajjilar (city) (Note: Became a city after the 2016 census)		
Total	8,683	8,360
RD = Rural District
