= Chaypareh District =

Former district in West Azerbaijan province, Iran

Chaypareh District Persian: بخش چایپاره
- Former District
- Location within Iran
- Coordinates: 38°51′N 45°00′E
- Country: Iran
- Province: West Azerbaijan
- County: Khoy
- Capital: Qarah Zia ol Din

Population (2006)
  - Total: 42,225
- Time zone: UTC+3:30 (IRST)

Chaypareh District (Persian: بخش چایپاره) is a former administrative division of Khoy County, West Azerbaijan province, Iran. Its capital was the city of Qarah Zia ol Din.

== History ==
In 2007, the district was separated from the county in the establishment of Chaypareh County.

== Demographics ==
=== Population ===
At the time of the 2006 census, the district's population was 42,225 in 10,086 households.

=== Administrative divisions ===
Chaypareh District Population
Administrative Divisions	2006
Churs RD	4,995
Qarah Zia ol Din RD	5,785
Hajjilar RD (Note: Renamed Hajjilar-e Jonubi Rural District)	8,856
Qarah Zia ol Din (city)	22,589
Total	42,225
RD = Rural District
