= Central District (Chaypareh County) =

District in West Azerbaijan province, Iran

Central District (Chaypareh County) Persian: بخش مرکزی شهرستان چايپاره
- District
- Location within Iran
- Coordinates: 38°52′N 44°54′E
- Country: Iran
- Province: West Azerbaijan
- County: Chaypareh
- Established: 2007
- Capital: Qarah Zia ol Din

Population (2016)
  - Total: 38,932
- Time zone: UTC+3:30 (IRST)

The Central District of Chaypareh County (Persian: بخش مرکزی شهرستان چايپاره) is in West Azerbaijan province, Iran. Its capital is the city of Qarah Zia ol Din.

== History ==
In 2007, Chaypareh District was separated from Khoy County in the establishment of Chaypareh County, which was divided into two districts of two rural districts each, with Qarah Zia ol Din as its capital and only city at the time.

== Demographics ==
=== Population ===
At the time of the 2011 census, the district's population was 34,523 people in 9,492 households. The 2016 census measured the population of the district as 38,932 inhabitants in 11,368 households.

=== Administrative divisions ===
Central District (Chaypareh County) Population
Administrative Divisions	2011	2016
Churs RD	4,827	4,662
Qarah Zia ol Din RD	5,927	7,503
Qarah Zia ol Din (city)	23,769	26,767
Total	34,523	38,932
RD = Rural District
