= Chaypareh County =

County in West Azerbaijan province, Iran

Chaypareh County Persian: شهرستان چایپاره
- County
- Location of Chaypareh County in West Azerbaijan province (top right, yellow)

- Location of West Azerbaijan province in Iran
- Coordinates: 38°51′N 45°00′E
- Country: Iran
- Province: West Azerbaijan
- Established: 2007
- Capital: Qarah Zia ol Din
- Districts: Central, Hajjilar

Population (2016)
  - Total: 47,292
- Time zone: UTC+3:30 (IRST)

Chaypareh County (Persian: شهرستان چایپاره) is in West Azerbaijan province, Iran. Its capital is the city of Qarah Zia ol Din.

== History ==
In 2007, Chaypareh District was separated from Khoy County in the establishment of Chaypareh County, which was divided into two districts of two rural districts each, with Qarah Zia ol Din as its capital and only city at the time. The village of Hajjilar was converted to a city in 2017.

== Demographics ==
=== Population ===
At the time of the 2011 census, the county's population was 43,206 people in 11,775 households. The 2016 census measured the population of the county as 47,292 in 13,718 households.

=== Administrative divisions ===
Chaypareh County's population history and administrative structure over two consecutive censuses are shown in the following table.

Chaypareh County Population
Administrative Divisions	2011	2016
Central District	34,523	38,932
Churs RD	4,827	4,662
Qarah Zia ol Din RD	5,927	7,503
Qarah Zia ol Din (city)	23,769	26,767
Hajjilar District	8,683	8,360
Hajjilar-e Jonubi RD (Note: Formerly Hajjilar Rural District)	6,031	5,781
Hajjilar-e Shomali RD	2,652	2,579
Hajjilar (city) (Note: Became a city after the 2016 census)		
Total	43,206	47,292
RD = Rural District

== See also ==
Media related to Chaypareh County at Wikimedia Commons
