= Bosco Ntaganda =

Rwandan war criminal (born 1973)

- Born: 5 November 1973 (age 52); Kiningi, Rwanda
- Other names: The Terminator; Jean Bosco Ntaganda
- Criminal charges: War crimes (13 counts); Crimes against humanity (5 counts)
- Criminal penalty: 30 years in prison Ordered to pay $30 million in restitution
- Criminal status: Incarcerated

Bosco Ntaganda (born 5 November 1973) is a Rwandan warlord and convicted war criminal. He was the former military chief of staff of the National Congress for the Defense of the People (CNDP), a Tutsi group that operated in the North Kivu province of the Democratic Republic of the Congo (DRC) during the first phases of the Kivu conflict. He is also a former member of the Rwandan Patriotic Front (RPF) and a veteran of the Rwandan Civil War, as well as an alleged former Deputy Chief of the General Staff of the Patriotic Forces for the Liberation of Congo (FPLC), the military wing of the Union of Congolese Patriots.

Until March 2013, he was wanted by the International Criminal Court (ICC) for the war crimes of enlisting and conscripting children under the age of fifteen and using them to participate actively in hostilities. Prior to his surrender, Ntaganda had been allegedly involved in the rebel group March 23 Movement, a military group based in eastern areas of the DRC. On 18 March 2013, Ntaganda voluntarily handed himself in to the U.S. Embassy in Rwanda, asking to be transferred to the ICC. On 22 March, he was taken into custody by the ICC. On 8 July 2019, the ICC convicted him of war crimes including rape, murder, recruitment of child soldiers and sexual slavery. He was subsequently sentenced to 30 years for crimes against humanity.

== Early life ==
Ntaganda was born in the small town of Kinigi, situated in the foothills of Rwanda's Virunga mountain range in the Musanze District. When he was a teenager, Ntaganda fled to Ngungu-Masisi in eastern DRC after attacks on his fellow ethnic Tutsis started taking place in Rwanda. He attended secondary school there but did not graduate; at the age of 17 he joined Rwandan Patriotic Front rebels in southern Uganda. At some point he acquired Congolese citizenship.

== Rwandan and Congolese military career ==
Ntaganda fought with the Rwandan Patriotic Army in the early 1990s and participated in the overthrow of the Hutu-led Rwandan government in 1994 following the Rwandan genocide. He subsequently joined the Patriotic Forces for the Liberation of Congo (FPLC), the military wing of the Union of Congolese Patriots (UPC), and became its chief of military operations. During this time, he is alleged to have been involved in numerous massacres and other serious human rights abuses. When Ntaganda was in charge of the UPC, he told child soldiers; "When you're a soldier, you get a woman for free. Everything is free."

In January 2005, Ntaganda was offered a position as a general in the Armed Forces of the Democratic Republic of Congo as part of a peace process, but he refused the offer. On 1 November 2005, a United Nations Security Council committee imposed a travel ban and asset freeze on him for violating an arms embargo.

In 2006, following conflicts within the UPC, he returned to North Kivu, his home province, and joined Laurent Nkunda's National Congress for the Defense of the People (CNDP). As of April 2008, he was believed to be living in the Masisi district of North Kivu, serving as the CNDP's chief of staff. The CNDP has since been incorporated into the regular Congolese armed forces and Ntaganda was acting as a General in the army, despite being wanted by the ICC.

In 2012, he was living openly in the city of Goma in the DRC, on Avenue des Tulipiés, about 100 yards from the Rwandan border.

According to DRC authorities, General Bosco Ntaganda had "crossed from Goma to the town of Gisenyi, Rwanda, twice in 2011, in March and again in September, despite the travel ban imposed on him." Congolese authorities reported that on both occasions Ntaganda had gone there to attend a burial, having sought official authorization to do so from his military hierarchy and from immigration authorities. Rwandan officials said that they have no objections to Ntaganda crossing the border. They claim that his status as a sanctioned individual "is not a Rwandan problem, but a Democratic Republic of the Congo problem", adding that "Bosco contributes to peace and security to the region, which converges with Rwanda's aims".

A United Nations group of experts reported in late 2011 that Ntaganda controlled the Mungwe and Fungamwaka mines, near Numbi, through the Great Lakes Mining Company, managed by Edson Musabarura. Ntaganda also derived profits from mineral exploitation at Nyabibwe, through his alliance with Colonel Saddam Ringo. At Rubaya, Ntaganda gained large revenues from taxation levied by "parallel" mine police. Ntaganda ordered his troops to intervene on behalf of Krall Metal Congo at Lueshe.

On 4 April 2012, it was reported that Ntaganda and 300 loyal troops defected from the DRC and clashed with government forces in the Rutshuru region north of Goma. On 11 April 2012, president Joseph Kabila called for Ntaganda's arrest. On 16 March 2013, Sultani Makenga's forces "seized control ... of the town of Kibumba ... Ntaganda and an estimated 200 fighters fled into the forest while hundreds of others crossed the border into Rwanda," including "about 300 uniformed M23 rebels loyal to Ntaganda."

== Indictment by the International Criminal Court ==
On 22 August 2006, a Pre-Trial Chamber of the ICC found that there were reasonable grounds to believe that Ntaganda bore individual criminal responsibility for war crimes committed by the FPLC between July 2002 and December 2003, and issued a warrant for his arrest. He was charged with the war crimes of enlisting and conscripting children under the age of fifteen and using them to participate actively in hostilities. The arrest warrant was originally issued under seal because the court decided that "public knowledge of the proceedings in this case might result in Bosco Ntaganda hiding, fleeing, and/or obstructing or endangering the investigations or the proceedings of the Court". In April 2008, the court ruled that circumstances had changed and unsealed the warrant.

On 18 March 2013, Ntaganda handed himself in to the U.S. embassy in Kigali, Rwanda, where he requested transfer to the International Criminal Court in The Hague. Though the reasons for his surrender are unknown it was speculated that he was either pressured to do so by Rwanda or feared infighting within the M23 movement and its military leader Sultani Makenga, which had recently militarily forced a faction around Jean-Marie Runiga Lugerero and Baudouin Ngaruye, which was allegedly connected to Ntaganda, to flee the DRC into Rwanda. Though Rwanda was not a signatory to the Rome Statute, the media speculated it would be forced to turn him over to the ICC. The U.S. also had listed him on its War Crimes Rewards Program. On 22 March, he was detained by the ICC. He made his first appearance before the ICC on 26 March. At his first appearance before the ICC in the Hague on 26 March 2013, Ntaganda denied his guilt.

== Trial ==
Ntaganda's trial at the ICC began on 3 September 2015. He pleaded not guilty to eighteen charges brought against him, including rape, murder, recruitment of child soldiers and sexual slavery of civilians. The trial was expected to last many months with the prosecution calling eighty witnesses, thirteen of them expert and the rest victims. Three of the witnesses were former child soldiers in Ntaganda's Patriotic Forces for the Liberation of Congo (FPLC).

On 8 July 2019 he was convicted on all 18 counts and on 7 November 2019 was sentenced to 30 years in prison, the longest sentence ever handed down by the ICC. He is the first person to be convicted of sexual slavery by the ICC.

On 8 March 2021 the ICC ruled that Ntaganda's victims should be compensated with USD $30 million, the highest amount ever awarded. Since Ntaganda does not have the money to pay, the Court will use its own funds to compensate victims. Ntaganda subsequently appealed his conviction. On 30 March 2021, the ICC Appeals Chamber rejected his appeal and confirmed the conviction.

Ntaganda was transferred to Leuze-en-Hainaut prison in Belgium on 14 December 2022 to serve the remainder of his sentence.

== See also ==
- Bertrand Bisimwa
- Sultani Makenga
- Jean-Marie Runiga Lugerero
- Ratko Mladic
