= M23 rebellion (2012–2013) =

2012–2013 conflict in the DRC

Coordinates: 1.6038°S 29.1953°E

First M23 rebellion
- Part of the Kivu conflict
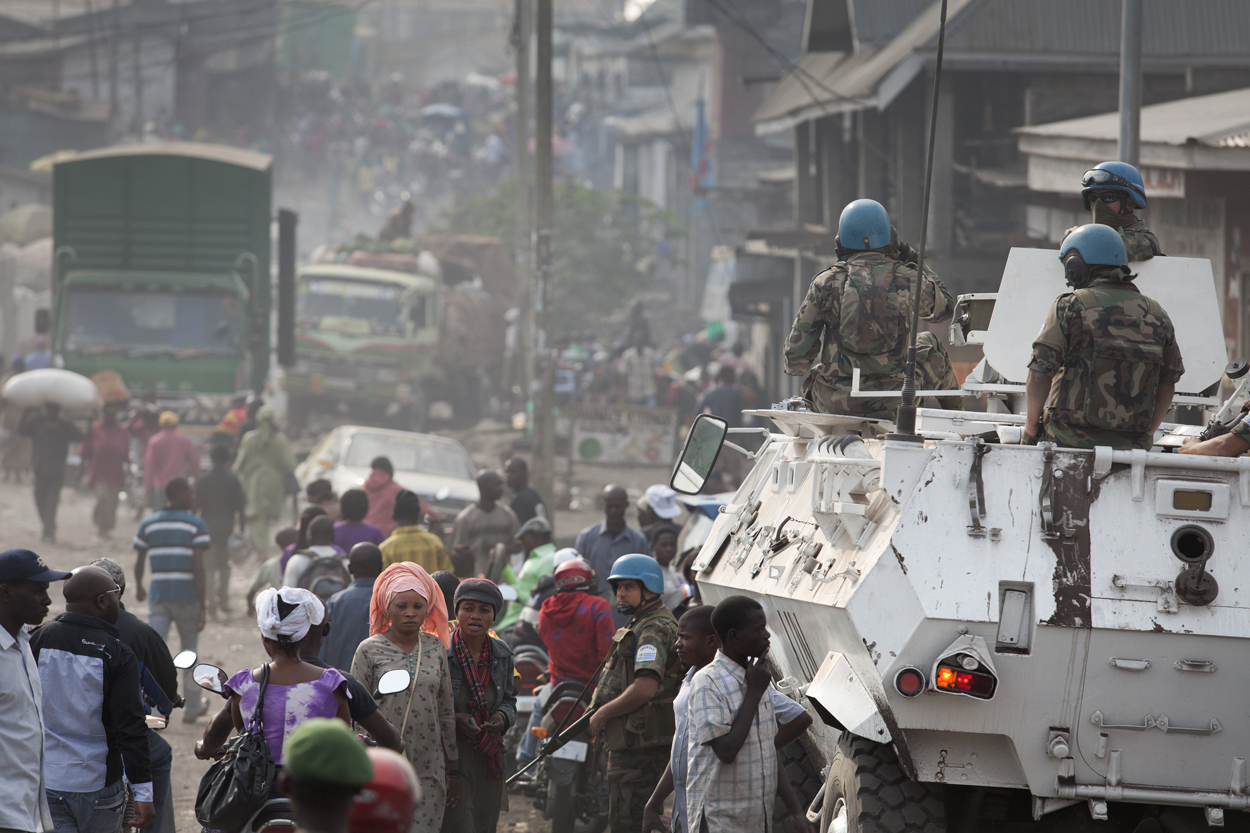
- United Nation forces and refugees in Goma during the rebellion Map of the initial phase of the rebellion
Date	4 April 2012 – 7 November 2013 (1 year, 7 months and 3 days)
Location	North Kivu, Democratic Republic of the Congo
Result	Congolese government victory; M23 disarms and demobilises

Belligerents
Democratic Republic of the Congo; (United Nations) MONUSCO; (United Nations) Force Intervention Brigade; South Africa; Tanzania; Malawi	March 23 Movement; Alleged support: Uganda; Rwanda

Commanders and leaders
(Democratic Republic of the Congo) Joseph Kabila; (Democratic Republic of the Congo) Lucien Bahuma; (United Nations) Santos Cruz; (United Nations) Bansi Ponnappa; (United Nations) James Aloizi Mwakibolwa	Bertrand Bisimwa; Sultani Makenga (POW); Bosco Ntaganda (POW)

Strength
(United Nations) (South Africa) 1,345 (United Nations) (Tanzania) 1,247	6,000 men (2012)

Casualties and losses
(Democratic Republic of the Congo) 200 killed; (United Nations) 3 killed; (South Africa) 5 wounded; (Tanzania) 1 killed, 1 wounded	962 killed
- Civilian casualties: 283+ killed 140,000 displaced.

The First M23 rebellion was an armed conflict in North Kivu, Democratic Republic of the Congo, that occurred between the March 23 Movement (M23) rebel group and Congolese government forces between 4 April 2012 and 7 November 2013. It ended when a peace agreement was made among eleven African nations, and the M23 troops surrendered in Uganda. The rebellion was part of continued fighting in the region after the formal end of the Second Congo War in 2003. The conflict reignited in late 2021 after M23 rebel leader Sultani Makenga and 100 rebel fighters attacked the border town of Bunagana but failed. A few months later, M23 rebels officially restarted offensive operations, rapidly expanding their control over vast regions of North Kivu.

In April 2012, former National Congress for the Defence of the People (CNDP) soldiers mutinied against the DRC government and the peacekeeping contingent of the United Nations Organization Stabilization Mission in the Democratic Republic of the Congo (MONUSCO). Mutineers formed a rebel group called the March 23 Movement (M23), also known as the Congolese Revolutionary Army. It was composed of former members of the rebel CNDP, and allegedly sponsored by the governments of the neighbouring states of Rwanda and Uganda.

On 20 November 2012, M23 rebels took control of Goma, a North Kivu provincial capital with a population of one million people. By the end of November that year, the conflict had forced more than 140,000 people to flee their homes, according to the U.N. refugee agency, in addition to the refugees already forced from their homes by previous rounds of fighting in the region. After repelling an ill-organized government counterattack and making some further gains, M23 agreed to withdraw from Goma on their own and left the city in early December.

On 24 February 2013, eleven African nations signed an agreement designed to bring peace to the region. In October 2013, Congo told the UN that the M23 movement was virtually finished after being pushed back to a small area near Rwanda. On 7 November 2013, following significant defeats to a UN-backed government offensive, M23 troops crossed into Uganda and surrendered.

== Background ==
The Province of North Kivu (Nord-Kivu) in the Democratic Republic of the Congo

In March 2009, National Congress for the Defence of the People (CNDP) rebels signed a peace treaty with the government, in which it agreed to become a political party in exchange for the release of its imprisoned members.

On 4 April 2012, it was reported that Bosco Ntaganda and 300 loyal troops defected from the DRC and clashed with government forces in the Rutshuru region north of Goma. According to M23 spokesman Vianney Kazarma, the defection was due to Joseph Kabila's cheating in the Democratic Republic of the Congo general election, 2011.

== The conflict ==
=== Beginning of hostilities ===
Jason Stearns reported on 4 May 2012 that Colonel Sultani Makenga had joined the M23. Stearns commented that this "is a significant development, since Makenga was the second highest ranking CNDP officer behind Ntaganda in the Amani Leo structure as the deputy commander of South Kivu."

On 6 July 2012, M23 attacked and took the town of Bunagana less than a kilometer from the border with Uganda. Some 600 DRC troops fled across the border and took refuge in Uganda. The rebels issued a statement that they would cease their offensive if the government agreed to holding peace talks with them. The United Nations condemned rebel attacks in the region after an Indian peacekeeper was killed in the fighting.

On 8 July, the rebels captured Rutshuru, 70 kilometers north of Goma, the capital of North Kivu province. By 10 July, they were 40 kilometers from the city of Goma. Witnesses said rebels appeared to be taking towns and villages with ease, with government troops usually melting away. The towns of Rubare and Ntamugenga had also reportedly fallen to the rebels.

On 20 July, M23 and government forces exchanged heavy weapons fire around Kibumba and Rugari, forcing thousands of civilians to flee towards Goma. UN helicopter gunships were seen headed towards the front line. The security situation in eastern Congo was described as rapidly becoming worse.

=== November M23 offensive ===
Fighting broke out again in November 2012, with reports of heavy gunfire and explosions near Goma. Both sides blamed the other for the outbreak of hostilities. Government forces claimed M23 rebels suffered 110 dead, a claim the rebels denied. Government forces reportedly used tanks and helicopters in the fighting, which saw rebels advance closer to Goma nevertheless.

On 15 November, MONUSCO helicopter gunships were deployed to support government forces as they fought to hold off a rebel attack south of Kibumba, flying 17 sorties and firing more than 500 rockets and missiles. The combined army and UN assault killed approximately 64 M23 fighters. However, the rebels resumed their offensive the next day and in larger numbers; their advance put them within 18 miles of Goma. The army retreated under heavy fire to the southern outskirts of Kibumba after being forced back by the rebels, according to the provincial governor. The government army began to regroup around the nearby town of Kilimanyoka after the retreat. Later rebels claimed to have seized control of Kibumba but said they had no plans on attacking Goma. A UN spokesman told that the M23 appeared to be well equipped with night vision equipment and 120mm mortars.

On 18 November, it was reported that Congolese troops and the administration were leaving Goma in a hurry as M23 was at the gates of the city. The North Kivu governor left on a boat en route to South Kivu. The United Nations troops did not react when the rebels bypassed their camp on the road to Goma. The following day, M23 demanded that the Congolese government open peace talks, or face an escalation of fighting.

==== Taking of Goma ====
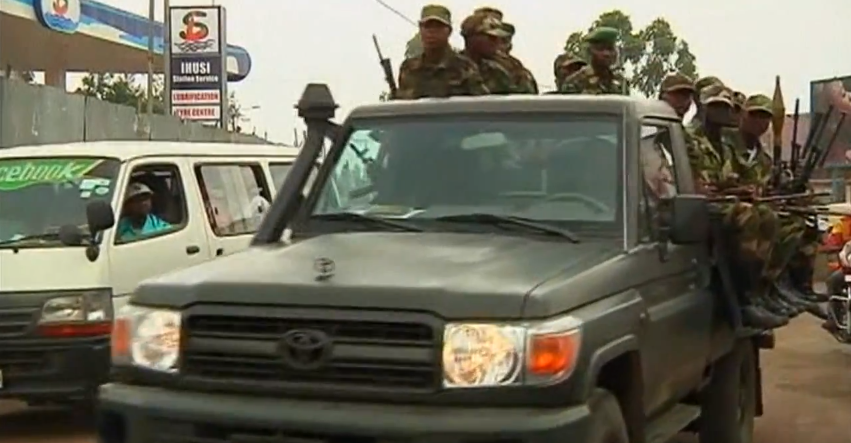
M23 rebels in Goma

M23 forces began an assault against army positions in Goma on 19 November, sending mortar shells and machine gun fire into the city which was still being defended by the government army. M23 spokesman Lt. Col. Vianney Kazarma said "Fighting is already taking place on the streets of Goma this morning." The DRC government spokesman confirmed the claim saying, "We have yet to stop this attack; they have not taken Goma yet." Congolese army units were reported to be holding defensive positions in the city centre and the airport armed with tanks and machine guns.

M23 forces entered the city proper on 20 November, advancing on foot up the main road towards the city centre. Heavy bursts of small arms fire could be heard in the city and near the airport. M23 was reported to have captured the Goma International Airport. Though other reports claimed that UN forces retained control of the airport, with Lt. Gen. Chander Prakash, commander of UN forces in the area claiming that M23 attacked the peacekeepers but were repelled.

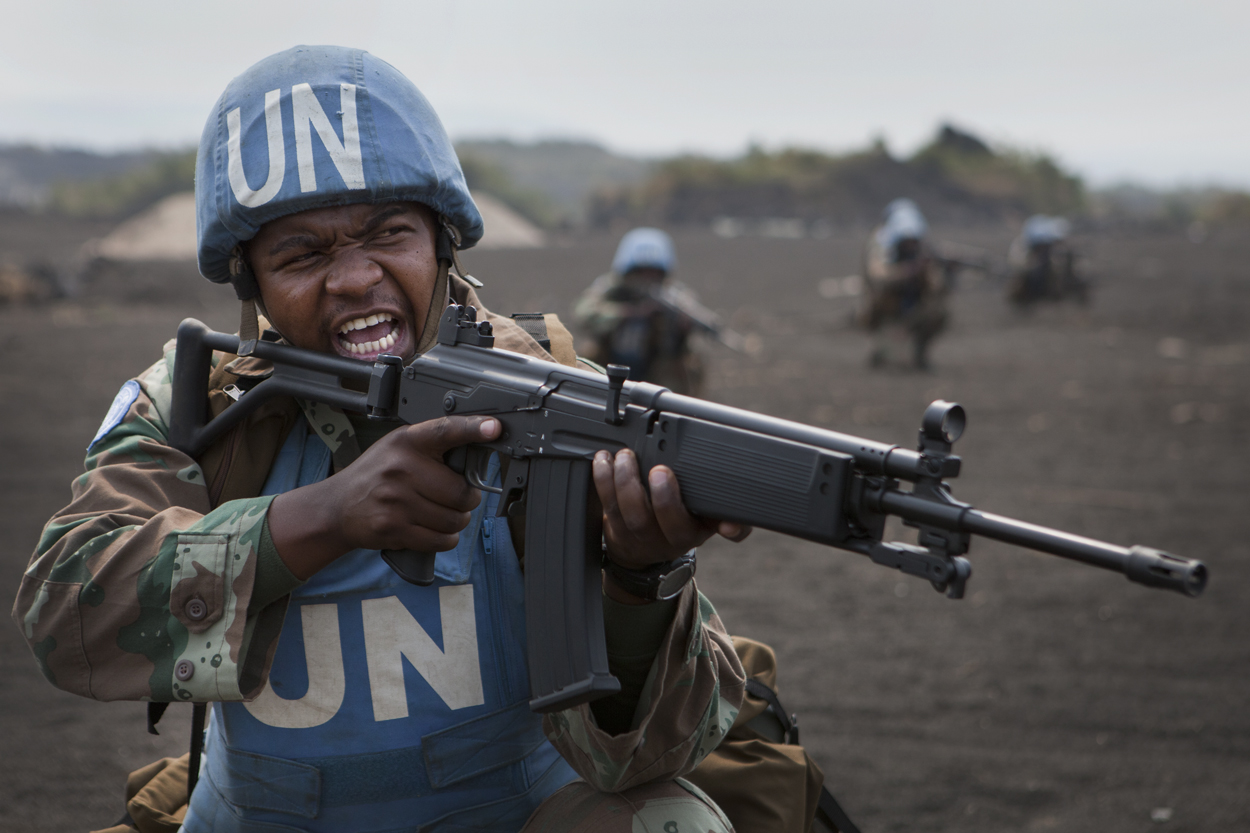
A South African peacekeeper from the MONUSCO force, pictured in 2013

M23 forces moved in two columns past Sake, eventually capturing most of Goma as well as a nearby border post with Rwanda. Some government soldiers took off their uniforms before fleeing the city.

By late morning, Congolese government troops had been forced back to the west of the city, with many abandoning their positions and withdrawing westwards from Goma entirely. Rebels marched into the centre without a shot being fired as the government army fled and UN peacekeepers stood down.

Local police surrendered their posts and weapons without resistance. M23 made a statement later on announcing: "The town of Goma fell at 11:33 local time, despite the attack helicopters, despite the heavy weapons, the FARDC [national army] has let the town fall into our hands."

Reuters reports on the scene confirmed that heavily armed M23 soldiers were present and walking through the city unchallenged, and that the UN peacekeepers present were not resisting the M23 advance through the city. Some residents came onto the streets to greet the rebel takeover. After guards of the local prison fled Goma, along with the national army, more than a thousand criminal prisoners escaped through a hole in the prison wall. The rebels ordered civil servants back to work, warning they will not tolerate corruption, and allowed the UN troops to continue to patrol the streets.

DR Congo president Joseph Kabila urged the city's people to "resist" the group's takeover. UN spokesman Eduardo del Buey said peacekeepers "cannot substitute" for the national army, adding that the 1,500 UN troops in Goma held their fire because they did not want to risk civilian lives. UN Secretary General Ban Ki-moon criticized M23 for alleged human rights violations during the takeover, including destruction of property, "intimidation of journalists", and the abduction of women and children. Noting that the First Congo War had begun with fighting in the same region, the New York Times described Goma's takeover as "raising serious questions about the stability of Congo as a whole."

==== Continued fighting ====
Almost 3,000 members of the Congolese army and police forces switched sides in Goma on 20 November and joined the rebellion as M23 continued its advance, seizing control of the town of Sake and stating that it intends to overthrow the national government. M23 forces began advancing towards the town of Bukavu, capital of South Kivu state on 21 November. They announced their next intended target after Bukavu as the city of Kisangani, the capital of Orientale Province.

Government forces, despite having withdrawn from Sake, launched a counterattack to retake the city on 22 November leading to heavy clashes with M23 forces there. The surprise counterattack was badly beaten by the rebels.

Thousands of hungry and demoralized government soldiers fled back in disarray to the town of Minova, around 50 km from Goma. They got drunk and reportedly began raping, looting and threatening civilians; the allegations were confirmed by an UN source for The Guardian, which described them as "angry and paranoid", and contrasted their appearance to the apparent discipline in the rebel ranks. The troops continued raping local civilian women and girls in a systematic way for three days, resulting in international outrage.

The "UN condemned the atrocity as "horrifying" in its scale and systematic nature." The American Bar Association's office in Goma has identified 1,014 victims, but the UN had a final list of about 126. The DRC Army prosecuted officers in 2014 in what was called the Minova Trial, the largest rape trial in DRC history. Only a few junior officers were convicted. There has been insufficient financial support for the women who were victimized, and insufficient protection for them in the years since.

=== Peace negotiations and M23 withdrawal ===
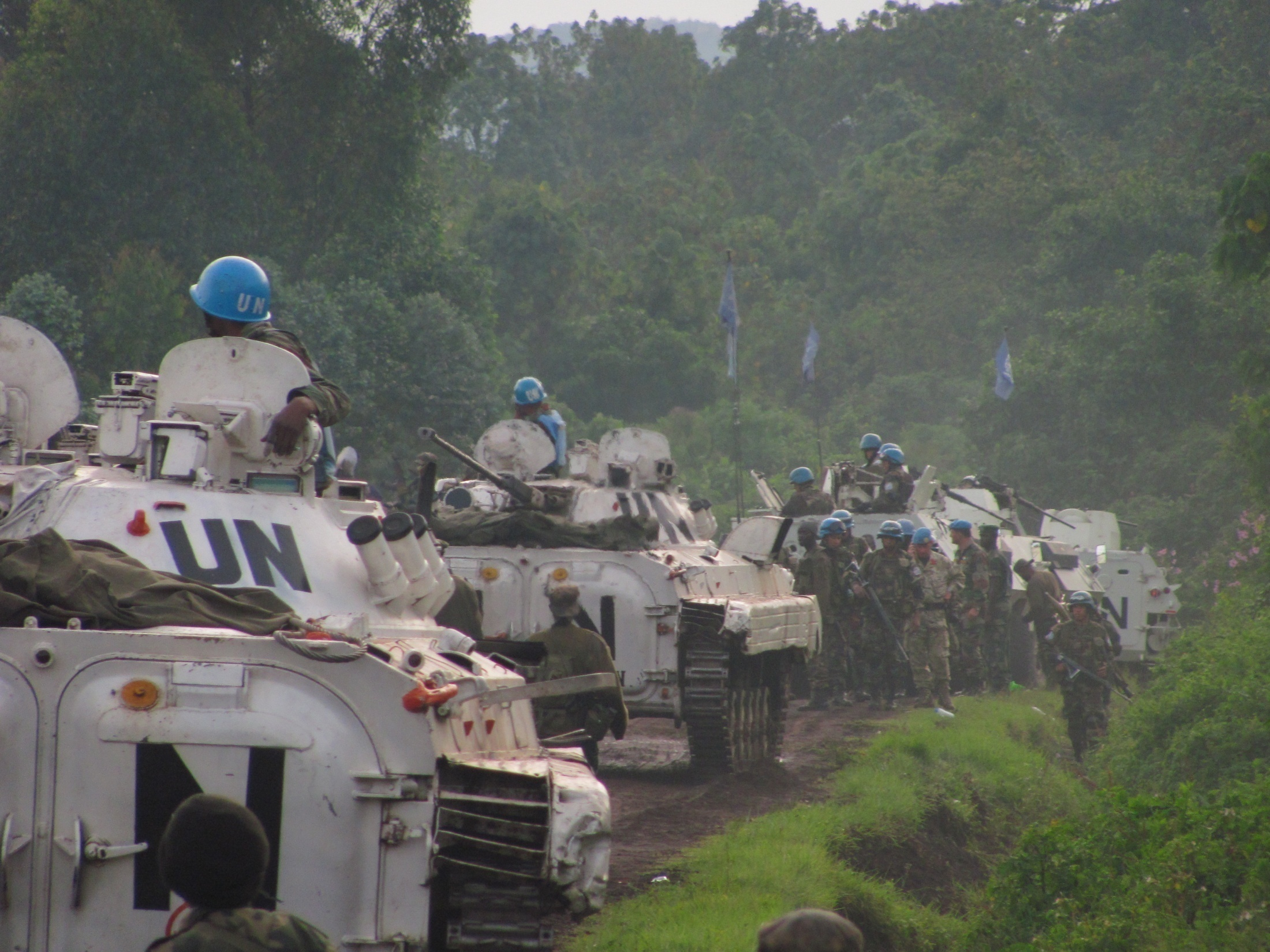
MONUSCO troops around Goma, 2012

According to the chief of Uganda People's Defence Force, M23 leader met with him and agreed to let him mediate, which resulted in M23 agreeing to withdrawing their forces from Goma and Sake in principle, although a timeframe did not appear to have been agreed upon. However, a DRC military spokesman claimed that M23 had refused to abandon Goma and said: "They have refused to leave the city of Goma. This is a declaration of war, and we intend to resume combat." Nevertheless, the next day the situation appeared to ease, with M23 agreeing to a withdrawal from captured territory, with the intention of eventually leaving Goma and returning to their original positions before they took the city.

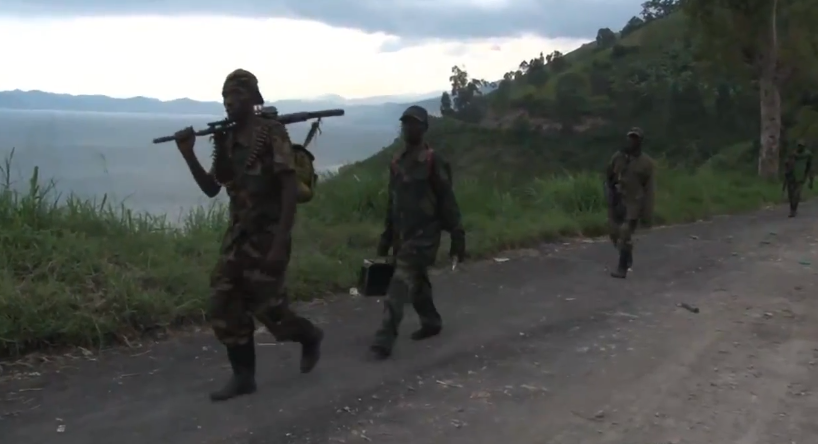
M23 rebels withdrawing from Goma, November 2012

On 1 December, M23 rebels pulled out of Goma, later under Congolese army control.

=== Peace agreement ===
On 24 February 2013, leaders of 11 African nations signed an agreement designed to bring peace to the eastern region of the Democratic Republic of Congo. Among the signers were Rwanda and Uganda, both of whom had been accused of aiding the rebellion, a charge the nations deny.

The deal, which was brokered by the United Nations, consists of two principal parts. First, it calls on the DRC to implement security reforms, work to strengthen its government, and increase cooperation with its neighbors. Second, it calls on neighboring countries to help structurally reform certain DRC organizations, but to otherwise refrain from interfering with DRC internal affairs. It also opens the possibility of a UN intervention brigade being established in the region.

Several African countries have discussed contributing troops to an intervention force, which, if formed, would supplement the 17,000 UN military personnel already working in the area. The M23 rebels were not represented in the deal's negotiations or at the signing. M23 spokesperson Bertrand Bisimwa said he had not read the agreement but hoped it would not reignite fighting.

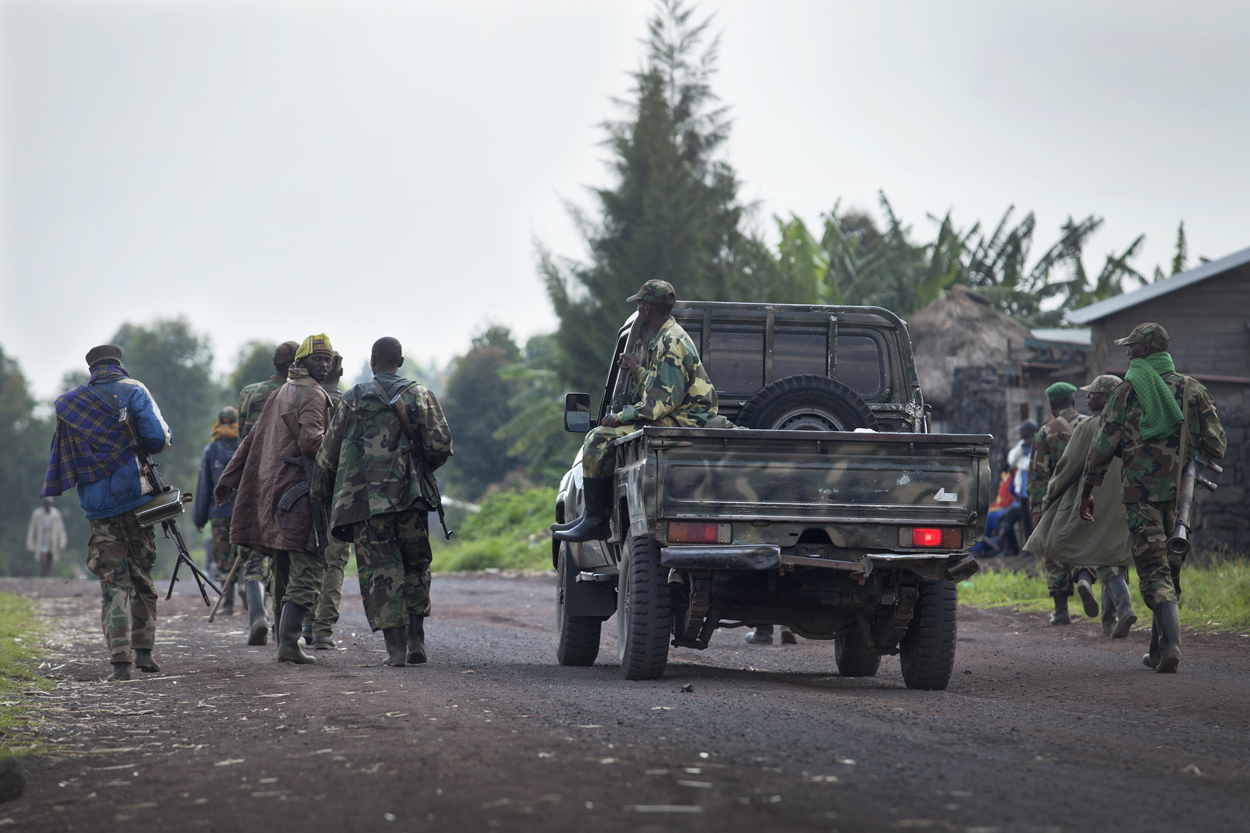
M23 rebels with a technical near Goma, March 2013

UN Secretary-General Ban Ki-moon said he hopes the accord will usher in "an era of peace and stability" for Africa's Great Lakes region, but cautioned that the agreement "only the beginning of a comprehensive approach that will require sustained engagement." He also said that a special envoy would be deployed in Congo in the near future. United States ambassador to the United Nations, Susan Rice said she welcomes the deal and called on the Congolese government to continue working towards peace.

In a statement, European Union leaders Catherine Ashton and Andris Piebalgs called the agreement and appointment of a UN envoy "important steps" in the peace process and commended the spirit of "good neighborliness" demonstrated. However, regional analyst Theodore Trefon said the agreement was not a long-term solution. "You're not going to be able to impose peace from above or the outside on people who don't want peace", he remarked. On his blog about Congo, Jason Stearns agrees writing "So are we back in a peace process? Not really. Or more precisely: We don't know yet. The agreement is more a statement of principles than a concrete action plan."

Separately, negotiations between the Congolese government and rebel leaders continued in neighboring Uganda. Ugandan Vice President Edward Ssekandi said the discussions had been productive thus far. Joseph Kabila said negotiations would continue, but added that time was running out to reach an agreement, citing the 15 March deadline for the talks.

On 18 March 2013, Bosco Ntaganda turned himself in to the U.S. embassy in Kigali, Rwanda, where he requested transfer to the International Criminal Court in The Hague. Though the reasons for his surrender are unknown it was speculated that he was either pressured to do so by Rwanda or feared infighting within the M23 movement and its military leader Sultani Makenga, which had recently forced Ntaganda's forces to flee the DRC into Rwanda. Though Rwanda was not a signatory to the Rome Statute, the media speculated it would be forced to turn him over to the ICC. The U.S. also had listed him on its War Crimes Rewards Programme. On 22 March, he was detained by the ICC. Four days later, he made his first appearance in front of the Court.

=== Internal clashes ===
On 25 February, disagreement between factions of the M23 about how to react to the peace agreement led to violence. M23's political leader, Jean-Marie Runiga Lugerero, was sacked. In a statement signed by M23's military leader, Sultani Makenga, he was accused of treason because of "financial embezzlement, divisions, ethnic hatred, deceit and political immaturity". Makenga declared himself interim leader and clashes between those loyal to Sultani Makenga and those loyal to Jean-Marie Runiga Lugerero, who is allied with Bosco Ntaganda, have killed ten men and two others were hospitalized. M23 has denied that it is hit by dissent.

=== United Nations Force Intervention Brigade ===
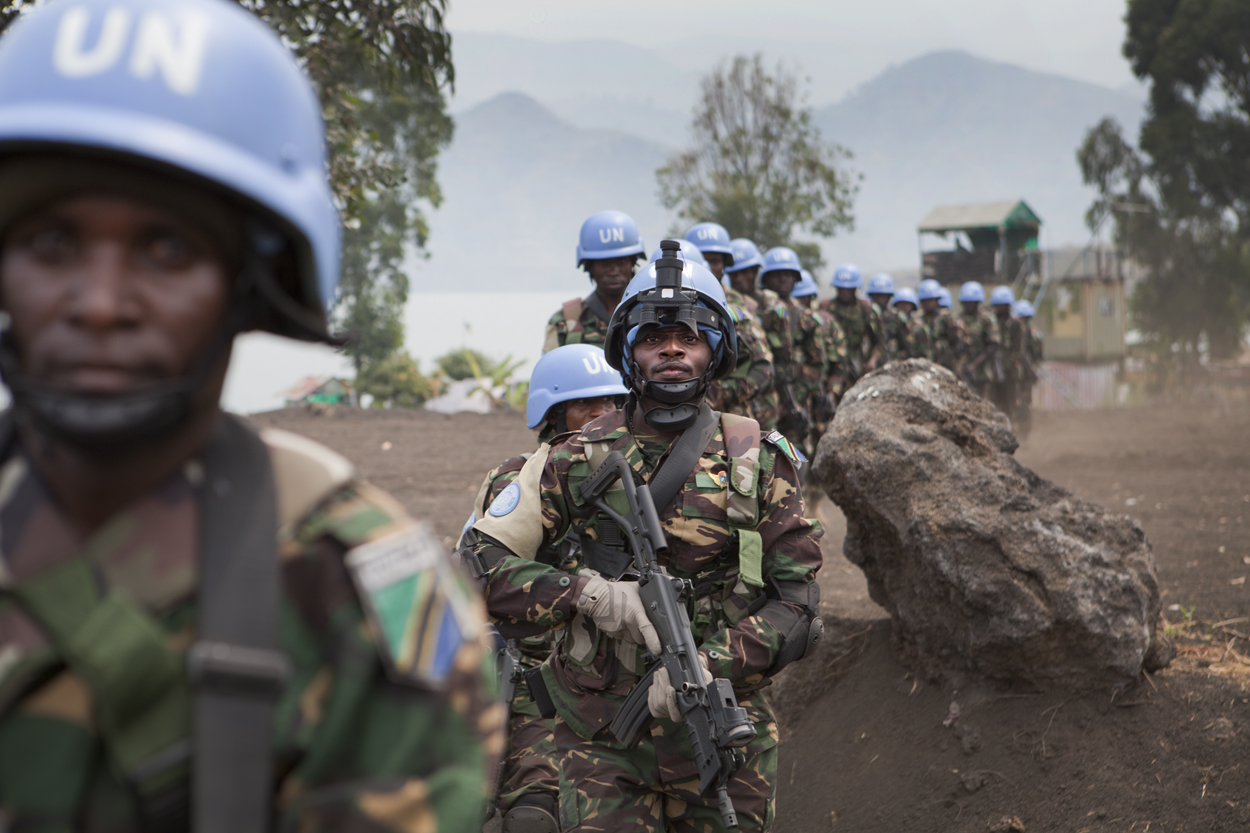
Tanzanian special forces form part of the intervention brigade

In March 2013, the United Nations Security Council authorized the deployment of an intervention brigade within MONUSCO to carry out targeted offensive operations, with or without the Congolese national army, against armed groups that threaten peace in eastern DRC. The brigade is based in North Kivu and is made up of a total of 3,069 peacekeepers. It is tasked with neutralizing armed groups, reducing the threat posed to State authority and civilian security and make space for stabilization activities.

In May 2013, fighting continued for the first time in six months as M23 attacked the government's forces north of Goma. At least 15 rebels and four government soldiers were killed in the fighting on 20 May as both sides traded artillery fire in the town of Mutaho near Goma after rebels tried to retake it from the government, which had recently seized it from them.

Clashes once again broke out in July 2013, as M23 fought back against what it said was an army assault involving aircraft and artillery. Government forces used heavy weapons against the rebels in the town of Muja, just north of Goma. A government spokesman claimed that 120 M23 members were killed, and 10 army soldiers were killed. The claim could not be independently verified. During the same fighting government's forces were accused by the UN of mistreatment of M23 detainees and desecration of corpses of M23 combatants. On 24 July 2013 the government's Mil Mi-24 gunships, piloted by Ukrainian soldiers from high altitudes, inflicted heavy civilian casualties near the village of Rumangabo.

On 30 July, the group were given a 48-hour ultimatum by the U.N. to leave the Goma area or face "use of force." Between 21 and 29 August, heavy fighting outside Goma left 57 rebels, 10–23 government soldiers, 14 civilians and one Tanzanian U.N. peacekeeper dead. 720 government soldiers and 10 U.N. peacekeepers were also wounded.

=== Congolese army offensive ===
In late October, the Congolese army captured two towns from M23 rebels: Kiwanja and Buhumba, both of which are in the Rutshuru area of North Kivu province, near the Rwandan border.

In October 2013, Congo told the UN that the movement was virtually finished after being pushed back from its key position at Mount Hehu and Rumanagabo, north of Goma, to an enclave near Rwanda. Congo also re-captured Kiwanja and Rutshuru and discovered mass graves. On 30 October, the first town seized by the rebels in 2012 was stormed by UN-backed Congolese troops as the rebels abandoned Bunagana.

Following Uganda's calls for a ceasefire on 1 November and government shelling the next day, as well as a new offensive on 3 November in the hills around the border with Uganda and Rwanda, M23 leader Bertrand Bisimwa called to "immediately end hostilities" and that "we call on the facilitator of the Kampala peace talks to immediately put in place a mechanism to monitor the ceasefire."

Despite the calls, the army accused the rebels of bombing Bunagana. Army spokesman Olivier Hamuli said: "This is not fighting, it is bombs launched by M23 targeting the population of Bunagana. They are targeting civilians." Conversely, the rebels said that they were attacked with heavy weapons. Radio Okapi reported that four civilians were killed and 10 others were wounded in Bunagana on 4 November. UN, EU and AU envoys urged both sides not to undo the progress made in peace talks and that M23 should renounce its rebellion and the army should hold off from further military action.

==== Rebel surrender ====
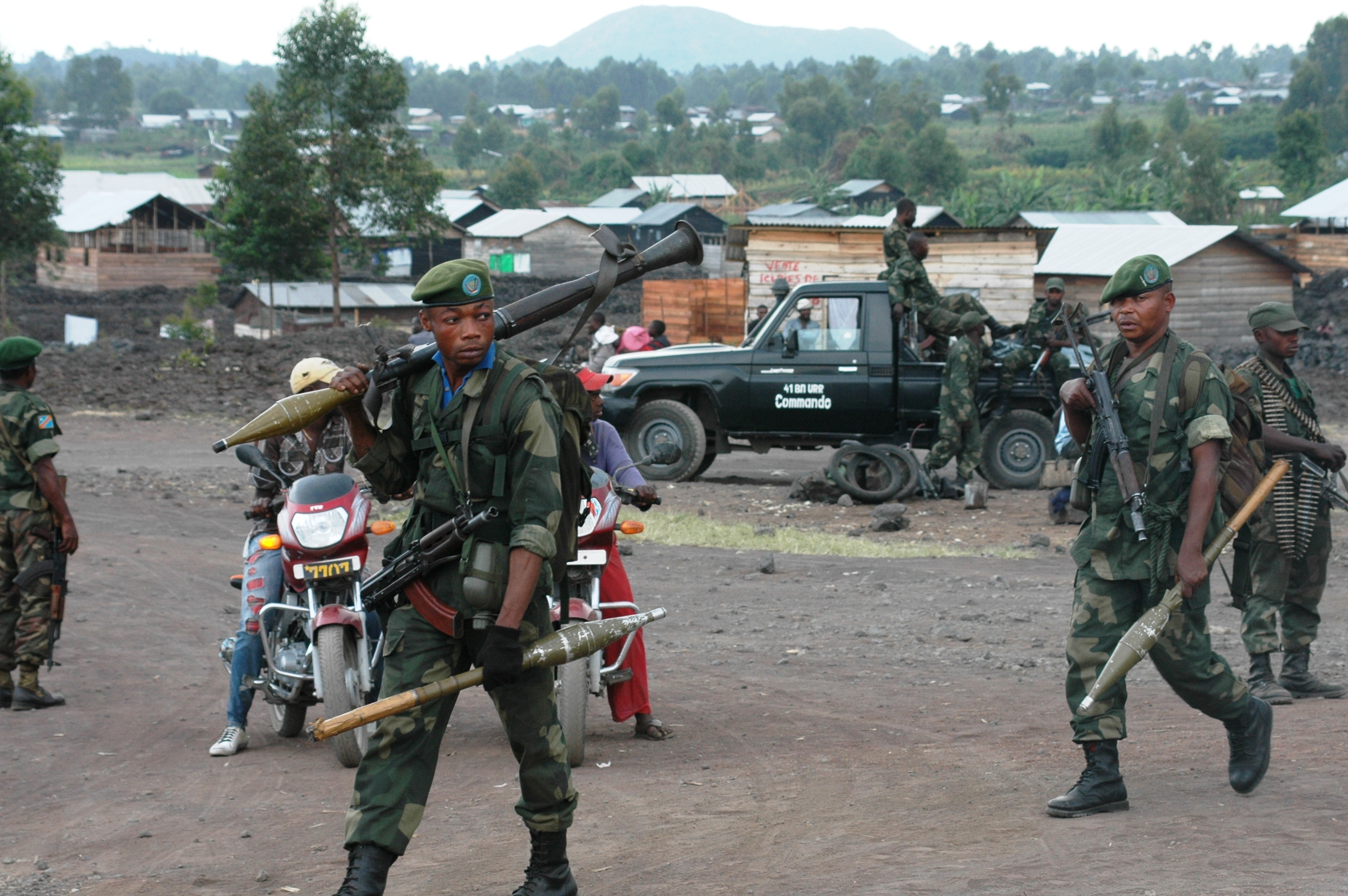
Government troops of the FARDC near Goma in May 2013

The next day, following the two-week UN-backed offensive the government claimed to have defeated the rebels, as the group said it is ending its rebellion and would disarm and demobilise its forces in order to pursue a political solution. The announcement came hours after its fighters were driven out of its last two strongholds of Tshanzu and Runyoni at about 3:00. Bisimiwa issued a statement that read: "The chief of general staff and the commanders of all major units are requested to prepare troops for disarmament, demobilisation and reintegration on terms to be agreed with the government of Congo."

Government spokesman Laurent Mende said that many rebel fighters were surrendering and that Congo was ready to pursue peace talks. The U.S. special envoy for the African Great Lakes region said from Pretoria: "In a region that has suffered so much, this is obviously a significant positive step in the right direction." On 6 November 2013, the 23 March rebels fled the country. The next day, the rebels surrendered at Mgahinga Gorilla National Park in Uganda as about 1,500 fighters, believed to be most of the force were held after surrendering in Kisoro by the borders, this included Sultani Makenga. M23's surrender has sparked many questions of legal accountability for military leaders, such as Makenga, but also for lower level combatants and other parties to the conflict.

=== Agreement ===
At a meeting in Entebbe, Uganda, the Congolese government delegation left the talks after a failure to agree to a wording of a document intended to officially end the insurgency. Government spokesman Lambert Mende said: "Uganda seems now to be acting as part of the conflict. It has interests in M23." At the same time, no dates for talks to resume were set.

Ugandan President Yoweri Museveni was also accused of subverting the East African Community by marginalising the leaders of Burundi and Tanzania by not inviting them for the talks. Freedom and Unity Front leader General David Sejusa said: "He started that rebellion. He gave them arms, he gave them financial support, he gave them equipment, and he gave them uniforms. So, it's not like I'm talking out of the blue. But, then, the chameleon he is, he turns around and then he postures as if he's the one who wants to bring peace."

On 12 December 2013, Kenyan President Uhuru Kenyatta's spokesman, Manoah Esipisu, said that an agreement had been signed in Nairobi between the government of the Democratic Republic of Congo and the M23 movement.

Despite the agreement, there were difficulties in pacifying the region. Over the 14–15 December weekend, at least 21 people were discovered to have been hacked to death in the area, although the perpetrators were not known. There were also concerns about DDR for M23 officers and soldiers who were in Uganda and Rwanda and fears of renewed instability. Furthermore, on 2 January, Colonel Mamadou Ndala, who helped lead the counter-operations, was killed in North Kivu province by the Allied Democratic Forces-NALU (ADF-NALU).

== Allegations of Rwandan involvement ==
A UN report stated that the rebels were getting support from Rwanda. According to the DR Congo government, 25 Rwandan members of M23 have surrendered as part of a total of over 370 M23 soldiers that have allegedly surrendered by 25 June. On 19 November, Rwanda claimed that the DRC government forces fired tank and mortar shells across the border into its territory. The DRC government confirmed the incident, but claimed that Rwanda shelled its own territory to justify a wider-scale intervention in the DRC.

The U.S. government announced on 21 July that it would cut military aid to Rwanda. U.S. Ambassador-at-Large for War Crimes Issues Stephen Rapp stated that Rwandan authorities could be charged for "aiding and abetting" war crimes: "There is a line that one can cross under international law where you can be held responsible for aiding a group in a way that makes possible their commission of atrocities." The United States cited Rwandan support for the M23 militia, while they employed child soldiers.

Rwanda denied that it was backing the rebels, calling the accusation an attempt to make the nation a "scapegoat" for DRC's problems. The SANDF said it was unable to confirm that Rwanda has supported M23.

On 30 November 2012, the United Kingdom's international development secretary Justine Greening declared that the UK government decided to withhold a multimillion-dollar aid payment to Rwanda over allegations that it is backing M23 rebels. Rwandan Foreign Minister Louise Mushikiwabo replied that the measure "is based on allegations of faulty reports which we have said for the last six months are wrong."

== See also ==
- Laurent Nkunda
