= Yusuf Mboneza =

Congolese military officer

- Born: Yusufu Eric Mboneza; Masisi Territory
- Died: June 2022 (disputed); Near Runyoni, Democratic Republic of the Congo
- Military career
- Allegiance: Rally for Congolese Democracy (before 2003); National Congress for the Defence of the People (?–2009); DR Congo (2009–2012); March 23 Movement (from 2012)
- Branch: Armed Forces of the Democratic Republic of the Congo (2009–2012)
- Rank: Brigadier general (alleged)
- Units: 4th Battalion (CNDP); 212th Brigade (FARDC); 808th Regiment (FARDC)
- Conflicts: Second Congo War; Kivu conflict: M23 rebellion (2012–2013); M23 offensive (2022)

Yusufu Eric Mboneza, more commonly called Yusuf Mboneza, (Note: He is often just called "Colonel Mboneza" and sometimes also "Eric Mboneza" or "Joseph Mboneza") (reportedly died June 2022) is or was a Congolese military officer and rebel. During his career he served in the Rally for Congolese Democracy, the National Congress for the Defence of the People, the Armed Forces of the Democratic Republic of the Congo, and finally the March 23 Movement.

== Biography ==
=== Early life ===
Yusufu Eric Mboneza was born in the Masisi Territory. He belonged to the Gogwe clan (Bagogwe), a sub-group of the Tutsi people. Throughout his life, he fought for several rebel groups. He had one relative, Emmanuel Nsengiyumva, who also became a militant.

In the Second Congo War, Mboneza served in the Rally for Congolese Democracy (RCD). In course of the Kivu conflict, he eventually joined the National Congress for the Defence of the People (CNDP), becoming a major and commander of the CNDP's 4th Battalion. On 9 March 2007, rebels who probably belonged to Mboneza's unit murdered Richard Bemeriki, priest of the Jomba parish church in Rutshuru Territory. When the CNDP fractured in 2009, Mboneza sided with CNDP leader Laurent Nkunda alongside several other officers including Sultani Makenga.

The CNDP eventually agreed to a peace deal and integrated its forces into the Armed Forces of the Democratic Republic of the Congo (FARDC). Mboneza was appointed lieutenant colonel and commander of the FARDC's 212th Brigade, based at Walikale. However, he retained considerable autonomy, and factually ruled the Mubi-Ndjingala axis to profit from local mining operations. Under his command, the 212th Brigade imposed illegal taxes on civilians working at the Bisie mine, making tens of thousands of dollars per month. In July 2010 insurgents belonging to Mai-Mai Sheka and FDLR raided Kilambo. Mboneza refused to engage the enemy, and retreated with his loyal troops, leaving Colonel Chuma Balumisa's soldiers to face the rebels alone. Later, the FARDC ordered the 212th Brigade's redeployment to the Kibua-Mpofi axis. However, Mboneza refused to follow this order as well, arguing that this would mean insufficient profits for his forces. In response, he was arrested on 12 August 2010. Mboneza was charged with insubordination, refusing to obey an order, and for his previous inaction during the Kilambo attack. However, 50 FARDC (ex-CNDP) troops subsequently surrounded the military prosecutor's office in Goma where Mboneza was held, forcing the lieutenant colonel's release. After this incident, the FARDC decided to punish Mboneza with a disciplinary sanction of 14-day-suspension and his transfer to South Kivu.

He was later promoted to colonel and moved to head the FARDC's 808th Regiment in Beni, North Kivu.

=== Career in M23 ===
Ex-CNDP troops in the FARDC, dissatisfied with the conditions of their service, organized the March 23 Movement (M23) in 2012. Mboneza quickly defected to the new rebel group, leaving his post at Beni alongside his followers to join forces with the Mai-Mai of Kakule la Fontaine at Kasuo. The M23 forces subsequently launched a large rebellion, capturing much of North Kivu. Mboneza rose to head of military operations in M23. In August 2013, the United States and France submitted a request to the United Nations, stating that Mboneza should be sanctioned for human rights violations. Human Rights Watch accused him of having ordered the unlawful execution of a 24-year-old man for alleged thievery. At the time of M23's ultimate defeat and surrender to the FARDC and UN peacekeepers in November 2013, he was considered one of the group's main commanders alongside Sultani Makenga and others. M23 was largely dismantled, and its troops moved into refugee camps in Uganda.

In December 2016, civilian protests erupted in several cities across the DR Congo against President Joseph Kabila. The Congolese government responded by hiring ex-M23 troops to help to suppress the protests. Mboneza was involved in these efforts, cooperating with "a high-ranking Congolese army official" to enlist former rebels for pro-government operations.

In 2017, Mboneza was part of Sultani Makenga's faction which broke off from the rest of M23, leaving Uganda to resume the insurgency in the eastern DR Congo. He subsequently assumed responsibility for leading the ground operations of this remnant group, serving directly under Makenga. In March 2022, Makenga's group launched a larger offensive, eventually supported by other M23 factions, and retook some territory in North Kivu. According to the newspaper Eco News, Mboneza was killed during this campaign, when a M23 force was defeated by the FARDC at the Runyoni frontline in June 2022. Sultani Makenga was also allegedly wounded in the same clash. In January 2023, the news site Umuseke claimed that Mboneza was still alive and had been promoted to brigadier general in M23.
