= National Congress for the Defence of the People =

Congolese rebel group

National Congress for the Defence of the People Congrès national pour la défense du peuple (in French)
- Leader: Laurent Nkunda
- Dates active: July 26, 2006 – March 23, 2009
- Active regions: Democratic Republic of the Congo, primarily North Kivu
- Ideology: Pro-Tutsi interests Pro-Rwanda

The National Congress for the Defence of the People (French: Congrès national pour la défense du peuple, CNDP) was a Congolese Rwandan-backed paramilitary rebel group active in the eastern Democratic Republic of the Congo during the Kivu conflict. Established on 26 July 2006 by Laurent Nkunda in North Kivu Province, the CNDP emerged as the immediate successor to the Congolese Rally for Democracy–Goma (RCD-Goma), another Rwandan-sponsored rebel faction. With strong military and financial ties to Rwanda, the CNDP positioned itself as a defender of the Tutsi population and claimed to be combating the Democratic Forces for the Liberation of Rwanda (FDLR), a pretext it used to challenge President Joseph Kabila's government while engaging in the illicit extraction and commercialization of natural resources.

In 2002, Nkunda served as RCD-Goma's brigade commander in Kisangani. By early 2003, he inaugurated the political movement Synergie pour la paix et la concorde. The RCD-Goma remained active until a 2003 peace deal in South Africa led to a transitional government and the goal of unifying the country by integrating all major armed groups into a national army. However, fearing marginalization under Kabila's administration, the RCD-Goma sought to preserve its influence. Nkunda was appointed as the group's commander in North Kivu but declined to attend his swearing-in in Kinshasa, citing security concerns. Analysts suggested Rwanda positioned Nkunda as a proxy to retain its control over the eastern DRC. In December 2003, Synergie pour la paix et la concorde was formalized in Bukavu and established its operational base in Goma. Tensions escalated after the February 2004 arrest of Officer Joseph Kasongo in South Kivu for his alleged involvement in the assassination of President Laurent-Désiré Kabila. Clashes between the army and the RCD-Goma erupted, culminating in a ten-day siege of Bukavu, after which Nkunda's forces retreated. By December 2004, internal schisms within the RCD-Goma deteriorated when local Hutu leaders issued letters condemning the manipulation of Banyarwanda identity and pledging loyalty to the central government. This division prompted North Kivu's Governor Eugène Serufuli to shift allegiance to Kinshasa, signaling the decline of the RCD-Goma's influence. By mid-2005, Nkunda's network had grown as former RCD-Goma commanders defected to his cause. On 8 September 2005, he accused the government of ethnic cleansing in North Kivu and called for its removal by force. The same year, many ex-RCD-Goma soldiers defected to Nkunda's ranks amid the ongoing military integration process known as brassage. The government issued an arrest warrant for Nkunda, and in late 2005, the first major confrontation between defectors and national forces took place in Rutshuru Territory.

In early 2006, Nkunda reinforced his ranks by recruiting General Bosco Ntaganda, who would later be appointed chief of staff of the newly constituted CNDP. The group was officially established on 26 July 2006, with Nkunda as both chairman and supreme commander. Despite the outcome of the 2006 elections, which saw Kabila's coalition secure significant victories in the Kivus, Nkunda's ambitions remained unmet. The CNDP launched a major offensive on Sake in November 2006, but the Congolese army's disarray allowed them to inch closer to Goma, forcing MONUC peacekeepers to intervene. The ensuing peace talks, mediated by Rwanda, resulted in a peace agreement that integrated CNDP fighters into the national army. However, the integration process, known as mixage, failed by August 2007, as it led to severe human rights violations, particularly against the Hutu population. By December 2007, the government launched an unsuccessful military operation against the CNDP that culminated in a decisive CNDP victory at Mushaki. Despite efforts to broker peace through the Goma Conference on 23 January 2008, CNDP abandoned the process. By mid-2008, the Congolese army suffered heavy defeats, and CNDP captured Masisi and Rutshuru territories. International pressure led to the Ihusi Agreement in January 2009, after which Ntaganda removed Nkunda as the CNDP's leader following his arrest in Rwanda. The CNDP was officially integrated into the Congolese military in March 2009, which then marked the group's dissolution.

== History ==
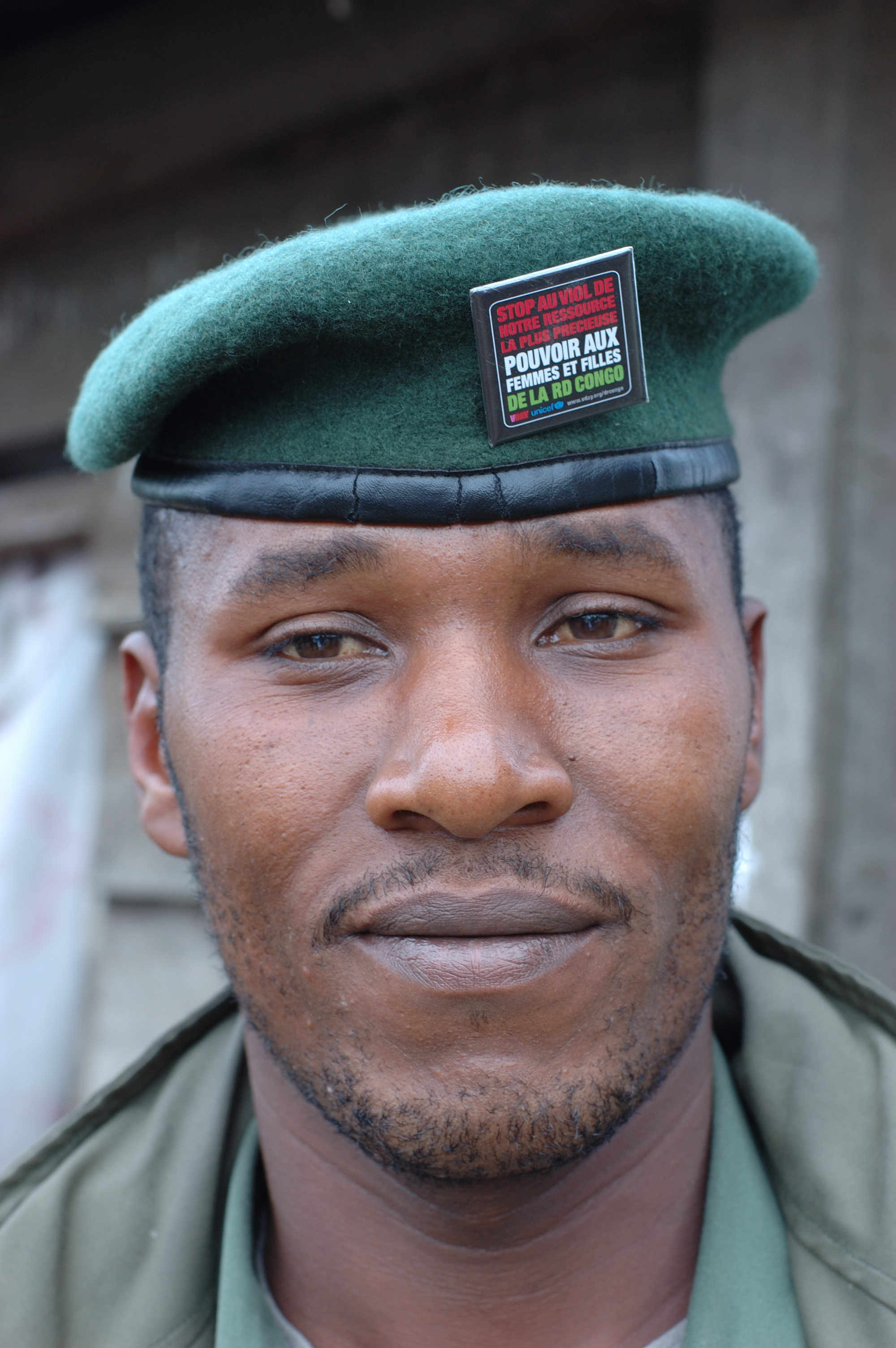
A soldier of the CNDP in 2008 (with an anti-rape badge on his beret).

=== Origins and background ===
The CNDP's origins can be traced to the complex political and military dynamics that happened in the DRC after the Rwandan government's fallout with Laurent-Désiré Kabila in 1998. The deterioration of relations stemmed from ethnic tensions and suspicions that Congolese Tutsis were aligned with Rwanda's interests rather than those of the DRC. In response, Rwanda sought to establish a new rebellion and employed a distinct strategy in North Kivu, which involved courting influential Congolese Hutu leaders to distance them from exiled Rwandan Hutus, particularly génocidaires and soldiers loyal to the former Rwandan regime, who aimed to reclaim power. This rebellion materialized as the Rassemblement Congolais pour la Démocratie-Goma (RCD-Goma, Rally for Congolese Democracy–Goma). The RCD-Goma, alongside Rwandan troops, engaged in counterinsurgency operations against the Democratic Forces for the Liberation of Rwanda (FDLR) and Mai-Mai militias aligned with Congolese government. Reports suggested that the United States provided military support to Rwanda in the lead-up to the Second Congo War, potentially motivated by strategic interests in the DRC's vast natural resources. A U.S. Army Rwanda Interagency Assessment Team (RIAT) was deployed to Rwanda in July 1998 to train Rwandan units, a move that coincided with the outbreak of hostilities in the DRC. American photojournalist and war correspondent Keith Harmon Snow alleged that Roger Winter, a key figure in the U.S. Committee for Refugees and Immigrants, orchestrated U.S.-endorsed insurgencies in Congo and neighboring states, including Rwanda, Sudan, and Uganda. During this period, tensions also emerged between Rwandan Defence Force (RDF) and Congolese Tutsi officers. While the Rwandan government regarded these officers as part of its military due to prior training and collaboration, many Congolese Tutsi officers insisted they had only fought in the Rwandan army to "liberate" the DRC. A notable example of this friction was the Murekezi mutiny in May 1997, following the First Congo War. After the overthrow of President Mobutu Sese Seko, Rwanda withdrew its troops from the DRC and encouraged Congolese Tutsis from North and South Kivu to follow. This directive aroused suspicion within the Congolese Tutsi community, which, despite its reliance on Rwandan protection, maintained a strong sense of independence. Lieutenant Murekezi, a Tutsi from Masisi, led a mutiny against the withdrawal, arguing that Congolese Tutsis should not be compelled to relocate to Rwanda. His rebellion was met with a severe response, culminating in his execution by a Rwandan commander in Goma in November 1997. Many of his followers were either killed, imprisoned, or later redeployed to the DRC under demoted and demoralized conditions. Several future CNDP and M23 officers, including Christian Pay-Pay, Faustin Muhindo, Baudouin Ngaruye, Claude Micho, and Wilson Nsengiyumva, were associated with this mutiny.

In early 2003, General Laurent Nkunda, a Congolese Tutsi who had served as the RCD's brigade commander in Kisangani, where the group was implicated in the May 2002 massacre of over 160 civilians, launched a political movement called Synergy for Peace and Harmony (Synergie pour la paix et la concorde). The RCD-Goma rebellion persisted until 2003 when a peace deal signed in South Africa established a transitional government designed to unify the country by merging all major armed groups into a single national army. However, the CNDP emerged as a direct consequence of flaws in the transition process. The RCD-Goma feared marginalization under President Joseph Kabila's administration and sought to consolidate its influence. During this period, Nkunda was nominated as the RCD's commander in North Kivu but refused to travel to Kinshasa for his swearing-in, citing security concerns. Analysts speculated that Rwanda was positioning Nkunda as a proxy to maintain influence in eastern DRC. As part of the military integration process, the RCD-Goma recalled many of its Banyarwanda commanders to North Kivu to consolidate control. These commanders formed the 81st, 82nd, and 83rd Brigades, which dominated Masisi and Walikale and later became the core of Nkunda's forces. In December 2003, Synergie pour la paix et la concorde was formalized in Bukavu before establishing an operational base in Goma.

=== Early clashes ===
Tensions escalated in February 2004 when the RCD-Goma's Major Joseph Kasongo, who had been sentenced to death in absentia for his alleged role in the assassination of President Laurent-Désiré Kabila in 2001, was arrested by General Prosper Nabyolwa, a Kabila loyalist. In response, the RCD-Goma's senior commander in Bukavu, Colonel Jules Mutebutsi, launched an attack against Nabyolwa, leading to his replacement by General Mbuza Mabe. In May 2004, open conflict erupted when government forces targeted Tutsi officers, culminating in the execution of approximately 15 Tutsi civilians, including minors. This development led to accusations of genocide by the Rwandan government and Nkunda, who mobilized his network of RCD-Goma loyalists in North Kivu. With logistical support from Rwanda, including arms shipments across Lake Kivu, Nkunda and his forces advanced on Bukavu. The battle for the city lasted ten days but severely destabilized the transition process. Although international pressure forced Nkunda to retreat, political and military hostilities intensified. RCD-Goma leader Azarias Ruberwa subsequently suspended the group's participation in the transitional government, prompting Kinshasa to deploy thousands of reinforcements to eastern DRC to enforce military integration.

In December 2004, a group of Hutu military officers and local leaders issued letters condemning the manipulation of Banyarwanda identity and expressing allegiance to the central government. This exposed a historical rift between different factions within the RCD-Goma. Many of the signatories, including Goma Mayor Xavier Nzabara and Colonel Janvier Mayanga, had previously fought against Rwandan troops between 1996 and 1998. In response to these divisions, Eugène Serufuli Ngayabaseka, the North Kivu's Governor, shifted his allegiance to Kinshasa, stating that the RCD-Goma no longer had a future. His defection concerned both Nkunda and his Rwandan backers. In mid-2005, General James Kabarebe, Rwanda's Chief of Defence Staff, instructed high-ranking ex-RCD-Goma officers to ensure Nkunda's protection as he prepared to return to the DRC. Operating from Kitchanga, the headquarters of the 83rd Brigade, Nkunda began rallying former RCD-Goma commanders to defect from the national army. On 8 September 2005, Nkunda issued a statement accusing the government of orchestrating ethnic cleansing in North Kivu and calling for its removal by force. His announcement effectively signaled the beginning of a new rebellion. At the time, the Congolese military was undergoing brassage, an integration program that required soldiers to complete a 45-day training before being deployed to a region different from where they had previously fought. As part of the process, soldiers also had the option to demobilize and return to civilian life. Fearing deployment outside the Kivus, many ex-RCD-Goma troops defected to Nkunda's ranks. By the end of 2005, a significant portion of the 82nd Brigade had joined him, while elements of the 81st and 83rd Brigades refused integration and coalesced under his leadership. Bwiza camp became the site where senior officers received training in military strategy and ideology. Among them were all the battalion commanders who had previously defected from the brassage process. The first training program, known as the Senior Officer Leadership Course (SOLEC), was followed by the Officer Management Course, for which the Rwandan government provided a management book. From the initial group of graduates at Bwiza, Nkunda formed a new high command capable of making key military decisions. To manage daily operations, he established an état major (general staff office) and began reorganizing his forces into a structured brigade and battalion system.

Frightened by Nkunda's growing influence, the government issued an arrest warrant against him on 7 September 2005. The first major confrontation between defectors and national forces occurred in late 2005 in Rutshuru Territory, a former RCD-Goma stronghold. Lieutenant Colonel Shé Kasikila, commander of the newly integrated brigade, initiated security operations to recover weapons distributed to civilians by ex-RCD-Goma officials. He immediately began cordon-and-search missions to retrieve the weapons. Kasikila was vocal in condemning Tutsi and Rwandan involvement in the DRC and played a key role in uncovering mass graves containing the victims of massacres carried out by the Rwandan army and its Congolese allies during the First Congo War. Some defectors who later joined the CNDP accused Kasikila of systematically abusing Banyarwanda, though the extent of these abuses was likely exaggerated and may have been used as a pretext to provoke unrest. Nkunda's forces responded with violent reprisals, attempting to assassinate Kasikila and launching an offensive that drove government forces out of Rutshuru. Serufuli condemned Nkunda's actions in a public communiqué. Soon after, Colonel David Rugayi, a Hutu officer leading the 83rd Brigade, defected with over 1,400 soldiers, joining the national army. A few months later, Colonel Smith Gihanga, the commander of the 81st Brigade, followed suit. This resulted in Nkunda losing his two most critical Hutu officers, effectively dismantling the Hutu-Tutsi alliance that had been central to RCD-Goma's success in North Kivu.

=== Formation ===
National elections, scheduled for July 2006, faced increasing security challenges, exacerbated by Nkunda's rejection of the military integration process and growing divisions between the Hutu and Tutsi populations, as well as the proliferation of armed groups. Nkunda, now commanding several thousand fighters, controlled much of the Masisi highlands. Although Kinshasa sought to appease the rebels, including persuading over 1,400 of Nkunda's Hutu troops to defect, Nkunda showed no interest in striking a deal. He focused on strengthening his position by establishing a sophisticated movement, including a public relations apparatus for his political wing and training camps for his troops, which he called the Conseil militaire pour la défense du peuple (CMDP), or the Military Council for the Defense of the People, also known as the Anti-Genocide Brigade.

In early 2006, Nkunda expanded his network by incorporating General Bosco Ntaganda, a former chief of staff of the Union des Patriotes Congolais (UPC), into his ranks. Within months, Ntaganda was appointed as the CNDP's Chief of Staff. As part of his strategic expansion, Nkunda merged his political platform, Synergie, with his military wing, the CMDP. On 26 July 2006, the CNDP was formally established, with Nkunda as both Chairman and Supreme Commander. The CNDP's platform focused on addressing the concerns and insecurities of the Tutsi community, particularly the eradication of the FDLR rebels and the return of the 55,000 Congolese Tutsi refugees still living in Rwanda. The CNDP distinguished itself from other armed groups in the DRC by its advanced organizational structure, including a radio station, a communications team, and a network of websites (now defunct). The CNDP also created a system of syndicats—grassroots structures aimed at mobilizing funds, recruits, and spreading CNDP ideology. These syndicats extended beyond rural Masisi, with chapters in countries such as Canada, South Africa, and Belgium. The CNDP drew significant inspiration from the Rwandan Patriotic Front (RPF), including its expansive network and focus on ideological conditioning. In line with RPF practices, Nkunda organized rallies for local populations, which included speeches, dancing, and singing to promote unity and loyalty to the movement. CNDP ideology was also propagated in schools, where children learned songs praising CNDP commanders. In addition to its military and ideological efforts, the CNDP exercised control over the population, setting up a police force, imposing taxes, and organizing communal labor. In return, the group provided security, paid some school fees and medical expenses for impoverished families, and managed local infrastructure. However, the CNDP was also known for its brutal methods of discipline, punishing those who resisted its regulations or were suspected of collaborating with its enemies.

=== Resumption of fighting ===
Despite the outcome of the 2006 elections, which saw Kabila's coalition, Alliance of the Presidential Majority (AMP; Alliance pour la majorité présidentielle) secure significant victories in the Kivus, Nkunda's ambitions remained unfulfilled. No Tutsis were elected to the North Kivu provincial assembly, and only one Tutsi, Dunia Bakarani, a non-RCD-Goma candidate from Masisi, made it to the National Assembly. Tensions escalated following the controversial killing of a Tutsi businessman, Musafiri Mayogi, by Congolese police on 24 November 2006 in Sake. The police claimed they acted in self-defense after he drew a pistol and fired at an officer, while CNDP argued that the police had deliberately killed him. This incident sparked a full-scale CNDP offensive on Sake from 25 to 26 November, resulting in at least 25 civilian deaths from shelling and crossfire. Additional casualties occurred in Kitchanga and Tongo groupement, where mass graves were later discovered near Tingi, outside Sake. The Congolese army, in disarray, was unable to halt their advance, and the United Nations Mission in the Democratic Republic of Congo (MONUC) peacekeepers were forced to intervene.

After a bloody clash, which saw over 150 CNDP soldiers killed, peace negotiations were initiated. Rwanda played a significant role in mediating these talks, resulting in a peace agreement that mandated the integration of CNDP fighters into the Congolese army, though without being redeployed outside the Kivus. Nkunda, accompanied by Kinshasa's chief negotiator, General John Numbi, was flown to Kigali.

=== The mixage process, human rights abuses and military expansion ===
In December 2006, a new military integration strategy known as "mixage" was introduced, creating six "mixed" brigades to combat the FDLR. Human Rights Watch noted that, at the time, the FDLR was attacking Congolese civilians more often than engaging Rwandan forces. The mixage agreement was implemented in January and February 2007, but within months, the arrangement fell apart. Even before its failure, conflicting accounts emerged regarding the actual terms agreed upon by the parties. Nkunda maintained control over his troops, keeping his forces intact and benefiting from financial support and military supplies. The military campaign against the FDLR fueled tensions and directly contributed to the outbreak of the second CNDP war, as counterinsurgency efforts led to severe human rights violations, particularly against the Hutu population, who had been living alongside the FDLR in certain areas for years.

Even after the initiation of mixage, many of Nkunda's troops continued to operate in the same areas where they had previously been identified as renegade forces. In some cases, individuals who had committed human rights abuses were later integrated into the national army. In December 2006, a woman in Jomba groupement, Rutshuru Territory, who had escaped an attempted rape by Nkunda's soldiers, returned to find the same perpetrators now officially deployed as security personnel. Similarly, residents of Rutshuru town, who had suffered violence at the hands of Nkunda's troops in January 2007, were alarmed when these forces were stationed there under the national army's banner. During early January 2007, Médecins Sans Frontières (MSF) documented 181 cases of rape in Mutanda, Rutshuru. Over 50 villages were looted, and more than 60 vehicles were ambushed, with many of these attacks occurring at night, complicating efforts to identify the perpetrators. Soldiers of the Bravo Brigade's 2nd Battalion, loyal to Nkunda and commanded by Lieutenant Colonel Innocent Zimulinda, were reported to have abducted residents, who were never seen again and are presumed dead. On 9 March 2007, the Bravo Brigade's 2nd Battalion soldiers forced the residents of Buramba to attend a meeting where they threatened to execute anyone suspected of collaborating with the FDLR. Later that day, as Bravo Brigade officers and troops were traveling from Nyamilima to Rutshuru town, they were ambushed near Buramba, reportedly by FDLR combatants. Although no fatalities were reported, the following day, the 2nd Battalion, stationed in Nyamilima under the command of Lieutenant Colonel Innocent Nzamulinda, launched a reprisal attack on Buramba, resulting in the deaths of at least 15 civilians, including women and children. Investigations indicated that the attack was ordered by Colonel Sultani Makenga, who was present in Nyamilima on 9 March and whose convoy had been targeted.

On 9 March, Bravo Brigade soldiers were responsible for the killing of Abbé Richard Bemeriki, the priest of Jomba parish church in Rutshuru. While the exact battalion involved was not identified, the 4th Battalion, commanded by Major Yusuf Mboneza, was stationed in the area at the time. In the first four months of its deployment, the 2nd Battalion of Bravo Brigade was responsible for several violent incidents, including the Buramba massacre, which resulted in the deaths of 10 civilians. In Kiseguru and Katwiguru villages near Buramba, civilians accused of collaborating with the FDLR were executed by Bravo Brigade soldiers, using firearms or blunt force weapons such as hammers. Other mixed brigades were also implicated in violent acts. In the village of Rubaya, located in Masisi Territory, four civilians were killed on 29 April 2007 when soldiers of the Charlie Brigade opened fire on two motorbike taxis, killing the drivers and passengers instantly. The perpetrators were identified as members of the personal guard of Colonel Wilson Nsengiyumva, the deputy commander of the brigade and a former officer in Nkunda's forces. As the mixage process began to collapse in August 2007, CNDP forces clashed with the Congolese army as they fortified strategic positions, especially around key flashpoints such as Runyoni, Bunagana, Tongo, and Nyanzale, which controlled vital transit routes to Rwanda and Uganda. The rise of rival militias, such as the Patriotes résistants congolais (PARECO), exacerbated the conflict. PARECO, which included CNDP defectors and many Hutu fighters, emerged as a significant rival, with its leaders criticizing the government army for its perceived complicity with enemy forces. By December 2007, the government launched a major offensive against the CNDP, deploying around 20,000 troops. However, the operation failed the Congolese military, culminating in a decisive CNDP victory at Mushaki on 10 December 2007.

=== Goma conference and renewed conflict ===
Map of the CNDP offensive with peak territorial control in 2008

Amid the escalating hostilities, Congolese political leaders, including Minister of Interior and Security Denis Kalume Numbi and National Assembly President Vital Kamerhe, proposed a peace conference aimed at addressing the root causes of the conflict in North and South Kivu, including ethnic reconciliation, local power struggles, and the presence of the FDLR. The Goma Conference held on 23 January 2008, attempted to facilitate a peace process by committing armed groups to a ceasefire, a general amnesty, refugee return, and army integration. However, its implementation through the Amani (Swahili for "peace") Programme encountered significant challenges, and key armed groups, including the CNDP, ultimately abandoned the process. Additionally, the peace initiative inadvertently led to the emergence of new armed groups seeking to benefit from potential political and economic incentives. By mid-2008, the peace agreement began to unravel, leading to renewed hostilities. On 26 October, the CNDP captured the Rumangabo military base, a crucial stronghold in eastern DRC. In the following days, the group expanded its control by capturing Rutshuru, Kiwanja, and a key road linking Goma and Rutshuru. On 28 August 2008, the Congolese army launched another offensive against the CNDP, but despite its numerical advantage, it suffered heavy defeats. The CNDP subsequently seized large portions of Masisi and Rutshuru territories, strategically withdrawing or pausing its advances when faced with international pressure.

By 29 October, the CNDP had taken control of Rutshuru and Kiwanja with little opposition from government troops, Mai-May militias, or MONUC peacekeepers. Once in command, CNDP fighters ordered the destruction of IDP camps, including Kasasa and Nyongera, stating they did not want such settlements within their territory. They instructed displaced persons to take whatever remained—plastic sheeting, wooden frames, and abandoned belongings. CNDP soldiers either directly participated in or supervised the demolitions. Many shelters, especially in Nyongera, Kasasa, and other sites in Rutshuru, were burned down, forcing civilians to flee once again. As government forces retreated, looting became widespread, fueling fears of a CNDP march on Goma. Despite its military advantage, the CNDP declared a unilateral ceasefire instead of entering the city. However, the Congolese government did not reciprocate, and hostilities between the CNDP, government forces, and pro-government militias, including PARECO and various Mai-May groups, persisted. On 30 October, the CNDP formally took charge of Kiwanja and, on 31 October, appointed Jules Simpenzwe as the new territorial administrator. Military analysts later suggested that the CNDP's primary objective in its late October offensive was Rutshuru rather than Goma. At midday on 4 November, roughly 200 Mai-May fighters, including members of the Jérémie Group from northern Rutshuru Territory and elements of the Mai-May PARECO Kasareka group based north of Kiwanja, launched a sudden assault on CNDP positions in Kiwanja. Among them were at least 30 child soldiers. Armed with AK-47s, spears, machetes, and a few rocket-propelled grenades, they succeeded in temporarily expelling CNDP forces from the town. The following morning, on 5 November, the CNDP retaliated with a heavy counteroffensive, deploying mortars and rockets. Fierce clashes persisted until noon, leading to significant civilian casualties. In the Mabungo neighborhood, a mortar strike claimed the life of a woman and left her 16-year-old sister critically injured. Another explosion near Nyongera camp killed a man at his home. By the afternoon, the CNDP had reclaimed Kiwanja. In the aftermath, their forces carried out house-to-house searches, apprehending young men and teenage boys suspected of being Mai-Mai fighters.

==== Human rights violations and war crimes ====
Between 4–5 November, Human Rights Watch estimated that CNDP forces summarily executed at least 150 people in Kiwanja. Many victims had gunshot wounds to the head or injuries from machetes, spears, or clubs, suggesting extrajudicial killings rather than battlefield casualties. Among the deceased were at least 14 children, 8 women, and 7 elderly individuals. In the weeks following the CNDP's capture of Kiwanja and Rutshuru, CNDP fighters also raped at least 16 women and girls.

CNDP forces attempted to conceal the evidence of these crimes by dragging bodies into homes, locking doors, and even disposing of corpses in latrines. Satellite imagery from 4 November confirmed the destruction of IDP camps in the Rutshuru-Kiwanja area. Ntaganda was present in Kiwanja on 5 November and was later indicted by the International Criminal Court (ICC) for war crimes and crimes against humanity for actions in Ituri Province between 2002 and 2004.

Continued repression and forced recruitment

Following the 5 November massacres, CNDP forces continued to execute Kiwanja residents, with additional killings reported between 8–16 November. Many victims were shot while attempting to access farms for food or while returning to their homes. CNDP authorities also pressured displaced persons to return home, even when it was unsafe. On 9 November, Nkunda publicly declared at a rally in Rutshuru that IDP camps would not be tolerated in CNDP-controlled areas, as they could serve as hiding places for bandits.

Between 6–11 November, CNDP fighters and local authorities repeatedly ordered displaced persons to vacate makeshift camps outside the MONUC base in Kiwanja. On 11 November, local leader Cité Chef Nzaba Matabaro destroyed two shelters with a machete to enforce compliance. By the next day, nearly all displaced persons had abandoned the camp, though thousands later returned due to the lack of alternative shelter. On 27 November, CNDP soldiers raped six women and girls within the displacement camp at the MONUC base in Kiwanja. By 30 November, approximately 12,000 people had taken refuge at the base, with many lacking access to food, medical aid, or protection. The CNDP also engaged in forced recruitment, using local authorities to abduct young men and boys for military service. On 30 November, CNDP fighters kidnapped four brothers from the Mabungo neighborhood of Kiwanja. One of the children, who was ill, was later released, but the other three remained in CNDP custody. Additional executions occurred in early December, with four people killed in Rutshuru and one in Kiwanja by CNDP soldiers. Between August and December 2008, at least 415 civilians were killed, over 250 injured, and approximately 250,000 people were forced to flee, bringing the total number of displaced individuals in North Kivu to over one million. Many displaced persons faced dire conditions, with limited humanitarian assistance due to ongoing insecurity. Some attempted to return home, only to find their properties occupied or new outbreaks of violence forcing them to flee once again.

=== Ihusi agreement, Operation Umoja Wetu, 23 March 2009 agreement, and power consolidation ===
International diplomatic efforts, coupled with pressure on both Kinshasa and Kigali, ultimately led to negotiations between the DRC and Rwanda. The Ihusi Agreement, signed on 16 January 2009, was a pivotal outcome of these discussions. Prior to this, the United Nations Group of Experts on the DRC had provided evidence that the conflict in the Kivus was, in part, a proxy war, with Kinshasa backing Mai-May groups and the FDLR, while Kigali supported the CNDP. The Goma Conference further heightened the visibility Nkunda, whose increased media presence strained relations with Rwanda. His public appearances, including a widely publicized moment dancing with UN envoy Olusegun Obasanjo, were perceived as undermining Rwanda's strategic interests.

On 4 January 2009, Ntaganda announced the removal of Nkunda as the movement's leader, citing mismanagement. Nkunda, taken by surprise, was unable to counter this move. On 16 January 2009, Ntaganda publicly announced the CNDP's integration into the Congolese army in a ceremony at the Ihusi Hotel in Goma, flanked by both the Rwandan Defence Minister and the Congolese Interior Minister. While the stated goal of the Rwanda-DRC agreement was to initiate joint operations against the FDLR, the immediate priority was consolidating control over the CNDP and ensuring its integration into the Congolese military. On 22 January 2009, Nkunda crossed into Rwanda at Kabuhanga, where he was met by Rwandan officers and placed under arrest. His associates, including Colonel Sultani Makenga, were instructed to proceed with the integration process. Following Nkunda's removal, Rwandan and Congolese forces launched Operation Umoja Wetu (Swahili for "Our Unity"), deploying approximately 4,000 Rwandan troops into eastern DRC to combat the FDLR. Concurrently, former CNDP officers were integrated into the Congolese army and secured key military positions. Guarantees were provided that they would not be transferred outside the Kivus.

On 23 March 2009, the government finalized agreements with both the CNDP and other armed groups, officially integrating CNDP forces into the national military, which resulted in the dissolution of the CNDP. The key provisions of the agreement included the following:

- Integration of CNDP Forces: The agreement stipulated that the CNDP would integrate its military forces into the national army and police, while transitioning into a political party. This clause was particularly emphasized by the Congolese government, as it required the CNDP to address grievances through political rather than military means. Approximately 5,300 CNDP soldiers were incorporated into the national army, with the group securing over a quarter of high-ranking command positions in North and South Kivu.
- Redeployment of CNDP Officials: The agreement outlined the relocation of CNDP administrative officials. However, despite multiple cabinet reshuffles in Kinshasa following the agreement, the CNDP alleged that it was not granted ministerial positions. The agreement itself lacked specificity regarding the number and level of positions to be allocated. Ultimately, CNDP members were appointed to various roles, including positions within the territorial administration, a provincial ministry, and as provincial advisors.
- Repatriation of Refugees: The agreement committed the government to collaborate with the United Nations High Commissioner for Refugees (UNHCR) and neighboring states to facilitate the return of refugees. Although progress was slow, a tripartite agreement between the UNHCR, the Democratic Republic of the Congo, and Rwanda was signed on 17 February 2010. However, refugee repatriation remained limited due to security concerns, land availability, and alleged political manipulations by Congolese and former CNDP officials.
- Recognition of CNDP Military and Police Ranks: The agreement called for the formal recognition of CNDP military and police ranks. While M23 leaders cited this as a major grievance, most senior CNDP officers had their ranks confirmed in 2010. However, some lower- and mid-ranking officers did not receive the same recognition. Additionally, concerns regarding pay disparities among former CNDP commanders were raised, though these claims were contested, as several officers, including Bosco Ntaganda and Sultani Makenga, were known to have profited from illicit activities such as taxation rackets, mineral smuggling, and bank heists between 2009 and 2012.
- Follow-up Mechanisms: The agreement established a national follow-up committee, with participation from both parties and oversight by international envoys. However, the UN and African Union envoys concluded their involvement early, and Congolese-led follow-up meetings were held infrequently.

However, the integration process faced significant difficulties, with many CNDP officers maintaining substantial control in the Kivus. Operation Umoja Wetu, which followed, saw both government and rebel forces committing serious human rights violations, as attacks began to target civilians. Human Rights Watch reported over 1,400 civilians were deliberately killed between January and September 2009, mostly women, children, and the elderly. These assaults were frequently accompanied by acts of rape. In the first nine months of 2009, health centers in North and South Kivu recorded over 7,500 cases of sexual violence, nearly double the figures from 2008. The instability created by these events fueled the rise of new Congolese armed groups, many of which remain active today.

Discontent arose among former CNDP officers, particularly due to Rwandan involvement and the arrest of Nkunda, who had commanded the loyalty of many senior figures. A leading opponent to Ntaganda's leadership was Makenga, previously the commander of Rutshuru. Following Nkunda's arrest, Makenga returned from Rwanda to Rutshuru, where he conferred with senior colleagues at Rumangabo camp. However, as his forces were reluctant to engage the Rwandan units stationed in the surrounding hills, Makenga acquiesced to integration, subsequently assuming the role of deputy commander of South Kivu operations. Many officers who remained loyal to Nkunda followed Makenga to South Kivu, benefiting from his patronage. Under the integration agreement, Ntaganda and his allies secured significant power, with Ntaganda being appointed deputy commander of government offensives against the FDLR and other insurgent groups. This enabled him to exert considerable influence, appointing former CNDP commanders to key military and administrative positions in the Kivu region. The CNDP also gained control over mineral-rich areas, including Nyabibwe, Bisie, and Bibatama, and later expanded their dominance over additional mining territories.

=== Ethnic tensions and internal conflict ===
Ethnic divisions within the CNDP became increasingly pronounced, with many officers accusing Ntaganda of favoring people from his Gogwe Tutsi sub-group and former comrades from his time in Ituri. In an effort to consolidate his authority, Ntaganda secured the release of his close ally, Colonel Innocent "India Queen" Kaina, from a Kinshasa prison, and welcomed several Gogwe commanders from the Rwandan army into his ranks. Discontent over ethnic favoritism led to internal discord; in one notable instance, a dispute over timber trade profits escalated into a confrontation at a Goma hotel, prompting some officers—including Lieutenant Colonel Emmanuel Nsengiyumva and Major Charles Rusigiza—to defect to the Forces Patriotiques pour la Libération du Congo (FPLC), a multi-ethnic group in Rutshuru that opposed the Rwandan government. In February 2010, General Kayumba Nyamwasa, a former head of the Rwandan army, fled to South Africa, where he survived an assassination attempt months later. His defection led to a crackdown on suspected dissenters within the Rwandan military, as he and other exiled officers established the Rwandan National Congress (RNC), an opposition movement. Kayumba maintained ties with certain CNDP officers, some of whom had served under him in the Rwandan army between 1990 and 1996. Following Nkunda's arrest, he sought to establish a new alliance and exploit divisions within Rwanda's political and military elite in hopes of inciting a coup d'état against President Paul Kagame. In response, Ntaganda, in coordination with Rwandan security forces, suppressed opposition figures within the CNDP. On 20 June 2010, Denis Ntare Semadwinga, a prominent figure within the Congolese Tutsi community and a close political advisor to Nkunda, was assassinated in Gisenyi. His murder was soon followed by the targeted killings of several other Nkunda loyalists, including Major Antoine Balibuno, Emerita Munyashwe, Patrice Habarurema, and Olivier Muhindo.

As Ntaganda consolidated his control, Kigali installed proxies to lead the CNDP's political wing, initially appointing Desiré Kamanzi and later, in December 2009, Philippe Gafishi—both of whom had established their careers in Rwanda rather than the Kivu region. When Gafishi's deputy attempted to establish a new CNDP faction in May 2010, he was arrested by Rwandan security forces. The influence of Ntaganda further expanded following the injury of General Dieudonné Amuli, Kinshasa's overall military commander, in a plane crash in July 2011, granting Ntaganda significant authority over military operations and appointments in the Kivu region. Despite the formal integration of the CNDP into the FARDC, many of its members continued to manipulate the process to their advantage. Some Rwandan nationals, including officers with no prior affiliation to the CNDP, were integrated into the Congolese army under false pretenses. Additionally, the CNDP grossly exaggerated its membership numbers, inflating a legitimate force of 5,276 soldiers to more than double that figure in order to misappropriate salaries and food rations while continuing recruitment efforts. These internal fractures within the CNDP mirrored broader divisions within the Rwandan government.

=== Mutiny of the March 23 Movement ===
The Congolese government initially viewed the CNDP's integration into the national army as a short-term solution. However, the integration process inadvertently strengthened the CNDP leadership, allowing its members to accumulate wealth and consolidate power by co-opting officers from other armed groups. Ntaganda profited significantly from mineral smuggling, embezzlement, and illicit taxation schemes. Efforts by the Congolese government to deploy former CNDP commanders outside the Kivu provinces began in September 2010 but faced resistance. The ex-rebels justified their refusal by citing security threats, anti-Tutsi discrimination, and ongoing tensions with the FDLR. In response, Ntaganda strengthened ties with former PARECO members—historical rivals of the CNDP. Discussions held in Minova, on the shores of Lake Kivu in late 2010, aimed at uniting marginalized officers who opposed what they saw as corruption within the Congolese military leadership.

The government attempted to curb CNDP influence through a regimentation process initiated in February 2011, aiming to standardize military units and eliminate parallel command structures. However, the initiative backfired, further entrenching Ntaganda's network as he placed loyalists in key command positions. Throughout this period, ex-CNDP elements leveraged Kinshasa's administrative disarray to maintain their influence. Internal divisions within the ex-CNDP contributed to a mutiny as attempts at reconciliation failed and tensions persisted between Ntaganda and Makenga while the Congolese government sought to promote Colonel Innocent Gahizi as a counterbalance to Ntaganda exacerbating factionalism. The UN predicted in a December 2011 report that former CNDP, PARECO, and Forces Républicaines Fédéralistes (FRF) members feared that upcoming elections in 2011 and 2012 would threaten their positions within FARDC. To secure their influence, these groups strategically positioned officers in key command roles through the regimentation process. Following the controversial November 2011 elections, which were marred by fraud, international donors saw an opportunity to push for reforms. Kinshasa explicitly sought to dismantle ex-CNDP networks, as evidenced by a February 2012 meeting between President Kabila's advisor, Katumba Mwanke, and Rwandan officials. The Congolese government proposed economic incentives in exchange for Rwandan support in deploying ex-CNDP officers elsewhere in the country.

The first mutiny attempt in January 2012 in Bukavu failed. The government subsequently tested officers' loyalty by summoning ex-CNDP troops to military parades and army reform seminars. Ntaganda, recognizing the threat, refused to comply. Meanwhile, the International Criminal Court (ICC) intensified its focus on Ntaganda, particularly after the conviction of Thomas Lubanga Dyilo in March 2012 for recruiting child soldiers. In response, ex-CNDP officers held clandestine meetings, leading to defections in North and South Kivu. These initial defections were largely unsuccessful as many soldiers were frustrated feeling that their commanders were amassing wealth while they received nothing. Of the 365 mutineers in South Kivu, most were either captured or chose to return to the Congolese army. A new wave of defections in North Kivu collapsed, with several commanders surrendering while others retreated into the Masisi highlands, where they urgently recruited new fighters. On 8 April 2012, Congolese and Rwandan officials met in Gisenyi to discuss the situation. An agreement was reached allowing Ntaganda to remain in Masisi while an integration commission addressed the fate of defectors. However, President Kabila reversed this decision the following day, declaring that deserters would face military justice and that ex-CNDP troops would be redeployed nationwide. This reversal alienated Rwanda, which, according to testimonies from Ugandan officials and M23 defectors, had been tacitly involved in the mutiny since 2011. By mid-April 2012, Rwanda began providing overt support to M23 to prevent its dissolution.

Under increasing military pressure, the mutineers relocated from Masisi to positions near the Rwandan border on 4 May 2012. Rwanda facilitated their retreat, and on 6 May, Makenga and his officers formally defected, later joining Ntaganda. Two days later, M23 publicly announced its formation, citing the Congolese government's failure to implement the 23 March 2009 peace agreement. The group's political leadership primarily consisted of former CNDP members, with Jean-Marie Runiga Lugerero as its political coordinator, alongside individuals allegedly appointed under Rwandan influence. M23's rebellion led to significant displacement. On 20 November 2012, the group seized Goma. However, following diplomatic intervention by the International Conference on the Great Lakes Region (ICGLR), M23 withdrew from Goma in exchange for negotiations with the Congolese government. By late 2012, Congolese forces, supported by MONUSCO, reclaimed the city. M23 subsequently declared a ceasefire and expressed willingness to engage in peace talks.

A United Nations investigation concluded that Rwanda had created and commanded M23. Under international pressure and facing military defeat by Congolese and UN forces in 2013, Rwanda withdrew its support, leading to M23's collapse. However, remnants of the group resumed low-level insurgency in 2017. In 2022, M23 reorganized and launched a renewed offensive.

== Financial and military support ==
=== Military support and recruitment ===
A 2008 United Nations Security Council-commissioned report revealed that CNDP had active representatives in Kigali, Rwanda, and Kampala, Uganda, where they engaged with diplomatic officials and other actors. Many of its supporters contributed voluntarily, often driven by ideological motivations, particularly within the Congolese Tutsi diaspora, which provided a significant base of support. CNDP also utilized digital platforms for propaganda and fundraising. It operated two websites—www.kivupeace.org and www.cndp-congo.org—which provided pro-CNDP news updates and countered accusations of human rights abuses leveled against the group by the United Nations and international human rights organizations. These websites functioned as tools for public relations and financial contributions, with Kivupeace.org featuring a PayPal donation link, while cndp-congo.org offered a membership form for supporters to join and contribute. Several CNDP leaders maintained email accounts linked to these websites, facilitating communication with supporters and coordinating international backing.

Militarily, CNDP relied heavily on capturing weapons and ammunition from FARDC during combat operations. The group seized substantial arms stockpiles during offensives, including at Kikuku and Mushaki in December 2007, Rumangabo in October 2008, and Katsiro in September 2008, where it required multiple trucks to transport looted weapons. The captured arsenal included mortars, machine guns, rocket launchers, AK-47 assault rifles, and large quantities of ammunition. In early November 2008, CNDP reportedly seized up to 12 FARDC ammunition trucks in Rutshuru town. CNDP's military operations were further aided by corruption within FARDC, which facilitated arms transfers and logistical support. Some FARDC high-ranking officers were suspected of complicity, including Colonel Rigobert Manga, commander of the 7th integrated brigade, who was suspended and investigated for alleged insurrectionist affiliations following CNDP's seizure of Nyanzale in September 2008.

CNDP received logistical and material support from external sources, including shipments of military uniforms from Rwanda. Several former combatants testified that they were issued new uniforms with Rwandan flags. CNDP official Vincent Mwambutsa, an uncle of Laurent Nkunda, was reported to have delivered a truckload of uniforms to Bunagana from Uganda. In October 2008, Rwandan security services intercepted a shipment of uniforms at Kigali International Airport, originating from Boston, Massachusetts, United States, leading to the arrest of several individuals. There were also unconfirmed reports of ammunition shipments reaching CNDP through Rwanda and Uganda.

=== Financing ===
CNDP secured financial support through frequent meetings held in cities across Africa, Europe, and North America, including Kigali, Goma, Gisenyi, Kampala, Johannesburg, and Arusha. During these gatherings, supporters voluntarily contributed funds, which were deposited into bank accounts managed by CNDP agents in Rwanda. These accounts facilitated cash withdrawals, allowing intermediaries to transfer money directly to the movement's leadership. Several Tutsi businessmen in Goma contributed funds, food, and even vehicles to CNDP, either as a gesture of support or to maintain influence over the rebel group. In some cases, businesses were strongly encouraged—if not outright coerced—into making financial contributions under threat of retaliation. Several mineral-exporting companies, transport firms, and fuel businesses served as fronts for CNDP interests. Within CNDP-controlled territories, the rebel movement established a taxation system that generated substantial revenue. Households were required to contribute agricultural goods. A housing levy was also enacted, with tariffs ranging from $5 to $10 annually for rudimentary mud or straw dwellings, and escalating to $20 for structures adorned with corrugated iron roofing. Small business owners were liable to an annual tax ranging from $30 to $50, while additional poll taxes were levied on the local population. The group also commandeered several lucrative charcoal markets, notably those in the vicinity of Burungu and Kitchanga. Another significant source of revenue was road tolls. Fees for vehicles using CNDP-controlled roads, such as the Sake-Masisi and Sake-Mweso routes, surged from $60–$100 per small truck before August 2008 to over $400 per truck afterward. CNDP's key financier backer, Tribert Rujugiro Ayabatwa, was a Rwandan presidential advisor and the founder of the government-backed Rwandan Investment Group. In October 2008, he was detained in London on a South African tax evasion warrant, with an extradition hearing set for 28 November 2008. His involvement in CNDP went beyond just funding; he was also a major landowner in areas controlled by CNDP, including large cattle ranches in Kilolirwe, where CNDP leader Laurent Nkunda set up his military base. These commercial ventures and financial networks helped sustain CNDP's influence and military operations.

=== Natural resources ===
The Bibatama Mining Concession in Masisi Territory, located a few kilometers from Rubaya, also became a key asset for CNDP's finances. CNDP clashed with the FARDC and PARECO (Patriotes Résistants Congolais) for control of the mine, which was eventually secured by the rebel group. The mine, which produced coltan, was monitored by CNDP, with key businessmen such as Édouard Mwangachuchu, a Tutsi national senator, facilitating the export of coltan through his comptoir, Mwangachuchu Hizi International (MHI). Mwangachuchu, with the consent of Nkunda, continued operations at the mine, paying a fee of $0.20 per kilogram of coltan exported through CNDP checkpoints. Mwangachuchu was also involved in a land dispute with Bayose Senkoke, a local businessman, with CNDP siding with Senkoke. Senkoke, in turn, partnered with Mboni Habarugira, a Tutsi official from the OCC (Office Congolais de Contrôle) in Goma, to exploit part of the concession. The products from this joint venture were sold to MUNSAD, a comptoir run by Damien Munyarugerero, a businessman known for his proximity to CNDP. Munyarugerero had substantial business interests in CNDP-controlled areas, including over 600 hectares of ranch land. In 2008, MUNSAD began exporting coltan, which was sold to Trademet, a Belgian company that pre-financed the comptoir for several years. The Bibatama mine itself produced hundreds of kilograms of coltan ore each week, making it a significant economic asset for CNDP.

=== Rwandan government ===
Rwandan officials were reportedly complicit in recruiting CNDP soldiers, including minors. From January 2007 to October 2008, MONUC repatriated more than 150 Rwandan nationals, including 29 children, after deserting the CNDP forces. The majority of these recruits were enlisted in Rwanda by civilian individuals, both Rwandan and Congolese, many of whom had previously served in the Rwandan military. These recruits were promised large financial incentives, but upon arrival in the DRC, they faced poor living conditions and received no remuneration. Rwandan officials were reported to have facilitated this recruitment process, with recruits crossing the border with minimal checks from Rwandan immigration services. Some recruits passed through Goma before continuing to training camps in Masisi, while others traversed the Volcanoes National Park in Rwanda, which borders the DRC. The Rwandan army maintained a base near the park in Kinigi and regularly patrolled the area but did not intervene to stop the flow of CNDP recruits. Rwandan military trucks were also used to transport new recruits from areas such as Ruhengeri to Gisenyi, from where they crossed the border by foot.

Rwandan military units and officers were directly involved in CNDP operations within the DRC. Rwandan forces, including small units, were seen crossing into the DRC to support CNDP advances, following specific routes through the Volcanoes National Park. The infiltration routes, which involved passing through key locations such as Kabara, Bukima, and Runyoni, indicated a well-coordinated effort to assist CNDP in military operations. CNDP leadership frequently communicated with senior officials in the Rwandan military and government. Satellite phone records, as reported by the United Nations Group of Experts on DRC, show numerous calls between CNDP and Rwandan Defence Force (RDF) leadership, as well as the Rwandan presidency. This support was particularly evident during CNDP's offensives in 2008, including the capture of key military positions such as the Rumangabo military camp, which was reportedly facilitated by RDF assistance.

Despite public declarations, such as the Nairobi Communiqué, in which Rwanda pledged to prevent CNDP activities within its territory, the support provided to CNDP continued throughout the period. On 25–26 October 2008, at least two Rwandan armored divisions were strategically positioned at the Kabuhanga border crossing, which overlooks the Kibumba refugee camp and is positioned near the Kanyamahoro command post of the FARDC's 83rd brigade. Tank fire from this position had the potential to reach FARDC positions. On the same dates, military personnel were sighted infiltrating Congolese territory through the Kikeri and Mashahi forested areas, providing reinforcement to CNDP as it pressed its offensive toward Goma. This external support was pivotal in CNDP's efforts to capture Rumangabo military camp for a second time in October 2008, while sustaining their territorial expansion toward Goma. During the CNDP's renewed offensive on 28 October 2008, joint MONUC and FARDC contingents successfully repelled their advance near the Kibumba internally displaced persons' camp. However, on 29 October 2008, CNDP launched another offensive, bolstered by external support, with greater firepower on both its southern and northern fronts. MONUC officers and foreign journalists who were present in the field reported witnessing tank and mortar fire originating from the Rwandan border in support of CNDP. Additionally, an attack helicopter deployed by MONUC in the Kibumba area came under anti-aircraft fire, which appeared to come from the direction of the Rwandan border. On 9 November 2008, Ntaganda, was seen crossing the Kabuhanga border with a dozen soldiers, entering a neutral zone between the Rwandan and Congolese borders. This zone was located near Rwanda. Beyond direct military involvement, Rwanda served as a rear base for CNDP operations. CNDP leaders maintained financial connections with Rwanda, including bank accounts used for financing their activities. Several CNDP officials had families and residences in Rwanda, and regular meetings were held with foreign embassies there. The CNDP leadership also relied on Rwandan telecommunication infrastructure for coordination. They used a series of Rwandacell telephone numbers for communication, and until September 2008, these phones operated on the Supercell network, which had coverage in Masisi and Rutshuru. CNDP representatives in Rwanda facilitated the purchase and transfer of credit for these phones. CNDP also utilized satellite phones, one of which was issued to a person named Lambert Amahoro, based in Kigali, and trucks registered in Rwanda were used to supply CNDP with fuel and other goods.

Following his integration into the Congolese army in 2009, Ntaganda retained de facto dominion over key mining sites, encompassing the Mungwe and Fungamwaka mines near Numbi, as well as extensive extractive operations at Nyabibwe in South Kivu. In Rubaya, he established a taxation network through a parallel police structure, generating significant revenue from the region's mining activities. Ntaganda also had commercial interests beyond mineral smuggling. He owned a fuel station, S. Petrol Congo, near the Goma International Airport and large farms in Ngungu, North Kivu. His extensive economic networks enabled him to finance further armed activities, culminating in his leadership of the March 23 Movement (M23) in 2012. This rebel group, bankrolled and armed by Rwandan, captured key strategic towns, including Rubaya, Kitchanga, Kilolirwe, Mushaki, Kingi, and temporarily Goma.
