= Sultani Makenga =

Congolese rebel leader and military chief of M23

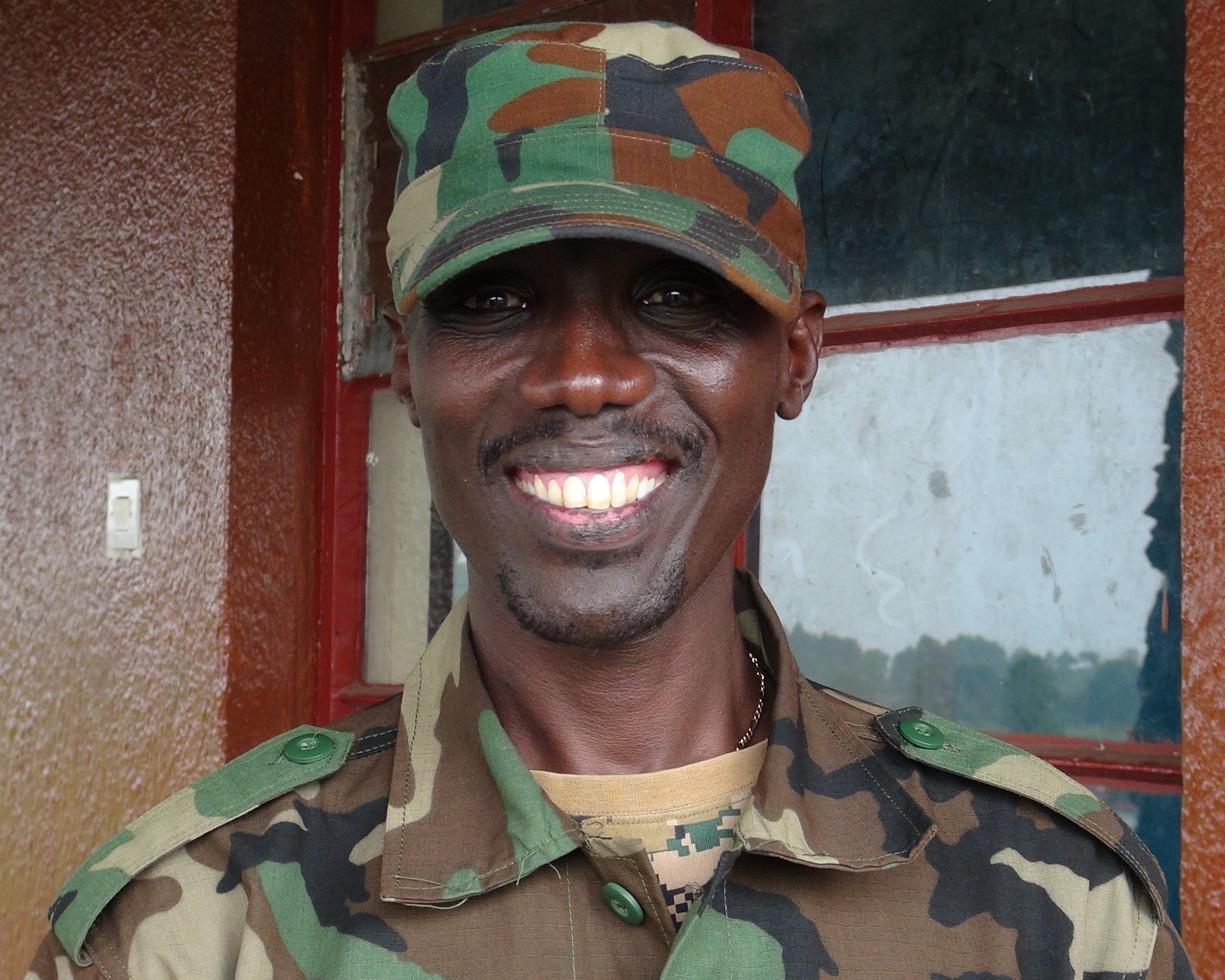
- Makenga in 2013
- Born: December 25, 1973 (age 52); Rutshuru, North Kivu, Zaire (now Democratic Republic of the Congo)
- Military career
- Allegiance: RPF (1990–1994) (Democratic Republic of the Congo) AFDL (1996–1998); RCD (1998–2003); CNDP (until 2009); March 23 Movement (2012–present)
- Service years: 1990–present
- Rank: Major general
- Conflicts: Rwandan Civil War; First Congo War; Second Congo War; Kivu conflict; 2008 Nord-Kivu campaign; M23 rebellion; M23 offensive (2022); 2025 Bukavu offensive; 2025 Uvira offensive; 2025 Walikale offensive

Sultani Makenga (born 25 December 1973) is a Congolese rebel leader and the military chief of the March 23 Movement (M23), a rebel group based in the eastern Democratic Republic of the Congo.

== Early life and initial rebel career ==
Sultani Makenga was born on 25 December 1973, in the town of Rutshuru, North Kivu province, located in the eastern part of the Congo. He is an ethnic Tutsi.

He joined the Rwandan Patriotic Front (RPF) in 1990 and fought in the Rwandan Civil War. Makenga also took part in several Congolese conflicts during the mid-1990s and 2000s, including the First and Second Congo Wars, and the CNDP rebellion that occurred during the first phases of the Kivu conflict.

== M23 rebellions (2012-present) ==
Sanctions were introduced against him by the United Nations Security Council in November 2012. This was quickly followed by further sanctions from the United States for recruiting of child soldiers. He has denied that M23 used child soldiers, characterizing the accusations from those such as Human Rights Watch as propaganda. He has denied accusations that the M23 rebellion is backed by Rwanda. His faction of the M23 has clashed with those loyal to its political leader, Jean-Marie Runiga Lugerero. In May 2013, the M23 clashed with FARDC (Armed Forces of the Democratic Republic of the Congo), and there were rumors that Makenga was badly wounded.

On November 7, 2013, after the M23 triumph the Congolese military backed by the UN FIB (Force Intervention Brigade), Makenga decide to retreat with hundreds of M23 fighters in Mgahinga National Park, Uganda. He and his troops were held in a secret location.

In November 2016, Makenga left a demobilization camp in Uganda, and his whereabouts became unknown. In early 2017, he tried to restart a guerilla war in the DRC with 200 men and succeeded, and some of his former militants were even hired by the Congolese government to crush protests.

According to a 2024 report from the UN group of experts, he was traveling to Uganda and received active support for the M23 from the Ugandan military. In August 2024, Makenga was sentenced to death in absentia by a Congolese military court.

== See also ==
- Bertrand Bisimwa
- Bosco Ntaganda
- Jean-Marie Runiga Lugerero
