= M23 rebellion =

M23 rebellion or M23 campaign may refer to:

- M23 rebellion (2012–2013), an armed conflict in North Kivu, Democratic Republic of the Congo
- M23 campaign (2022–present), an offensive in North Kivu against the Armed Forces of the Democratic Republic of the Congo

== See also ==
- March 23 Movement
