= Denis Kalume Numbi =

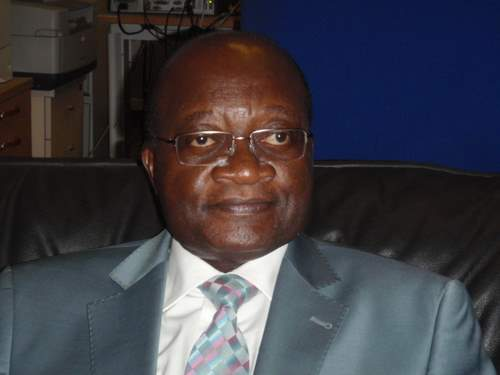
- Kalume on 16 March 2010

Minister of Planning and Reconstruction
- In office 2001 – 11 November 2002

Minister of State for the Interior, Decentralization and Security
- In office 5 February 2007 – 10 October 2008
- Succeeded by: Célestin Mbuyu Kabanga (Interior); Antipas Mbusa Nyamwisi (Decentralization)

Denis Kalume Numbi is a general and a politician in the Democratic Republic of the Congo (DRC). He was part of the Antoine Gizenga government as Minister of State for the Interior, Decentralization and Security. He was replaced in this position on 26 October 2008 by Celestin Mbuyu Kabango when the government headed by Adolphe Muzito was formed.

In June 2018 he was named DRC Ambassador to Russia.

== Military career ==
Kalume Numbi was among the company of Major General Lukama Marcellin, the 106th All Weapons TAW, the Royal Military Academy of Belgium. In 1998 president Laurent Kabila appointed him to establish the "National Service", bringing together military and civilians with the goal of agricultural production to alleviate the food shortages of the population, training young people to trades such as masonry and electrical work, and to provide basic military training. In 1999 he opened centers for the pilot project at Kaniama and Kasese in the South-West province of Katanga.

== Political career ==
Kalume Numbi left the National Service project to join the various governments of Laurent-Desire Kabila. In January 2001 he was one of the officials who organized the funeral of Laurent Kabila, who was killed in his office at the marble palace in Kinshasa. He returned to the government as Minister of Planning and Reconstruction for President Joseph Kabila. He was suspended from duty on 11 November 2002, following the publication by the United Nations of the Kassem report on looting of natural resources in the Democratic Republic of Congo. In this report his name was mentioned alongside those of Mwenze Kongolo (Minister of Security and Public Order), Augustin Katumba Mwanke (Minister in the Presidency), Mwana Nanga Mawampanga (Ambassador to Zimbabwe), Didier Kazadi Nyembwe (general manager at the National Intelligence Agency ) and Jean Charles Okoto Lolakombe (managing director General of the Societé Minière de Bakwanga "MIBA").

During the crisis in the east Kalume returned as military advisor to President Joseph Kabila.

In February 2007 Kalume was appointed Minister of State for the Interior, Decentralization and Security in the government of Prime Minister Antoine Gizenga. In March 2007 he was involved in a dispute over some villages on the border occupied by the Angolan army. The unsuccessful candidate for the presidency in 2006, Jean-Pierre Bemba, claimed the villages belonged to the DRC, while Kalume said they belonged to Angola. In October 2007 Kalume presented a bill for Decentralization in the National Assembly. The subsequent debate turned up a variety of issues that first had to be addressed with changes to related laws. In August 2008 the mayor of Lubumbashi in the Katanga copper belt imposed restrictions on the movement of people into the city. After a storm of protest, Kalume ordered cancellation of the measures, which he said only his ministry could impose.

In September 2008, with continued fighting between the Laurent Nkunda's CNDP militia and FARDC in South Kivu, Kalume called on the United Nations peacekeepers of MONUC to enforce peace by implementing Chapter 7 of the UN Charter without delay. In October 2008 he was seeking help from the heads of state of the Southern African Development Community in resolving the ongoing fighting in the eastern DRC.

In March 2010 Kalume was Commissioner-General in charge of the celebration of the fiftieth anniversary of independence of the Democratic Republic if the Congo.
