= Édouard Mwangachuchu =

Congolese businessman and politician (born 1953)

Member of the National Assembly
- In office ?
- Constituency: Masisi, North Kivu

Member of the Senate
- In office fl. 2007

Personal details
- Born: 30 September 1953 (age 72) Rutshuru, Belgian Congo
- Occupation: Businessman, politician

Édouard Mwangachuchu Hizi (born 30 September 1953) is a Congolese businessman and politician. He is a member of the National Assembly for Masisi, North Kivu. Mwangachuchu previously served as member of the Senate. He was sentenced to death in October 2023 on charges including treason. He has appealed the sentence.

== Life ==
Mwangachuchu was born on 30 September 1953 in Rutshuru. As a politician Mwangachuchu served as an independent senator in 2007. He later became a member of the National Assembly for Masisi, North Kivu. In November 2020 he asked Minister of Mines, Willy Kitobo Samsoni, for explanations regarding the tensions in Kivu.

In 2001 Mwanganchuchu obtained his first mining license. Mwangachuchu is owner of the Bisunzu mining company (Société minière de Bisunzu, SMB), which mines coltan in the Rubaya mines. He is also president of the National Congress for the Defence of the People.

On 1 March 2023, Mwangachuchu was arrested in Kinshasa. After first being held in Makala prison he was transferred to Ndolo military prison. In August 2023 the prosecution sought life imprisonment for Mwangachuchu on grounds of treason and "participation in the M23 insurrectionary movement" (M23), while his defence sought acquittal. The case started after a cachement of weapons was found on an SMB site in the wake of an M23 offensive and counteroffensive in Rubaya. On 6 October 2023, the High Military Court, chaired by Robert Kalala, sentenced Mwangachuchu to death for those charges and "illegal possession of weapons and munitions of war". He was also sentenced to a $100 million fine to be paid within 8 days. His co-defendant, a police captain, was acquitted. His request for a release on health grounds was rejected. Mwangachuchu stated that during his trial he was threatened by both M23 and Congolese security authorities. His lawyer claimed that Mwangachuchu suffered from a ruling "based on ethnic harassment against Kinyarwanda-speaking people in North Kivu" and was medically maltreated. Mwangachuchu remained a member of the National Assembly as the competency to remove him did not lie with the High Military Court but the Constitutional Court of the Democratic Republic of the Congo. Mwangachuchu subsequently appealed his sentence at the Court of Cassation.
