= Rutshuru Airport =

- IATA: none; ICAO: FZNC

Summary
- Airport type: Public
- Serves: Rutshuru
- Elevation AMSL: 3,707 ft / 1,130 m
- Coordinates: 1°09′45″S 29°25′47″E

Map
- Location of the airport in Democratic Republic of the Congo

Runways
Direction	Length		Surface
Direction	m	ft	Surface
01/19	950	3,117	Grass
- Sources: Google Maps GCM

Rutshuru Airport (ICAO: FZNC) is an airport serving the town of Rutshuru in Democratic Republic of the Congo. The runway is 3 kilometres (2 mi) northwest of Rutshuru in the town of Kiwanja.

== See also ==
- List of airports in the Democratic Republic of the Congo
- Transport in the Democratic Republic of the Congo
