= Rumangabo =

Military base in Rutshuru Territory, DR Congo

Coordinates: 1°20′43.39″S 29°23′33.29″E

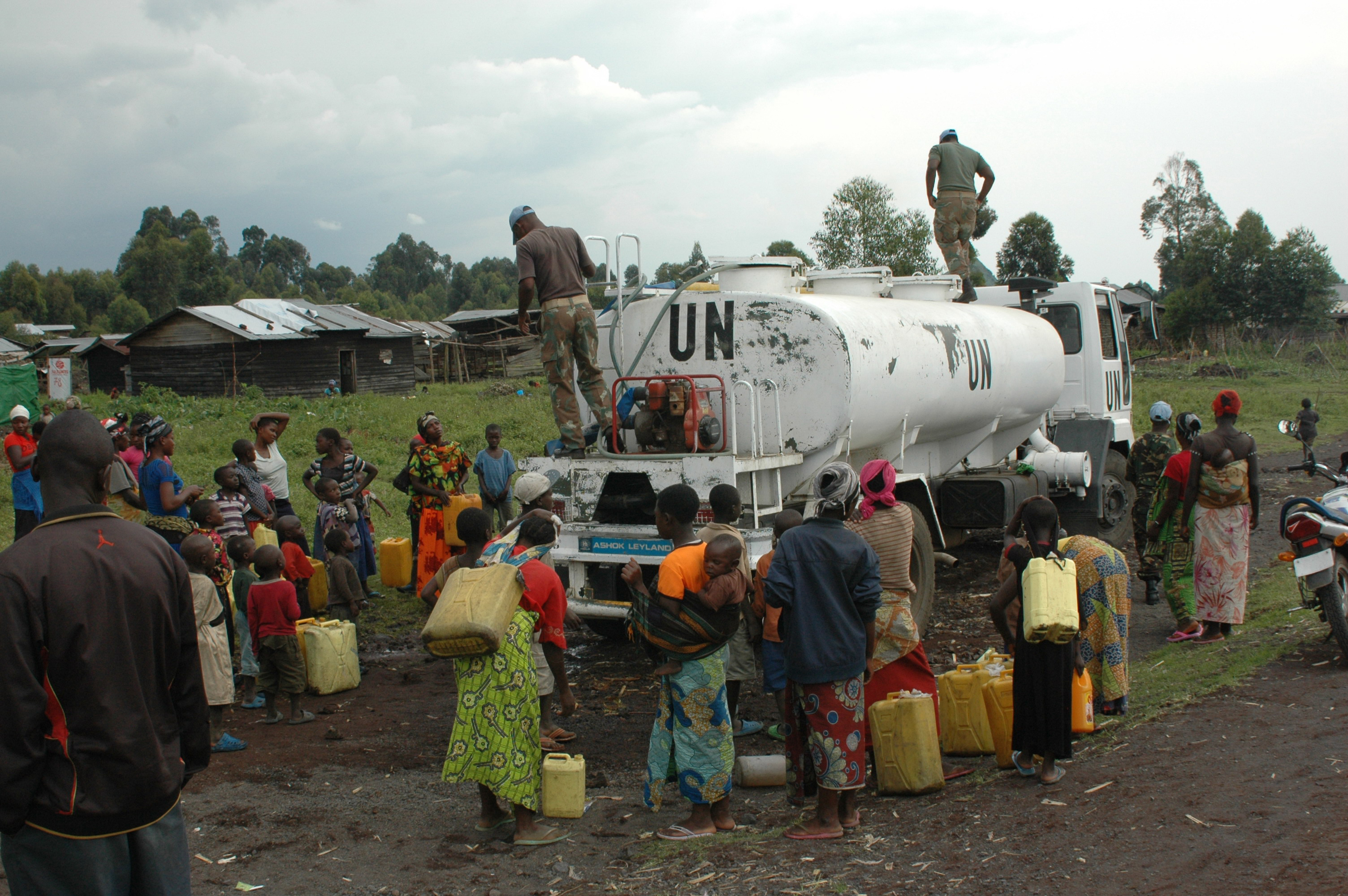
MONUSCO peacekeepers distributing drinking water to the population of the previously rebel-held locality of Rumangabo during the M23 rebellion, October 2013.

Rumangabo is a military base of the military of the Democratic Republic of the Congo in Rutshuru Territory, north of Goma in Nord Kivu province, 3.5 kilometres (2.2 mi) north of the headquarters of Virunga National Park.

During Mobutu Sese Seko's presidency, the Rumangabo base was occupied by the 411th battalion of the 41st Commando Brigade (Bde Cdo). The Rumangabo-based unit was among the Zairian troops that, in 1984, went to defend the Aouzou Strip in Chad against Ghadaffi's troops. The battalion plundered the city in December 1992.
