= Rubaya mines =

Coltan mines near Rubaya, Democratic Republic of the Congo

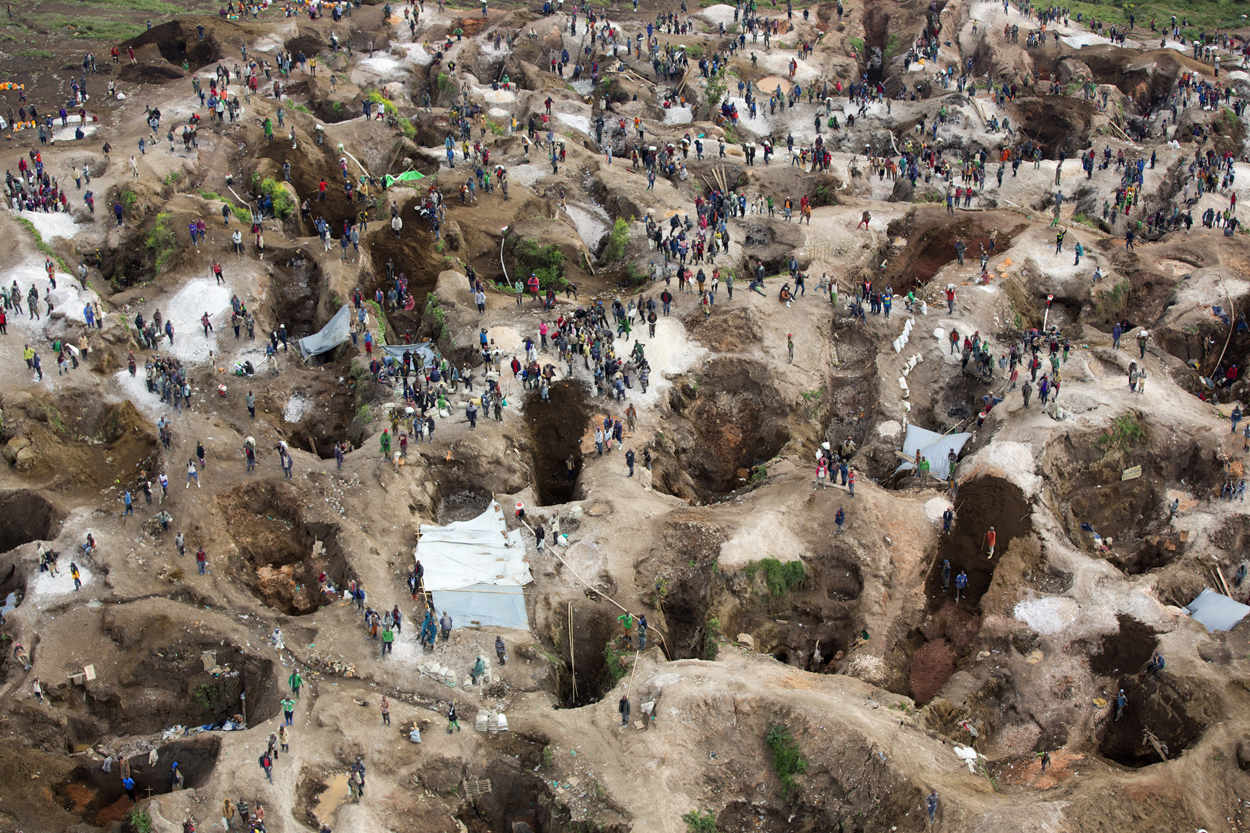
- The Luwowo coltan mine near Rubaya in March 2014.

- Location within Democratic Republic of the Congo
- Location: Masisi Territory, North Kivu, Democratic Republic of the Congo; 1.558°S 28.884°E
- Products: Coltan; Cassiterite; Tourmaline
- Company: Société Minière de Bisunzu Sarl
- Website: www.smb-sarl.com

The Rubaya mines, also known as the Bibatama Mining Concession, is a series of coltan mining sites near the town of Rubaya in Masisi Territory, North Kivu, Democratic Republic of the Congo. Officially, the mining license is held by Société Minière de Bisunzu Sarl (SMB), associated with Congolese senator Édouard Mwangachuchu. Specific sites include Bibatama D2, Luwowo, Gakombe D4, Koyi, Mataba D2, Bundjali, and Bibatama D3.

The mines are the largest coltan producer in the country, producing about 1,000 metric tons of coltan a year, about half of the DRC's total production. In April 2019, the mine employed about 3,500 artisanal miners. The mine is partially mechanized, based on reinvested mining profits. Artisanal miners work with little or no protective gear, and earn about a dollar for 14 hours of mining.

The main export from the mines is an ore concentrate which contains about 33% Ta_{2}O_{5} and 5% Nb_{2}O_{5} by weight. However, the concentrate also contains about 0.14% uranium and 0.02% thorium, which is enough naturally occurring radioactive material (NORM) to entail significant complications in handling.

== History ==
Before the First Congo War, the site was controlled by the Congolese state owned company SAKIMA. Mines in the Rubaya area were controlled by several armed groups during the conflict period, including Rally for Congolese Democracy–Goma, March 23 Movement, and National Congress for the Defence of the People (CNDP). A central figure in the mines is Édouard Mwangachuchu, an ethnic Tutsi landowner who fled the DRC in the mid-1990s in the midst of ethnic violence encouraged by the Mobutu Sese Seko administration.

Returning to the DRC from asylum in the United States, Mwangachuchu went into the mining business with Robert Sussman, an American physician. Mwangachuchu first acquired an exploration permit for the site in 1999, under the company Mwangachuchu Hizi International (MHI). The company acquired an exploitation permit in 2006, and the company was later renamed to SMB.

In 2013, SMB signed an agreement with a local collective of artisanal miners, the Coopérative des Exploitants Artisanaux Miniers de Masisi (COOPERAMMA) that allowed the diggers onto the property in exchange for SMB holding a monopoly on buying coltan extracted from the area. Mwangachuchu is the president of the National Congress for the Defence of the People, a Tutsi-aligned former militia. COOPERAMMA president Robert Seninga is associated with the Hutu-aligned Mai-Mai Nyatura.

In May 2013, a landslide occurred at Koyi-Rubaya, killing about 100 artisanal miners. MONUSCO visited the site of the disaster and advised local authorities to ban further artisanal mining in the area.

MHI was one of the first mines to apply for certification from the Federal Institute for Geosciences and Natural Resources. They joined the iTSCi traceability program in 2014. In January 2019, SMB announced the mine would be leaving the ITSCI certification scheme, citing the cost of the program. In its place, the mine began using a system of digital tracking devised by the Berlin-based RCS Global.

Despite regulations aimed at preventing conflict, the mine is subject to violence between COOPERAMMA and police hired by SMB to prevent smuggling of coltan out of the mines. Three people were killed in a 2020 incident, with SMB and COOPERAMA giving strongly diverging accounts of the circumstances. In response to concerns about the violence, RCS Global advocated for companies to continue sourcing from the mines, saying SMB were implementing changes to address the problems, and that insecurity could get worse if the mines were cut out of supply chains.

A UN Group of Experts on the DRC report submitted in June 2021 presented evidence of armed fighting and weapon distributions in Rubaya's coltan mines.

=== M23 conflict (2023–present) ===
Due to the M23 offensive reaching the area, SMB announced that mining was suspended on February 10, 2023. The FARDC withdrew from the area on February 24, and the mines were looted and briefly occupied by M23 forces, before the area was retaken by FARDC on March 1. Mwangachuchu was arrested and accused by the Congolese government of several crimes, including collaborating with the M23 and possessing weapons of war.

According to an order from the Ministry of mines, mining on the SMB concession was again ordered to be halted, but a deadly mining collapse on May 8 made clear that this order was not being followed.

Since September 2023, the Rubaya mining areas have been under the direct control of "Wazalendo" militias such as ANCDH and PARECO-FF who have allied with the governmental FARDC troops. The armed groups began collecting "protection" money from miners, with the production continuing illicitly despite a ban from North Kivu provincial authorities and the collapse of due diligence monitoring.

In April 2024, the March 23 Movement again took control of the town of Rubaya. On May 2, a spokesman from M23 said the town was "liberated" whereas an activist in Goma condemned the development as an example of "systemic plundering".

=== 2026 landslides ===
On January 28, 2026, following heavy rains, another landslide caused several mines to collapse, killing at least 400 people and injuring several others.

On 3rd March another landslide killed over 200 people, M23 said the following day.

== Location ==
The Mining area is located near the town of Rubaya, at the end of a dirt road which branches off from a main road between the towns of Sake and Walikale. The main road was built in the 2000s by the German charity Welthungerhilfe. By 2015, the road had fallen into disrepair from a lack of maintenance.

== See also ==
- Coltan mining and ethics
- Mining industry of the Democratic Republic of the Congo
- Bisie
- Numbi (town)
