= Kinigi =

- Town
- Location in Rwanda
- Coordinates: 1.44663°S 29.58749°E
- Country: Rwanda
- Province: Northern Province
- District: Musanze

Population (2012 census)
  - Total: 17,305

Audio file showing pronunciation of Ruhengeri Centre in Kinyarwanda

Kinigi is a town in Northern Province, Rwanda, with a population of 17,305 (2012 census).
