= Bertrand Bisimwa =

Congolese rebel

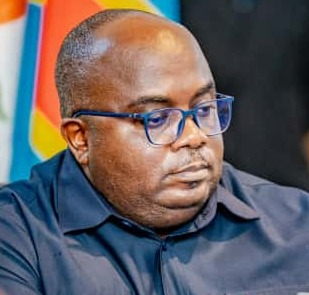
- Bisimwa in 2025

Leader of the March 23 Movement
- Incumbent
- Assumed office 2013
- Preceded by: Jean-Marie Runiga

Personal details
- Born: c. 1978 Bukavu, South Kivu, Zaire
- Military career
- Allegiance: March 23 Movement
- Service years: 2022–present
- Conflicts: M23 campaign (2022–present)

Bertrand Bisimwa (born c. 1973) is a Congolese politician and military leader who is the president of the March 23 Movement (M23) since 2013. He is known for leading rebel activities in eastern areas of the Democratic Republic of the Congo (DRC).

== Early life ==
Bertrand Bisimwa was born in c. 1973 in Bukavu, South Kivu, then part of Zaire.

== M-23 activities ==
In the early part of 2013, Bisimwa condemned the United Nations' decision to deploy a special attack force after M23 briefly captured the city of Goma. In November 2013, the armed group was defeated by the Armed Forces of the DRC (FARDC) backed by the United Nations Force Intervention Brigade (FIB). The government forces captured the remaining M23 strongholds. The group declared a ceasefire after a 20-month uprising and Bisimwa announced troop disarmament, demobilization, and reintegration according to terms that he said would be agreed with the government of Congo. He would later claim that his group came under fire after the ceasefire declaration. He also accused the Congolese military of killing suspected M23 members from May 2012 to August 2013. Bisimwa fled to Uganda through the Bunagana border crossing.

Bisimwa was also identified as one of the leaders of the new rebel group called M27, which emerged in 2015 and is composed of members of the National Congress for the Defence of the People (CNDP) and M23 defectors.

== International Sanctions ==
After the clashes between the Rwanda-backed M23 rebels and the Congolese Armed Forced intensified resulting in the capture of Goma, the capital of the North Kivu region, the EU Council moved to impose sanctions on the leadership of the rebellion coalition as well as some top Rwandan political and military officials, supporting the movement, citing recent reports of grave human rights abuses and acts of violence aimed against the civilian population of Goma and other occupied areas in North Kivu. Bisimwa as the president of the March 23 Movement was placed on the sanctions list under the EU's DRC sanctions regime, subjecting him to an asset freeze and a travel ban.

== See also ==
- Jean-Marie Runiga Lugerero
