= Laurent Nkunda =

Congolese military officer and warlord

- Born: 2 February 1967 (age 59); Mutanda, Rutshuru, Congo-Léopoldville
- Military career
- Allegiance: RPF (1994); AFDL (1996–1998); RCD (1998–2003); Democratic Republic of the Congo (2003–2004); CNDP (2004–2009)
- Branch: Congolese Army
- Service years: 1994–2009
- Rank: General
- Conflicts: Rwandan Civil War; First Congo War; Second Congo War; Kivu conflict; 2008 Nord-Kivu campaign

Laurent Nkunda Mihigo (born Laurent Nkundabatware; February 2, 1967) is a Congolese former military officer and warlord who operated in the North Kivu Province during the Kivu conflict.

Nkunda, who is a Congolese Tutsi, initially fought as a rebel fighter in the Rwandan Civil War alongside the forces of the Rwandan Patriotic Front (RPF) against the genocidal Hutu-led government in Rwanda. In 1996, he returned to the Congo and joined Laurent Kabila's AFDL forces during the First Congo War. However, he later rebelled against Kabila's government and joined the rebellion led by Rwandan-aligned rebels during the Second Congo War. Following the end of the Second Congo War, he was integrated into the Congolese Army in 2003 but would again later rebel against the government, marking the beginning of the Kivu conflict.

On January 22, 2009, he was put under house arrest in Gisenyi when he was called for a meeting to plan a joint operation between the Congolese and Rwandan militaries.

== Early life ==
Laurent Nkunda was born on February 2, 1967, at the village of Mutanda, located in eastern Congo. Prior to his rebel career, Nkunda studied psychology at the Kisangani University, and then became a school teacher in Kichanga.

== Rebel and military career ==
=== Rwandan Civil War ===
During the Rwandan genocide, which broke out amid the Rwandan Civil War, Nkunda traveled to Rwanda, joining the Tutsi-led Rwandan Patriotic Front (RPF) who were fighting against the Rwandan Armed Forces (FAR), the military of the genocidal Hutu-led government.

=== First and Second Congo Wars ===
After the RPF defeated and overthrew the Hutu-led regime in Rwanda to become the new government of Rwanda, Nkunda returned to the Congo (then named Zaire). During the First Congo War, he fought alongside AFDL rebels led by Laurent-Désiré Kabila, who overthrew Mobutu Sese Seko.

At the outset of the Second Congo War, Nkunda joined and became a major in the Congolese Rally for Democracy (RCD) rebel group, fighting on the side of Rwandan, Ugandan, Burundian, and other rebel forces.

=== Formation of a rebel government ===
In 2003, with the official end to war, Nkunda was integrated into the national army of the Transitional Government of the Democratic Republic of the Congo as a colonel and by 2004, he was promoted to general and commanded the 81st and 83rd brigades of the Congolese Army. However, he soon rejected the authority of the government and defected with some former RCD-Goma rebel fighters to the Masisi forests in North Kivu, where he raised the flag of rebellion against the government of Joseph Kabila (who had succeeded his father in 2001). Nkunda claimed to be defending the interests of the Tutsi minority in eastern Congo who were subjected to attacks by Hutus, who had fled after their involvement with the Rwandan genocide.

In August 2007, the area under Nkunda's control lay north of Lake Kivu in Nord-Kivu in the territories of Masisi and Rutshuru. In this area, Nkunda established his headquarters by building necessary infrastructure and developing institutions of order. He established a political organisation known as the National Congress for the Defence of the People (CNDP). As of 2026, the CNDP has evolved into a rebel organization is known as M23.

Nkunda was likely usurped in leadership by fellow general Bosco Ntaganda, who became the new representative of the group. The two might have had a falling out over a massacre of civilians perpetrated by Ntaganda's forces.

=== 2008 Nord-Kivu campaign ===
In fighting that began on 27 October 2008, known as the 2008 Nord-Kivu campaign, Nkunda led CNDP rebels who fought against both the Congolese government forces, FDLR militias, and United Nations forces of the 17,000 UN contingent in the country. It was reported that he was advancing on the city of Goma with the aim of capturing it, with the Congolese army claiming he was receiving aid from Rwanda.

The fighting uprooted 200,000 civilians, bringing the total number of people displaced by the Kivu conflict to 2 million, causing civil unrest large food shortages and what the United Nations calls "a humanitarian crisis of catastrophic dimensions."

In an interview with the BBC on November 10, 2008, Nkunda threatened to topple the government of the Democratic Republic of Congo if the president, Joseph Kabila, continued to avoid direct negotiations.

== Human rights abuse accusations ==
Throughout the years, Nkunda has come under scrutiny and been accused by a number of organizations of committing human rights abuses. Nkunda was indicted by the Congolese government for war crimes in September 2005.

According to human rights monitors such as Refugees International, Nkunda's troops have been alleged to have committed acts of murder, rape, and pillaging of civilian villages; a charge which Nkunda denies. Amnesty International says his troops have abducted children as young as 12 and forced them to serve as child soldiers.

In May 2002, he was accused of massacring 160 people in Kisangani during the Second Congo War, prompting UN Human Rights Commissioner Mary Robinson to call for his arrest following the abduction and beating of two UN investigators by his troops. He has claimed that the UN have ignored the widespread attacks on Tutsis in the region as they did during the Rwandan genocide in 1994.

=== Child soldiers ===
The United Nations has identified Nkunda's CNDP as being one of the main groups responsible for the recruitment of child soldiers in the Congo. Nkunda denies these allegations, stating that as of 2005 he has demobilised 2,500 "young soldiers". His total army was estimated at 7,000–8,000 men.

== Post-rebel leadership activities ==
=== Arrest ===
Nkunda was arrested on 22 January 2009 after he had crossed into Rwanda. After unsuccessfully attempting to defeat the CNDP militarily, Congolese president Kabila made a deal with President Paul Kagame of Rwanda to allow Rwandan soldiers into the DRC to uproot FDLR militants in exchange for Rwanda removing Nkunda. A military spokesperson said he had been seized after sending three battalions to repel an advance by a joint Congolese-Rwandan force. The force was part of a joint Congolese-Rwandan operation which was launched to hunt Rwandan Hutu militiamen operating in DR Congo. Nkunda is currently being held at an undisclosed location in Rwanda. A Rwandan military spokesman has claimed, however, that Nkunda is being held at Gisenyi, a city in Rubavu district in the Western Province of Rwanda.

On 26 March 2010, the Rwandan Supreme Court ruled that his case could only be heard by a military court since the military had been responsible for his apprehension. Nkunda's defense had sought in vain to have his detention declared illegal, and he has yet to be charged with a crime.

=== Involvement with M23 ===
As of 2014, the UN reports he still remains influential for the CNDP and remains under house arrest in Rwanda. As of a 2025 UN Report, it is speculated Nkunda may currently be working to draw additional support for M23, a Rwanda-backed militia group, due to his popularity.

== Personal life ==
Nkunda has six children. He is a polyglot who speaks English, French, Swahili, Kinyarwanda, Lingala and Kinande, and has claimed to admire leaders including Gandhi and George W. Bush. Nkunda claims to be a Seventh-day Adventist minister, and is a Pentecostal Christian. He claims most of his rebel troops have also converted. In the 2008 documentary Blood Coltan, Nkunda proudly shows a button he wears that reads "Rebels for Christ." He also claims to receive help and guidance from American "Rebels for Christ" who visit the Congo spreading Pentecostal Christianity. The Seventh-day Adventist Church has denied Nkunda's claims of being a pastor and member of the church.
