= Jean-Marie Runiga =

Congolese evangelical bishop and rebel

Jean-Marie Runiga Lugerero is a Congolese evangelical bishop and the former rebel leader. He served as President of the March 23 Movement (M23), a rebel group in the Democratic Republic of the Congo, from 2012 to 2013. He previously rejected a deadline by a regional summit in Uganda for the M23 movement to withdraw from Goma saying "withdrawal from Goma should not be a prerequisite for talks but rather should come as the result of talks". M23 withdrew from Goma in December following negotiations. He was sacked from the movement after he signed an accord on February 24 pledging to end the conflict. In a statement signed by M23's military leader, Sultani Makenga, he was accused of treason because of "financial embezzlement, divisions, ethnic hatred, deceit and political immaturity". A faction of the M23 loyal to him, including M23 founder Bosco Ntaganda, has clashed with those loyal to Sultani Makenga.
