= Rutshuru =

Town in North Kivu in the DRC

- Rutshuru
- Location within Democratic Republic of the Congo
- Coordinates: 01°11′9″S 29°26′58″E
- Country: DR Congo
- Province: North Kivu
- Territory: Rutshuru
- Time zone: UTC+2 (CAT)
- National language: Swahili
- Climate: Aw

Rutshuru is a town located in the North Kivu province of the eastern Democratic Republic of the Congo, and is headquarters of an administrative district, the Rutshuru Territory. The town lies in the western branch of the Albertine Rift between Lakes Edward and Kivu. The Ugandan border is 15 km (9.3 mi) east and the Rwandan border is 30 km (19 mi) south-east.

Lava flows from the Nyamuragira volcano, 40 km (25 mi) south-west, have come within 7 km (4.3 mi) of the town in recent years. The town has over 800,000 inhabitants from many tribal backgrounds Nande, hunde and Pygmee.

It was the largest town controlled by the former National Congress for the Defence of the People rebel group. By November 2012, the town had become a stronghold of the March 23 Movement in their conflict with the Congolese government. After the defeat of the M23 rebellion the town was retaken by the Congolese army, and President Joseph Kabila paid a visit to the town in November 2013 after driving from Kisangani.

As part of M23's resurgence the group recaptured Rutshuru in October 2022.

== Rwandan Genocide and Congo Wars ==
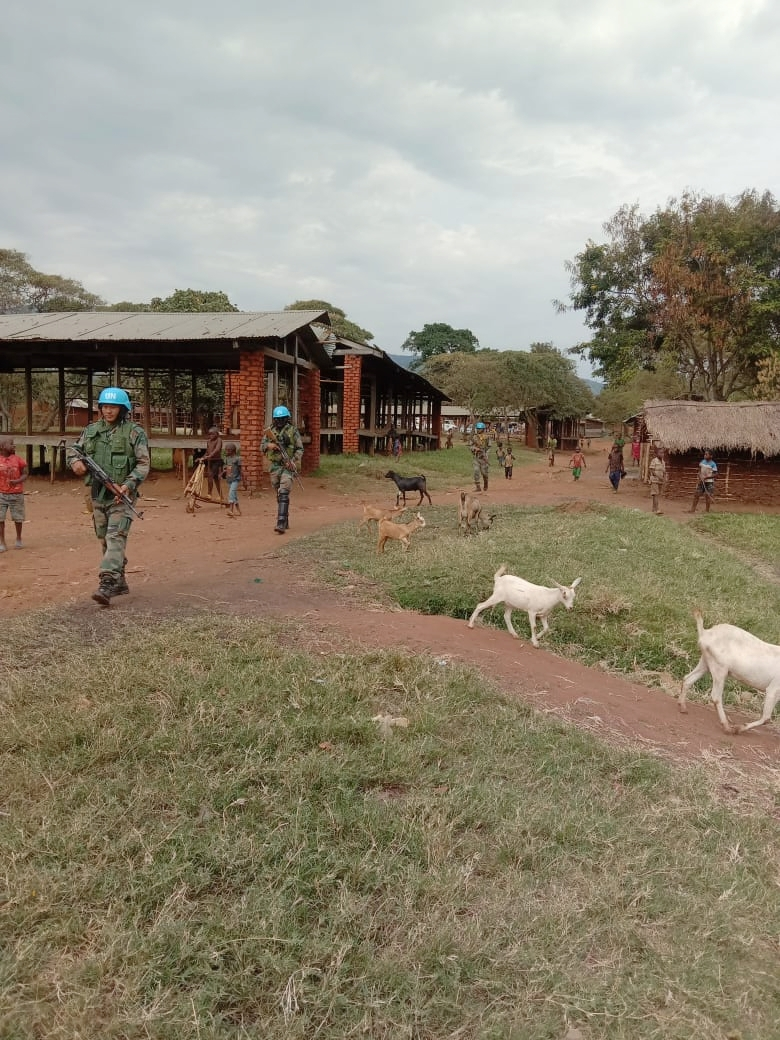
MONUSCO patrol of the town in 2022

Rutshuru has a Rwandan population largely from the Rwandan Revolution in 1959 and the Rwandan genocide where large numbers of Rwandan Hutu refugees were housed in camps there. The First and Second Congo Wars saw substantial fighting in the district involving Ugandan, Rwandan and Congolese forces of various factions. Since the official end of the war in 2002/3, fighting has periodically erupted between militias allied to the Hutu and Tutsi. The town has been occupied by proxy forces linked to Rwandan president Paul Kagame and—since the start of the Rwandan genocide—has been the focal point of troubles between Tutsi and Hutu with stakes in Rwanda. Rutshuru, like most of the DR Congo eastern region, is a town of collateral damage from infighting between Rwandan proxies and the government forces.

== Mining ==
The Lueshe mine is located in the Territoire de Rutshuru, north of Rutshuru town, exploiting one of the world's biggest reserves of pyrochlore, an ore of niobium. It is said to be the most valuable mineral resource of the eastern Congo but the mine has been officially closed for some years due to disputes over ownership of mining rights, the instability of the region, and the need to rehabilitate the mining equipment. Smuggling of pyrochlore by rebels under Laurent Nkunda is said to take place across the border into Rwanda. There are approximately 15 gold mining sites in and around Rutshuru.

== Features and attractions ==
- Rutshuru Falls
- May-Ya-Moto volcano and hot springs, 32 km north-north-west
- Virunga National Park
- Lake Kirwa, a small crater lake 10 km south-west
