= Incheh =

Incheh (Persian: اينچه) may refer to various places in Iran:

- Incheh, Meshgin Shahr, Ardabil Province
- Incheh, Nir, Ardabil Province
- Incheh-ye Olya (disambiguation)
- Incheh-ye Sofla (disambiguation)
- Incheh Rahbari
- Incheh-ye Khoda Bandehlu
- Incheh, Shahin Dezh, West Azerbaijan Province
- Incheh, Keshavarz, Shahin Dezh County, West Azerbaijan Province
- Incheh-ye Hajj Mohammad, West Azerbaijan province
- Incheh-ye Nurollah, West Azerbaijan Province
- Incheh-ye Said Nezam
