= Qezel Bolagh =

Qezel Bolagh (Persian: قزل بلاغ), also rendered as Ghezel Bolagh, may refer to:

- Qezel Bolagh, Hashtrud, East Azerbaijan Province
- Qezel Bolagh, Meyaneh, East Azerbaijan Province
- Qezel Bolagh, Bijar, Kurdistan Province
- Qezel Bolagh, Divandarreh, Kurdistan Province
- Qezel Bolagh, West Azerbaijan
- Qezel Bolagh, Zanjan
