= Keshtaz =

Keshtaz كشتاز
- Village
- Location within Iran
- Coordinates: 39°20′24″N 44°16′30″E
- Country: Iran
- Province: West Azerbaijan
- County: Chaldoran
- Bakhsh: Dashtaki
- Rural District: Avajiq-e Shomali

Population (2006)
  - Total: 28
- Time zone: UTC+3:30 (IRST)
  - Summer (DST): UTC+4:30 (IRDT)

Keshtaz (Persian: كشتاز, also Romanized as Keshtāz; also known as Keshtār) is a village in Avajiq-e Shomali Rural District, Dashtaki District, Chaldoran County, West Azerbaijan Province, Iran. At the 2006 census, its population was 28, in 7 families.
