= Asadollah Kandi =

Asadollah Kandi اسداله كندي
- Village
- Location within Iran
- Coordinates: 39°01′33″N 44°27′25″E
- Country: Iran
- Province: West Azerbaijan
- County: Chaldoran
- Bakhsh: Central
- Rural District: Chaldoran-e Shomali

Population (2006)
  - Total: 39
- Time zone: UTC+3:30 (IRST)
  - Summer (DST): UTC+4:30 (IRDT)

Asadollah Kandi (Persian: اسداله كندي, also Romanized as Asadollāh Kandī; also known as ʿAntar Kandī-ye ‘Olyā) is a village in Chaldoran-e Shomali Rural District, in the Central District of Chaldoran County, West Azerbaijan Province, Iran. At the 2006 census, its population was 39, in 9 families.
