= Anbar, Iran =

Anbar (Persian: انبار or عنبر) in Iran, may refer to:

- Anbar, Khuzestan (عنبر - ʿAnbar)
- Anbar, West Azerbaijan (انبار - Anbār)
- Anbar-e Maran, West Azerbaijan Province
- Anbar-e Olya, West Azerbaijan Province
- Anbar-e Olya, Bukan, West Azerbaijan Province
- Anbar-e Sofla, West Azerbaijan Province
