= Malhamlu-ye Sofla =

Malhamlu-ye Sofla ملحملوسفلي
- Village
- Location within Iran
- Coordinates: 38°53′06″N 44°26′06″E
- Country: Iran
- Province: West Azerbaijan
- County: Chaldoran
- Bakhsh: Central
- Rural District: Chaldoran-e Jonubi

Population (2006)
  - Total: 132
- Time zone: UTC+3:30 (IRST)
  - Summer (DST): UTC+4:30 (IRDT)

Malhamlu-ye Sofla (Persian: ملحملوسفلي, also Romanized as Malḩamlū-ye Soflá; also known as Malḩamlū-ye Pā'īn) is a village in Chaldoran-e Jonubi Rural District, in the Central District of Chaldoran County, West Azerbaijan Province, Iran. At the 2006 census, its population was 132, in 20 families.
