= Antar Kandi =

Antar Kandi عنتركندي
- Village
- Location within Iran
- Coordinates: 39°01′42″N 44°28′16″E
- Country: Iran
- Province: West Azerbaijan
- County: Chaldoran
- Bakhsh: Central
- Rural District: Chaldoran-e Shomali

Population (2006)
  - Total: 65
- Time zone: UTC+3:30 (IRST)
  - Summer (DST): UTC+4:30 (IRDT)

Antar Kandi (Persian: عنتركندي, also Romanized as ‘Antar Kandī) is a village in Chaldoran-e Shomali Rural District, in the Central District of Chaldoran County, West Azerbaijan Province, Iran. At the 2006 census, its population was 65, in 15 families.
