= Qarahchi Bolagh =

Qarahchi Bolagh قره چي بلاغ
- Village
- Location within Iran
- Coordinates: 38°56′13″N 44°27′18″E
- Country: Iran
- Province: West Azerbaijan
- County: Chaldoran
- Bakhsh: Central
- Rural District: Chaldoran-e Jonubi

Population (2006)
  - Total: 112
- Time zone: UTC+3:30 (IRST)
  - Summer (DST): UTC+4:30 (IRDT)

Qarahchi Bolagh (Persian: قره چي بلاغ, also Romanized as Qarahchī Bolāgh; also known as Qarahchah Bolāgh) is a village in Chaldoran-e Jonubi Rural District, in the Central District of Chaldoran County, West Azerbaijan Province, Iran. At the 2006 census, its population was 112, in 19 families.
