= Injeh =

Injeh (Persian: اينجه) may refer to:

- Injeh-ye Olya
- Injeh-ye Sofla
- Injeh-ye Sofla, Maku
