= Salmanabad, West Azerbaijan =

Salmanabad سلمان اباد
- Village
- Location within Iran
- Coordinates: 39°20′33″N 44°18′31″E
- Country: Iran
- Province: West Azerbaijan
- County: Chaldoran
- Bakhsh: Dashtaki
- Rural District: Avajiq-e Shomali

Population (2006)
  - Total: 24
- Time zone: UTC+3:30 (IRST)
  - Summer (DST): UTC+4:30 (IRDT)

Salmanabad (Persian: سلمان اباد, also Romanized as Salmānābād; also known as Soleymānābād) is a village in Avajiq-e Shomali Rural District, Dashtaki District, Chaldoran County, West Azerbaijan Province, Iran. At the 2006 census, its population was 24, in 7 families.
