= Karan, Iran =

Karan or Karran or Korran or Keran (Persian: كران), also rendered as Kiran, may refer to:

- Karan-e Bozorg, Khalkhal, Ardabil Province
- Karan-e Bozorg, Nir, Ardabil Province
- Korran, Kerman
- Karan, Chaharmahal and Bakhtiari
- Karan, Razavi Khorasan
- Karan, West Azerbaijan
- Karan-e Olya, West Azerbaijan Province
- Karan-e Sofla, West Azerbaijan Province
- Karan-e Vasat, West Azerbaijan Province
