= Alujenni =

Alujenni علوجني
- Village
- Location within Iran
- Coordinates: 39°19′41″N 44°12′00″E
- Country: Iran
- Province: West Azerbaijan
- County: Chaldoran
- Bakhsh: Dashtaki
- Rural District: Avajiq-e Shomali

Population (2006)
  - Total: 218
- Time zone: UTC+3:30 (IRST)
  - Summer (DST): UTC+4:30 (IRDT)

Alujenni (Persian: علوجني, also Romanized as ‘Alūjennī and ‘Alū Jenī; also known as ‘Alūjīnī) is a village in Avajiq-e Shomali Rural District, Dashtaki District, Chaldoran County, West Azerbaijan Province, Iran. At the 2006 census, its population was 218, in 49 families.
