= Yekmaleh-ye Sofla =

Yekmaleh-ye Sofla يكماله سفلي
- Village
- Location within Iran
- Coordinates: 38°52′34″N 44°18′42″E
- Country: Iran
- Province: West Azerbaijan
- County: Chaldoran
- Bakhsh: Central
- Rural District: Chaldoran-e Jonubi

Population (2006)
  - Total: 37
- Time zone: UTC+3:30 (IRST)
  - Summer (DST): UTC+4:30 (IRDT)

Yekmaleh-ye Sofla (Persian: يكماله سفلي, also romanized as Yekmāleh-ye Soflá; also known as Yekmāleh and Yekmāleh-ye Pā’īn) is a village in Chaldoran-e Jonubi Rural District, in the Central District of Chaldoran County, West Azerbaijan Province, Iran. At the 2006 census, its population was 37, in 9 families.
