= Pir Ahmad Kandi =

Pir Ahmad Kandi پيراحمدكندي
- Village
- Location within Iran
- Coordinates: 39°23′35″N 44°06′14″E
- Country: Iran
- Province: West Azerbaijan
- County: Chaldoran
- Bakhsh: Dashtaki
- Rural District: Avajiq-e Shomali

Population (2006)
  - Total: 200
- Time zone: UTC+3:30 (IRST)
  - Summer (DST): UTC+4:30 (IRDT)

Pir Ahmad Kandi (Persian: پيراحمدكندي, also Romanized as Pīr Aḩmad Kandī) is a village in Avajiq-e Shomali Rural District, Dashtaki District, Chaldoran County, West Azerbaijan Province, Iran. At the 2006 census, its population was 200, in 38 families.
