= Qurniav-e Sofla =

Qurniav-e Sofla قوري ناوسفلي
- Village
- Location within Iran
- Coordinates: 38°58′37″N 44°35′09″E
- Country: Iran
- Province: West Azerbaijan
- County: Chaldoran
- Bakhsh: Central
- Rural District: Baba Jik

Population (2006)
  - Total: 76
- Time zone: UTC+3:30 (IRST)
  - Summer (DST): UTC+4:30 (IRDT)

Qurniav-e Sofla (Persian: قوري ناوسفلي, also Romanized as Qūrnīāv-e Soflá; also known as Qūrīnāv-e Pā'īn) is a village in the Baba Jik Rural District of Chaldoran County, West Azerbaijan Province, Iran. In the 2006 census, its population was 76, in 14 families.
