= Sufali =

Sufali صوفعلي
- Village
- Location within Iran
- Coordinates: 39°20′57″N 44°06′15″E
- Country: Iran
- Province: West Azerbaijan
- County: Chaldoran
- Bakhsh: Dashtaki
- Rural District: Avajiq-e Shomali

Population (2006)
  - Total: 80
- Time zone: UTC+3:30 (IRST)

Sufali (Persian: صوفعلي, also Romanized asŞūf‘alī, Şūfī ‘Alī, and Sowf‘alī; also known as Şūf‘alī Kandī) is a village in Avajiq-e Shomali Rural District, Dashtaki District, Chaldoran County, West Azerbaijan Province, Iran. At the 2006 census, its population was 80, in 17 families.
