= Jabbar Kandi =

Jabbar Kandi جباركندي
- Village
- Location within Iran
- Coordinates: 39°02′07″N 44°29′03″E
- Country: Iran
- Province: West Azerbaijan
- County: Chaldoran
- Bakhsh: Central
- Rural District: Chaldoran-e Shomali

Population (2006)
  - Total: 59
- Time zone: UTC+3:30 (IRST)
  - Summer (DST): UTC+4:30 (IRDT)

Jabbar Kandi (Persian: جباركندي, also Romanized as Jabbār Kandī; also known as ʿAntar Kandī-ye Soflá) is a village in Chaldoran-e Shomali Rural District, in the Central District of Chaldoran County, West Azerbaijan Province, Iran. At the 2006 census, its population was 59, in 13 families.
