= Qusha Bolagh =

Qusha Bolagh or Qowsha Bolagh (Persian: قوشابلاغ) may refer to:

- Qusha Bolagh, East Azerbaijan
- Qusha Bolagh, West Azerbaijan
- Qusha Bolagh-e Olya, West Azerbaijan Province
- Qusha Bolagh-e Sofla, West Azerbaijan Province
