= Qermezdash =

Qermezdash قرمزداش
- Village
- Location within Iran
- Coordinates: 39°14′07″N 44°23′18″E
- Country: Iran
- Province: West Azerbaijan
- County: Chaldoran
- Bakhsh: Central
- Rural District: Chaldoran-e Shomali

Population (2006)
  - Total: 135
- Time zone: UTC+3:30 (IRST)
  - Summer (DST): UTC+4:30 (IRDT)

Qermezdash (Persian: قرمزداش, also Romanized as Qermezdāsh) is a village in Chaldoran-e Shomali Rural District, in the Central District of Chaldoran County, West Azerbaijan Province, Iran. At the 2006 census, its population was 135, in 26 families.
