= Dar Darreh Si =

Dar Darreh Si داردره سي
- Village
- Location within Iran
- Coordinates: 38°59′00″N 44°27′00″E
- Country: Iran
- Province: West Azerbaijan
- County: Chaldoran
- Bakhsh: Central
- Rural District: Chaldoran-e Jonubi

Population (2006)
  - Total: 63
- Time zone: UTC+3:30 (IRST)
  - Summer (DST): UTC+4:30 (IRDT)

Dar Darreh Si (Persian: داردره سي, also Romanized as Dār Darreh Sī) is a village in Chaldoran-e Jonubi Rural District, in the Central District of Chaldoran County, West Azerbaijan Province, Iran. At the 2006 census, its population was 63, in 13 families.
