= Sazaghol =

Sazaghol سازاغل
- Village
- Location within Iran
- Coordinates: 39°12′42″N 44°18′45″E
- Country: Iran
- Province: West Azerbaijan
- County: Chaldoran
- Bakhsh: Dashtaki
- Rural District: Avajiq-e Jonubi

Population (2006)
  - Total: 133
- Time zone: UTC+3:30 (IRST)
  - Summer (DST): UTC+4:30 (IRDT)

Sazaghol (Persian: سازاغل, also Romanized as Sāzāghol; also known as Sāzoghli) is a village in Avajiq-e Jonubi Rural District, Dashtaki District, Chaldoran County, West Azerbaijan Province, Iran. At the 2006 census, its population was 133, in 27 families.
