= Tat Kandi =

Tat Kandi تاتكندي
- Village
- Location within Iran
- Coordinates: 38°59′57″N 44°25′28″E
- Country: Iran
- Province: West Azerbaijan
- County: Chaldoran
- Bakhsh: Central
- Rural District: Chaldoran-e Jonubi

Population (2006)
  - Total: 232
- Time zone: UTC+3:30 (IRST)
  - Summer (DST): UTC+4:30 (IRDT)

Tat Kandi (Persian: تاتكندي, also Romanized as Tāt Kandī) is a village in Chaldoran-e Jonubi Rural District, in the Central District of Chaldoran County, West Azerbaijan Province, Iran. At the 2006 census, its population was 232, in 40 families.
