= Arab Dizaji =

Village in West Azerbaijan province, Iran

Arab Dizaji Persian: عرب ديزجي
- Village
- Location within Iran
- Coordinates: 39°18′50″N 44°09′52″E
- Country: Iran
- Province: West Azerbaijan
- County: Chaldoran
- District: Dashtak
- Rural District: Avajiq-e Shomali

Population (2016)
  - Total: 629
- Time zone: UTC+3:30 (IRST)

Arab Dizaji (Persian: عرب ديزجي) (Note: Also romanized as ‘Arab Dīzajī; also known as ‘Arab Dīzaj, Arāb Dizeh, ‘Arab Dizehsī, ‘Arab-e Dīzaj, and ‘Arab-e Dīzehsī) is a village in Avajiq-e Shomali Rural District (Note: Formerly Avajiq Rural District) of Dashtak District in Chaldoran County, West Azerbaijan province, Iran.

== Demographics ==
=== Population ===
At the time of the 2006 National Census, the village's population was 750 in 140 households, when it was in Avajiq-e Jonubi Rural District. The following census in 2011 counted 678 people in 195 households. The 2016 census measured the population of the village as 629 people in 182 households, by which time it had been transferred to Avajiq-e Shomali Rural District. It was the most populous village in its rural district.
