= Sadr ol Din =

Sadr ol Din صدرالدين
- Village
- Location within Iran
- Coordinates: 39°07′11″N 44°22′39″E
- Country: Iran
- Province: West Azerbaijan
- County: Chaldoran
- Bakhsh: Central
- Rural District: Chaldoran-e Shomali

Population (2006)
  - Total: 69
- Time zone: UTC+3:30 (IRST)
  - Summer (DST): UTC+4:30 (IRDT)

Sadr ol Din (Persian: صدرالدين, also Romanized as Şadr ol Dīn and Şadr od Dīn) is a village in Chaldoran-e Shomali Rural District, in the Central District of Chaldoran County, West Azerbaijan Province, Iran. At the 2006 census, its population was 69, in 14 families.
