= Qadu Kandi =

Qadu Kandi قادوكندي
- Village
- Location within Iran
- Coordinates: 39°03′48″N 44°30′14″E
- Country: Iran
- Province: West Azerbaijan
- County: Chaldoran
- Bakhsh: Central
- Rural District: Chaldoran-e Shomali

Population (2006)
  - Total: 211
- Time zone: UTC+3:30 (IRST)
  - Summer (DST): UTC+4:30 (IRDT)

Qadu Kandi (Persian: قادوكندي, also Romanized as Qādū Kandī) is a village in Chaldoran-e Shomali Rural District, in the Central District of Chaldoran County, West Azerbaijan Province, Iran. At the 2006 census, its population was 211, in 40 families.
