= Dushan Tappeh =

Dushan Tappeh دوشان تپه
- Village
- Location within Iran
- Coordinates: 38°58′09″N 44°15′44″E
- Country: Iran
- Province: West Azerbaijan
- County: Chaldoran
- Bakhsh: Central
- Rural District: Chaldoran-e Jonubi

Population (2006)
  - Total: 59
- Time zone: UTC+3:30 (IRST)
  - Summer (DST): UTC+4:30 (IRDT)

Dushan Tappeh (Persian: دوشان تپه, also Romanized as Dūshān Tappeh and Dūshān Tapah) is a village in Chaldoran-e Jonubi Rural District, in the Central District of Chaldoran County, West Azerbaijan Province, Iran. At the 2006 census, its population was 59, in 13 families.
