= Qezkhachlu =

Qezkhachlu قزخاچلو
- Village
- Location within Iran
- Coordinates: 39°01′17″N 44°36′57″E
- Country: Iran
- Province: West Azerbaijan
- County: Chaldoran
- Bakhsh: Central
- Rural District: Baba Jik

Population (2006)
  - Total: 101
- Time zone: UTC+3:30 (IRST)
  - Summer (DST): UTC+4:30 (IRDT)

Qezkhachlu (Persian: قزخاچلو, also Romanized as Qezkhāchlū; also known as Ghiz Khachloo, Kizkish, Kizkishli, Qīzkhāchlū, Qīz Khājlū, Qīz Khāshlū, and Qīzqashlī) is a village in Baba Jik Rural District, in the Central District of Chaldoran County, West Azerbaijan Province, Iran. At the 2006 census, its population was 101, in 21 families.
