= Abarabashi =

Abarabashi اباراباشي
- Village
- Location within Iran
- Coordinates: 39°07′45″N 44°31′48″E
- Country: Iran
- Province: West Azerbaijan
- County: Chaldoran
- Bakhsh: Central
- Rural District: Chaldoran-e Shomali

Population (2006)
  - Total: 85
- Time zone: UTC+3:30 (IRST)
  - Summer (DST): UTC+4:30 (IRDT)

Abarabashi (Persian: اباراباشي, also Romanized as Ābārābāshī) is a village in Chaldoran-e Shomali Rural District, in the Central District of Chaldoran County, West Azerbaijan Province, Iran. In the 2006 census, its population was 85, in 16 families.
