= Qahreman Kandi =

Qahreman Kandi قهرمان كندي
- Village
- Location within Iran
- Coordinates: 39°15′03″N 44°15′46″E
- Country: Iran
- Province: West Azerbaijan
- County: Chaldoran
- Bakhsh: Dashtaki
- Rural District: Avajiq-e Jonubi

Population (2006)
  - Total: 184
- Time zone: UTC+3:30 (IRST)
  - Summer (DST): UTC+4:30 (IRDT)

Qahreman Kandi (Persian: قهرمان كندي, also Romanized as Qahremān Kandī; also known as Shāh Bandehlū) is a village in Avajiq-e Jonubi Rural District, Dashtaki District, Chaldoran County, West Azerbaijan Province, Iran. At the 2006 census, its population was 184, in 37 families.
