= Reyhanluy =

Reyhanluy (Persian: ريحانلوي), also rendered as Reyhanlu may refer to:

- Reyhanluy-e Olya
- Reyhanluy-e Sofla
- Reyhanluy-e Vosta
