= Jang Tappeh =

Jang Tappeh جنگ تپه
- Village
- Location within Iran
- Coordinates: 39°16′47″N 44°11′51″E
- Country: Iran
- Province: West Azerbaijan
- County: Chaldoran
- Bakhsh: Dashtaki
- Rural District: Avajiq-e Jonubi

Population (2006)
  - Total: 166
- Time zone: UTC+3:30 (IRST)
  - Summer (DST): UTC+4:30 (IRDT)

Jang Tappeh (Persian: جنگ تپه, also Romanized as Jang Tapeh) is a village in Avajiq-e Jonubi Rural District, Dashtaki District, Chaldoran County, West Azerbaijan Province, Iran. At the 2006 census, its population was 166, in 36 families.
