= Bozghaleh =

Bozghaleh بزغاله
- Village
- Location within Iran
- Coordinates: 39°06′43″N 44°18′09″E
- Country: Iran
- Province: West Azerbaijan
- County: Chaldoran
- Bakhsh: Central
- Rural District: Chaldoran-e Shomali

Population (2006)
  - Total: 116
- Time zone: UTC+3:30 (IRST)
  - Summer (DST): UTC+4:30 (IRDT)

Bozghaleh (Persian: بزغاله, also Romanized as Bozghāleh; also known as Boz Qal‘eh) is a village in Chaldoran-e Shomali Rural District, in the Central District of Chaldoran County, West Azerbaijan Province, Iran. At the 2006 census, its population was 116, in 22 families.
