= Tahmaseb Kandi =

Tahmaseb Kandi طهماسب كندي
- Village
- Location within Iran
- Coordinates: 39°18′28″N 44°08′13″E
- Country: Iran
- Province: West Azerbaijan
- County: Chaldoran
- Bakhsh: Dashtaki
- Rural District: Avajiq-e Jonubi

Population (2006)
  - Total: 98
- Time zone: UTC+3:30 (IRST)
  - Summer (DST): UTC+4:30 (IRDT)

Tahmaseb Kandi (Persian: طهماسب كندي, also Romanized as Ţahmāseb Kandī) is a village in Avajiq-e Jonubi Rural District, Dashtaki District, Chaldoran County, West Azerbaijan Province, Iran. At the 2006 census, its population was 98, in 15 families.
