= Soleyman Aghol =

Soleyman Aghol سليمان عاقل
- Village
- Location within Iran
- Coordinates: 39°22′51″N 44°03′14″E
- Country: Iran
- Province: West Azerbaijan
- County: Chaldoran
- Bakhsh: Dashtaki
- Rural District: Avajiq-e Shomali

Population (2006)
  - Total: 78
- Time zone: UTC+3:30 (IRST)

Soleyman Aghol (Persian: سليمان عاقل, also Romanized as Soleymān Āghol) is a border village in Avajiq-e Shomali Rural District, Dashtaki District, Chaldoran County, West Azerbaijan Province, Iran. At the 2006 census, its population was 78, in 17 families. This village is the westernmost habitat area in Iran.
