= Sadal =

Village in West Azerbaijan province, Iran

Sadal Persian: سدل
- Village
- Location within Iran
- Coordinates: 39°05′43″N 44°19′46″E
- Country: Iran
- Province: West Azerbaijan
- County: Chaldoran
- District: Central
- Rural District: Chaldoran-e Shomali

Population (2016)
  - Total: 1,092
- Time zone: UTC+3:30 (IRST)

Sadal (Persian: سدل) (Note: Also romanized as Sa‘dal) is a village in Chaldoran-e Shomali Rural District of the Central District in Chaldoran County, West Azerbaijan province, Iran.

== Demographics ==
=== Population ===
At the time of the 2006 National Census, the village's population was 949 in 208 households. The following census in 2011 counted 1,140 people in 313 households. The 2016 census measured the population of the village as 1,092 people in 322 households. It was the most populous village in its rural district.
