= Segrik =

Village in West Azerbaijan province, Iran

Segrik Persian: سگريك
- Village
- Location within Iran
- Coordinates: 39°04′25″N 44°15′01″E
- Country: Iran
- Province: West Azerbaijan
- County: Chaldoran
- District: Central
- Rural District: Chaldoran-e Jonubi

Population (2016)
  - Total: 658
- Time zone: UTC+3:30 (IRST)

Segrik (Persian: سگريك) (Note: Also romanized as Segrīk) is a village in Chaldoran-e Jonubi Rural District of the Central District in Chaldoran County, West Azerbaijan province, Iran.

== Demographics ==
=== Population ===
At the time of the 2006 National Census, the village's population was 433 in 80 households. The following census in 2011 counted 490 people in 102 households. The 2016 census measured the population of the village as 658 people in 149 households.
