= Gol Sefid, Chaldoran =

Village in West Azerbaijan province, Iran

Gol Sefid Persian: گل سفيد
- Village
- Location within Iran
- Coordinates: 39°12′56″N 44°19′56″E
- Country: Iran
- Province: West Azerbaijan
- County: Chaldoran
- District: Dashtak
- Rural District: Avajiq-e Jonubi

Population (2016)
  - Total: 244
- Time zone: UTC+3:30 (IRST)

Gol Sefid (Persian: گل سفيد) (Note: Also known as Gol Sa‘īd and Gol Seyyed (گل سيد)) is a village in Avajiq-e Jonubi Rural District of Dashtak District in Chaldoran County, West Azerbaijan province, Iran.

== Demographics ==
=== Population ===
At the time of the 2006 National Census, the village's population (as Gol Seyyed) was 220 in 37 households. The following census in 2011 counted 207 people in 42 households, by which time the name of the village had been changed to Gol Sefid. The 2016 census measured the population of the village as 218 people in 47 households.
