= Kord Kandi, Chaldoran =

Village in West Azerbaijan province, Iran

Kord Kandi Persian: كردكندي
- Village
- Location within Iran
- Coordinates: 38°54′56″N 44°27′24″E
- Country: Iran
- Province: West Azerbaijan
- County: Chaldoran
- District: Central
- Rural District: Chaldoran-e Jonubi

Population (2016)
  - Total: 507
- Time zone: UTC+3:30 (IRST)

Kord Kandi (Persian: كردكندي) (Note: Also romanized as Kord Kandī) is a village in Chaldoran-e Jonubi Rural District of the Central District in Chaldoran County, West Azerbaijan province, Iran.

== Demographics ==
=== Population ===
At the time of the 2006 National Census, the village's population was 510 in 91 households. The following census in 2011 counted 531 people in 122 households. The 2016 census measured the population of the village as 507 people in 122 households.
