= Shadluy-e Olya =

Shadluy-e Olya شادلوي عليا
- Village
- Location within Iran
- Coordinates: 39°16′31″N 44°16′30″E
- Country: Iran
- Province: West Azerbaijan
- County: Chaldoran
- Bakhsh: Dashtaki
- Rural District: Avajiq-e Jonubi

Population (2006)
  - Total: 204
- Time zone: UTC+3:30 (IRST)
  - Summer (DST): UTC+4:30 (IRDT)

Shadluy-e Olya (Persian: شادلوي عليا, also Romanized as Shādlūy-e ‘Olyā; also known as Qorban Kandī and Shādlū-ye ‘Olyā) is a village in Avajiq-e Jonubi Rural District, Dashtaki District, Chaldoran County, West Azerbaijan Province, Iran. At the 2006 census, its population was 204, in 40 families.
