= Khan Amir, West Azerbaijan =

Khan Amir خان امير
- Village
- Location within Iran
- Coordinates: 39°09′54″N 44°24′01″E
- Country: Iran
- Province: West Azerbaijan
- County: Chaldoran
- Bakhsh: Central
- Rural District: Chaldoran-e Shomali

Population (2006)
  - Total: 44
- Time zone: UTC+3:30 (IRST)
  - Summer (DST): UTC+4:30 (IRDT)

Khan Amir (Persian: خان امير, also Romanized as Khān Amīr) is a village in Chaldoran-e Shomali Rural District, in the Central District of Chaldoran County, West Azerbaijan Province, Iran. At the 2006 census, its population was 44, in 12 families.
