= Aghbolagh-e Kalisa Kandi =

Village in West Azerbaijan province, Iran

Aghbolagh-e Kalisa Kandi Persian: اغبلاغ كليسا كندي
- Village
- Location within Iran
- Coordinates: 39°20′07″N 44°11′18″E
- Country: Iran
- Province: West Azerbaijan
- County: Chaldoran
- District: Dashtak
- Rural District: Avajiq-e Shomali

Population (2016)
  - Total: 58
- Time zone: UTC+3:30 (IRST)

Aghbolagh-e Kalisa Kandi (Persian: اغبلاغ كليسا كندي) (Note: Also romanized as Āghbolāgh-e Kalīsā Kandī; also known as Āghbolāgh and Āqbolāgh) is a village in Avajiq-e Shomali Rural District (Note: Formerly Avajiq Rural District) of Dashtak District in Chaldoran County, West Azerbaijan province, Iran.

== Demographics ==
=== Population ===
At the time of the 2006 National Census, the village's population was 80 in 20 households. The following census in 2011 counted 68 people in 23 households. The 2016 census measured the population of the village as 58 people in 21 households.
