= Karan-e Olya =

Karan-e Olya كران عليا
- Village
- Location within Iran
- Coordinates: 38°57′24″N 44°42′17″E
- Country: Iran
- Province: West Azerbaijan
- County: Chaldoran
- Bakhsh: Central
- Rural District: Baba Jik

Population (2006)
  - Total: 88
- Time zone: UTC+3:30 (IRST)
  - Summer (DST): UTC+4:30 (IRDT)

Karan-e Olya (Persian: كران عليا, also Romanized as Karān-e ‘Olyā, Karan Olya, and Kerān-e ‘Olyā; also known as Karān-e Bālā, Karrān-e Bālā, Kerān Bālā, Kerān-e Bālā, Kīrān-e Bālā, and Yukāri Karan) is a village in Baba Jik Rural District, in the Central District of Chaldoran County, West Azerbaijan Province, Iran. At the 2006 census, its population was 88, in 23 families.
