= Mirabad, Chaldoran =

Village in West Azerbaijan province, Iran

Mirabad Persian: ميراباد
- Village
- Location within Iran
- Coordinates: 38°59′55″N 44°42′36″E
- Country: Iran
- Province: West Azerbaijan
- County: Chaldoran
- District: Central
- Rural District: Baba Jik

Population (2016)
  - Total: 270
- Time zone: UTC+3:30 (IRST)

Mirabad (Persian: ميراباد) (Note: Also romanized as Mīrābād; also known as Mīrābād-e Yūshānlī) is a village in Baba Jik Rural District of the Central District in Chaldoran County, West Azerbaijan province, Iran.

== Demographics ==
=== Population ===
At the time of the 2006 National Census, the village's population was 354 in 65 households. The following census in 2011 counted 255 people in 74 households. The 2016 census measured the population of the village as 270 people in 78 households.
