= Emamqoli Kandi =

Emamqoli Kandi (Persian: امامقلي كندي) may refer to:

- Emamqoli Kandi-ye Olya
- Emamqoli Kandi-ye Sofla
