= Incheh Salah-e Sofla =

Incheh Salah-e Sofla اينچه صلاح سفلي
- Village
- Country: Iran
- Province: West Azerbaijan
- County: Chaldoran
- Bakhsh: Central
- Rural District: Chaldoran-e Jonubi

Population (2006)
  - Total: 167
- Time zone: UTC+3:30 (IRST)
  - Summer (DST): UTC+4:30 (IRDT)

Incheh Salah-e Sofla (Persian: اينچه صلاح سفلي, also Romanized as Īncheh Şalāḩ-e Soflá) is a village in Chaldoran-e Jonubi Rural District, in the Central District of Chaldoran County, West Azerbaijan Province, Iran. At the 2006 census, its population was 167, in 23 families.
