= Sari Ojaq =

Village in West Azerbaijan province, Iran

Sari Ojaq Persian: ساري اجاق
- Village
- Location within Iran
- Coordinates: 39°22′50″N 44°15′41″E
- Country: Iran
- Province: West Azerbaijan
- County: Chaldoran
- District: Dashtak
- Rural District: Avajiq-e Shomali

Population (2016)
  - Total: 399
- Time zone: UTC+3:30 (IRST)

Sari Ojaq (Persian: ساري اجاق) (Note: Also romanized as Sārī Ojāq; also known as Sheykh ʿAskar (شيخ عسكر)) is a village in Avajiq-e Shomali Rural District (Note: Formerly Avajiq Rural District) of Dashtak District in Chaldoran County, West Azerbaijan province, Iran.

== Demographics ==
=== Population ===
At the time of the 2006 National Census, the village's population was 418 in 83 households. The following census in 2011 counted 423 people in 110 households. The 2016 census measured the population of the village as 399 people in 94 households.
