= Reyhanluy-e Sofla =

Reyhanluy-e Sofla ريحانلوي سفلي
- Village
- Location within Iran
- Coordinates: 39°06′51″N 44°28′53″E
- Country: Iran
- Province: West Azerbaijan
- County: Chaldoran
- Bakhsh: Central
- Rural District: Chaldoran-e Shomali

Population (2006)
  - Total: 15
- Time zone: UTC+3:30 (IRST)
  - Summer (DST): UTC+4:30 (IRDT)

Reyhanluy-e Sofla (Persian: ريحانلوي سفلي, also Romanized as Reyḩānlūy-e Soflá; also known as Reyḩānlū-ye Soflá) is a village in Chaldoran-e Shomali Rural District, in the Central District of Chaldoran County, West Azerbaijan Province, Iran. At the 2006 census, its population was 15, in four families.
