= Karan-e Vasat =

Karan-e Vasat كران وسط
- Village
- Location within Iran
- Coordinates: 38°57′35″N 44°43′56″E
- Country: Iran
- Province: West Azerbaijan
- County: Chaldoran
- Bakhsh: Central
- Rural District: Baba Jik

Population (2006)
  - Total: 57
- Time zone: UTC+3:30 (IRST)
  - Summer (DST): UTC+4:30 (IRDT)

Karan-e Vasat (Persian: كران وسط, also Romanized as Karān-e Vasaṭ; also known as Shahrābād, Karān-e Mīānī and Kerān-e Mīānī) is a village in Baba Jik Rural District, in the Central District of Chaldoran County, West Azerbaijan Province, Iran. At the 2006 census, its population was 57, in 11 families.
