= Baghlachi-ye Olya =

Baghlachi-ye Olya بغلچي عليا
- Village
- Location within Iran
- Coordinates: 38°50′34″N 44°20′21″E
- Country: Iran
- Province: West Azerbaijan
- County: Chaldoran
- Bakhsh: Central
- Rural District: Chaldoran-e Jonubi

Population (2006)
  - Total: 226
- Time zone: UTC+3:30 (IRST)
  - Summer (DST): UTC+4:30 (IRDT)

Baghlachi-ye Olya (Persian: بغلچي عليا, also Romanized as Baghlachī-ye ‘Olyā; also known as Baghlachī-ye Bālā) is a village in Chaldoran-e Jonubi Rural District, in the Central District of Chaldoran County, West Azerbaijan Province, Iran. At the 2006 census, its population was 226, in 45 families.
