= Qezel Suri =

Village in West Azerbaijan province, Iran

Qezel Suri Persian: قزلسوري
- Village
- Location within Iran
- Coordinates: 39°15′27″N 44°19′48″E
- Country: Iran
- Province: West Azerbaijan
- County: Chaldoran
- District: Dashtak
- Rural District: Avajiq-e Jonubi

Population (2016)
  - Total: 215
- Time zone: UTC+3:30 (IRST)

Qezel Suri (Persian: قزلسوري) (Note: Also romanized as Qezel Sūrī) is a village in Avajiq-e Jonubi Rural District of Dashtak District in Chaldoran County, West Azerbaijan province, Iran.

== Demographics ==
=== Population ===
At the time of the 2006 National Census, the village's population was 263 in 57 households. The following census in 2011 counted 202 people in 48 households. The 2016 census measured the population of the village as 215 people in 58 households.
