= Zaviyeh-ye Sofla =

Village in West Azerbaijan province, Iran

Zaviyeh-ye Sofla Persian: زاويه سفلي
- Village
- Location within Iran
- Coordinates: 39°07′36″N 44°20′41″E
- Country: Iran
- Province: West Azerbaijan
- County: Chaldoran
- District: Central
- Rural District: Chaldoran-e Shomali

Population (2016)
  - Total: 407
- Time zone: UTC+3:30 (IRST)

Zaviyeh-ye Sofla (Persian: زاويه سفلي) (Note: Also romanized as Zaviyeh Sofla and Zāvīyeh-ye Soflá; also known as Zāveyeh, Zāvīeh, Zāvīyeh, and Zāvīyeh-ye Pā’īn) is a village in, and the capital of, Chaldoran-e Shomali Rural District in the Central District of Chaldoran County, West Azerbaijan province, Iran.

== Demographics ==
=== Population ===
At the time of the 2006 National Census, the village's population was 401 in 99 households. The following census in 2011 counted 432 people in 127 households. The 2016 census measured the population of the village as 407 people in 120 households.
