= Sarem Saqlu, West Azerbaijan =

Sarem Saqlu سارمساقلو
- Village
- Location within Iran
- Coordinates: 39°21′00″N 44°18′09″E
- Country: Iran
- Province: West Azerbaijan
- County: Chaldoran
- Bakhsh: Dashtaki
- Rural District: Avajiq-e Shomali

Population (2006)
  - Total: 85
- Time zone: UTC+3:30 (IRST)
  - Summer (DST): UTC+4:30 (IRDT)

Sarem Saqlu (Persian: سارمساقلو, also Romanized as Sārem Sāqlū; also known as Qahremān Kandī and Sārem Sākhlū) is a village in Avajiq-e Shomali Rural District, Dashtaki District, Chaldoran County, West Azerbaijan Province, Iran. At the 2006 census, its population was 85, in 18 families.
