= Qusha Bolagh-e Sofla =

Qusha Bolagh-e Sofla قوشابلاغ سفلي
- Village
- Location within Iran
- Coordinates: 39°00′22″N 44°46′18″E
- Country: Iran
- Province: West Azerbaijan
- County: Chaldoran
- Bakhsh: Central
- Rural District: Baba Jik

Population (2006)
  - Total: 185
- Time zone: UTC+3:30 (IRST)
  - Summer (DST): UTC+4:30 (IRDT)

Qusha Bolagh-e Sofla (Persian: قوشابلاغ سفلي, also Romanized as Qūshā Bolāgh-e Soflá and Qowshā Bolāgh-e Soflá; also known as Qūshā Bolāgh-e Pā’īn) is a village in Baba Jik Rural District, in the Central District of Chaldoran County, West Azerbaijan Province, Iran. At the 2006 census, its population was 185, in 32 families.
