= Qarahjah Veran =

Qarahjah Veran (Persian: قره جه وران), also rendered as Qarahchah Veran or Qarehchah Veran or Qarah Chahveran, may refer to:

- Qarahjah Veran-e Olya
- Qarahjah Veran-e Sofla
