= Isa Golik =

Village in West Azerbaijan province, Iran

Isa Golik Persian: عيسي گليك
- Village
- Location within Iran
- Coordinates: 39°03′47″N 44°16′19″E
- Country: Iran
- Province: West Azerbaijan
- County: Chaldoran
- District: Central
- Rural District: Chaldoran-e Jonubi

Population (2016)
  - Total: 759
- Time zone: UTC+3:30 (IRST)

Isa Golik (Persian: عيسي گليك) (Note: Also romanized as ‘Īsá Golīk; also known as ‘Īsá Gūlī) is a village in Chaldoran-e Jonubi Rural District of the Central District in Chaldoran County, West Azerbaijan province, Iran.

== Demographics ==
=== Population ===
At the time of the 2006 National Census, the village's population was 667 in 119 households. The following census in 2011 counted 782 people in 168 households. The 2016 census measured the population of the village as 759 people in 173 households.
