= Halhal-e Sofla =

Halhal-e Sofla حال حال سفلي
- Village
- Location within Iran
- Coordinates: 39°18′23″N 44°12′06″E
- Country: Iran
- Province: West Azerbaijan
- County: Chaldoran
- Bakhsh: Dashtaki
- Rural District: Avajiq-e Jonubi

Population (2006)
  - Total: 203
- Time zone: UTC+3:30 (IRST)
  - Summer (DST): UTC+4:30 (IRDT)

Halhal-e Sofla (Persian: حال حال سفلي, also Romanized as Ḩālḩāl-e Soflá) is a village in Avajiq-e Jonubi Rural District, Dashtaki District, Chaldoran County, West Azerbaijan Province, Iran. At the 2006 census, its population was 203, in 34 families.
