= Incheh Salah =

Incheh Salah (Persian: اينچه صلاح) may refer to:

- Incheh Salah-e Olya
- Incheh Salah-e Sofla
