= Reyhanluy-e Olya =

Reyhanluy-e Olya ريحانلوي عليا
- Village
- Location within Iran
- Coordinates: 39°05′46″N 44°28′02″E
- Country: Iran
- Province: West Azerbaijan
- County: Chaldoran
- Bakhsh: Central
- Rural District: Chaldoran-e Shomali

Population (2006)
  - Total: 215
- Time zone: UTC+3:30 (IRST)
  - Summer (DST): UTC+4:30 (IRDT)

Reyhanluy-e Olya (Persian: ريحانلوي عليا, also Romanized as Reyḩānlūy-e ‘Olyā; also known as Reyḩanlū-ye ‘Olyā and Reyḩānlū-ye ‘Olyā) is a village in Chaldoran-e Shomali Rural District, in the Central District of Chaldoran County, West Azerbaijan Province, Iran. At the 2006 census, its population was 215, in 42 families.
