= Mohammad Aqa-ye Olya =

Mohammad Aqa-ye Olya محمداقاعليا
- Village
- Location within Iran
- Coordinates: 39°06′28″N 44°35′38″E
- Country: Iran
- Province: West Azerbaijan
- County: Chaldoran
- Bakhsh: Central
- Rural District: Baba Jik

Population (2006)
  - Total: 27
- Time zone: UTC+3:30 (IRST)
  - Summer (DST): UTC+4:30 (IRDT)

Mohammad Aqa-ye Olya (Persian: محمداقاعليا, also Romanized as Moḩammad Āqā-ye ‘Olyā; also known as Moḩammadābād) is a village in Baba Jik Rural District, in the Central District of Chaldoran County, West Azerbaijan Province, Iran. At the 2006 census, its population was 27, in 5 families.
