= Chokhur Kand =

Village in West Azerbaijan province, Iran

Chokhur Kand Persian: چخوركند
- Village
- Location within Iran
- Coordinates: 39°05′55″N 44°16′02″E
- Country: Iran
- Province: West Azerbaijan
- County: Chaldoran
- District: Central
- Rural District: Chaldoran-e Shomali

Population (2016)
  - Total: 432
- Time zone: UTC+3:30 (IRST)

Chokhur Kand (Persian: چخوركند) (Note: Also romanized as Chokhūr Kand; also known as Chokhūr Kandī, Chūkhūr Kand, and Chūkhūr Kandī) is a village in Chaldoran-e Shomali Rural District of the Central District in Chaldoran County, West Azerbaijan province, Iran.

== Demographics ==
=== Population ===
At the time of the 2006 National Census, the village's population was 343 in 57 households. The following census in 2011 counted 527 people in 89 households. The 2016 census measured the population of the village as 432 people in 96 households.
