= Beyg Kandi =

Beyg Kandi (Persian: بيگ كندي) may refer to:

- Beyg Kandi, East Azerbaijan
- Beyg Kandi Rud, East Azerbaijan Province
- Beyg Kandi, Qazvin
- Beyg Kandi, West Azerbaijan
