= Mokhur, Chaldoran =

Village in West Azerbaijan province, Iran

Mokhur Persian: مخور
- Village
- Location within Iran
- Coordinates: 38°54′49″N 44°23′57″E
- Country: Iran
- Province: West Azerbaijan
- County: Chaldoran
- District: Central
- Rural District: Chaldoran-e Jonubi

Population (2016)
  - Total: 1,225
- Time zone: UTC+3:30 (IRST)

Mokhur (Persian: مخور) (Note: Also romanized as Mokhvor; also known as Mokhor) is a village in Chaldoran-e Jonubi Rural District of the Central District in Chaldoran County, West Azerbaijan province, Iran.

== Etymology ==
According to Vladimir Minorsky, the name Mūkhor is derived from the Mongolian word muqur meaning "obtuse, short."

== Demographics ==
=== Population ===
At the time of the 2006 National Census, the village's population was 997 in 162 households. The following census in 2011 counted 1,166 people in 246 households. The 2016 census measured the population of the village as 1,225 people in 274 households. It was the most populous village in its rural district.
