= Mohammad Aqa =

Mohammad Aqa (Persian: محمداقا) may refer to:

- Mohammad Aqa Aqajari, Khuzestan Province
- Mohammad Aqa-ye Olya, West Azerbaijan Province
- Mohammad Aqa-ye Sofla, West Azerbaijan Province
