= Yumoridash =

Village in West Azerbaijan province, Iran

Yumoridash Persian: يومري داش
- Village
- Location within Iran
- Coordinates: 39°06′25″N 44°39′25″E
- Country: Iran
- Province: West Azerbaijan
- County: Chaldoran
- District: Central
- Rural District: Baba Jik

Population (2016)
  - Total: 206
- Time zone: UTC+3:30 (IRST)

Yumoridash (Persian: يومري داش) (Note: Also romanized as Yoomeridash, Yūmerī Dāsh, Yūmorī Dāsh, Yūmorīdāsh, and Yūmrī Dāsh; also known as Yumeru Dasht, Yūmūrīdāsh, and Yūmūry Dasht) is a village in Baba Jik Rural District of the Central District in Chaldoran County, West Azerbaijan province, Iran.

== Demographics ==
=== Population ===
At the time of the 2006 National Census, the village's population was 264 in 48 households. The following census in 2011 counted 199 people in 54 households. The 2016 census measured the population of the village as 206 people in 55 households.
