= Sheykh Saluy-e Olya =

Sheykh Saluy-e Olya شيخ سلوي عليا
- Village
- Location within Iran
- Coordinates: 38°59′33″N 44°12′00″E
- Country: Iran
- Province: West Azerbaijan
- County: Chaldoran
- Bakhsh: Central
- Rural District: Chaldoran-e Jonubi

Population (2006)
  - Total: 117
- Time zone: UTC+3:30 (IRST)
  - Summer (DST): UTC+4:30 (IRDT)

Sheykh Saluy-e Olya (Persian: شيخ سلوي عليا, also Romanized as Sheykh Salūy-e ‘Olyā and Sheikh Salooy Olya; also known as Shaikh Silu Yukāri, Sheykh Salū-ye Bālā, Sheykh Salū-ye ‘Olyā, Sheykh Selū-ye Bālā, and Sheykh Solū-ye Bālā) is a village in Chaldoran-e Jonubi Rural District, in the Central District of Chaldoran County, West Azerbaijan Province, Iran. At the 2006 census, its population was 117, in 30 families.
