= Emamqoli Kandi-ye Olya =

Emamqoli Kandi-ye Olya امامقلی کندی علیا
- Village
- Location within Iran
- Coordinates: 39°08′28″N 44°31′16″E
- Country: Iran
- Province: West Azerbaijan
- County: Chaldoran
- Bakhsh: Central
- Rural District: Chaldoran-e Shomali

Population (2006)
  - Total: 203
- Time zone: UTC+3:30 (IRST)
  - Summer (DST): UTC+4:30 (IRDT)

Emamqoli Kandi-ye Olya (Persian: امامقلی کندی علیا, also Romanized as Emāmqolī Kandī-ye ‘Olyā) is a village in Chaldoran-e Shomali Rural District, in the Central District of Chaldoran County, West Azerbaijan Province, Iran. At the 2006 census, its population was 203, in 45 families.
