= Delakverdi =

Village in West Azerbaijan province, Iran

Delakverdi Persian: دلك وردي
- Village
- Location within Iran
- Coordinates: 39°16′41″N 44°10′15″E
- Country: Iran
- Province: West Azerbaijan
- County: Chaldoran
- District: Dashtak
- Rural District: Avajiq-e Jonubi

Population (2016)
  - Total: 241
- Time zone: UTC+3:30 (IRST)

Delakverdi (Persian: دلك وردي) (Note: Also romanized as Delakverdī; also known as Dalek Vīrdī, Dilək Verdī (دیلک وردي) and Diləkverdi) is a village in Avajiq-e Jonubi Rural District of Dashtak District in Chaldoran County, West Azerbaijan province, Iran.

== Demographics ==
=== Population ===
At the time of the 2006 National Census, the village's population was 317 in 66 households. The following census in 2011 counted 281 people in 95 households. The 2016 census measured the population of the village as 241 people in 67 households.
