= Mashhadi Kandi =

Mashhadi Kandi (Persian: مشهدي كندي) may refer to:

- Mashhadi Kandi, East Azerbaijan
- Mashhadi Kandi, West Azerbaijan
