= Makhmur, Iran =

Makhmur مخمور
- Village
- Location within Iran
- Coordinates: 38°51′49″N 44°16′11″E
- Country: Iran
- Province: West Azerbaijan
- County: Chaldoran
- Bakhsh: Central
- Rural District: Chaldoran-e Jonubi

Population (2006)
  - Total: 330
- Time zone: UTC+3:30 (IRST)
  - Summer (DST): UTC+4:30 (IRDT)

Makhmur (Persian: مخمور, also Romanized as Makhmūr) is a village in Chaldoran-e Jonubi Rural District, in the Central District of Chaldoran County, West Azerbaijan Province, Iran. At the 2006 census, its population was 330, in 62 families.
