= Jaganlu, West Azerbaijan =

Jaganlu جگنلو
- Village
- Location within Iran
- Coordinates: 39°10′12″N 44°17′37″E
- Country: Iran
- Province: West Azerbaijan
- County: Chaldoran
- Bakhsh: Central
- Rural District: Chaldoran-e Shomali

Population (2006)
  - Total: 97
- Time zone: UTC+3:30 (IRST)
  - Summer (DST): UTC+4:30 (IRDT)

Jaganlu (Persian: جگنلو, also Romanized as Jaganlū; also known as Jagandlū) is a village in Chaldoran-e Shomali Rural District, in the Central District of Chaldoran County, West Azerbaijan Province, Iran. As of the 2006 census, its population was 97, in 21 families.
