= Takht-e Ravan-e Sofla =

Takht-e Ravan-e Sofla تختروان سفلي
- Village
- Location within Iran
- Coordinates: 39°08′37″N 44°19′12″E
- Country: Iran
- Province: West Azerbaijan
- County: Chaldoran
- Bakhsh: Central
- Rural District: Chaldoran-e Shomali

Population (2006)
  - Total: 70
- Time zone: UTC+3:30 (IRST)
  - Summer (DST): UTC+4:30 (IRDT)

Takht-e Ravan-e Sofla (Persian: تختروان سفلي, also Romanized as Takht-e Ravān-e Soflá) is a village in Chaldoran-e Shomali Rural District, in the Central District of Chaldoran County, West Azerbaijan Province, Iran. At the 2006 census, its population was 70, in 14 families.
