= Amukhanzi-ye Olya =

Amukhanzi-ye Olya عموخانزي عليا
- Village
- Location within Iran
- Coordinates: 39°02′08″N 44°14′42″E
- Country: Iran
- Province: West Azerbaijan
- County: Chaldoran
- Bakhsh: Central
- Rural District: Chaldoran-e Jonubi

Population (2006)
  - Total: 90
- Time zone: UTC+3:30 (IRST)
  - Summer (DST): UTC+4:30 (IRDT)

Amukhanzi-ye Olya (Persian: عموخانزي عليا, also Romanized as ‘Amūkhānzī-ye ‘Olyā) is a village in Chaldoran-e Jonubi Rural District, in the Central District of Chaldoran County, West Azerbaijan Province, Iran. At the 2006 census, its population was 90, in 21 families.
