= Baghlachi =

Baghlachi (Persian: بغلچي) may refer to:

- Baghlachi-ye Olya
- Baghlachi-ye Sofla
