= Reyhanluy-e Vosta =

Reyhanluy-e Vosta ريحانلوي وسطي
- Village
- Location within Iran
- Coordinates: 39°06′38″N 44°28′08″E
- Country: Iran
- Province: West Azerbaijan
- County: Chaldoran
- Bakhsh: Central
- Rural District: Chaldoran-e Shomali

Population (2006)
  - Total: 38
- Time zone: UTC+3:30 (IRST)
  - Summer (DST): UTC+4:30 (IRDT)

Reyhanluy-e Vosta (Persian: ريحانلوي وسطي, also Romanized as Reyḩānlūy-e Vosţá; also known as Reyḩānlū-ye Vasaţ and Reyḩanlū-ye Vosţá) is a village in Chaldoran-e Shomali Rural District, in the Central District of Chaldoran County, West Azerbaijan Province, Iran. At the 2006 census, its population was 38, in 11 families.
