= Anbar-e Maran =

Anbar-e Maran انبارماران
- Village
- Location within Iran
- Coordinates: 38°57′47″N 44°29′45″E
- Country: Iran
- Province: West Azerbaijan
- County: Chaldoran
- Bakhsh: Central
- Rural District: Chaldoran-e Jonubi

Population (2006)
  - Total: 176
- Time zone: UTC+3:30 (IRST)
  - Summer (DST): UTC+4:30 (IRDT)

Anbar-e Maran (Persian: انبارماران, also Romanized as Anbār-e Mārān; also known as Anbār-e Mīānī and Anbār-e Vasaţ) is a village in Chaldoran-e Jonubi Rural District, in the Central District of Chaldoran County, West Azerbaijan Province, Iran. At the 2006 census, its population was 176, in 27 families.
