= Babalu, Iran =

Village in West Azerbaijan province, Iran

Babalu Persian: بابالو
- Village
- Location within Iran
- Coordinates: 39°03′59″N 44°31′39″E
- Country: Iran
- Province: West Azerbaijan
- County: Chaldoran
- District: Central
- Rural District: Chaldoran-e Shomali

Population (2016)
  - Total: 355
- Time zone: UTC+3:30 (IRST)

Babalu (Persian: بابالو) (Note: Also romanized as Bābālū) is a village in Chaldoran-e Shomali Rural District of the Central District in Chaldoran County, West Azerbaijan province, Iran.

== Demographics ==
=== Population ===
At the time of the 2006 National Census, the village's population was 354 in 61 households. The following census in 2011 counted 362 people in 100 households. The 2016 census measured the population of the village as 355 people in 104 households.
