= Baduli =

Village in West Azerbaijan province, Iran

Baduli Persian: بدولي
- Village
- Location within Iran
- Coordinates: 39°21′01″N 44°13′56″E
- Country: Iran
- Province: West Azerbaijan
- County: Chaldoran
- District: Dashtak
- Rural District: Avajiq-e Shomali

Population (2016)
  - Total: 426
- Time zone: UTC+3:30 (IRST)

Baduli (Persian: بدولي) (Note: Also romanized as Badūlī and Bedavlī) is a village in Avajiq-e Shomali Rural District (Note: Formerly Avajiq Rural District) of Dashtak District in Chaldoran County, West Azerbaijan province, Iran.

== Demographics ==
=== Population ===
At the time of the 2006 National Census, the village's population was 421 in 106 households. The following census in 2011 counted 424 people in 118 households. The 2016 census measured the population of the village as 426 people in 127 households.
