= Amukhanzi =

Amukhanzi or Amu Khanzi (Persian: عموخانزي) may refer to:

- Amukhanzi-ye Olya
- Amukhanzi-ye Sofla
