= Qarahjah Veran-e Olya =

Qarahjah Veran-e Olya قره جه وران عليا
- Village
- Location within Iran
- Coordinates: 38°59′25″N 44°27′30″E
- Country: Iran
- Province: West Azerbaijan
- County: Chaldoran
- Bakhsh: Central
- Rural District: Chaldoran-e Jonubi

Population (2006)
  - Total: 166
- Time zone: UTC+3:30 (IRST)
  - Summer (DST): UTC+4:30 (IRDT)

Qarahjah Veran-e Olya (Persian: قره جه وران عليا, also Romanized as Qarahjah Verān-e ‘Olyā; also known as Qarahchah Verān-e Bālā, Qarahchah Verān-e ‘Olyā, and Qarehchah Verān-e Bālā) is a village in Chaldoran-e Jonubi Rural District, in the Central District of Chaldoran County, West Azerbaijan Province, Iran. At the 2006 census, its population was 166, in 22 families.
