= Qarah Tulki-ye Olya =

Qarah Tulki-ye Olya قره تولكي عليا
- Village
- Location within Iran
- Coordinates: 39°03′32″N 44°35′22″E
- Country: Iran
- Province: West Azerbaijan
- County: Chaldoran
- Bakhsh: Central
- Rural District: Baba Jik

Population (2006)
  - Total: 43
- Time zone: UTC+3:30 (IRST)
  - Summer (DST): UTC+4:30 (IRDT)

Qarah Tulki-ye Olya (Persian: قره تولكي عليا, also Romanized as Qarah Tūlkī-ye ‘Olyā and Qareh Tūlkī-ye ‘Olyā; also known as Ghareh Tavakol Olya, Kara Tulki, and Qareh Tūlkī-ye Tāzeh Kand) is a village in Baba Jik Rural District, in the Central District of Chaldoran County, West Azerbaijan Province, Iran. At the 2006 census, its population was 43, in 8 families.
