= Abbas Kandi, Baba Jik =

Abbas Kandi عباس كندي
- Village
- Location within Iran
- Coordinates: 39°03′13″N 44°37′40″E
- Country: Iran
- Province: West Azerbaijan
- County: Chaldoran
- Bakhsh: Central
- Rural District: Baba Jik

Population (2006)
  - Total: 83
- Time zone: UTC+3:30 (IRST)
  - Summer (DST): UTC+4:30 (IRDT)

Abbas Kandi (Persian: عباس كندي, also Romanized as ‘Abbās Kandī) is a village in Baba Jik Rural District, in the Central District of Chaldoran County, West Azerbaijan Province, Iran. At the 2006 census, its population was 83, in 17 families.
