= Abbas Kandi =

Abbas Kandi (Persian: عباس كندي) may refer to:

- Abbas Kandi, Ardabil
- Abbas Kandi, Baba Jik, Chaldoran County, West Azerbaijan Province
- Abbas Kandi, Chaldoran-e Shomali, Chaldoran County, West Azerbaijan Province
