= Mokhtar Kandi =

Mokhtar Kandi (Persian: مختار كندي) may refer to:

- Mokhtar Kandi, Chaldoran
- Mokhtar Kandi, Maku
