= Masoudabad, West Azerbaijan =

Masoudabad مسعوداباد
- village
- Location within Iran
- Coordinates: 39°12′15″N 44°13′43″E
- Country: Iran
- Province: West Azerbaijan
- County: Chaldoran
- Bakhsh: Dashtaki
- Rural District: Avajiq-e Jonubi

Population (2006)
  - Total: 48
- Time zone: UTC+3:30 (IRST)
  - Summer (DST): UTC+4:30 (IRDT)

Masoudabad (Persian: مسعوداباد, also Romanized as Masʿūdābād; also known as Maqşūdābād and Maqşūdābād-e Bālā) is a village in Avajiq-e Jonubi Rural District, Dashtaki District, Chaldoran County, West Azerbaijan Province, Iran. At the 2006 census, its population was 48, in 10 families.
