= Anbar-e Sofla =

Anbar-e Sofla انبارسفلي
- village
- Location within Iran
- Coordinates: 38°57′12″N 44°31′24″E
- Country: Iran
- Province: West Azerbaijan
- County: Chaldoran
- Bakhsh: Central
- Rural District: Chaldoran-e Jonubi

Population (2023)
  - Total: 0
- Time zone: UTC+3:30 (IRST)
  - Summer (DST): UTC+4:30 (IRDT)

Anbar-e Sofla (Persian: انبارسفلي, also Romanized as Anbār-e Soflá; also known as Anbār-e Pā'īn) is a village in Chaldoran-e Jonubi Rural District, in the Central District of Chaldoran County, West Azerbaijan Province, Iran. At the 2006 census, its population was 329, in 48 families.
