= Qerkh Bolagh, West Azerbaijan =

Village in West Azerbaijan province, Iran

Qerkh Bolagh Persian: قرخ بلاغ
- Village
- Location within Iran
- Coordinates: 39°01′57″N 44°33′52″E
- Country: Iran
- Province: West Azerbaijan
- County: Chaldoran
- District: Central
- Rural District: Baba Jik

Population (2016)
  - Total: 217
- Time zone: UTC+3:30 (IRST)

Qerkh Bolagh (Persian: قرخ بلاغ) (Note: Also romanized as Qarakh Bolāgh and Qerkh Bolāgh and ; also known as Gharakhbolagh, Kirkh Bulāk, Kirkh Bulāq, and Qīkh Bolagh) is a village in Baba Jik Rural District of the Central District in Chaldoran County, West Azerbaijan province, Iran.

== Demographics ==
=== Population ===
At the time of the 2006 National Census, the village's population was 231 in 52 households. The following census in 2011 counted 191 people in 63 households. The 2016 census measured the population of the village as 217 people in 72 households.
