= Aq Duz =

Aq Duz or Aqduz (Persian: اق دوز) may refer to:

- Aq Duz, Qazvin
- Aqduz, West Azerbaijan
