= Qarah Tulki =

Qarah Tulki or Qareh Tulki or Qareh Towlki (Persian: قره تولكي), also rendered as Kara Tulki or Ghareh Tavakol, may refer to:

- Qarah Tulki-ye Olya
- Qarah Tulki-ye Tazehkand
