= Qaleh Khach =

Village in West Azerbaijan province, Iran

Qaleh Khach Persian: قلعه خاچ
- Village
- Location within Iran
- Coordinates: 39°12′20″N 44°13′05″E
- Country: Iran
- Province: West Azerbaijan
- County: Chaldoran
- District: Dashtak
- Rural District: Avajiq-e Jonubi

Population (2016)
  - Total: 244
- Time zone: UTC+3:30 (IRST)

Qaleh Khach (Persian: قلعه خاچ) (Note: Also romanized as Qal‘eh Khāch; also known as Qalameh Khāch and Qalameh Qāch) is a village in Avajiq-e Jonubi Rural District of Dashtak District in Chaldoran County, West Azerbaijan province, Iran.

== Demographics ==
=== Population ===
At the time of the 2006 National Census, the village's population was 229 in 40 households. The following census in 2011 counted 241 people in 52 households. The 2016 census measured the population of the village as 244 people in 61 households.
