= Oruj Kandi =

Village in West Azerbaijan province, Iran

Oruj Kandi Persian: اروج کندی
- Village
- Location within Iran
- Coordinates: 39°15′53″N 44°13′31″E
- Country: Iran
- Province: West Azerbaijan
- County: Chaldoran
- District: Dashtak
- Rural District: Avajiq-e Jonubi

Population (2016)
  - Total: 253
- Time zone: UTC+3:30 (IRST)

Oruj Kandi (Persian: اروج کندی) (Note: Also romanized as Orooj Kandi and Orūj Kandī) is a village in Avajiq-e Jonubi Rural District of Dashtak District in Chaldoran County, West Azerbaijan province, Iran.

== Demographics ==
=== Population ===
At the time of the 2006 National Census, the village's population was 296 in 60 households. The following census in 2011 counted 282 people in 77 households. The 2016 census measured the population of the village as 253 people in 75 households.
