= Qoli Dizaji =

Village in West Azerbaijan province, Iran

Qoli Dizaji Persian: قلي ديزجي
- Village
- Location within Iran
- Coordinates: 39°18′16″N 44°10′42″E
- Country: Iran
- Province: West Azerbaijan
- County: Chaldoran
- District: Dashtak
- Rural District: Avajiq-e Jonubi

Population (2016)
  - Total: 200
- Time zone: UTC+3:30 (IRST)

Qoli Dizaji (Persian: قلي ديزجي) (Note: Also romanized as Qolī Dīzajī; also known as Qoli Dizeh Si (قلي ديزه سي) and Qolī Dīzaj (قلي ديزج)) is a village in Avajiq-e Jonubi Rural District of Dashtak District in Chaldoran County, West Azerbaijan province, Iran.

== Demographics ==
=== Population ===
At the time of the 2006 National Census, the village's population was 267 in 49 households. The following census in 2011 counted 214 people in 59 households. The 2016 census measured the population of the village as 200 people in 61 households.
