= Karan-e Sofla =

Karan-e Sofla كران سفلي
- Village
- Location within Iran
- Coordinates: 38°57′27″N 44°48′05″E
- Country: Iran
- Province: West Azerbaijan
- County: Chaldoran
- Bakhsh: Central
- Rural District: Baba Jik

Population (2006)
  - Total: 71
- Time zone: UTC+3:30 (IRST)
  - Summer (DST): UTC+4:30 (IRDT)

Karan-e Sofla (Persian: كران سفلي, also Romanized as Karān-e Soflá and Karān Soflá; also known as Ashāghi Karan, Karān-e Pā’īn, Karrān, Karrān-e Pā’īn, Karrān-e Vasaţ, Kerān-e Pā’īn, and Kerān Pā’īn) is a village in Baba Jik Rural District, in the Central District of Chaldoran County, West Azerbaijan Province, Iran. At the 2006 census, its population was 71, in 12 families.
