= Baghlachi-ye Sofla =

Baghlachi-ye Sofla بغلچي سفلي
- Village
- Location within Iran
- Coordinates: 38°51′54″N 44°22′02″E
- Country: Iran
- Province: West Azerbaijan
- County: Chaldoran
- Bakhsh: Central
- Rural District: Chaldoran-e Jonubi

Population (2006)
  - Total: 283
- Time zone: UTC+3:30 (IRST)
  - Summer (DST): UTC+4:30 (IRDT)

Baghlachi-ye Sofla (Persian: بغلچي سفلي, also Romanized as Baghlachī-ye Soflá) is a village in Chaldoran-e Jonubi Rural District, in the Central District of Chaldoran County, West Azerbaijan Province, Iran. At the 2006 census, its population was 283, in 49 families.
