= Mashhadi Kandi, West Azerbaijan =

Mashhadi Kandi مشهدي كندي
- Village
- Location within Iran
- Coordinates: 39°03′23″N 44°40′20″E
- Country: Iran
- Province: West Azerbaijan
- County: Chaldoran
- Bakhsh: Central
- Rural District: Baba Jik

Population (2006)
  - Total: 81
- Time zone: UTC+3:30 (IRST)
  - Summer (DST): UTC+4:30 (IRDT)

Mashhadi Kandi (Persian: مشهدي كندي, also Romanized as Mashhadī Kandī) is a village in Baba Jik Rural District, in the Central District of Chaldoran County, West Azerbaijan Province, Iran. At the 2006 census, its population was 81, in 16 families.
