= Takht-e Ravan =

Takht-e Ravan (Persian: تختروان) may refer to:

- Takht-e Ravan-e Olya
- Takht-e Ravan-e Sofla
- Takhtrawan, various forms of Persian, Middle Eastern, and Indian litters
