= Shadluy =

Shadluy (Persian: شادلوي), also rendered as Shadlu, may refer to:

- Shadluy-e Olya
- Shadluy-e Sofla
