= Abbas Kandi, Chaldoran-e Shomali =

Abbas Kandi عباس كندي
- Village
- Location within Iran
- Coordinates: 39°02′23″N 44°25′36″E
- Country: Iran
- Province: West Azerbaijan
- County: Chaldoran
- Bakhsh: Central
- Rural District: Chaldoran-e Shomali

Population (2006)
  - Total: 269
- Time zone: UTC+3:30 (IRST)
  - Summer (DST): UTC+4:30 (IRDT)

Abbas Kandi (Persian: عباس كندي, also Romanized as ‘Abbās Kandī) is a village in Chaldoran-e Shomali Rural District, in the Central District of Chaldoran County, West Azerbaijan Province, Iran. At the 2006 census, its population was 269, in 56 families.
