= Halhal-e Olya =

Halhal-e Olya حالحال عليا
- Village
- Location within Iran
- Coordinates: 39°17′55″N 44°12′51″E
- Country: Iran
- Province: West Azerbaijan
- County: Chaldoran
- Bakhsh: Dashtaki
- Rural District: Avajiq-e Jonubi

Population (2006)
  - Total: 92
- Time zone: UTC+3:30 (IRST)
  - Summer (DST): UTC+4:30 (IRDT)

Halhal-e Olya (Persian: حالحال عليا, also Romanized as Ḩālḩāl-e ‘Olyā) is a village in Avajiq-e Jonubi Rural District, Dashtaki District, Chaldoran County, West Azerbaijan Province, Iran. At the 2006 census, its population was 92, in 16 families.
