= Anbari =

Anbari may refer to:

- Anbari, Hormozgan
- Anbari, South Khorasan
- Anbari (tribe), an Arab tribe
- Abu Ali al-Anbari, a leader of ISIL

== See also ==
- Anbar (disambiguation)
