= Halhal, Iran =

Halhal (Persian: حالحال) in Iran, may refer to:

- Halhal-e Olya
- Halhal-e Sofla
