= Sheykh Saluy =

Sheykh Saluy or Sheikh Salooy (Persian: شيخ سلوي), also rendered as Shaikh Silu or Sheykh Salu or Sheykh Selu or Sheykh Solu, may refer to:

- Sheykh Saluy-e Olya
- Sheykh Saluy-e Sofla
