= Malhamlu-ye Olya =

Village in West Azerbaijan province, Iran

Malhamlu-ye Olya Persian: ملحملوعليا
- Village
- Location within Iran
- Coordinates: 38°52′51″N 44°25′33″E
- Country: Iran
- Province: West Azerbaijan
- County: Chaldoran
- District: Central
- Rural District: Chaldoran-e Jonubi

Population (2016)
  - Total: 404
- Time zone: UTC+3:30 (IRST)

Malhamlu-ye Olya (Persian: ملحملوعليا) (Note: Also romanized as Malḩamlū-ye ‘Olyā; also known as Malḩamlū-ye Bālā) is a village in Chaldoran-e Jonubi Rural District of the Central District in Chaldoran County, West Azerbaijan province, Iran.

== Demographics ==
=== Population ===
At the time of the 2006 National Census, the village's population was 270 in 45 households. The following census in 2011 counted 371 people in 92 households. The 2016 census measured the population of the village as 404 people in 110 households.
