= Gal Ashaqi =

Village in West Azerbaijan province, Iran

Gal Ashaqi Persian: گل اشاقي
- Village
- Location within Iran
- Coordinates: 39°04′50″N 44°20′03″E
- Country: Iran
- Province: West Azerbaijan
- County: Chaldoran
- District: Central
- Rural District: Chaldoran-e Shomali

Population (2016)
  - Total: 359
- Time zone: UTC+3:30 (IRST)

Gal Ashaqi (Persian: گل اشاقي) (Note: Also romanized as Gal Āshāqī and Galāshaqī) is a village in Chaldoran-e Shomali Rural District of the Central District in Chaldoran County, West Azerbaijan province, Iran.

== Demographics ==
=== Population ===
At the time of the 2006 National Census, the village's population was 401 in 77 households. The following census in 2011 counted 363 people in 89 households. The 2016 census measured the population of the village as 359 people in 111 households.
