= Tazeh Kand, Chaldoran-e Shomali =

Village in West Azerbaijan province, Iran

Tazeh Kand Persian: تازه كند
- Village
- Location within Iran
- Coordinates: 39°05′55″N 44°21′57″E
- Country: Iran
- Province: West Azerbaijan
- County: Chaldoran
- District: Central
- Rural District: Chaldoran-e Shomali

Population (2016)
  - Total: 436
- Time zone: UTC+3:30 (IRST)

Tazeh Kand (Persian: تازه كند) (Note: Also romanized as Tazehkand and Tāzehkand; also known as Tāzehkand-e Chaghāl (تازه كند چغال)) is a village in Chaldoran-e Shomali Rural District of the Central District in Chaldoran County, West Azerbaijan province, Iran.

== Demographics ==
=== Population ===
At the time of the 2006 National Census, the village's population was 482 in 104 households. The following census in 2011 counted 493 people in 117 households. The 2016 census measured the population of the village as 436 people in 118 households.
