= Anbarak =

Anbarak (Persian: انبارك) may refer to:

- Anbarak, Bushehr
- Anbarak, Hormozgan
