= Mohammad Aqa-ye Sofla =

Mohammad Aqa-ye Sofla محمداقاسفلي
- Village
- Country: Iran
- Province: West Azerbaijan
- County: Chaldoran
- Bakhsh: Central
- Rural District: Baba Jik

Population (2006)
  - Total: 22
- Time zone: UTC+3:30 (IRST)
  - Summer (DST): UTC+4:30 (IRDT)

Mohammad Aqa-ye Sofla (Persian: محمداقاسفلي, also Romanized as Moḩammad Āqā-ye Soflá) is a village in Baba Jik Rural District, in the Central District of Chaldoran County, West Azerbaijan Province, Iran. At the 2006 census, its population was 22, in 6 families.
