= İncə =

İncə or Incha or Indzha may refer to:

- İncə, Goychay, Azerbaijan
- İncə, Shaki, Azerbaijan
- Hinqar, Azerbaijan
- Incheh (disambiguation), Iran
