= Amukhanzi-ye Sofla =

Amukhanzi-ye Sofla عموخانزي سفلي
- Village
- Location within Iran
- Coordinates: 39°02′33″N 44°15′15″E
- Country: Iran
- Province: West Azerbaijan
- County: Chaldoran
- Bakhsh: Central
- Rural District: Chaldoran-e Jonubi

Population (2006)
  - Total: 113
- Time zone: UTC+3:30 (IRST)
  - Summer (DST): UTC+4:30 (IRDT)

Amukhanzi-ye Sofla (Persian: عموخانزي سفلي, also Romanized as ‘Amūkhānzī-ye Soflá; also known as ‘Amū Khanzī-ye Pā'īn) is a village in Chaldoran-e Jonubi Rural District, in the Central District of Chaldoran County, West Azerbaijan Province, Iran. At the 2006 census, its population was 113, in 22 families.
