= Jaganlu =

Jaganlu (Persian: جگنلو) may refer to:

- Jaganlu, Hamadan
- Jaganlu, West Azerbaijan
- Jaganlu-ye Kord, West Azerbaijan Province
