= Qezel Bolagh, West Azerbaijan =

Village in West Azerbaijan province, Iran

Qezel Bolagh Persian: قزل بلاغ
- Village
- Location within Iran
- Coordinates: 39°22′58″N 44°13′17″E
- Country: Iran
- Province: West Azerbaijan
- County: Chaldoran
- District: Dashtak
- Rural District: Avajiq-e Shomali

Population (2016)
  - Total: 256
- Time zone: UTC+3:30 (IRST)

Qezel Bolagh (Persian: قزل بلاغ) (Note: Also romanized as Qezel Bolāgh; also known as Ghezel Bolagh, Kizil Bulāk, and Qizil Bualāq) is a village in Avajiq-e Shomali Rural District (Note: Formerly Avajiq Rural District) of Dashtak District in Chaldoran County, West Azerbaijan province, Iran.

== Demographics ==
=== Population ===
At the time of the 2006 National Census, the village's population was 360 in 87 households. The following census in 2011 counted 322 people in 97 households. The 2016 census measured the population of the village as 256 people in 74 households.
