= Takht-e Ravan-e Olya =

Village in West Azerbaijan province, Iran

Takht-e Ravan-e Olya Persian: تختروان عليا
- Village
- Location within Iran
- Coordinates: 39°08′44″N 44°18′10″E
- Country: Iran
- Province: West Azerbaijan
- County: Chaldoran
- District: Central
- Rural District: Chaldoran-e Shomali

Population (2016)
  - Total: 381
- Time zone: UTC+3:30 (IRST)

Takht-e Ravan-e Olya (Persian: تختروان عليا) (Note: Also romanized as Takht-e Ravān-e ‘Olyā) is a village in Chaldoran-e Shomali Rural District of the Central District in Chaldoran County, West Azerbaijan province, Iran.

== Demographics ==
=== Population ===
At the time of the 2006 National Census, the village's population was 410 in 68 households. The following census in 2011 counted 419 people in 83 households. The 2016 census measured the population of the village as 381 people in 83 households.
