= Khezerlu, Chaldoran =

Village in West Azerbaijan province, Iran

Khezerlu Persian: خضرلو
- Village
- Location within Iran
- Coordinates: 39°02′33″N 44°20′16″E
- Country: Iran
- Province: West Azerbaijan
- County: Chaldoran
- District: Central
- Rural District: Chaldoran-e Jonubi

Population (2016)
  - Total: 416
- Time zone: UTC+3:30 (IRST)

Khezerlu (Persian: خضرلو) (Note: Also romanized as Khezerloo, Kheẕerlū, and Khezerlū; also known as Khadralī, Khedr ‘Alī, Khezerlū-ye Pā’īn, Khezerlū-ye Soflá, and Khidr ‘Alī) is a village in, and the capital of, Chaldoran-e Jonubi Rural District in the Central District of Chaldoran County, West Azerbaijan province, Iran.

== Demographics ==
=== Population ===
At the time of the 2006 National Census, the village's population was 458 in 93 households. The following census in 2011 counted 483 people in 144 households. The 2016 census measured the population of the village as 416 people in 140 households.
