= Shadluy-e Sofla =

Village in West Azerbaijan province, Iran

Shadluy-e Sofla Persian: شادلوي سفلي
- Village
- Location within Iran
- Coordinates: 39°16′41″N 44°14′11″E
- Country: Iran
- Province: West Azerbaijan
- County: Chaldoran
- District: Dashtak
- Rural District: Avajiq-e Jonubi

Population (2016)
  - Total: 310
- Time zone: UTC+3:30 (IRST)

Shadluy-e Sofla (Persian: شادلوي سفلي) (Note: Also romanized as Shādlūy-e Soflá; also known as Shādlū-ye Soflá) is a village in, and the capital of, Avajiq-e Jonubi Rural District in Dashtak District of Chaldoran County, West Azerbaijan province, Iran.

== Demographics ==
=== Population ===
At the time of the 2006 National Census, the village's population was 374 in 77 households. The following census in 2011 counted 294 people in 77 households. The 2016 census measured the population of the village as 310 people in 83 households. It was the most populous village in its rural district.
