= Maqsudabad-e Bala =

Maqsudabad-e Bala (Persian: مقصودابادبالا) may refer to:

- Maqsudabad-e Bala, Razavi Khorasan
- Maqsudabad-e Bala, West Azerbaijan
