= Anbar =

Anbar may refer to:

== Given name ==
- Anbar Majeed Khan Niazi, Pakistani politician
- Anbar Saeed (1959–2026), Kuwaiti footballer

== Places and jurisdictions ==
=== Iraq ===
- Anbar (town), town near Baghdad, Iraq
- Al Anbar Governorate, province in Iraq

=== Elsewhere ===
- Anbar, Iran (disambiguation)
- Anbar, Swabi, Pakistan
- Anbar, Kocaköy, Turkey

== See also ==
- Anbari (disambiguation)
- Anwar (disambiguation)
