= Qaranqu =

Village in West Azerbaijan province, Iran

Qaranqu Persian: قرنقو
- Village
- Location within Iran
- Coordinates: 39°01′03″N 44°43′21″E
- Country: Iran
- Province: West Azerbaijan
- County: Chaldoran
- District: Central
- Rural District: Baba Jik

Population (2016)
  - Total: 473
- Time zone: UTC+3:30 (IRST)

Qaranqu (Persian: قرنقو) (Note: Also romanized as Qaranqū; also known as Gharanghoo, Karangi, Qarāngū, Qarānkū, and Qarengi) is a village in, and the capital of, Baba Jik Rural District in the Central District of Chaldoran County, West Azerbaijan province, Iran.

== Demographics ==
=== Population ===
At the time of the 2006 National Census, the village's population was 538 in 103 households. The following census in 2011 counted 412 people in 135 households. The 2016 census measured the population of the village as 473 people in 153 households. It was the most populous village in its rural district.
