= Tazeh Kand, Baba Jik =

Tazeh Kand تازه كند
- Village
- Location within Iran
- Coordinates: 39°04′44″N 44°35′34″E
- Country: Iran
- Province: West Azerbaijan
- County: Chaldoran
- Bakhsh: Central
- Rural District: Baba Jik

Population (2006)
  - Total: 20
- Time zone: UTC+3:30 (IRST)
  - Summer (DST): UTC+4:30 (IRDT)

Tazeh Kand (Persian: تازه كند, also Romanized as Tāzeh Kand; also known as Mokhtār Kandī, Qarah Tūlkī-ye Tāzehkand, and Qareh Tūlkī) is a village in Baba Jik Rural District, in the Central District of Chaldoran County, West Azerbaijan Province, Iran. At the 2006 census, its population was 20, in 6 families.
