= Aqduz, West Azerbaijan =

Village in West Azerbaijan province, Iran

Aqduz Persian: اق دوز
- Village
- Location within Iran
- Coordinates: 39°10′42″N 44°16′07″E
- Country: Iran
- Province: West Azerbaijan
- County: Chaldoran
- District: Central
- Rural District: Chaldoran-e Shomali

Population (2016)
  - Total: 319
- Time zone: UTC+3:30 (IRST)

Aqduz (Persian: اق دوز) (Note: Also romanized as Āqdūz; also known as Āghdūz (غدوز)) is a village in Chaldoran-e Shomali Rural District of the Central District in Chaldoran County, West Azerbaijan province, Iran.

== Demographics ==
=== Population ===
At the time of the 2006 National Census, the village's population was 290 in 57 households. The following census in 2011 counted 297 people in 62 households. The 2016 census measured the population of the village as 319 people in 72 households.
