= Incheh-ye Sofla, West Azerbaijan =

Incheh-ye Sofla اينچه سفلي
- Village
- Location within Iran
- Coordinates: 39°01′16″N 44°32′10″E
- Country: Iran
- Province: West Azerbaijan
- County: Chaldoran
- Bakhsh: Central
- Rural District: Chaldoran-e Shomali

Population (2006)
  - Total: 116
- Time zone: UTC+3:30 (IRST)
  - Summer (DST): UTC+4:30 (IRDT)

Incheh-ye Sofla (Persian: اينچه سفلي, also Romanized as Īncheh-ye Soflá; also known as Īncheh-ye Rostam Beyg and Īnjeh-ye Soflá) is a village in Chaldoran-e Shomali Rural District, in the Central District of Chaldoran County, West Azerbaijan Province, Iran. At the 2006 census, its population was 116, in 25 families.
