= Safu (disambiguation) =

Safu is a village in Iran.

Safu or SAFU may also refer to:

- Safu, fictional character in Japanese novel series No. 6
- Student Association of Flinders University, former Australian student organisation
- Secure Asset Fund for Users, emergency protection fund from Binance
- South Australian Farmers Union, owners of brand name Farmers Union
- Safu, a fruit (short for Safous)

== People with the surname ==
- Chantal Safu, Democratic Republic of Congo politician
