= Incheh-ye Olya =

Incheh-ye Olya (Persian: اينچه عليا) may refer to:

- Incheh-ye Olya, North Khorasan
- Incheh-ye Olya, West Azerbaijan
- Incheh-ye Olya, Maku, West Azerbaijan Province
- Incheh-ye Olya, Zanjan
