= Qusha Bolagh-e Olya =

Village in West Azerbaijan province, Iran

Qusha Bolagh-e Olya Persian: قوشابلاغ عليا
- Village
- Location within Iran
- Coordinates: 39°00′35″N 44°45′23″E
- Country: Iran
- Province: West Azerbaijan
- County: Chaldoran
- District: Central
- Rural District: Baba Jik

Population (2016)
  - Total: 207
- Time zone: UTC+3:30 (IRST)

Qusha Bolagh-e Olya (Persian: قوشابلاغ عليا) (Note: Also romanized as Qūshā Bolāgh-e ‘Olyā; also known as Qūshā Bolāgh-e Bālā) is a village in Baba Jik Rural District of the Central District in Chaldoran County, West Azerbaijan province, Iran.

== Demographics ==
=== Population ===
At the time of the 2006 National Census, the village's population was 351 in 62 households. The following census in 2011 counted 253 people in 70 households. The 2016 census measured the population of the village as 207 people in 62 households.
