= Qarahjah Veran-e Sofla =

Village in West Azerbaijan province, Iran

Qarahjah Veran-e Sofla Persian: قره جه وران سفلي
- Village
- Location within Iran
- Country: Iran
- Province: West Azerbaijan
- County: Chaldoran
- District: Central
- Rural District: Chaldoran-e Jonubi

Population (2016)
  - Total: 930
- Time zone: UTC+3:30 (IRST)

Qarahjah Veran-e Sofla (Persian: قره جه وران سفلي) (Note: Also romanized as Qarahjah Verān-e Soflá; also known as Qarah Chahverān-e Soflá) is a village in Chaldoran-e Jonubi Rural District of the Central District in Chaldoran County, West Azerbaijan province, Iran.

== Demographics ==
=== Population ===
At the time of the 2006 National Census, the village's population was 679 in 113 households. The following census in 2011 counted 970 people in 206 households. The 2016 census measured the population of the village as 930 people in 212 households.
