= Saremsaqlu =

Saremsaqlu or Sarem Saqlu (Persian: سارمساقلو) may refer to:

- Sarem Saqlu, West Azerbaijan
- Saremsaqlu, Zanjan
