= Karangi =

Karangi may refer to:

- Karangi, New South Wales, Australia
- Karangi, India
- Karangi, Iran, a village in West Azerbaijan Province, Iran
