= Sheykh Saluy-e Sofla =

Village in West Azerbaijan province, Iran

Sheykh Saluy-e Sofla Persian: شيخ سلوي سفلي
- Village
- Location within Iran
- Coordinates: 38°57′56″N 44°12′33″E
- Country: Iran
- Province: West Azerbaijan
- County: Chaldoran
- District: Central
- Rural District: Chaldoran-e Jonubi

Population (2016)
  - Total: 455
- Time zone: UTC+3:30 (IRST)

Sheykh Saluy-e Sofla (Persian: شيخ سلوي سفلي) (Note: Also romanized as Sheikh Salooy Sofla and Sheykh Salūy-e Soflá; also known as Shaikh Silu Ashāghi, Sheykh Salū-ye Pā”īn, Sheykh Salū-ye Soflá, Sheykh Selū-ye Pā'īn, Sheykh Solū, Sheykh Solū-ye Pā”īn, and Sheykh Solū-ye Soflá) is a village in Chaldoran-e Jonubi Rural District of the Central District in Chaldoran County, West Azerbaijan province, Iran.

== Demographics ==
=== Population ===
At the time of the 2006 National Census, the village's population was 387 in 69 households. The following census in 2011 counted 471 people in 98 households. The 2016 census measured the population of the village as 455 people in 109 households.
