= Incheh-ye Sofla =

Incheh-ye Sofla (Persian: اينچه سفلي) may refer to:

- Incheh-ye Sofla, North Khorasan
- Incheh-ye Sofla, West Azerbaijan
- Incheh-ye Sofla, Maku, West Azerbaijan Province
- Incheh-ye Sofla, Zanjan
