= Beyg Kandi, West Azerbaijan =

Village in West Azerbaijan province, Iran

Beyg Kandi Persian: بيگ كندي
- Village
- Location within Iran
- Coordinates: 39°20′29″N 44°08′54″E
- Country: Iran
- Province: West Azerbaijan
- County: Chaldoran
- District: Dashtak
- Rural District: Avajiq-e Shomali

Population (2016)
  - Total: 461
- Time zone: UTC+3:30 (IRST)

Beyg Kandi (Persian: بيگ كندي) (Note: Also romanized as Beyg Kandī; also known as Beyk Kandī) is a village in Avajiq-e Shomali Rural District (Note: Formerly Avajiq Rural District) of Dashtak District in Chaldoran County, West Azerbaijan province, Iran.

== Demographics ==
=== Population ===
At the time of the 2006 National Census, the village's population was 470 in 96 households. The following census in 2011 counted 417 people in 130 households. The 2016 census measured the population of the village as 461 people in 144 households.
