= Khan Amir =

Khan Amir (Persian: خان امير) may refer to:

- Khan Amir, Lorestan
- Khan Amir, East Azerbaijan
- Khan Amir, West Azerbaijan
