= Makhmur =

Makhmur may refer to:

- Makhmur, Iran
- Makhmur, Iraq
