= Khezerlu-ye Sofla =

Khezerlu-ye Sofla (Persian: خضرلو سفلي) may refer to:

- Khezerlu-ye Sofla, Chaldoran
- Khezerlu-ye Sofla, Showt
