= Keran =

Keran may refer to:

- Keran, Neelum Valley a town in Azad Kashmir, Pakistan
- Keran, Jammu and Kashmir, a village Jammu and Kashmir, India
- Keran, Queen of Armenia, 13th-century Armenian queen
- Kéran Prefecture, a prefecture of Togo
- Kéran National Park a protected area in Togo
- Keran, Iran (disambiguation)
