= Siah Cheshmeh =

City in West Azerbaijan province, Iran

Siah Cheshmeh Persian: سيه چشمه
- City
- Location within Iran
- Coordinates: 39°03′43″N 44°22′57″E
- Country: Iran
- Province: West Azerbaijan
- County: Chaldoran
- District: Central

Population (2016)
  - Total: 17,804
- Time zone: UTC+3:30 (IRST)

Siah Cheshmeh (Persian: سيه چشمه) (Note: Also romanized as Seyah Cheshmah, Siāh Chashmeh, Sīāh Cheshmeh, and Sīyah Cheshmeh; Azerbaijani: Kara Aineh and Qareh Eynī; and Armenian: Ղարէին) is a city in the Central District of Chaldoran County, West Azerbaijan province, Iran, serving as capital of both the county and the district.

== Demographics ==
=== Population ===
At the time of the 2006 National Census, the city's population was 14,189 in 3,024 households. The following census in 2011 counted 15,786 people in 3,733 households. The 2016 census measured the population of the city as 17,804 people in 4,608 households.

== Climate ==
Siah Cheshmeh has a weather station operating since 2002. Following data is based on observations in 2002-2016 period.

The climate in Chaldoran region is characterized by cold freezing winters with low precipitation. Subzero temperatures are common from November to April. Daily maximum temperatures may also fall below freezing in winter. The weather in summer is warm during the day and cool at night with mean minimum temperature between 13.0 °C (55.4 °F) and 15.0 °C (59.0 °F) in mid-summer. Precipitation is highest in spring and early summer and is lowest in winter.
