= Incheh-ye Olya, West Azerbaijan =

Village in West Azerbaijan province, Iran

Incheh-ye Olya Persian: اينچه عليا
- Village
- Location within Iran
- Coordinates: 39°01′11″N 44°31′21″E
- Country: Iran
- Province: West Azerbaijan
- County: Chaldoran
- District: Central
- Rural District: Chaldoran-e Shomali

Population (2016)
  - Total: 322
- Time zone: UTC+3:30 (IRST)

Incheh-ye Olya (Persian: اينچه عليا) (Note: Also romanized as Īncheh-ye ‘Olyā; also known as Īncheh-ye Salīm (اينچه سليم) and Īnjeh-ye ‘Olyā) is a village in Chaldoran-e Shomali Rural District of the Central District in Chaldoran County, West Azerbaijan province, Iran.

== Demographics ==
=== Population ===
At the time of the 2006 National Census, the village's population was 341 in 56 households. The following census in 2011 counted 327 people in 63 households. The 2016 census measured the population of the village as 322 people in 83 households.
