= İncə, Shaki =

İncə
- Municipality
- Location within Azerbaijan Location within Shaki-Zagatala Economic Region
- Coordinates: 41°15′18″N 47°06′29″E
- Country: Azerbaijan
- Rayon: Shaki

Population
  - Total: 1,281
- Time zone: UTC+4 (AZT)
  - Summer (DST): UTC+5 (AZT)

İncə (also, Incha and Indzha) is a village and municipality in the Shaki Rayon of Azerbaijan. It has a population of 1,281.İncə, Shaki is similar to these settlements: Sarıca, Azerbaijan, Qozlubulaq, Qaratorpaq and more.
