= Anbarak, Bushehr =

Anbarak دهیار:غلامعی جعفری
- Village
- Location within Iran
- Coordinates: 28°51′01″N 51°11′30″E
- Country: Iran
- Province: Bushehr
- County: Tangestan
- Bakhsh: Central
- Rural District: Baghak

Population (2006)
  - Total: 349
- Time zone: UTC+3:30 (IRST)
  - Summer (DST): UTC+4:30 (IRDT)

Anbarak (Persian: انبارك, also Romanized as Anbārak; also known as Ambārak and Ambārka) is a village in Baghak Rural District, in the Central District of Tangestan County, Bushehr Province, Iran. At the 2006 census, its population was 349, in 83 families.
