= Ammari, Iran =

Ammari عماري
- Village
- Location within Iran
- Coordinates: 32°19′13″N 58°50′18″E
- Country: Iran
- Province: South Khorasan
- County: Khusf
- Bakhsh: Jolgeh-e Mazhan
- Rural District: Qaleh Zari

Population (2006)
  - Total: 50
- Time zone: UTC+3:30 (IRST)
  - Summer (DST): UTC+4:30 (IRDT)

Ammari (Persian: عماري, also Romanized as ‘Ammārī; also known as Ambāri and Anbārī) is a village in Qaleh Zari Rural District, Jolgeh-e Mazhan District, Khusf County, South Khorasan Province, Iran. At the 2006 census, its population was 50, in 17 families.
