= Avajiq =

City in West Azerbaijan province, Iran

Avajiq Persian: آواجيق
- City
- Location within Iran
- Coordinates: 39°19′57″N 44°09′17″E
- Country: Iran
- Province: West Azerbaijan
- County: Chaldoran
- District: Dashtak
- Established as a city: 2002

Population (2016)
  - Total: 1,663
- Time zone: UTC+3:30 (IRST)

Avajiq (Persian: آواجيق) (Note: Formerly Arab Dizaj (عرب دیزج), also romanized as ‘Arab Dīzaj, and ‘Arab-e Dīzaj; also known as Arāb Dizeh, ‘Arab-e Dīzehsī, and ‘Arab Dizehsī; also formerly Kelisa Kandi (کلیسا کندی); Azerbaijani: Avacıq) is a city in, and the capital of, Dashtak District in Chaldoran County, West Azerbaijan province, Iran. The village of Kelisa Kandi was converted to a city in 2002 and is near the Turkish border, some 25 kilometres (16 mi) south of the town of Doğubeyazıt in Turkey. It is the westernmost city in Iran.

== History ==
Avajiq was formerly the seat of the Iran "Warden of the Marches" for the Turkish border.

== Demographics ==
=== Ethnicity ===
It is populated by Azerbaijanis.

=== Population ===
At the time of the 2006 National Census, the city's population was 1,649 in 377 households. The following census in 2011 counted 1,516 people in 419 households. The 2016 census measured the population of the city as 1,663 people in 486 households.
