= Qezel Bolagh, Divandarreh =

Qezel Bolagh قزلبلاغ
- Village
- Location within Iran
- Coordinates: 35°48′28″N 46°46′06″E
- Country: Iran
- Province: Kurdistan
- County: Divandarreh
- Bakhsh: Saral
- Rural District: Saral

Population (2006)
  - Total: 410
- Time zone: UTC+3:30 (IRST)
  - Summer (DST): UTC+4:30 (IRDT)

Qezel Bolagh (Persian: قزلبلاغ, also Romanized as Qezel Bolāgh; also known as Qezel Bolāq) is a village in Saral Rural District, Saral District, Divandarreh County, Kurdistan Province, Iran. At the 2006 census, its population was 410, in 78 families. The village is populated by Kurds.
