= Qusheh Bolagh, Kaleybar =

Qusheh Bolagh قوشه بلاغ
- Village
- Location within Iran
- Coordinates: 39°04′33″N 47°17′42″E
- Country: Iran
- Province: East Azerbaijan
- County: Kaleybar
- Bakhsh: Abish Ahmad
- Rural District: Abish Ahmad

Population (2006)
  - Total: 467
- Time zone: UTC+3:30 (IRST)
  - Summer (DST): UTC+4:30 (IRDT)

Qusheh Bolagh (Persian: قوشه بلاغ, also Romanized as Qūsheh Bolāgh; also known as Qūshā Bolāgh and Qūsheh Bāyrām) is a village in Abish Ahmad Rural District, Abish Ahmad District, Kaleybar County, East Azerbaijan Province, Iran. At the 2006 census, its population was 467, in 111 families.
