= Anbar, West Azerbaijan =

Anbar انبار
- Village
- Location within Iran
- Coordinates: 36°37′47″N 46°10′43″E
- Country: Iran
- Province: West Azerbaijan
- County: Bukan
- Bakhsh: Simmineh
- Rural District: Akhtachi-ye Sharqi

Population (2006)
  - Total: 233
- Time zone: UTC+3:30 (IRST)
  - Summer (DST): UTC+4:30 (IRDT)

Anbar (Persian: انبار, also Romanized as Anbār; also known as Anbār-e Soflá) is a village in Akhtachi-ye Sharqi Rural District, Simmineh District, Bukan County, West Azerbaijan Province, Iran. At the 2006 census, its population was 233, in 36 families.

== Activities ==
Being in the vicinity of Majid Khan river, has turned Anbar into a valuable place with fertile farms for farming. The majority of people in Anbar are normally engaged in farming from Spring till the mid-fall. The major farming products of this village are sugar beet, Alfalfa, wheat and recently potato.

Anbar has cold winters which provides a good environment for young people for indoor games and activities. Joraben(جورابین) is the most popular game played by villagers in winter. They normally gather together in the CheqeXane(چقه خانه) which is a place provided for gatherings and play there.

== History ==
Because of a heavy flood in 1972, a big part of villagers moved to a higher place, next to Anbar called Gerd Ghabran. Anbar has always been under the threat of flood over the years.

== Notable people ==
- Shekh Ahmad kour(شیخ احمد کور)
- Mamosta Mohammad Nouri(ماموستا محمد نوری)
