= Mashhadi Kandi, East Azerbaijan =

Mashhadi Kandi مشهدي كندي
- Village
- Location within Iran
- Coordinates: 38°00′19″N 47°45′45″E
- Country: Iran
- Province: East Azerbaijan
- County: Sarab
- Bakhsh: Central
- Rural District: Sain

Population (2006)
  - Total: 77
- Time zone: UTC+3:30 (IRST)
  - Summer (DST): UTC+4:30 (IRDT)

Mashhadi Kandi (Persian: مشهدي كندي, also Romanized as Mashhadī Kandī) is a village in Sain Rural District, in the Central District of Sarab County, East Azerbaijan Province, Iran. At the 2006 census, its population was 77, in 18 families.
