= Incheh, Keshavarz =

Incheh اينچه
- Village
- Location within Iran
- Coordinates: 36°48′55″N 46°36′01″E
- Country: Iran
- Province: West Azerbaijan
- County: Shahin Dezh
- Bakhsh: Keshavarz
- Rural District: Chaharduli

Population (2006)
  - Total: 85
- Time zone: UTC+3:30 (IRST)
  - Summer (DST): UTC+4:30 (IRDT)

Incheh (Persian: اينچه, also Romanized as Īncheh; also known as Īncheh-ye Morād Khān) is a village in Chaharduli Rural District, Keshavarz District, Shahin Dezh County, West Azerbaijan Province, Iran. At the 2006 census, its population was 85, in 22 families.
