= Qezel Bolagh, Meyaneh =

Qezel Bolagh قزل بلاغ
- Village
- Location within Iran
- Coordinates: 37°20′52″N 47°51′30″E
- Country: Iran
- Province: East Azerbaijan
- County: Meyaneh
- Bakhsh: Kaghazkonan
- Rural District: Qaflankuh-e Sharqi

Population (2006)
  - Total: 70
- Time zone: UTC+3:30 (IRST)
  - Summer (DST): UTC+4:30 (IRDT)

Qezel Bolagh (Persian: قزل بلاغ, also Romanized as Qezel Bolāgh) is a village in Qaflankuh-e Sharqi Rural District, Kaghazkonan District, Meyaneh County, East Azerbaijan Province, Iran. At the 2006 census, its population was 70, in 20 families.
