= Aq Duz, Qazvin =

Aq Duz اق دوز
- Village
- Location within Iran
- Coordinates: 36°34′19″N 49°40′10″E
- Country: Iran
- Province: Qazvin
- County: Qazvin
- Bakhsh: Kuhin
- Rural District: Ilat-e Qaqazan-e Gharbi

Population (2006)
  - Total: 35
- Time zone: UTC+3:30 (IRST)
  - Summer (DST): UTC+4:30 (IRDT)

Aq Duz (Persian: اق دوز, also Romanized as Āq Dūz) is a village in Ilat-e Qaqazan-e Gharbi Rural District, Kuhin District, Qazvin County, Qazvin Province, Iran. At the 2006 census, its population was 35, in 9 families.
