= Incheh, Shahin Dezh =

Incheh اينچه
- Village
- Location within Iran
- Coordinates: 36°29′03″N 46°49′23″E
- Country: Iran
- Province: West Azerbaijan
- County: Shahin Dezh
- Bakhsh: Central
- Rural District: Safa Khaneh

Population (2006)
  - Total: 218
- Time zone: UTC+3:30 (IRST)
  - Summer (DST): UTC+4:30 (IRDT)

Incheh (Persian: اينچه, also Romanized as Īncheh) is a village in Safa Khaneh Rural District, in the Central District of Shahin Dezh County, West Azerbaijan Province, Iran. At the 2006 census, its population was 218, in 41 families.
