= Darvish Kandi =

Darvish Kandi درويش كندي
- Village
- Location within Iran
- Coordinates: 39°18′53″N 44°24′11″E
- Country: Iran
- Province: West Azerbaijan
- County: Maku
- Bakhsh: Central
- Rural District: Qaleh Darrehsi

Population (2006)
  - Total: 125
- Time zone: UTC+3:30 (IRST)
  - Summer (DST): UTC+4:30 (IRDT)

Darvish Kandi (Persian: درويش كندي, also Romanized as Darvīsh Kandī; also known as Mokhtār Kandī, Nāyebar Kandī, and Nāyeb Kandī) is a village in Qaleh Darrehsi Rural District, in the Central District of Maku County, West Azerbaijan Province, Iran. At the 2006 census, its population was 125, in 20 families.
