= Beyg Kandi, East Azerbaijan =

Beyg Kandi بيگ كندي
- Village
- Location within Iran
- Coordinates: 37°13′48″N 46°51′14″E
- Country: Iran
- Province: East Azerbaijan
- County: Hashtrud
- Bakhsh: Nazarkahrizi
- Rural District: Nazarkahrizi

Population (2006)
  - Total: 90
- Time zone: UTC+3:30 (IRST)
  - Summer (DST): UTC+4:30 (IRDT)

Beyg Kandi (Persian: بيگ كندي, also Romanized as Beyg Kandī) is a village in Nazarkahrizi Rural District, Nazarkahrizi District, Hashtrud County, East Azerbaijan Province, Iran. At the 2006 census, its population was 90, in 17 families.
