= Karan, West Azerbaijan =

Karan كران
- Village
- Location within Iran
- Coordinates: 36°41′51″N 46°41′28″E
- Country: Iran
- Province: West Azerbaijan
- County: Shahin Dezh
- Bakhsh: Central
- Rural District: Hulasu

Population (2006)
  - Total: 91
- Time zone: UTC+3:30 (IRST)
  - Summer (DST): UTC+4:30 (IRDT)

Karan (Persian: كران, also Romanized as Karān) is a village in Hulasu Rural District, located in the Central District of Shahin Dezh County, West Azerbaijan Province, Iran. According to the 2006 census, its population was 91, in 15 families.
