= Incheh-ye Nurollah =

Incheh-ye Nurollah اينچه نوراله
- Village
- Location within Iran
- Coordinates: 39°25′44″N 44°40′40″E
- Country: Iran
- Province: West Azerbaijan
- County: Maku
- Bakhsh: Central
- Rural District: Chaybasar-e Jonubi

Population (2006)
  - Total: 39
- Time zone: UTC+3:30 (IRST)
  - Summer (DST): UTC+4:30 (IRDT)

Incheh-ye Nurollah (Persian: اينچه نوراله, also Romanized as Īncheh-ye Nūrollah; also known as Īncheh-ye 'Olyā and Īnjeh-ye 'Olyā) is a village in Chaybasar-e Jonubi Rural District, in the Central District of Maku County, West Azerbaijan Province, Iran. At the 2006 census, its population was 39, in 7 families.
