= Anbarak, Hormozgan =

Anbarak انبارك
- Village
- Location within Iran
- Coordinates: 26°53′33″N 57°11′09″E
- Country: Iran
- Province: Hormozgan
- County: Minab
- Bakhsh: Senderk
- Rural District: Senderk

Population (2006)
  - Total: 49
- Time zone: UTC+3:30 (IRST)
  - Summer (DST): UTC+4:30 (IRDT)

Anbarak (Persian: انبارك, also Romanized as Ānbāraḵ; also known as Ānbārī) is a village in Senderk Rural District, Senderk District, Minab County, Hormozgan Province, Iran. At the 2006 census, its population was 49, in 11 families.
