= Incheh-ye Hajj Mohammad =

Incheh-ye Hajj Mohammad اينچه حاج محمد
- Village
- Location within Iran
- Coordinates: 39°26′00″N 44°40′44″E
- Country: Iran
- Province: West Azerbaijan
- County: Maku
- Bakhsh: Central
- Rural District: Chaybasar-e Jonubi

Population (2006)
  - Total: 34
- Time zone: UTC+3:30 (IRST)
  - Summer (DST): UTC+4:30 (IRDT)

Incheh-ye Hajj Mohammad (Persian: اينچه حاج محمد, also Romanized as Īncheh-ye Ḩājj Moḩammad; also known as ‘Abdolābād, Īncheh-ye Soflá, and Īnjeh-ye Soflá) is a village in Chaybasar-e Jonubi Rural District, in the Central District of Maku County, West Azerbaijan Province, Iran. At the 2006 census, its population was 34, in 8 families.
