= Avajiq-e Shomali Rural District =

Rural district in West Azerbaijan province, Iran

Avajiq-e Shomali Rural District Persian: دهستان آواجيق شمالي
- Rural District
- Location within Iran
- Coordinates: 39°21′N 44°11′E
- Country: Iran
- Province: West Azerbaijan
- County: Chaldoran
- District: Dashtak
- Established: 1987
- Capital: Avajiq

Population (2016)
  - Total: 2,975
- Time zone: UTC+3:30 (IRST)

Avajiq-e Shomali Rural District (Persian: دهستان آواجيق شمالي), (Note: Formerly Avajiq Rural District (دهستان آواجيق)) is in Dashtak District of Chaldoran County, West Azerbaijan province, Iran. It is administered from the city of Avajiq. (Note: Formerly the village of Kelisa Kandi)

== Demographics ==
=== Population ===
At the time of the 2006 National Census, the rural district's population was 2,877 in 625 households. There were 3,699 inhabitants in 1,041 households at the following census of 2011. The 2016 census measured the population of the rural district as 2,975 in 847 households. The most populous of its 32 villages was Arab Dizaji, with 629 people.

=== Other villages in the rural district ===
- Aghbolagh-e Kalisa Kandi
- Baduli
- Beyg Kandi
- Qezel Bolagh
- Sari Ojaq
