= Avajiq-e Jonubi Rural District =

Rural district in West Azerbaijan province, Iran

Avajiq-e Jonubi Rural District Persian: دهستان آواجيق جنوبي
- Rural District
- Location within Iran
- Coordinates: 39°15′N 44°14′E
- Country: Iran
- Province: West Azerbaijan
- County: Chaldoran
- District: Dashtak
- Established: 1997
- Capital: Shadluy-e Sofla

Population (2016)
  - Total: 2,932
- Time zone: UTC+3:30 (IRST)

Avajiq-e Jonubi Rural District (Persian: دهستان آواجيق جنوبي) is in Dashtak District of Chaldoran County, West Azerbaijan province, Iran. Its capital is the village of Shadluy-e Sofla.

== Demographics ==
=== Population ===
At the time of the 2006 National Census, the rural district's population was 4,543 in 883 households. There were 3,364 inhabitants in 852 households at the following census of 2011. The 2016 census measured the population of the rural district as 2,932 in 817 households. The most populous of its 33 villages was Shadluy-e Sofla, with 310 people.

=== Other villages in the rural district ===
- Delakverdi
- Gol Sefid
- Oruj Kandi
- Qaleh Khach
- Qezel Suri
- Qoli Dizaji
