= Baba Jik Rural District =

Rural district in West Azerbaijan province, Iran

Baba Jik Rural District Persian: دهستان ببه جيك
- Rural District
- Location within Iran
- Coordinates: 39°03′N 44°39′E
- Country: Iran
- Province: West Azerbaijan
- County: Chaldoran
- District: Central
- Established: 1987
- Capital: Qaranqu

Population (2016)
  - Total: 2,947
- Time zone: UTC+3:30 (IRST)

Baba Jik Rural District (Persian: دهستان ببه جيك) is in the Central District of Chaldoran County, West Azerbaijan province, Iran. Its capital is the village of Qaranqu.

== Demographics ==
=== Population ===
At the time of the 2006 National Census, the rural district's population was 4,293 in 838 households. There were 3,597 inhabitants in 1,037 households at the following census of 2011. The 2016 census measured the population of the rural district as 2,947 in 938 households. The most populous of its 43 villages was Qaranqu, with 473 people.

=== Other villages in the rural district ===
- Mirabad
- Qerkh Bolagh
- Qusha Bolagh-e Olya
- Yumoridash
