= Chaldoran-e Jonubi Rural District =

Rural district in West Azerbaijan province, Iran

Chaldoran-e Jonubi Rural District Persian: دهستان چالدران جنوبي
- Rural District
- Location within Iran
- Coordinates: 38°56′N 44°22′E
- Country: Iran
- Province: West Azerbaijan
- County: Chaldoran
- District: Central
- Established: 1987
- Capital: Khezerlu

Population (2016)
  - Total: 9,661
- Time zone: UTC+3:30 (IRST)

Chaldoran-e Jonubi Rural District (Persian: دهستان چالدران جنوبي) is in the Central District of Chaldoran County, West Azerbaijan province, Iran. Its capital is the village of Khezerlu.

== Demographics ==
=== Population ===
At the time of the 2006 National Census, the rural district's population was 9,735 in 1,756 households. There were 10,663 inhabitants in 2,368 households at the following census of 2011. The 2016 census measured the population of the rural district as 9,661 in 2,320 households. The most populous of its 65 villages was Mokhur, with 1,225 people.

=== Other villages in the rural district ===
- Isa Golik
- Kord Kandi
- Malhamlu-ye Olya
- Qarahjah Veran-e Sofla
- Segrik
- Sheykh Saluy-e Sofla
