= Chaldoran-e Shomali Rural District =

Rural district in West Azerbaijan province, Iran

Chaldoran-e Shomali Rural District Persian: دهستان چالدران شمالي
- Rural District
- Location within Iran
- Coordinates: 39°07′N 44°22′E
- Country: Iran
- Province: West Azerbaijan
- County: Chaldoran
- District: Central
- Established: 1987
- Capital: Zaviyeh-ye Sofla

Population (2016)
  - Total: 7,075
- Time zone: UTC+3:30 (IRST)

Chaldoran-e Shomali Rural District (Persian: دهستان چالدران شمالي) is in the Central District of Chaldoran County, West Azerbaijan province, Iran. Its capital is the village of Zaviyeh-ye Sofla.

== Demographics ==
=== Population ===
At the time of the 2006 National Census, the rural district's population was 7,286 in 1,503 households. There were 7,773 inhabitants in 1,952 households at the following census of 2011. The 2016 census measured the population of the rural district as 7,075 in 1,951 households. The most populous of its 56 villages was Sadal, with 1,092 people.

=== Other villages in the rural district ===
- Aqduz
- Babalu
- Chokhur Kand
- Gal Ashaqi
- Incheh-ye Olya
- Takht-e Ravan-e Olya
- Tazeh Kand
