= Dashtak District =

District in West Azerbaijan province, Iran

Dashtak District Persian: بخش دشتک
- District
- Interactive map of Dashtak District
- Location within Iran
- Coordinates: 39°18′N 44°12′E
- Country: Iran
- Province: West Azerbaijan
- County: Chaldoran
- Established: 1997
- Capital: Avajiq

Population (2016)
  - Total: 7,570
- Time zone: UTC+3:30 (IRST)

Dashtak District (Persian: بخش دشتک) is in Chaldoran County, West Azerbaijan province, Iran. Its capital is the city of Avajiq. (Note: Formerly the village of Kelisa Kandi)

== Demographics ==
=== Population ===
At the time of the 2006 National Census, the district's population was 9,069 in 1,885 households. The following census in 2011 counted 8,579 people in 2,312 households. The 2016 census measured the population of the district as 7,570 inhabitants in 2,150 households.

=== Administrative divisions ===
Dashtak District Population
Administrative Divisions	2006	2011	2016
Avajiq-e Jonubi RD	4,543	3,364	2,932
Avajiq-e Shomali RD (Note: Formerly Avajiq Rural District)	2,877	3,699	2,975
Avajiq (city)	1,649	1,516	1,663
Total	9,069	8,579	7,570
RD = Rural District
