= Central District (Chaldoran County) =

District in West Azerbaijan province, Iran

Central District (Chaldoran County) Persian: بخش مرکزی شهرستان چالدران
- District
- Location within Iran
- Coordinates: 39°01′N 44°29′E
- Country: Iran
- Province: West Azerbaijan
- County: Chaldoran
- Established: 1997
- Capital: Siah Cheshmeh

Population (2016)
  - Total: 37,487
- Time zone: UTC+3:30 (IRST)

The Central District of Chaldoran County (Persian: بخش مرکزی شهرستان چالدران) is in West Azerbaijan province, Iran. Its capital is the city of Siah Cheshmeh.

== Demographics ==
=== Population ===
At the time of the 2006 National Census, the district's population was 35,503 in 7,121 households. The following census in 2011 counted 37,819 people in 9,090 households. The 2016 census measured the population of the district as 37,487 inhabitants in 9,817 households.

=== Administrative divisions ===
Central District (Chaldoran County) Population
Administrative Divisions	2006	2011	2016
Baba Jik RD	4,293	3,597	2,947
Chaldoran-e Jonubi RD	9,735	10,663	9,661
Chaldoran-e Shomali RD	7,286	7,773	7,075
Siah Cheshmeh (city)	14,189	15,786	17,804
Total	35,503	37,819	37,487
RD = Rural District
