= Chaldoran County =

County in West Azerbaijan province, Iran

Chaldoran County Persian: شهرستان چالدران
- County
- Location of Chaldoran County in West Azerbaijan province (top, green)

- Location of West Azerbaijan province in Iran
- Interactive map of Chaldoran County
- Coordinates: 39°07′N 44°28′E
- Country: Iran
- Province: West Azerbaijan
- Established: 1997
- Capital: Siah Cheshmeh
- Districts: Central, Dashtak

Population (2016)
  - Total: 45,060
- Time zone: UTC+3:30 (IRST)

Chaldoran County (Persian: شهرستان چالدران) is in West Azerbaijan province, Iran. Its capital is the city of Siah Cheshmeh (سيه چشمه), also known as Qara Aineh.

== History ==
Chaldoran is the site of the historic Battle of Chaldiran, which took place in 1514 between the armies of Ottoman Sultan Selim I and Safavid Shah Ismail I on the narrow plain outside of the town. The Ottoman army had the advantage of using firearms as well as superiority in size, and defeated the Safavid army for the first time.

After the Ottomans took this area, they resettled many of the Kurdish tribes further west.

Holy Tatavous Church (Ghare Kelisa) or St. Thaddeus's is in Chaldoran district, 7 km north east of the town of Seyah Cheshmah.

== Demographics ==
=== Population ===
At the time of the 2006 National Census, the county's population was 143,205 in 31,291 households. The following census in 2011 counted 46,398 people in 11,364 households. The 2016 census measured the population of the county as 45,060 in 11,970 households.

=== Administrative divisions ===
Chaldoran County's population history and administrative structure over three consecutive censuses are shown in the following table.

Chaldoran County Population
Administrative Divisions	2006	2011	2016
Central District	35,503	37,819	37,487
Baba Jik RD	4,293	3,597	2,947
Chaldoran-e Jonubi RD	9,735	10,663	9,661
Chaldoran-e Shomali RD	7,286	7,773	7,075
Siah Cheshmeh (city)	14,189	15,786	17,804
Dashtak District	9,069	8,579	7,570
Avajiq-e Jonubi RD	4,543	3,364	2,932
Avajiq-e Shomali RD (Note: Formerly Avajiq Rural District)	2,877	3,699	2,975
Avajiq (city) (Note: Formerly the village of Kelisa Kandi)	1,649	1,516	1,663
Total	44,572	46,398	45,060
RD = Rural District

== Climate ==
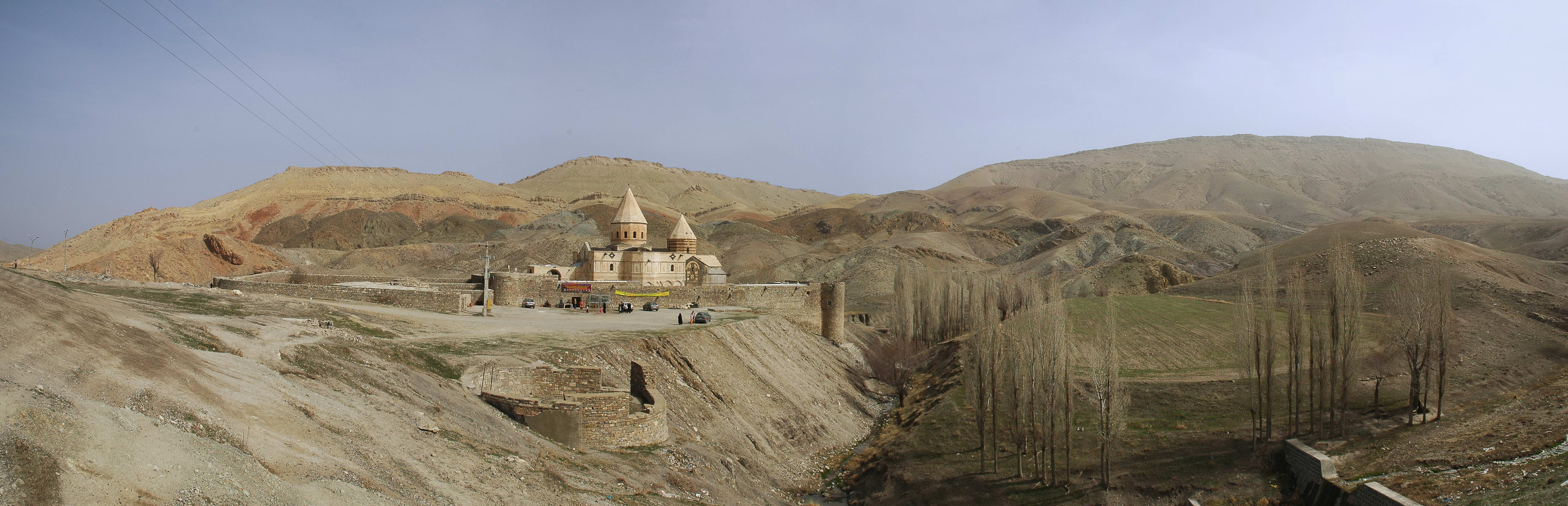
A panorama of the site of Saint Thaddeus Monastery

Chaldoran is one of the tourist areas of West Azerbaijan because of its cold weather in winter and cool summer.

== Economy ==
The expansion of pastures and cultivable lands has given this region the opportunity of enjoying prosperous cattle breeding, agriculture and apiculture with highest rate of job creation in the region. According to the census of the year 2003, population of Chaldoran district is 46,700; 33.5 percent of whom live in urban areas and 66.5 percent are rural and tribal settlers. Chaldoran's Wednesday Market (Chaharshanbeh Bazar) enjoys a particular fame for various types of cattle, agricultural, farming products and local handicrafts. The most important tourism attractions of this city are : Holy Tatavous Church (Ghareh Kelisa), Tomb of shahid sedreddin shirazi, Tombs of Martyrs in chaldoran City and Zarzar Church in Baroum Village

== See also ==
Media related to Chaldoran County at Wikimedia Commons
