= Monastery of Saint Thaddeus =

Former Armenian monastery in Iran

Monastery of Saint Thaddeus Սուրբ Թադեոս վանք
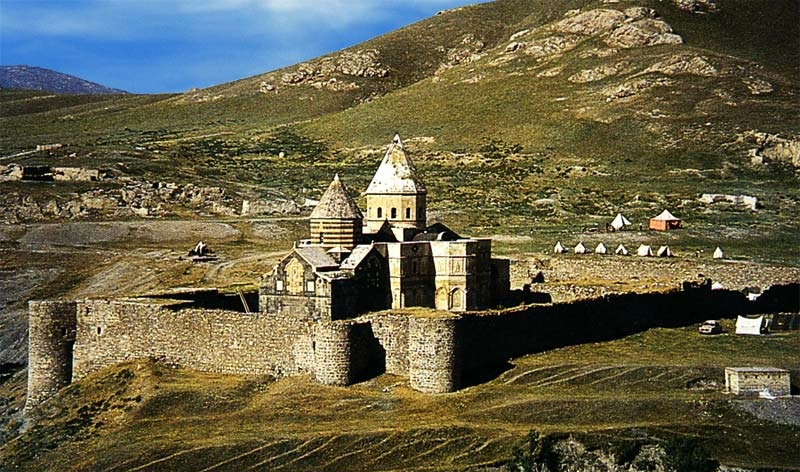
- Saint Thaddeus Monastery, northwestern view

- Location within Iran
- 39°05′32″N 44°32′40″E
- Location: Qareh Kelisa, Chaldoran County, Iran

UNESCO World Heritage Site
- Official name: Monastery of Saint Thaddeus
- Type: Cultural
- Criteria: ii, iii, vi
- Designated: 2011 (32ND session)
- Reference no.
- Region: Asia-Pacific

Iran National Heritage List
- Official name: Monastery of Saint Thaddeus
- Type: Christian Monastery
- Designated: 1956
- Reference no.: 405
- Conservation organization: Cultural Heritage, Handicrafts and Tourism Organization of Iran

The Monastery of Saint Thaddeus (Armenian: Սուրբ Թադէոսի վանք, Surb Tadeosi vank; Persian: کلیسای تادئوس مقدس, Kelisā-ye Tādeus moghadas) is an Armenian monastery in a mountainous area of West Azerbaijan province, Iran. Although much of the present structure was erected by Crown Prince Abbas Mirza in 1811, the monastery is one of the oldest church buildings in the world.

Also known as Kare Kilisa (lit. 'Stone made Church'), this historic site is located approximately 20 kilometers from the town of Chaldiran in Iran, in the region historically referred to as Ancient Armenia in the East. The monastery and its distinctive Armenian conical roofs are visible from long distances.

The monastery is the site of the Pilgrimage of St. Thaddeus, which in 2020 was added by UNESCO to its list of Intangible Cultural Heritage.

== History and architecture ==
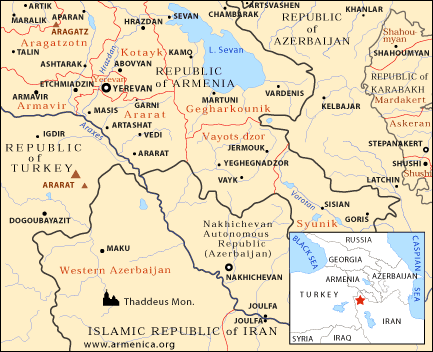
Regional map showing the location of the Monastery of Saint Thaddeus

According to the tradition of the Armenian Apostolic Church, Saint Thaddeus, also known as Saint Jude, evangelized the regions of Armenia and Persia. According to Moses of Khorenatsi, an Armenian historian writing in the 5th century, Thaddeus suffered martyrdom in Armenia under King Sanatruk, and is revered as an apostle of the Armenian Church. Legend holds that a church dedicated to him was first built on the present site—also said to be his burial place—in AD 66, with another source placing the foundation in AD 239 under St. Gregory the Illuminator. Another tradition states that Thaddeus built a monastery at the site for his followers, who buried him there upon his death. The exact date of construction is unknown.

The monastery was damaged in 1231, during the Mongol invasions of Armenia and the Persian Empire, and again in 1242.

Little remains of the monastery's original structure, as it was extensively rebuilt after an earthquake damaged it in 1319, during which 75 monks died. Nevertheless, parts surrounding the altar apse date from the 7th century.

Much of the present structure dates from 1811, when the Qajar crown prince, Abbas Mirza, aided renovations and repairs. Simeon, Father Superior of the monastery, added a large narthex-like real Armenian architecture, west extension to the church.

The west extension duplicates the design of Etchmiadzin Cathedral, the mother church of the Armenian Apostolic Church. The 19th century additions were constructed from ashlar Ashlar masonry stone. The earliest sections are black and white stone.

In July 2008, the Monastery of Saint Thaddeus was added to UNESCO's World Heritage List, along with two other Armenian monuments in the same province: the Monastery of Saint Stepanos and the Chapel of Dzordzor.

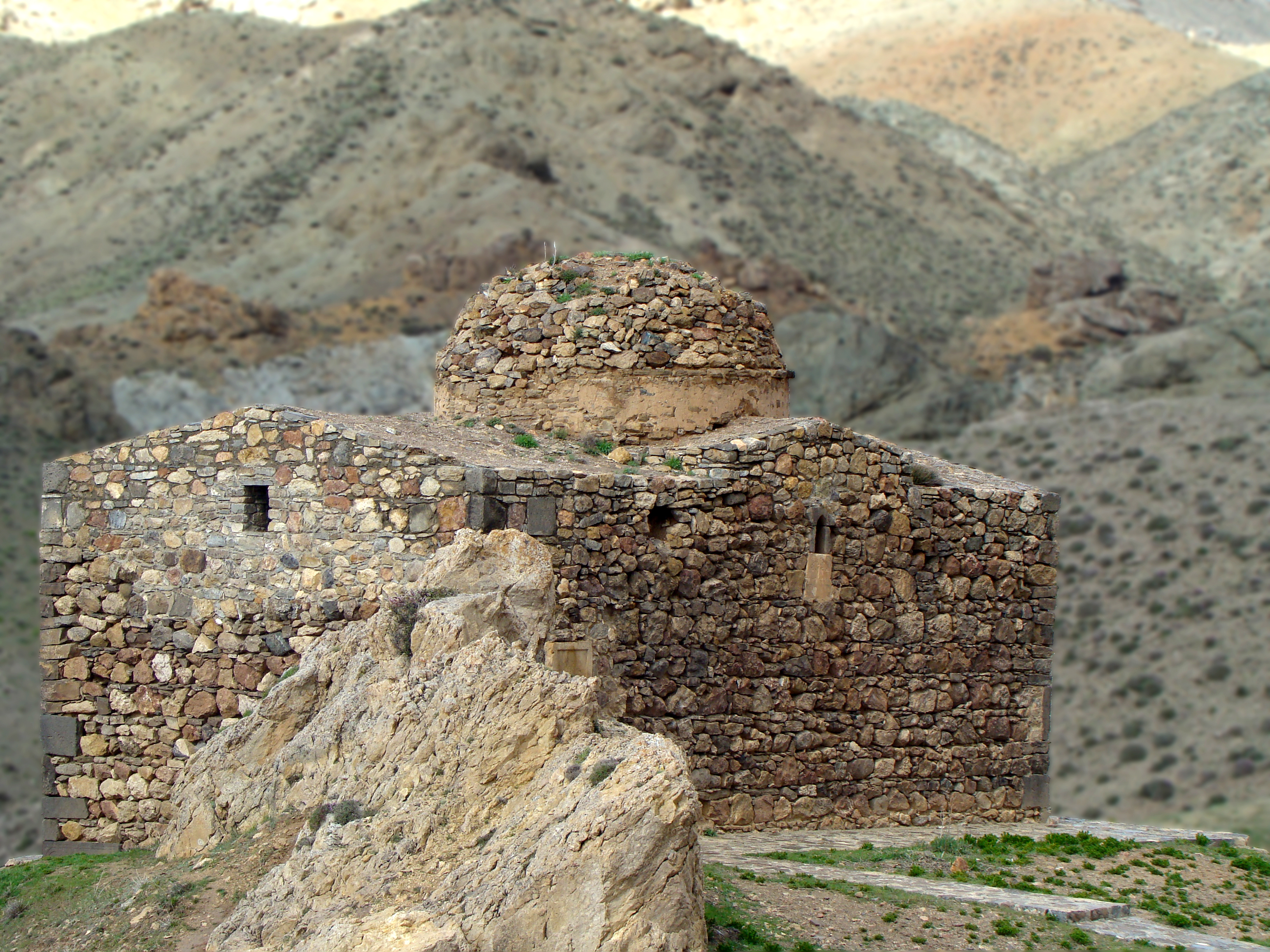
Chapel of Zachary, close to the monastery

== Notable details ==
=== Apostles Thaddeus and Bartholomew ===
According to Armenian Church tradition, the Apostles Thaddeus and Bartholomew traveled through Armenia in AD 45 to preach the word of God, where many people were converted and numerous secret Christian communities were established.

The ancient Christian historian Moses of Khorene told the following story, considered a legend by most modern historiographers. Thaddeus converted King Abgar V of Edessa. After his death, the Armenian kingdom was split into two parts. His son Ananun crowned himself in Edessa, while his nephew Sanatruk ruled in Armenia. About AD 66, Ananun gave the order to kill Saint Thaddeus in Edessa. The king's daughter Sandokht, who had converted to Christianity, was martyred with Thaddeus. Her tomb is said to be located near the monastery.

=== Events ===
The annual ceremony and pilgrimage in the St. Thaddeus Monastery was held 14–16 July 2016. It was held by the Armenian Diocese of Atrpatakan. In December 2020, UNESCO added the pilgrimage to its list of Intangible Cultural Heritage.

== Gallery ==
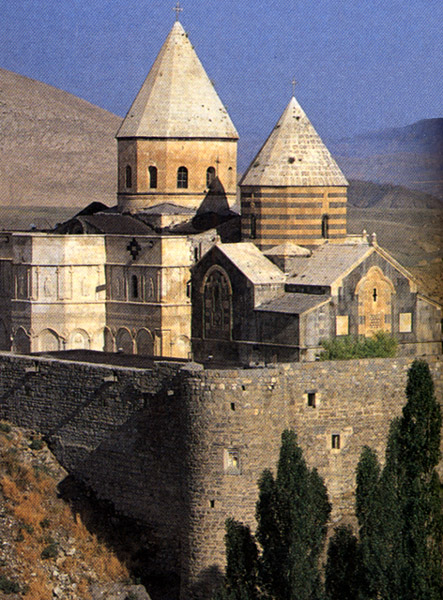
The compound

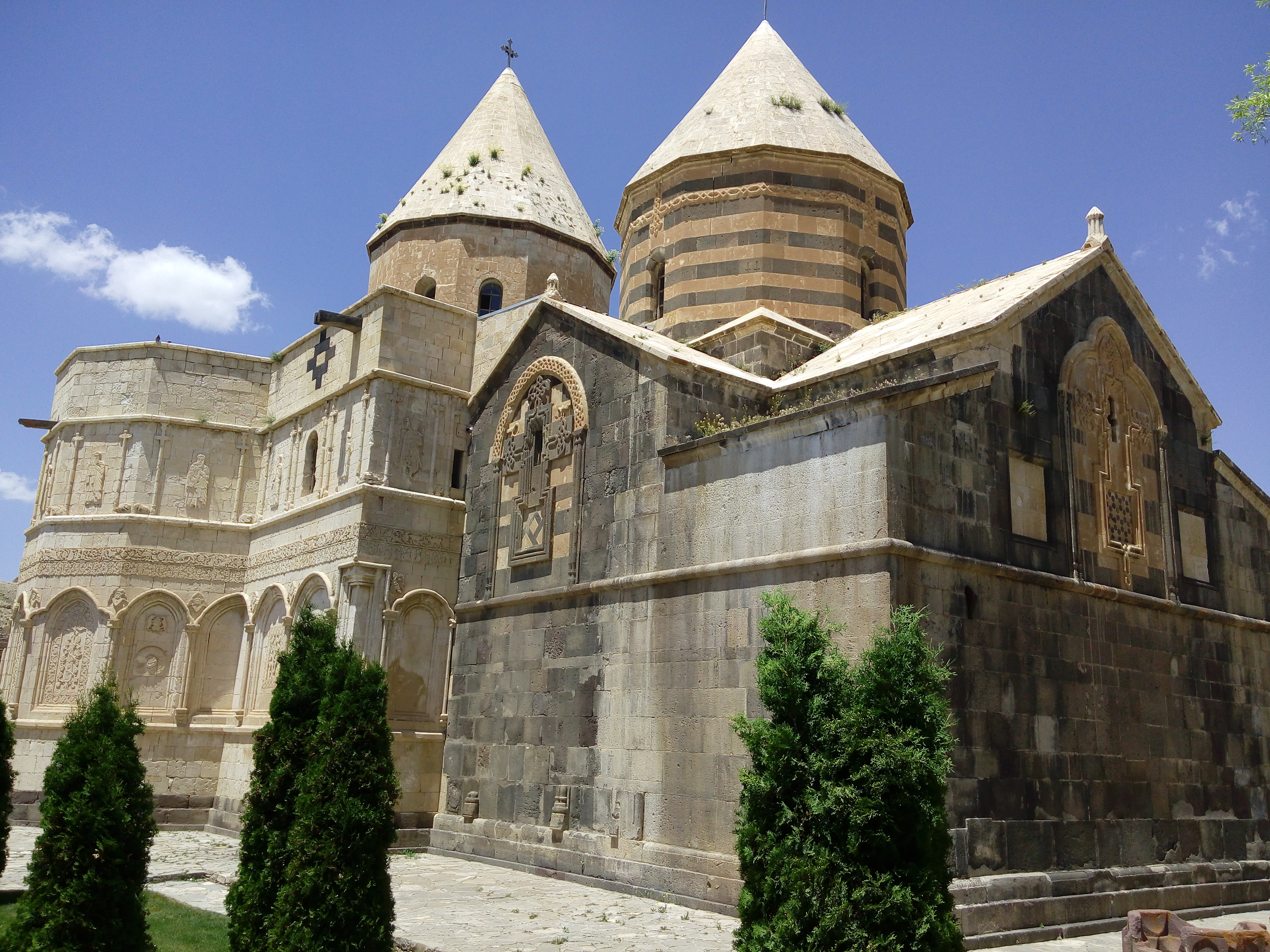

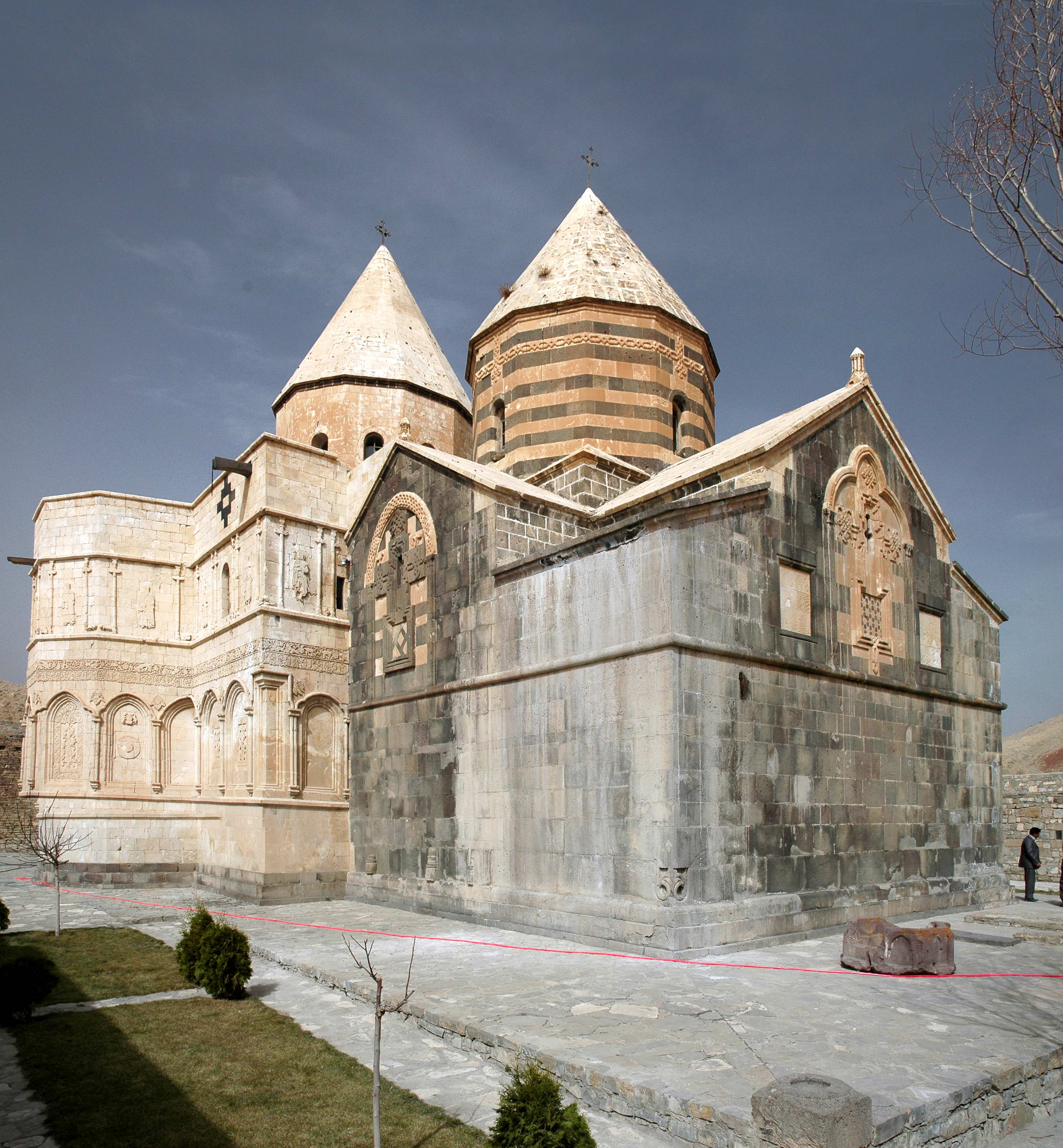
The monastery

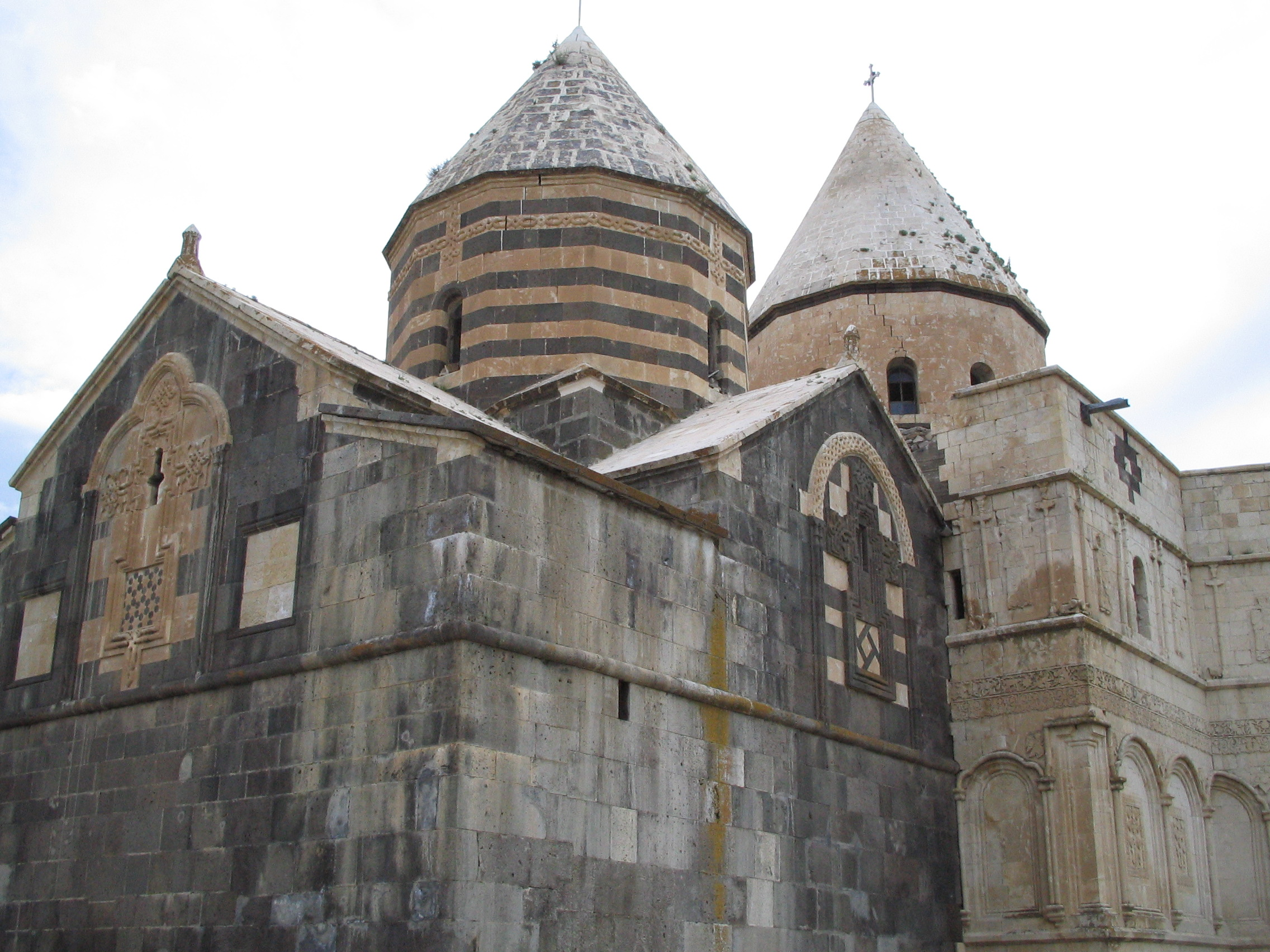
Another view of the monastery

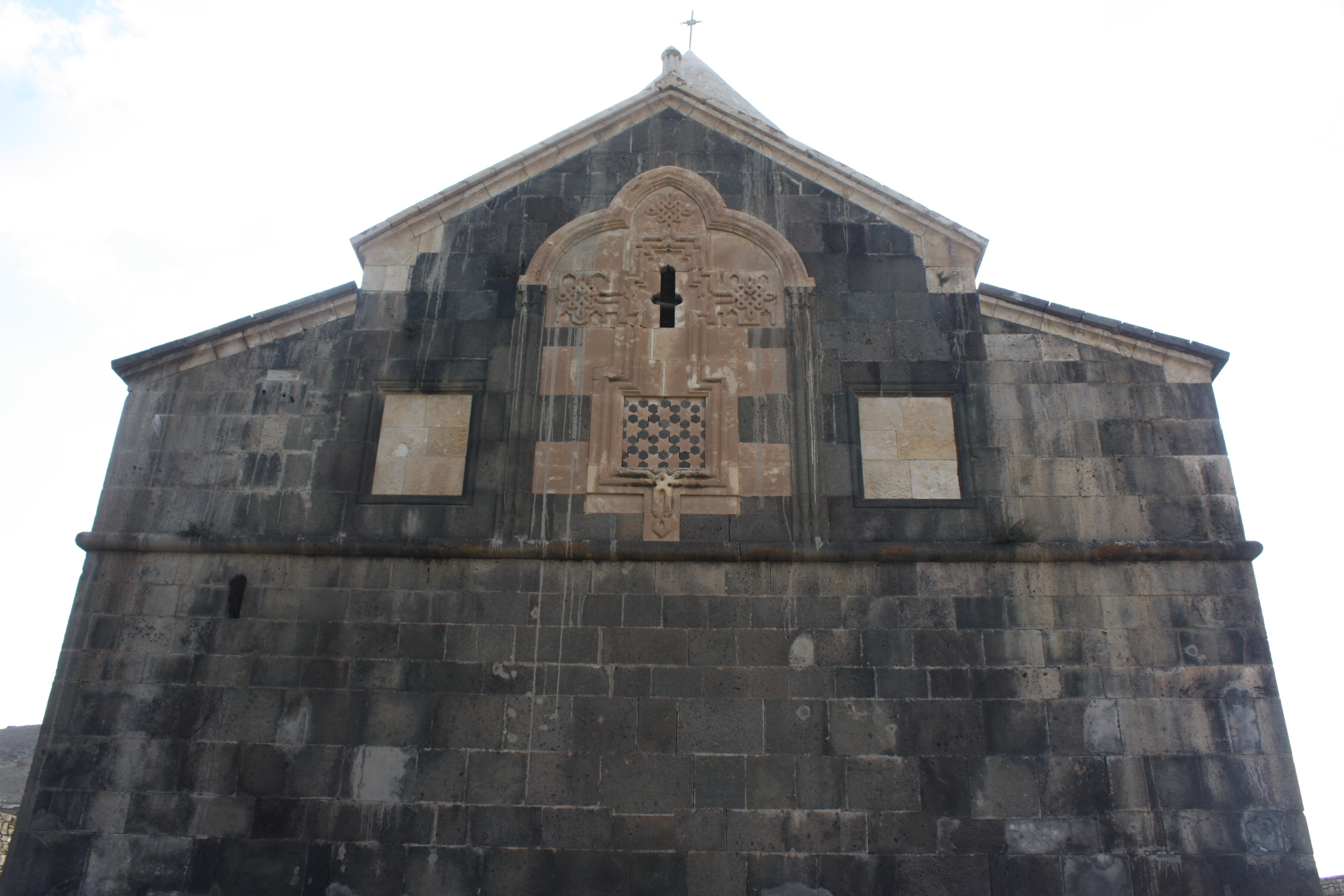

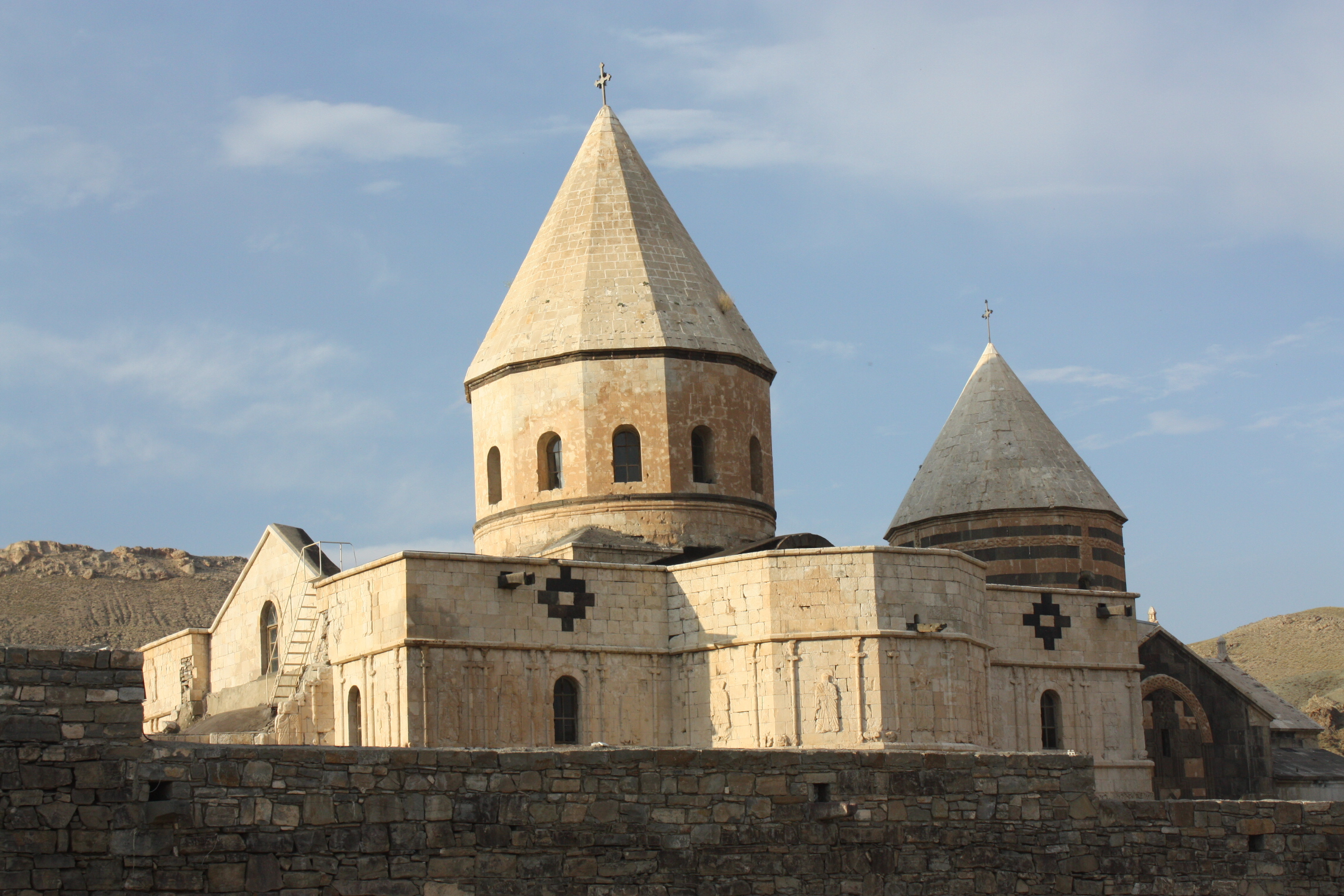

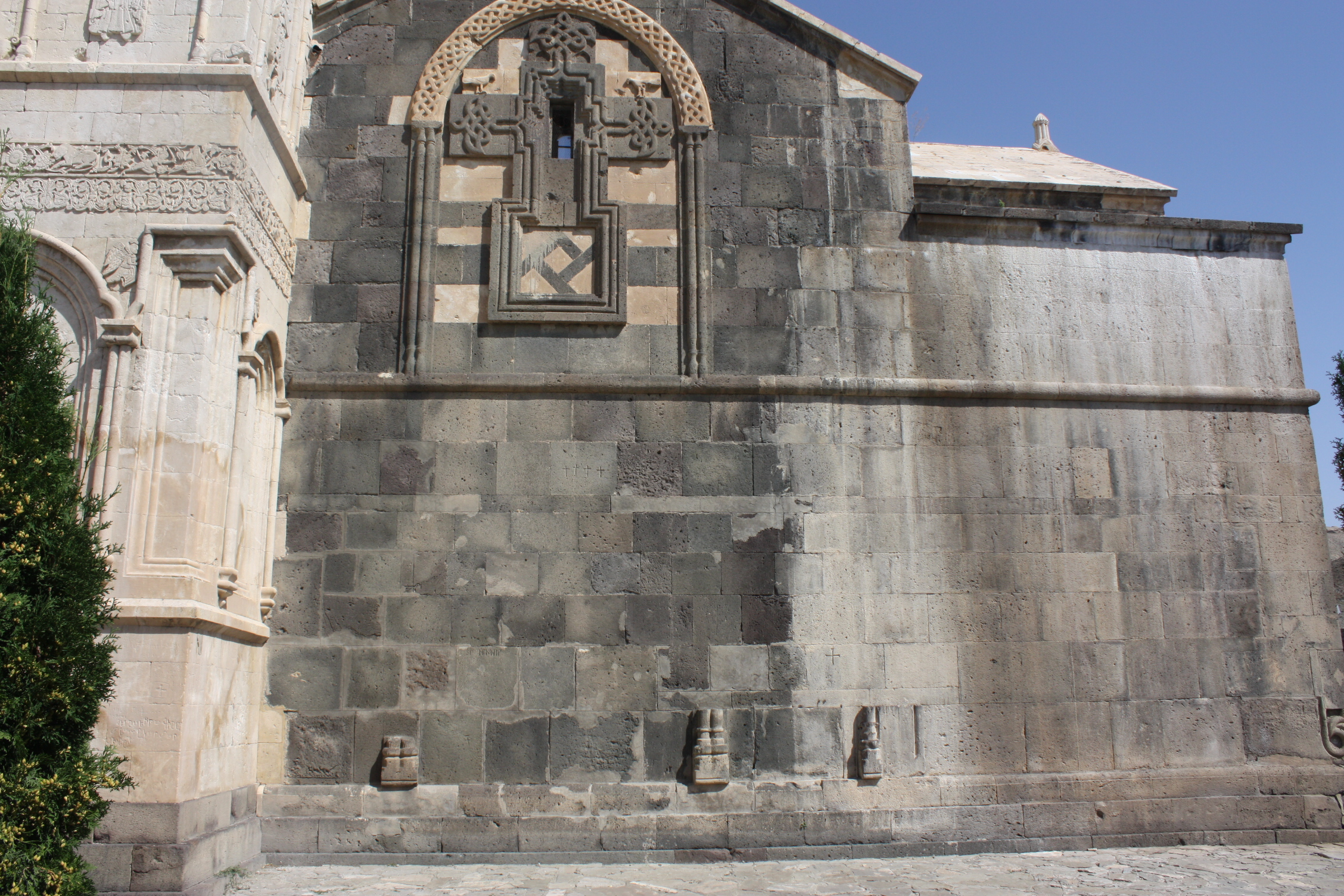

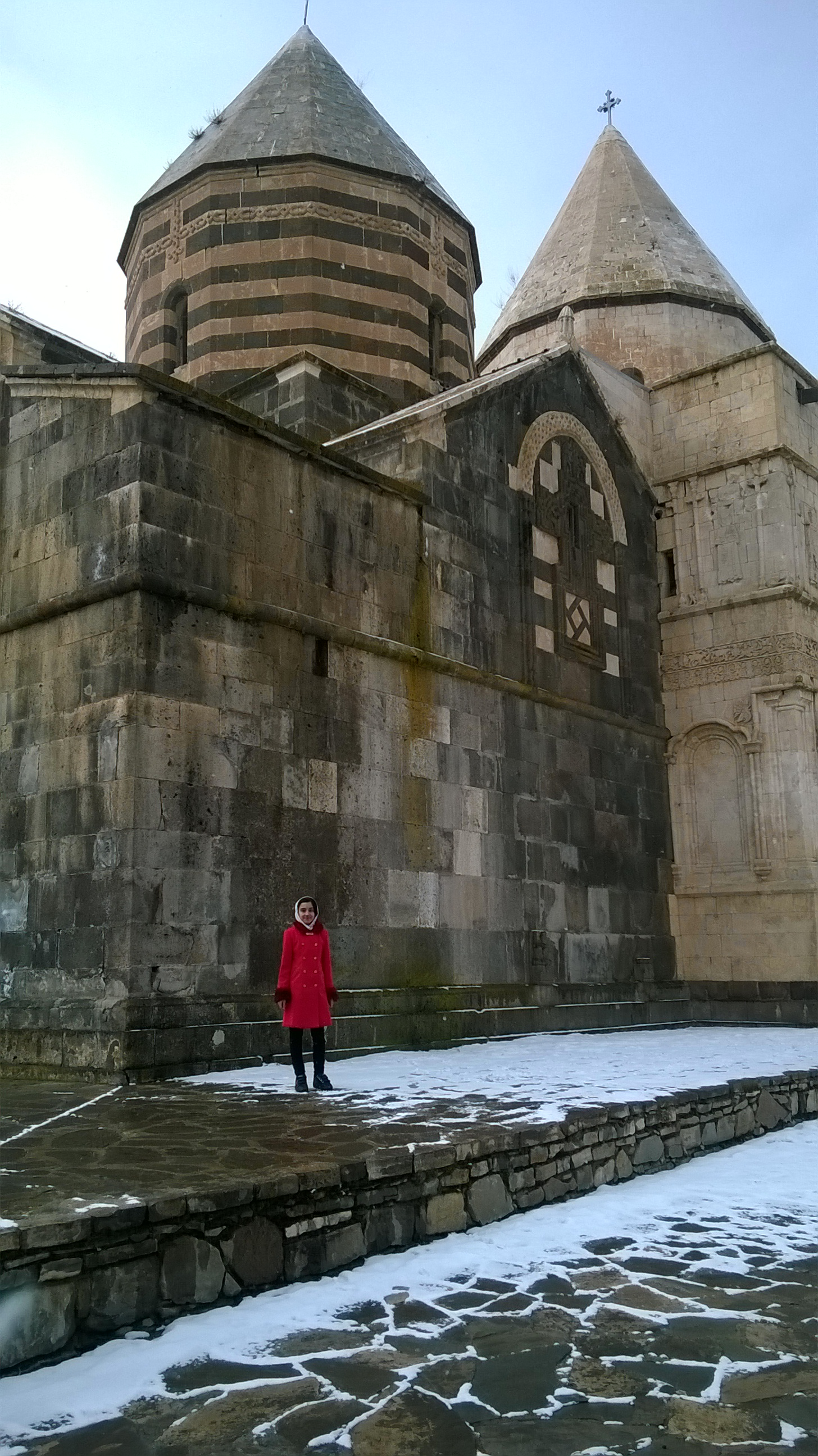

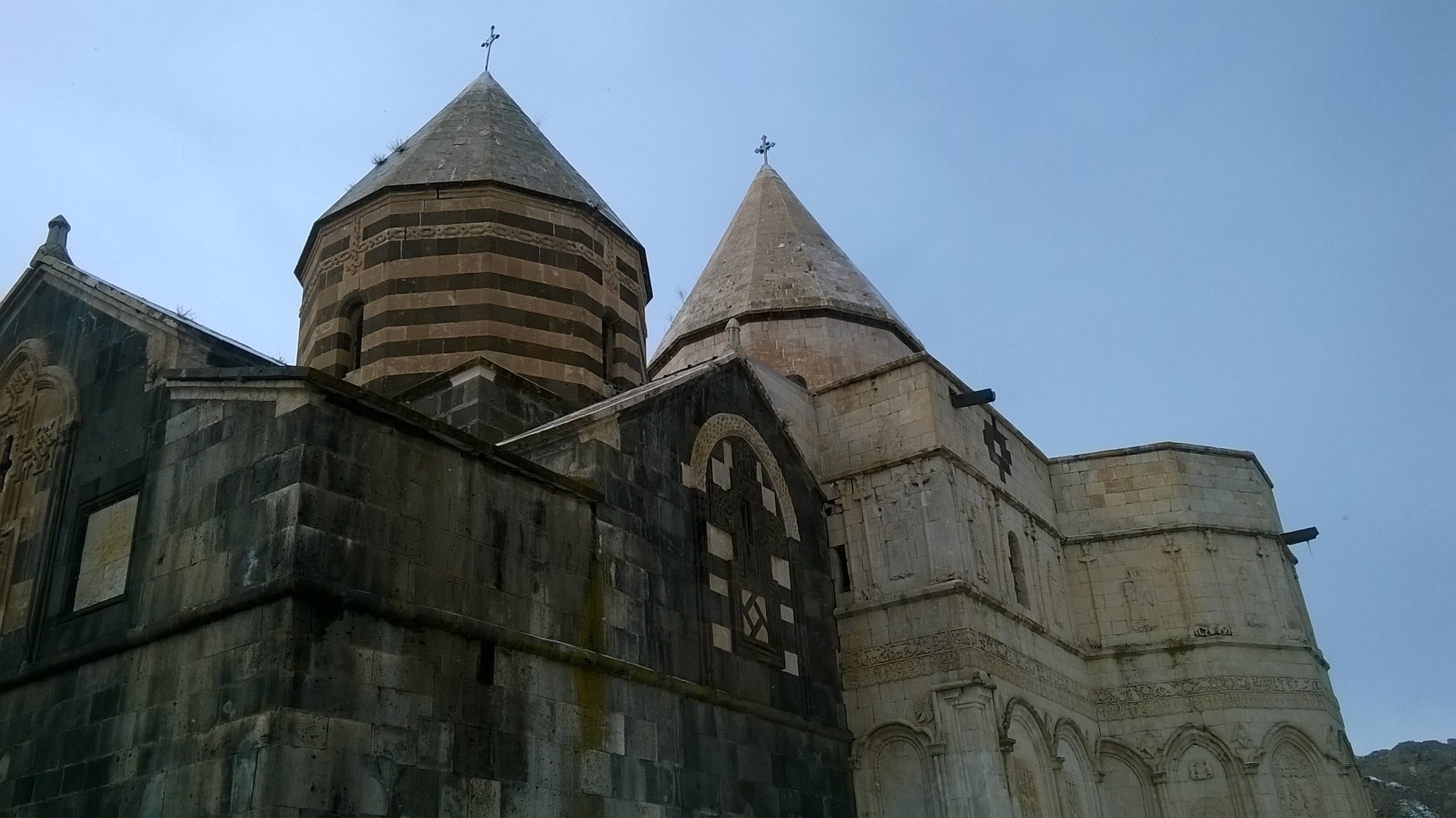

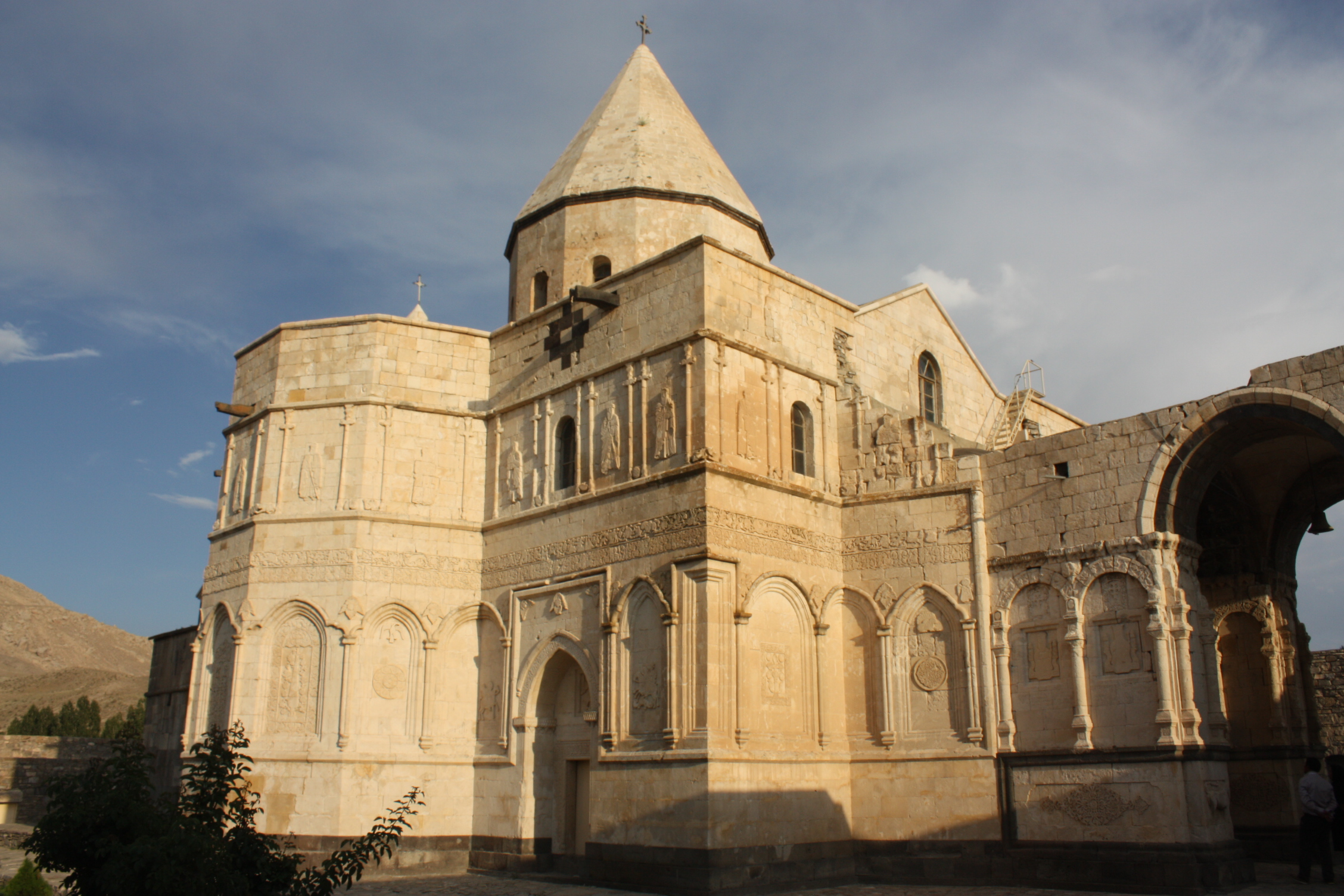

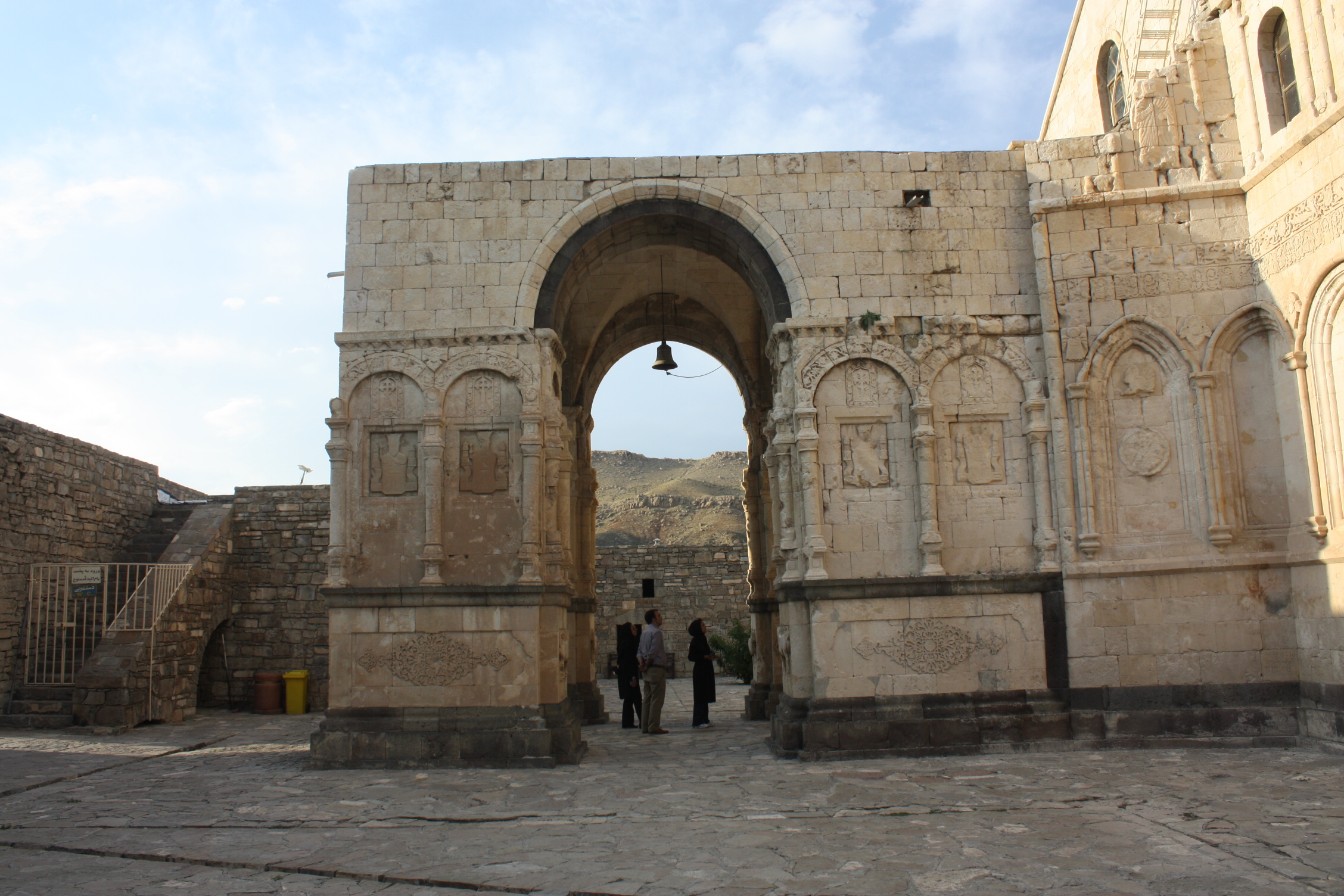

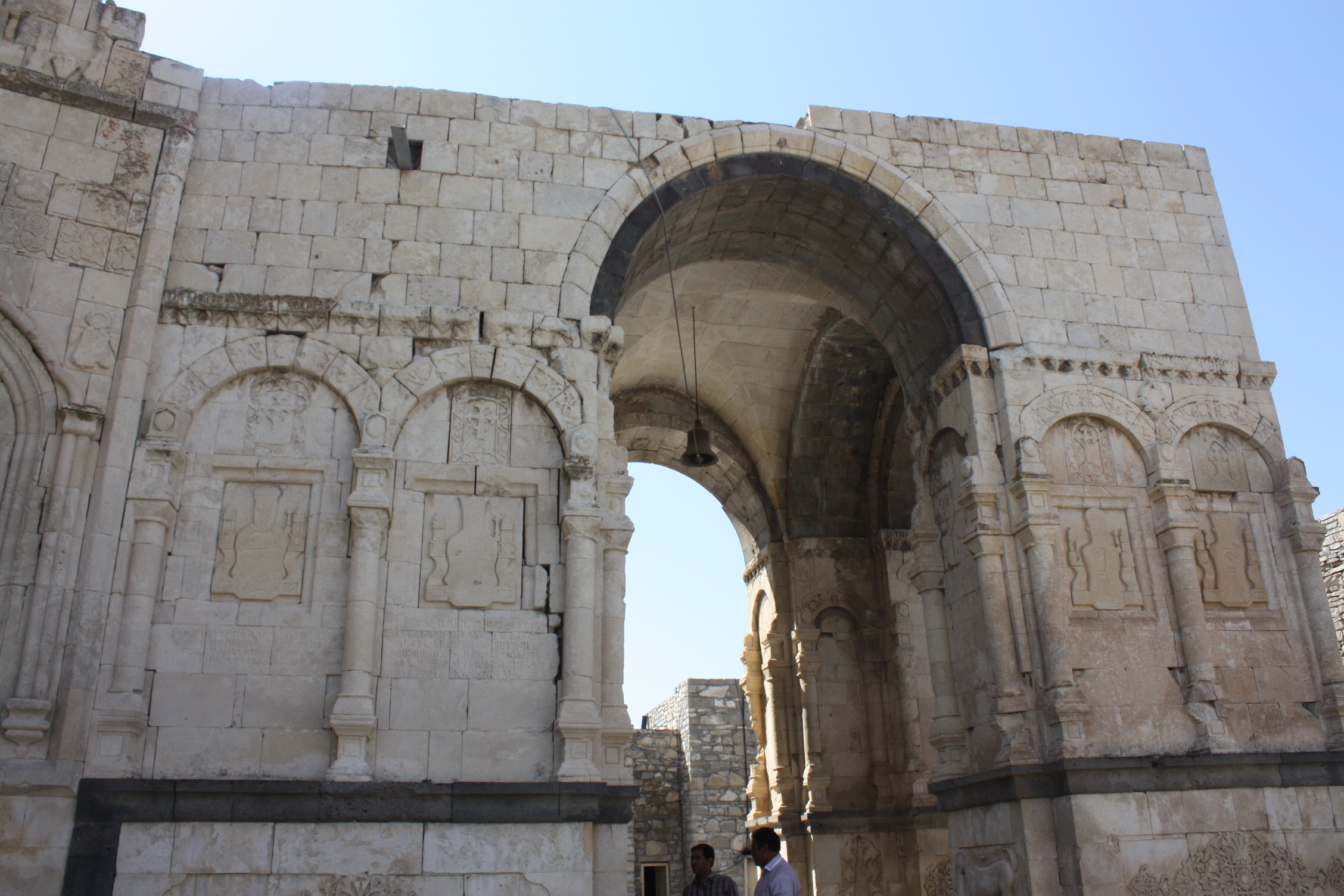

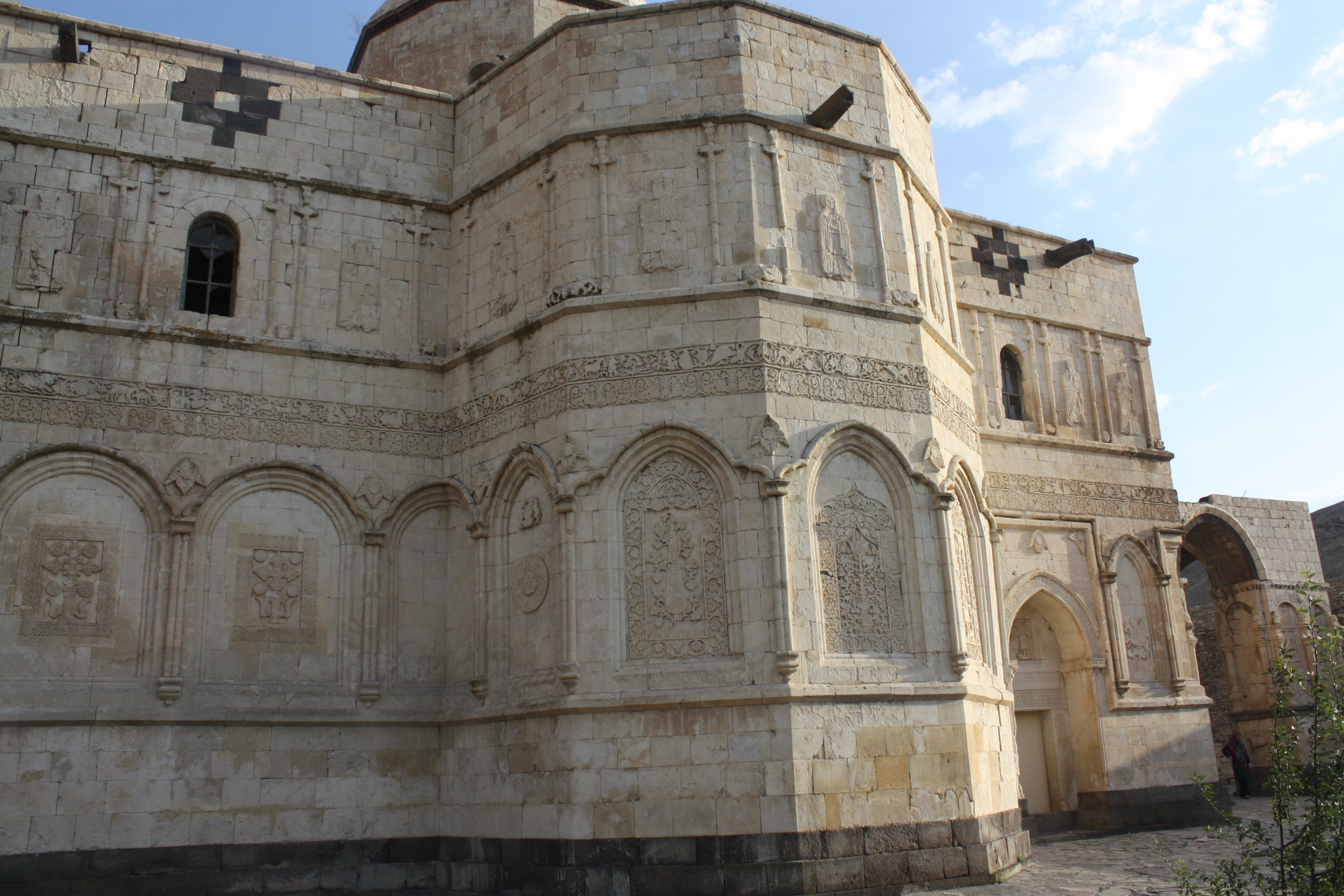

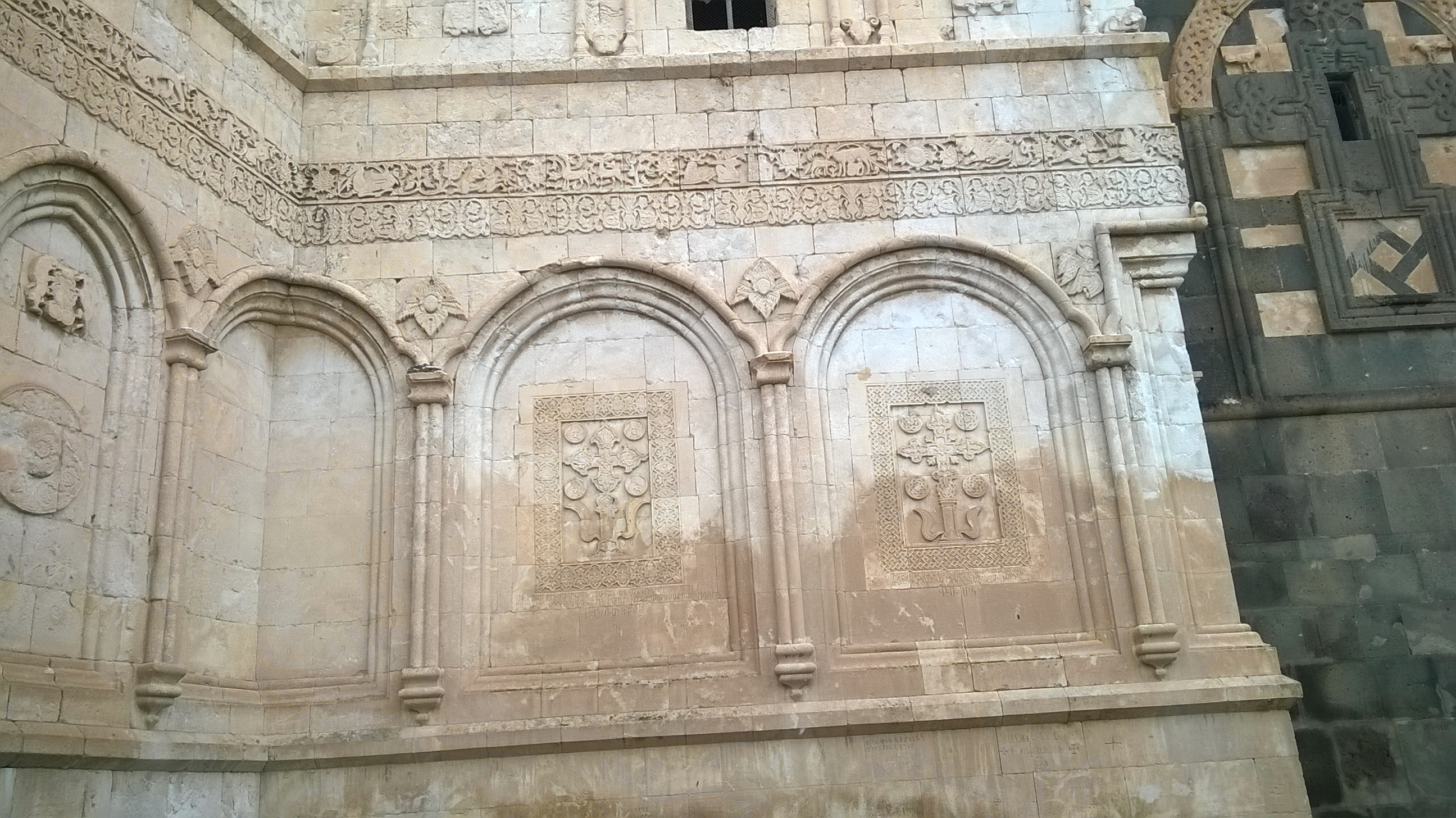

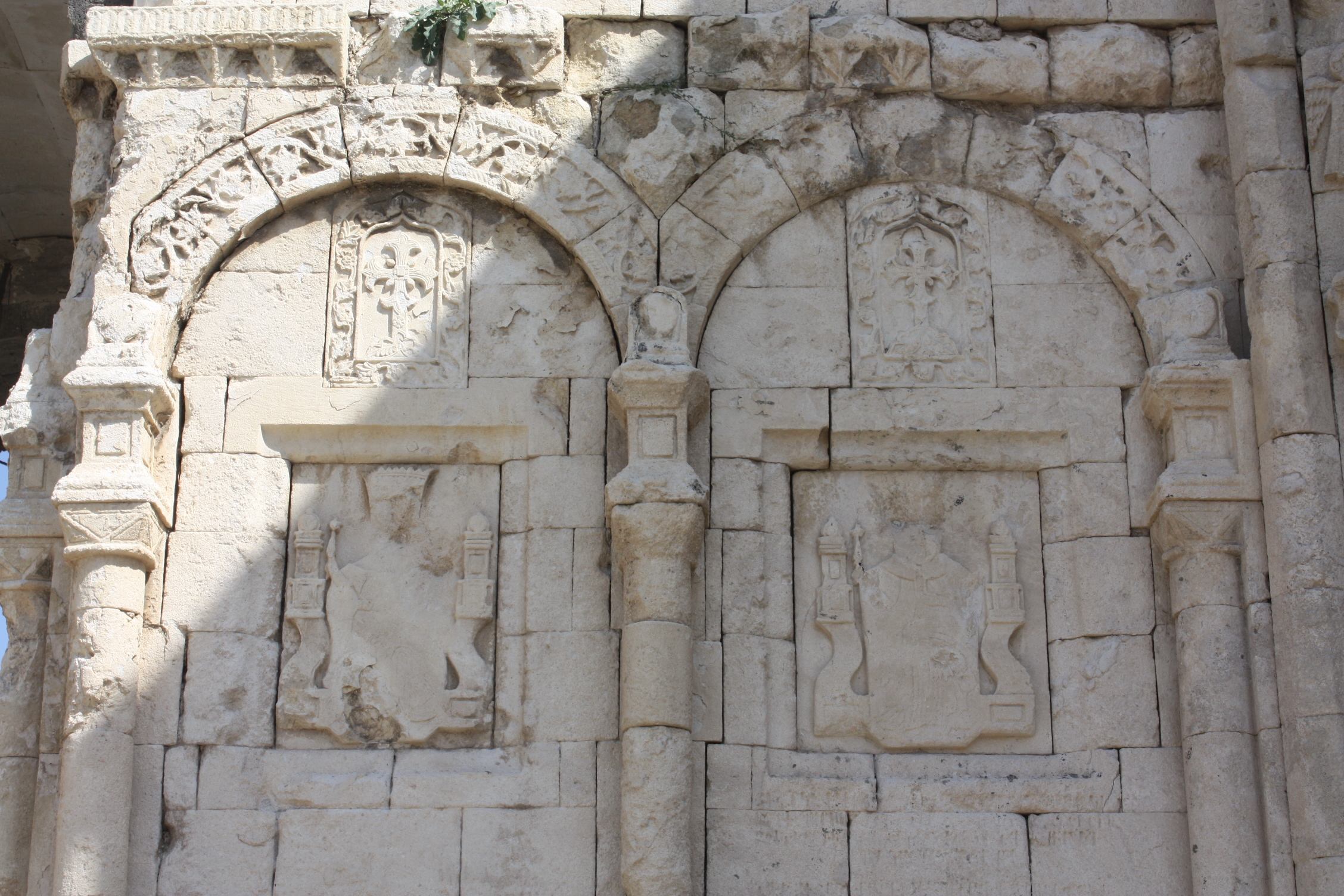

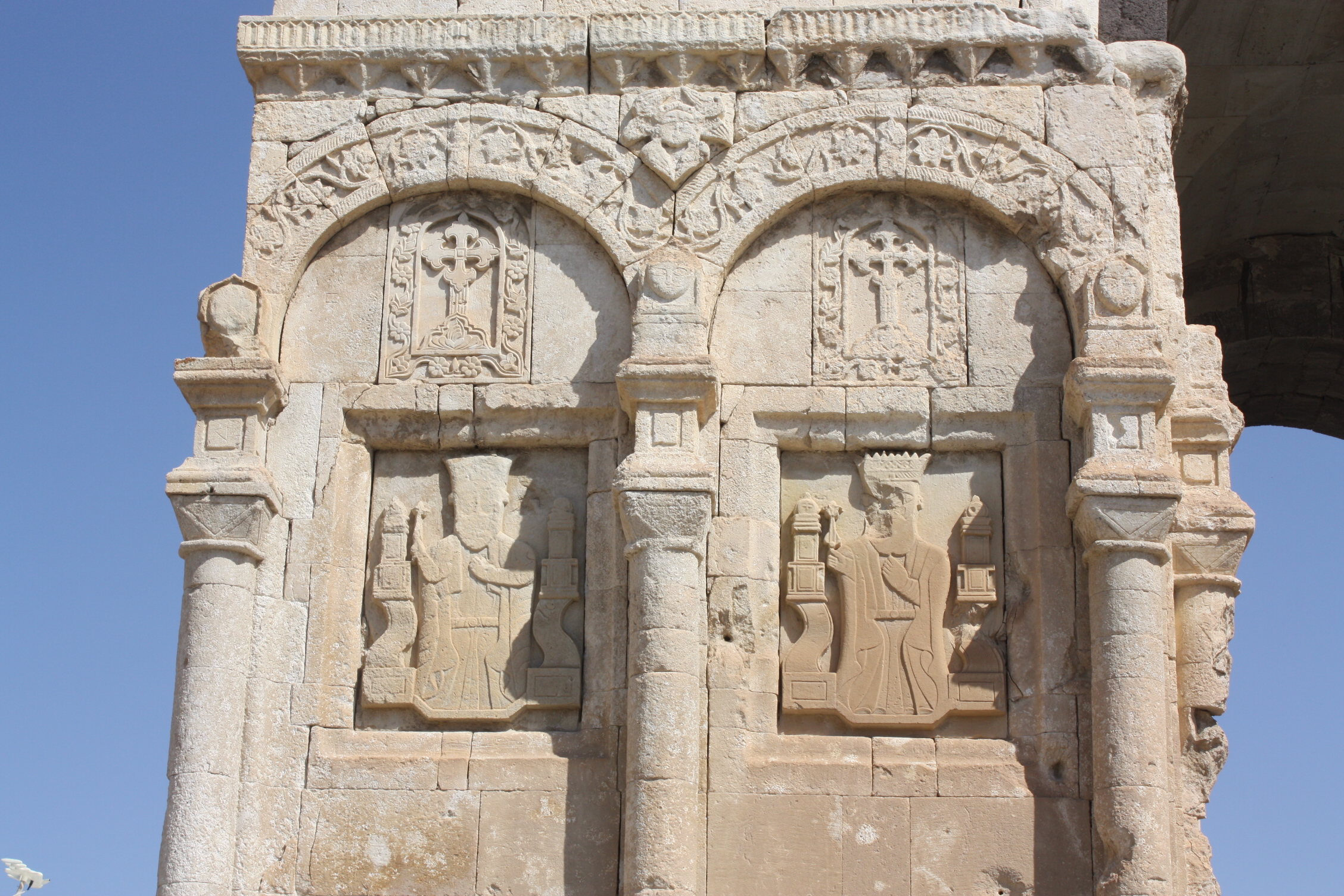

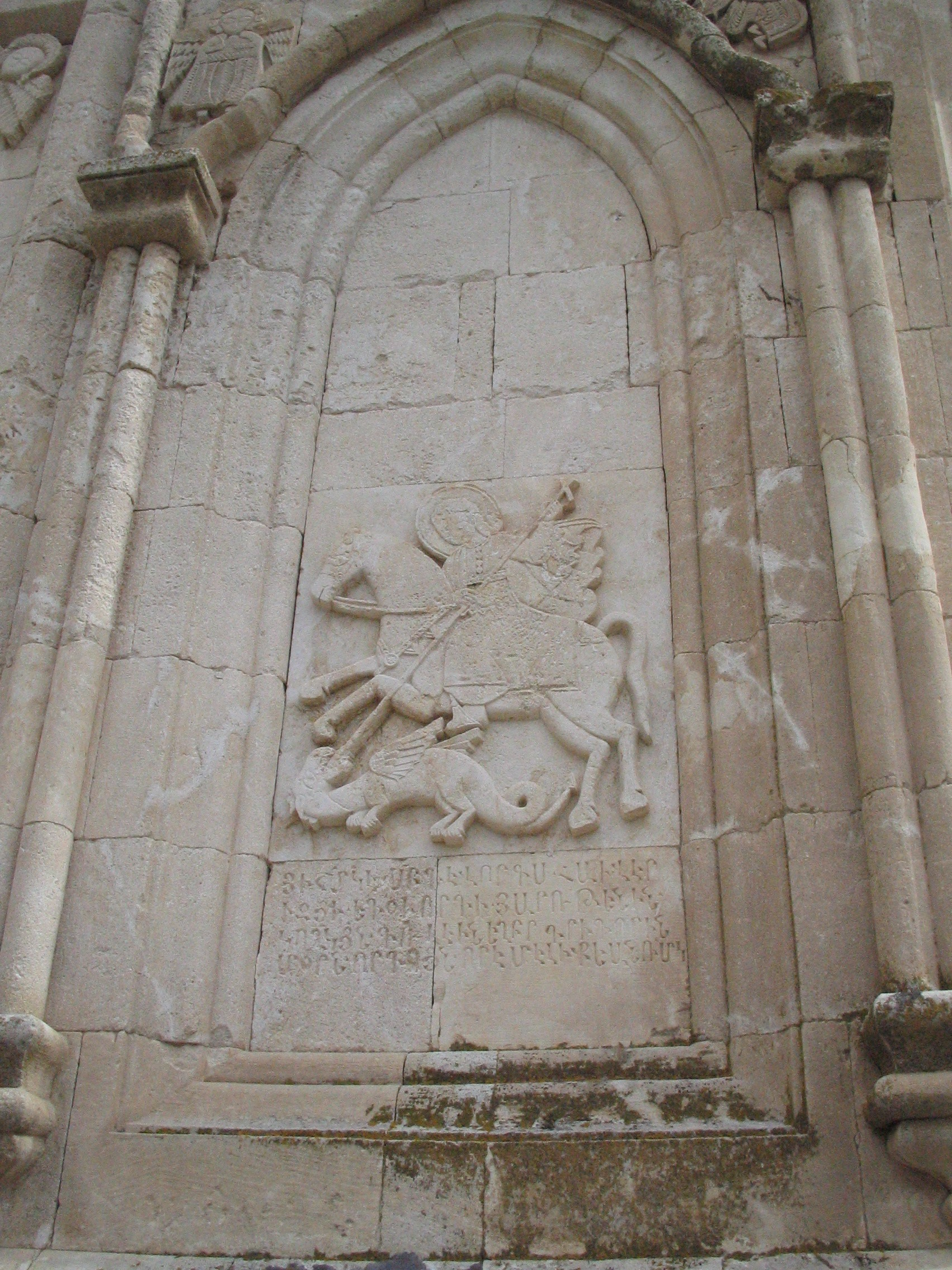

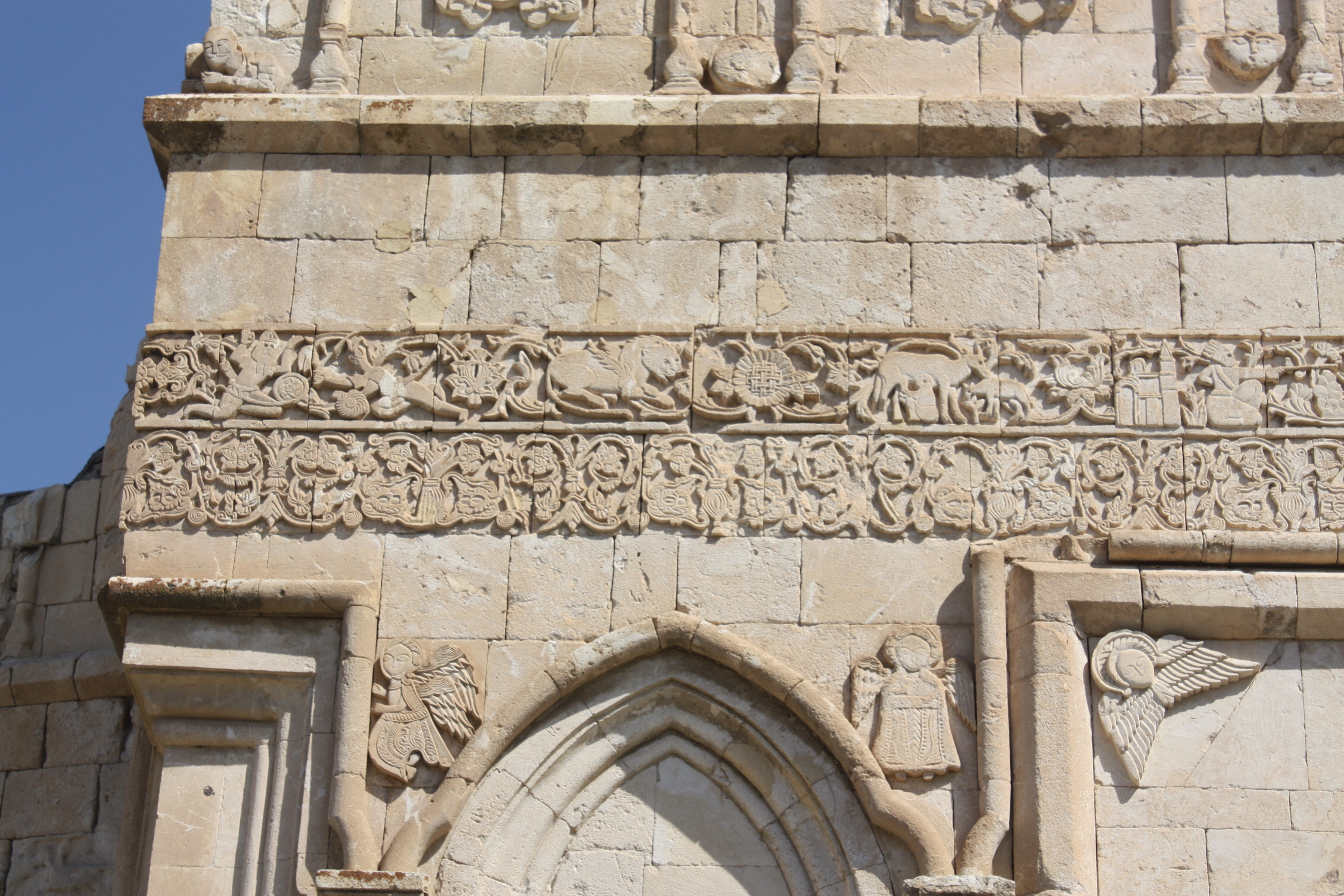

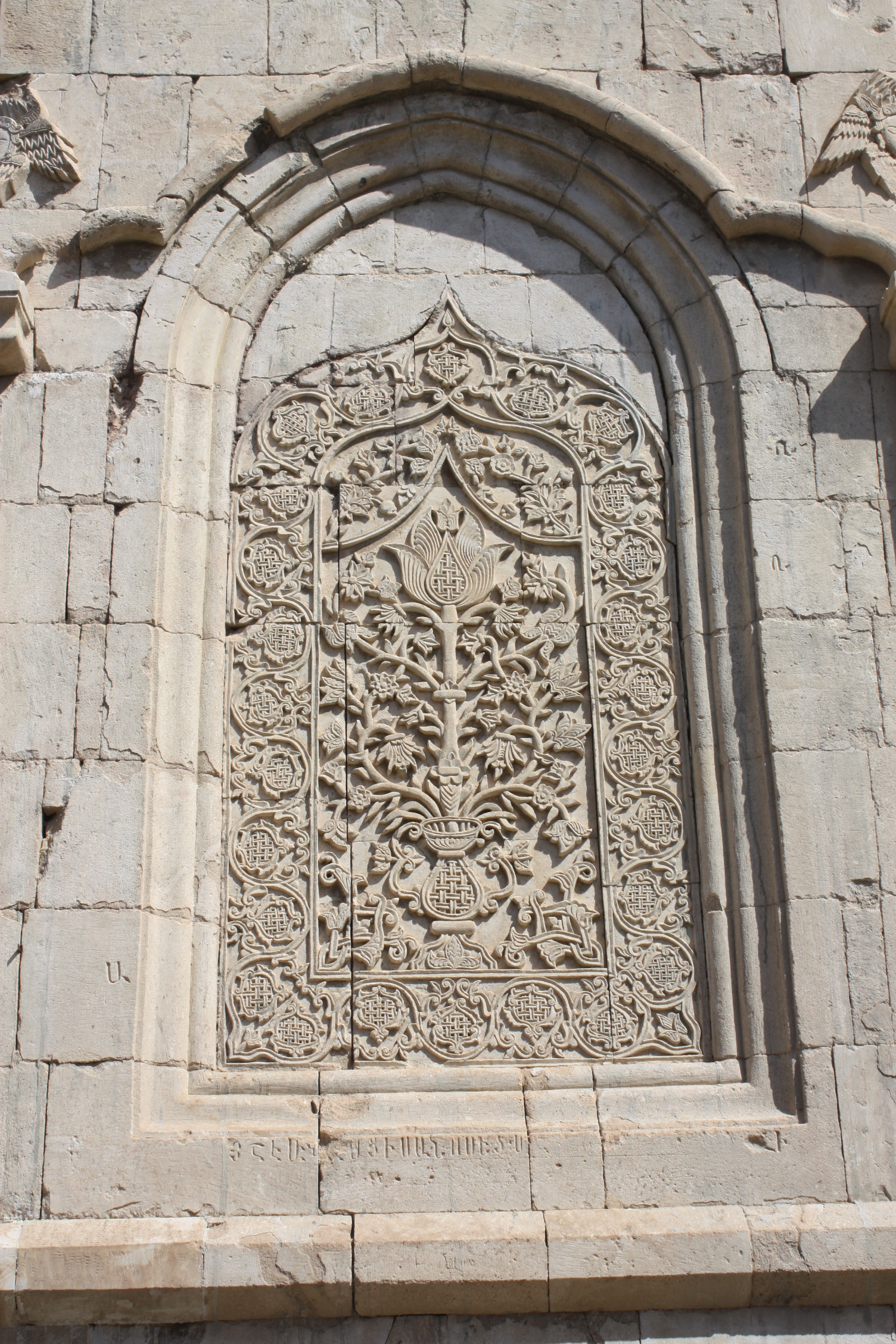

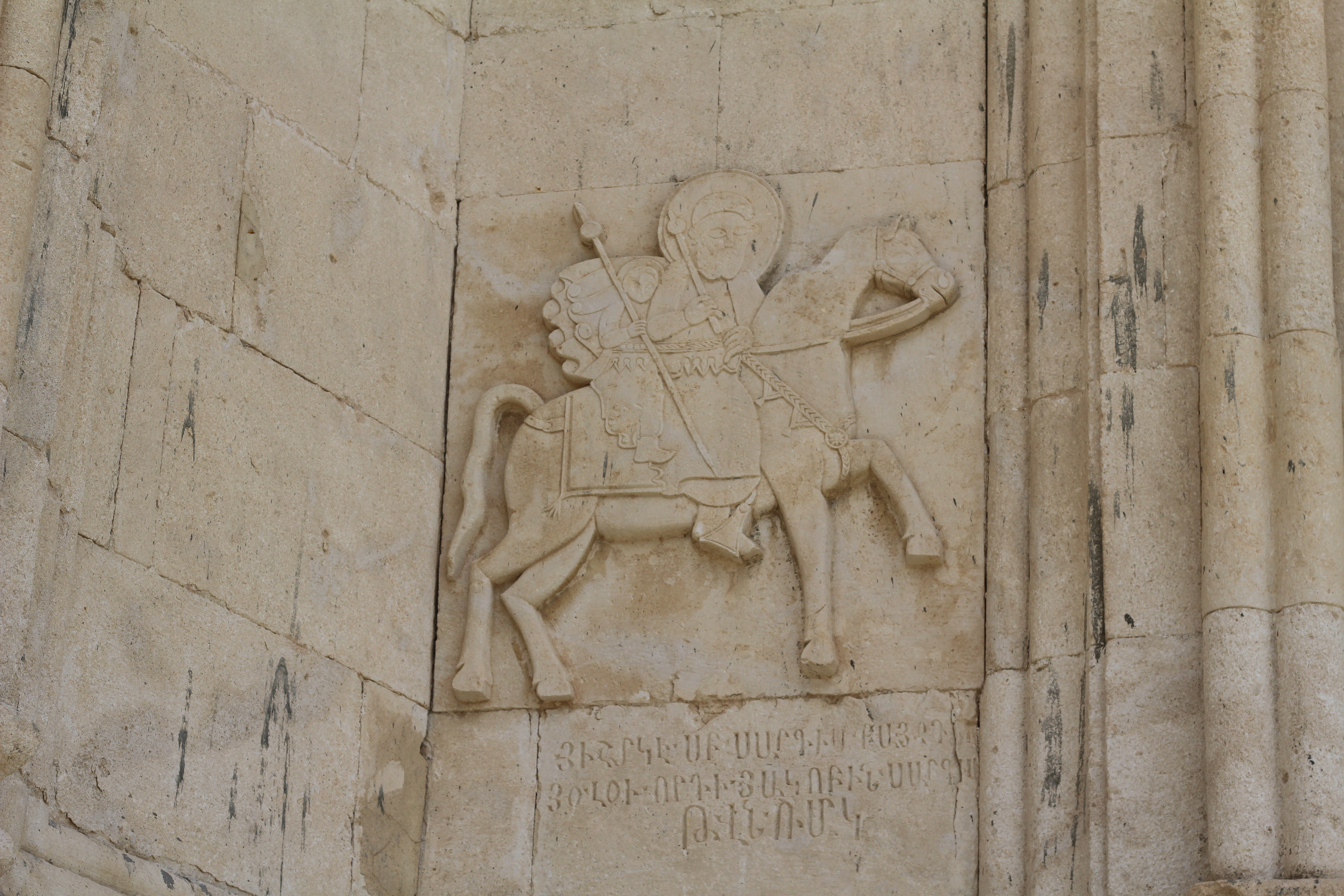

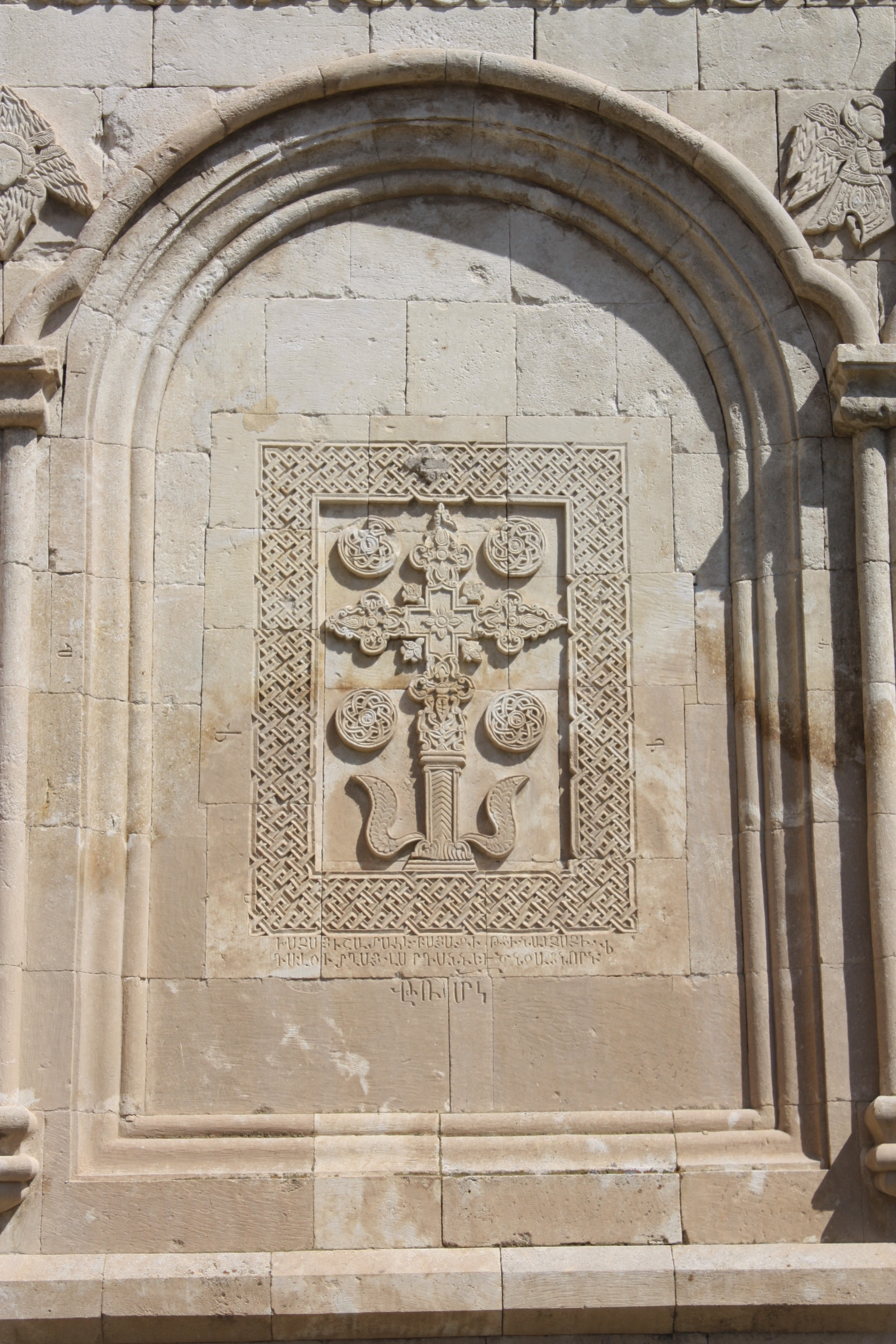

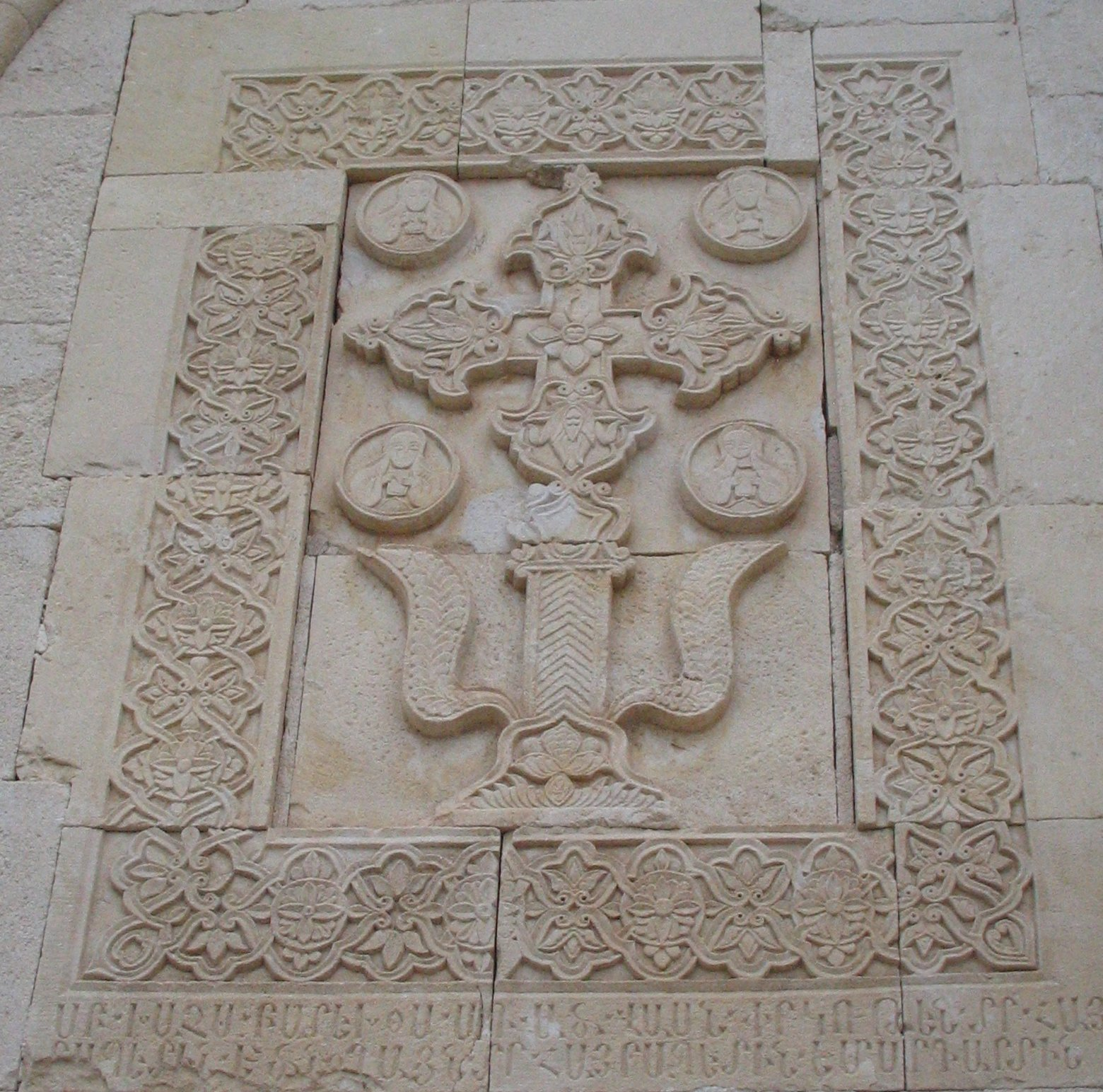
Details of craftsmanship

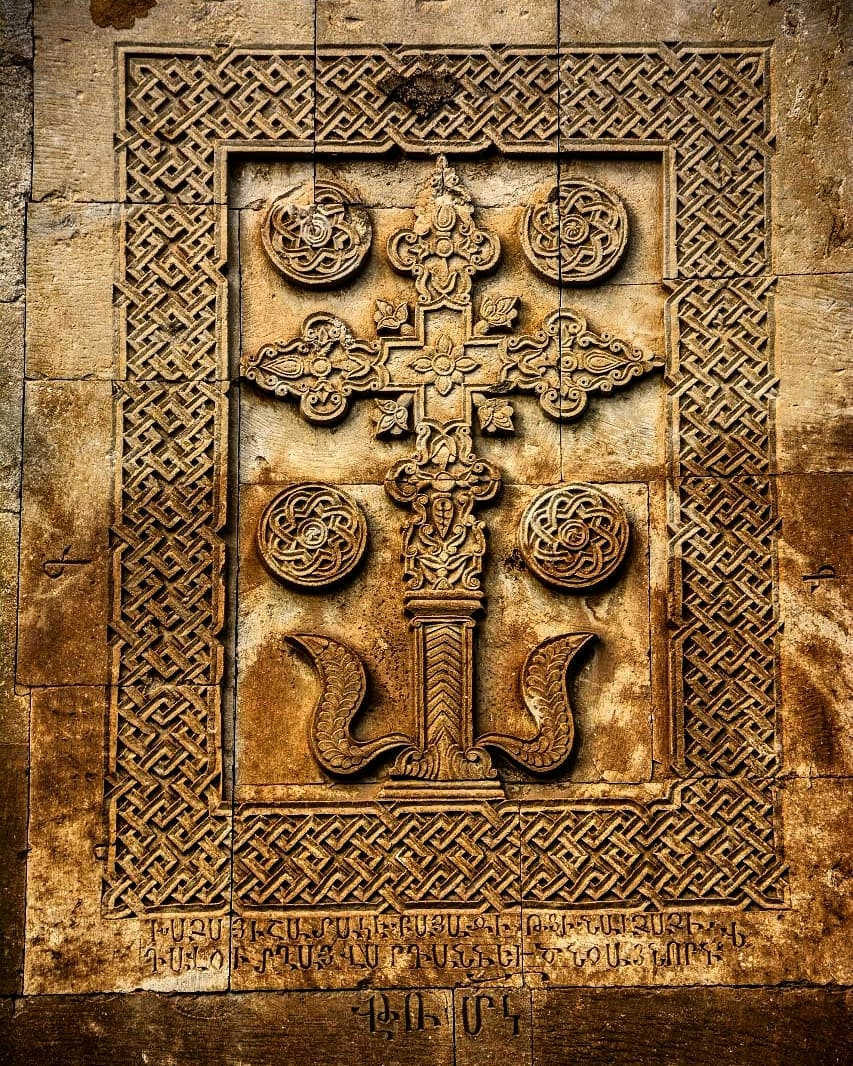

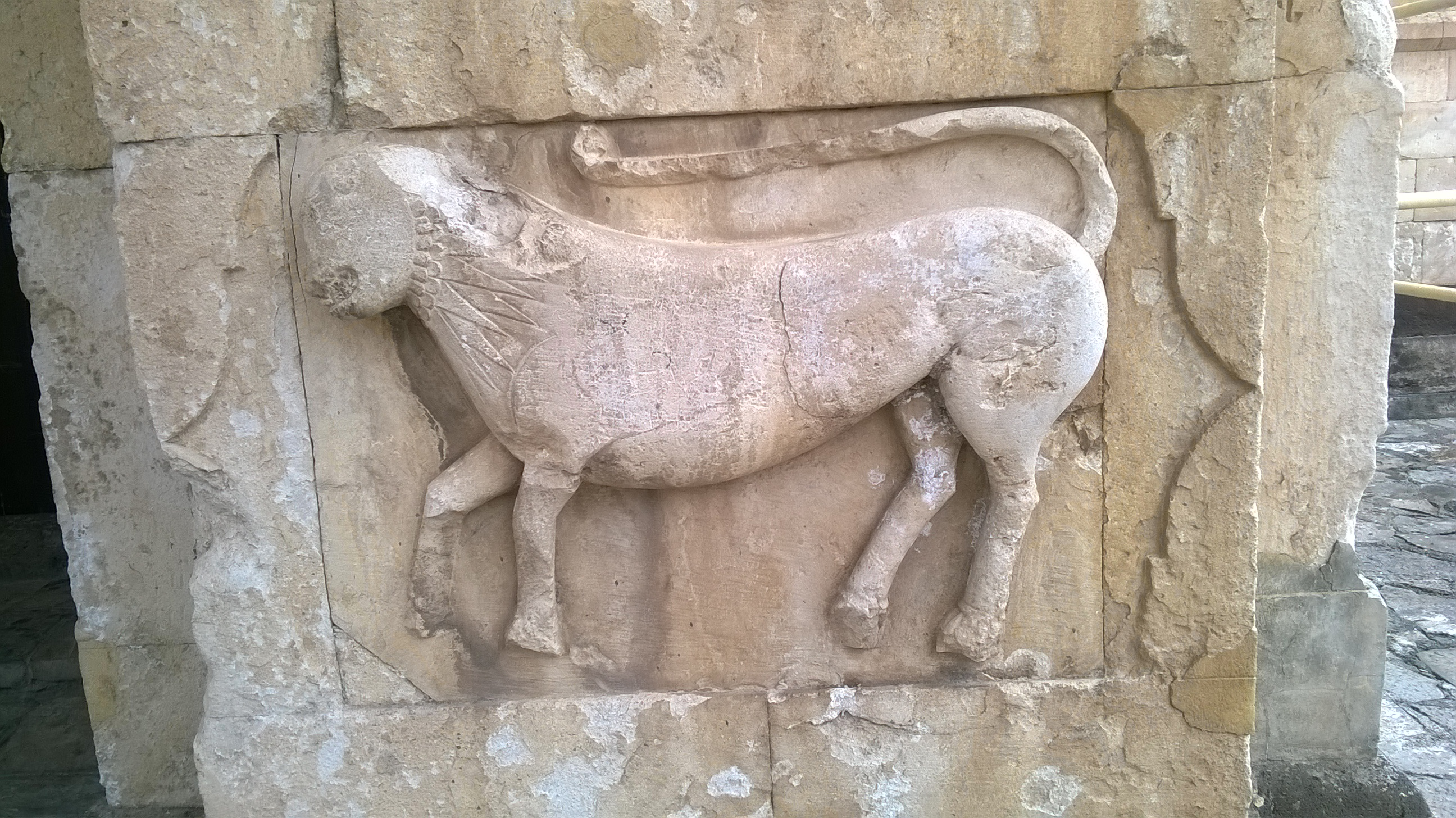

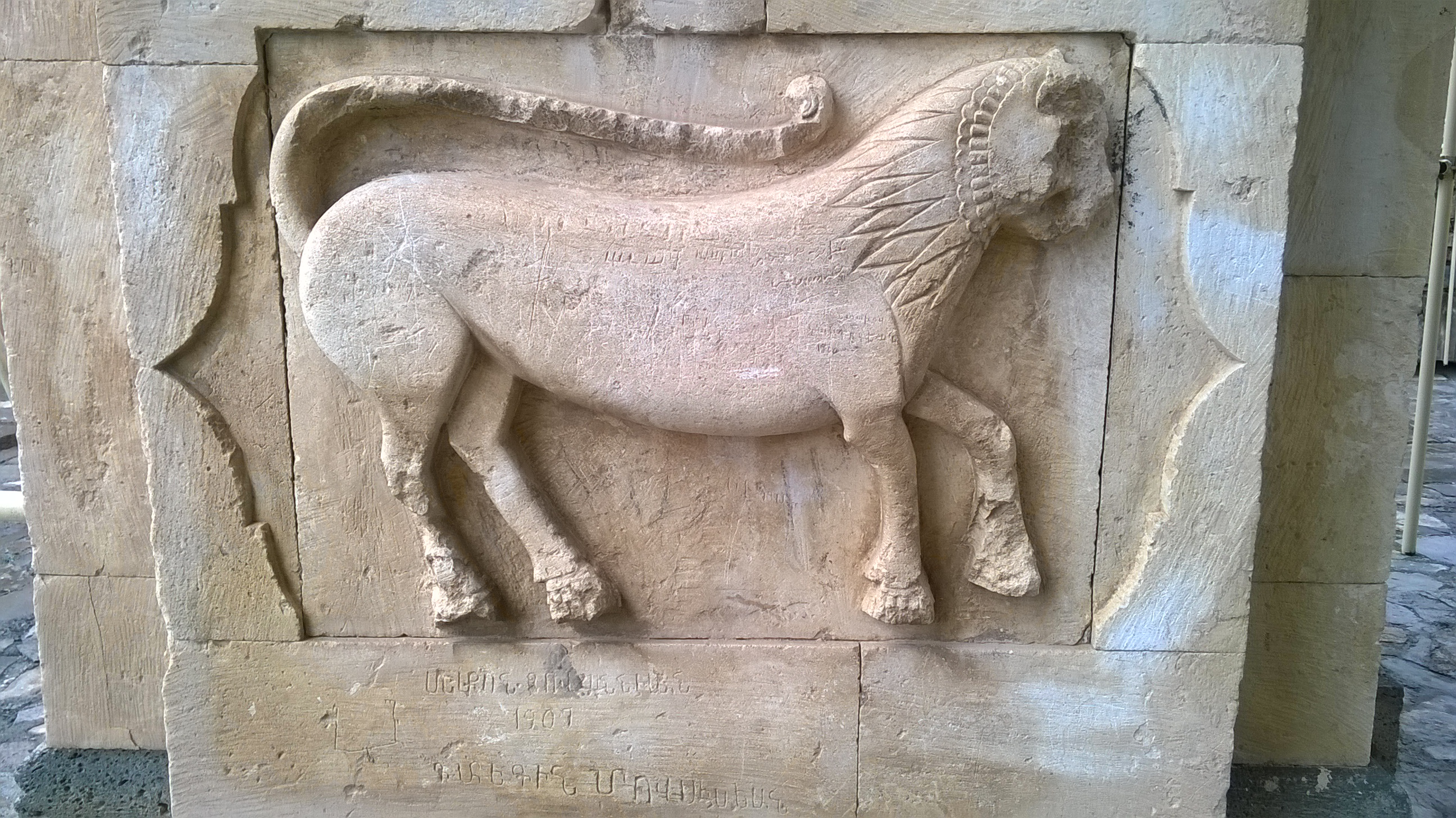

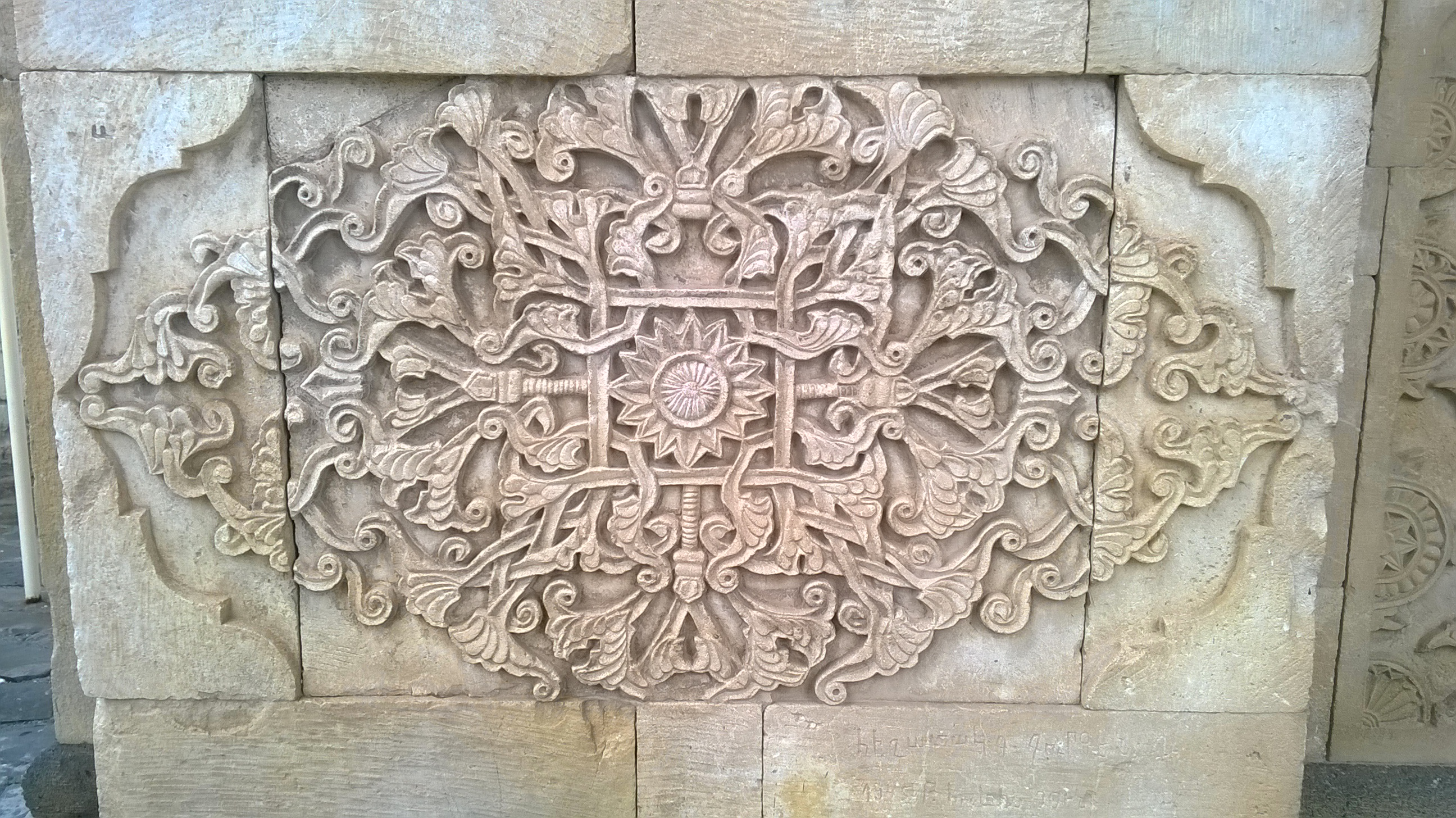

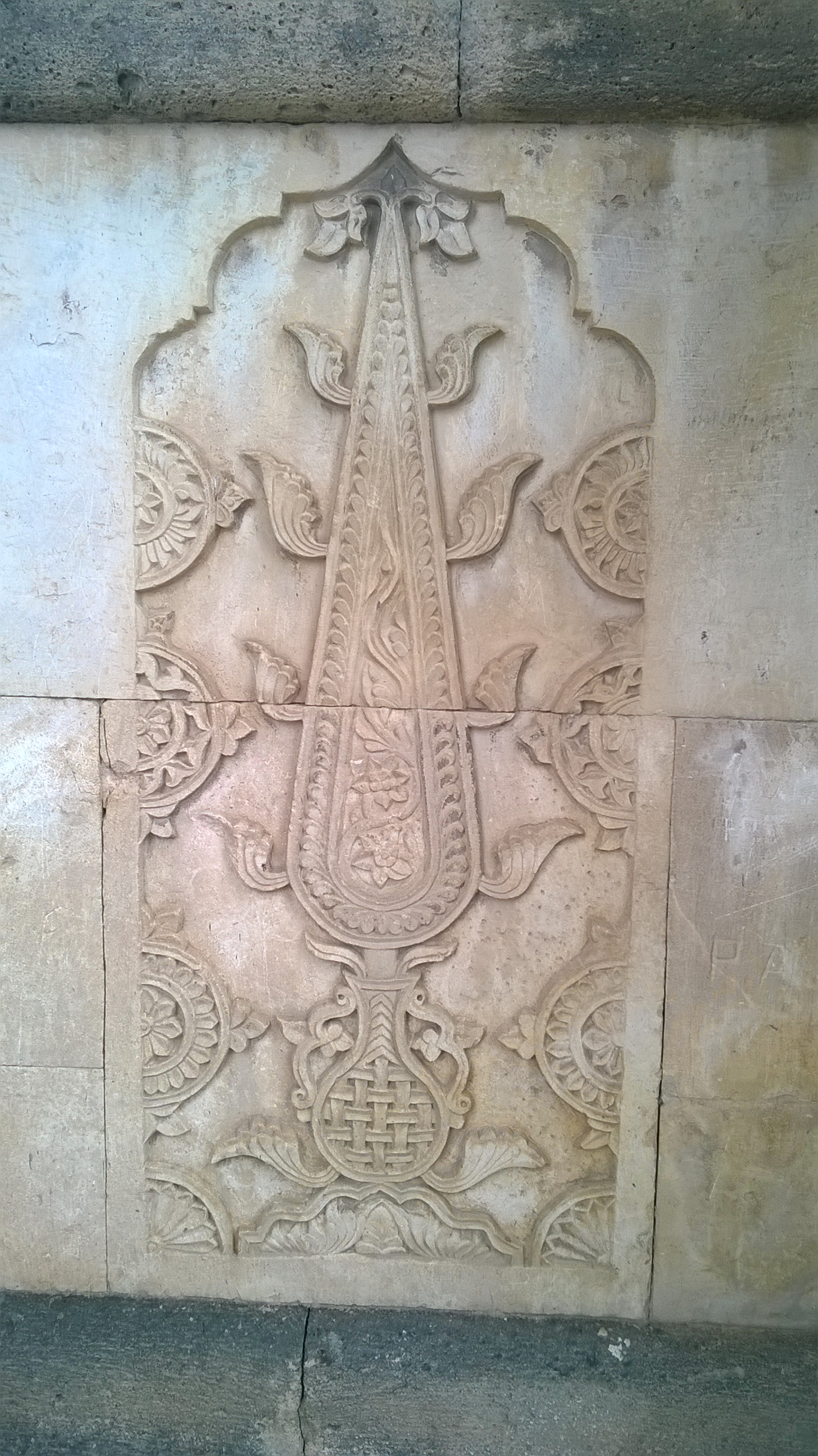

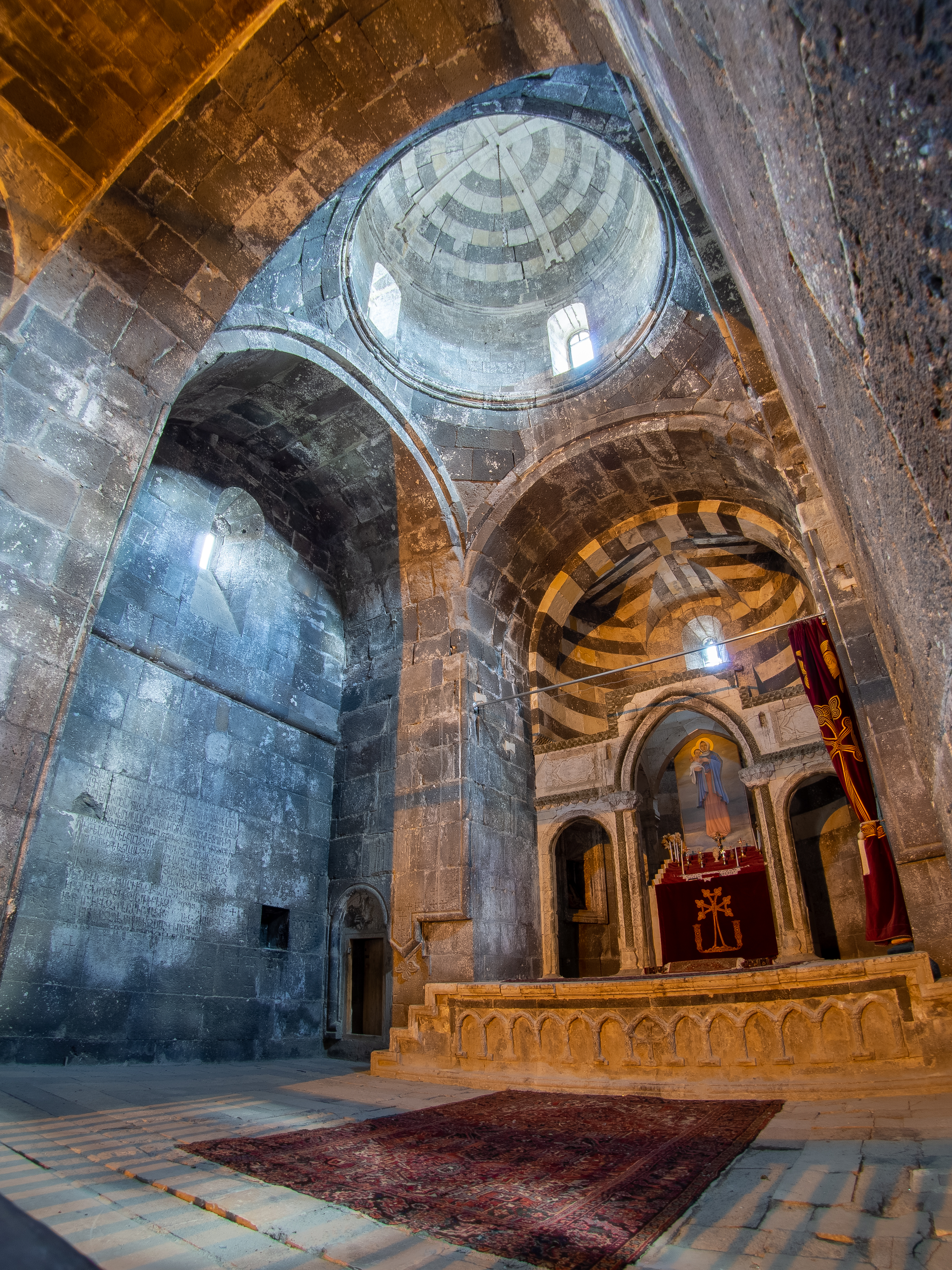

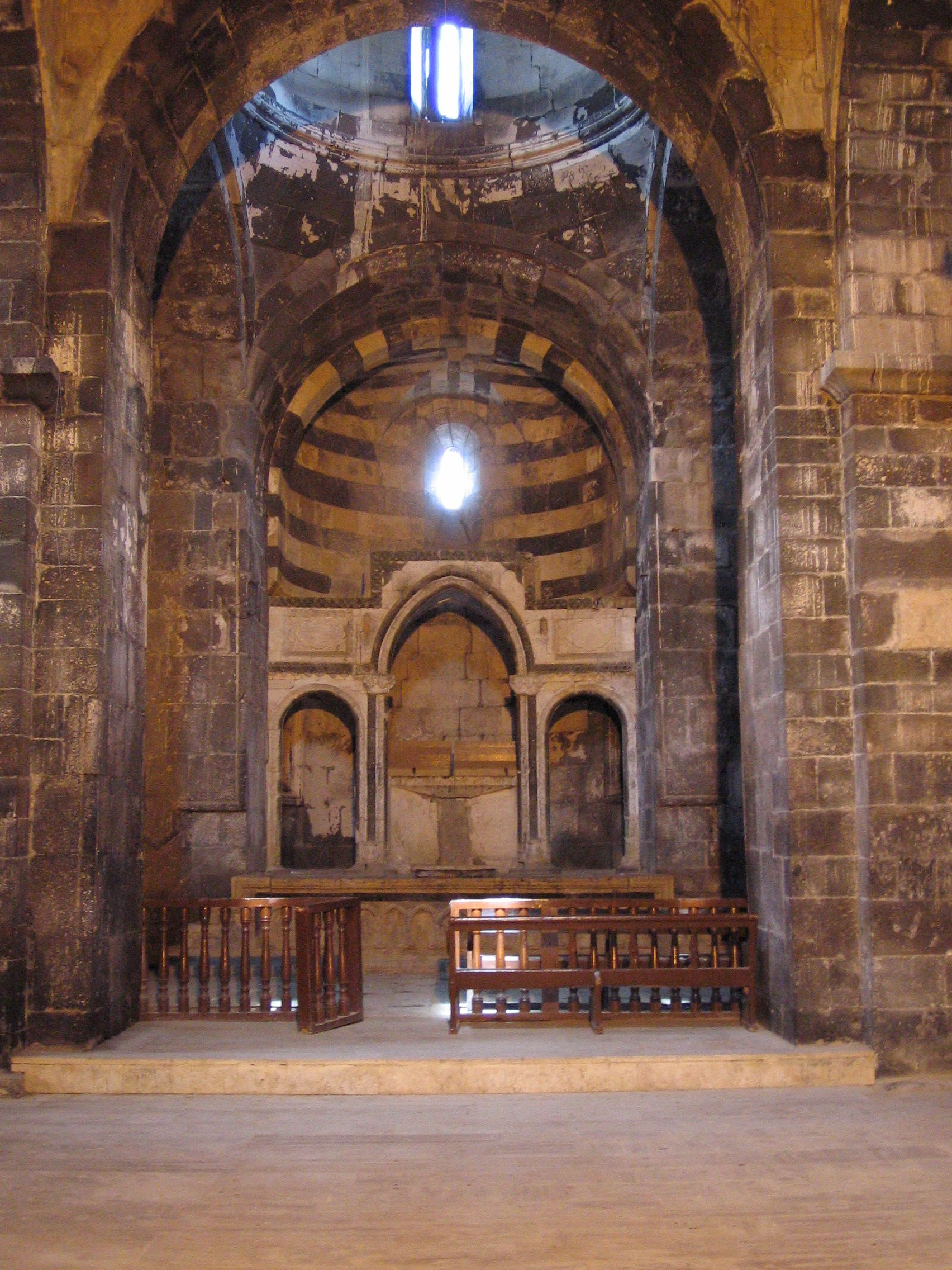
Interior view

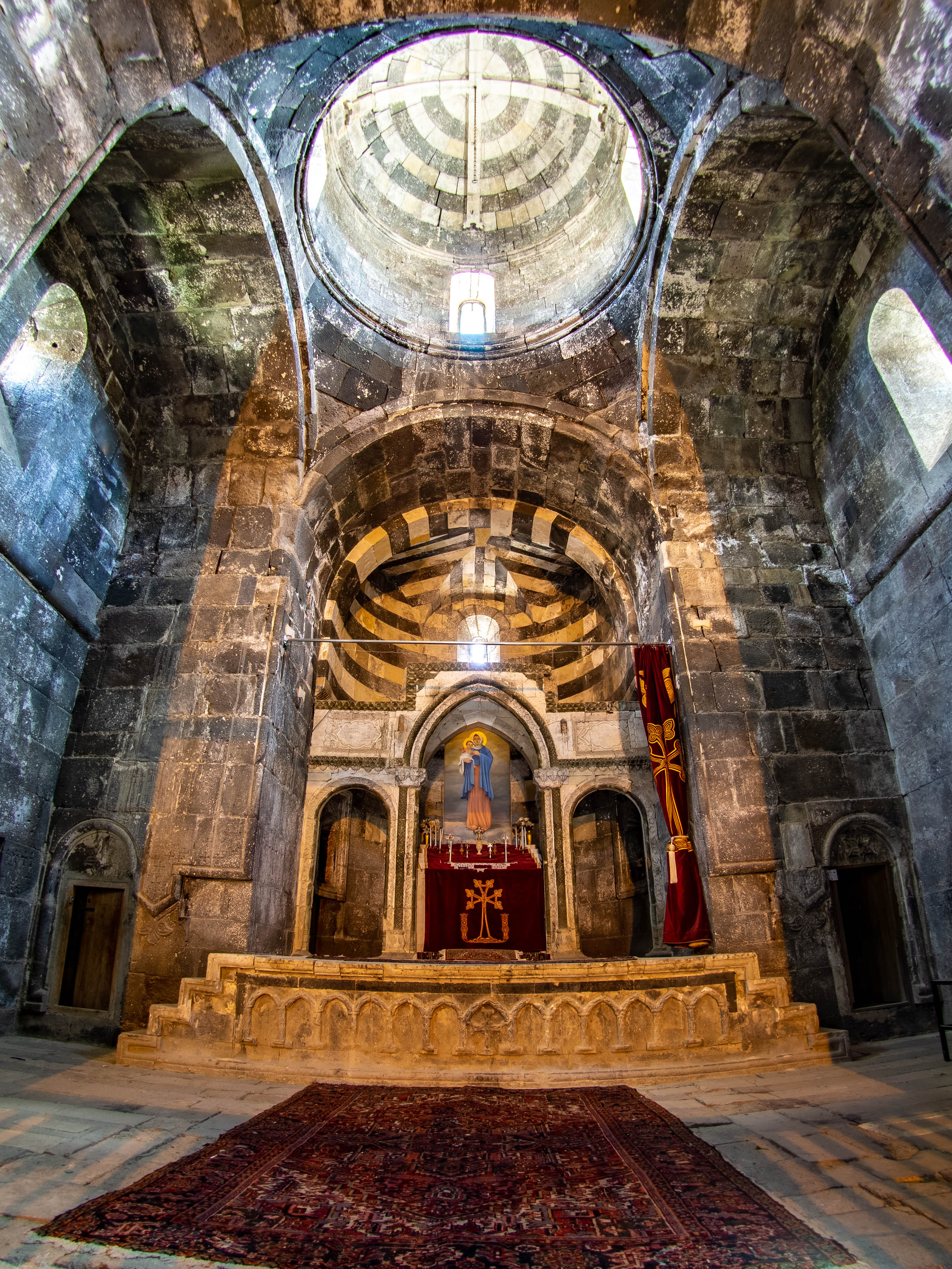

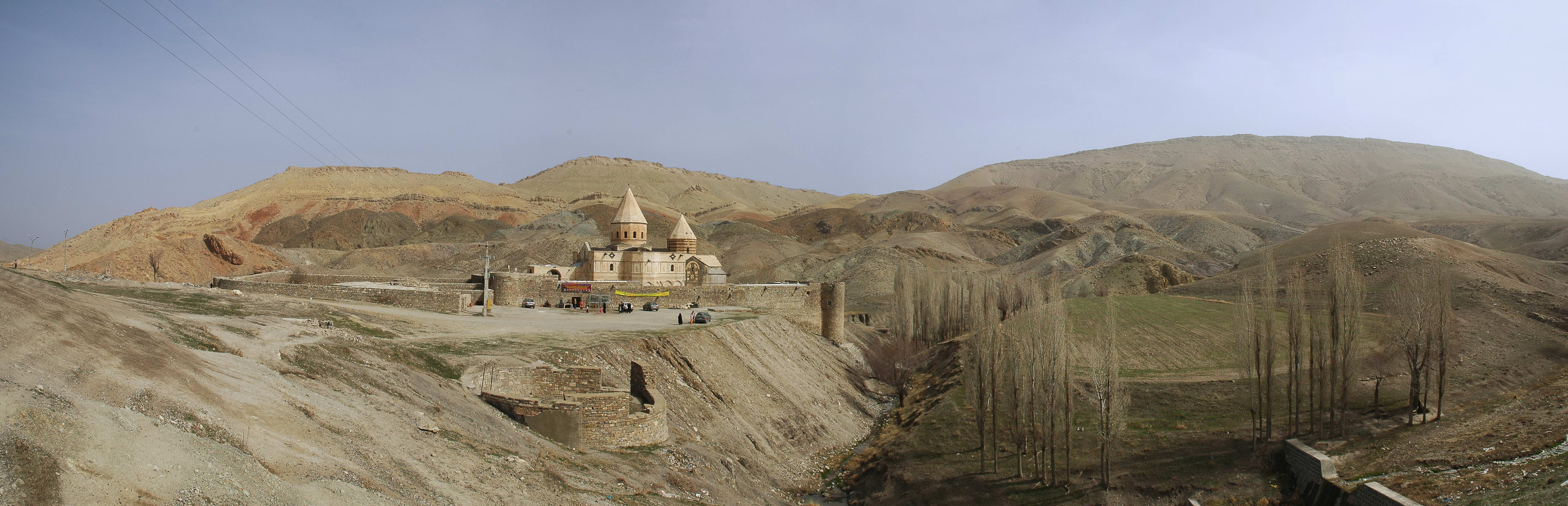
Panoramic view from the outside

== See also ==
- Chapel of Dzordzor
- Chapel of Chupan
- Church of the Holy Mother of God, Darashamb
- List of Christian pilgrimage sites
- Saint Bartholomew Monastery
- Saint Stepanos Monastery
- Vaspurakan
