= Qareh Kelisa =

Qareh Kelisa قره كليسا
- Village
- Location within Iran
- Coordinates: 39°05′23″N 44°32′41″E
- Country: Iran
- Province: West Azerbaijan
- County: Chaldoran
- Bakhsh: Central
- Rural District: Baba Jik

Population (2006)
  - Total: 174
- Time zone: UTC+3:30 (IRST)
  - Summer (DST): UTC+4:30 (IRDT)

Qareh Kelisa (Persian: قره كليسا, also Romanized as Qareh Kelīsā and Qarah Kalīsā; in Armenian: Ղարաքիլիսա) is a village in Baba Jik Rural District, in the Central District of Chaldoran County, West Azerbaijan Province, Iran. At the 2006 census, its population was 174, in 32 families, all Azerbaijanis.

== See also ==
- Monastery of Saint Thaddeus
