= Pilgrimage of Saint Thaddeus Monastery =

UNESCO Intangible Cultural Heritage

- UNESCO Intangible Cultural Heritage
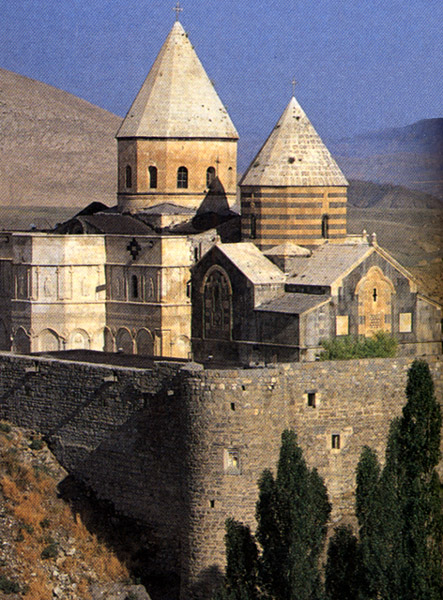
- Qara Kelisa ("black church", Sourp Thade in armenian), Chaldoran, West Azerbaïjan, Iran.
- Country: Iran
- Reference: 01571
- Region: Asia–Pacific

Inscription history
- Inscription: 2020

The Pilgrimage of Saint Thaddeus Monastery is an annual religious ritual held at the St. Thaddeus Monastery (locally known as Qara Kelisa) in West Azerbaijan Province, Iran. Armenian Christians from different parts of the world gather at this historical site, which is recognized as a UNESCO World Heritage Site, to perform religious ceremonies in honor of Saint Thaddeus, one of the apostles of Jesus Christ. The event holds significant religious and cultural importance for the Armenian community and is considered one of the most prominent Christian pilgrimages in Iran.

== History and significance ==
St. Thaddeus Monastery dates to the 7th century. According to Armenian tradition, Saint Thaddeus, one of Christ's twelve apostles, traveled to Armenia in the 1st century CE to spread Christianity. He was later martyred, and the monastery was built at the site of his burial. The pilgrimage, also known as the Badarak (meaning "Holy Mass" in Armenian), commemorates his martyrdom and contribution to the spread of Christianity in the region.

Despite being located in Iran, the monastery has remained an essential religious landmark for Armenian Christians. The pilgrimage is particularly significant for Iranian-Armenians and Armenians from neighboring countries, such as Armenia, Syria, Lebanon, and Russia. Participants engage in prayers, liturgical services, and cultural activities, strengthening their communal and spiritual ties.

== UNESCO Recognition and Cultural Heritage ==
In 2020, the Pilgrimage of Saint Thaddeus was jointly nominated by Iran and Armenia for recognition as an Intangible Cultural Heritage of Humanity by UNESCO. The Intergovernmental Committee for the Safeguarding of the Intangible Cultural Heritage unanimously approved its inclusion.

The pilgrimage is one of the few officially recognized Christian events in Irans.

== Pilgrimage rituals ==
The pilgrimage typically takes place in July, lasting for three days. Armenian clergy, pilgrims, and tourists arrive at Qara Kelisa to participate in various rituals, including:

- Holy Mass and Prayers: Religious ceremonies led by Armenian priests, with readings from the Bible and hymns sung in Classical Armenian.
- Baptism Ceremonies: Many Armenian families use the occasion to baptize their children at the monastery, believing it brings spiritual blessings.
- Communal Gatherings: The event serves as a cultural reunion for the Armenian diaspora, with traditional music, dance, and local delicacies being shared among attendees.
- Processions and offerings: Pilgrims light candles, make religious offerings, and walk in processions around the monastery, honoring Saint Thaddeus.

== Preservation ==
With increasing global recognition, both Iran and Armenia have taken steps to preserve the monastery and the annual pilgrimage. The site is maintained by Iran’s Cultural Heritage, Handicrafts, and Tourism Organization (ICHHTO), ensuring conservation efforts align with UNESCO standards.

== See also ==
- St. Thaddeus Monastery
- Armenian Apostolic Church
- Christianity in Iran
- UNESCO Intangible Cultural Heritage
