= Tumar Aghaj =

Tumar Aghaj طوماراغاج
- Village
- Location within Iran
- Coordinates: 36°35′02″N 46°34′02″E
- Country: Iran
- Province: West Azerbaijan
- County: Shahin Dezh
- Bakhsh: Central
- Rural District: Hulasu

Population (2006)
  - Total: 374
- Time zone: UTC+3:30 (IRST)
  - Summer (DST): UTC+4:30 (IRDT)

Tumar Aghaj (Persian: طوماراغاج, also Romanized as Ţūmār Āghāj; also known as Ţūmār Āqāj) is a village in Hulasu Rural District, in the Central District of Shahin Dezh County, West Azerbaijan Province, Iran. At the 2006 census, its population was 374, in 73 families.
