= Qaleh Qurineh =

Qaleh Qurineh قلعه قورينه
- Village
- Location within Iran
- Coordinates: 36°33′14″N 46°50′31″E
- Country: Iran
- Province: West Azerbaijan
- County: Shahin Dezh
- Bakhsh: Central
- Rural District: Hulasu

Population (2006)
  - Total: 80
- Time zone: UTC+3:30 (IRST)
  - Summer (DST): UTC+4:30 (IRDT)

Qaleh Qurineh (Persian: قلعه قورينه, also Romanized as Qal‘eh Qūrīneh) is a village in Hulasu Rural District, in the Central District of Shahin Dezh County, West Azerbaijan Province, Iran. At the 2006 census, its population was 80, in 15 families.
