= Safiar Khan =

Safiar Khan صفيارخان
- Village
- Location within Iran
- Coordinates: 36°28′54″N 46°50′59″E
- Country: Iran
- Province: West Azerbaijan
- County: Shahin Dezh
- Bakhsh: Central
- Rural District: Safa Khaneh

Population (2006)
  - Total: 176
- Time zone: UTC+3:30 (IRST)
  - Summer (DST): UTC+4:30 (IRDT)

Safiar Khan (Persian: صفيارخان, also Romanized as Şafīār Khān and Şafīyār Khān) is a village in Safa Khaneh Rural District, in the Central District of Shahin Dezh County, West Azerbaijan Province, Iran. At the 2006 census, its population was 176, in 31 families.
