= Beygtuli-ye Olya =

Beygtuli-ye Olya بيگ تولي عليا
- Village
- Location within Iran
- Coordinates: 36°27′18″N 46°33′15″E
- Country: Iran
- Province: West Azerbaijan
- County: Shahin Dezh
- Bakhsh: Central
- Rural District: Safa Khaneh

Population (2006)
  - Total: 222
- Time zone: UTC+3:30 (IRST)
  - Summer (DST): UTC+4:30 (IRDT)

Beygtuli-ye Olya (Persian: بيگ تولي عليا, also Romanized as Beygtūlī-ye ‘Olyā) is a village in Safa Khaneh Rural District, in the Central District of Shahin Dezh County, West Azerbaijan Province, Iran. At the 2006 census, its population was 222, in 39 families.
