= Owch Darreh =

Owch Darreh اوچ دره
- Village
- Location within Iran
- Coordinates: 36°38′02″N 46°52′57″E
- Country: Iran
- Province: West Azerbaijan
- County: Shahin Dezh
- Bakhsh: Central
- Rural District: Hulasu

Population (2006)
  - Total: 74
- Time zone: UTC+3:30 (IRST)
  - Summer (DST): UTC+4:30 (IRDT)

Owch Darreh (Persian: اوچ دره, also Romanized as Ūchdarreh) is a village in Hulasu Rural District, in the Central District of Shahin Dezh County, West Azerbaijan Province, Iran. At the 2006 census, its population was 74, in 16 families.
