= Bayram Qalehsi =

Bayram Qalehsi بايرام قلعه سي
- Village
- Location within Iran
- Coordinates: 36°35′23″N 46°47′06″E
- Country: Iran
- Province: West Azerbaijan
- County: Shahin Dezh
- Bakhsh: Central
- Rural District: Hulasu

Population (2006)
  - Total: 37
- Time zone: UTC+3:30 (IRST)
  - Summer (DST): UTC+4:30 (IRDT)

Bayram Qalehsi (Persian: بايرام قلعه سي, also Romanized as Bāyrām Qal‘ehsī; also known as Bīrām Qal‘ehsī) is a village in Hulasu Rural District, in the Central District of Shahin Dezh County, West Azerbaijan Province, Iran. At the 2006 census, its population was 37, in 8 families.
