= Gachi Qalehsi =

Gachi Qalehsi گچي قلعه سي
- Village
- Location within Iran
- Coordinates: 36°28′09″N 46°48′33″E
- Country: Iran
- Province: West Azerbaijan
- County: Shahin Dezh
- Bakhsh: Central
- Rural District: Safa Khaneh

Population (2006)
  - Total: 170
- Time zone: UTC+3:30 (IRST)
  - Summer (DST): UTC+4:30 (IRDT)

Gachi Qalehsi (Persian: گچي قلعه سي, also Romanized as Gachī Qal‘ehsī) is a village in Safa Khaneh Rural District, in the Central District of Shahin Dezh County, West Azerbaijan Province, Iran. At the 2006 census, its population was 170, in 32 families.
