= Qezel Qayah =

Qezel Qayah (Persian: قزل قيه) may refer to:

- Qezel Qayah, Ardabil
- Qezel Qayah, Charuymaq, East Azerbaijan Province
- Qezel Qayah, Sarab, East Azerbaijan Province
- Qezel Qayeh-ye Olya, West Azerbaijan Province
- Qezel Qayeh-ye Sofla, West Azerbaijan Province
- Qezel Qayeh-ye Vosta, West Azerbaijan Province
