= Tark-e Viran =

Tark-e Viran ترك ويران
- Village
- Location within Iran
- Coordinates: 36°36′05″N 46°38′47″E
- Country: Iran
- Province: West Azerbaijan
- County: Shahin Dezh
- Bakhsh: Central
- Rural District: Hulasu

Population (2006)
  - Total: 267
- Time zone: UTC+3:30 (IRST)
  - Summer (DST): UTC+4:30 (IRDT)

Tark-e Viran (Persian: ترك ويران, also Romanized as Tark-e Vīrān) is a village in Hulasu Rural District, in the Central District of Shahin Dezh County, West Azerbaijan Province, Iran. At the 2006 census, its population was 267, in 49 families.
