= Cheragh Abdal =

Cheragh Abdal چراغ ابدال
- Village
- Location within Iran
- Coordinates: 36°30′25″N 46°33′14″E
- Country: Iran
- Province: West Azerbaijan
- County: Shahin Dezh
- Bakhsh: Central
- Rural District: Hulasu

Population (2006)
  - Total: 53
- Time zone: UTC+3:30 (IRST)
  - Summer (DST): UTC+4:30 (IRDT)

Cheragh Abdal (Persian: چراغ ابدال, also Romanized as Cherāgh Abdāl) is a village in Hulasu Rural District, in the Central District of Shahin Dezh County, West Azerbaijan Province, Iran. At the 2006 census, its population was 53, in 8 families.
