= Elibalta =

Elibalta الي بالتا
- Village
- Location within Iran
- Coordinates: 36°41′56″N 46°42′57″E
- Country: Iran
- Province: West Azerbaijan
- County: Shahin Dezh
- Bakhsh: Central
- Rural District: Hulasu

Population (2006)
  - Total: 244
- Time zone: UTC+3:30 (IRST)
  - Summer (DST): UTC+4:30 (IRDT)

Elibalta (Persian: الي بالتا, also Romanized as Elībāltā; also known as ‘Alībāltā and Ālībāltā) is a village in Hulasu Rural District, in the Central District of Shahin Dezh County, West Azerbaijan Province, Iran. At the 2006 census, its population was 244, in 48 families.
