= Gheyb Ali =

Gheyb Ali غيب علي
- Village
- Location within Iran
- Coordinates: 36°36′00″N 46°32′48″E
- Country: Iran
- Province: West Azerbaijan
- County: Shahin Dezh
- Bakhsh: Central
- Rural District: Mahmudabad

Population (2006)
  - Total: 93
- Time zone: UTC+3:30 (IRST)
  - Summer (DST): UTC+4:30 (IRDT)

Gheyb Ali (Persian: غيب علي, also Romanized as Gheyb ‘Alī and Gheyb‘alī) is a village in Mahmudabad Rural District, in the Central District of Shahin Dezh County, West Azerbaijan Province, Iran. At the 2006 census, its population was 93, in 19 families.
