= Bibi Kand =

Bibi Kand بي بي كند
- Village
- Location within Iran
- Coordinates: 36°40′54″N 46°26′24″E
- Country: Iran
- Province: West Azerbaijan
- County: Shahin Dezh
- Bakhsh: Central
- Rural District: Mahmudabad

Population (2006)
  - Total: 277
- Time zone: UTC+3:30 (IRST)
  - Summer (DST): UTC+4:30 (IRDT)

Bibi Kand (Persian: بي بي كند, also Romanized as Bībī Kand; also known as Bībī Kandī) is a village in Mahmudabad Rural District, in the Central District of Shahin Dezh County, West Azerbaijan Province, Iran. At the 2006 census, its population was 277, in 46 families.
