= Kani Sanjud =

Kani Sanjud كاني سنجود
- Village
- Location within Iran
- Coordinates: 36°36′14″N 46°29′10″E
- Country: Iran
- Province: West Azerbaijan
- County: Shahin Dezh
- Bakhsh: Central
- Rural District: Mahmudabad

Population (2006)
  - Total: 40
- Time zone: UTC+3:30 (IRST)
  - Summer (DST): UTC+4:30 (IRDT)

Kani Sanjud (Persian: كاني سنجود, also Romanized as Kānī Sanjūd) is a village in Mahmudabad Rural District, in the Central District of Shahin Dezh County, West Azerbaijan Province, Iran. At the 2006 census, its population was 40, in 8 families.
