= Khvajehlu =

Khvajehlu خواجه لو
- Village
- Location within Iran
- Coordinates: 36°34′39″N 46°42′05″E
- Country: Iran
- Province: West Azerbaijan
- County: Shahin Dezh
- Bakhsh: Central
- Rural District: Hulasu

Population (2006)
  - Total: 134
- Time zone: UTC+3:30 (IRST)
  - Summer (DST): UTC+4:30 (IRDT)

Khvajehlu (Persian: خواجه لو, also Romanized as Khvājehlū) is a village in Hulasu Rural District, in the Central District of Shahin Dezh County, West Azerbaijan Province, Iran. At the 2006 census, its population was 134, in 23 families.
