= Chichaklu =

Chichaklu or Chicheklu (Persian: چيچكلو), also rendered as Chichiklu, may refer to various places in Iran:

- Chichaklu, East Azerbaijan
- Chichaklu, Tehran
- Chichaklu, Shahin Dezh, West Azerbaijan Province
- Chichakluy-e Bash Qaleh, Urmia County, West Azerbaijan Province
- Chichakluy-e Hajji Aqa, Urmia County, West Azerbaijan Province
- Chichagluy-e Mansur, Urmia County, West Azerbaijan Province
