= Khan Qoli =

Khan Qoli خانقلي
- Village
- Location within Iran
- Coordinates: 36°34′37″N 46°52′11″E
- Country: Iran
- Province: West Azerbaijan
- County: Shahin Dezh
- Bakhsh: Central
- Rural District: Hulasu

Population (2006)
  - Total: 192
- Time zone: UTC+3:30 (IRST)
  - Summer (DST): UTC+4:30 (IRDT)

Khan Qoli (Persian: خانقلي, also Romanized as Khān Qolī) is a village in Hulasu Rural District, in the Central District of Shahin Dezh County, West Azerbaijan Province, Iran. At the 2006 census, its population was 192, in 35 families.
