= Hasan Owlan =

Hasan Owlan حسن اولان
- Village
- Location within Iran
- Coordinates: 36°37′09″N 46°43′08″E
- Country: Iran
- Province: West Azerbaijan
- County: Shahin Dezh
- Bakhsh: Central
- Rural District: Hulasu

Population (2006)
  - Total: 34
- Time zone: UTC+3:30 (IRST)
  - Summer (DST): UTC+4:30 (IRDT)

Hasan Owlan (Persian: حسن اولان, also Romanized as Ḩasan Owlān; also known as Ḩasanlūlān) is a village in Hulasu Rural District, in the Central District of Shahin Dezh County, West Azerbaijan Province, Iran. At the 2006 census, its population was 34, in 6 families.
