= Hamzeh Qasem =

Hamzeh Qasem حمزه قاسم
- Village
- Location within Iran
- Coordinates: 36°32′15″N 46°46′05″E
- Country: Iran
- Province: West Azerbaijan
- County: Shahin Dezh
- Bakhsh: Central
- Rural District: Hulasu

Population (2006)
  - Total: 174
- Time zone: UTC+3:30 (IRST)
  - Summer (DST): UTC+4:30 (IRDT)

Hamzeh Qasem (Persian: حمزه قاسم, also Romanized as Ḩamzeh Qāsem) is a village in Hulasu Rural District, in the Central District of Shahin Dezh County, West Azerbaijan Province, Iran. At the 2006 census, its population was 174, in 33 families.
