= Abbas Bolaghi, Shahin Dezh =

Village in West Azerbaijan province, Iran

Abbas Bolaghi Persian: عباس بلاغي
- Village
- Location within Iran
- Coordinates: 36°44′49″N 46°29′44″E
- Country: Iran
- Province: West Azerbaijan
- County: Shahin Dezh
- District: Central
- Rural District: Mahmudabad

Population (2016)
  - Total: 375
- Time zone: UTC+3:30 (IRST)

Abbas Bolaghi (Persian: عباس بلاغي) (Note: Also romanized as ‘Abbās Bolāghī) is a village in Mahmudabad Rural District of the Central District in Shahin Dezh County, West Azerbaijan province, Iran.

== Demographics ==
=== Population ===
At the time of the 2006 National Census, the village's population was 465 in 106 households. The following census in 2011 counted 421 people in 122 households. The 2016 census measured the population of the village as 375 people in 113 households.
