= Hulasu =

Village in West Azerbaijan province, Iran

Hulasu Persian: هولاسو
- Village
- Location within Iran
- Coordinates: 36°38′36″N 46°36′53″E
- Country: Iran
- Province: West Azerbaijan
- County: Shahin Dezh
- District: Central
- Rural District: Hulasu

Population (2016)
  - Total: 1,315
- Time zone: UTC+3:30 (IRST)

Hulasu (Persian: هولاسو) (Note: Also romanized as Hūlāsū; also known as Holah Sū, Hūleh Sū, and Hūlehsū) is a village in, and the capital of, Hulasu Rural District in the Central District of Shahin Dezh County, West Azerbaijan province, Iran.

== Demographics ==
=== Population ===
At the time of the 2006 National Census, the village's population was 1,521 in 411 households. The following census in 2011 counted 1,411 people in 436 households. The 2016 census measured the population of the village as 1,315 people in 458 households.
