= Golcharmu =

Village in West Azerbaijan province, Iran

Golcharmu Persian: گل چرمو
- Village
- Location within Iran
- Coordinates: 36°27′28″N 46°31′19″E
- Country: Iran
- Province: West Azerbaijan
- County: Shahin Dezh
- District: Central
- Rural District: Safa Khaneh

Population (2016)
  - Total: 205
- Time zone: UTC+3:30 (IRST)

Golcharmu (Persian: گل چرمو) (Note: Also romanized as Golcharmū) is a village in Safa Khaneh Rural District of the Central District in Shahin Dezh County, West Azerbaijan province, Iran.

== Demographics ==
=== Population ===
At the time of the 2006 National Census, the village's population was 248 in 50 households. The following census in 2011 counted 207 people in 50 households. The 2016 census measured the population of the village as 205 people in 60 households.
