= Kord Kandi, Shahin Dezh =

Village in West Azerbaijan province, Iran

Kord Kandi Persian: كردكندي
- Village
- Location within Iran
- Coordinates: 36°39′58″N 46°43′03″E
- Country: Iran
- Province: West Azerbaijan
- County: Shahin Dezh
- District: Central
- Rural District: Hulasu

Population (2016)
  - Total: 467
- Time zone: UTC+3:30 (IRST)

Kord Kandi (Persian: كردكندي) (Note: Also romanized as Kord Kandī and Kordkandī; also known as Mazraeh) is a village in Hulasu Rural District of the Central District in Shahin Dezh County, West Azerbaijan province, Iran.

== Demographics ==
=== Population ===
At the time of the 2006 National Census, the village's population was 588 in 103 households. The following census in 2011 counted 548 people in 126 households. The 2016 census measured the population of the village as 467 people in 129 households.
