= Soleymanabad, West Azerbaijan =

Village in West Azerbaijan province, Iran

Soleymanabad Persian: سليمان اباد
- Village
- Location within Iran
- Coordinates: 36°30′17″N 46°43′19″E
- Country: Iran
- Province: West Azerbaijan
- County: Shahin Dezh
- District: Central
- Rural District: Safa Khaneh

Population (2016)
  - Total: 321
- Time zone: UTC+3:30 (IRST)

Soleymanabad (Persian: سليمان اباد) (Note: Also romanized as Soleymānābād) is a village in Safa Khaneh Rural District of the Central District in Shahin Dezh County, West Azerbaijan province, Iran.

== Demographics ==
=== Population ===
At the time of the 2006 National Census, the village's population was 422 in 90 households. The following census in 2011 counted 351 people in 91 households. The 2016 census measured the population of the village as 321 people in 101 households.
