= Fathabad, West Azerbaijan =

Village in West Azerbaijan province, Iran

Fathabad Persian: فتح اباد
- Village
- Location within Iran
- Coordinates: 36°41′51″N 46°39′05″E
- Country: Iran
- Province: West Azerbaijan
- County: Shahin Dezh
- District: Central
- Rural District: Hulasu

Population (2016)
  - Total: 458
- Time zone: UTC+3:30 (IRST)

Fathabad (Persian: فتح اباد) (Note: Also romanized as Fatḩābād) is a village in Hulasu Rural District of the Central District in Shahin Dezh County, West Azerbaijan province, Iran.

== Demographics ==
=== Population ===
At the time of the 2006 National Census, the village's population was 491 in 97 households. The following census in 2011 counted 447 people in 118 households. The 2016 census measured the population of the village as 458 people in 121 households.
