= Jushatuy-e Olya =

Jushatuy-e Olya جوشاتوي عليا
- Village
- Location within Iran
- Coordinates: 36°44′33″N 46°35′09″E
- Country: Iran
- Province: West Azerbaijan
- County: Shahin Dezh
- Bakhsh: Central
- Rural District: Mahmudabad

Population (2006)
  - Total: 270
- Time zone: UTC+3:30 (IRST)
  - Summer (DST): UTC+4:30 (IRDT)

Jushatuy-e Olya (Persian: جوشاتوي عليا, also Romanized as Jūshātūy-e ‘Olyā; also known as Jūshātū-ye ‘Olyā) is a village in Mahmudabad Rural District, in the Central District of Shahin Dezh County, West Azerbaijan Province, Iran. At the 2006 census, its population was 270, in 61 families.
