= Baghcheh Misheh =

Village in West Azerbaijan province, Iran

Baghcheh Misheh Persian: باغچه ميشه
- Village
- Location within Iran
- Coordinates: 36°29′02″N 46°45′55″E
- Country: Iran
- Province: West Azerbaijan
- County: Shahin Dezh
- District: Central
- Rural District: Safa Khaneh

Population (2016)
  - Total: 262
- Time zone: UTC+3:30 (IRST)

Baghcheh Misheh (Persian: باغچه ميشه) (Note: Also romanized as Bāghcheh Mīsheh) is a village in Safa Khaneh Rural District of the Central District in Shahin Dezh County, West Azerbaijan province, Iran.

== Demographics ==
=== Population ===
At the time of the 2006 National Census, the village's population was 321 in 63 households. The following census in 2011 counted 260 people in 58 households. The 2016 census measured the population of the village as 262 people in 66 households.
