= Khazai-ye Sofla =

Khazai-ye Sofla خزائي سفلي
- Village
- Location within Iran
- Coordinates: 36°33′19″N 46°48′03″E
- Country: Iran
- Province: West Azerbaijan
- County: Shahin Dezh
- Bakhsh: Central
- Rural District: Hulasu

Population (2006)
  - Total: 92
- Time zone: UTC+3:30 (IRST)
  - Summer (DST): UTC+4:30 (IRDT)

Khazai-ye Sofla (Persian: خزائي سفلي, also Romanized as Khazā’ī-ye Soflá) is a village in Hulasu Rural District, in the Central District of Shahin Dezh County, West Azerbaijan Province, Iran. At the 2006 census, its population was 92, in 15 families.
