= Qezel Qayeh-ye Sofla =

Qezel Qayeh-ye Sofla قزل قيه سفلي
- Village
- Location within Iran
- Coordinates: 36°43′47″N 46°44′11″E
- Country: Iran
- Province: West Azerbaijan
- County: Shahin Dezh
- Bakhsh: Central
- Rural District: Hulasu

Population (2006)
  - Total: 241
- Time zone: UTC+3:30 (IRST)
  - Summer (DST): UTC+4:30 (IRDT)

Qezel Qayeh-ye Sofla (Persian: قزل قيه سفلي, also Romanized as Qezel Qayeh-ye Soflá) is a village in Hulasu Rural District, in the Central District of Shahin Dezh County, West Azerbaijan Province, Iran. At the 2006 census, its population was 241, in 48 families.
