= Sarujeh =

Sarujeh (Persian: ساروجه) may refer to:

- Sarujeh, East Azerbaijan
- Sarujeh, Razavi Khorasan
- Sarujeh-ye Olya, West Azerbaijan Province
- Sarujeh-ye Sofla, West Azerbaijan Province
