= Safa Khaneh =

Village in West Azerbaijan province, Iran

Safa Khaneh Persian: صفاخانه
- Village
- Location within Iran
- Coordinates: 36°26′27″N 46°41′22″E
- Country: Iran
- Province: West Azerbaijan
- County: Shahin Dezh
- District: Central
- Rural District: Safa Khaneh

Population (2016)
  - Total: 1,129
- Time zone: UTC+3:30 (IRST)

Safa Khaneh (Persian: صفاخانه) (Note: Also romanized as Şafā Khāneh) is a village in, and the capital of, Safa Khaneh Rural District in the Central District of Shahin Dezh County, West Azerbaijan province, Iran.

== Demographics ==
=== Population ===
At the time of the 2006 National Census, the village's population was 1,356 in 266 households. The following census in 2011 counted 1,309 people in 298 households. The 2016 census measured the population of the village as 1,129 people in 323 households.
