= Hachasu =

Village in West Azerbaijan province, Iran

Hachasu Persian: هاچاسو
- Village
- Location within Iran
- Coordinates: 36°40′51″N 46°37′19″E
- Country: Iran
- Province: West Azerbaijan
- County: Shahin Dezh
- District: Central
- Rural District: Hulasu

Population (2016)
  - Total: 1,416
- Time zone: UTC+3:30 (IRST)

Hachasu (Persian: هاچاسو) (Note: Also romanized as Hāchāsū; also known as Hācheh Sū and Hāchehsū) is a village in Hulasu Rural District of the Central District in Shahin Dezh County, West Azerbaijan province, Iran.

== Demographics ==
=== Population ===
At the time of the 2006 National Census, the village's population was 1,522 in 399 households. The following census in 2011 counted 1,655 people in 464 households. The 2016 census measured the population of the village as 1,416 people in 462 households. It was the most populous village in its rural district.
