= Khazai-ye Olya =

Khazai-ye Olya خزايي عليا
- Village
- Location within Iran
- Coordinates: 36°32′30″N 46°48′58″E
- Country: Iran
- Province: West Azerbaijan
- County: Shahin Dezh
- Bakhsh: Central
- Rural District: Hulasu

Population (2006)
  - Total: 279
- Time zone: UTC+3:30 (IRST)
  - Summer (DST): UTC+4:30 (IRDT)

Khazai-ye Olya (Persian: خزايي عليا, also Romanized as Khazā’ī-ye ‘Olyā) is a village in Hulasu Rural District, in the Central District of Shahin Dezh County, West Azerbaijan Province, Iran. At the 2006 census, its population was 279, in 46 families.
