= Sanjud =

Village in West Azerbaijan province, Iran

Sanjud Persian: سانجود
- Village
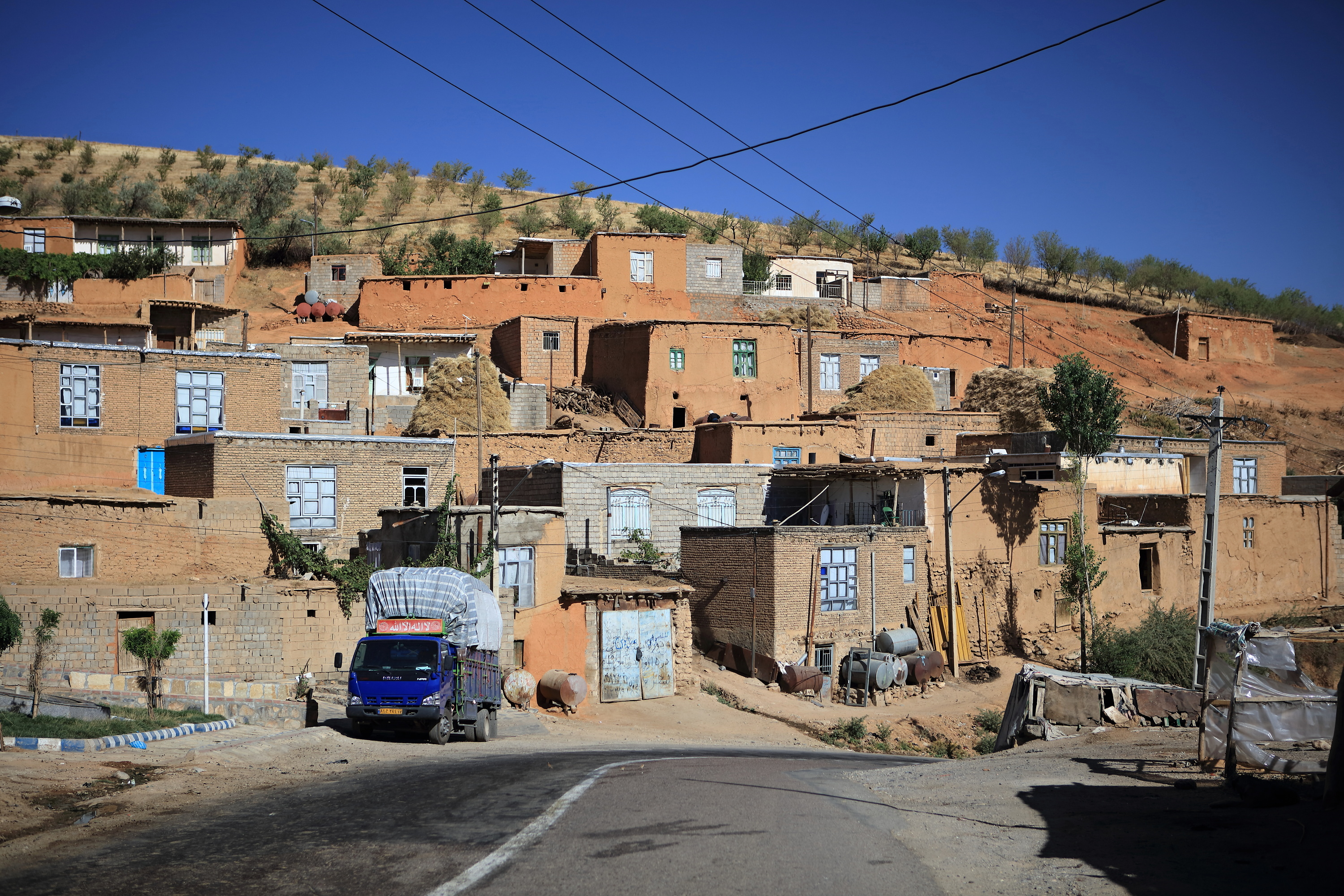

- Location within Iran
- Coordinates: 36°30′48″N 46°41′52″E
- Country: Iran
- Province: West Azerbaijan
- County: Shahin Dezh
- District: Central
- Rural District: Safa Khaneh

Population (2016)
  - Total: 316
- Time zone: UTC+3:30 (IRST)

Sanjud (Persian: سانجود) (Note: Also romanized as Sānjūd; also known as Sāyenjūd) is a village in Safa Khaneh Rural District of the Central District in Shahin Dezh County, West Azerbaijan province, Iran.

== Demographics ==
=== Population ===
At the time of the 2006 National Census, the village's population was 444 in 100 households. The following census in 2011 counted 404 people in 97 households. The 2016 census measured the population of the village as 316 people in 92 households.
