= Qezel Qayeh-ye Olya =

Qezel Qayeh-ye Olya قزل قيه عليا
- Village
- Location within Iran
- Coordinates: 36°42′57″N 46°46′13″E
- Country: Iran
- Province: West Azerbaijan
- County: Shahin Dezh
- Bakhsh: Central
- Rural District: Hulasu

Population (2006)
  - Total: 194
- Time zone: UTC+3:30 (IRST)
  - Summer (DST): UTC+4:30 (IRDT)

Qezel Qayeh-ye Olya (Persian: قزل قيه عليا, also Romanized as Qezel Qayeh-ye ‘Olyā) is a village in Hulasu Rural District, in the Central District of Shahin Dezh County, West Azerbaijan Province, Iran. At the 2006 census, its population was 194, in 34 families.
