= Mahmudabad-e Olya, West Azerbaijan =

Village in West Azerbaijan province, Iran

Mahmudabad-e Olya Persian: محمودابادعليا
- Village
- Location within Iran
- Coordinates: 36°33′01″N 46°40′45″E
- Country: Iran
- Province: West Azerbaijan
- County: Shahin Dezh
- District: Central
- Rural District: Hulasu

Population (2016)
  - Total: 311
- Time zone: UTC+3:30 (IRST)

Mahmudabad-e Olya (Persian: محمودابادعليا) (Note: Also romanized as Maḩmūdābād-e ‘Olyā; also known as Maḩmūdābād and Maḩmūdābād-e Jadīd) is a village in Hulasu Rural District of the Central District in Shahin Dezh County, West Azerbaijan province, Iran.

== Demographics ==
=== Population ===
At the time of the 2006 National Census, the village's population was 321 in 71 households. The following census in 2011 counted 300 people in 74 households. The 2016 census measured the population of the village as 311 people in 97 households.
