= Jushatuy-e Sofla =

Jushatuy-e Sofla جوشاتوي سفلي
- Village
- Location within Iran
- Coordinates: 36°44′33″N 46°33′53″E
- Country: Iran
- Province: West Azerbaijan
- County: Shahin Dezh
- Bakhsh: Central
- Rural District: Mahmudabad

Population (2006)
  - Total: 218
- Time zone: UTC+3:30 (IRST)
  - Summer (DST): UTC+4:30 (IRDT)

Jushatuy-e Sofla (Persian: جوشاتوي سفلي, also Romanized as Jūshātūy-e Soflá; also known as Jūshātū-ye Soflá) is a village in Mahmudabad Rural District, in the Central District of Shahin Dezh County, West Azerbaijan Province, Iran. At the 2006 census, its population was 218, in 50 families.
