= Yengi Orkh-e Niki =

Village in West Azerbaijan province, Iran

Yengi Orkh-e Niki Persian: ینگی‌ارخ نیکی
- Village
- Location within Iran
- Coordinates: 36°45′24″N 46°27′17″E
- Country: Iran
- Province: West Azerbaijan
- County: Shahin Dezh
- District: Central
- Rural District: Mahmudabad

Population (2016)
  - Total: 331
- Time zone: UTC+3:30 (IRST)

Yengi Orkh-e Niki (Persian: ینگی‌ارخ نیکی) (Note: Also romanized as Yengī Orkh-e Nīkī; formerly known as Yengi Orkh (ينگي ارخ), also romanized as Yengī Orkh; also known as Yengī Ūkh) is a village in Mahmudabad Rural District of the Central District in Shahin Dezh County, West Azerbaijan province, Iran.

== Demographics ==
=== Population ===
At the time of the 2006 National Census, the village's population, as Yengi Orkh, was 376 in 93 households. The following census in 2011 counted 384 people in 96 households, by which time the village was listed as Yengi Orkh-e Niki. The 2016 census measured the population of the village as 331 people in 96 households.
