= Aghajari, West Azerbaijan =

Village in West Azerbaijan province, Iran

Aghajari Persian: اغاجاري
- Village
- Location within Iran
- Coordinates: 36°34′38″N 46°36′51″E
- Country: Iran
- Province: West Azerbaijan
- County: Shahin Dezh
- District: Central
- Rural District: Hulasu

Population (2016)
  - Total: 413
- Time zone: UTC+3:30 (IRST)

Aghajari (Persian: اغاجاري) (Note: Also romanized as Āghājarī; also known as Āqājārī) is a village in Hulasu Rural District of the Central District in Shahin Dezh County, West Azerbaijan province, Iran.

== Demographics ==
=== Population ===
At the time of the 2006 National Census, the village's population was 494 in 98 households. The following census in 2011 counted 367 people in 92 households. The 2016 census measured the population of the village as 413 people in 107 households.
