= Mamalu =

Village in West Azerbaijan province, Iran

Mamalu Persian: مامالو
- Village
- Location within Iran
- Coordinates: 36°42′48″N 46°38′15″E
- Country: Iran
- Province: West Azerbaijan
- County: Shahin Dezh
- District: Central
- Rural District: Hulasu

Population (2016)
  - Total: 755
- Time zone: UTC+3:30 (IRST)

Mamalu (Persian: مامالو) (Note: Also romanized as Māmālū) is a village in Hulasu Rural District of the Central District in Shahin Dezh County, West Azerbaijan province, Iran.

== Demographics ==
=== Population ===
At the time of the 2006 National Census, the village's population was 769 in 173 households. The following census in 2011 counted 795 people in 212 households. The 2016 census measured the population of the village as 755 people in 218 households.
