= Hasanlu, Shahin Dezh =

Village in West Azerbaijan province, Iran

Hasanlu Persian: حسنلو
- Village
- Location within Iran
- Coordinates: 36°32′11″N 46°40′15″E
- Country: Iran
- Province: West Azerbaijan
- County: Shahin Dezh
- District: Central
- Rural District: Safa Khaneh

Population (2016)
  - Total: 372
- Time zone: UTC+3:30 (IRST)

Hasanlu (Persian: حسنلو) (Note: Also romanized as Ḩasanlū) is a village in Safa Khaneh Rural District of the Central District in Shahin Dezh County, West Azerbaijan province, Iran.

== Demographics ==
=== Population ===
At the time of the 2006 National Census, the village's population was 506 in 98 households. The following census in 2011 counted 409 people in 98 households. The 2016 census measured the population of the village as 372 people in 117 households.
