= Qiz Korpi =

Village in West Azerbaijan province, Iran

Qiz Korpi Persian: قيزكرپي
- Village
- Location within Iran
- Coordinates: 36°36′50″N 46°33′15″E
- Country: Iran
- Province: West Azerbaijan
- County: Shahin Dezh
- District: Central
- Rural District: Hulasu

Population (2016)
  - Total: 594
- Time zone: UTC+3:30 (IRST)

Qiz Korpi (Persian: قيزكرپي) (Note: Also romanized as Qīz Korpī; also known as Qez Korpī, Qez Kowrpī, and Qezel Korpī) is a village in Hulasu Rural District of the Central District in Shahin Dezh County, West Azerbaijan province, Iran.

== Demographics ==
=== Population ===
At the time of the 2006 National Census, the village's population was 643 in 141 households. The following census in 2011 counted 585 people in 143 households. The 2016 census measured the population of the village as 594 people in 186 households.
