= Manbar =

Village in West Azerbaijan province, Iran

Manbar Persian: منبر
- Village
- Location within Iran
- Coordinates: 36°35′49″N 46°44′59″E
- Country: Iran
- Province: West Azerbaijan
- County: Shahin Dezh
- District: Central
- Rural District: Hulasu

Population (2016)
  - Total: 412
- Time zone: UTC+3:30 (IRST)

Manbar (Persian: منبر) is a village in Hulasu Rural District of the Central District in Shahin Dezh County, West Azerbaijan province, Iran.

== Demographics ==
=== Population ===
At the time of the 2006 National Census, the village's population was 625 in 122 households. The following census in 2011 counted 526 people in 114 households. The 2016 census measured the population of the village as 412 people in 110 households.
