= Qezel Qayeh-ye Vosta =

Qezel Qayeh-ye Vosta قزل قيه وسطي
- Village
- Location within Iran
- Coordinates: 36°43′42″N 46°45′28″E
- Country: Iran
- Province: West Azerbaijan
- County: Shahin Dezh
- Bakhsh: Central
- Rural District: Hulasu

Population (2006)
  - Total: 203
- Time zone: UTC+3:30 (IRST)
  - Summer (DST): UTC+4:30 (IRDT)

Qezel Qayeh-ye Vosta (Persian: قزل قيه وسطي, also Romanized as Qezel Qayeh-ye Vosţá) is a village in Hulasu Rural District, in the Central District of Shahin Dezh County, West Azerbaijan Province, Iran. As of the 2006 census, its population was 203, with there being 36 families.
