= Guzal Bolagh =

Village in West Azerbaijan province, Iran

Guzal Bolagh Persian: گوزل بلاغ
- Village
- Location within Iran
- Coordinates: 36°26′32″N 46°39′36″E
- Country: Iran
- Province: West Azerbaijan
- County: Shahin Dezh
- District: Central
- Rural District: Safa Khaneh

Population (2016)
  - Total: 500
- Time zone: UTC+3:30 (IRST)

Guzal Bolagh (Persian: گوزل بلاغ) (Note: Also romanized as Gūzal Bolāgh) is a village in Safa Khaneh Rural District of the Central District in Shahin Dezh County, West Azerbaijan province, Iran.

== Demographics ==
=== Population ===
At the time of the 2006 National Census, the village's population was 667 in 136 households. The following census in 2011 counted 553 people in 130 households. The 2016 census measured the population of the village as 500 people in 138 households.
