= Qarah Tappeh, Shahin Dezh =

Village in West Azerbaijan province, Iran

Qarah Tappeh Persian: قره تپه
- Village
- Location within Iran
- Coordinates: 36°46′34″N 46°31′19″E
- Country: Iran
- Province: West Azerbaijan
- County: Shahin Dezh
- District: Central
- Rural District: Mahmudabad

Population (2016)
  - Total: 413
- Time zone: UTC+3:30 (IRST)

Qarah Tappeh (Persian: قره‌تپه) (Note: Also romanized as Qareh Tappeh) is a village in Mahmudabad Rural District of the Central District in Shahin Dezh County, West Azerbaijan province, Iran.

== Demographics ==
=== Population ===
At the time of the 2006 National Census, the village's population was 531 in 137 households. The following census in 2011 counted 519 people in 156 households. The 2016 census measured the population of the village as 413 people in 129 households.
