= Hesar, Shahin Dezh =

Village in West Azerbaijan province, Iran

Hesar Persian: حصار
- Village
- Location within Iran
- Coordinates: 36°27′32″N 46°45′07″E
- Country: Iran
- Province: West Azerbaijan
- County: Shahin Dezh
- District: Central
- Rural District: Safa Khaneh

Population (2016)
  - Total: 377
- Time zone: UTC+3:30 (IRST)

Hesar (Persian: حصار) (Note: Also romanized as Ḩeşār) is a village in Safa Khaneh Rural District of the Central District in Shahin Dezh County, West Azerbaijan province, Iran.

== Demographics ==
=== Population ===
At the time of the 2006 National Census, the village's population was 402 in 78 households. The following census in 2011 counted 402 people in 106 households. The 2016 census measured the population of the village as 377 people in 107 households.
