= Aq Tappeh, West Azerbaijan =

Village in West Azerbaijan province, Iran

Aq Tappeh Persian: اق تپه
- Village
- Location within Iran
- Coordinates: 36°40′00″N 46°32′17″E
- Country: Iran
- Province: West Azerbaijan
- County: Shahin Dezh
- District: Central
- Rural District: Mahmudabad

Population (2016)
  - Total: 1,267
- Time zone: UTC+3:30 (IRST)

Aq Tappeh (Persian: اق تپه) (Note: Also romanized as Āq Tappeh and Āqtappeh) is a village in Mahmudabad Rural District of the Central District in Shahin Dezh County, West Azerbaijan province, Iran.

== Demographics ==
=== Population ===
At the time of the 2006 National Census, the village's population was 841 in 182 households. The following census in 2011 counted 1,071 people in 278 households. The 2016 census measured the population of the village as 1,267 people in 359 households. It was the most populous village in its rural district.
