= Qeshlaq-e Bakhtiar, West Azerbaijan =

Village in West Azerbaijan province, Iran

Qeshlaq-e Bakhtiar Persian: قشلاق بختيار
- Village
- Location within Iran
- Coordinates: 36°44′31″N 46°33′53″E
- Country: Iran
- Province: West Azerbaijan
- County: Shahin Dezh
- District: Central
- Rural District: Mahmudabad

Population (2016)
  - Total: 388
- Time zone: UTC+3:30 (IRST)

Qeshlaq-e Bakhtiar (Persian: قشلاق بختيار) (Note: Also romanized as Qeshlāq-e Bakhtīār) is a village in Mahmudabad Rural District of the Central District in Shahin Dezh County, West Azerbaijan province, Iran.

== Demographics ==
=== Population ===
At the time of the 2006 National Census, the village's population was 420 in 90 households. The following census in 2011 counted 403 people in 105 households. The 2016 census measured the population of the village as 388 people in 124 households.
