= Yurqunabad =

Yurqunabad (Persian: يورقون اباد) may refer to:

- Yurqunabad-e Olya
- Yurqunabad-e Sofla
