= Yengiabad-e Niki =

Village in West Azerbaijan province, Iran

Yengiabad-e Niki Persian: ينگي آباد-نيكي
- Village
- Location within Iran
- Coordinates: 36°44′07″N 46°29′32″E
- Country: Iran
- Province: West Azerbaijan
- County: Shahin Dezh
- District: Central
- Rural District: Mahmudabad

Population (2016)
  - Total: 851
- Time zone: UTC+3:30 (IRST)

Yengiabad-e Niki (Persian: ينگي آباد-نيكي) (Note: Also romanized as Yengīābād-e Nīkī; formerly known as Yengiabad (ينگي اباد), also romanized as Yengīābād) is a village in Mahmudabad Rural District of the Central District in Shahin Dezh County, West Azerbaijan province, Iran.

== Demographics ==
=== Population ===
At the time of the 2006 National Census, the village's population, as Yengiabad, was 774 in 182 households. The following census in 2011 counted 821 people in 243 households, by which time the village was listed as Yengiabad-e Niki. The 2016 census measured the population of the village as 851 people in 262 households.
