= Jushatuy =

Jushatuy (Persian: جوشاتوي), also rendered as Jushatu, may refer to:

- Jushatuy-e Olya
- Jushatuy-e Sofla
