= Sarujeh-ye Olya =

Village in West Azerbaijan province, Iran

Sarujeh-ye Olya Persian: ساروجه عليا
- Village
- Location within Iran
- Coordinates: 36°39′10″N 46°30′14″E
- Country: Iran
- Province: West Azerbaijan
- County: Shahin Dezh
- District: Central
- Rural District: Mahmudabad

Population (2016)
  - Total: 519
- Time zone: UTC+3:30 (IRST)

Sarujeh-ye Olya (Persian: ساروجه عليا) (Note: Also romanized as Sārūjeh-ye ‘Olyā) is a village in Mahmudabad Rural District of the Central District in Shahin Dezh County, West Azerbaijan province, Iran.

== Demographics ==
=== Population ===
At the time of the 2006 National Census, the village's population was 571 in 101 households. The following census in 2011 counted 541 people in 123 households. The 2016 census measured the population of the village as 519 people in 135 households.
