= Qezel Darreh =

Qezel Darreh or Qezeldarreh (Persian: قزل دره) may refer to:

- Qezel Darreh, Ardabil
- Qezel Darreh, East Azerbaijan
- Qezel Darreh, Kermanshah
- Qezel Darreh, Qazvin
- Qezel Darreh, Zanjan
