= Karkareh =

Karkareh or Karkarreh or Kerkereh (Persian: كركره) may refer to:

- Karkareh, Kermanshah
- Kerkereh, West Azerbaijan
