= Chichaklu, Shahin Dezh =

Village in West Azerbaijan province, Iran

Chichaklu Persian: چيچكلو
- Village
- Location within Iran
- Coordinates: 36°44′47″N 46°28′38″E
- Country: Iran
- Province: West Azerbaijan
- County: Shahin Dezh
- District: Central
- Rural District: Mahmudabad

Population (2016)
  - Total: 436
- Time zone: UTC+3:30 (IRST)

Chichaklu (Persian: چيچكلو) (Note: Also romanized as Chīchaklū; also known as Chechaglū, Chechak Lū, Chīchakātū, and Chīchiklu) is a village in Mahmudabad Rural District of the Central District in Shahin Dezh County, West Azerbaijan province, Iran.

== Demographics ==
=== Population ===
At the time of the 2006 National Census, the village's population was 411 in 100 households. The following census in 2011 counted 450 people in 119 households. The 2016 census measured the population of the village as 436 people in 127 households.
