= Isaluy =

Isaluy (Persian: عيسي لوي) may refer to:

- Isaluy-e Heydarlu
- Isaluy-e Zemi
