= Yengiabad =

Yengiabad (Persian: ينگي اباد) may refer to:

- Yengiabad-e Chai, East Azerbaijan
- Yengiabad, Kurdistan
- Yengiabad, West Azerbaijan
- Yengiabad, Zanjan
