= Khazai =

Khazai (Persian: خزايي) may refer to:

- Khazai-ye Olya
- Khazai-ye Sofla
