= Isaluy-e Heydarlu =

Isaluy-e Heydarlu عیسی‌لوی حیدرلو
- Village
- Location within Iran
- Coordinates: 37°40′53″N 45°05′28″E
- Country: Iran
- Province: West Azerbaijan
- County: Urmia
- Bakhsh: Central
- Rural District: Bash Qaleh

Population (2006)
  - Total: 92
- Time zone: UTC+3:30 (IRST)
  - Summer (DST): UTC+4:30 (IRDT)

Isaluy-e Heydarlu (Persian: عیسی‌لوی حیدرلو, also Romanized as ‘Īsálūy-e Ḩeydarlū; also known as ‘Īsálū-ye Ḩeydarlū) is a village in Bash Qaleh Rural District, in the Central District of Urmia County, West Azerbaijan Province, Iran. At the 2006 census, its population was 92 with 26 families.
