= Chichagluy-e Mansur =

Chichagluy-e Mansur چیچگلوی منصور
- Village
- Location within Iran
- Coordinates: 37°37′27″N 45°07′38″E
- Country: Iran
- Province: West Azerbaijan
- County: Urmia
- Bakhsh: Central
- Rural District: Bash Qaleh

Population (2006)
  - Total: 264
- Time zone: UTC+3:30 (IRST)
  - Summer (DST): UTC+4:30 (IRDT)

Chichagluy-e Mansur (Persian: چیچگلوی منصور, also Romanized as Chīchaglūy-e Manşūr; also known as Chīchaklū-ye Manşūr) is a village in Bash Qaleh Rural District, in the Central District of Urmia County, West Azerbaijan Province, Iran. At the 2006 census, its population was 264, in 66 families.
