= Tupraq Qaleh =

Village in West Azerbaijan province, Iran

Tupraq Qaleh Persian: توپراق‌قلعه
- Village
- Location within Iran
- Coordinates: 37°35′13″N 45°05′25″E
- Country: Iran
- Province: West Azerbaijan
- County: Urmia
- District: Central
- Rural District: Bash Qaleh

Population (2016)
  - Total: 2,467
- Time zone: UTC+3:30 (IRST)

Tupraq Qaleh (Persian: توپراق‌قلعه) (Note: Also romanized as Towprāq Qal‘eh and Tūprāq Qal‘eh) is a village in Bash Qaleh Rural District of the Central District in Urmia County, West Azerbaijan province, Iran.

== Demographics ==
=== Population ===
At the time of the 2006 National Census, the village's population was 1,831 in 476 households. The following census in 2011 counted 2,131 people in 628 households. The 2016 census measured the population of the village as 2,467 people in 741 households. It was the most populous village in its rural district.
