= Isaluy-e Zemi =

Isaluy-e Zemi عیسی‌لوی زمی
- Village
- Location within Iran
- Coordinates: 37°41′01″N 45°06′32″E
- Country: Iran
- Province: West Azerbaijan
- County: Urmia
- Bakhsh: Central
- Rural District: Bash Qaleh

Population (2006)
  - Total: 75
- Time zone: UTC+3:30 (IRST)
  - Summer (DST): UTC+4:30 (IRDT)

Isaluy-e Zemi (Persian: عیسی‌لوی زمی, also Romanized as ‘Īsálūy-e Zemī; also known as ‘Īsálū-ye Z̄emī) is a village in Bash Qaleh Rural District, in the Central District of Urmia County, West Azerbaijan Province, Iran. At the 2006 census, its population was 75, in 24 families.
