= Qaleh-ye Azizbeyg =

Village in West Azerbaijan province, Iran

Qaleh-ye Azizbeyg Persian: قلعه عزيزبيگ
- Village
- Location within Iran
- Coordinates: 37°41′00″N 45°07′30″E
- Country: Iran
- Province: West Azerbaijan
- County: Urmia
- District: Central
- Rural District: Bash Qaleh

Population (2016)
  - Total: 330
- Time zone: UTC+3:30 (IRST)

Qaleh-ye Azizbeyg (Persian: قلعه عزيزبيگ) (Note: Also romanized as Qal‘eh-ye ‘Azīzbeyg; also known as Qal‘eh-ye ‘Azīz) is a village in Bash Qaleh Rural District of the Central District in Urmia County, West Azerbaijan province, Iran.

== Demographics ==
=== Population ===
At the time of the 2006 National Census, the village's population was 290 in 70 households. The following census in 2011 counted 276 people in 89 households. The 2016 census measured the population of the village as 330 people in 102 households.
