= Golmarz-e Olya =

Village in West Azerbaijan province, Iran

Golmarz-e Olya Persian: گلمرز عليا
- Village
- Location within Iran
- Coordinates: 37°35′55″N 45°07′00″E
- Country: Iran
- Province: West Azerbaijan
- County: Urmia
- District: Central
- Rural District: Bash Qaleh

Population (2016)
  - Total: 430
- Time zone: UTC+3:30 (IRST)

Golmarz-e Olya (Persian: گلمرز عليا) (Note: Also romanized as Golmarz-e ‘Olyā; formerly known as Shahrak-e Golmarz (شهرک گلمرز); also known as Golmarz) is a village in Bash Qaleh Rural District of the Central District in Urmia County, West Azerbaijan province, Iran.

== Demographics ==
=== Population ===
At the time of the 2006 National Census, the village's population, as Shahrak-e Golmarz, was 483 in 131 households. The following census in 2011 counted 295 people in 105 households, by which time the village was listed as Golmarz-e Olya. The 2016 census measured the population of the village as 430 people in 138 households.
