= Takalu =

Village in West Azerbaijan province, Iran

Takalu Persian: تكالو
- Village
- Location within Iran
- Coordinates: 37°35′38″N 45°06′21″E
- Country: Iran
- Province: West Azerbaijan
- County: Urmia
- District: Central
- Rural District: Bash Qaleh

Population (2016)
  - Total: 324
- Time zone: UTC+3:30 (IRST)

Takalu (Persian: تكالو) (Note: Also romanized as Takālū; in Armenian: Թաքալու) is a village in Bash Qaleh Rural District of the Central District in Urmia County, West Azerbaijan province, Iran.

== Demographics ==
=== Population ===
At the time of the 2006 National Census, the village's population was 298 in 79 households. The following census in 2011 counted 295 people in 88 households. The 2016 census measured the population of the village as 324 people in 104 households.
