= Mastanabad =

Mastanabad (Persian: مستان اباد) may refer to:

- Mastanabad, Ardabil
- Mastanabad, West Azerbaijan
