= Shur Kand =

Village in West Azerbaijan province, Iran

Shur Kand Persian: شوركند
- Village
- Location within Iran
- Coordinates: 37°36′59″N 45°05′51″E
- Country: Iran
- Province: West Azerbaijan
- County: Urmia
- District: Central
- Rural District: Bash Qaleh

Population (2016)
  - Total: 406
- Time zone: UTC+3:30 (IRST)

Shur Kand (Persian: شوركند) (Note: Also romanized as Shūr Kand) is a village in Bash Qaleh Rural District of the Central District in Urmia County, West Azerbaijan province, Iran.

== Demographics ==
=== Population ===
At the time of the 2006 National Census, the village's population was 347 in 89 households. The following census in 2011 counted 325 people in 106 households. The 2016 census measured the population of the village as 406 people in 133 households.
