= Yurqunabad-e Sofla =

Yurqunabad-e Sofla یورقون‌آباد سفلی
- Village
- Location within Iran
- Coordinates: 37°40′52″N 45°08′51″E
- Country: Iran
- Province: West Azerbaijan
- County: Urmia
- Bakhsh: Central
- Rural District: Bash Qaleh

Population (2006)
  - Total: 195
- Time zone: UTC+3:30 (IRST)
  - Summer (DST): UTC+4:30 (IRDT)

Yurqunabad-e Sofla (Persian: یورقون‌آباد سفلی, also Romanized as Yūrqūnābād-e Soflá) is a village in Bash Qaleh Rural District, in the Central District of Urmia County, West Azerbaijan Province, Iran. At the 2006 census, its population was 195, in 44 families.
