= Kechah Bash =

Village in West Azerbaijan province, Iran

Kechah Bash Persian: كچه باش
- Village
- Location within Iran
- Coordinates: 37°37′12″N 45°08′55″E
- Country: Iran
- Province: West Azerbaijan
- County: Urmia
- District: Central
- Rural District: Bash Qaleh

Population (2016)
  - Total: 533
- Time zone: UTC+3:30 (IRST)

Kechah Bash (Persian: كچه باش) (Note: Also romanized as Kechah Bāsh) is a village in Bash Qaleh Rural District of the Central District in Urmia County, West Azerbaijan province, Iran.

== Demographics ==
=== Population ===
At the time of the 2006 National Census, the village's population was 401 in 119 households. The following census in 2011 counted 428 people in 138 households. The 2016 census measured the population of the village as 533 people in 164 households.
