= Qarabqolu =

Village in West Azerbaijan province, Iran

Qarabqolu Persian: قرابقلو
- Village
- Location within Iran
- Coordinates: 37°42′12″N 45°08′27″E
- Country: Iran
- Province: West Azerbaijan
- County: Urmia
- District: Central
- Rural District: Bash Qaleh

Population (2016)
  - Total: 368
- Time zone: UTC+3:30 (IRST)

Qarabqolu (Persian: قرابقلو) (Note: Also romanized as Qarābqolū; also known as Qarābgholū and Qarāblū) is a village in Bash Qaleh Rural District of the Central District in Urmia County, West Azerbaijan province, Iran.

== Demographics ==
=== Population ===
At the time of the 2006 National Census, the village's population was 591 in 168 households. The following census in 2011 counted 425 people in 127 households. The 2016 census measured the population of the village as 368 people in 122 households.
