= Qosur =

Village in West Azerbaijan province, Iran

Qosur Persian: قصور
- Village
- Location within Iran
- Coordinates: 37°36′25″N 45°04′47″E
- Country: Iran
- Province: West Azerbaijan
- County: Urmia
- District: Central
- Rural District: Bash Qaleh

Population (2016)
  - Total: 639
- Time zone: UTC+3:30 (IRST)

Qosur (Persian: قصور) (Note: Also romanized as Qoşūr) is a village in Bash Qaleh Rural District of the Central District in Urmia County, West Azerbaijan province, Iran.

== Demographics ==
=== Population ===
At the time of the 2006 National Census, the village's population was 353 in 81 households. The following census in 2011 counted 524 people in 148 households. The 2016 census measured the population of the village as 639 people in 191 households.
