= Mahmudabad, West Azerbaijan =

City in West Azerbaijan province, Iran

Mahmudabad Persian: محمودآباد
- City
- Location within Iran
- Coordinates: 36°43′02″N 46°31′01″E
- Country: Iran
- Province: West Azerbaijan
- County: Shahin Dezh
- District: Central
- Established as a city: 2005

Population (2016)
  - Total: 6,866
- Time zone: UTC+3:30 (IRST)

Mahmudabad (Persian: محمودآباد) (Note: Also romanized as Maḩmūdābād; formerly known as Maḩmūdābād-e Jīq) is a city in the Central District of Shahin Dezh County, West Azerbaijan province, Iran, serving as the administrative center for Mahmudabad Rural District. The village of Mahmudabad-e Jiq was converted to a city in 2005.

== Demographics ==
=== Population ===
At the time of the 2006 National Census, the city's population was 5,817 in 1,507 households. The following census in 2011 counted 6,680 people in 1,835 households. The 2016 census measured the population of the city as 6,866 people in 2,135 households.
