= Shahin Dezh =

City in West Azerbaijan province, Iran

Shahin Dezh Persian: شاهين‌دژ
- City
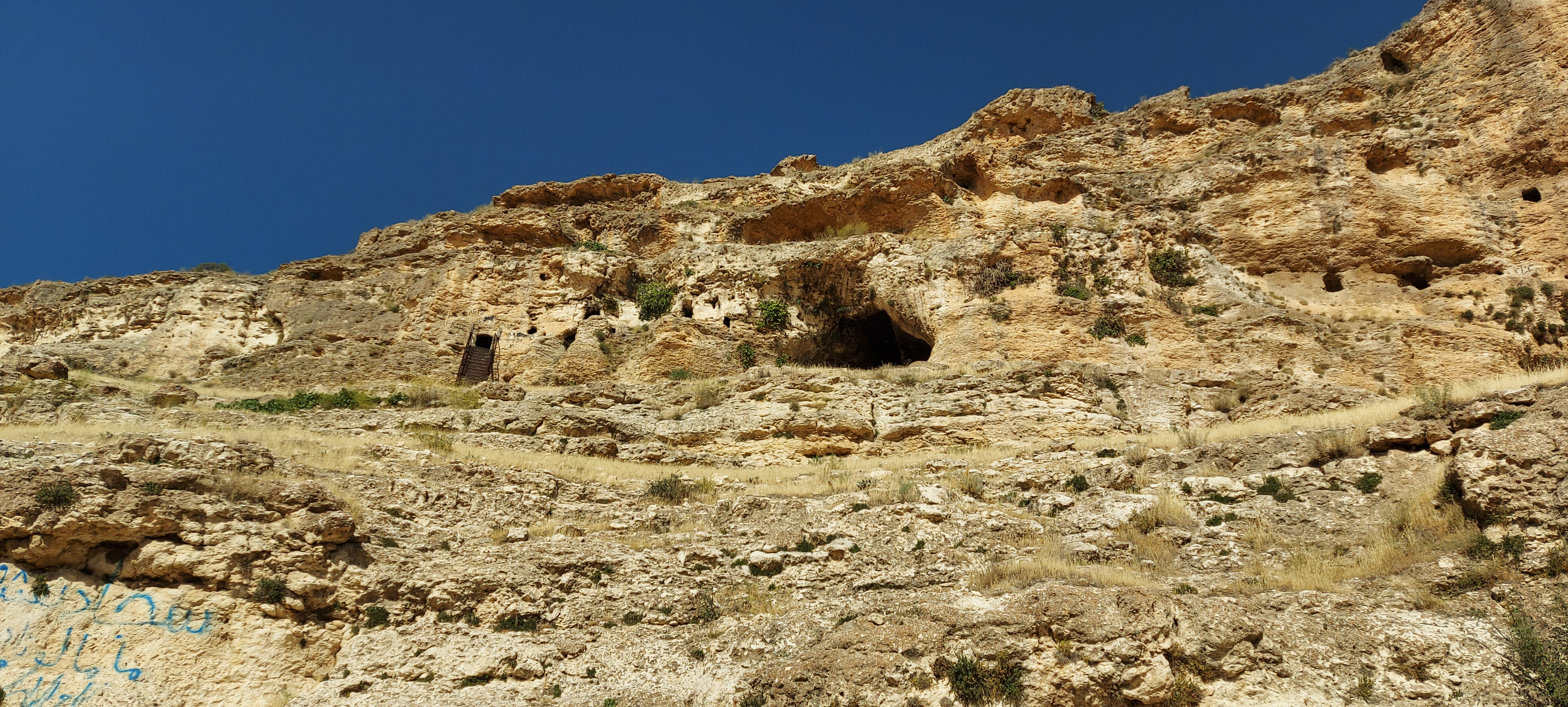
- General view of Bibi Kand rock complex

- Location within Iran
- Coordinates: 36°40′50″N 46°34′05″E
- Country: Iran
- Province: West Azerbaijan
- County: Shahin Dezh
- District: Central

Population (2016)
  - Total: 43,131
- Time zone: UTC+3:30 (IRST)

Shahin Dezh (Persian: شاهين‌دژ) (Note: Also romanized as Shāhīn Dezh; also known as Sahin Dazh, Şā’īn Dezh, and Shahindej; formerly Sāīn Kala (صائین قالا) and Şā’īn Qal‘eh; Azerbaijani: سایین‌قالا; Kurdish: ساین قەڵا, romanized as Sayin Qella) is a city in the Central District of Shahin Dezh County, West Azerbaijan province, Iran, serving as capital of both the county and the district.

Shahin Dezh is about 1,300 meters in elevation. The city is on the Zarrineh River, southeast of Lake Urmia.

== History ==
The modern town of Shahin Dezh was formerly known as Ṣāʾīn Qal‘eh. The name Ṣāʾīn (also spelled Sāīn, Shahin, etcetera.) is derived from the Mongol sayin, which translates as "good".

The local Turkic Afshars were brought to the area from Shiraz at the beginning of the 19th century by Fath-Ali Shah Qajar (r. 1797–1834), the second Qajar shah ("king") of Iran. Later, a segment of these Afshars had to migrate to Urmia in order to make way for the Chardawri (Chardowli) Lurs. The chief of the Chardowli's resided at Mahmuddjik and was the commander of c. 5,000 men. In 1830, Ṣāʾīn Qal‘eh was sacked by Kurds led by Sheikh Ubeydullah. Ṣāʾīn Qal‘eh, being the site of an Iranian military garrison in the past, safeguarded the entrance to the Azerbaijan Province through the Zarrineh valley.

The ancient Karaftu Caves, first described by Robert Ker Porter (1777–1842), and the old site of Takht-e Soleyman were formerly located in the territory of the Afshars of Ṣāʾīn Qal‘eh. The lake of Chamli Göl, near the village of Badarli with its floating island were likewise well known at the time. Some of the Afshars of Ṣāʾīn Qal‘eh belonged to the Yarsanism sect.

The old site of Ṣāʾīn Qal‘eh is now occupied by the modern town of Shahin Dezh, which is also the chef-lieu of Shahin Dezh County. In c. 1950, its population was 3,170 which by 1991 had increased to 25,050.

The fortress of Ṣāʾīn Qal‘eh is sometimes confused with the similarly named fortress on the Abhar river to the east of Soltaniyeh, which was mentioned by Hamdallah Mustawfi (1281 – after 1339/40).

== Demographics ==
=== Population ===
At the time of the 2006 National Census, the city's population was 34,204 in 8,671 households. The following census in 2011 counted 38,396 people in 10,782 households. The 2016 census measured the population of the city as 43,131 people in 12,826 households.
