= Chichakluy-e Bash Qaleh =

Village in West Azerbaijan province, Iran

Chichakluy-e Bash Qaleh Persian: چيچكلوي باش قلعه
- Village
- Location within Iran
- Coordinates: 37°38′11″N 45°07′44″E
- Country: Iran
- Province: West Azerbaijan
- County: Urmia
- District: Central
- Rural District: Bash Qaleh

Population (2016)
  - Total: 324
- Time zone: UTC+3:30 (IRST)

Chichakluy-e Bash Qaleh (Persian: چيچكلوي باش قلعه) (Note: Also romanized as Chīchaklūy-e Bāsh Qal‘eh; also known as Chīchaklū-ye Baksh Qal‘eh and Chīchaklū-ye Bāsh Qal‘eh; in Armenian: Չիչեքլու) is a village in Bash Qaleh Rural District of the Central District in Urmia County, West Azerbaijan province, Iran.

== Demographics ==
=== Population ===
At the time of the 2006 National Census, the village's population was 438 in 118 households. The following census in 2011 counted 55 people in 14 households. The 2016 census measured the population of the village as 324 people in 95 households.
