= Yurqunabad-e Olya =

Village in West Azerbaijan province, Iran

Yurqunabad-e Olya Persian: یورقون‌آباد علیا
- Village
- Location within Iran
- Coordinates: 37°40′34″N 45°08′34″E
- Country: Iran
- Province: West Azerbaijan
- County: Urmia
- District: Central
- Rural District: Bash Qaleh

Population (2016)
  - Total: 418
- Time zone: UTC+3:30 (IRST)

Yurqunabad-e Olya (Persian: یورقون‌آباد علیا) (Note: Also romanized as Yūrqūnābād-e ‘Olyā) is a village in, and the capital of, Bash Qaleh Rural District in the Central District of Urmia County, West Azerbaijan province, Iran.

== Demographics ==
=== Population ===
At the time of the 2006 National Census, the village's population was 408 in 110 households. The following census in 2011 counted 287 people in 87 households. The 2016 census measured the population of the village as 418 people in 129 households.
