= Qezel Darreh, Kermanshah =

Qezel Darreh قزل دره
- Village
- Location within Iran
- Coordinates: 34°43′17″N 47°14′36″E
- Country: Iran
- Province: Kermanshah
- County: Sahneh
- Bakhsh: Dinavar
- Rural District: Horr

Population (2006)
  - Total: 64
- Time zone: UTC+3:30 (IRST)
  - Summer (DST): UTC+4:30 (IRDT)

Qezel Darreh (Persian: قزل دره, also Romanized as Qezeldarreh) is a village in Horr Rural District, Dinavar District, Sahneh County, Kermanshah Province, Iran. At the 2006 census, its population was 64, in 19 families.
