= Chichaklu, East Azerbaijan =

Chichaklu چيچكلو
- Village
- Location within Iran
- Coordinates: 37°46′43″N 47°21′51″E
- Country: Iran
- Province: East Azerbaijan
- County: Sarab
- Bakhsh: Central
- Rural District: Abarghan

Population (2006)
  - Total: 321
- Time zone: UTC+3:30 (IRST)
  - Summer (DST): UTC+4:30 (IRDT)

Chichaklu (Persian: چيچكلو, also Romanized as Chīchaklū; also known as Chechaklū and Chichiklu) is a village in Abarghan Rural District, in the Central District of Sarab County, East Azerbaijan Province, Iran. At the 2006 census, its population was 321, in 59 families.
