= Qezel Qayah, Sarab =

Qezel Qayah قزلقيه
- Village
- Location within Iran
- Coordinates: 38°03′49″N 47°35′57″E
- Country: Iran
- Province: East Azerbaijan
- County: Sarab
- Bakhsh: Central
- Rural District: Razliq

Population (2006)
  - Total: 66
- Time zone: UTC+3:30 (IRST)
  - Summer (DST): UTC+4:30 (IRDT)

Qezel Qayah (Persian: قزلقيه, also Romanized as Qezel Qayeh) is a village in Razliq Rural District, in the Central District of Sarab County, East Azerbaijan Province, Iran. At the 2006 census, its population was 66, in 13 families.
