= Safa Khaneh Rural District =

Rural district in West Azerbaijan province, Iran

Safa Khaneh Rural District Persian: دهستان صفاخانه
- Rural District
- Location within Iran
- Coordinates: 36°28′N 46°42′E
- Country: Iran
- Province: West Azerbaijan
- County: Shahin Dezh
- District: Central
- Established: 1987
- Capital: Safa Khaneh

Population (2016)
  - Total: 6,245
- Time zone: UTC+3:30 (IRST)

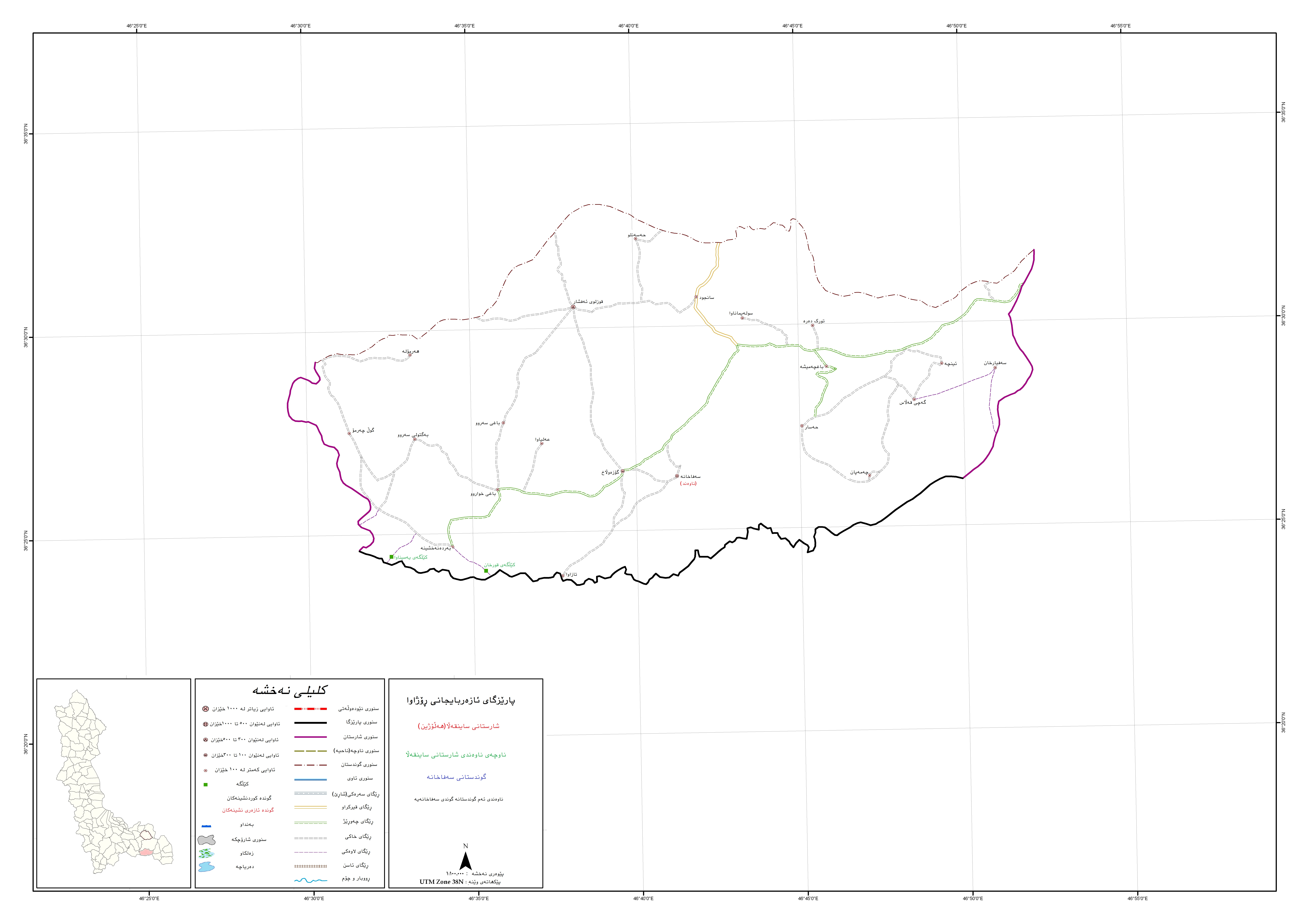
Map of Safa Khaneh Rural District

Safa Khaneh Rural District (Persian: دهستان صفاخانه) is in the Central District of Shahin Dezh County, West Azerbaijan province, Iran. Its capital is the village of Safa Khaneh.

== Demographics ==
=== Population ===
At the time of the 2006 National Census, the rural district's population was 7,970 in 1,575 households. There were 7,179 inhabitants in 1,659 households at the following census of 2011. The 2016 census measured the population of the rural district as 6,245 in 1,804 households. The most populous of its 24 villages was Quzluy-e Afshar, with 1,411 people.

=== Other villages in the rural district ===
- Baghcheh Misheh
- Golcharmu
- Guzal Bolagh
- Hasanlu
- Hesar
- Sanjud
- Soleymanabad
