= Bash Qaleh Rural District =

Rural district in West Azerbaijan province, Iran

Bash Qaleh Rural District Persian: دهستان باش‌قلعهه
- Rural District
- Location within Iran
- Coordinates: 37°39′N 45°11′E
- Country: Iran
- Province: West Azerbaijan
- County: Urmia
- District: Central
- Established: 1987
- Capital: Yurqunabad-e Olya

Population (2016)
  - Total: 10,043
- Time zone: UTC+3:30 (IRST)

Bash Qaleh Rural District (Persian: دهستان باش‌قلعه) is in the Central District of Urmia County, West Azerbaijan province, Iran. Its capital is the village of Yurqunabad-e Olya.

== Demographics ==
=== Population ===
At the time of the 2006 National Census, the rural district's population was 9,862 in 2,681 households. There were 9,994 inhabitants in 2,830 households at the following census of 2011. The 2016 census measured the population of the rural district as 10,043 in 3,033 households. The most populous of its 47 villages was Tupraq Qaleh, with 2,467 people.

=== Other villages in the rural district ===
- Chichakluy-e Bash Qaleh
- Golmarz-e Olya
- Kechah Bash
- Qaleh-ye Azizbeyg
- Qarabqolu
- Qosur
- Shur Kand
- Takalu
