= Mahmudabad Rural District (Shahin Dezh County) =

Rural district in West Azerbaijan province, Iran

Mahmudabad Rural District Persian: دهستان محمودآباد
- Rural District
- Location within Iran
- Coordinates: 36°40′N 46°29′E
- Country: Iran
- Province: West Azerbaijan
- County: Shahin Dezh
- District: Central
- Established: 1987
- Capital: Mahmudabad

Population (2016)
  - Total: 7,755
- Time zone: UTC+3:30 (IRST)

Mahmudabad Rural District (Persian: دهستان محمودآباد) is in the Central District of Shahin Dezh County, West Azerbaijan province, Iran. It is administered from the city of Mahmudabad.

== Demographics ==
=== Population ===
At the time of the 2006 National Census, the rural district's population was 7,899 in 1,741 households. There were 8,220 inhabitants in 2,159 households at the following census of 2011. The 2016 census measured the population of the rural district as 7,755 in 2,319 households. The most populous of its 38 villages was Aq Tappeh, with 1,267 people.

=== Other villages in the rural district ===
- Abbas Bolaghi
- Chichaklu
- Hajjiabad
- Hoseynabad
- Qarah Tappeh
- Qeshlaq-e Bakhtiar
- Sarujeh-ye Olya
- Yengi Orkh-e Niki
- Yengiabad-e Niki
