= Hulasu Rural District =

Rural district in West Azerbaijan province, Iran

Hulasu Rural District Persian: دهستان هولاسو
- Rural District
- Location within Iran
- Coordinates: 36°39′N 46°45′E
- Country: Iran
- Province: West Azerbaijan
- County: Shahin Dezh
- District: Central
- Established: 1987
- Capital: Hulasu

Population (2016)
  - Total: 9,182
- Time zone: UTC+3:30 (IRST)

Hulasu Rural District (Persian: دهستان هولاسو) is in the Central District of Shahin Dezh County, West Azerbaijan province, Iran. Its capital is the village of Hulasu.

== Demographics ==
=== Population ===
At the time of the 2006 National Census, the rural district's population was 12,396 in 2,637 households. There were 10,606 inhabitants in 2,715 households at the following census of 2011. The 2016 census measured the population of the rural district as 9,182 in 2,788 households. The most populous of its 45 villages was Hachasu, with 1,416 people.

=== Other villages in the rural district ===
- Aghajari
- Fathabad
- Kord Kandi
- Mahmudabad-e Olya
- Mamalu
- Manbar
- Qiz Korpi
