= Central District (Shahin Dezh County) =

District in West Azerbaijan province, Iran

Central District (Shahin Dezh County) Persian: بخش مرکزی شهرستان شاهین‌دژ
- District
- Location within Iran
- Coordinates: 36°36′N 46°41′E
- Country: Iran
- Province: West Azerbaijan
- County: Shahin Dezh
- Established: 1990
- Capital: Shahin Dezh

Population (2016)
  - Total: 73,179
- Time zone: UTC+3:30 (IRST)

The Central District of Shahin Dezh County (Persian: بخش مرکزی شهرستان شاهین‌دژ) is in West Azerbaijan province, Iran. Its capital is the city of Shahin Dezh.

== Demographics ==
=== Population ===
At the time of the 2006 National Census, the district's population was 68,286 in 16,131 households. The following census in 2011 counted 71,081 people in 19,150 households. The 2016 census measured the population of the district as 73,179 inhabitants in 21,872 households.

=== Administrative divisions ===
Central District (Shahin Dezh County) Population
Administrative Divisions	2006	2011	2016
Hulasu RD	12,396	10,606	9,182
Mahmudabad RD	7,899	8,220	7,755
Safa Khaneh RD	7,970	7,179	6,245
Mahmudabad (city)	5,817	6,680	6,866
Shahin Dezh (city)	34,204	38,396	43,131
Total	68,286	71,081	73,179
RD = Rural District
