= Shahin Dezh County =

County in West Azerbaijan province, Iran

Shahin Dezh County Persian: شهرستان شاهین‌دژ
- County
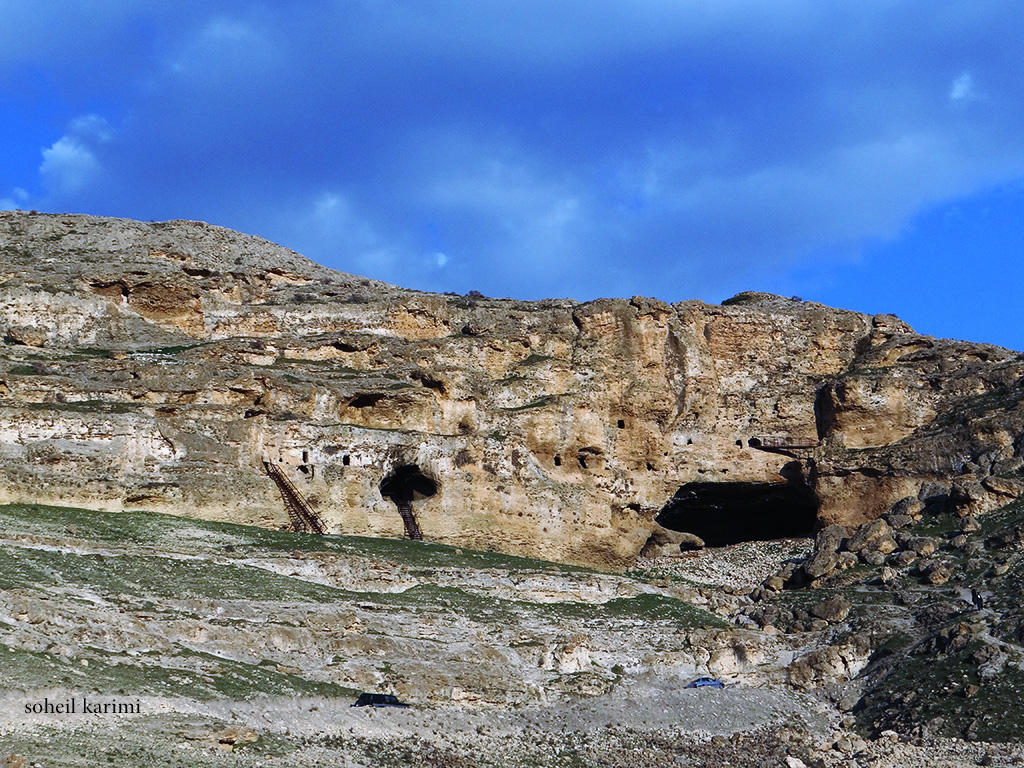
- Bibi Kand Stone Tombs Complex 2

- Location of Shahin Dezh County in West Azerbaijan province (bottom right, green)

- Location of West Azerbaijan province in Iran
- Coordinates: 36°39′N 46°35′E
- Country: Iran
- Province: West Azerbaijan
- Established: 1990
- Capital: Shahin Dezh
- Districts: Central, Keshavarz

Population (2016)
  - Total: 92,456
- Time zone: UTC+3:30 (IRST)

Shahin Dezh County (Persian: شهرستان شاهین‌دژ) (Note: South Azerbaijani: صائین قالا بؤلگه‌سی) is in West Azerbaijan province, Iran. Its capital is the city of Shahin Dezh.

== Demographics ==
=== Ethnicity and religion ===
About 70% of the population of the county are Shia Azerbaijanis and 30% are Sunni Kurds.

=== Population ===
At the time of the 2006 National Census, the county's population was 89,356 in 20,911 households. The following census in 2011 counted 91,113 people in 24,572 households. The 2016 census measured the population of the rural district as 92,456 in 27,669 households.

=== Administrative divisions ===
Shahin Dezh County's population history and administrative structure over three consecutive censuses are shown in the following table.

Shahin Dezh County Population
Administrative Divisions	2006	2011	2016
Central District	68,286	71,081	73,179
Hulasu RD	12,396	10,606	9,182
Mahmudabad RD	7,899	8,220	7,755
Safa Khaneh RD	7,970	7,179	6,245
Mahmudabad (city)	5,817	6,680	6,866
Shahin Dezh (city)	34,204	38,396	43,131
Keshavarz District	21,070	20,032	19,277
Chaharduli RD	6,353	5,470	4,986
Keshavarz RD	11,179	10,658	10,153
Keshavarz (city)	3,538	3,904	4,138
Total	89,356	91,113	92,456
RD = Rural District

== See also ==
Media related to Shahin Dezh County at Wikimedia Commons
