= West Azerbaijan province =

Province of Iran

West Azerbaijan Province استان آذربایجان غربی (Persian)
- Province
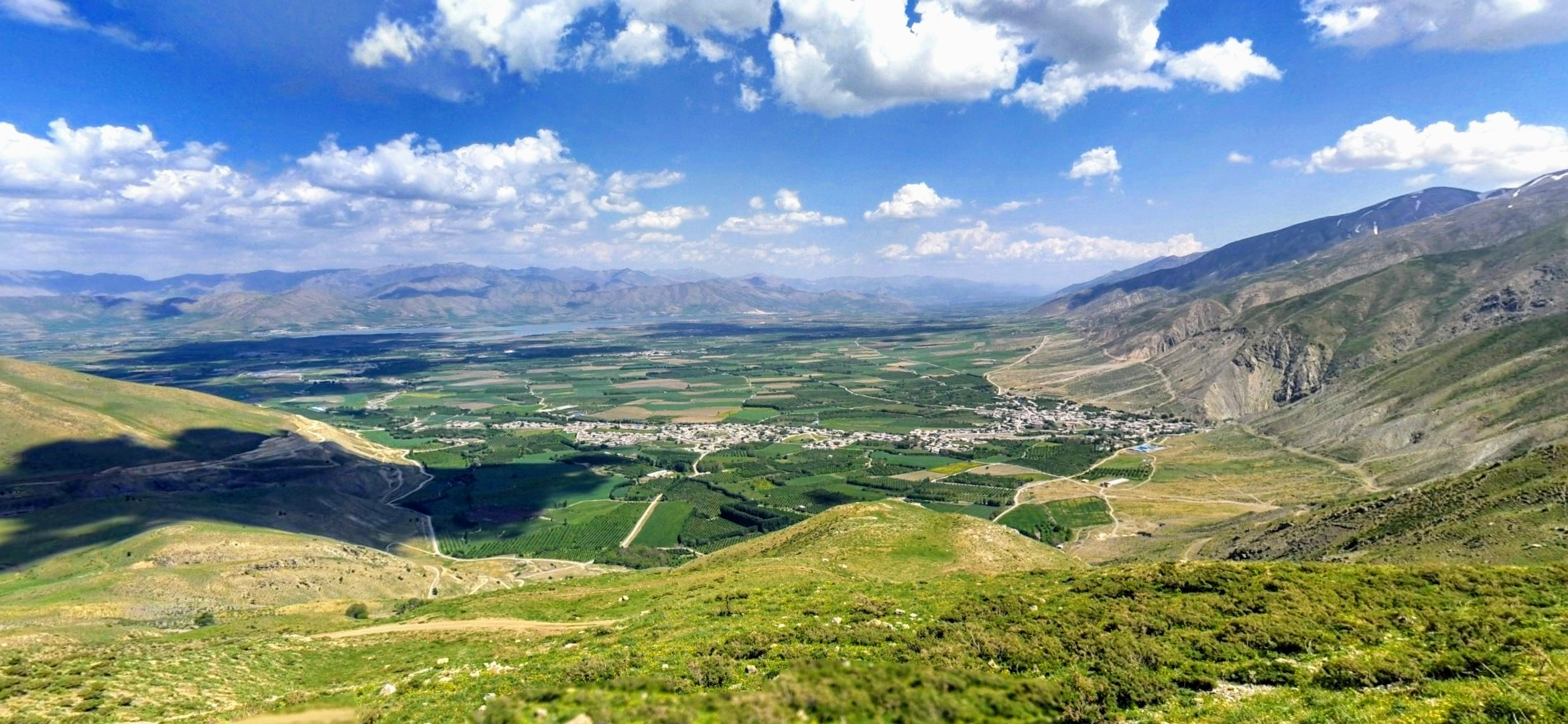
- Kohneh Lahijan (Kohneh Lajan) village

- Location of West Azerbaijan province within Iran
- Interactive map of West Azerbaijan Province
- Coordinates: 37°52′N 44°53′E
- Country: Iran
- Region: Region 3
- Capital: Urmia
- Counties: 20

Government
  - Governor-general: Reza Rahmani

Area
  - Total: 37,437 km^{2} (14,455 sq mi)

Population (2016)
  - Total: 3,265,219
  - Density: 87.219/km^{2} (225.90/sq mi)
- Time zone: UTC+03:30 (IRST)
- Area code: 44
- Main language(s): Persian (official) local languages: Armenian; Assyrian Neo-Aramaic; Azerbaijani; Kurdish; Lishán Didán
- HDI (2017): 0.758 high · 26th

West Azerbaijan province (Persian: استان آذربایجان غربی) (Note: Also romanized as Āzarbāyjān-e Gharbī; Kurdish: پارێزگای ئورمیە, romanized as Parêzgeha Urmiyê; Azerbaijani: غربی آذربایجان اوستانی, romanized as Qərbi Azərbaycan) is one of the 31 provinces of Iran, whose capital and largest city is Urmia. Following Urmia, the cities of Khoy, Bukan, Mahabad, and Miandoab are the province's largest cities, ranked in descending order of population. The cities of Salmas, Piranshahr and Naghadeh are considered medium-sized cities of the province.

It is in the northwest of the country, bordered by Turkey (Ağrı, Hakkâri, Iğdır and Van Provinces), Iraq (Erbil and Sulaymaniyah Governorates) and Azerbaijan's Nakhchivan Autonomous Republic, as well as the Iranian provinces of East Azerbaijan, Zanjan, and Kurdistan. West Azerbaijan province is part of Region 3. It forms parts of the areas unofficially known as Iranian Azerbaijan and Iranian Kurdistan. It is separated from Armenia by Turkey's short border with the Azerbaijan Republic. The province covers an area of 39,487 km^{2}, or 43,660 km^{2} including Lake Urmia.

== History ==
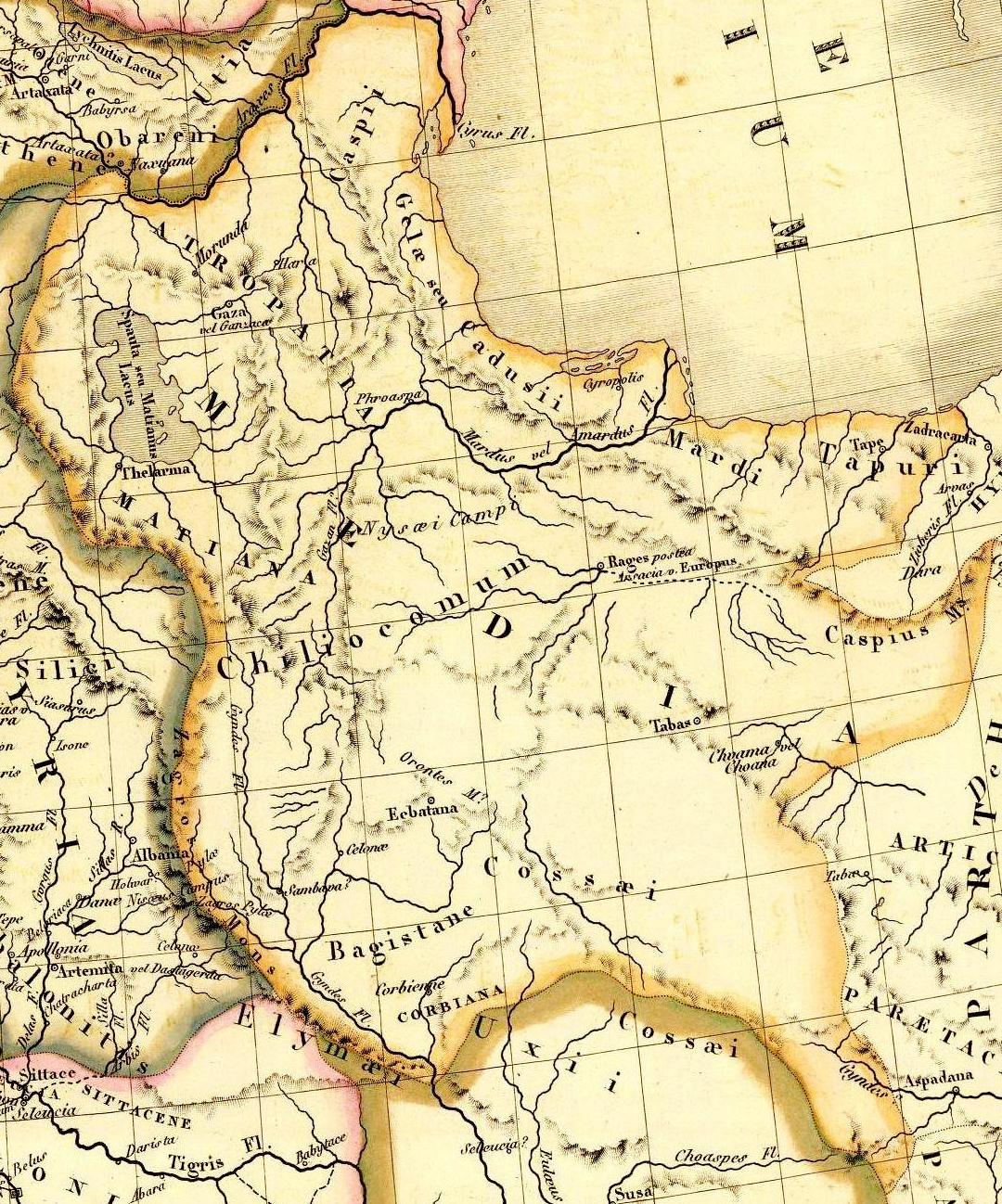
The region of the modern province as Matiene, as opposed to Atropatene to the east

The major known ancient civilization in the region was that of Mannaeans, a buffer state between Urartian and Assyrian sphere of influence. Mannaeans in turn spoke a language related to Urartian. After the fall of Assyria, the region was known as Mantiene (or Matiene) in Greek sources. Matiene bordered on Atropatene situated east of Lake Urmia.

The region is known as Vaspurakan and Nor Shirakan in Armenian history and made up an important part of historical Armenia, functioning as one of the cradles of Armenian civilisation. On 26 May 451 AD, a very important battle was fought that would prove pivotal in Armenian history. On the Avarayr Plain, at what is modern-day Churs in West Azerbaijan province, the Armenian army under Vardan Mamikonian clashed with the Sasanian one. Although the Persians were victorious on the battlefield itself, the battle proved to be a major strategic victory for Armenians, as Avarayr paved the way to the Nvarsak Treaty (484 AD), which affirmed Armenia's right to practice Christianity freely.

In the late 4th century AD the Sasanians incorporated the area into the neighbouring Adhurpadagan satrapy to the east. The name Adhurpadagan, later Arabicized to Azerbaijan, derives from Atropates, an Iranian satrap of Media under the Achaemenid Empire, who later was reinstated as the satrap of Media under Alexander of Macedonia.

In the 7th century this area was under Islamic rule. After Babak Khorramdin revolted, the grip of the Abbasid Caliphate weakened, allowing some native dynasties to rise. By the first half of the 11th century, the Byzantine emperors were actively trying to round off their eastern territories, in an attempt to absorb the unstable Armenian dynasties. In 1021–1022, emperor Basil II led his army as far as Khoy within 175 km of Dvin, and obtained the surrender of royalty from the Artsruni dynasty of Van. The Seljuk Turkic tribes, who the local Hadhabani Kurds initially resisted, eventually conquered the region in the 11th and early 12th centuries. During Timurid rule in the 14th century, Khoy gained an important role in the region.

After Hadhabanis, three other Kurdish principalities, Mukriyans in the southern part, Bradosti in the middle, and Donboli in the northern part ruled the region for centuries, who temporarily sided with either the Ottomans or the Safavids. The Siege of Dimdim between the Safavids and local Bradosti Kurds took place in this region. After a long and bloody siege led by the Safavid grand vizier Hatem Beg Ordubadi, which lasted from November 1609 to the summer of 1610, the Castle of Dimdim was captured. All the defenders were killed and Shah Abbas I ordered a general massacre in Bradost and Mukriyan (reported by Eskandar Beg, Safavid historian in the book Alam Aray-e Abbasi) and resettled the Afshar tribe in the region while deporting many Kurdish tribes to the Khorasan region, where many of their descendants still reside as of today.

The Safavid control was firmly restored by Shah Abbas but during the Afghan invasion (1722–1728) more than a century later, the Ottomans captured the northwestern regions of Iran, until Nader Shah expelled them and reasserted Iranian suzerainty over the region and far beyond. The Russian (Tsarist) army occupied the region in 1909, and again in 1912–1914 and 1915–1918 period. The Ottomans occupied the region in 1914–1915 and 1918–1919 periods. The Soviet forces occupied the region in 1941, resulting in the establishment of a short-lived, Soviet-supported puppet state called the Republic of Mahabad, from November 1945 to November 1946.

The districts of Maku, Khoy, Salmas, and Arasbaran, and the region of Urmia, according to 19th-century administrative division became a part of the northwestern Iranian province of Azerbaijan. In 1937, the province was renamed to Shomal-e gharb (Northwestern Province). Shortly after it the province of Azerbaijan was divided into a western and eastern part which were renamed to Chaharom (Fourth Province) and sevom (Third Province), respectively. In 1961, Fourth province was renamed West Azerbaijan by the Iranian authorities.

Some events in the 19th and 20th centuries are:

- Shaikh Ubeidullah Attacks, west and south of Lake Urmia in 1880;
- Simko Insurrections, west of Lake Urmia from 1918 to 1922;
- The Soviet occupation in 1944;
- The foundation and destruction of the Azerbaijan People's Government in 1945–1946;
- The foundation and destruction of the Republic of Mahabad in 1946 in County of Mahabad;
- Periodic severe fighting from 1979 until the 1990s near to boundaries of Iraq-Iran between Kurdish militia belonging to Kurdish political parties and the Iranian government. During the early 1980s parts of the province were outside central government's control.

=== Zoroaster claim ===
Some Muslim researchers have proclaimed that the birth of the prophet Zoroaster was in this area, in the vicinity of Lake Orumieh, Chichest or Ganzak; recent scholarship, however, indicates that sites in Central Asia are more likely.

== Demographics ==
=== Language and ethnicity ===
There are no official statistics on the ethnic or linguistic makeup of Western Azerbaijan. Most of the population of the province consists of Azerbaijanis and Kurds, with smaller populations of Armenians, Assyrians, and Jews. On the question of linguistic majority of the province, linguist Anonby argued in 2019 that:

As is the case for most other parts of Iran, there are no reliable or detailed data on language distribution in West Azerbaijan Province. A number of districts in the province are majority Azerbaijani-speaking, including the capital city of Orumieh (Urmia). Because of this – and perhaps also because of the province's name – it is often assumed that Azerbaijani is the main language of the province as a whole. However, our own preliminary investigations of this topic, which are based on district-by-district calculations... suggest that Kurdish may in fact be the mother tongue of a slight majority of the province's population.

==== Distribution ====
The counties of Bukan, Mahabad, Oshnavieh, Piranshahr and Sardasht are populated by Kurds, while Chaldoran, Maku, Miandoab, Naqadeh, Salmas and Takab have a mixed population of both Azerbaijanis and Kurds. Salmas moreover has a Christian minority.

=== Population ===
West Azerbaijan Province Historical Population
Year	Pop.	±%
1956	721,136	—
1966	1,087,182	+50.8%
1986	1,971,677	+81.4%
2006	2,831,779	+43.6%
2011	3,080,576	+8.8%
2016	3,265,219	+6.0%

At the time of the 2006 National Census, the province's population was 2,831,779 people in 655,260 households. The following census in 2011 counted 3,080,576 inhabitants in 822,152 households. The 2016 census measured the population of the province as 3,265,219 in 935,956 households.

=== Administrative divisions ===

The population history and structural changes of West Azerbaijan province's administrative divisions over three consecutive censuses are shown in the following table.

West Azerbaijan Province
Counties	2006	2011	2016
Baruq (Note: Separated from Miandoab County after the 2016 census)	—	—	—
Bukan	202,637	224,628	251,409
Chaharborj	—	—	—
Chaldoran	44,572	46,398	45,060
Chaypareh (Note: Separated from Khoy County after the 2006 census)	—	43,206	47,292
Khoy	365,573	354,309	348,664
Mahabad	197,441	215,529	236,849
Maku	174,578	88,863	94,751
Miandoab	245,153	260,628	273,949
Mirabad (Note: Separated from Sardasht County after the 2016 census)	—	—	—
Naqadeh	117,831	121,602	127,671
Oshnavieh	63,798	70,030	73,886
Piranshahr	107,677	123,639	138,864
Poldasht	—	42,071	42,170
Salmas	180,708	192,591	196,546
Sardasht	104,146	111,590	118,849
Shahin Dezh	89,356	91,113	92,456
Showt	—	52,519	55,682
Takab	81,395	78,122	80,556
Urmia	856,914	963,738	1,040,565
Total	2,831,779	3,080,576	3,265,219

=== Cities ===
According to the 2016 census, 2,136,203 people (over 65% of the population of West Azerbaijan province) live in the following cities:

City	Population
Avajiq	1,663
Baruq	4,225
Bazargan	9,979
Bukan	193,501
Chahar Borj	9,406
Dizaj Diz	8,282
Firuraq	9,190
Gerd Kashaneh	4,201
Ivughli	3,320
Keshavarz	4,138
Khalifan	749
Khoy	198,845
Mahabad	168,393
Mahmudabad	6,866
Maku	46,581
Marganlar	2,294
Miandoab	134,425
Mirabad	6,000
Mohammadyar	9,313
Nalus	2,973
Naqadeh	81,598
Nazok-e Olya	2,667
Nushin	8,380
Oshnavieh	39,801
Piranshahr	91,515
Poldasht	11,472
Qarah Zia od Din	26,767
Qatur	5,147
Qushchi	2,787
Rabat	15,750
Salmas	92,811
Sardasht	46,412
Serow	1,800
Shahin Dezh	43,131
Showt	25,381
Siah Cheshmeh	17,804
Silvaneh	1,614
Simmineh	1,345
Takab	49,677
Tazeh Shahr	8,629
Urmia	736,224
Zurabad	1,147

== Cities and larger towns ==
Rank	City	Population (2016)
1	Urmia	736,224
2	Khoy	198,845
3	Bukan	193,501
4	Mahabad	168,393
5	Miandoab	134,425
6	Salmas	92,811
7	Piranshahr	91,515
8	Naqadeh	81,598
9	Takab	49,677
10	Maku	46,581
11	Sardasht	46,412
12	Shahin Dezh	43,131
13	Oshnavieh	39,801
14	Qarah Zia od Din	26,767
15	Showt	25,381

== Geography ==
=== Location ===
With an area of 43,660 square kilometers, including Lake Urmia, the province of West Azerbaijan is located on the northwest of Iran.

=== Climate ===
Cold northern winds affect the province during winter and cause heavy snow. According to existing meteorological data, local temperatures vary within the province. Average temperature differs from 9.4 °C in Piranshahr to 11.6 °C in Mahabad, while it is 9.8 °C in Urmia, 10.8 °C in Khoy, 9.4 °C in Piranshahr, and in Mahabad 11.6 °C. According to the same data, the highest temperature in the province reaches 34 °C in July, and the lowest temperature is –16 °C in January. The maximum change of temperature in summer is 4 °C and in winter 15 °C.

== Archaeology ==
Permanent settlements were established in the province as early as the 6th millennium BC as excavation at sites such as Teppe Hasanlu establish. In Hasanlu, a famous Golden Vase was found in 1958. The province is the location of Tepe Hajji Firuz, site of some of the world's earliest evidence of wine production. Gooy Teppe is another significant site, where a metal plaque dating from 800 BC was found that depicts a scene from the Epic of Gilgamesh.

Ruins such as these and the UNESCO world heritage site at the Sasanian compound of Takht-e Soleymān illustrate the strategic importance and tumultuous history of the province through the millennia. Overall, the province enjoys a wealth of historical attractions, with 169 sites registered by the Cultural Heritage Organization of Iran.

== Higher education ==
Urmia University was first built by an American Presbyterian missionary in 1878. A medical faculty was also established there, headed by Joseph Cochran and a team of American medical associates. Cochran and his colleagues were buried in an old cemetery in the vicinity of Urmia. Urmia University website says this about them:

"There they lie in peace away from their homeland, and the testimonial epitaphs on their tombs signify their endeavor and devotion to humanity."

The province today has the following major institutions of higher education:

1. Urmia University دانشگاه ارومیه | Urmia University
2. Urmia University of Medical Sciences
3. Urmia University of Technology
4. Islamic Azad University of Urmia
5. Islamic Azad University of Salmas
6. Islamic Azad University of Khoi
7. Islamic Azad University of Piranshahr
8. Islamic Azad University of Mahabad

== See also ==
Media related to West Azerbaijan Province at Wikimedia Commons
