= July 15 =

July 15 this year in various calendars
- Wednesday, 15 July 2026
Other calendars
Armenian	30 Hrotich 1475
Aztec	Quecholli 6, 5 Ocēlōtl
Babylonian	29 Simanu, 2337 SE
Balinese pawukon	Menga, Kajeng, Menala, Pon, Maulu, Buda of Pujut, Yama, Dadi, Sri
Bengali	7 Bhadro, BS 1433
Chinese	Yang Metal Tiger・Three Stars Mansion -28 Qīyuè, Bǐngwǔnián (Xiaoshu, 8 days until Dashu)
Common Era	15 July 2026 CE
Coptic	8 Epip, AM 1742
Egyptian	30 Athyr, 2775 NE
Ethiopian	8 Ḥamlē, 2018 Amätä Məhrät
French Republican	Décade III, Septidi de Messidor de l'Année 234 de la République
Gregorian	15 July, AD 2026
Hebrew	1 Av, AM 5786
Icelandic	Miðvikudagur, 24 Sólmánuður 2026
Islamic	29 Muharram, AH 1448 (using tabular method)
ISO week date	2026-W29-3
Japanese	2 Minazuki, Reiwa 8 (Shōsho, 8 days until Taisho)
Julian	2 July, AD 2026 (AM 7534)
Julian day	2461237
Maya	13.0.13.13.14; 7 Xul, 5 Ix
Roman	ante diem VI Nonas Iulias, MMDCCLXXIX AUC
Solar Hijri	24 Tir, SH 1405

<<	July					>>
Su	Mo	Tu	We	Th	Fr	Sa
			1	2	3	4
5	6	7	8	9	10	11
12	13	14	15	16	17	18
19	20	21	22	23	24	25
26	27	28	29	30	31
2026

July 15 in recent years
2026 (Wednesday)
2025 (Tuesday)
2024 (Monday)
2023 (Saturday)
2022 (Friday)
2021 (Thursday)
2020 (Wednesday)
2019 (Monday)
2018 (Sunday)
2017 (Saturday)

July 15 is the 196th day of the year (197th in leap years) in the Gregorian calendar; 169 days remain until the end of the year.

== Events ==
=== Pre-1600 ===
- 484 BC – Dedication of the Temple of Castor and Pollux in ancient Rome.
- 70 – First Jewish–Roman War: Titus and his armies breach the walls of Jerusalem. (17th of Tammuz in the Hebrew calendar).
- 756 – An Lushan Rebellion: Emperor Xuanzong of Tang is ordered by his Imperial Guards to execute chancellor Yang Guozhong by forcing him to commit suicide or face a mutiny. General An Lushan has other members of the emperor's family killed.
- 1099 – First Crusade: Christian soldiers take the Church of the Holy Sepulchre in Jerusalem after the final assault of a difficult siege.
- 1149 – The reconstructed Church of the Holy Sepulchre is consecrated in Jerusalem.
- 1207 – King John of England expels Canterbury monks for supporting Archbishop Stephen Langton.
- 1240 – Swedish–Novgorodian Wars: A Novgorodian army led by Alexander Nevsky defeats the Swedes in the Battle of the Neva.
- 1381 – John Ball, a leader in the Peasants' Revolt, is hanged, drawn and quartered in the presence of King Richard II of England.
- 1410 – Polish–Lithuanian–Teutonic War: Battle of Grunwald: The allied forces of the Kingdom of Poland and the Grand Duchy of Lithuania defeat the army of the Teutonic Order.
- 1482 – Muhammad XI is crowned the twenty-second and last Nasrid king of Granada.

=== 1601–1900 ===
- 1640 – The first university of Finland, the Royal Academy of Turku, is inaugurated in Turku.
- 1738 – Baruch Laibov and Alexander Voznitsyn are burned alive in St. Petersburg, Russia. Vonitzin had converted to Judaism with Laibov's help, with the consent of Empress Anna Ivanovna.
- 1741 – Aleksei Chirikov sights land in Southeast Alaska. He sends men ashore in a longboat, making them the first Europeans to visit Alaska.
- 1789 – French Revolution: Gilbert du Motier, Marquis de Lafayette, is named by acclamation Colonel General of the new National Guard of Paris.
- 1799 – The Rosetta Stone is found in the Egyptian village of Rosetta by French Captain Pierre-François Bouchard during Napoleon's Egyptian Campaign.
- 1806 – Pike Expedition: United States Army Lieutenant Zebulon Pike begins an expedition from Fort Bellefontaine near St. Louis, Missouri, to explore the west.
- 1815 – Napoleonic Wars: Napoleon Bonaparte surrenders aboard HMS Bellerophon.
- 1823 – A fire destroys the ancient Basilica of Saint Paul Outside the Walls in Rome, Italy.
- 1834 – The Spanish Inquisition is officially disbanded after nearly 356 years.
- 1838 – Ralph Waldo Emerson delivers the Divinity School Address at Harvard Divinity School, discounting Biblical miracles and declaring Jesus a great man, but not God. The Protestant community reacts with outrage.
- 1840 – The Great Powers of Europe conclude the convention of London in order to stabilise the Near East.
- 1849 – The first air raid in history occurs; Austria launches pilotless balloons against the city of Venice.
- 1862 – American Civil War: The CSS Arkansas, the most effective ironclad on the Mississippi River, battles with Union Navy ships commanded by Admiral David Farragut, severely damaging three ships and sustaining heavy damage herself.
- 1870 – Reconstruction Era of the United States: Georgia becomes the last of the former Confederate states to be readmitted to the Union.
- 1870 – Canadian Confederation: Rupert's Land and the North-Western Territory are transferred to Canada from the Hudson's Bay Company, and the province of Manitoba and the Northwest Territories are established from these vast territories.
- 1888 – The stratovolcano Mount Bandai erupts, killing approximately 500 people in Fukushima Prefecture, Japan.

=== 1901–present ===
- 1910 – In his book Clinical Psychiatry, Emil Kraepelin gives a name to Alzheimer's disease, naming it after his colleague Alois Alzheimer.
- 1916 – In Seattle, Washington, William Boeing and George Conrad Westervelt incorporate Pacific Aero Products (later renamed Boeing).
- 1918 – World War I: The Second Battle of the Marne begins near the River Marne with a German attack.
- 1920 – Aftermath of World War I: The Parliament of Poland establishes Silesian Voivodeship before the Polish-German plebiscite.
- 1922 – The Japanese Communist Party is established in Japan.
- 1927 – Massacre of July 15, 1927: Eighty-nine protesters are killed by Austrian police in Vienna.
- 1942 – The Holocaust: Nazi Germany begins the deportation of 100,000 Jews from the occupied Netherlands to extermination camps.
- 1946 – The State of North Borneo, now Sabah, Malaysia, is annexed by the United Kingdom.
- 1954 – The Boeing 367-80, the prototype for both the Boeing 707 and C-135 series, takes its first flight.
- 1955 – Eighteen Nobel laureates sign the Mainau Declaration against nuclear weapons, later co-signed by thirty-four others.
- 1966 – Vietnam War: The United States and South Vietnam begin Operation Hastings to push the North Vietnamese out of the Vietnamese Demilitarized Zone.
- 1971 – The United Red Army is founded in Japan.
- 1974 – In Nicosia, Cyprus, Greek junta-sponsored nationalists launch a coup d'état, deposing Makarios III and installing Nikos Sampson as the president of Cyprus.
- 1975 – Space Race: Apollo–Soyuz Test Project features the dual launch of an Apollo spacecraft and a Soyuz spacecraft on the first Soviet-United States human-crewed flight. It was the last launch of both an Apollo spacecraft, and the Saturn family of rockets.
- 1979 – U.S. president Jimmy Carter gives his "malaise speech".
- 1983 – An attack at Orly Airport in Paris is launched by Armenian militant organisation ASALA, leaving eight people dead and 55 injured.
- 1983 – Nintendo and Sega enter the console market with the respective releases of the Famicom and SG-1000 in Japan.
- 1996 – A Belgian Air Force C-130 Hercules carrying the Royal Netherlands Army marching band crashes on landing at Eindhoven Airport.
- 1998 – Sri Lankan Civil War: Sri Lankan Tamil MP S. Shanmuganathan is killed by a claymore mine.
- 2002 – "American Taliban" John Walker Lindh pleads guilty to supplying aid to the enemy and possession of explosives during the commission of a felony.
- 2002 – The Anti-Terrorism Court of Pakistan sentences British-born Ahmed Omar Saeed Sheikh to death, and three others suspected of murdering The Wall Street Journal reporter Daniel Pearl to life.
- 2003 – AOL Time Warner disbands Netscape. The Mozilla Foundation is established on the same day.
- 2006 – Twitter, later one of the largest social media platforms in the world, is launched.
- 2009 – Caspian Airlines Flight 7908 crashes near Jannatabad, Qazvin, Iran, killing 168.
- 2009 – Space Shuttle program: Endeavour is launched on STS-127 to complete assembly of the International Space Station's Kibō module.
- 2012 – South Korean rapper Psy releases his hit single Gangnam Style.
- 2014 – A train derails on the Moscow Metro, killing at least 24 and injuring more than 160 others.
- 2016 – Factions of the Turkish Armed Forces attempt a coup.
- 2018 – France win their second World Cup title, defeating Croatia 4–2.

== Births ==
=== Pre-1600 ===
- 980 – Ichijō, Japanese emperor (died 1011)
- 1273 – Ewostatewos, Ethiopian monk and saint (died 1352)
- 1353 – Vladimir the Bold, Russian prince (died 1410)
- 1359 – Antonio Correr, Italian cardinal (died 1445)
- 1442 – Boček IV of Poděbrady, Bohemian nobleman (died 1496)
- 1455 – Queen Yun, Korean queen (died 1482)
- 1471 – Eskender, Ethiopian emperor (died 1494)
- 1478 – Barbara Jagiellon, duchess consort of Saxony and Margravine consort of Meissen (died 1534)
- 1573 – Inigo Jones, English architect, designed the Queen's House (died 1652)
- 1600 – Jan Cossiers, Flemish painter (died 1671)

=== 1601–1900 ===
- 1606 – Rembrandt, Dutch painter and etcher (died 1669)
- 1611 – Jai Singh I, maharaja of Jaipur (died 1667)
- 1613 – Gu Yanwu, Chinese philologist and geographer (died 1682)
- 1631 – Jens Juel, Danish politician and diplomat, Governor-general of Norway (died 1700)
- 1631 – Richard Cumberland, English philosopher (died 1718)
- 1638 – Giovanni Buonaventura Viviani, Italian violinist and composer (died 1693)
- 1704 – August Gottlieb Spangenberg, German bishop and theologian (died 1792)
- 1779 – Clement Clarke Moore, American author, poet, and educator (died 1863)
- 1793 – Almira Hart Lincoln Phelps, American educator, author, editor (died 1884)
- 1796 – Thomas Bulfinch, American mythologist (died 1867)
- 1799 – Reuben Chapman, American lawyer and politician, 13th Governor of Alabama (died 1882)
- 1800 – Sidney Breese, American jurist and politician (died 1878)
- 1808 – Henry Edward Manning, English cardinal (died 1892)
- 1812 – James Hope-Scott, English lawyer and academic (died 1873)
- 1817 – Sir John Fowler, 1st Baronet, English engineer, designed the Forth Bridge (died 1898)
- 1827 – W. W. Thayer American lawyer and politician, 6th Governor of Oregon (died 1899)
- 1848 – Vilfredo Pareto, Italian economist and sociologist (died 1923)
- 1850 – Frances Xavier Cabrini, Italian-American nun and saint (died 1917)
- 1852 – Josef Josephi, Polish-born singer and actor (died 1920)
- 1858 – Emmeline Pankhurst, English political activist and suffragist (died 1928)
- 1864 – Marie Tempest, English actress and singer (died 1942)
- 1865 – Alfred Harmsworth, 1st Viscount Northcliffe, Anglo-Irish businessman and publisher, founded the Amalgamated Press (died 1922)
- 1865 – Wilhelm Wirtinger, Austrian-German mathematician and theorist (died 1945)
- 1867 – Jean-Baptiste Charcot, French physician and explorer (died 1936)
- 1871 – Doppo Kunikida, Japanese journalist, author, and poet (died 1908)
- 1871 – Dan McGann, American baseball player (died 1910)
- 1880 – Enrique Mosca, Argentinian lawyer and politician (died 1950)
- 1883 – Denny Barry, Irish Republican, died during the 1923 Irish Hunger Strikes (died 1923)
- 1887 – Wharton Esherick, American sculptor (died 1970)
- 1892 – Walter Benjamin, German philosopher and critic (died 1940)
- 1893 – Enid Bennett, Australian-American actress (died 1969)
- 1893 – Dick Rauch, American football player and coach (died 1970)
- 1894 – Tadeusz Sendzimir, Polish-American engineer (died 1989)
- 1899 – Seán Lemass, Irish soldier and politician, 4th Taoiseach of Ireland (died 1971)

=== 1901–present ===
- 1902 – Jean Rey, Belgian lawyer and politician, 2nd President of the European Commission (died 1983)
- 1903 – Walter D. Edmonds, American journalist and author (died 1998)
- 1903 – K. Kamaraj, Indian journalist and politician (died 1975)
- 1904 – Rudolf Arnheim, German-American psychologist and author (died 2007)
- 1905 – Dorothy Fields, American songwriter (died 1974)
- 1905 – Anita Farra, Italian actress (died 2008)
- 1906 – R. S. Mugali, Indian poet and academic (died 1993)
- 1906 – Rudolf Uhlenhaut, English-German engineer (died 1989)
- 1909 – Jean Hamburger, French physician and surgeon (died 1992)
- 1911 – Edward Shackleton, Baron Shackleton, English geographer and politician, Secretary of State for Air (died 1994)
- 1913 – Cowboy Copas, American singer-songwriter and guitarist (died 1963)
- 1913 – Hammond Innes, English journalist and author (died 1998)
- 1913 – Abraham Sutzkever, Russian poet and author (died 2010)
- 1914 – Birabongse Bhanudej, Thai racing driver and sailor, member of the Thai royal family (died 1985)
- 1914 – Akhtar Hameed Khan, Pakistani economist, scholar, and activist (died 1999)
- 1914 – Howard Vernon, Swiss-French actor (died 1996)
- 1915 – Albert Ghiorso, American chemist and academic (died 2010)
- 1915 – Kashmir Singh Katoch, Indian army officer (died 2007)
- 1916 – Sumner Gerard, American politician and diplomat (died 2005)
- 1917 – Robert Conquest, English-American historian, poet, and academic (died 2015)
- 1917 – Joan Roberts, American actress and singer (died 2012)
- 1917 – Nur Muhammad Taraki, Afghan journalist and politician (died 1979)
- 1918 – Bertram Brockhouse, Canadian physicist and academic, Nobel Prize laureate (died 2003)
- 1918 – Brenda Milner, English-Canadian neuropsychologist and academic
- 1919 – Fritz Langanke, German lieutenant (died 2012)
- 1919 – Iris Murdoch, Anglo-Irish British novelist and philosopher (died 1999)
- 1921 – Henri Colpi, Swiss-French director and screenwriter (died 2006)
- 1921 – Robert Bruce Merrifield, American biochemist and academic, Nobel Prize laureate (died 2006)
- 1922 – Leon M. Lederman, American physicist and mathematician, Nobel Prize laureate (died 2018)
- 1922 – Jean-Pierre Richard, French writer (died 2019)
- 1923 – Philly Joe Jones, American jazz drummer (Miles Davis Quintet) (died 1985)
- 1924 – Jeremiah Denton, American admiral and politician (died 2014)
- 1924 – Marianne Bernadotte, Swedish actress and philanthropist (died 2025)
- 1925 – Philip Carey, American actor (died 2009)
- 1925 – Taylor Hardwick, American architect, designed Haydon Burns Library and Friendship Fountain Park (died 2014)
- 1925 – D. A. Pennebaker, American documentary filmmaker (died 2019)
- 1925 – Evan Hultman, American politician (died 2025)
- 1925 – Antony Carbone, American actor (died 2020)
- 1925 – Pandel Savic, American football player (died 2018)
- 1926 – Driss Chraïbi, Moroccan-French journalist and author (died 2007)
- 1926 – Leopoldo Galtieri, Argentinian general and politician, 44th President of Argentina (died 2003)
- 1926 – Raymond Gosling, English physicist and academic (died 2015)
- 1926 – Sir John Graham, 4th Baronet, English diplomat (died 2019)
- 1927 – Nan Martin, American actress (died 2010)
- 1927 – Carmen Zapata, American actress (died 2014)
- 1927 – Håkon Brusveen, Norwegian cross-country skier (died 2021)
- 1928 – Pál Benkő, Hungarian-American chess player (died 2019)
- 1928 – Carl Woese, American microbiologist and biophysicist (died 2012)
- 1928 – Viramachaneni Vimla Devi, Indian parliamentarian (died 1967)
- 1929 – Charles Anthony, American tenor and actor (died 2012)
- 1929 – Francis Bebey, Cameroonian-French guitarist (died 2001)
- 1929 – Ian Stewart, Scottish racing driver (died 2017)
- 1930 – Jacques Derrida, Algerian-French philosopher and academic (died 2004)
- 1930 – Richard Garneau, Canadian journalist and sportscaster (died 2013)
- 1930 – Stephen Smale, American mathematician and computer scientist
- 1930 – Einosuke Akiya, Japanese Buddhist leader
- 1931 – Clive Cussler, American archaeologist and author (died 2020)
- 1931 – Joanna Merlin, American actress and casting director (died 2023)
- 1931 – Jacques-Yvan Morin, Canadian lawyer and politician, Deputy Premier of Quebec (died 2023)
- 1932 – Ed Litzenberger, Canadian ice hockey player (died 2010)
- 1933 – Julian Bream, English classical guitarist and lutenist (died 2020)
- 1933 – Guido Crepax, Italian author and illustrator (died 2003)
- 1933 – John Hopfield, American physicist and neuroscientist, 2024 Nobel laureate
- 1933 – M. T. Vasudevan Nair, Indian author and screenwriter (died 2024)
- 1934 – Harrison Birtwistle, English composer and academic (died 2022)
- 1934 – Eva Krížiková, Czech actress (died 2020)
- 1934 – Risto Jarva, Finnish director and producer (died 1977)
- 1935 – Donn Clendenon, American baseball player and lawyer (died 2005)
- 1935 – Alex Karras, American football player, wrestler, and actor (died 2012)
- 1935 – Ken Kercheval, American actor and director (died 2019)
- 1936 – George Voinovich, American lawyer and politician, 65th Governor of Ohio (died 2016)
- 1937 – Prabhash Joshi, Indian journalist (died 2009)
- 1938 – Bill Alsup, American racing driver (died 2016)
- 1938 – Ernie Barnes, American football player, actor, and painter (died 2009)
- 1938 – Carmen Callil, Australian publisher, founded Virago Press (died 2022)
- 1938 – Barry Goldwater, Jr., American lawyer and politician
- 1939 – Aníbal Cavaco Silva, Portuguese economist and politician, 19th President of the Portuguese Republic
- 1940 – Chris Cord, American racing driver (died 2022)
- 1940 – Denis Héroux, Canadian director and producer (died 2015)
- 1940 – Ronald Gene Simmons, American sergeant and convicted murderer (died 1990)
- 1940 – Robert Winston, English surgeon, academic, and politician
- 1941 – Livia Gouverneur, Venezuelan activist (died 1961)
- 1941 – Archie Clark, American basketball player
- 1942 – Vivian Malone Jones, American civil rights activist (died 2005)
- 1943 – Jocelyn Bell Burnell, Northern Irish astrophysicist, astronomer, and academic
- 1944 – Millie Jackson, American singer-songwriter
- 1944 – Jan-Michael Vincent, American actor (died 2019)
- 1944 – Nigel Williams, English conservator (died 1992)
- 1945 – David Arthur Granger, Guyanese politician, 9th President of Guyana
- 1945 – Peter Lewis, American singer-songwriter and guitarist
- 1945 – Jürgen Möllemann, German soldier and politician, Vice-Chancellor of Germany (died 2003)
- 1946 – Linda Ronstadt, American singer-songwriter, producer, and actress
- 1946 – Hassanal Bolkiah, Sultan of Brunei
- 1947 – Lydia Davis, American short story writer, novelist, and essayist
- 1947 – Pridiyathorn Devakula, Thai economist and politician, Thai Minister of Finance
- 1947 – Roky Erickson, American singer-songwriter and musician (died 2019)
- 1948 – Twinkle, English singer-songwriter (died 2015)
- 1948 – Dimosthenis Kourtovik, Greek anthropologist and critic
- 1948 – Artimus Pyle, American rock drummer and songwriter
- 1949 – Carl Bildt, Swedish politician and diplomat, Prime Minister of Sweden
- 1949 – Trevor Horn, English singer-songwriter, keyboard player, and producer
- 1949 – Harvey C. Krautschun, American politician (died 2026)
- 1949 – Richard Russo, American novelist, short story writer, and screenwriter
- 1950 – Colin Barnett, Australian economist and politician, 29th Premier of Western Australia
- 1950 – Steve James, American guitarist, songwriter, and luthier (died 2023)
- 1950 – Arianna Huffington, Greek-American journalist and publisher
- 1951 – Gregory Isaacs, Jamaican-English singer-songwriter (died 2010)
- 1951 – Jesse Ventura, American wrestler, actor, and politician, 38th Governor of Minnesota
- 1952 – John Cleland, British racing driver
- 1952 – Celia Imrie, English actress
- 1952 – Terry O'Quinn, American actor
- 1952 – David Pack, American singer-songwriter, guitarist, and producer
- 1952 – Marky Ramone, American drummer and songwriter
- 1952 – Johnny Thunders, American singer-songwriter and guitarist (died 1991)
- 1953 – Jean-Bertrand Aristide, Haitian priest and politician, 49th President of Haiti
- 1953 – Sultanah Haminah, Malaysian royal consort
- 1953 – Mohamad Shahrum Osman, Malaysian politician
- 1953 – Alicia Bridges, American singer-songwriter
- 1954 – John Ferguson, Australian rugby league player
- 1954 – Giorgos Kaminis, American-Greek lawyer and politician, 78th Mayor of Athens
- 1954 – Mario Kempes, Argentinian footballer and manager
- 1956 – Ashoke Sen, Indian theoretical physicist and string theorist
- 1956 – Ian Curtis, English singer-songwriter and guitarist (died 1980)
- 1956 – Nicholas Harberd, British botanist, educator, and academician
- 1956 – Barry Melrose, Canadian ice hockey player, coach, and sportscaster
- 1956 – Steve Mortimer, Australian rugby league player, coach, and administrator
- 1956 – Joe Satriani, American singer-songwriter and guitarist
- 1956 – Wayne Taylor, South African racing driver
- 1957 – Cecile Richards, American activist and former Planned Parenthood president (died 2025)
- 1957 – Mac McAnally, American singer-songwriter
- 1958 – Gary Heale, English footballer and coach
- 1958 – Mac Thornberry, American lawyer and politician
- 1959 – Vincent Lindon, French actor, director, and screenwriter
- 1961 – Lolita Davidovich, Canadian actress
- 1961 – Jean-Christophe Grangé, French journalist and screenwriter
- 1961 – Forest Whitaker, American actor
- 1962 – Nikos Filippou, Greek basketball player and manager
- 1962 – Michelle Ford, Australian swimmer
- 1963 – Brigitte Nielsen, Danish-Italian actress
- 1963 – Steve Thomas, English-Canadian ice hockey player and coach
- 1965 – Alistair Carmichael, Scottish lawyer and politician, Secretary of State for Scotland
- 1965 – Gero Miesenböck, Austrian neuroscientist and educator
- 1965 – David Miliband, English politician, Secretary of State for Foreign and Commonwealth Affairs
- 1966 – Jason Bonham, English singer-songwriter and drummer
- 1966 – Irène Jacob, French-Swiss actress
- 1967 – Adam Savage, American actor and special effects designer
- 1967 – Elbert West, American singer-songwriter (died 2015)
- 1968 – Eddie Griffin, American comedian, actor, and producer
- 1969 – Ain Tammus, Estonian footballer and coach
- 1970 – Tarkan Gözübüyük, Turkish bass player and producer
- 1971 – Jim Rash, American actor, comedian, and filmmaker
- 1972 – Scott Foley, American actor
- 1972 – John Dolmayan, Armenian-American drummer
- 1973 – Brian Austin Green, American actor
- 1973 – Buju Banton, Jamaican singer
- 1975 – Cherry, American wrestler and manager
- 1975 – Danny Law, English cricketer
- 1975 – Ben Pepper, Australian basketball player
- 1976 – Steve Cunningham, American boxer
- 1976 – Marco Di Vaio, Italian footballer
- 1976 – Diane Kruger, German actress and model
- 1976 – Gabriel Iglesias, Mexican-American comedian and voice actor
- 1977 – D. J. Kennington, Canadian racing driver
- 1977 – André Nel, South African cricketer
- 1977 – Lana Parrilla, American actress
- 1977 – John St. Clair, American football player
- 1977 – Ray Toro, American singer-songwriter and guitarist
- 1978 – Miguel Olivo, Dominican baseball player
- 1979 – Laura Benanti, American actress and singer
- 1979 – Alexander Frei, Swiss footballer
- 1979 – Edda Garðarsdóttir, Icelandic footballer
- 1979 – Renata Kučerová, Czech tennis player
- 1979 – Travis Fimmel, Australian actor
- 1980 – Reggie Abercrombie, American baseball player
- 1980 – Jonathan Cheechoo, Canadian ice hockey player
- 1980 – Julia Perez, Indonesian singer and actress (died 2017)
- 1980 – Jasper Pääkkönen, Finnish actor
- 1981 – Alou Diarra, French footballer
- 1981 – Petros Klampanis, Greek bassist and composer
- 1981 – Marius Stankevičius, Lithuanian footballer
- 1981 – Taylor Kinney, American actor
- 1982 – Julien Canal, French racing driver
- 1982 – Neemia Tialata, New Zealand rugby player
- 1982 – Aída Yéspica, Venezuelan model and actress
- 1983 – Salvatore Iovino, American racing driver
- 1983 – Nelson Merlo, Brazilian racing driver
- 1983 – Heath Slater, American wrestler
- 1984 – Angelo Siniscalchi, Italian footballer
- 1984 – Veronika Velez-Zuzulová, Slovak skier
- 1986 – Yahya Abdul-Mateen II, American actor
- 1986 – Tyler Kennedy, Canadian ice hockey player
- 1986 – Kareem Rahma, Egyptian-American comedian, artist, and media entrepreneur
- 1988 – Aimee Carrero, American actress
- 1989 – Alisa Kleybanova, Russian tennis player
- 1989 – Anthony Randolph, American basketball player
- 1989 – Tristan Wilds, American actor and singer-songwriter
- 1990 – Olly Alexander, English singer and actor
- 1990 – Zach Bogosian, American ice hockey player
- 1990 – Damian Lillard, American basketball player
- 1990 – Tyler Young, American racing driver
- 1991 – Danilo, Brazilian footballer
- 1991 – Derrick Favors, American basketball player
- 1991 – Evgeny Tishchenko, Russian boxer
- 1991 – Nuria Párrizas Díaz, Spanish tennis player
- 1992 – Tobias Harris, American basketball player
- 1992 – Wayde van Niekerk, South African sprinter
- 1992 – Porter Robinson, American DJ and singer-songwriter
- 1993 – Håvard Nielsen, Norwegian footballer
- 1993 – Harrison Rhodes, American racing driver
- 1993 – Masataka Yoshida, Japanese baseball player
- 1994 – Mason Dye, American actor
- 1996 – Vivianne Miedema, Dutch football player
- 1997 – Jil Teichmann, Swiss tennis player
- 1997 – Anthony Cirelli, Canadian ice hockey player
- 1998 – Noah Gragson, American racing driver
- 1999 – Mohamed Sobhy, Egyptian footballer
- 2005 – JuJu Watkins, American basketball player
- 2008 – Iain Armitage, American actor

== Deaths ==
=== Pre-1600 ===
- 756 – Yang Guifei, consort of Xuan Zong (born 719)
- 998 – Abū al-Wafā' Būzjānī, Persian mathematician and astronomer (born 940)
- 1015 – Vladimir the Great, Grand prince of Kievan Rus' (born c. 958)
- 1274 – Bonaventure, Italian bishop and saint (born 1221)
- 1291 – Rudolf I of Germany (born 1218)
- 1299 – King Eric II of Norway (born c. 1268)
- 1381 – John Ball, English Lollard priest
- 1388 – Agnes of Durazzo, titular Latin empress consort of Constantinople (born 1313)
- 1397 – Catherine of Henneberg, German ruler (born c. 1334)
- 1406 – William, Duke of Austria
- 1410 – Ulrich von Jungingen, German Grand Master of the Teutonic Knights (born 1360)
- 1445 – Joan Beaufort, Queen of Scotland
- 1542 – Lisa del Giocondo, subject of Leonardo da Vinci's painting Mona Lisa (born 1479)
- 1544 – René of Châlon (born 1519)
- 1571 – Shimazu Takahisa, Japanese daimyō (born 1514)

=== 1601–1900 ===
- 1609 – Annibale Carracci, Italian painter and illustrator (born 1560)
- 1614 – Pierre de Bourdeille, seigneur de Brantôme, French soldier, historian and author (born 1540)
- 1655 – Girolamo Rainaldi, Italian architect (born 1570)
- 1685 – James Scott, 1st Duke of Monmouth, Dutch-born English general and claimant to the throne, executed (born 1649)
- 1750 – Vasily Tatishchev, Russian ethnographer and politician (born 1686)
- 1765 – Charles-André van Loo, French painter (born 1705)
- 1789 – Jacques Duphly, French harpsichord player and composer (born 1715)
- 1828 – Jean-Antoine Houdon, French sculptor (born 1741)
- 1839 – Winthrop Mackworth Praed, English poet and politician (born 1802)
- 1844 – Claude Charles Fauriel, French philologist and historian (born 1772)
- 1851 – Anne-Marie Javouhey, French nun, founder of the Sisters of St Joseph of Cluny (born 1779)
- 1851 – Juan Felipe Ibarra, Argentinian general and politician (born 1787)
- 1857 – Carl Czerny, Austrian pianist and composer (born 1791)
- 1858 – Alexander Andreyevich Ivanov, Russian painter (born 1806)
- 1883 – General Tom Thumb, American circus performer (born 1838)
- 1885 – Rosalía de Castro, Spanish author and poet (born 1837)
- 1890 – Gottfried Keller, Swiss author, poet and playwright (born 1819)
- 1898 – Jean-Baptiste Salpointe, French-American archbishop (born 1825)

=== 1901–present ===
- 1904 – Anton Chekhov, Russian playwright and short story writer (born 1860)
- 1919 – Emil Fischer, German chemist and academic, Nobel Prize laureate (born 1852)
- 1929 – Hugo von Hofmannsthal, Austrian author, poet, and playwright (born 1874)
- 1930 – Leopold Auer, Hungarian violinist, composer, and conductor (born 1845)
- 1930 – Leonora Barry, Irish-born American social activist (born 1849)
- 1931 – Ladislaus Bortkiewicz, Russian-German economist and mathematician (born 1868)
- 1932 – Bahíyyih Khánum, Iranian writer and leader in the Baha'i faith (born 1846)
- 1932 – Cornelis Jacobus Langenhoven, South African poet and politician (born 1873)
- 1933 – Irving Babbitt, American scholar, critic, and academic (born 1865)
- 1933 – Freddie Keppard, American cornet player (born 1890)
- 1940 – Eugen Bleuler, Swiss psychiatrist and physician (born 1857)
- 1940 – Robert Wadlow, American giant, 8"11' 271 cm (born 1918)
- 1942 – Wenceslao Vinzons, Filipino lawyer and politician (born 1910)
- 1944 – Marie-Victorin Kirouac, Canadian botanist and academic (born 1885)
- 1946 – Razor Smith, English cricketer and coach (born 1877)
- 1947 – Walter Donaldson, American soldier and songwriter (born 1893)
- 1948 – John J. Pershing, American general (born 1860)
- 1953 – Geevarghese Mar Ivanios, Indian archbishop, founded the Order of the Imitation of Christ (born 1882)
- 1957 – James M. Cox, American publisher and politician, 46th Governor of Ohio (born 1870)
- 1957 – Vasily Maklakov, a Russian lawyer and politician (born 1869)
- 1959 – Ernest Bloch, Swiss-American composer and academic (born 1880)
- 1959 – Vance Palmer, Australian author and critic (born 1885)
- 1960 – Set Persson, Swedish politician (born 1897)
- 1960 – Lawrence Tibbett, American singer and actor (born 1896)
- 1961 – John Edward Brownlee, Canadian lawyer and politician, 5th Premier of Alberta (born 1884)
- 1961 – Nina Bari, Russian mathematician (born 1901)
- 1965 – Francis Cherry, American lawyer and politician, 35th Governor of Arkansas (born 1908)
- 1966 – Seyfi Arkan, Turkish architect (born 1903)
- 1969 – Grace Hutchins, American labor reformer and researcher (born 1885)
- 1974 – Christine Chubbuck, American journalist (born 1944)
- 1976 – Paul Gallico, American journalist and author (born 1897)
- 1977 – Donald Mackay, Australian businessman and activist (born 1933)
- 1979 – Gustavo Díaz Ordaz, Mexican academic and politician, 29th President of Mexico (born 1911)
- 1981 – Frédéric Dorion, Canadian lawyer, judge, and politician (born 1898)
- 1982 – Bill Justis, American saxophonist, songwriter, and producer (born 1926)
- 1986 – Billy Haughton, American harness racer and trainer (born 1923)
- 1988 – Eleanor Estes, American librarian, author, and illustrator (born 1906)
- 1989 – Laurie Cunningham, English footballer (born 1956)
- 1990 – Zaim Topčić, Yugoslav and Bosnian writer (born 1920)
- 1990 – Margaret Lockwood, English actress (born 1916)
- 1990 – Omar Abu Risha, Syrian poet and diplomat, 4th Syrian Ambassador to the United States (born 1910)
- 1991 – Bert Convy, American actor, singer, and game show host (born 1933)
- 1992 – Hammer DeRoburt, Nauruan educator and politician, 1st President of Nauru (born 1922)
- 1992 – Chingiz Mustafayev, Azerbaijani journalist and author (born 1960)
- 1997 – Justinas Lagunavičius, Lithuanian basketball player (born 1924)
- 1997 – Gianni Versace, Italian fashion designer, founded Versace (born 1946)
- 1998 – S. Shanmuganathan, Sri Lankan politician (born 1960)
- 2000 – Louis Quilico, Canadian opera singer and educator (born 1925)
- 2001 – C. Balasingham, Sri Lankan lawyer and civil servant (born 1917)
- 2003 – Roberto Bolaño, Chilean novelist, short-story writer, poet, and essayist (born 1953)
- 2003 – Elisabeth Welch, American actress and singer (born 1904)
- 2006 – Robert H. Brooks, American businessman, founder of Hooters and Naturally Fresh, Inc. (born 1937)
- 2006 – Alireza Shapour Shahbazi, Iranian archaeologist and academic (born 1942)
- 2008 – György Kolonics, Hungarian canoe racer (born 1972)
- 2010 – James E. Akins, American politician and diplomat, United States Ambassador to Saudi Arabia (born 1926)
- 2011 – Friedrich Wilhelm Schnitzler, German landowner and politician (born 1928)
- 2011 – Googie Withers, British-Australian actress (born 1917)
- 2012 – Boris Cebotari, Moldovan footballer (born 1975)
- 2012 – Tsilla Chelton, Israeli-French actress (born 1919)
- 2012 – Grant Feasel, American football player (born 1960)
- 2012 – David Fraser, English general (born 1920)
- 2012 – Celeste Holm, American actress and singer (born 1917)
- 2012 – Yoichi Takabayashi, Japanese director and screenwriter (born 1931)
- 2013 – Ninos Aho, Syrian-American poet and activist (born 1945)
- 2013 – Henry Braden, American lawyer and politician (born 1944)
- 2013 – Tom Greenwell, American lawyer and judge (born 1956)
- 2013 – Earl Gros, American football player (born 1940)
- 2013 – Noël Lee, Chinese-American pianist and composer (born 1924)
- 2013 – Meskerem Legesse, Ethiopian runner (born 1986)
- 2013 – John T. Riedl, American computer scientist and academic (born 1962)
- 2014 – Óscar Acosta, Honduran author, poet, and diplomat (born 1933)
- 2014 – James MacGregor Burns, American historian, political scientist, and author (born 1918)
- 2014 – Edward Perl, American neuroscientist and academic (born 1926)
- 2014 – Robert A. Roe, American soldier and politician (born 1924)
- 2015 – Masahiko Aoki, Japanese-American economist and academic (born 1938)
- 2015 – Wan Li, Chinese politician, 4th Vice Premier of the People's Republic of China (born 1916)
- 2015 – Aubrey Morris, British actor (born 1926)
- 2015 – Dave Somerville, Canadian singer (born 1933)
- 2017 – Martin Landau, American film and television actor (born 1928)
- 2021 – Peter R. de Vries, Dutch investigative journalist and crime reporter (born 1956)

== Holidays and observances ==
- Christian feast day:
  - Abhai (Syriac Orthodox Church)
  - Anne-Marie Javouhey
  - Bernhard II, Margrave of Baden-Baden
  - Bonaventure
  - Ceslaus
  - Dispersion of the Apostles (formerly by the Catholic Church)
  - Donald of Ogilvy
  - Edith of Polesworth
  - Blessed Inácio de Azevedo
  - Plechelm
  - Quriaqos and Julietta (Eastern Orthodox, Oriental Orthodox)
  - Swithun
  - Vladimir the Great (Eastern Orthodox; Catholic Church)
  - July 15 (Eastern Orthodox liturgics)
- EU Day for the Victims of the Global Climate Crisis (European Union, worldwide)
- Feast of Saint Rosalia (Palermo, Sicily)
- Meänmaa Flag Day (Meänmaa)
- Statehood Day (Ukraine)
