= Abgaryan =

Abgaryan (Armenian: Աբգարյան) is an Armenian surname and may refer to:

- Clara Abgaryan (1916–1996), also known as Clara Abkar, Iranian-born Armenian painter
- Narek Abgaryan (born 1992), Armenian boxer
- Narine Abgaryan (born 1971), USSR-born writer and blogger of Armenian origin
