= Ali Mohammad Afghani =

Iranian writer

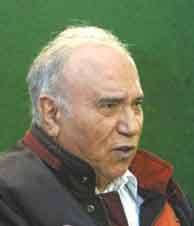
- Ali Afghani in 1999
- Born: 1 January 1925 (age 101); Kermanshah, Iran
- Occupation: Writer
- Writing career
- Notable works: Showhar-e Ahou Khanom (Madam Ahou's Husband); Sindokht; Shadkaman-e Darre-ye Qarrasu (Joyful People of Qarrasu Valley); Shalgham Mive-ye Behesht e (Turnip Is a Paradisal Fruit)
- Movements: Modernism, realism, socialism

Ali Mohammad Afghani (Persian: علی‌محمد افغانی, born 1 January 1925) is an Iranian writer. His father was from Tiran and Karvan, one of the counties of Isfahan province.

== Biography ==
Veteran contemporary writer Ali Mohammad Afghani was born on January 1, 1925, in Kermanshah. He was raised in a poor family. Although a top student, he dropped out of school to work alongside his father. He failed to get employment with the National Iranian Oil Company. He then decided to continue his education. After obtaining a high school diploma, he joined the armed forces and studied at the Military Academy. During that time, the country was experiencing political turmoil. He became a member of the clandestine Officers organization of the Tudeh Party of Iran, comprising some army officers. They were communist and opposed the then-leader of Iran Mohammad Reza Pahlavi. On August 19, 1953, the nationalist government of Mohammad Mosaddeq was overturned through a Shah-backed coup d'état. Activities of the organization were disclosed after Zahedi swept to power, and Afghani was arrested along with several of his colleagues. He was sentenced to life imprisonment but was released after five years due to a commutation.

Afghani turned 100 on 1 January 2025.

== Writing career ==
Afghani wrote his masterpiece Madam Ahou's Husband while in prison and he published his masterpiece in 1961 because no publisher accepted to publish such a long novel written by an unknown writer. Still, after its publication, many famous writers admired it. Literary figures such as the renowned translator Najaf Daryabandari and the prominent author Mohammad Ali Jamalzadeh praised his novel. The novel depicts the appalling life of Iranian women in that era.

Najaf Daryabandari once stated, "Looking into the life of the rabble, the author in this book pictures a painful tragedy. The scenes described in the book are reminiscent of masterpieces written by Leo Tolstoy and Honoré de Balzac. I have never had the same opinion about any other Persian books."

In March 1962, Mohammad-Ali Jamalzadeh, in a letter to a friend, wrote, "I received Madam Ahou’s Husband. I think fellow writers and I should kiss goodbye writing. Iran is a bizarre country. It nurtures talented youth in no time. What a wonderful book! Such descriptive images."

In 1965, Afghani published his second novel, Joyful People of Qarrasu Valley. The book is about the love of a poor boy for the daughter of the village lord. It also depicts the political currents of the post-1941 period.

Woven of Grief, Sindokht, and Cousin Parvin are some of his works he has done. His forthcoming books are Fathers’ World; Children’s World and a novel on the Iran-Iraq War.

=== Works and publications ===
- Afghani, Ali Mohammad (1968). Madam Ahou's Husband (Showhar-e Ahou Khanom). p. 800. ISBN 978-9-643-51110-4.
- Afghani, Ali Mohammad (1988). بافته‌های رنج - Baftehaye Ranj. Negah. ISBN 978-9-643-51602-4.
- Doctor Baktash 1989
- Sindokht
- Sentenced To Death 2000
- Mahku ba A'dam 1993
- Afghani, Ali Mohammad (2016). Sara the Actress. Dorrance Publishing Co. Inc. ISBN 978-1-480-93162-6.
- Shuhara Hokhanem
- Turnip Is a Paradisal Fruit
- Afghani, Ali Mohammad (2016). Moon above the Frontline. Dorrance Publishing Co. Inc. ISBN 978-1-480-93163-3.
- Afghani, Ali Mohammad (2015). Tragedy of King Nader-Shah. Dorrance Publishing. p. 182. ISBN 978-1-480-91145-1.
- Woven of Grief
- Cousin Parvin

== External references ==
- Ali Mohammad Afghani IMDb
- Afġāni, ʿAli Moḥammad: Šouhar-e Āhu-Ḫānom
