= Nor Burastan Cemetery =

Armenian Christian cemetery in Tehran, Iran

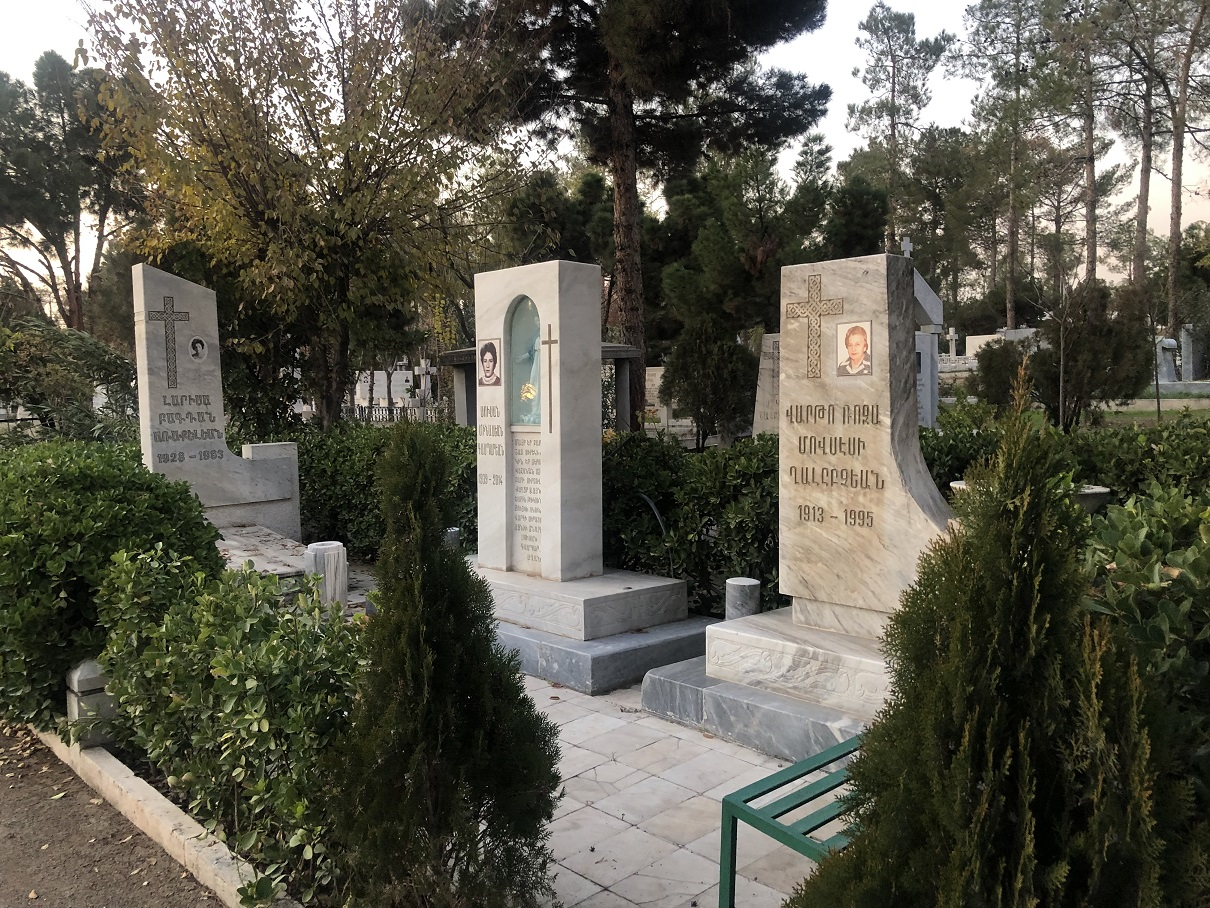
- Nor Burastan Cemetery in 2019
- Interactive map of Nor Burastan Cemetery

Details
- Location: Tehran, Iran
- Type: Armenian Church

Nor Burastan Cemetery (Persian: گورستان ارامنه تهران, lit. 'Tehran Armenian Cemetery'; Armenian: Թեհրանի Նոր Բուրաստան Գերեզմանատուն), also known as the Christian Armenian Burastan Cemetery, is the major Armenian cemetery located in southeast of Tehran. It was established in 1974 by the St. Stephen Chapel (hy), in Tehran.

== Notable burials ==
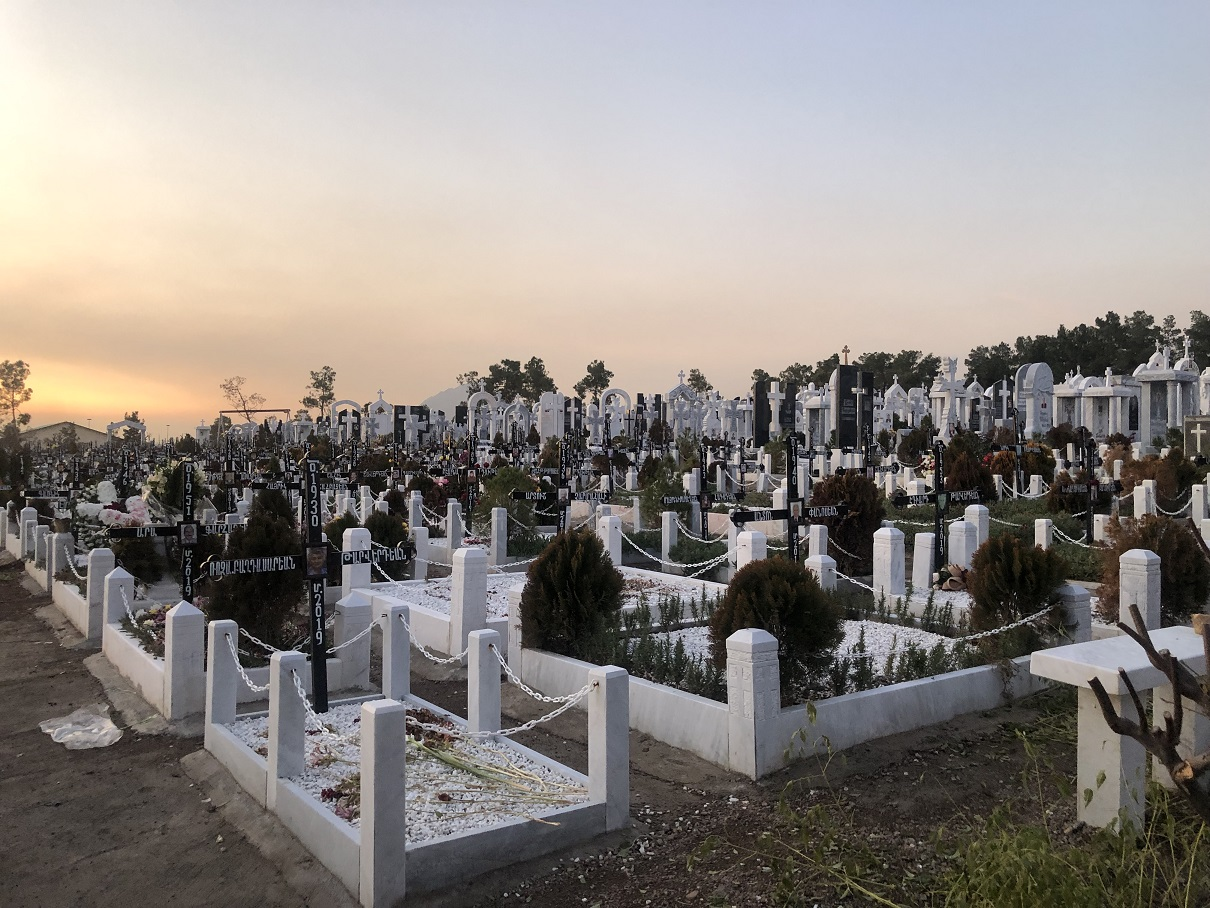
View of Nor Burastan Cemetery

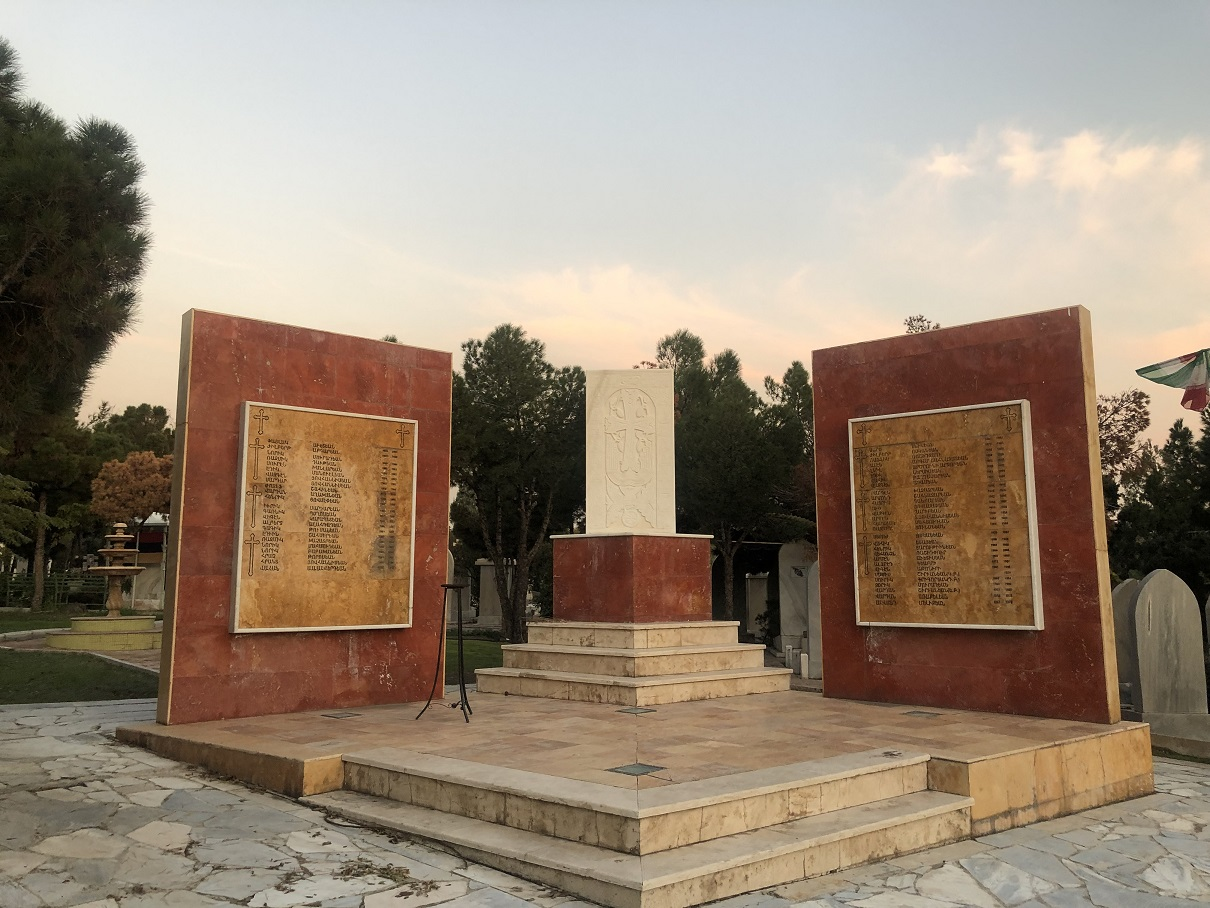
War memorial for the Iran–Iraq War veterans, Nor Burastan Cemetery

- Varoujan Hakhbandian (Վարուժան Հախբանդեան) (1936–1977) – musician
- Suren Arakelian (Սուրէն Առաքելեան) (fa) (1887–1979) – musician
- Arman Hovsepian (Արամայիս Հովսէփեան) (1921–1980) – actor
- Zorik Moradian (Զորիկ Մուրադեան) (fa) (1960–1980) – war martyr
- Vartan Hovanessian (Վարդան Յովհանիսեան) (1896–1982) – architect
- Razmik Minassian (Ռազմիկ Մինասեան) (1942–1985) – architect
- Vigen Karapetian (Վիգէն Կարապետեան) (fa) (1965–1987) – war martyr
- Hrair Khalatian (Հրայր Խալաթեան) (fa) (1929–1988) – politician
- Salma Gouyoumjian (Սալմա Գույումճեան) (fa) (1907–1990) – archaeologist
- Elbis Ferahian (Էլբիս Ֆերահեան) (fa) (1907–1994) – educator
- Haik Hovsepian Mehr (Հայկ Հովսէփեան Մեհր) (1945–1994), bishop of the Jama'at-e Rabbani church
- Clara Abkar (Կլարա Աբգար) (1916–1996) – painter, also known as Clara Abgar
- Henrik Tamraz (Յենրիկ Թամրազ) (1935–1996) – weightlifter
- Samuel Khachikian (Սամուէլ Խաչիկեան) (1923–2001), film director
- Emanuel Melik-Aslanian (Էմանուէլ Մելիք-Ասլանեան) (1915–2003) – musician
- Lorik Minassian (Լորիկ Մինասեան) (fa) (1944–2004) – actress
- Martik Ter-Avanessian (Մարտիկ Տէր-Ավանեսեան) (ru) (1937–2009) – physician
- Levon Davidian (Լևոն Դաւթեան) (1944–2009) – politician
- Caro Lucas (Կարո Լուկաս Ղուկասեան) (1949–2010) – scholar
- Alenush Terian (Ալենուշ Տէրեան) (1921–2011) – astronomer and physicist
- Valodya Tarkhanian (Վալոդյա Թարխանեան) (fa) (1925–2012) – musician
- Irene Zazians (Իրեն Զազեանց) (1927–2012) – actress
- Henry Johanes (Հենրի Ջոհանէս) (fa) (1932–2014) – tennis player
- Janet Lazarian (Ժանետ Լազարեան) (fa) (1940–2014) – author
- Bergrouni Poghosian (Բերգունի Պօղոսեան) (fa) (1948–2014) – filmmaker
- Robert Avetisian (Ռոբերտ Աւետիսեան) (fa) (1966–2014) – war veteran
- Andranik Hovian (Անդրանիկ Հովուեան) (fa) (1933–2015) – scholar
- Nshan Tanik (Նշան Թանիկ) (fa) (1949–2015) – sculptor
- Garnik Yadegarian (Գարնիկ Եադեգարեան) (fa) (1960–2015) – filmmaker
- Levon Haftvan (Լևոն Հաֆթվան) (fa) (1966–2018) – actor
- Lilit Teryan (Լիլիթ Տէրեան) (1930–2019) – sculptor
- Gurgen Grigorians (Գուրգէն Գրիգորեանս) (fa) (1933–2020) – film editor
- Serj Avagian (Սերժ Աւագեան) (fa) (1938–2020) – painter
- Serjik Teymourian (Սերժիկ Թէյմուրեան) (1974–2020) – football player
- Albert Minassian/Almin (Ալբերտ Մինասեան) (fa) (1952–2021) – writer
- Zhānit D. Lazāryān (Ժանետ Տիգրանուհի Լազարյան) (fa) (1940–2014) – writer
