= Zhānit D. Lazāryān =

Iranian-Armenian writer (1940–2014)

- Born: 1940; Tehran, Iran
- Died: 26 August 2014 (aged 73-74); Tehran
- Education: Royal College of Art
- Occupations: Journalist; Writer
- Spouse: Najaf Daryabandari

Janet Digharanouhi Lazarian (Persian: ژانت د. لازاریان; 1940–2014) was an Iranian-Armenian researcher, journalist, and gallery owner. She was the first wife of Iranian writer and translator Najaf Daryabandari.

== Education ==
She was born in 1940 in Tehran to a family of Armenian immigrants originally from Nakhichevan. She completed her primary education in Tehran and Isfahan before moving to London to attend the Royal College of Art for further studies.

== Career ==
In 1963, Lazarian began collaborating with هفته‌نامهٔ فردوسی ( Ferdowsi Magazine) as Iran's first music critic. She headed the arts and culture section of the English-language Tehran times for ten years. In 1998, at the invitation of the International Congress of Armenian Women in Paris, she participated in the event's journalism section as the sole Iranian-Armenian journalist.

Lazarian was invited to collaborate on the compilation and writing of the Encyclopedia of Armenians in Iran a project that was finally published in 2003. She also managed the Lazar Gallery in Tehran.

== Death ==
She passed away at her home in Tehran on 26 August 2014, at the age of 74, following a period of illness; her remains were laid to rest at the Nor Burastan Cemetery.

== Publications ==
- دانشنامه ایرانیان ارمنی: شرح حال مشاهیر ارمنی: نمایندگان مجلس، پژوهشگران ... و مشاهیر ارمنی ساکن ارمنستان. به همراه تاریخ اجتماعی اقتصادی ارامنهٔ معاصر و جغرافیای تاریخی ارمنستان - انتشارات هیرمند (مرکز بین‌المللی گفتگوی تمدنها) ۱۳۸۲ (Encyclopedia of Iranian Armenians: Biographies of prominent Armenians, including members of parliament, researchers, and others, as well as notable Armenians residing in Armenia. Includes the socio-economic history of contemporary Armenians and the historical geography of Armenia. Hirmand Publications (International Center for Dialogue Among Civilizations) 2003.
