= Caspian Airlines Flight 7908 =

2009 aviation accident in Iran

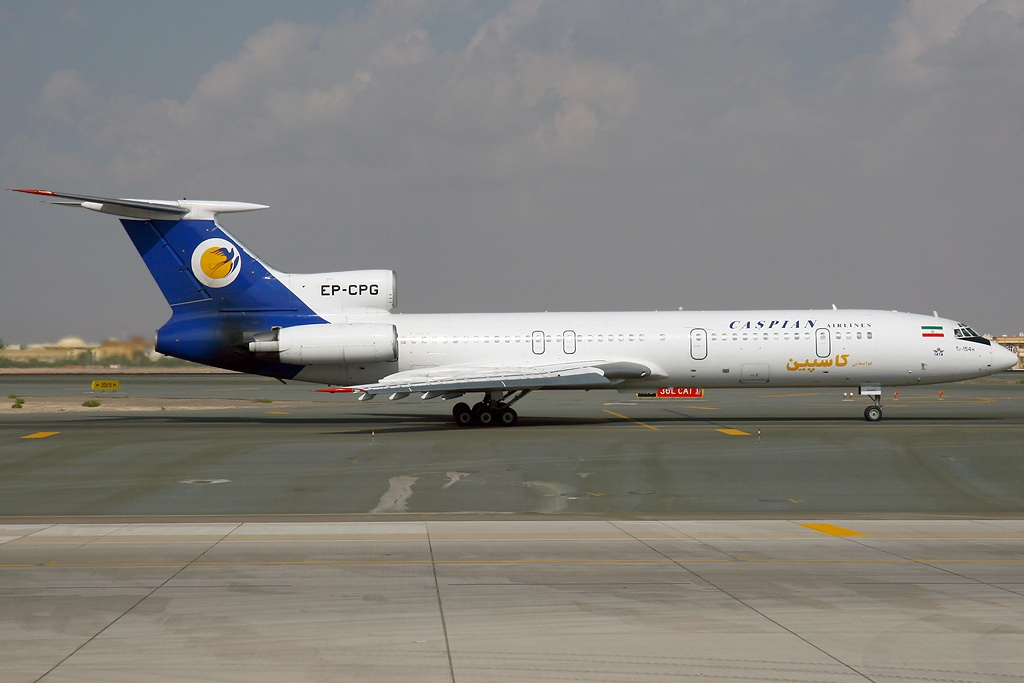
- EP-CPG, the aircraft involved, photographed in 2008

Accident
- Date: 15 July 2009
- Summary: Uncontained engine failure leading to loss of control
- Site: Jannatabad, Qazvin, Iran; 36°8′33″N 49°59′39″E

Aircraft
- Aircraft type: Tupolev Tu-154M
- Operator: Caspian Airlines
- IATA flight No.: IV7908
- ICAO flight No.: CPN7908
- Call sign: CASPIAN 7908
- Registration: EP-CPG
- Flight origin: Tehran Imam Khomeini International Airport, Tehran, Iran
- Destination: Zvartnots International Airport, Yerevan, Armenia
- Occupants: 168
- Passengers: 153
- Crew: 15
- Fatalities: 168
- Survivors: 0

Caspian Airlines Flight 7908 was a scheduled commercial flight from Tehran, Iran, to Yerevan, Armenia, that crashed near the village of Jannatabad, outside the city of Qazvin in north-western Iran, on 15 July 2009. All 153 passengers and 15 crew members on board died.

The subsequent crash investigation found that the incident had been caused by fatigue failure and consequent disintegration of a rotor disc in the left hand engine (engine No. 1). Fragments of the disc severed two of the three hydraulic control systems and damaged fuel lines for the center engine (engine No. 2). Fuel leaking from these damaged lines ignited, causing a large fire. The engine failure also severed the control rods on the tail of the plane, resulting in the pilots losing control of the aircraft.

== Aircraft ==
The aircraft was a Tupolev Tu-154M built in 1987 and operated by Iran's Caspian Airlines. The aircraft had registration EP-CPG, an aircraft which entered service on 20 April 1987 as YA-TAR for Bakhtar Afghan Airlines and was sold to Ariana Afghan Airlines in 1988. YA-TAR served with Ariana Afghan until sold to Caspian Airlines on 15 March 1998, 11 years after it was built. It was re-registered as EP-CPG in 1999.

At the time of the accident, the aircraft had accumulated 27,510 flight hours and 16,813 cycles. Its last major overhaul had been performed on 18 March 2005. Following the overhaul, it had completed 9,888 hours and 6,581 cycles up to one day before the accident. The aircraft was checked for safety in June 2009 and was given a flight license until 2010. According to an Armenian aviation official, the plane had gone through technical controls in Mineralnye Vody Airport in southern Russia in June.

=== Engine history ===
The aircraft was equipped with three Soloviev D-30KU-154-II twin-shaft, low-bypass turbofan engines. The engines were configured in the standard Tu-154M arrangement: engine no.1 on a pylon on the left rear of the fuselage, engine no.3 on a pylon on the right rear, and engine no.2 mounted in the tail.

No. 1 engine was manufactured in 1992 and had been used for a total of 17,726 flight hours and 9,117 cycles. It was installed on the aircraft in September 2008. Its last overhaul was conducted in November 2007. According to official calculations, the engine had been used for 3,911 hours and 1,843 cycles since its last overhaul. Engine no. 2 was manufactured in 1993 and had accumulated a total of 16,060 flight hours and had undergone a total of 6,669 cycles. It was last overhauled in February 2008. No. 3 engine was considerably the youngest, as it was manufactured in 1994 and had a total of 9,507 flight hours and a total of 3,718 flight cycles. It was overhauled in September 2008, the latest among the other two.

== Passengers and crew ==
=== Passengers ===
Nationality	Total
Iran	157
Armenia	5
Georgia	2
Canada	2
Australia	2
Total	168

The aircraft was carrying 168 people on board, consisted of 153 passengers and 15 crew members. Officials stated that majority of those on board were Iranians, however the exact number were not announced. Reports stated that there were 40 Armenians on board. Iranian state-news agency FARS stated that there were 47 Armenians on board, without specifying the exact number of Armenian citizens. The Government of Armenia later confirmed that while there were at least 40 ethnic Armenians, only five of them were Armenian citizens, consisting of three passengers and two crew members. The remainder were Armenians of Iranian citizenship.

The Georgian embassy in Yerevan confirmed that two of its staff were on board. Canadian authorities confirmed that two Canadians who held dual nationality were on the flight. Meanwhile, the Australian government stated that at least two Iranians with dual Iranian-Australian nationality were on board the aircraft. Beside the listed foreigners, the deputy chairman of Armenia's civil aviation authority, Arsen Pogosian, stated that the rest were Iranian citizens.

Among the passengers were Levon Davidian, a former member of Iranian parliament and a prominent figure for the Armenians in Iran, and Iranian composer Abdolreza (Abdi) Yamini, who was going to a concert held by Ebi in Yerevan. Also on board were 10 members of Iran's national junior judo team, consisting of eight athletes and two coaches. The team was heading to a training camp in Yerevan in preparation for the upcoming judo competition in Budapest, Hungary.

=== Crew ===
There were discrepancies regarding the official number of the crew. The Iranian government-owned news agency FARS and Armenian press stated that there were 15 crew members, with the following being listed as the cockpit crew members:

- Captain Ali Asghar Shir Akbari (53), who was also acting as the instructor pilot during the flight. He had accumulated 10,700 total flight hours. He was type-rated on the Fokker F-28 and Tupolev Tu-154M and had passed his most recent simulator check on 26 June 2009. In Flight 7908, Akbari was originally not supposed to be on the flight; however, he was called in as a substitute for another instructor pilot.
- Pilot Mahdi Firouse Souheil (55), who was the pilot flying and was under supervision of Akbari. He had accrued a total flying experience of 6,700 total flight hours. Graduated from a piloting college in the United States in 1976, he was type-rated on the Boeing 707 and Tupolev Tu-154M. His license recorded that he had completed 240 of his required 250 supervised flight hours, meaning he had only 10 hours of supervised flight remaining before he could be released to unsupervised captain duties. He was seated on the left side during the flight.
- First Officer Javad Masoumi Hesari (33), who was acting as the pilot non-flying and co-pilot for Souheil, seated on the right side. He had a total of 1,850 total flight hours, but only 250 of those were on the Tupolev Tu-154M.
- Flight Engineer Nima Salehie Rezve (28), who had a total of 320 flight engineer hours.

The Armenian government stated that there were also two flight engineers from Armenia, identified as Gregory Barseghyan and Suren Soghomonyan. The Russian embassy in Iran stated that preliminary reports indicated that there were no Russians on board the flight. The final investigation report stated that there was a Russian-speaking flight engineer in the cockpit, whose voice was recorded by the aircraft's CVR. The identity of the crew, however, was not disclosed in detail, nor could it be confirmed that the person was of Russian nationality.

== Accident ==
=== Flight history ===
Tehran, the origin of the flight, and Qazvin, where the aircraft crashed

Flight 7908 was an international scheduled passenger flight from Imam Khomeini International Airport in Tehran to Zvartnots International Airport in the Armenian capital of Yerevan. The flight was a regularly scheduled flight and was frequented by Iranian Armenians; many were visiting relatives in Armenia. The flight was supposed to take about 1 hour and 20 minutes with a cruise altitude of 34,000 feet (10,363 m) at 450 knots (232 m/s; 833 km/h; 518 mph). On 15 July 2009, the aircraft was boarded with 158 passengers and 10 crew members, piloted by Mahdi Firouse Souheil as the pilot flying and his co-pilot Javad Masoumi Hesari. Souheil was supervised by an instructor pilot, Captain Ali Asghar Shir Akbari, who was seated on the back.

The aircraft had been delayed for 1 hour and 30 minutes due to poor pre-flight preparation. At 11:39 a.m, the aircraft took off from Tehran's Runway 11 and climbed. The autopilot was then engaged and the aircraft proceeded to climb to 6,000 feet (1,829 m) before starting its turn towards its first waypoint "PAROT". Flight 7908 was then handed off to Tehran's area control center and was eventually told to proceed to an altitude of 34,000 feet.

00:34:09 (Note: The time shown here is based on the elapsed duration since the CVR began recording. The final report did not include the exact local time for this particular conversation.)	Tehran Approach	"CPN7908, Contact control 119.3"
00:34:09	First Officer Hesari	"Contact 119.3 CPN7908, have a nice day"
00:34:19	First Officer Hesari	"Tehran radar, CPN7908 squawk 1523"
00:34:26	Tehran ACC	"CPN7908 good morning, radar contact climb FL340"
00:34:33	First Officer Hesari	"Climbing 340, CPN7908"
00:34:36	Unidentified crew	Don't get tired!
00:34:38	First Officer Hesari	Same to you, Sir.

This was the last transmission from Flight 7908 to Tehran ATC. At 11:51 a.m, approximately 16 minutes into the flight, the aircraft reached its cruising altitude. Pilot Soheil could be heard in the recording saying "Take it, take it", meaning that he was giving the flight control duties to First Officer Hesari, which was responded with "I have it". After a while, he ordered the crew to gather information regarding the flight parameters and other data.

11:51:37	Pilot Soheil	Take it, take it.
11:51:42	First Officer Hesari	I have it.
11:51:51	Pilot Soheil	Ok, gather information.

=== Accident ===
At 11:52 a.m, at 28,800 feet (8,778 m), the aircraft was on a cruise climb when a thump was heard from behind the aircraft, with a sound consistent of an object impacting the aircraft that could be heard in the cockpit recording. The aircraft suddenly tilted to the left, however the crew didn't react to it. Few seconds later, the parameters for engine No.1 suddenly became abnormal. The rotor speed of the low pressure compressor had increased from 84% to 99.3%. Few seconds later, the rotor speed jumped to 120%, and the fuel flow of the engine dropped fast. A loud bang was then heard from the rear fuselage, shaking the aircraft and causing it to roll slightly to the left. Then, it started losing altitude.

11:52:12	Unidentified crew	Он может гореть! (It's catching fire!)
11:52:15	First Officer Hesari	This [person] says to shut [the engine] down
11:52:19	Pilot Soheil	Shut it down
11:52:22	First Officer Hesari	Shut it down, sir

Meanwhile, the aircraft continued to turn to the left, reaching an angle of 64°. The pilots tried to counteract it by making a right bank input through the rudder pedal; however, the aircraft didn't budge. The aircraft kept banking at such an angle, and the pilots pressed the pedals even harder. Their attempts seemed to have no effect. Even after fully applying the pedals, the aircraft kept turning towards the left. As it was in a nose-down attitude, the aircraft kept losing its height and started to gain more speed.

Soheil desperately tried to turn the aircraft to the right, saying "Turn! Turn!" while struggling. Realizing the gravity of the situation, First Officer Hesari asked Soheil on whether he should declare an emergency, to which Soheil responded firmly "no". Seconds later, the "engine fire" alarm blared. The Russian-speaking crew informed the rest that the engine was on fire. The pilots were still preoccupied with the control of the aircraft as it kept diving towards the ground.

11:52:47	Pilot Soheil	Turn! Turn!
11:52:52	First Officer Hesari	Should I declare [emergency], Captain?
11:52:53	Pilot Soheil	No
11:52:59	Unidentified crew	Звуковой сигнал! (engine fire signal!)

External videos
- Radar recording
- Radar playback of Flight 7908 on YouTube

While the aircraft plummeted towards the ground, Tehran ATC suddenly sent a transmission for a routine check-in on the flight. Taking his own initiative, flight engineer Rezve, without authorization from the pilots, quickly said, "Mayday, Mayday, Mayday, engine failure!" This message, however, didn't reach the ATC for an unknown reason. The ATC worker remained unaware of the situation on board the flight. As the ground drew nearer and the aircraft undoubtedly could not be controlled, First Officer Hesari said, "Oh no!". This would be the last words recorded from the cockpit.

11:53:03	Tehran ACC	CPN7908, Tehran
11:53:19	Flight Engineer Rezve	Mayday Mayday Mayday! Engine failure!
11:53:24	First Officer Hesari	Oh no!
11:53:26	Tehran ACC	CPN7908, do you read?
	Commmentary	End of recording

At 11:54 a.m, the aircraft's blip disappeared from the radar screen. The last time it appeared on screen, the aircraft was spiraling with a left bank. Eyewitnesses on the ground reported that fire could be seen on the rear of the aircraft with smokes spewing out and trailing on the back. Approximately 30 - 40 seconds after the CVR last recording, the aircraft crashed onto the ground in high speed in the village of Jannatabad, approximately 7 nautical miles (13 km; 8.1 mi) from Qazvin, ending in a massive explosion. All 168 passengers and crews were killed instantly on impact.

=== Immediate aftermath ===
Authorities in Qazvin was immediately notified on the disappearance of Flight 7908. Calls were eventually received from residents living near the crash site, in Jannatabad, approximately 145 kilometres (90 mi) from Tehran. They stated that a large plane had crashed onto an open field nearby. Two helicopters were immediately deployed to scour for survivors, but a quick flyby suggested that no survivors were expected from the crash. The impact with the ground left a 10-metre-deep (33 ft) crater and the debris was spread over 200 square metres (2,200 ft^{2}) wide. The aircraft was completely destroyed with only several significantly large debris could be found, indicating a high-energy impact with the ground. According to officials, no victims were recovered intact, adding that they mostly recovered fingers and smaller organs from the site.

A total of 20 ambulances and 50 personnel from Qazvin's Red Crescent were eventually deployed to the crash site. Members of the Iranian Air Force was quickly called in to assist the team. The site quickly became restricted and officials cordoned the area off as authorities began to search the aircraft's flight recorders. Onlookers were removed from the area and technical experts were brought in. Excavators had to be used to clear the debris.

== Response ==
=== Government response ===
The Armenian foreign ministry quickly set up a hotline for the families of the victims in Zvartnots Airport. An information station was also established at the airport with psychological and medical assistance provided by authorities. Families of the victims were ushered onto the room to confirm the identities of those who were on board the aircraft. A total of 17 ambulance calls were made from Zvartnots. Meanwhile, one family member was taken to a hospital due to nervous breakdown. Calls for ambulances were also made from the homes of the relatives.

President of Armenia Serzh Sargsyan cut short his trip to Spitak following the news of the crash and immediately headed to Yerevan. The government decided to create a commission to provide the necessary assistance for the families of the Armenian citizens who boarded the flight, which would be led by Deputy Prime Minister of Armenia Armen Gevorgyan. A special Iran Air Boeing 747 flight was organized to take relatives of the Armenian victims from Yerevan to Tehran and later to the crash site. The Georgian embassy also announced that the relatives of the two Georgians on board would also travel to the site. A memorial service was eventually held at the site, which was attended by multiple officials from Armenia and Iran, including the Armenian diocese of Tehran, Sepuh Sargsyan, and representatives from the Armenian community of Iran.

FARS reported that the next of kin would be given an unspecified amount of compensations provided by the nation's largest insurance company, the Iran Insurance Company, as the aircraft was insured by the corporation. Caspian Airlines spokesperson announced that families of each victims will be given around 32,000 euros in compensations. The Armenian government, meanwhile, announced that a total of $4,100 would be provided for the families of the Armenian victims. They also added that accommodations and funeral would be fully covered by Caspian Airlines. Payments began to be distributed by 23 July, amounting to a total of USD $49,000 per victims.

On 16 July, the Armenian parliament session was opened with a minute of silence for the victims of the crash. The government later stated that all necessary assistance would be provided for the families. Ministry of Labor and Social Affairs would handle the funeral cost of the victims and the Armenian Ministry of Finance would open a temporary off-budget account to collect funds raised from individuals and legal entities.

On 21 July, due to lack of transparency from Caspian Airlines, a group of relatives of the victims protested in front of Caspian Airlines main headquarters in Iran. The group demanded clarity and issued a 14-point resolution addressed to the airline. The group also heavily criticized Iranian authorities for lack of response, stating that Iranian ministers had been absent from the scene. The demonstration was mainly peaceful, though one photojournalist was briefly detained for taking pictures of the protest.

=== Memorial ===
Iranian president Mahmoud Ahmadinejad and Armenian President Serzh Sargsyan expressed their sympathies for the deceased and their families. On that same day, a period of three days of national mourning was declared by Armenia after a decree declaring a national day of mourning was signed. Both countries had phoned each other to offer their condolences and stated that both would coordinate with each other regarding matters that were needed to be done during the disaster. In Armenia, flags would be flown at half-mast throughout the country and on their embassies abroad and radio and television stations would not air entertainment programs for the day. In Iran, the Armenian Diocese of Iran declared three days of mourning, though an official day of mourning was not declared by Iranian officials.

Several foreign leaders conveyed their condolences to the Armenian and Iranian government. (Note: Afghanistan, Azerbaijan, Belarus, Bahrain, the European Union, France, Germany, Kazakhstan, Kuwait, Lebanon, the Holy See, the UAE, the United States, Russia, and Turkey.) The National Olympic Committees of Brazil and Hungary also extended their condolences to their Iranian counterpart. Head of World Judo Federation, Marius Weiser, expressed his condolences to the victims and stated that in honor of the disaster a minute of silence would be held prior to the start of the judo competitions in Budapest. In Lebanon, a memorial service was held by the Iranian embassy in Beirut. The service was attended by Hezbollah and several Lebanese and Iranian officials. In Yerevan, the Armenian Ministry of Foreign Affairs set up a book of condolences for the victims.

The Armenian government stated that a dedicated memorial would be held on 18 July in the Mother Cathedral of Holy Etchmiadzin and would be presided by Garegin II, the supreme head of the Armenian Apostolic Church. In response to the crash, the Armenian community in West Azerbaijan announced that the annual pilgrimage ceremony in Monastery of Saint Thaddeus would not be held this year. On 19 July, Iranian Armenians held an official memorial service in Saint Sarkis Church in Tehran. The service was attended by hundreds of Armenian Christians, members of the Iranian parliament, Armenian Prime Minister Tigran Sargsyan, and the former speaker of the Iran Majlis, Mehdi Karroubi. Another funeral service would be held on the next day, attended by Caspian Airlines' officials.

Due to the deaths of the judokas and their coaches, the Iranian government announced that all of their bodies would be buried in Tehran's Behesht-e-Zahra, the nation's largest cemetery complex. The funeral service was conducted with their caskets displayed in front of Tehran's Shahid Shiroudi Sports Complex, where they would later be transported to the cemetery. The service was attended by the nation's sport officials and members of the public. A symbolic game to honor the memories of the judokas was held in Budapest in August. Before it began, it would be preceded by a minute of silence before ending with a symbolic handover of gold plaques for the Iranian judokas.

To show solidarity with the victims of the crash, Iranian based Esteghlal F.C. announced that they would play a friendly match with then-winner of the Armenian Premier League FC Pyunik in Tehran's Dastgerdi Stadium, hosted by Caspian Airlines. Football Federation of Armenia, however, prohibited Pyunik players from flying into Iran and subsequently had to be replaced by a football team from Nagorno-Karabakh instead.

=== Judo controversy ===
There were reports that several members of the judo team had boarded the aircraft using false identities. This was revealed after the name of those on the boarding pass didn't match with the actual person who was holding them. The issue was noted on three judokas who hailed from Lorestan. The Iranian Judo Federation initially dismissed the issue and reaffirmed that their identities were correct. The caretaker head of the federation, Alireza Amini, reiterated that the reported judokas had been using the same identities since they joined the Iranian judo scene. Following the discovery, Iranian authorities stated that further investigation would be conducted.

A delegation was sent by the Iranian General Inspection Office for the matter. Accordingly, a committee would be established to investigate the judokas' real identities. The preliminary investigation indicated that the listed names were actually the names of their family members instead of the judokas. The ones whose names were listed on the flight are actually alive. The issues eventually spread onto other things, including ID cards fraud and underage judokas in multiple competitions, and that the issues had been happening for years. Then head of Iranian judo, Alireza Amini, was criticized for downplaying the issue. Iran's General Inspection Office, however, stated that the Judo Federation had not committed documents forgery prior to the flight, though they added that all sports federations would be reminded about the same issues.

In response to the result of the investigation, authorities decided to halt the registration for the upcoming election of the new head of judo federation, stating that the candidates, including Alireza Amini, might have been needed to be investigated further. Discord was eventually reported within the federation as members resigned and others demanded the Iranian government to force officials from the Judo Federation to drop their positions and to dismiss several candidates' presidency race. The scandal eventually stretched until 2010, during the official election for the next head of Iranian Judo Federation in January. Only selected members were allowed to vote, and several key prominent figures in the federation were reportedly barred from entering the building to cast their votes. Amini was eventually elected as the head of the federation.

== Investigation ==
Armenian President Serzh Sargsyan announced on 15 July that a governmental commission had been set up to investigate the crash, led by Deputy Prime Minister Armen Gevorgyan. The investigation would be led by Iran and assisted by Russia's Interstate Aviation Committee (IAC) as the manufacturer of the plane. The investigation would likely take months to complete. The aircraft's cockpit voice recorder and flight data recorder were found on 15 July. However, one of the "black boxes" was reported by Chief Investigator Ahmad Majidi to be damaged. Both flight recorders were successfully accessed and contributed data to the accident investigation. The third black box was eventually found on the next day and would be sent to Russia for further analysis.

=== Engine failure ===
Multiple eyewitnesses reported that the engines could be seen on fire before the aircraft impacted the ground, suggesting that the crash might have been caused by an in-flight engine failure. Examination of the wreckage confirmed that fragments of the aircraft's engine, specifically from the no. 1 engine, could be found approximately 2 kilometers from the main wreckage. Meanwhile, parts of the other engines, engine No. 2 and engine No. 3, were found near the main wreckage, indicating that both engines had not disintegrated mid-flight. The recovered engine No. 1 was missing its low-pressure turbine section, and the engine shaft itself was cut approximately at the end of the high-pressure turbine. These findings pointed towards a destructive engine failure in flight.

The engine was subsequently shipped to Russia for detailed investigation. Russian investigators identified fatigue cracks in the titanium-alloy first-stage low-pressure compressor disc. The cracks were located at the blade attachment region of the disc, where the compressor blades anchor into the rim, likely due to stress concentrations at that location which accumulate with each flight cycle. These subsurface cracks grew undetected over a long period. With no instruments available to the crew capable of detecting them, the cracks continued to grow without anyone's knowledge. Once a crack reached its critical size, it propagated extremely rapidly to a complete fracture. The disc failed, causing the engine to overspeed before it disintegrated completely under the tremendous centrifugal forces involved.

The flight recorders of EP-CPG further corroborated the findings. On the CVR recording, the separation of the disc was heard as an initial thump, to which the crew did not immediately react. The FDR recording, which captured the flight parameters, showed that engine No. 1 speed gradually increased from 84% to 99.3% before rapidly jumping to 120.7% within a span of about two seconds. The engine then suffered an uncontained failure, in which its disintegrating components broke through the engine casing and struck the aircraft. Following this, a fire developed in the rear compartment of the aircraft, fed by fuel and hydraulic fluid leaking from lines that the debris had ruptured. The aircraft began to lose control almost as soon as the engine failed.

According to the engines' logbooks, Engine No. 1 was the oldest of the three and had accumulated the highest number of flight cycles. Manufactured in 1992, it had logged 17,726 flight hours and 9,117 cycles, and had also been in service longest since its last overhaul. The commission concluded that once the fatigue cracks reached a critical size, the disc could fail completely within as few as 12 additional flight cycles. Following the accident, the engine manufacturer determined that engines whose low-pressure compressors had exceeded 8,000 flight cycles were no longer airworthy and required replacement of the disc.

=== Loss of control ===
In Flight 7908, the left engine failed destructively such that the fragments penetrated and severed the control rods of the rudder.

During the flight, fatigue cracking caused a section of the engine's disc to detach, resulting in a catastrophic engine failure. Because the flight control rods and hydraulic lines ran through a rear fuselage compartment adjacent to engine No. 1, the uncontained destruction of the engine severed these components, disabling the aircraft's controls.

The sequence began when a section of the first-stage low-pressure compressor disc of Engine No. 1 broke away. The loss of material caused the disc to separate from its axis, immediately unbalancing the rotor. With each rotation, the imbalance generated increasingly severe vibrations. The rotor rapidly accelerated into an overspeed condition and eventually disintegrated. The engine was destroyed, and its turbine section separated from the shaft. Because the failure involved the disc rather than the blades, the released fragments carried energy far beyond what the engine casing was designed to contain, and they escaped the engine and entered the rear fuselage.

The rear of the Tupolev Tu-154 consisted of several compartments housing essential flight control systems, fuel lines, and parts of the engines. Among the nearest to engine No. 1 was Rear Compartment No. 5, which contained the engine No. 2 fuel line, multiple hydraulic tubes, and the push-pull control rods for the elevator and rudder. The hydraulic system powered the aircraft's controls, while the control rods formed the mechanical link between the pilots' inputs and the flight-control surfaces.

In Flight 7908, the energy from the failing engine was sufficient for the debris to penetrate the rear fuselage and sever multiple lines and rods inside the compartment. The fragments cut the No. 1 and No. 3 hydraulic system lines and ruptured the engine No. 2 fuel line. Escaping hydraulic fluid and fuel came into contact with hot engine debris, igniting a fire inside the compartment. Although the aircraft's fire-extinguishing system could protect the engines themselves, it was not designed to suppress a fire in this compartment, allowing the blaze to burn unchecked.

With the mechanical linkages to the elevator and rudder severed, the crew lost the ability to control the aircraft. Because engine No. 1 was mounted on the left side, its failure created asymmetric thrust that caused the aircraft to yaw and roll to the left, with the bank angle gradually increasing. The pilots attempted to counter this with right rudder input, but their commands could not reach the control surfaces because the connecting rods had been severed. This was reflected in the FDR data, which showed the crew applying maximum right rudder while the aircraft failed to respond. The loss of control ultimately caused the aircraft to crash.

=== Oversight lapses ===
The manufacturer of the Soloviev D-30KU engine had been aware of the fatigue cracking problem for years. The issue stemmed from recurring problems with the continued operation of this engine type, particularly involving the first-stage low-pressure compressor disc. The manufacturer had issued multiple directives in the past to address the problem, but these had not prevented it from recurring. Earlier bulletins relied on general visual inspection to detect cracks, whereas a later directive required operators to use non-destructive testing (NDT) employing eddy current and dye-penetrant methods.

This updated bulletin was circulated only among Russian and Commonwealth of Independent States (CIS) operators, and was mandatory only for them; operators elsewhere were not informed of the change. Because Caspian Airlines had not received the updated inspection requirement, it continued to follow the previously established procedure of visual inspection. The cracks, located beneath the surface and effectively invisible to the naked eye, consequently grew undetected.

Six days after the disaster, the manufacturer issued the equivalent directive to Iran. The rest of Caspian Airlines' Tu-154 fleet was subsequently inspected using the NDT method, which revealed that no other aircraft had the same defect as the one involved in the crash. The following year, the manufacturer extended the directive to every Tu-154 operator in Iran, and the requirement was later extended worldwide to all aircraft using the Soloviev D-30KU engine.

=== Other deficiencies ===
While not directly contributing to the crash, investigators noted several other deficiencies during the probe. Among them was the crew's decision not to declare an emergency, even though the situation warranted a mayday call. An unauthorized emergency call was eventually made by Flight Engineer Rezve, but it was not received by air traffic control, for reasons the report could not determine. The investigators also noted the silence of the instructor pilot, Captain Akbari, who was supervising the flight; according to the recordings, his voice was never heard during the emergency.

The investigation further noted the absence of a fire-extinguishing system covering the rear compartment. The aircraft's fire suppression was designed to protect the engines, not the structural compartment where the fire occurred, so the crew had no means to fight the blaze, and the design limitation allowed the fire to grow uncontrollably. The report also documented that no signal was received from the aircraft's emergency locator, which would normally activate after a crash; the report flagged this as a matter warranting examination.

=== Conclusion ===
A final accident report was likely released by the Iranian authorities in 2011, although it did not come to wider attention until it was partially translated into English in 2019. The report found that the accident had been caused by fatigue failure of the first stage rotor of the low pressure compressor in engine No. 1, that resulted in the rotor disc disintegrating. Fragments from the rotor disc destroyed engine No. 1, severed the No. 1 and No. 3 hydraulic systems, and partially severed the fuel lines to engine No. 2. Hot components ignited fuel and hydraulic fluids spilling from the damaged fuel lines, and rapidly caused a large fire in the tail section of the plane. The debris also cut the actuator rods that controlled the rudder and elevator, causing the aircraft to lose control.

== Aftermath ==
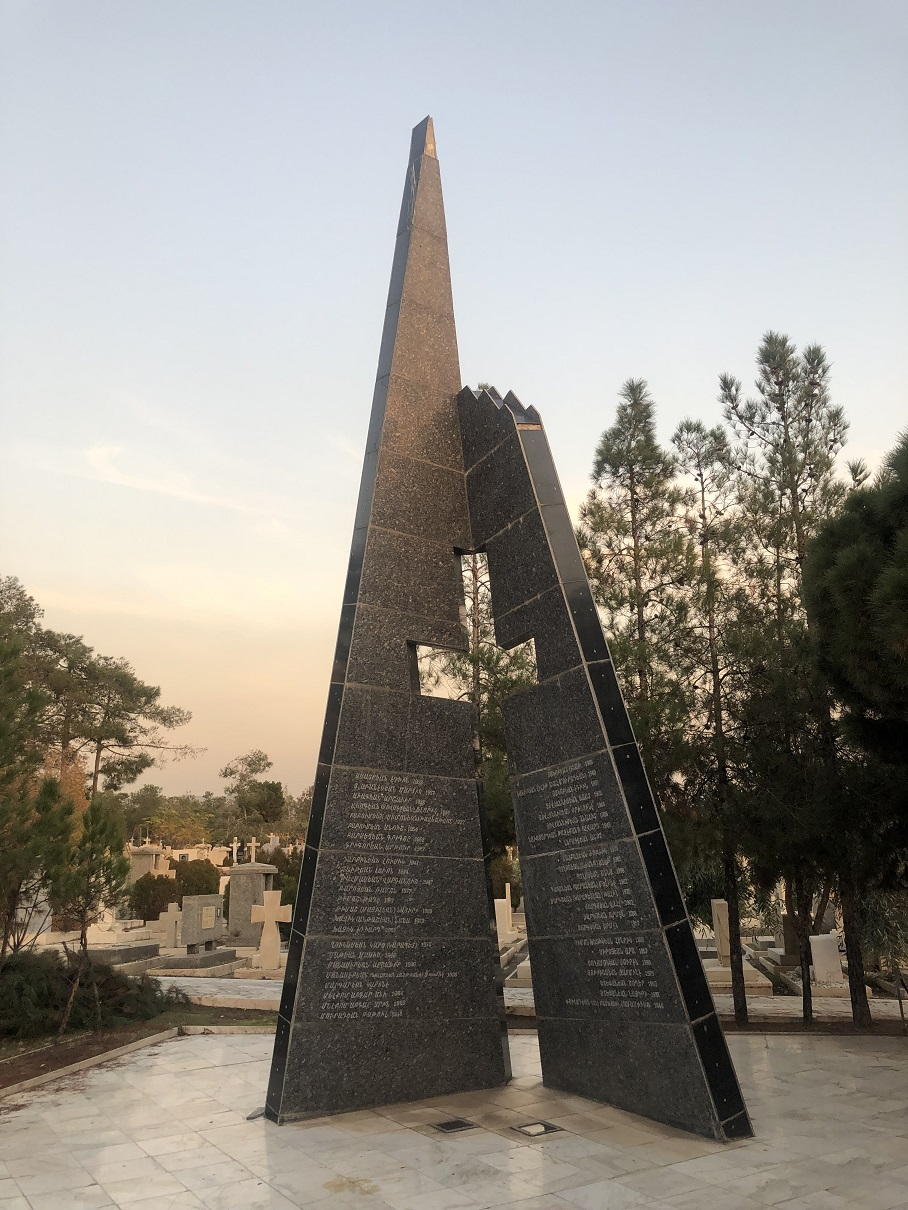
Memorial of victims at Tehran's Nor Burastan Cemetery

Questions about the safety of the Tupolev quickly emerged, especially after it was revealed that the aircraft was more than 20 years old. Iranian officials initially dismissed concerns that the Tupolev Tu-154 was unsafe, even claiming that it was safer than comparable Western aircraft. However, following the crash of Aria Air Flight 1525 a few days later, parliament members began discussing on banning used Russian aircraft from operating in Iran. A month later, Iranian authorities eventually banned second-hand purchased aircraft and leased Russian aircraft. Operators were encouraged to use Western-made planes, and officials stated that Russian-built aircraft would only be accepted if they were brand new and met the country’s required standards.

A further crackdown was conducted by the government. In March 2010, Iranian President Mahmoud Ahmadinejad announced that all Russian pilots in the country would be sent back home within a two-month period and the country's aging Russian fleet would be replaced by newer airplanes without specifying who would be the new supplier. Then transport minister Hamid Behbahani announced that the directive would be effective starting in May, adding that Iran should've employed Iranian pilots more than foreign pilots.

In January 2011, the head of Iran's Civil Aviation Organization, Reza Nakhjavani, stated that the Tupolev Tu-154 would be banned from operating in the country following multiple accidents in the past. All 17 Tupolev Tu-154s would have to be withdrawn from the fleet and their service would have to be stopped by 19 January. The decision was part of a move to modernize the fleet. He also stated that Iranian airliners were given 6 months to employ local crews on their flight. Nakhjavani criticized Tupolev's unwillingness to properly respond to cooperate with Iranian authorities.

In May 2016, Tehran's prosecutor office announced that Tupolev and the personnel servicing the aircraft were to blame for the crash. Ghazi Shahriari from the office stated that the crash had been caused by a faulty compressor valve. He added that a new commission would then be established to investigate on whether there had been any wrongdoings done by Caspian Airlines during the acquirement and operation of the aircraft.

== See also ==
- Baikal Airlines Flight 130
- United Airlines Flight 232
- LOT Polish Airlines Flight 007
