= Fahimeh Rastkar =

Iranian actress and dubbing artist

- فهیمه راستکار
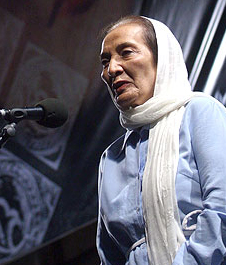
- Rastkar in 2007
- Born: 20 March 1934; Tehran, Iran
- Died: 22 November 2012 (aged 78); Tehran, Iran
- Occupation(s): Actress, voice actress
- Spouse: Najaf Daryabandari
- Children: Sohrab

Fahimeh Rastkar (Persian: فهیمه راستکار) (20 March 1934 – 22 November 2012) was an Iranian actress and dubbing artist.

She died on 22 November 2012 of Alzheimer's disease in Tehran.

== Partial filmography ==
- Moguls, 1973
- The Finishing Line, 1985
- Love and Death, 1989
- Psycho, 1997
- A Girl Called Thunder, 2000.
