= Levon Davidian =

Member of Parliament of Iran
- In office 2000–2004
- Preceded by: Vartan Vartanian
- Succeeded by: Gevorg Vartan
- Constituency: Religious minorities (Tehran Armenians and North of Iran)

Personal details
- Born: 24 March 1944 Hamadan, Imperial State of Iran
- Died: 15 July 2009 (aged 65) near Jannatabad, Qazvin, Iran
- Education: The National University of Iran
- Occupation: Psychiatrist and professor of university

Levon Davidian (Armenian: Լեւոն Դաւթեան; Persian: لئون داویدیان, 24 March 1944 in Hamadan – 15 July 2009), an Iranian-Armenian politician, was an Iranian parliament member. He was a psychiatrist and professor of university. He died when Caspian Airlines Flight 7908 crashed killing all passengers on board.

== Life ==
Davidian first attended school in Tehran and then began studying at the Faculty of Medicine at Shahid Beheshti University there in 1962. In 1978, he received a doctorate in psychiatry. He belonged to the Armenian minority in Iran and represented them in parliament from 2000 to 2004. He was a long-time deputy member of parliament of the Islamic Republic of Iran. He was a prominent figure in his homeland. Davidian was among the 168 people aboard Caspian Airlines Flight 7908 that crashed into a field on July 15, 2009. He died in the crash, leaving behind at least two children, a daughter living in the U.S. and a son in Iran.

== Publications ==
- Handbook of Psychiatry (30 Volumes), volume Four

== See also ==
- Reserved Majlis seats
