= Najaf Daryabandari =

Iranian writer (1929–2020)

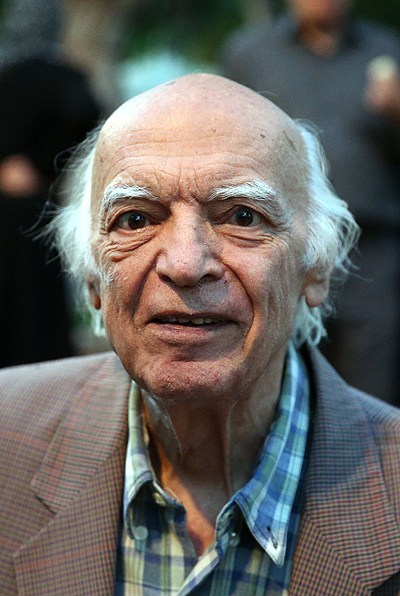
- Born: 23 August 1929; Abadan, Iran
- Died: 4 May 2020 (aged 90); Tehran, Iran
- Occupations: Writer, translator
- Spouses: Zhānit D. Lazāryān (divorced) Fahimeh Rastkar (died 2012)
- Children: 3
- Awards: PEN Literary Award for Translation of Huck Finn

Najaf Daryabandari (Persian: نجف دریابندری; 23 August 1929 – 4 May 2020) was an Iranian writer and translator of works from English into Persian.

== Career ==
Najaf was the son of Captain Khalaf Daryabandari, one of the first marine pilots of Iran. The Iranian Merchant Mariners' Syndicate held a commemoration ceremony for Najaf Daryabandari and awarded him a replica of Darius the Great's Suez Inscriptions. He started translation at the age of 17–18 with the book of William Faulkner, "A Rose for Emily". He and his wife, Fahimeh Rastkar, were also the authors of "The Rt. Honorable Cookbook, from Soup to Nuts" [literally in Persian "From Garlic to Onion"], a two-volume tome on Iranian cuisine that has collected the diverse dishes of the country. He worked as a senior editor at the Tehran branch of Franklin Book Programs.

== Death ==
Najaf Daryabandari died on 4 May 2020, in Tehran at the age of 90 after a long illness.

== Selected list of works ==
Persian Translations

- Hemingway's A Farewell to Arms and The Old Man and the Sea
- Kazuo Ishiguro's Remains of the Day
- William Faulkner's A Rose for Emily and As I Lay Dying (novel)
- Bertrand Russell's A History of Western Philosophy, Mysticism and Logic and Power: A New Social Analysis
- Samuel Beckett's Waiting for Godot
- Edgar Lawrence Doctorow's Billy Bathgate and Ragtime
- Mark Twain's Adventures of Huckleberry Finn and The Mysterious Stranger
- Will Cuppy's The Decline and Fall of Practically Everybody, 1972 under the title of Čenin konand bozorgān (چنین کنند بزرگان, Thus Act the Great).
- Ernst Cassirer's Philosophy of the Enlightenment and The Myth of the State
- Isaiah Berlin's Russian Thinkers
- Sophocles's Antigone
- Kahlil Gibran's The Prophet and The Mad Man

Original works

- The Rt. Honorable Cookbook, from Soup to Nuts, [literally, from garlic to onion, in Persian] co-authored with his wife Fahimeh Rastkar.
- Selflessness pain: Review of the Concept of Alienation in the Philosophy of the West (1990)
- The Myth Legend (2001)
- In This Respect (2009)
