= Clara Abkar =

Iranian-born Armenian female painter (1916–1996)

- کلارا آبکار
- Born: 1916; Tehran, Qajar Iran
- Died: March 20, 1996 (aged 79–80); Iran
- Resting place: Nor Burastan Cemetery
- Other name: Կլարա Աբգար
- Known for: Paisley design
- Notable work: "Pirzan" and "Sultan Sanjar"

Clara Abkar (Persian: کلارا آبکار, Armenian: Կլարա Աբգար; 1916 – March 20, 1996) was an Iranian-Armenian miniaturist painter and gilder. She was the first Iranian female miniaturist. Her name is sometimes spelled Klara Abgar, Clara Abgaryan, and Clara Abkarian.

== Early life and career ==
Clara Abkar was from into an Armenian family from New Julfa the Armenian quarter of Isfahan, Iran. She was born in 1916 in Tehran, Qajar Iran. She studied at the Armenian school Davotian, later called Koshesh. During her school days, she learned painting with Markar Qarabaghian and Hakup Vartanian. She also studied Iranian traditional painting and miniature under Mohammad Mehrovan, the designer of Iranian stamps.

She studied at the High Academy of Fine Arts.

In her miniature paintings horse riding scenes, still lifes, flowers, the Mausoleum of Omar Khayyám, Attar, Sheikh Ahmad, and also the Firozabadi and Aliabad towers had a special place.

She never put her works on sale.

== Works ==
Horse riding scenes, still life paintings, flowers and the tomb of Khayyam and Attar were some of the artist's favorite subjects for miniature paintings. She also excelled in portraying bazam gatherings. Among her famous paintings are Anoushirvan and Bozorgmehr, Shekar-é Bahram, Youssef and Zulikha, The old woman and Ahmad Sanjar, Majlese Sheikh San'Aan, The Fearful Girl, Bazm and Bade Eshgh. Abkar also produced many notable gilded paintings, with her octagonal gilding featuring a paisley design being particularly famous.
