= Baruch Leibov =

18th century Jewish merchant

- Born: Smolensk, Russia
- Died: July 15, 1738; St. Petersburg, Russia
- Occupation: Merchant
- Criminal charges: Proselytizing
- Penalty: Burnt to death at the stake

Baruch Leibov was a Jewish merchant who was burnt to death at the stake in St. Petersburg, Russia on July 15, 1738, for proselytizing.

== Biography ==
Leibov, a Jew of Smolensk, had developed a network of contacts amongst Russian nobility which allowed him unusual privileges and influence. This would come to a head in 1722 when the merchants of Smolensk brought charges against the local vice governor, Prince Vasili Gagarin, to the Holy Synod. They accused Gagarin of allowing Jews to engage in numerous business pursuits and that Leibov had used land he had leased to erect a synagogue in the village of Sverovich. The court would rule that the synagogue should be destroyed, but that Leibov could remain, this was until the case was reopened.

In 1727, under the reign of Tsar Catherine I, the case was reopened and Leibov, who was serving as a tax collector, along with other Jews were expelled from Russia to Poland. Despite the expulsion he would continue to travel into Russia for business, working as a merchant.

During this time Leibov would come into contact with a retired Russian Naval officer Alexander Voznitsyn in Moscow. Leibov would teach Voznitsyn Hebrew and eventually take him to the Polish border, at Dubrowna, where the officer converted to Judaism and received a circumcision in Leibov's son's home.

Accused by Voznitsyn's wife of the illegal conversion, coupled with the previous charge of building a synagogue, Leibov and Voznitsyn were arrested. They were investigated, tortured, and eventually burnt at the stake in St. Petersburg on July 15, 1738. This execution would be the start of numerous repressive measures brought forth against the Jews under Anna Ivanovna in 1739.
