= Jannatabad, Qazvin =

Jannatabad جنت‌آباد
- Village
- Location within Iran
- Coordinates: 36°10′24″N 49°53′50″E
- Country: Iran
- Province: Qazvin
- County: Qazvin
- Bakhsh: Central
- Rural District: Eqbal-e Gharbi

Population (2006)
  - Total: 259
- Time zone: UTC+3:30 (IRST)
  - Summer (DST): UTC+4:30 (IRDT)

Jannatabad (Persian: جنت‌آباد, also Romanized as Jannatābād; also known as Kasimabad, Qāsemābād, and Qāsimābād) is a village in Eqbal-e Gharbi Rural District, in the Central District of Qazvin County, Qazvin Province, Iran. At the 2006 census, its population was 259, in 72 families.

In 2009, Caspian Airlines Flight 7908 crashed near this village.
