= Arabshah =

Arabshah (Persian: عربشاه) may refer to:

- Arabshah-e Daraq, East Azerbaijan Province
- Arabshah-e Khargushan, East Azerbaijan Province
- Arabshah Khan, East Azerbaijan Province
- Arabshah, Isfahan
- Arabshah, Takab, West Azerbaijan Province
- Arabshah, Takht-e Soleyman, Takab County, West Azerbaijan Province

== See also ==
- Arabshahids, a dynasty of the Khanate of Khiva
