= Qerkhlu =

Qerkhlu or Qerekhlu or Qerrekhlu (Persian: قرخلو) may refer to:

- Qerrekhlu, Fars
- Qerekhlu, Isfahan
- Qerkhlu, Takab, West Azerbaijan Province
- Qerekhlu, Urmia, West Azerbaijan Province
