= Hajji Baba =

Hajji Baba may refer to:

- Books by James Justinian Morier
- Hajji Baba-ye Olya, a village in West Azerbaijan Province, Iran
- Hajji Baba-ye Sofla, a village in West Azerbaijan Province, Iran
- Hajji Baba-ye Vosta, a village in West Azerbaijan Province, Iran
