= Hajji Babay =

Hajji Babay (Persian: حاجي باباي) may refer to:

- Hajji Babay-e Olya
- Hajji Babay-e Sofla
- Hajji Babay-e Vosta
