= Sarijalu =

Sarijalu or Sari Jaloo or Sari Jallu (Persian: ساريجالو) may refer to:

- Sarijalu, East Azerbaijan
- Sarijalu, Takab, West Azerbaijan Province
- Sarijalu, Urmia, West Azerbaijan Province
- Sarijalu, Zanjan
