= Meqas =

Meqas (Persian: مقاس), also rendered as Meqyas, may refer to:

- Meqas-e Jadid, East Azerbaijan Province
- Meqas-e Qadim, East Azerbaijan Province
- Meqas, Razavi Khorasan
