= Dulan =

Dulan may refer to:

- Dulan Khan or Tulan Qaghan, a khan of the Göktürk empire from 588 to 599
- Dulan County, in Qinghai Province, China
- Dulan, Iran, a village in East Azerbaijan Province, Iran
- Dulan (Vranje), a village in Serbia
- Dulan (都蘭), Taiwan, a village in Taitiung County, Taiwan
- Tulane University (杜兰), a private university in New Orleans, Louisiana, United States
