= Pireh Yusefian =

Pireh Yusefian (Persian: پيره يوسفيان) may refer to:

- Pireh Yusefian-e Olya
- Pireh Yusefian-e Sofla
