= Chay Kandi =

Chay Kandi or Chaykendi (Persian: چاي كندي) may refer to:

- Chay Kandi, Heris
- Chay Kandi, Kaleybar
- Chay Kandi, Khoda Afarin
- Chay Kandi, Varzaqan
