= Tappeh Bur =

Tappeh Bur (Persian: تپه بور) may refer to:

- Tappeh Bur, Kermanshah
- Tappeh Bur, West Azerbaijan
