= Nokhowd Darreh =

Nokhowd Darreh نخوددره
- Village
- Location within Iran
- Coordinates: 36°21′05″N 46°54′28″E
- Country: Iran
- Province: West Azerbaijan
- County: Takab
- Bakhsh: Central
- Rural District: Karaftu

Population (2006)
  - Total: 103
- Time zone: UTC+3:30 (IRST)
  - Summer (DST): UTC+4:30 (IRDT)

Nokhowd Darreh (Persian: نخوددره) is a village in Karaftu Rural District, in the Central District of Takab County, West Azerbaijan Province, Iran. At the 2006 census, its population was 103, in 19 families.
