= Tas Kand =

Tas Kand طاس كند
- Village
- Location within Iran
- Coordinates: 36°25′13″N 46°56′17″E
- Country: Iran
- Province: West Azerbaijan
- County: Takab
- Bakhsh: Central
- Rural District: Karaftu

Population (2006)
  - Total: 181
- Time zone: UTC+3:30 (IRST)
  - Summer (DST): UTC+4:30 (IRDT)

Tas Kand (Persian: طاس كند, also Romanized as Ţās Kand, Ţāskand, and Tās Kand) is a village in Karaftu Rural District, in the Central District of Takab County, West Azerbaijan Province, Iran. At the 2006 census, its population was 181, in 31 families.
