= Badmahmud =

Village in West Azerbaijan province, Iran

Badmahmud Persian: بادمحمود
- Village
- Location within Iran
- Coordinates: 36°25′00″N 47°05′19″E
- Country: Iran
- Province: West Azerbaijan
- County: Takab
- District: Central
- Rural District: Afshar

Population (2016)
  - Total: 61
- Time zone: UTC+3:30 (IRST)

Badmahmud (Persian: بادمحمود) (Note: Also romanized as Bādmaḩmūd) is a village in Afshar Rural District of the Central District in Takab County, West Azerbaijan province, Iran.

== Demographics ==
=== Population ===
At the time of the 2006 National Census, the village's population was 133 in 30 households, when it was in Karaftu Rural District. The following census in 2011 counted 83 people in 23 households, by which time the village had been transferred to Afshar Rural District. The 2016 census measured the population of the village as 61 people in 16 households.
