= Tanderlu =

Tanderlu or Tondarlu (Persian: تندرلو) may refer to:

- Tanderlu, East Azerbaijan
- Tondarlu, West Azerbaijan
