= Aqa Beyk =

Aqa Beyk اقابيك
- Village
- Location within Iran
- Coordinates: 36°23′49″N 46°54′45″E
- Country: Iran
- Province: West Azerbaijan
- County: Takab
- Bakhsh: Central
- Rural District: Karaftu

Population (2006)
  - Total: 139
- Time zone: UTC+3:30 (IRST)
  - Summer (DST): UTC+4:30 (IRDT)

Aqa Beyk (Persian: اقابيك, also Romanized as Āqā Beyk; also known as Āqā Beyg) is a village in Karaftu Rural District, in the Central District of Takab County, West Azerbaijan Province, Iran. At the 2006 census, its population was 139, in 27 families.
