= Qoldarreh =

Qoldarreh (Persian: قلدره), also rendered as Qowldarreh, may refer to:

- Qoldarreh-ye Olya
- Qoldarreh-ye Sofla
