= Boluz =

Village in West Azerbaijan province, Iran

Boluz Persian: بلوز
- Village
- Location within Iran
- Coordinates: 36°26′29″N 46°50′56″E
- Country: Iran
- Province: West Azerbaijan
- County: Takab
- District: Central
- Rural District: Karaftu

Population (2016)
  - Total: 323
- Time zone: UTC+3:30 (IRST)

Boluz (Persian: بلوز) (Note: Also romanized as Bolūz) is a village in Karaftu Rural District of the Central District in Takab County, West Azerbaijan province, Iran.

== Demographics ==
=== Population ===
At the time of the 2006 National Census, the village's population was 160 in 30 households. The following census in 2011 counted 144 people in 37 households. The 2016 census measured the population of the village as 151 people in 39 households.
