= Sabil, Iran =

Village in West Azerbaijan province, Iran

Sabil Persian: سبيل
- Village
- Location within Iran
- Coordinates: 36°18′08″N 47°12′39″E
- Country: Iran
- Province: West Azerbaijan
- County: Takab
- District: Central
- Rural District: Ansar

Population (2016)
  - Total: 550
- Time zone: UTC+3:30 (IRST)

Sabil (Persian: سبيل) (Note: Also romanized as Sabīl) is a village in Ansar Rural District of the Central District in Takab County, West Azerbaijan province, Iran.

== Demographics ==
=== Population ===
At the time of the 2006 National Census, the village's population was 872 in 171 households. The following census in 2011 counted 726 people in 204 households. The 2016 census measured the population of the village as 550 people in 161 households.
