= Tamay =

Village in West Azerbaijan province, Iran

Tamay Persian: تماي
- Village
- Location within Iran
- Coordinates: 36°21′58″N 47°11′56″E
- Country: Iran
- Province: West Azerbaijan
- County: Takab
- District: Central
- Rural District: Ansar

Population (2016)
  - Total: 408
- Time zone: UTC+3:30 (IRST)

Tamay (Persian: تماي) (Note: Also romanized as Tamāy; also known as Tamāk) is a village in Ansar Rural District of the Central District in Takab County, West Azerbaijan province, Iran.

== Demographics ==
=== Population ===
At the time of the 2006 National Census, the village's population was 580 in 112 households. The following census in 2011 counted 521 people in 131 households. The 2016 census measured the population of the village as 408 people in 122 households.
