= Yaharlu =

Village in West Azerbaijan province, Iran

Yaharlu Persian: يهرلو
- Village
- Location within Iran
- Coordinates: 36°26′48″N 47°00′39″E
- Country: Iran
- Province: West Azerbaijan
- County: Takab
- District: Central
- Rural District: Karaftu

Population (2016)
  - Total: 145
- Time zone: UTC+3:30 (IRST)

Yaharlu (Persian: يهرلو) (Note: Also romanized as Yaharlū; also known as Yaharlī) is a village in Karaftu Rural District of the Central District in Takab County, West Azerbaijan province, Iran.

== Demographics ==
=== Population ===
At the time of the 2006 National Census, the village's population was 253 in 53 households. The following census in 2011 counted 175 people in 35 households. The 2016 census measured the population of the village as 145 people in 44 households.
