= Sintung Sugar Factory Culture Park =

Former factory in Donghe, Taitung County, Taiwan

- 新東糖廠文化園區
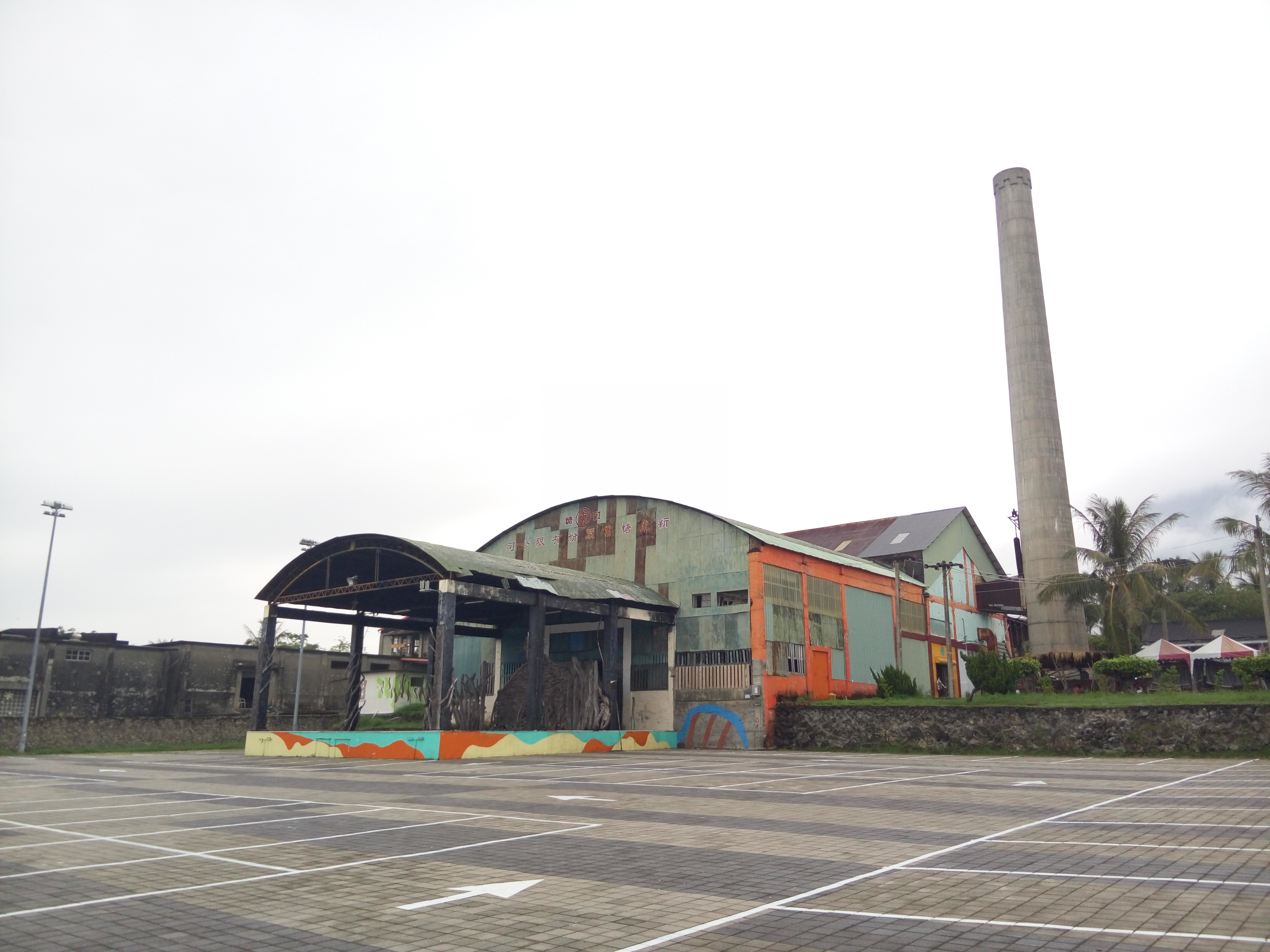

- Taiwan
- Location: Donghe, Taitung County, Taiwan
- Coordinates: 22°52′20.4″N 121°13′33.0″E
- Type: former sugar refinery

The Sintung Sugar Factory Culture Park (traditional Chinese: 新東糖廠文化園區; simplified Chinese: 新东糖厂文化园区; pinyin: Xīndōng Táng Chǎng Wénhuà Yuánqū) is a former sugar refinery which has been turned into a multi-purpose park located in Dulan Village, Donghe Township, Taitung County, Taiwan.

== History ==
The culture park used to be a private sugar refinery operating in the region which was built during the Japanese rule of Taiwan. During the World War II, the refinery was bombed. After it had ceased to operation in 1991, a group of art workers moved in and revived the building with the help of Taitung County Government. It was then transformed into showrooms and studios.

== Architecture ==
The culture park consists of bed and breakfast, handicraft shop, coffee house etc. It is mostly made of pebbles, steel bars and driftwood.

== Events ==
The culture park regularly holds various events such as live concerts and dances.

== See also ==
- List of tourist attractions in Taiwan
