= Feyzabad, Takab =

Village in West Azerbaijan province, Iran

Feyzabad Persian: فيض اباد
- Village
- Location within Iran
- Coordinates: 36°28′03″N 47°05′43″E
- Country: Iran
- Province: West Azerbaijan
- County: Takab
- District: Central
- Rural District: Afshar

Population (2016)
  - Total: 136
- Time zone: UTC+3:30 (IRST)

Feyzabad (Persian: فيض اباد) (Note: Also romanized as Feyẕābād) is a village in Afshar Rural District of the Central District in Takab County, West Azerbaijan province, Iran.

== Demographics ==
=== Population ===
At the time of the 2006 National Census, the village's population was 232 in 49 households. The following census in 2011 counted 207 people in 58 households. The 2016 census measured the population of the village as 136 people in 43 households.
