= Chahar Taq, West Azerbaijan =

Village in West Azerbaijan province, Iran

Chahar Taq Persian: چهارطاق
- Village
- Location within Iran
- Coordinates: 36°28′11″N 47°18′41″E
- Country: Iran
- Province: West Azerbaijan
- County: Takab
- District: Central
- Rural District: Afshar

Population (2016)
  - Total: 433
- Time zone: UTC+3:30 (IRST)

Chahar Taq (Persian: چهارطاق) (Note: Also romanized as Chahār Ţāq) is a village in Afshar Rural District of the Central District in Takab County, West Azerbaijan province, Iran.

== Demographics ==
=== Population ===
At the time of the 2006 National Census, the village's population was 504 in 98 households. The following census in 2011 counted 435 people in 101 households. The 2016 census measured the population of the village as 433 people in 134 households.
