= Tondarlu, West Azerbaijan =

Tondarlu تندرلو
- Village
- Location within Iran
- Coordinates: 36°24′37″N 46°51′53″E
- Country: Iran
- Province: West Azerbaijan
- County: Takab
- Bakhsh: Central
- Rural District: Karaftu

Population (2006)
  - Total: 58
- Time zone: UTC+3:30 (IRST)
  - Summer (DST): UTC+4:30 (IRDT)

Tondarlu (Persian: تندرلو, also Romanized as Tondarlū) is a village in Karaftu Rural District, in the Central District of Takab County, West Azerbaijan Province, Iran. At the 2006 census, its population was 58, in 11 families.
