= Dur Bash =

Village in West Azerbaijan province, Iran

Dur Bash Persian: دورباش
- Village
- Location within Iran
- Coordinates: 36°19′50″N 47°13′46″E
- Country: Iran
- Province: West Azerbaijan
- County: Takab
- District: Central
- Rural District: Ansar

Population (2016)
  - Total: 729
- Time zone: UTC+3:30 (IRST)

Dur Bash (Persian: دورباش) (Note: Also romanized as Dūr-Bāsh) is a village in, and the capital of, Ansar Rural District in the Central District of Takab County, West Azerbaijan province, Iran.

== Demographics ==
=== Population ===
At the time of the 2006 National Census, the village's population was 1,067 in 231 households. The following census in 2011 counted 895 people in 251 households. The 2016 census measured the population of the village as 729 people in 219 households. It was the most populous village in its rural district.
