= Qarah Qayah, Takab =

Village in West Azerbaijan province, Iran

Qarah Qayah Persian: قره قيه
- Village
- Location within Iran
- Coordinates: 36°30′06″N 47°05′54″E
- Country: Iran
- Province: West Azerbaijan
- County: Takab
- District: Central
- Rural District: Afshar

Population (2016)
  - Total: 490
- Time zone: UTC+3:30 (IRST)

Qarah Qayah (Persian: قره قيه) (Note: Also known as Qarāqīah) is a village in Afshar Rural District of the Central District in Takab County, West Azerbaijan province, Iran.

== Demographics ==
=== Population ===
At the time of the 2006 National Census, the village's population was 494 in 83 households. The following census in 2011 counted 511 people in 126 households. The 2016 census measured the population of the village as 490 people in 131 households.
