= Gaz Darreh =

Village in West Azerbaijan province, Iran

Gaz Darreh Persian: گزدره
- Village
- Location within Iran
- Coordinates: 36°18′02″N 47°07′41″E
- Country: Iran
- Province: West Azerbaijan
- County: Takab
- District: Central
- Rural District: Ansar

Population (2016)
  - Total: 534
- Time zone: UTC+3:30 (IRST)

Gaz Darreh (Persian: گزدره) is a village in Ansar Rural District of the Central District in Takab County, West Azerbaijan province, Iran.

== Demographics ==
=== Population ===
At the time of the 2006 National Census, the village's population was 590 in 108 households. The following census in 2011 counted 565 people in 131 households. The 2016 census measured the population of the village as 534 people in 156 households.
