= Khaneh-ye Khosrow =

Khaneh-ye Khosrow خانه خسرو
- Village
- Location within Iran
- Coordinates: 38°53′00″N 47°02′00″E
- Country: Iran
- Province: East Azerbaijan
- County: Kaleybar
- Bakhsh: Central
- Rural District: Yeylaq

Population (2006)
  - Total: 99
- Time zone: UTC+3:30 (IRST)
  - Summer (DST): UTC+4:30 (IRDT)

Khaneh-ye Khosrow (Persian: خانه خسرو, also Romanized as Khāneh-ye Khosrow) is a village in Yeylaq Rural District, in the Central District of Kaleybar County, East Azerbaijan Province, Iran. At the 2006 census, its population was 99, in 23 families.
