= Sari Bagh =

Village in West Azerbaijan province, Iran

Sari Bagh Persian: ساري باغ
- Village
- Location within Iran
- Coordinates: 36°25′58″N 46°54′35″E
- Country: Iran
- Province: West Azerbaijan
- County: Takab
- District: Central
- Rural District: Karaftu

Population (2016)
  - Total: 120
- Time zone: UTC+3:30 (IRST)

Sari Bagh (Persian: ساري باغ) (Note: Also romanized as Sārī Bāgh; also known as Sārī Bākh) is a village in Karaftu Rural District of the Central District in Takab County, West Azerbaijan province, Iran.

== Demographics ==
=== Population ===
At the time of the 2006 National Census, the village's population was 150 in 30 households. The following census in 2011 counted 143 people in 29 households. The 2016 census measured the population of the village as 120 people in 32 households.
