= Asman Bolaghi =

Village in West Azerbaijan province, Iran

Asman Bolaghi Persian: اسمان بلاغي
- Village
- Location within Iran
- Coordinates: 36°16′22″N 47°19′32″E
- Country: Iran
- Province: West Azerbaijan
- County: Takab
- District: Central
- Rural District: Ansar

Population (2016)
  - Total: 107
- Time zone: UTC+3:30 (IRST)

Asman Bolaghi (Persian: اسمان بلاغي) (Note: Also romanized as Āsmān Bolāghī) is a village in Ansar Rural District of the Central District in Takab County, West Azerbaijan province, Iran.

== Demographics ==
=== Population ===
At the time of the 2006 National Census, the village's population was 127 in 25 households. The following census in 2011 counted 127 people in 32 households. The 2016 census measured the population of the village as 107 people in 31 households.
