= Chap Darreh =

Chap Darreh (Persian: چپ دره) may refer to:

- Chap Darreh, West Azerbaijan
- Chap Darreh, Zanjan
