= Yolqun Aghaj =

Village in West Azerbaijan province, Iran

Yolqun Aghaj Persian: يلقون اغاج
- Village
- Location within Iran
- Coordinates: 36°24′38″N 47°11′45″E
- Country: Iran
- Province: West Azerbaijan
- County: Takab
- District: Central
- Rural District: Afshar

Population (2016)
  - Total: 661
- Time zone: UTC+3:30 (IRST)

Yolqun Aghaj (Persian: يلقون اغاج) (Note: Also romanized as Yolqūn Āghāj; also known as Yolgūn Āghāj and Yūlqūn Āghāch) is a village in Afshar Rural District of the Central District in Takab County, West Azerbaijan province, Iran.

== Demographics ==
=== Population ===
At the time of the 2006 National Census, the village's population was 899 in 192 households. The following census in 2011 counted 771 people in 223 households. The 2016 census measured the population of the village as 661 people in 213 households.
