= Sarcophagus (megalith) =

Type of megalithic monument

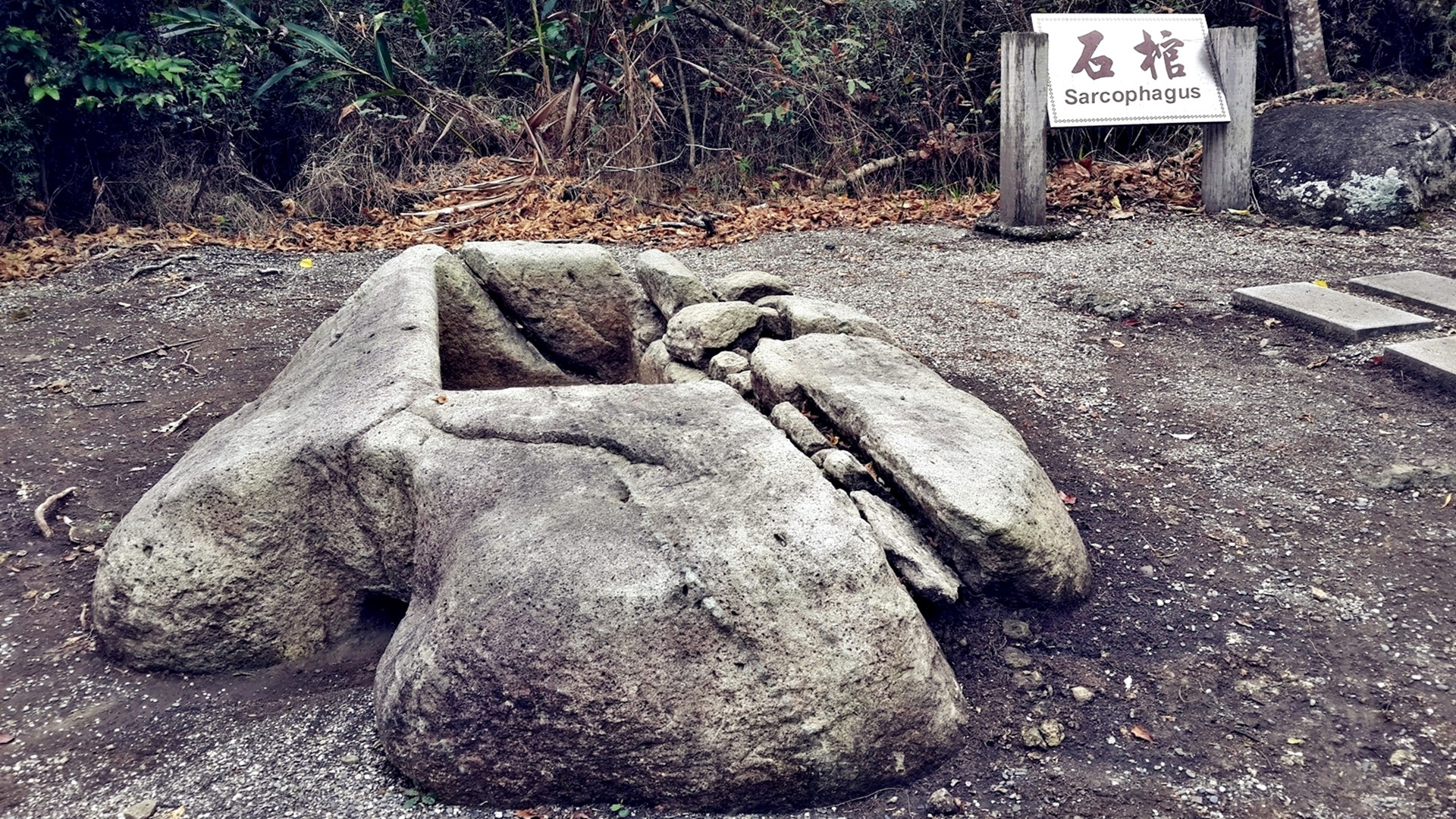
Sarcophagus in Tulan site, Taitung, Taiwan

In the archaeology of Taiwan, a sarcophagus is a megalithic monument that is carved with a rectangular groove. They are distributed around eastern Taiwan and are significant relics of the megalith culture.

They can be divided into movable and unmovable ones. Movable sarcophagus are carved with a giant bulk of stone, while the unmovable ones are directly carved on the laccolith. Square- or strip-like bulges can be seen on the outside of some movable sarcophagus. The grooves of most sarcophagus have holes penetrating to the outer side of the bulk. Currently, sarcophagus have been unearthed in Hsinshe Site, Kung Hsia Site, Fengpin Site, and Taipalang Site in Hualien County, as well as Chankuang Site, Chilunshan Site, Chiatsouwan Site, Paishoulien Site, Chilin Site, Papien Site, Heping Site, and Tulan Site in Taitung County

Although they are often called “stone coffin” in their Chinese name, the sarcophagus are called so simply because of an intuitive observation on their shape. In reality, their function is not yet confirmed. No skeletons or other objects related to the funeral have been found. Aside from coffins, based on the holes in the grooves, they might also serve as tanks for water storage, with the holes discharging the water. Still, most people think that they have something to do with rituals or ceremonies. Recently, it is also discovered that the Amis (Pangcah) people living in eastern Taiwan have been re-using the sarcophagus by fragmenting it to pray for the rain.

== Additional source ==
走讀臺灣✕走讀史前：追隨風暴之子的履跡 READ TAIWAN✕READ PREHISTORY: Follow the Footsteps of Vali on YouTube
