= Qujeh =

Village in West Azerbaijan province, Iran

Qujeh Persian: قوجه
- Village
- Location within Iran
- Coordinates: 36°24′28″N 46°59′17″E
- Country: Iran
- Province: West Azerbaijan
- County: Takab
- District: Central
- Rural District: Karaftu

Population (2016)
  - Total: 542
- Time zone: UTC+3:30 (IRST)

Qujeh (Persian: قوجه) (Note: Also romanized as Qūjeh) is a village in, and the capital of, Karaftu Rural District in the Central District of Takab County, West Azerbaijan province, Iran.

== Demographics ==
=== Population ===
At the time of the 2006 National Census, the village's population was 646 in 128 households. The following census in 2011 counted 598 people in 132 households. The 2016 census measured the population of the village as 542 people in 162 households.
