= Aq Qaleh, West Azerbaijan =

Village in West Azerbaijan province, Iran

Aq Qaleh Persian: اق قلعه
- Village
- Location within Iran
- Coordinates: 36°19′29″N 47°07′13″E
- Country: Iran
- Province: West Azerbaijan
- County: Takab
- District: Central
- Rural District: Ansar

Population (2016)
  - Total: 220
- Time zone: UTC+3:30 (IRST)

Aq Qaleh (Persian: اق قلعه) (Note: Also romanized as Āq Qal‘eh and Āqqal‘eh) is a village in Ansar Rural District of the Central District in Takab County, West Azerbaijan province, Iran.

== Demographics ==
=== Population ===
At the time of the 2006 National Census, the village's population was 264 in 46 households. The following census in 2011 counted 242 people in 63 households. The 2016 census measured the population of the village as 220 people in 68 households.
