= Kutan-e Olya =

Village in West Azerbaijan province, Iran

Kutan-e Olya Persian: كوتان عليا
- Village
- Location within Iran
- Coordinates: 36°15′23″N 47°10′43″E
- Country: Iran
- Province: West Azerbaijan
- County: Takab
- District: Central
- Rural District: Ansar

Population (2016)
  - Total: 306
- Time zone: UTC+3:30 (IRST)

Kutan-e Olya (Persian: كوتان عليا) (Note: Also romanized as Kūtān-e ‘Olyā) is a village in Ansar Rural District of the Central District in Takab County, West Azerbaijan province, Iran.

== Demographics ==
=== Population ===
At the time of the 2006 National Census, the village's population was 441 in 70 households. The following census in 2011 counted 345 people in 84 households. The 2016 census measured the population of the village as 306 people in 89 households.
