= Dash Bolagh, West Azerbaijan =

Village in West Azerbaijan province, Iran

Dash Bolagh Persian: داشبلاغ
- Village
- Location within Iran
- Coordinates: 36°24′14″N 47°01′03″E
- Country: Iran
- Province: West Azerbaijan
- County: Takab
- District: Central
- Rural District: Karaftu

Population (2016)
  - Total: 243
- Time zone: UTC+3:30 (IRST)

Dash Bolagh (Persian: داشبلاغ) (Note: Also romanized as Dāsh Bolāgh) is a village in Karaftu Rural District of the Central District in Takab County, West Azerbaijan province, Iran.

== Demographics ==
=== Population ===
At the time of the 2006 National Census, the village's population was 415 in 83 households. The following census in 2011 counted 302 people in 69 households. The 2016 census measured the population of the village as 243 people in 70 households.
