= Darvish Rash =

Village in West Azerbaijan province, Iran

Darvish Rash Persian: درويش رش
- Village
- Location within Iran
- Coordinates: 36°23′41″N 46°53′18″E
- Country: Iran
- Province: West Azerbaijan
- County: Takab
- District: Central
- Rural District: Karaftu

Population (2016)
  - Total: 146
- Time zone: UTC+3:30 (IRST)

Darvish Rash (Persian: درويش رش) (Note: Also romanized as Darvīsh Rash; also known as Darvīsheh Rash) is a village in Karaftu Rural District of the Central District in Takab County, West Azerbaijan province, Iran.

== Demographics ==
=== Population ===
At the time of the 2006 National Census, the village's population was 179 in 30 households. The following census in 2011 counted 146 people in 36 households. The 2016 census measured the population of the village as 146 people in 35 households.
