= Qaleh Juq, Takab =

Village in West Azerbaijan province, Iran

Qaleh Juq Persian: قلعه جوق
- Village
- Location within Iran
- Coordinates: 36°26′21″N 47°12′13″E
- Country: Iran
- Province: West Azerbaijan
- County: Takab
- District: Central
- Rural District: Afshar

Population (2016)
  - Total: 166
- Time zone: UTC+3:30 (IRST)

Qaleh Juq (Persian: قلعه جوق) (Note: Also romanized as Qal‘eh Jūq) is a village in Afshar Rural District of the Central District in Takab County, West Azerbaijan province, Iran.

== Demographics ==
=== Population ===
At the time of the 2006 National Census, the village's population was 267 in 46 households. The following census in 2011 counted 175 people in 48 households. The 2016 census measured the population of the village as 166 people in 51 households.
