= Badkharid =

Village in West Azerbaijan province, Iran

Badkharid Persian: بادخريد
- Village
- Location within Iran
- Coordinates: 36°27′09″N 47°06′10″E
- Country: Iran
- Province: West Azerbaijan
- County: Takab
- District: Central
- Rural District: Afshar

Population (2016)
  - Total: 43
- Time zone: UTC+3:30 (IRST)

Badkharid (Persian: بادخريد) (Note: Also romanized as Bādkharīd; also known as Vīkher) is a village in Afshar Rural District of the Central District in Takab County, West Azerbaijan province, Iran.

== Demographics ==
=== Population ===
At the time of the 2006 National Census, the village's population was 67 in 15 households. The following census in 2011 counted 47 people in 14 households. The 2016 census measured the population of the village as 43 people in 13 households.
