= Qojur, West Azerbaijan =

Village in West Azerbaijan province, Iran

Qojur Persian: قجور
- Village
- Location within Iran
- Coordinates: 36°24′21″N 47°08′58″E
- Country: Iran
- Province: West Azerbaijan
- County: Takab
- District: Central
- Rural District: Afshar

Population (2016)
  - Total: 161
- Time zone: UTC+3:30 (IRST)

Qojur (Persian: قجور) (Note: Also romanized as Qojūr) is a village in Afshar Rural District of the Central District in Takab County, West Azerbaijan province, Iran.

== Demographics ==
=== Population ===
At the time of the 2006 National Census, the village's population was 277 in 55 households. The following census in 2011 counted 225 people in 58 households. The 2016 census measured the population of the village as 161 people in 50 households.
