= Sari Qurkhan =

Village in West Azerbaijan province, Iran

Sari Qurkhan Persian: ساري قورخان
- Village
- Location within Iran
- Coordinates: 36°25′00″N 46°54′32″E
- Country: Iran
- Province: West Azerbaijan
- County: Takab
- District: Central
- Rural District: Karaftu

Population (2016)
  - Total: 103
- Time zone: UTC+3:30 (IRST)

Sari Qurkhan (Persian: ساري قورخان) (Note: Also romanized as Sārī Qūrkhān) is a village in Karaftu Rural District of the Central District in Takab County, West Azerbaijan province, Iran.

== Demographics ==
=== Population ===
At the time of the 2006 National Census, the village's population was 151 in 30 households. The following census in 2011 counted 127 people in 34 households. The 2016 census measured the population of the village as 103 people in 32 households.
