= Ayqalehsi =

Village in West Azerbaijan province, Iran

Ayqalehsi Persian: اي قلعه سي
- Village
- Location within Iran
- Coordinates: 36°19′33″N 47°22′26″E
- Country: Iran
- Province: West Azerbaijan
- County: Takab
- District: Central
- Rural District: Ansar

Population (2016)
  - Total: 148
- Time zone: UTC+3:30 (IRST)

Ayqalehsi (Persian: اي قلعه سي) (Note: Also romanized as Āyqal‘ehsī) is a village in Ansar Rural District of the Central District in Takab County, West Azerbaijan province, Iran.

== Demographics ==
=== Population ===
At the time of the 2006 National Census, the village's population was 184 in 30 households. The following census in 2011 counted 152 people in 37 households. The 2016 census measured the population of the village as 148 people in 38 households.
