= Tasheh Kabud =

Village in West Azerbaijan province, Iran

Tasheh Kabud Persian: تاشه كبود
- Village
- Location within Iran
- Coordinates: 36°19′04″N 47°04′17″E
- Country: Iran
- Province: West Azerbaijan
- County: Takab
- District: Central
- Rural District: Ansar

Population (2016)
  - Total: 106
- Time zone: UTC+3:30 (IRST)

Tasheh Kabud (Persian: تاشه كبود) (Note: Also romanized as Ţāsheh Kabūd; also known as Tāshkabūd) is a village in Ansar Rural District of the Central District in Takab County, West Azerbaijan province, Iran.

== Demographics ==
=== Population ===
At the time of the 2006 National Census, the village's population was 183 in 36 households. The following census in 2011 counted 129 people in 37 households. The 2016 census measured the population of the village as 106 people in 31 households.
