= Govar =

Govar or Gavar (Persian: گوار) may refer to:

- Gavar, Kaleybar, East Azerbaijan Province
- Gavar, Tabriz, East Azerbaijan Province
- Gavar, Kerman
- Gavar, Markazi
- Govar District, in Kermanshah Province
