= Aliabad-e Nokhowd Darreh =

Village in West Azerbaijan province, Iran

Aliabad-e Nokhowd Darreh Persian: علي ابادنخوددره
- Village
- Location within Iran
- Coordinates: 36°20′46″N 46°54′37″E
- Country: Iran
- Province: West Azerbaijan
- County: Takab
- District: Central
- Rural District: Karaftu

Population (2016)
  - Total: 112
- Time zone: UTC+3:30 (IRST)

Aliabad-e Nokhowd Darreh (Persian: علي ابادنخوددره) (Note: Also romanized as‘Alīābād-e Nokhowd Darreh; also known as ‘Alīābād) is a village in Karaftu Rural District of the Central District in Takab County, West Azerbaijan province, Iran.

== Demographics ==
=== Population ===
At the time of the 2006 National Census, the village's population was 182 in 31 households. The following census in 2011 counted 178 people in 34 households. The 2016 census measured the population of the village as 112 people in 33 households.
