= Badarlu =

Village in West Azerbaijan province, Iran

Badarlu Persian: بدرلو
- Village
- Location within Iran
- Coordinates: 36°28′17″N 47°13′54″E
- Country: Iran
- Province: West Azerbaijan
- County: Takab
- District: Central
- Rural District: Afshar

Population (2016)
  - Total: 105
- Time zone: UTC+3:30 (IRST)

Badarlu (Persian: بدرلو) (Note: Also romanized as Badarlū) is a village in Afshar Rural District of the Central District in Takab County, West Azerbaijan province, Iran.

== Demographics ==
=== Population ===
At the time of the 2006 National Census, the village's population was 146 in 30 households. The following census in 2011 counted 126 people in 31 households. The 2016 census measured the population of the village as 105 people in 32 households.
