= Owghul Beyg =

Village in West Azerbaijan province, Iran

Owghul Beyg Persian: اوغول بيگ
- Village
- Location within Iran
- Coordinates: 36°26′55″N 47°08′03″E
- Country: Iran
- Province: West Azerbaijan
- County: Takab
- District: Central
- Rural District: Afshar

Population (2016)
  - Total: 930
- Time zone: UTC+3:30 (IRST)

Owghul Beyg (Persian: اوغول بيگ) (Note: Also romanized as Ughul Beyg and Ūghūl Beyg; also known as Oghūl Beyg and Oghūl Beyk) is a village in, and the capital of, Afshar Rural District in the Central District of Takab County, West Azerbaijan province, Iran.

== Demographics ==
=== Population ===
At the time of the 2006 National Census, the village's population was 1,236 in 320 households. The following census in 2011 counted 1,095 people in 318 households. The 2016 census measured the population of the village as 930 people in 309 households. It was the most populous village in its rural district.
