= Yanping Township =

Mountain indigenous township in Taitung County, Taiwan

Coordinates: 22°40′26″N 120°39′47″E

Yanping Township 延平鄉
- Mountain indigenous township
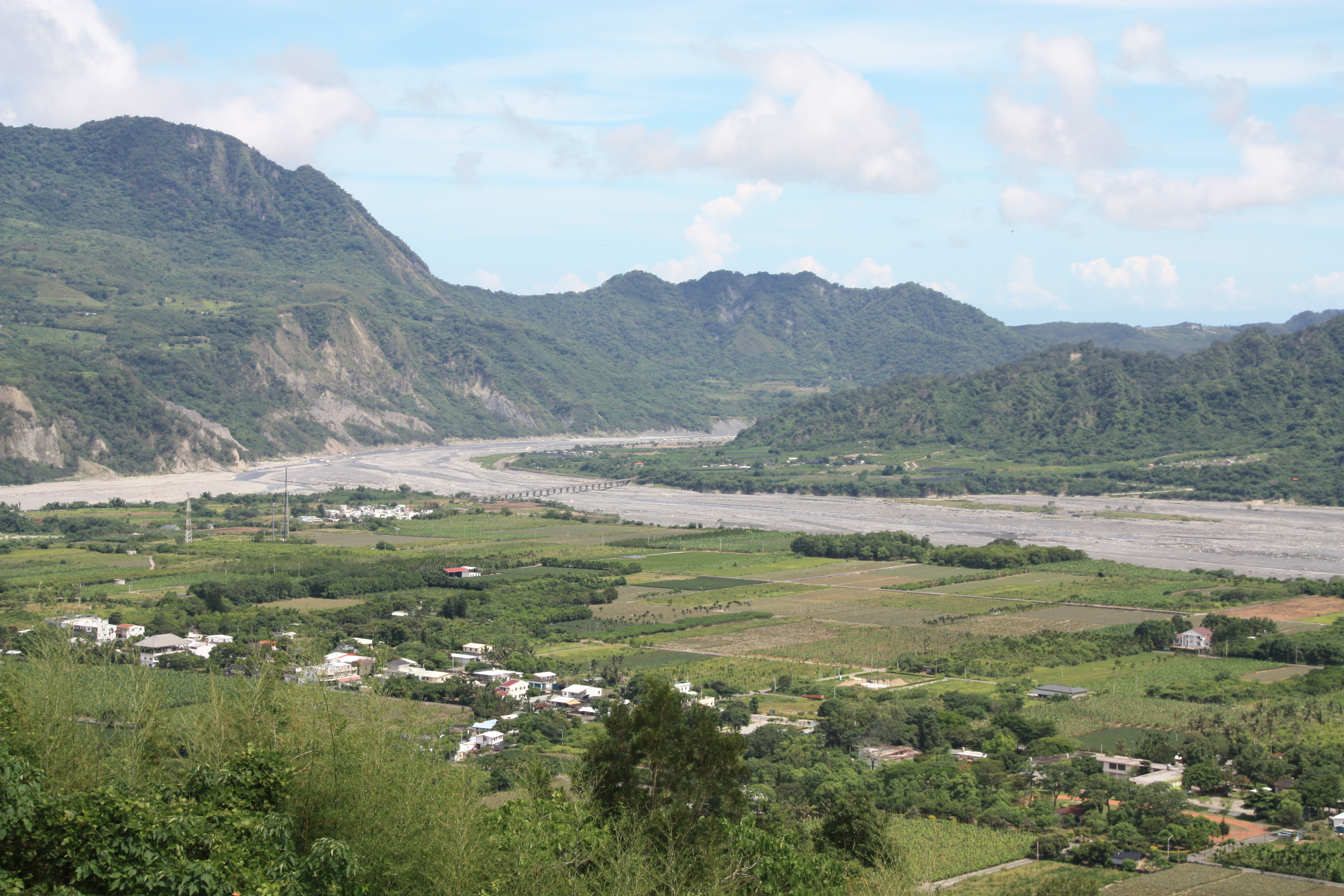

- Yanping Township in Taitung County
- Location: Taitung County, Taiwan

Area
  - Total: 456 km^{2} (176 sq mi)

Population (February 2023)
  - Total: 3,615
  - Density: 7.93/km^{2} (20.5/sq mi)

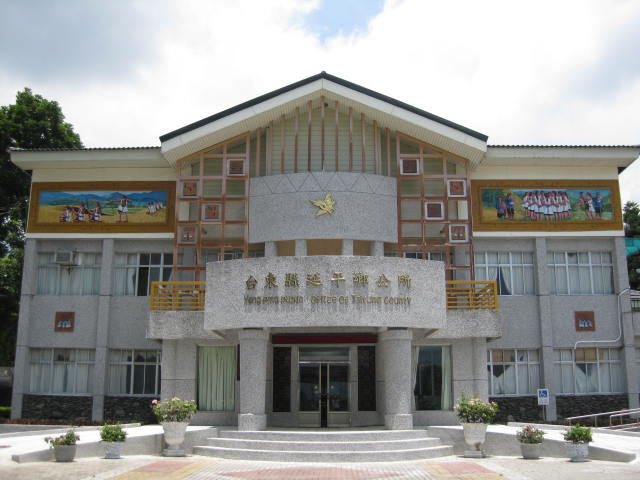
Yanping Township Office

Yanping Township (Chinese: 延平鄉; pinyin: Yánpíng Xiāng) is a mountain indigenous township in Taitung County, Taiwan. The main population is the Bunun people of the Taiwanese aborigines.

== Administrative divisions ==
The township comprises five villages: Hongye, Luanshan, Taoyuan, Wuling and Yongkang. Luanshan Village is not an enclave as it connects to Taoyuan Village via the Luye Creek.

== Tourist attractions ==
- Bunun Tribal Leisure Farm
- Dulan Mountain
- Hongye Hot Spring
- Hongye Teenage Baseball Memorial Hall
- Luming Suspension Bridge
- Tuoxian Leisure Farm
