= Sarijalu, Takab =

Village in West Azerbaijan province, Iran

Sarijalu Persian: ساري جالو
- Village
- Location within Iran
- Coordinates: 36°29′05″N 47°19′09″E
- Country: Iran
- Province: West Azerbaijan
- County: Takab
- District: Central
- Rural District: Afshar

Population (2016)
  - Total: 129
- Time zone: UTC+3:30 (IRST)

Sarijalu (Persian: ساري جالو) (Note: Also romanized as Sārījālū) is a village in Afshar Rural District of the Central District in Takab County, West Azerbaijan province, Iran.

== Demographics ==
=== Population ===
At the time of the 2006 National Census, the village's population was 141 in 28 households. The following census in 2011 counted 129 people in 36 households. The 2016 census measured the population of the village as 129 people in 39 households.
