= Tappeh Bur, West Azerbaijan =

Village in West Azerbaijan province, Iran

Tappeh Bur Persian: تپه بور
- Village
- Location within Iran
- Coordinates: 36°21′57″N 46°59′13″E
- Country: Iran
- Province: West Azerbaijan
- County: Takab
- District: Central
- Rural District: Karaftu

Population (2016)
  - Total: 200
- Time zone: UTC+3:30 (IRST)

Tappeh Bur (Persian: تپه بور) (Note: Also romanized as Tappeh Būr) is a village in Karaftu Rural District of the Central District in Takab County, West Azerbaijan province, Iran.

== Demographics ==
=== Population ===
At the time of the 2006 National Census, the village's population was 328 in 64 households. The following census in 2011 counted 270 people in 56 households. The 2016 census measured the population of the village as 200 people in 49 households.
