= Afshar Rural District =

Rural district in West Azerbaijan province, Iran

Afshar Rural District Persian: دهستان افشار
- Rural District
- Location within Iran
- Coordinates: 36°27′N 47°17′E
- Country: Iran
- Province: West Azerbaijan
- County: Takab
- District: Central
- Established: 1987
- Capital: Owghul Beyg

Population (2016)
  - Total: 3,335
- Time zone: UTC+3:30 (IRST)

Afshar Rural District (Persian: دهستان افشار) is in the Central District of Takab County, West Azerbaijan province, Iran. Its capital is the village of Owghul Beyg.

== Demographics ==
=== Population ===
At the time of the 2006 National Census, the rural district's population was 4,265 in 917 households. There were 3,814 inhabitants in 1,039 households at the following census of 2011. The 2016 census measured the population of the rural district as 3,335 in 1,040 households. The most populous of its 26 villages was Owghul Beyg, with 930 people.

=== Other villages in the rural district ===
- Badarlu
- Badkharid
- Badmahmud
- Chahar Taq
- Feyzabad
- Qaleh Juq
- Qarah Qayah
- Qojur
- Sarijalu
- Yolqun Aghaj
