= Qoldarreh-ye Sofla =

Village in West Azerbaijan province, Iran

Qoldarreh-ye Sofla Persian: قلدره سفلي
- Village
- Location within Iran
- Coordinates: 36°23′43″N 46°56′46″E
- Country: Iran
- Province: West Azerbaijan
- County: Takab
- District: Central
- Rural District: Karaftu

Population (2016)
  - Total: 227
- Time zone: UTC+3:30 (IRST)

Qoldarreh-ye Sofla (Persian: قلدره سفلي) (Note: Also romanized as Qoldarreh-ye Soflá; also known as Qowldarreh-ye Soflá) is a village in Karaftu Rural District of the Central District in Takab County, West Azerbaijan province, Iran.

== Demographics ==
=== Population ===
At the time of the 2006 National Census, the village's population was 279 in 48 households. The following census in 2011 counted 283 people in 54 households. The 2016 census measured the population of the village as 227 people in 59 households.
