= Guzalan =

Village in East Azerbaijan province, Iran

Guzalan Persian: گوزالان
- Village
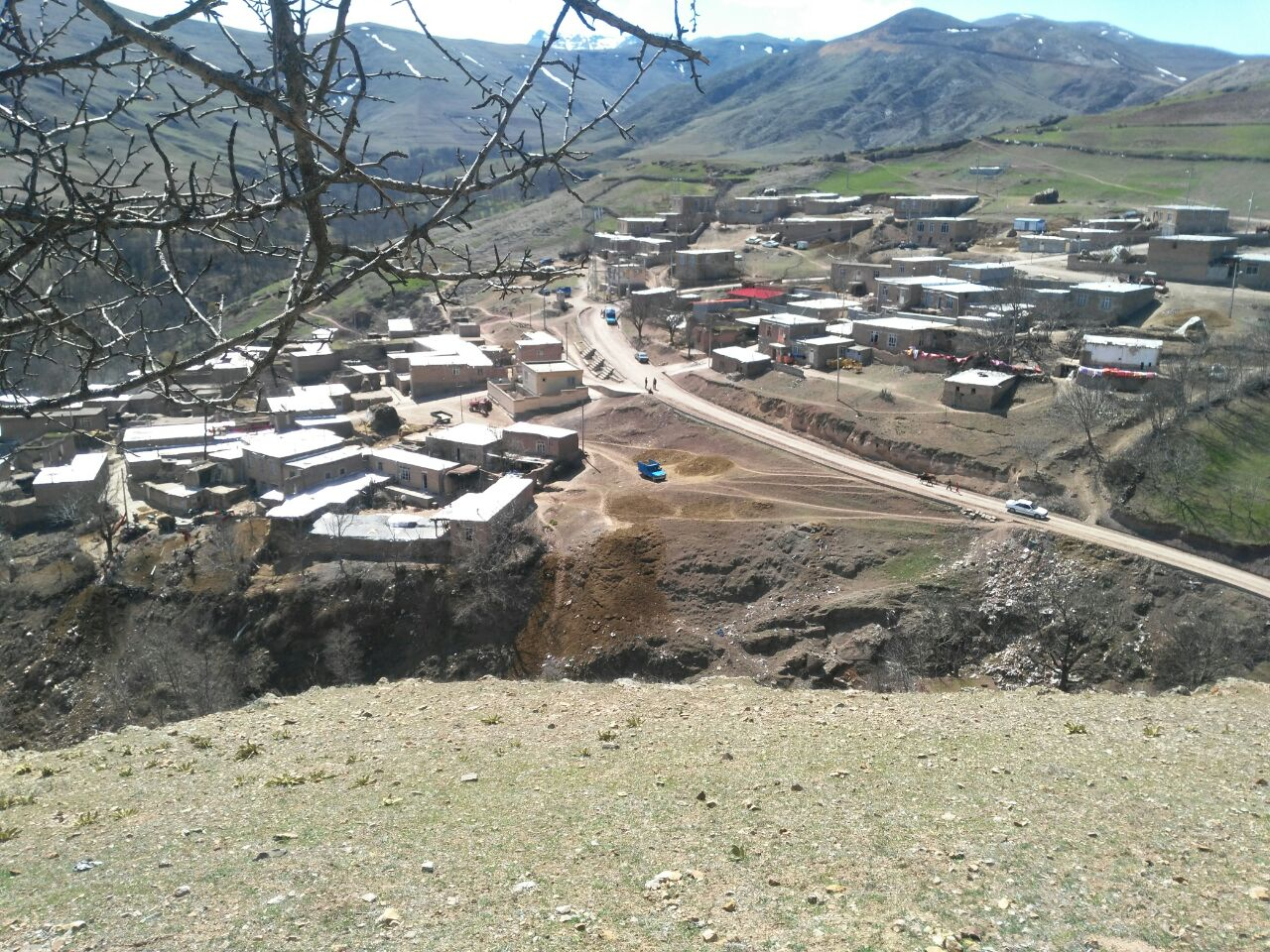
- The village of Guzalan in 2021

- Location within Iran
- Coordinates: 38°55′51″N 47°14′36″E
- Country: Iran
- Province: East Azerbaijan
- County: Kaleybar
- District: Central
- Rural District: Yeylaq

Population (2016)
  - Total: 357
- Time zone: UTC+3:30 (IRST)

Guzalan (Persian: گوزالان) (Note: Also romanized as Gavzalān, Goozalan, Gūzalān, and Gūzlān; also known as Gāvzāleh) is a village in Yeylaq Rural District of the Central District in Kaleybar County, East Azerbaijan province, Iran.

== Demographics ==
=== Population ===
At the time of the 2006 National Census, the village's population was 751 in 161 households. The following census in 2011 counted 331 people in 77 households. The 2016 census measured the population of the village as 357 people in 116 households.
