= Qerkhlu, Takab =

Village in West Azerbaijan province, Iran

Qerkhlu Persian: قرخلو
- Village
- Location within Iran
- Coordinates: 36°20′09″N 47°10′41″E
- Country: Iran
- Province: West Azerbaijan
- County: Takab
- District: Central
- Rural District: Ansar

Population (2016)
  - Total: 286
- Time zone: UTC+3:30 (IRST)

Qerkhlu (Persian: قرخلو) (Note: Also romanized as Qerkhlū) is a village in Ansar Rural District of the Central District in Takab County, West Azerbaijan province, Iran.

== Demographics ==
=== Population ===
At the time of the 2006 National Census, the village's population was 421 in 94 households. The following census in 2011 counted 337 people in 92 households. The 2016 census measured the population of the village as 286 people in 88 households.
