= Chap Darreh, West Azerbaijan =

Village in West Azerbaijan province, Iran

Chap Darreh Persian: چپدره
- Village
- Location within Iran
- Coordinates: 36°21′16″N 47°03′18″E
- Country: Iran
- Province: West Azerbaijan
- County: Takab
- District: Central
- Rural District: Karaftu

Population (2016)
  - Total: 623
- Time zone: UTC+3:30 (IRST)

Chap Darreh (Persian: چپدره) is a village in Karaftu Rural District of the Central District in Takab County, West Azerbaijan province, Iran.

== Demographics ==
=== Population ===
At the time of the 2006 National Census, the village's population was 623 in 121 households. The following census in 2011 counted 601 people in 135 households. The 2016 census measured the population of the village as 623 people in 172 households. It was the most populous village in its rural district.
