= Mount Dulan =

Mountain in Taitung County, Taiwan

- 都蘭山
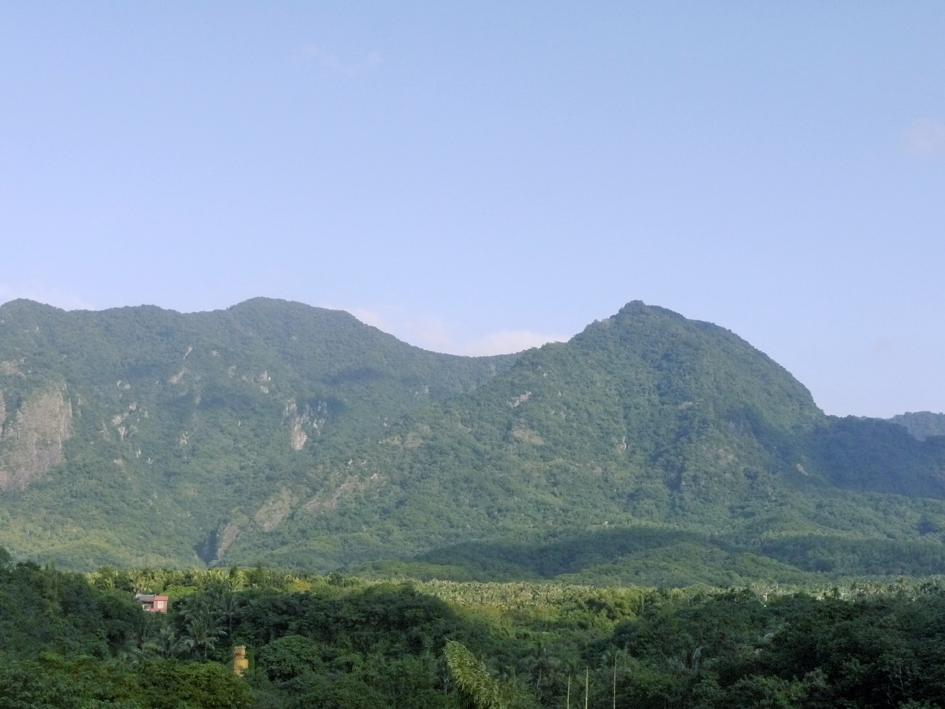

Highest point
- Elevation: 1,190 m (3,900 ft)
- Coordinates: 22°53′42.5″N 121°11′17.9″E

Geography
- Location: Donghe and Yanping, Taitung County, Taiwan

The Mount Dulan (traditional Chinese: 都蘭山; simplified Chinese: 都兰山; pinyin: Dūlán Shān) is a mountain in Donghe Township and Yanping Township of Taitung County, Taiwan.

It is part of the "Beinan Archaeological Site and Mt. Dulan" potential World Heritage Site.

== Geology ==
The mountain is located on Beinan Plain. It is fully covered by mid and low-altitude of broad-leaved trees. The peak stands at 1,190 meters (3,900 ft).

== Facilities ==
The mountain features a hiking trail starting from the foothill in Donghe Township.

== See also ==
- List of tourist attractions in Taiwan
- List of mountains in Taiwan
- Dulan Village, a scenic oceanside town at the foot of the mountain
- Beinan Cultural Park
