= Takab =

City in West Azerbaijan province, Iran

Takab Persian: تکاب Kurdish: Tîkab Azerbaijani: تیکان‌تپه
- City
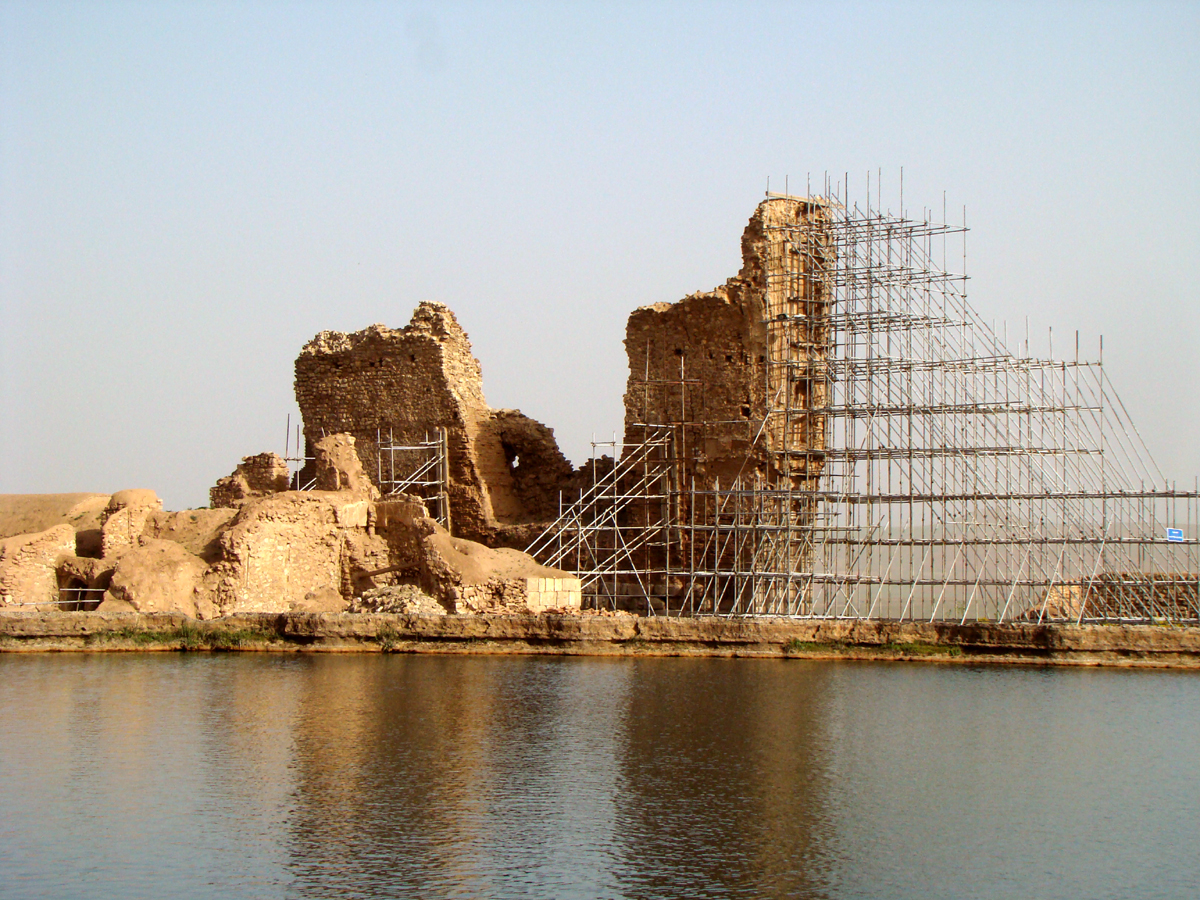
- Takht-e Soleyman in Takab county

- Location within Iran
- Coordinates: 36°24′03″N 47°06′39″E
- Country: Iran
- Province: West Azerbaijan
- County: Takab
- District: Central

Government
  - Governor (acting): Mahmud Zamani

Population (2016)
  - Total: 49,677
- Time zone: UTC+3:30 (IRST)

Takab (Persian: تکاب) (Note: Also romanized as Takāb and Tekab; also known as Takan Tepe; Azerbaijani: تیکان‌تپه; Kurdish: تیکاب, romanized as Tîkab) is a city in the Central District of Takab County, West Azerbaijan province, Iran, serving as capital of both the county and the district.

The famous historical complex Takht-e Soleymān is situated to the North-East of the city. Takht-e-Soleyman was one of Takab's oldest Zoroastrian fire temples during the Sasanian era and had the name Azargoshnasp. The Karaftu Caves are also situated in Takab near Saqqez.

== Etymology ==
Shiz is the ancient name used during Persian Empire for Takab. Takab means one narrow water way in the Persian language. Tak means one or alone and Ab means water. Takab was originally known as Tikan Təpə by its native Turkic Afshar people until 1941 when Iran's Academy of Persian Language and Literature officially changed it to Takab. Afshar people are one of the Oghuz Turkic peoples. These originally nomadic Oghuz tribes moved from Central Asia and initially settled in Iranian Azerbaijan, Azerbaijan republic, and Eastern Turkey. Later some of them were relocated by the Safavids to Khorasan and Mazandaran.

== Demographics ==
=== Language, ethnicity, and religion ===
The predominant language spoken in the city is Azerbaijani, while the predominant religion is Shia Islam. Minority Kurdish tribes include Shekak, Sharani, Moslanlu and Zafranlu, while most of the Azerbaijani population is of the Afshar tribe. The Azerbaijanis have also been described as 'Turkmans'. Nowadays out of twenty-three neighborhoods in Takab city, ten neighborhoods are completely inhabited by Azerbaijanis and four neighborhoods are mostly inhabited by Azerbaijanis, and six neighborhoods are completely inhabited by Kurds and three neighborhoods are mostly inhabited by Kurds.

=== Population ===
At the time of the 2006 National Census, the city's population was 43,702 in 10,078 households. The following census in 2011 counted 44,040 people in 11,749 households. The 2016 census measured the population of the city as of 49,677 people in 14,369 households.

== Climate ==
Climate data for Takab (coordinates:36°24′N 47°6′E, 1986-2010 normals)
Month	Jan	Feb	Mar	Apr	May	Jun	Jul	Aug	Sep	Oct	Nov	Dec	Year
Mean daily maximum °C (°F)	0.5 (32.9)	2.4 (36.3)	8.3 (46.9)	15.0 (59.0)	20.4 (68.7)	27.2 (81.0)	31.4 (88.5)	31.4 (88.5)	26.5 (79.7)	19.0 (66.2)	10.4 (50.7)	4.1 (39.4)	16.4 (61.5)
Daily mean °C (°F)	−4.2 (24.4)	−2.4 (27.7)	2.9 (37.2)	8.7 (47.7)	13.1 (55.6)	18.1 (64.6)	22.5 (72.5)	22.1 (71.8)	17.1 (62.8)	11.4 (52.5)	4.5 (40.1)	−0.6 (30.9)	9.4 (49.0)
Mean daily minimum °C (°F)	−8.9 (16.0)	−7.3 (18.9)	−2.4 (27.7)	2.5 (36.5)	5.8 (42.4)	8.9 (48.0)	13.5 (56.3)	12.7 (54.9)	7.7 (45.9)	3.7 (38.7)	−1.3 (29.7)	−5.4 (22.3)	2.5 (36.4)
Average precipitation mm (inches)	32.3 (1.27)	36.7 (1.44)	45.8 (1.80)	65.6 (2.58)	39.4 (1.55)	8.1 (0.32)	4.0 (0.16)	4.4 (0.17)	2.8 (0.11)	24.1 (0.95)	40.8 (1.61)	34.6 (1.36)	338.6 (13.32)
Average relative humidity (%)	76	74	66	60	53	40	35	32	34	49	64	72	55
Average dew point °C (°F)	−8.0 (17.6)	−7.5 (18.5)	−4.0 (24.8)	0.3 (32.5)	2.8 (37.0)	3.7 (38.7)	6.0 (42.8)	4.7 (40.5)	1.0 (33.8)	0.2 (32.4)	−2.2 (28.0)	−5.5 (22.1)	−0.7 (30.7)
Mean monthly sunshine hours	133.6	153.5	192.0	218.0	286.3	337.5	354.4	344.5	316.8	251.1	183.8	129.0	2,900.5
Source: IRIMO(dew point and sun 1986-2005)

== Economy ==
The majority of residents of Takab earn their income from agriculture. Takab is home to the biggest gold mine in the entire country and one of the biggest in the Middle East.

== Notable people ==
- Shahriar Afshar, Iranian-American physicist and inventor.
- Esmaeil Zolfi, Iranian businessman and philanthropist.
