= Kali Quzi =

Village in East Azerbaijan province, Iran

Kali Quzi Persian: كلي قوزي
- Village
- Location within Iran
- Coordinates: 38°49′17″N 47°10′30″E
- Country: Iran
- Province: East Azerbaijan
- County: Kaleybar
- District: Central
- Rural District: Yeylaq

Population (2016)
  - Total: 339
- Time zone: UTC+3:30 (IRST)

Kali Quzi (Persian: كلي قوزي) (Note: Also romanized as Kalī Qūzī; also known as Golī Qūzī, Kolī, and Kollī) is a village in Yeylaq Rural District of the Central District in Kaleybar County, East Azerbaijan province, Iran.

== Demographics ==
=== Population ===
At the time of the 2006 National Census, the village's population was 394 in 85 households. The following census in 2011 counted 353 people in 101 households. The 2016 census measured the population of the village as 339 people in 112 households.
