= Old Donghe Bridge =

Bridge in Taitung County, Taiwan

Old Donghe Bridge 舊東河橋
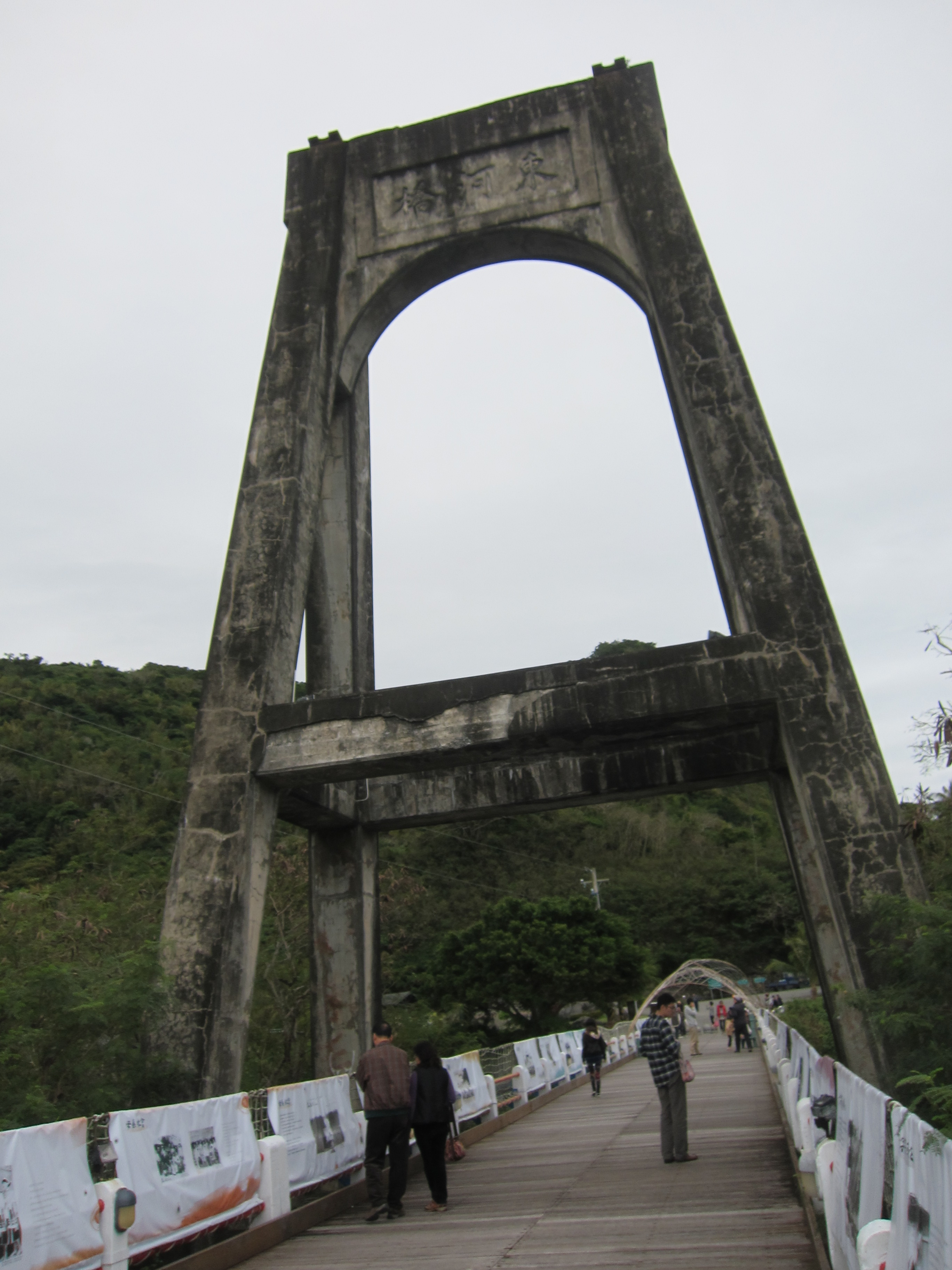
- Coordinates: 22°58′33.9″N 121°18′17.5″E
- Locale: Chenggong and Donghe in Taitung County, Taiwan
- Other name: Jikuen Bridge

Characteristics
- Design: suspension bridge
- Material: Concrete
- Total length: 127 meters
- Width: 4.65 meters

History
- Opened: 1926
- Rebuilt: 1953

Location
- Interactive map of Old Donghe Bridge

The Old Donghe Bridge or Old Tungho Bridge (traditional Chinese: 舊東河橋; simplified Chinese: 旧东河桥; pinyin: Jiù Dōnghé Qiáo) is a bridge in Taitung County, Taiwan. It connects Chenggong Township and Donghe Township over Mawuku River.

== History ==
The bridge was designed and built in 1926 by the Japanese under the name Jikuen Bridge as a suspension bridge. It was the longest bridge designed during the Japanese rule of Taiwan. In 1953, the bridge was rebuilt due to damage caused by typhoon by maintaining the original height of the towers at each end. Currently, the bridge is opened only for pedestrians.

== Architecture ==
The bridge is 127 meters long and 4.65 meters wide made of concrete. At the northern end in Chenggong Township side, it has an arch-shaped pier and sits on top of hard limestone soil foundation. At the southern end in Donghe Township side, it has framed pier and sits on top of soft sedimentary rock foundation.

== See also ==
- List of bridges in Taiwan
