= Meqas-e Qadim =

Meqas-e Qadim مقاس قديم
- Village
- Location within Iran
- Coordinates: 38°51′00″N 47°04′00″E
- Country: Iran
- Province: East Azerbaijan
- County: Kaleybar
- Bakhsh: Central
- Rural District: Yeylaq

Population (2006)
  - Total: 40
- Time zone: UTC+3:30 (IRST)
  - Summer (DST): UTC+4:30 (IRDT)

Meqas-e Qadim (Persian: مقاس قديم, also Romanized as Meqās-e Qadīm; also known as Meqyās-e Qadīm) is a village in Yeylaq Rural District, in the Central District of Kaleybar County, East Azerbaijan Province, Iran. At the 2006 census, its population was 40, in 11 families.
