= Meqas-e Jadid =

Meqas-e Jadid مقاس جديد
- Village
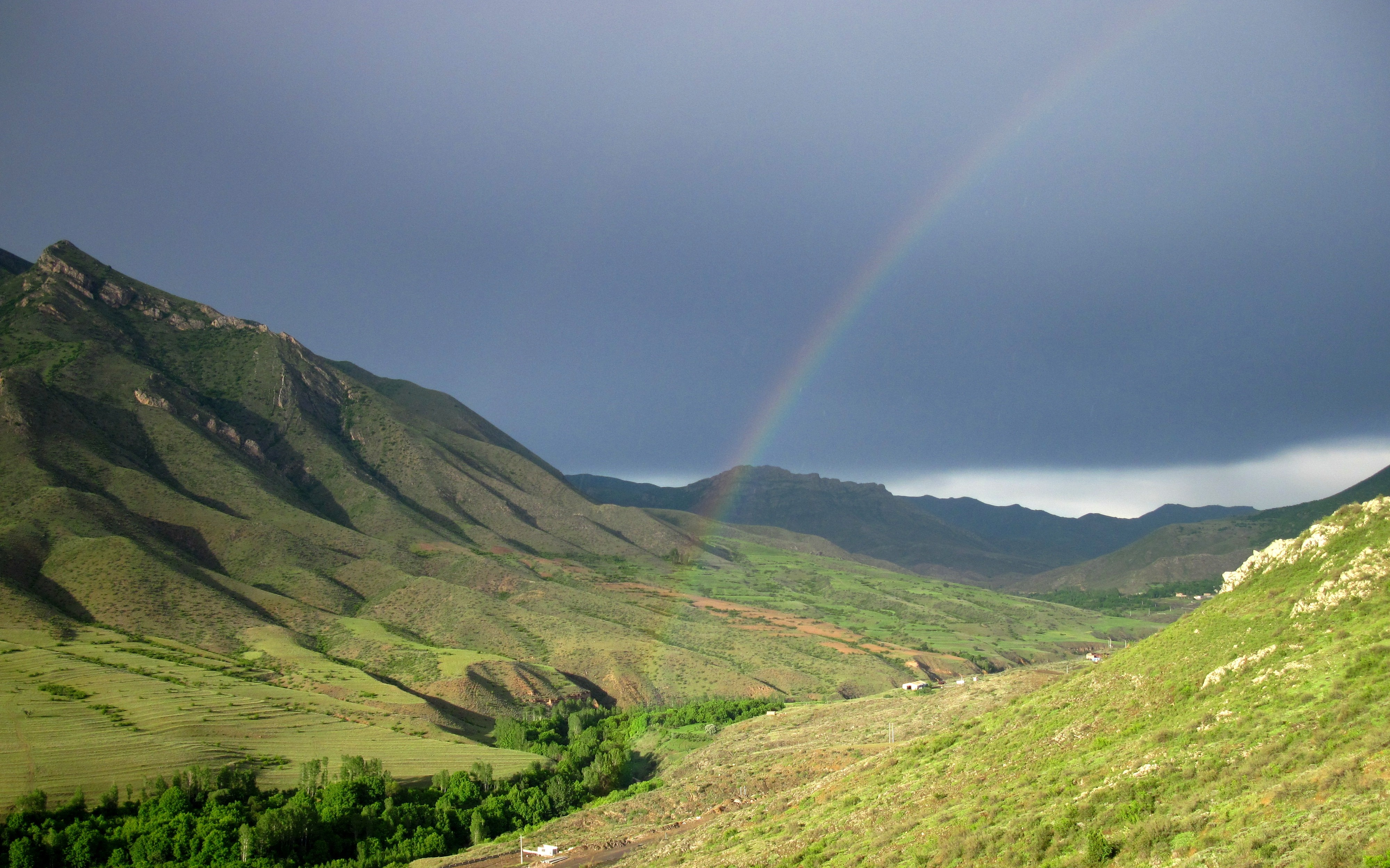
- 2013

- Location within Iran
- Coordinates: 38°52′00″N 47°05′00″E
- Country: Iran
- Province: East Azerbaijan
- County: Kaleybar
- Bakhsh: Central
- Rural District: Yeylaq

Population (2006)
  - Total: 143
- Time zone: UTC+3:30 (IRST)
  - Summer (DST): UTC+4:30 (IRDT)

Meqas-e Jadid (Persian: مقاس جدید, also Romanized as Meqās-e Jadīd; also known as Meqyās-e Jadīd) is a village in Yeylaq Rural District, in the Central District of Kaleybar County, East Azerbaijan Province, Iran. At the 2006 census, its population was 143, in 30 families. According to a more recent statistics the population is 135 people in 38 families, which indicates a significant increase in the number of households while population is declining.
