= Bunun Tribal Leisure Farm =

Farm in Yanping, Taitung County, Taiwan

Bunun Tribal Leisure Farm 布農部落休閒農場
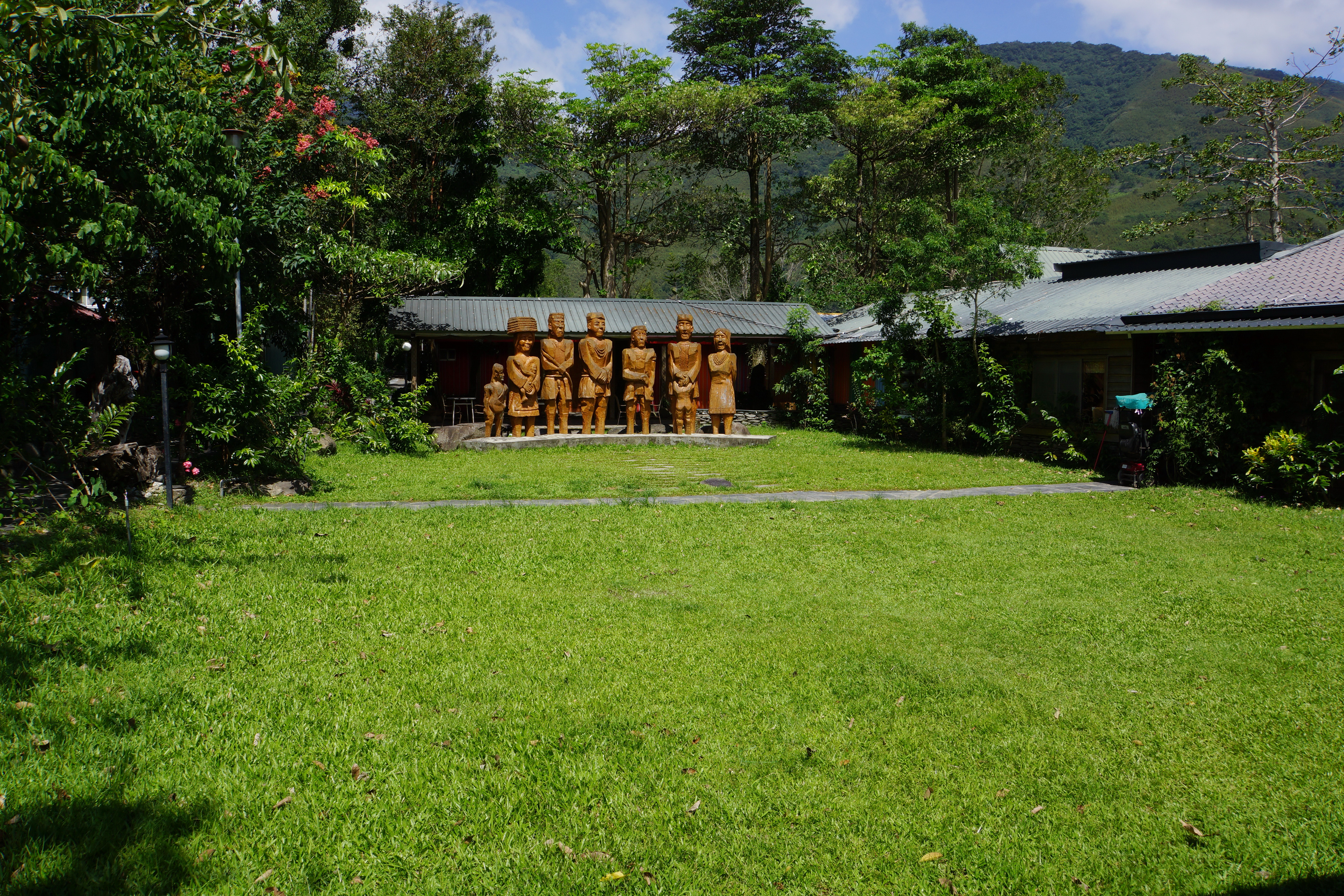

- Location within Taiwan
- Town/City: Yanping, Taitung County, Taiwan
- Coordinates: 22°54′21.2″N 121°05′27.6″E
- Established: 1985
- Website: Official website (in Chinese)

The Bunun Leisure Farm or Bunun Tribal Leisure Farm (traditional Chinese: 布農部落休閒農場; simplified Chinese: 布农部落休闲农场; pinyin: Bùnóng Bùluò Xiūxián Nóngchǎng) is a recreational farm about Bunun people in Taoyuan Village, Yanping Township, Taitung County, Taiwan.

== History ==
The farm area used to be the cluster area of Bunun people to live. In 1985, the Bunun Foundation was established by Mr. and Mrs. Bai Kwan-sheng, and subsequently the Bunun Leisure Farm was built.

== Activities ==
Various activities from livestock feeding, vegetables plucking etc. can be done in the farm. Daily Bunun traditional shows are also performed at the farm.

== Facilities ==
The farm features 68 suits of accommodation with Bunun exterior architectural style. It also has theater, studio, art center, coffee shop, restaurants, park etc.

== See also ==
- List of tourist attractions in Taiwan
