= Ansar Rural District =

Rural district in West Azerbaijan province, Iran

Ansar Rural District Persian: دهستان انصار
- Rural District
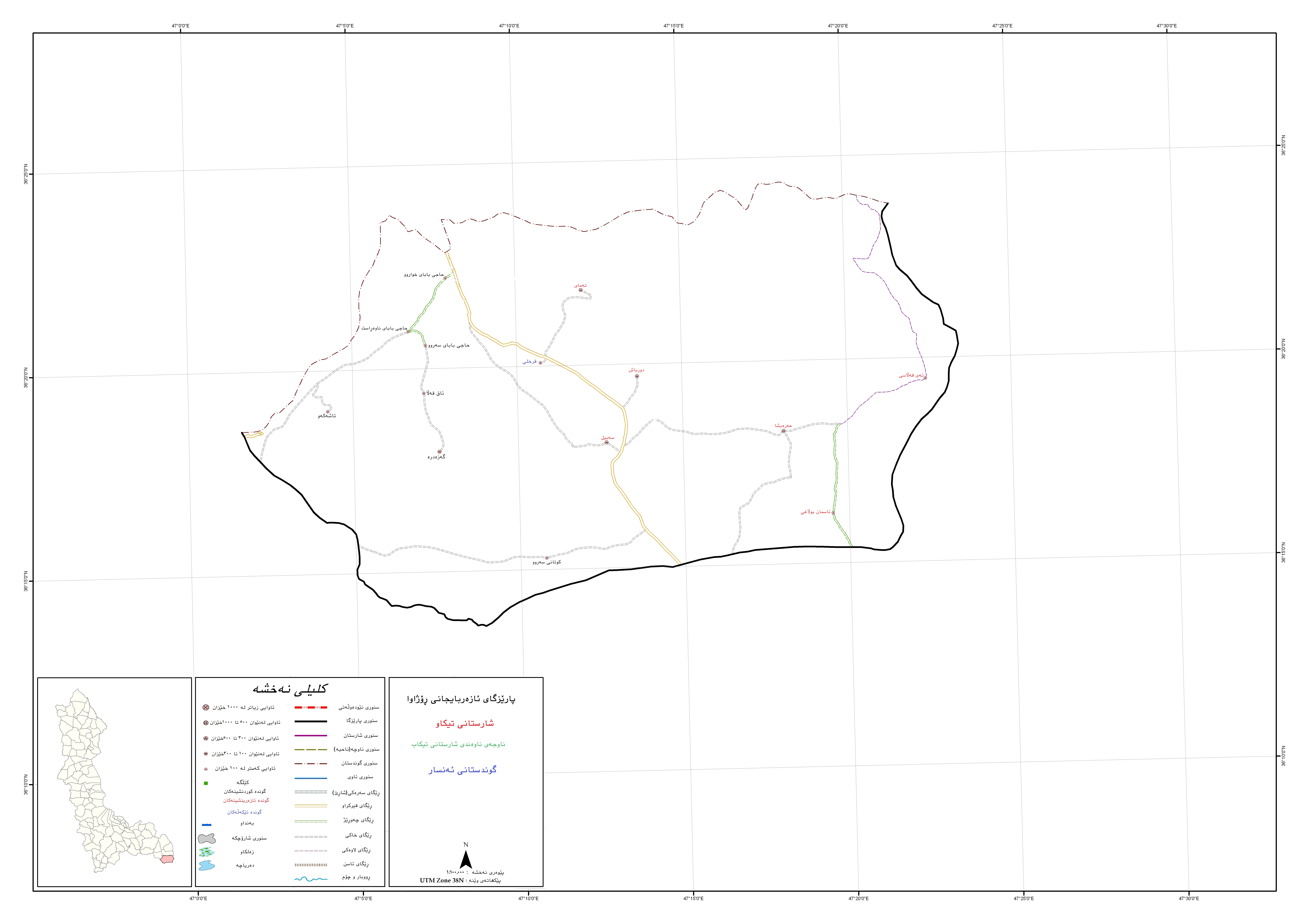
- District outline

- Location within Iran
- Coordinates: 36°20′N 47°16′E
- Country: Iran
- Province: West Azerbaijan
- County: Takab
- District: Central
- Established: 1987
- Capital: Dur Bash

Population (2016)
  - Total: 4,242
- Time zone: UTC+3:30 (IRST)

Ansar Rural District (Persian: دهستان انصار) is in the Central District of Takab County, West Azerbaijan province, Iran. Its capital is the village of Dur Bash.

== Demographics ==
=== Population ===
At the time of the 2006 National Census, the rural district's population was 5,846 in 1,155 households. There were 4,918 inhabitants in 1,299 households at the following census of 2011. The 2016 census measured the population of the rural district as 4,242 in 1,259 households. The most populous of its 20 villages was Dur Bash, with 729 people.

=== Other villages in the rural district ===
- Aq Qaleh
- Arabshah
- Asman Bolaghi
- Ayqalehsi
- Gaz Darreh
- Hajji Babay-e Olya
- Hajji Babay-e Sofla
- Hajji Babay-e Vosta
- Kutan-e Olya
- Qerkhlu
- Sabil
- Tamay
- Tasheh Kabud
