= Pireh Yusefian-e Sofla =

Pireh Yusefian-e Sofla پيره يوسفيان سفلي
- Village
- Location within Iran
- Coordinates: 38°58′00″N 47°13′00″E
- Country: Iran
- Province: East Azerbaijan
- County: Kaleybar
- Bakhsh: Central
- Rural District: Yeylaq

Population (2006)
  - Total: 68
- Time zone: UTC+3:30 (IRST)
  - Summer (DST): UTC+4:30 (IRDT)

Pireh Yusefian-e Sofla (Persian: پيره يوسفيان سفلي, also Romanized as Pīreh Yūsefīān-e Soflá) is a village in Yeylaq Rural District, in the Central District of Kaleybar County, East Azerbaijan Province, Iran. At the 2006 census, its population was 68, in 20 families.
