= Arabshah-e Khargushan =

Arabshah-e Khargushan عربشاه خرگوشان
- Village
- Location within Iran
- Coordinates: 38°53′00″N 47°12′00″E
- Country: Iran
- Province: East Azerbaijan
- County: Kaleybar
- Bakhsh: Central
- Rural District: Yeylaq

Population (2006)
  - Total: 184
- Time zone: UTC+3:30 (IRST)
  - Summer (DST): UTC+4:30 (IRDT)

Arabshah-e Khargushan (Persian: عربشاه خرگوشان, also Romanized as ‘Arabshāh-e Khargūshān) is a village in Yeylaq Rural District, in the Central District of Kaleybar County, East Azerbaijan Province, Iran. At the 2006 census, its population was 184, in 35 families.
