= Arabshah-e Daraq =

Arabshah-e Daraq عربشاه درق
- Village
- Location within Iran
- Coordinates: 38°54′00″N 47°13′00″E
- Country: Iran
- Province: East Azerbaijan
- County: Kaleybar
- Bakhsh: Central
- Rural District: Yeylaq

Population (2006)
  - Total: 16
- Time zone: UTC+3:30 (IRST)
  - Summer (DST): UTC+4:30 (IRDT)

Arabshah-e Daraq (Persian: عربشاه درق, also romanized as ‘Arabshāh-e Daraq) is a village in Yeylaq Rural District, in the Central District of Kaleybar County, East Azerbaijan Province, Iran. At the 2006 census, its population was 16, in 4 families.
