= Dulan, Iran =

Dulan دولان
- Village
- Location within Iran
- Coordinates: 38°57′00″N 47°08′00″E
- Country: Iran
- Province: East Azerbaijan
- County: Kaleybar
- Bakhsh: Central
- Rural District: Yeylaq

Population (2006)
  - Total: 92
- Time zone: UTC+3:30 (IRST)
  - Summer (DST): UTC+4:30 (IRDT)

Dulan (Persian: دولان, also Romanized as Dūlān) is a village in Yeylaq Rural District, in the Central District of Kaleybar County, East Azerbaijan Province, Iran. At the 2006 census, its population was 92, in 16 families.
