= Arabshah, Takab =

Village in West Azerbaijan province, Iran

Arabshah Persian: عربشاه
- Village
- Location within Iran
- Coordinates: 36°18′17″N 47°18′07″E
- Country: Iran
- Province: West Azerbaijan
- County: Takab
- District: Central
- Rural District: Ansar

Population (2016)
  - Total: 460
- Time zone: UTC+3:30 (IRST)

Arabshah (Persian: عربشاه) (Note: Also romanized as ‘Arabshāh) is a village in Ansar Rural District of the Central District in Takab County, West Azerbaijan province, Iran.

== Demographics ==
=== Population ===
At the time of the 2006 National Census, the village's population was 538 in 104 households. The following census in 2011 counted 471 people in 116 households. The 2016 census measured the population of the village as 471 people in 116 households.
