= Qoldarreh-ye Olya =

Village in West Azerbaijan province, Iran

Qoldarreh-ye Olya Persian: قلدره عليا
- Village
- Location within Iran
- Coordinates: 36°21′59″N 46°56′22″E
- Country: Iran
- Province: West Azerbaijan
- County: Takab
- District: Central
- Rural District: Karaftu

Population (2016)
  - Total: 323
- Time zone: UTC+3:30 (IRST)

Qoldarreh-ye Olya (Persian: قلدره عليا) (Note: Also romanized as Qoldarreh-ye ‘Olyā; also known as Qowldarreh-ye ‘Olyā) is a village in Karaftu Rural District of the Central District in Takab County, West Azerbaijan province, Iran.

== Demographics ==
=== Population ===
At the time of the 2006 National Census, the village's population was 479 in 89 households. The following census in 2011 counted 432 people in 86 households. The 2016 census measured the population of the village as 323 people in 77 households.
