= Qerekhlu, Urmia =

Qerekhlu قرخلو
- Village
- Location within Iran
- Coordinates: 37°40′00″N 45°06′00″E
- Country: Iran
- Province: West Azerbaijan
- County: Urmia
- Bakhsh: Central
- Rural District: Nazluy-ye Jonubi

Population (2006)
  - Total: 93
- Time zone: UTC+3:30 (IRST)
  - Summer (DST): UTC+4:30 (IRDT)

Qerekhlu (Persian: قرخلو, also Romanized as Qerkhlu , Gherkhloo, Gherekhloo) is a village in Nazluy-ye Jonubi Rural District, in the Central District of Urmia County, West Azerbaijan Province, Iran. At the 2006 census, its population was 93, in 30 families.
