= Sarijalu, Urmia =

Sarijalu ساريجالو
- Village
- Location within Iran
- Coordinates: 37°41′15″N 45°10′02″E
- Country: Iran
- Province: West Azerbaijan
- County: Urmia
- Bakhsh: Central
- Rural District: Bash Qaleh

Population (2006)
  - Total: 228
- Time zone: UTC+3:30 (IRST)
  - Summer (DST): UTC+4:30 (IRDT)

Sarijalu (Persian: ساريجالو, also Romanized as Sārījālū) is a village in Bash Qaleh Rural District, in the Central District of Urmia County, West Azerbaijan Province, Iran. At the 2006 census, its population was 228, in 72 families.
