= Tappeh Bur, Kermanshah =

Tappeh Bur تپه بور
- Village
- Location within Iran
- Coordinates: 34°46′26″N 46°31′31″E
- Country: Iran
- Province: Kermanshah
- County: Javanrud
- Bakhsh: Central
- Rural District: Palanganeh

Population (2006)
  - Total: 29
- Time zone: UTC+3:30 (IRST)
  - Summer (DST): UTC+4:30 (IRDT)

Tappeh Bur (Persian: تپه بور, also Romanized as Tappeh Būr; also known as Tappeh Var and Tepe Būr) is a village in Palanganeh Rural District, in the Central District of Javanrud County, Kermanshah Province, Iran. At the 2006 census, its population was 29, in 5 families.
