= Dulan, Taiwan =

Village in Donghe, Taitung, Taiwan

Coordinates: 22.8746°N 121.2269°E

Dulan or Tulan, transliterated from the Ami name A'tolan, Mandarin: 都蘭, pinyin: Dōulán) is a village in the Donghe Township of Taitung County, Taiwan. It is located between the Pacific Ocean and Dulan Mountain in Dulan National Forest (都蘭林場) on Taiwan's southeast coast. Due to the rise in tourism, many Han people have moved to Dulan. However, the Dulan tribe still preserve many customs of the Ami. Local venue Sintung Sugar Factory Culture Parka (a repurposed sugar mill) hosts frequent art fairs and live music nights in which many varied art forms of the First Taiwanese are displayed. The town's name is easily mispronounced by foreigners as 都爛 (dōulàn), which is slang for "crappy".

== Birthplace of the Ami people ==
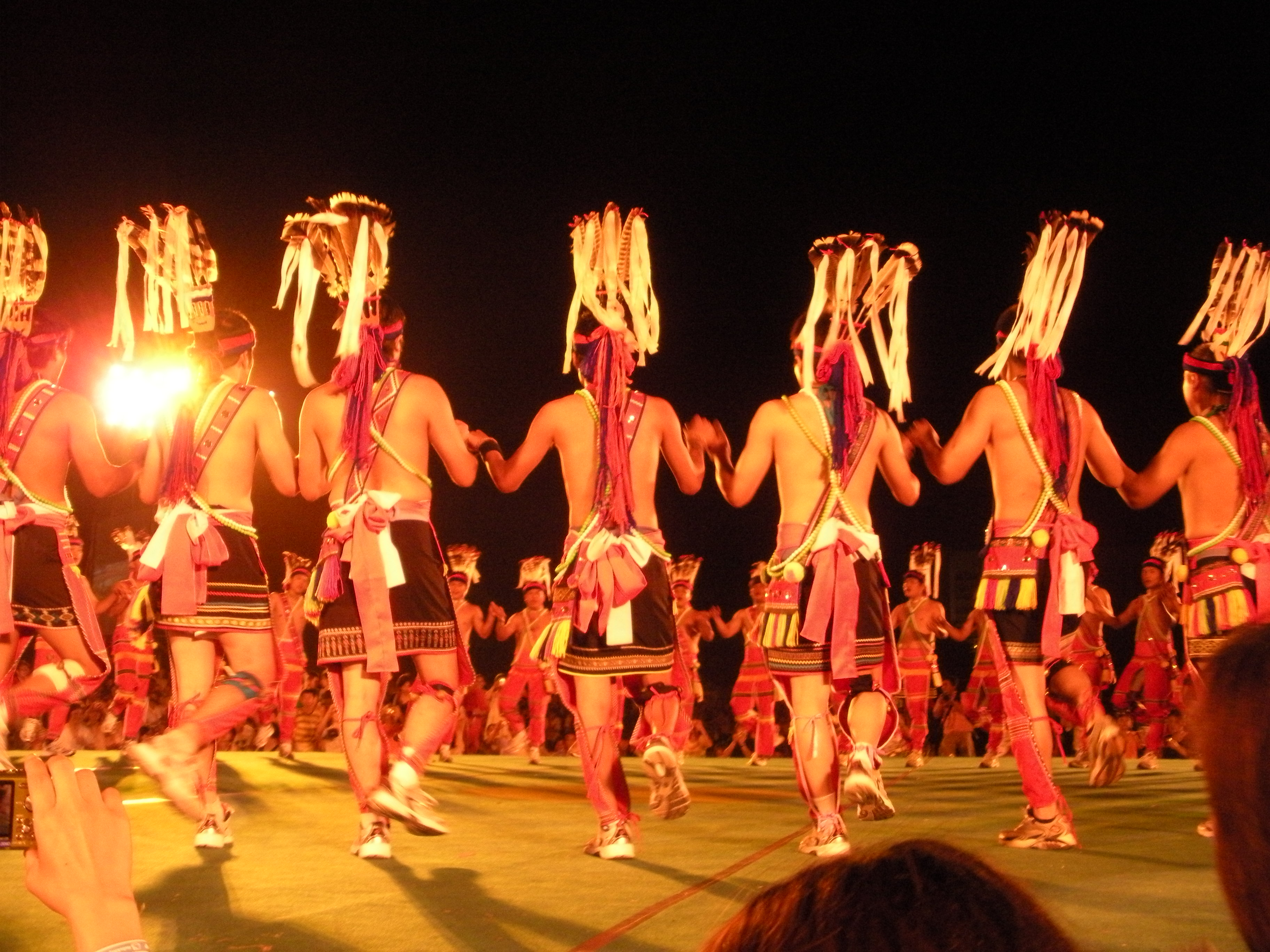

According to oral records and textual research, as early as 1500 B.C. the Ami people lived in Dulan, then called Gegalasan. It was later renamed A'tolan (or Etolan), which means "pile of stones" or "frequent earthquakes". Dulan is considered the "Birthplace of the Ami People". It was briefly renamed "Tudor" during the period of Japanese occupation, but was restored to Dulan in 1937.

== Dulan as tourist destination ==
Dulan draws many visitors from the West, China, and from other parts of Taiwan. It is a popular spot for surfing.

== Attractions ==
- Sintung Sugar Factory Culture Park
- Water Flowing Up (水往上流)
- Dulan Bay (都蘭灣)
- Dulan Nose (都蘭鼻)
- Dulan Site
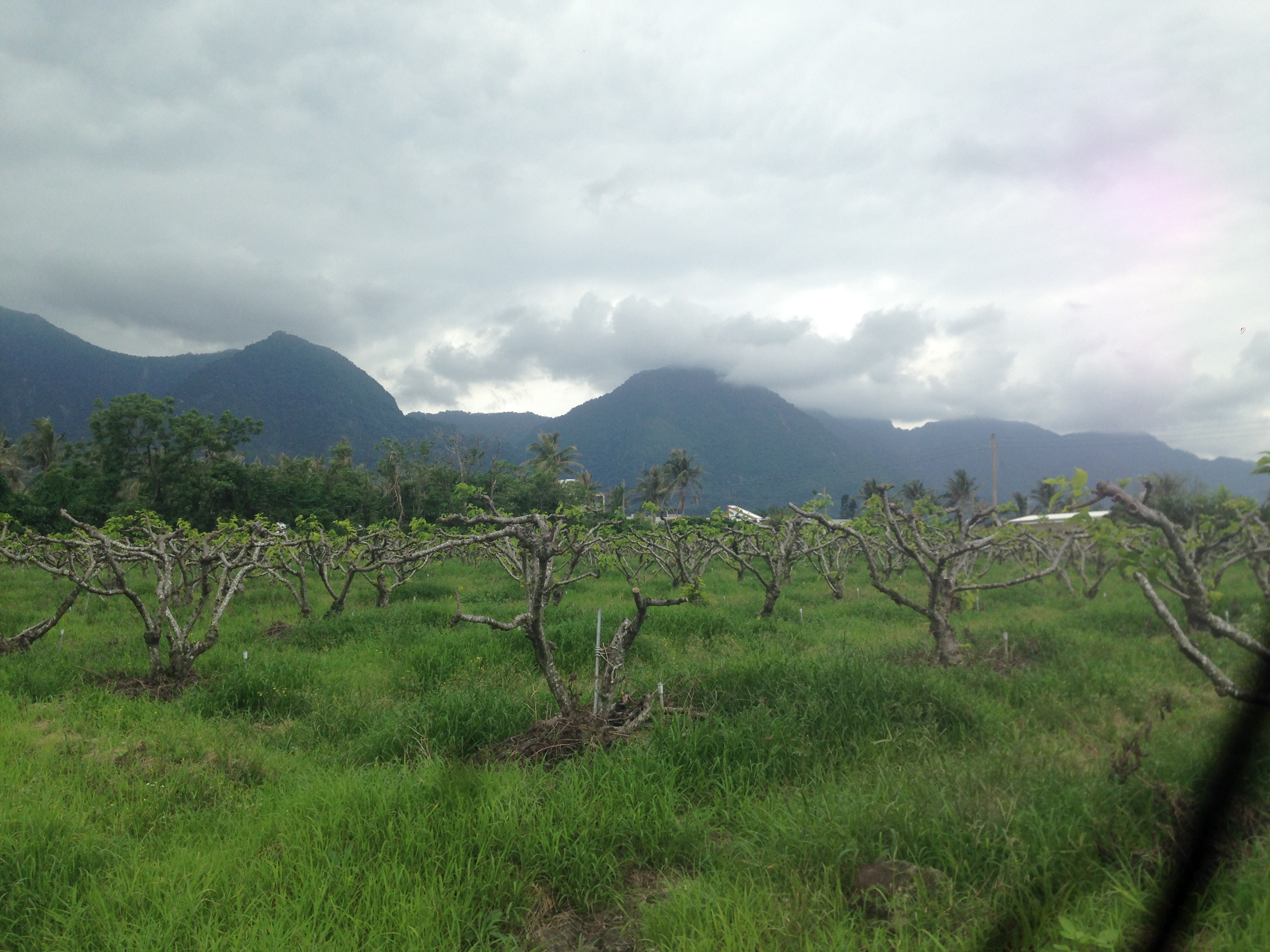
