= Chay Kandi-ye Kheyr ol Din =

Chay Kandi-ye Kheyr ol Din چاي كندي خيرالدين
- Village
- Location within Iran
- Coordinates: 38°27′39″N 46°36′15″E
- Country: Iran
- Province: East Azerbaijan
- County: Varzaqan
- Bakhsh: Central
- Rural District: Ozomdel-e Jonubi

Population (2006)
  - Total: 177
- Time zone: UTC+3:30 (IRST)
  - Summer (DST): UTC+4:30 (IRDT)

Chay Kandi-ye Kheyr ol Din (Persian: چاي كندي خيرالدين, also Romanized as Chāy Kandī-ye Kheyr ol Dīn and Chāy Kandī-ye Kheyr ed Dīn; also known as Chāi Kand, Chāy Kandī, and Chaykendy) is a village in Ozomdel-e Jonubi Rural District, in the Central District of Varzaqan County, East Azerbaijan Province, Iran. At the 2006 census, its population was 177, in 37 families.
