= Sarijalu, East Azerbaijan =

Sarijalu ساری‌جالو
- Village
- Location within Iran
- Coordinates: 38°59′00″N 46°47′00″E
- Country: Iran
- Province: East Azerbaijan
- County: Khoda Afarin
- Bakhsh: Minjavan
- Rural District: Minjavan-e Sharqi

Population (2006)
  - Total: 382
- Time zone: UTC+3:30 (IRST)
  - Summer (DST): UTC+4:30 (IRDT)

Sarijalu (Persian: ساری‌جالو, also Romanized as Sārījālū, Sārī Jāllū, and Sari Jaloo; also known as ‘Alīābād, Sārī Khān, and Sarykhan) is a village in Minjavan-e Sharqi Rural District, Minjavan District, Khoda Afarin County, East Azerbaijan Province, Iran. At the 2006 census, its population was 382, in 96 families.
