= Gavar, Kaleybar =

Village in East Azerbaijan province, Iran

Gavar Persian: گوار
- Village
- Location within Iran
- Coordinates: 38°52′28″N 47°14′28″E
- Country: Iran
- Province: East Azerbaijan
- County: Kaleybar
- District: Central
- Rural District: Yeylaq

Population (2016)
  - Total: 293
- Time zone: UTC+3:30 (IRST)

Gavar (Persian: گوار) (Note: Also romanized as Gavār) is a village in Yeylaq Rural District of the Central District in Kaleybar County, East Azerbaijan province, Iran.

== Demographics ==
=== Population ===
At the time of the 2006 National Census, the village's population was 452 in 92 households. The following census in 2011 counted 380 people in 113 households. The 2016 census measured the population of the village as 293 people in 89 households.
