= Donghe, Taitung =

Rural township in Taitung County, Taiwan

Coordinates: 22°58′N 121°15′E

Donghe Township 東河鄉 Toran, Dulan
- Rural township
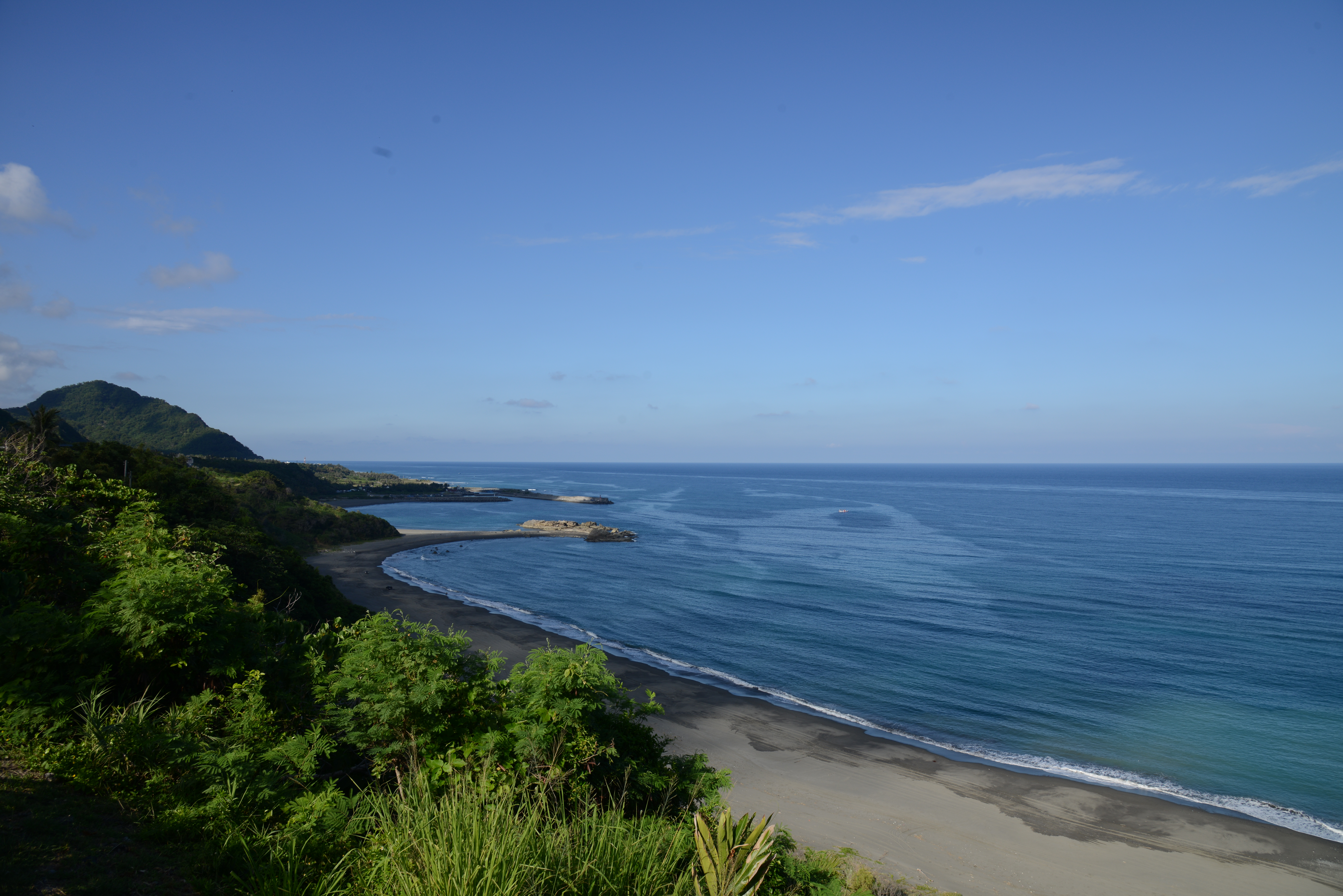
- The coastline in Donghe Township

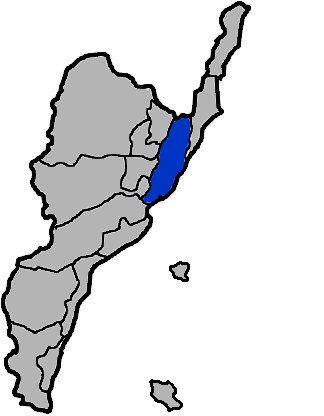
- Donghe Township in Taitung County
- Location: Taitung County, Taiwan

Area
  - Total: 210 km^{2} (81 sq mi)

Population (February 2023)
  - Total: 8,022
  - Density: 38/km^{2} (99/sq mi)
- Website: www.donghe.gov.tw (in Chinese)

Donghe Township (Chinese: 東河鄉; pinyin: Dōnghé Xiāng; Wade–Giles: Tung^{¹}-ho^{²} Hsiang^{¹}; lit. 'east river township') is a rural township located in northeastern Taitung County, Taiwan. The population is mainly the indigenous Amis people. The main industry is agriculture.

== History ==
Donghe Township was historically known as Fafokod (馬武窟), which means "fishing by net" in the Ami language. Many of its prehistory artifacts is found at Dulan Site.

Under Qing dynasty rule, the township was under the jurisdiction of the Pi-lam Subprefecture (卑南廳) and Taitung direct-controlled state (臺東直隸州) jurisdiction.

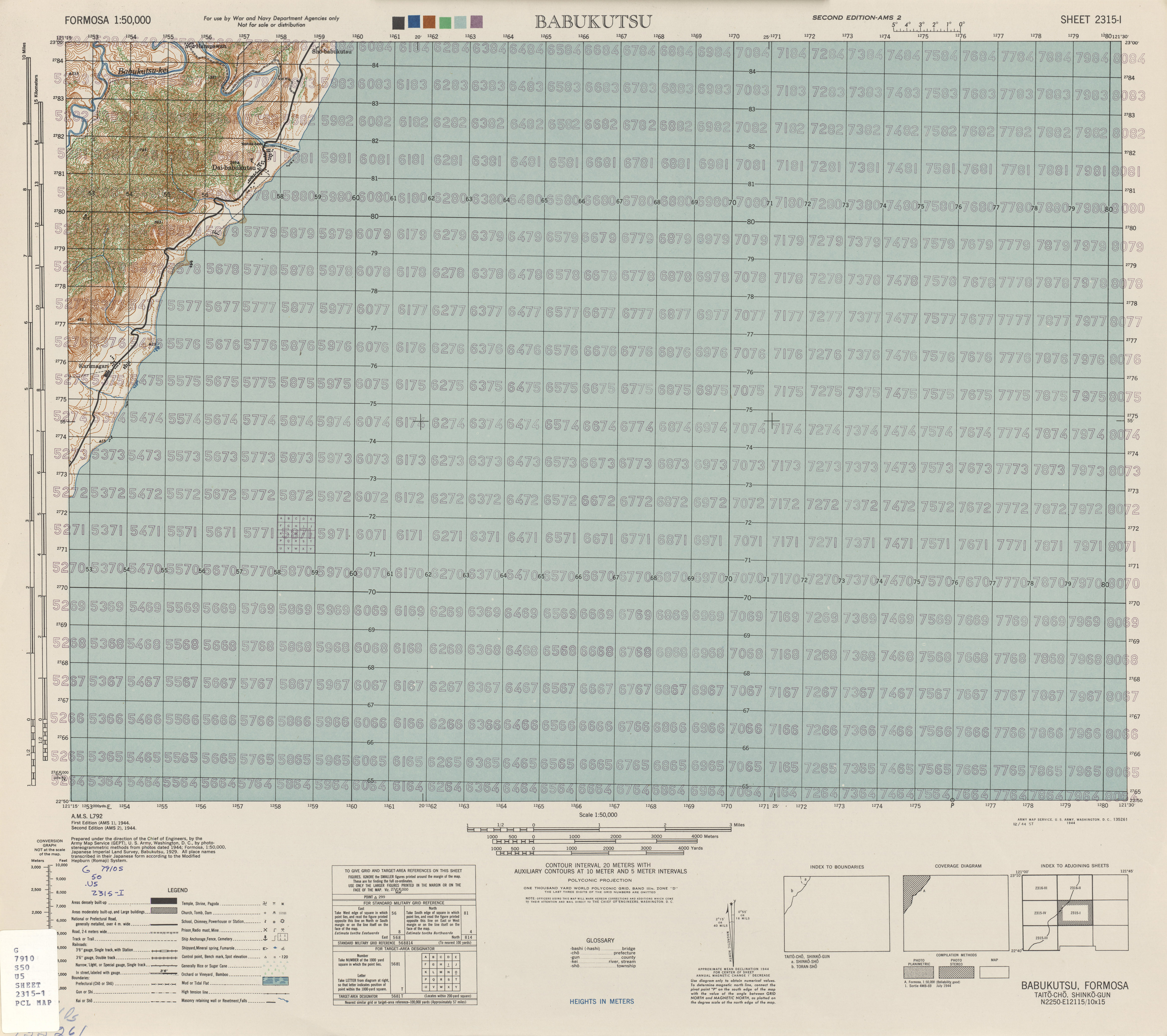
Map of the southeastern Donghe area (1944)

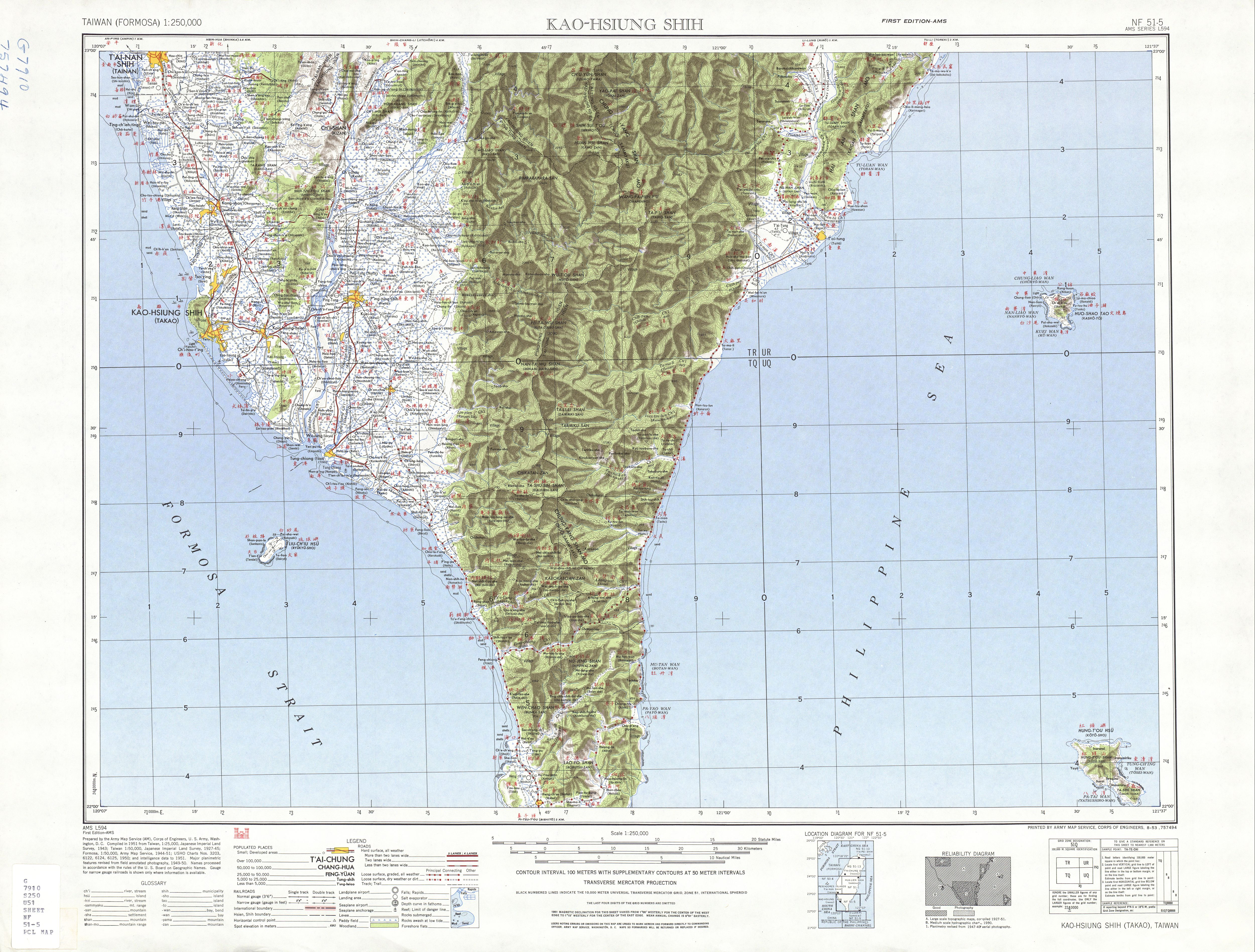
Map of the region including the southern Donghe area (1951)

In 1920, during the period of Japanese rule, the Toran local office (都蘭區役場) was set up. In 1937, it was changed to Toran Village (都蘭庄) under Shinkō District (新港郡), Taitō Prefecture. The name "Donghe Township" was established after World War II and is currently used.

== Geography ==
It is bounded on the northeast by Chenggong, east by Pacific Ocean, west by neighboring Chihshang Township, Guanshan Township, and Luye Township, and south by Beinan Township.

This township is located on the east side of coastal mountain range. It includes 60% of the hillside onshore, divided into coastal and basin areas with gradual upland slopes merging into relatively flat sea stage plains, the area of major development. Basin streams are mainly north–south because of the difficult terrain. Climate is tropical monsoon climate.

== Administrative divisions ==
- Beiyuan Village
- Doulan Village
- Longchang Village
- Shangde Village
- Taiyuan Village
- Tunghe Village
- Xingchang Village

== Education ==
=== Junior high schools ===
- Taitung County Dulan Junior High School

=== Elementary schools ===
- Donghe Elementary School, Dongher Township, Taiwan East County
- Dulan Elementary School, Donghe Township, Taitung County
- Sinlong School, Donghe Township, Taitung County
- Taiyuan Elementary School, Donghe Township, Taitung County

== Tourist attractions ==
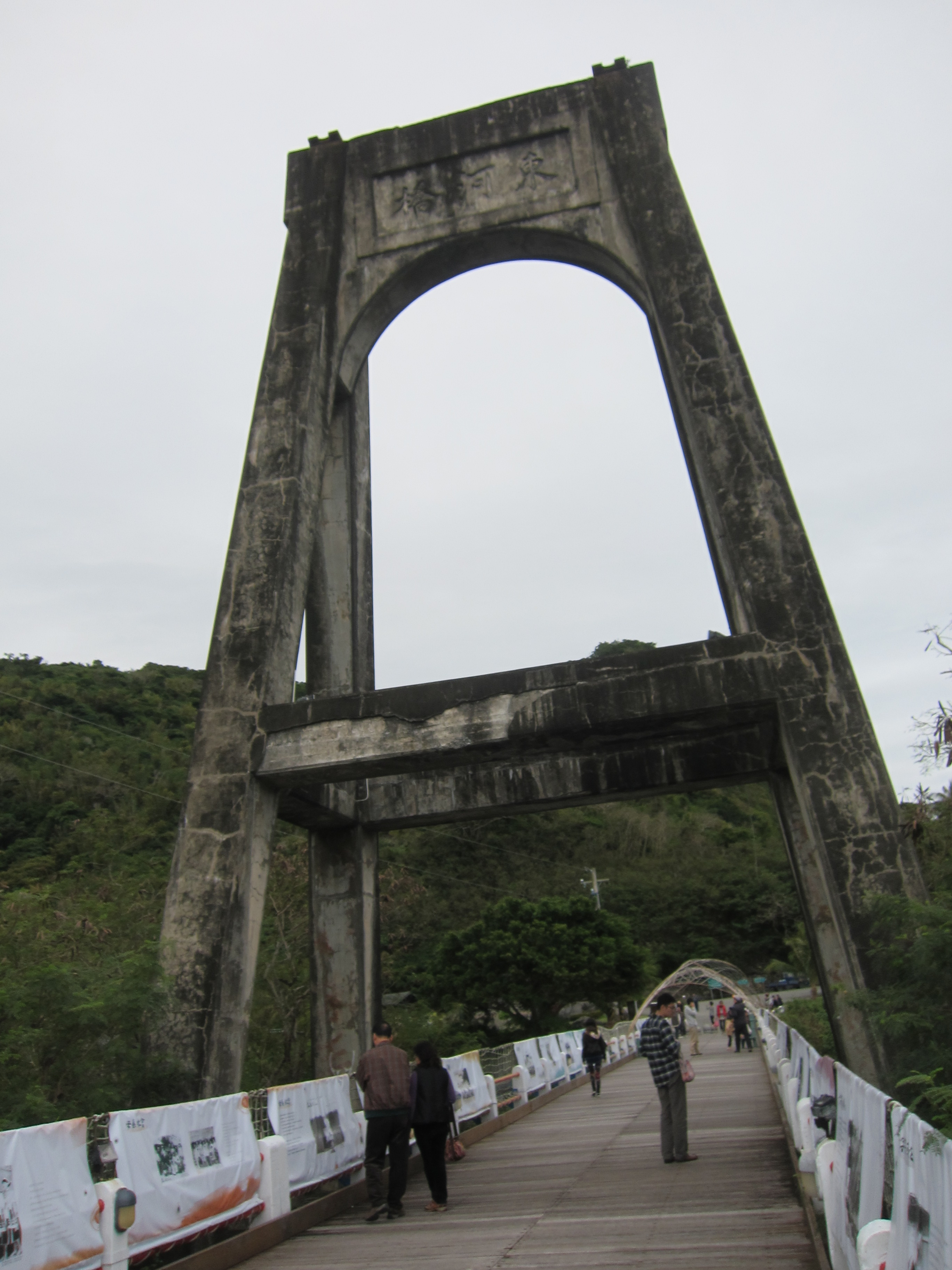
The Old Donghe Bridge over Mawuku Creek is one of the tourist attractions in Donghe.

- Dulan Mountain
- Dulan Site
- Jinzun Fish Port
- Old Donghe Bridge

== Transportation ==
- Provincial Highway 11
- Provincial Highway 23

== Notable natives ==
- Van Fan, singer and actor
- Yu Chang, professional baseball player
