= Hajji Babay-e Sofla =

Village in West Azerbaijan province, Iran

Hajji Babay-e Sofla Persian: حاجي باباي سفلي
- Village
- Location within Iran
- Coordinates: 36°22′16″N 47°07′55″E
- Country: Iran
- Province: West Azerbaijan
- County: Takab
- District: Central
- Rural District: Ansar

Population (2016)
  - Total: 135
- Time zone: UTC+3:30 (IRST)

Hajji Babay-e Sofla (Persian: حاجي باباي سفلي) (Note: Also romanized as Ḩājjī Bābāy-e Soflá; also known as Ḩājjī Bābā-ye Soflá) is a village in Ansar Rural District of the Central District in Takab County, West Azerbaijan province, Iran.

== Demographics ==
=== Population ===
At the time of the 2006 National Census, the village's population was 173 in 45 households. The following census in 2011 counted 130 people in 40 households. The 2016 census measured the population of the village as 135 people in 41 households.
