= Hajji Babay-e Olya =

Village in West Azerbaijan province, Iran

Hajji Babay-e Olya Persian: حاجي باباي عليا
- Village
- Location within Iran
- Coordinates: 36°20′36″N 47°07′17″E
- Country: Iran
- Province: West Azerbaijan
- County: Takab
- District: Central
- Rural District: Ansar

Population (2016)
  - Total: 80
- Time zone: UTC+3:30 (IRST)

Hajji Babay-e Olya (Persian: حاجي باباي عليا) (Note: Also romanized as Ḩājjī Bābāy-e ‘Olyā; also known as Ḩājjī Bābā-ye ‘Olyā) is a village in Ansar Rural District of the Central District in Takab County, West Azerbaijan province, Iran.

== Demographics ==
=== Population ===
At the time of the 2006 National Census, the village's population was 144 in 30 households. The following census in 2011 counted 76 people in 19 households. The 2016 census measured the population of the village as 80 people in 22 households.
