= Hajji Babay-e Vosta =

Village in West Azerbaijan province, Iran

Hajji Babay-e Vosta Persian: حاجي باباي وسطي
- Village
- Location within Iran
- Coordinates: 36°20′55″N 47°06′41″E
- Country: Iran
- Province: West Azerbaijan
- County: Takab
- District: Central
- Rural District: Ansar

Population (2016)
  - Total: 173
- Time zone: UTC+3:30 (IRST)

Hajji Babay-e Vosta (Persian: حاجي باباي وسطي) (Note: Also romanized as Ḩājjī Bābāy-e Vosţá; also known as Ḩājjī Bābā-ye Vosţá) is a village in Ansar Rural District of the Central District in Takab County, West Azerbaijan province, Iran.

== Demographics ==
=== Population ===
At the time of the 2006 National Census, the village's population was 262 in 53 households. The following census in 2011 counted 202 people in 62 households. The 2016 census measured the population of the village as 173 people in 51 households.
