= Chay Kandi, Kaleybar =

Village in East Azerbaijan province, Iran

Chay Kandi Persian: چاي كندي
- Village
- Location within Iran
- Coordinates: 38°50′52″N 47°07′20″E
- Country: Iran
- Province: East Azerbaijan
- County: Kaleybar
- District: Central
- Rural District: Yeylaq

Population (2016)
  - Total: 395
- Time zone: UTC+3:30 (IRST)

Chay Kandi (Persian: چاي كندي) (Note: Also romanized as Chāy Kandī) is a village in Yeylaq Rural District of the Central District in Kaleybar County, East Azerbaijan province, Iran.

== Demographics ==
=== Population ===
At the time of the 2006 National Census, the village's population was 512 in 112 households. The following census in 2011 counted 392 people in 106 households. The 2016 census measured the population of the village as 395 people in 127 households.
