= Qerrekhlu, Fars =

Qerrekhlu قرخلو
- Village
- Location within Iran
- Coordinates: 30°12′25″N 52°34′41″E
- Country: Iran
- Province: Fars
- County: Marvdasht
- Bakhsh: Dorudzan
- Rural District: Abarj

Population (2006)
  - Total: 544
- Time zone: UTC+3:30 (IRST)
  - Summer (DST): UTC+4:30 (IRDT)

Qerrekhlu (Persian: قرخلو, also Romanized as Qerrekhlū; also known as Qeretlī and Qerrekhlī) is a village in Abarj Rural District, Dorudzan District, Marvdasht County, Fars province, Iran. At the 2006 census, its population was 544, in 120 families.
