= Arabshah Khan =

Village in East Azerbaijan province, Iran

Arabshah Khan Persian: عربشاه خان
- Village
- Location within Iran
- Coordinates: 38°51′14″N 47°09′57″E
- Country: Iran
- Province: East Azerbaijan
- County: Kaleybar
- District: Central
- Rural District: Yeylaq

Population (2016)
  - Total: 512
- Time zone: UTC+3:30 (IRST)

Arabshah Khan (Persian: عربشاه خان) (Note: Also romanized as ‘Arabshāh Khān; also known as Harafsheh and Harūsheh) is a village in, and the capital of, Yeylaq Rural District in the Central District of Kaleybar County, East Azerbaijan province, Iran.

== Demographics ==
=== Population ===
At the time of the 2006 National Census, the village's population was 510 in 106 households. The following census in 2011 counted 396 people in 99 households. The 2016 census measured the population of the village as 512 people in 182 households. It was the most populous village in its rural district.
