= Dulan Site =

Archaeological site in Donghe, Taitung County, Taiwan

- 都蘭遺址 (Chinese)
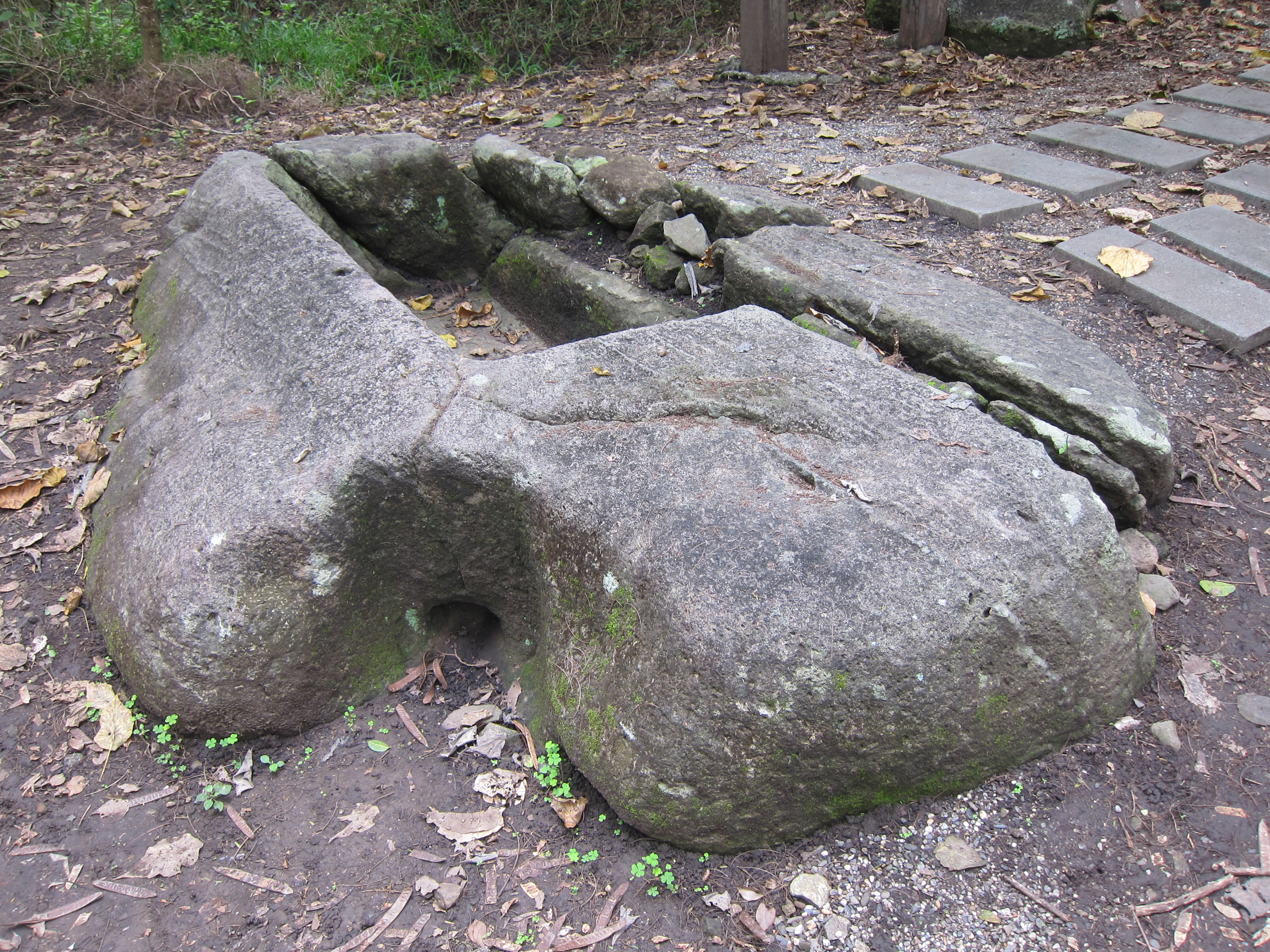

- Location within Taitung County
- 22°53′06.3″N 121°13′09.4″E
- Type: archaeological site
- Location: Donghe, Taitung County, Taiwan

The Dulan Site (traditional Chinese: 都蘭遺址; simplified Chinese: 都兰遗址; pinyin: Dōulán Yízhǐ) is an archaeological site in Dulan Village, Donghe Township, Taitung County, Taiwan.

== History ==
During Japanese rule of Taiwan, a rectangular stony coffin was excavated in the area. Further investigation by Academia Sinica led to the discovery of a giant stone pile. The site and objects date back to 3,000 years ago. It is now considered a cultural heritage and third grade historical site.

== Features ==
The area is divided into two areas, which are the stony coffin area and the stony wall area. Footpaths and explanatory signs are available within the vicinity.

== See also ==
- Prehistory of Taiwan
