= Karaftu Rural District =

Rural district in West Azerbaijan province, Iran

Karaftu Rural District Persian: دهستان كرفتو
- Rural District
- Location within Iran
- Coordinates: 36°24′N 46°57′E
- Country: Iran
- Province: West Azerbaijan
- County: Takab
- District: Central
- Established: 1987
- Capital: Qujeh

Population (2016)
  - Total: 3,205
- Time zone: UTC+3:30 (IRST)

Karaftu Rural District (Persian: دهستان كرفتو) is in the Central District of Takab County, West Azerbaijan province, Iran. Its capital is the village of Qujeh.

== Demographics ==
=== Population ===
At the time of the 2006 National Census, the rural district's population was 4,586 in 891 households. There were 3,792 inhabitants in 832 households at the following census of 2011. The 2016 census measured the population of the rural district as 3,205 in 885 households. The most populous of its 20 villages was Chap Darreh, with 623 people.

=== Other villages in the rural district ===
- Aliabad-e Nokhowd Darreh
- Boluz
- Darvish Rash
- Dash Bolagh
- Qoldarreh-ye Olya
- Qoldarreh-ye Sofla
- Sari Bagh
- Sari Qurkhan
- Tappeh Bur
- Yaharlu
