= Yeylaq Rural District (Kaleybar County) =

Rural district in East Azerbaijan province, Iran

Yeylaq Rural District Persian: دهستان ييلاق
- Rural District
- Location within Iran
- Coordinates: 38°53′N 47°08′E
- Country: Iran
- Province: East Azerbaijan
- County: Kaleybar
- District: Central
- Established: 1987
- Capital: Arabshah Khan

Population (2016)
  - Total: 2,763
- Time zone: UTC+3:30 (IRST)

Yeylaq Rural District (Persian: دهستان ييلاق) is in the Central District of Kaleybar County, East Azerbaijan province, Iran. Its capital is the village of Arabshah Khan.

== Demographics ==
=== Population ===
At the time of the 2006 National Census, the rural district's population was 3,846 in 838 households. There were 2,883 inhabitants in 794 households at the following census of 2011. The 2016 census measured the population of the rural district as 2,763 in 945 households. The most populous of its 28 villages was Arabshah Khan, with 512 people.

=== Other villages in the rural district ===
- Chay Kandi
- Gavar
- Guzalan
- Kali Quzi
