= Central District (Takab County) =

District in West Azerbaijan province, Iran

Central District (Takab County) Persian: بخش مرکزی شهرستان تکاب
- District
- Location within Iran
- Coordinates: 36°23′N 47°10′E
- Country: Iran
- Province: West Azerbaijan
- County: Takab
- Established: 1990
- Capital: Takab

Population (2016)
  - Total: 60,459
- Time zone: UTC+3:30 (IRST)

The Central District of Takab County (Persian: بخش مرکزی شهرستان تکاب) is in West Azerbaijan province, Iran. Its capital is the city of Takab.

== Demographics ==
=== Population ===
At the time of the 2006 National Census, the district's population was 58,399 in 13,041 households. The following census in 2011 counted 56,564 people in 14,919 households. The 2016 census measured the population of the district as 60,459 inhabitants in 17,553 households.

=== Administrative divisions ===
Central District (Takab County) Population
Administrative Divisions	2006	2011	2016
Afshar RD	4,265	3,814	3,335
Ansar RD	5,846	4,918	4,242
Karaftu RD	4,586	3,792	3,205
Takab (city)	43,702	44,040	49,677
Total	58,399	56,564	60,459
RD = Rural District
