= Aq Darreh =

Aq Darreh or Aqdarreh (Persian: اقدره) may refer to:

- Aq Darreh, East Azerbaijan
- Aq Darreh, Ahar, East Azerbaijan Province
- Aq Darreh, Hamadan
- Aqdarreh, Markazi
- Aqdarreh-ye Olya, West Azerbaijan Province
- Aqdarreh-ye Sofla, West Azerbaijan Province
- Aqdarreh-ye Vosta, West Azerbaijan Province
