= Tarmakchi =

Tarmakchi ترمكچي
- Village
- Location within Iran
- Coordinates: 36°29′19″N 47°00′52″E
- Country: Iran
- Province: West Azerbaijan
- County: Takab
- Bakhsh: Takht-e Soleyman
- Rural District: Saruq

Population (2006)
  - Total: 171
- Time zone: UTC+3:30 (IRST)
  - Summer (DST): UTC+4:30 (IRDT)

Tarmakchi (Persian: ترمكچي, also Romanized as Tarmakchī) is a village in Saruq Rural District, Takht-e Soleyman District, Takab County, West Azerbaijan Province, Iran. At the 2006 census, its population was 171, in 29 families.
