= Alasaqqal =

Alasaqqal الاسقل
- Village
- Location within Iran
- Coordinates: 36°29′13″N 47°02′34″E
- Country: Iran
- Province: West Azerbaijan
- County: Takab
- Bakhsh: Takht-e Soleyman
- Rural District: Saruq

Population (2006)
  - Total: 261
- Time zone: UTC+3:30 (IRST)
  - Summer (DST): UTC+4:30 (IRDT)

Alasaqqal (Persian: الاسقل, also romanized as Ālāsaqqal, Ālāsaqal, and Ālāsaqāl) is a village in Saruq Rural District, Takht-e Soleyman District, Takab County, West Azerbaijan Province, Iran. At the 2006 census, its population was 261, in 49 families.
