= Aq Otaq =

Aq Otaq اق اطاق
- Village
- Location within Iran
- Coordinates: 36°47′23″N 47°08′00″E
- Country: Iran
- Province: West Azerbaijan
- County: Takab
- Bakhsh: Takht-e Soleyman
- Rural District: Ahmadabad

Population (2006)
  - Total: 266
- Time zone: UTC+3:30 (IRST)
  - Summer (DST): UTC+4:30 (IRDT)

Aq Otaq (Persian: اق اطاق, also Romanized as Āq Oţāq; also known as Āgh Oţāq) is a village in Ahmadabad Rural District, Takht-e Soleyman District, Takab County, West Azerbaijan Province, Iran. At the 2006 census, its population was 266 citizens, including 58 families.
