= Qezel Qeshlaq =

Qezel Qeshlaq قزل قشلاق
- Village
- Location within Iran
- Coordinates: 36°33′20″N 47°12′12″E
- Country: Iran
- Province: West Azerbaijan
- County: Takab
- Bakhsh: Takht-e Soleyman
- Rural District: Chaman

Population (2006)
  - Total: 76
- Time zone: UTC+3:30 (IRST)
  - Summer (DST): UTC+4:30 (IRDT)

Qezel Qeshlaq (Persian: قزل قشلاق, also Romanized as Qezel Qeshlāq) is a village in Chaman Rural District, Takht-e Soleyman District, Takab County, West Azerbaijan Province, Iran. At the 2006 census, its population was 76, in 13 families.
