= Zenharkandi =

Zenharkandi زنهاركندي
- Village
- Location within Iran
- Coordinates: 36°32′39″N 47°04′48″E
- Country: Iran
- Province: West Azerbaijan
- County: Takab
- Bakhsh: Takht-e Soleyman
- Rural District: Ahmadabad

Population (2006)
  - Total: 127
- Time zone: UTC+3:30 (IRST)
  - Summer (DST): UTC+4:30 (IRDT)

Zenharkandi (Persian: زنهاركندي, also Romanized as Zenhārkandī; also known as Zīnhār) is a village in Ahmadabad Rural District, Takht-e Soleyman District, Takab County, West Azerbaijan Province, Iran. At the 2006 census, its population was 127, in 24 families.
