= Arabshah, Takht-e Soleyman =

Arabshah عربشاه
- Village
- Location within Iran
- Coordinates: 36°46′37″N 47°03′27″E
- Country: Iran
- Province: West Azerbaijan
- County: Takab
- Bakhsh: Takht-e Soleyman
- Rural District: Ahmadabad

Population (2006)
  - Total: 386
- Time zone: UTC+3:30 (IRST)
  - Summer (DST): UTC+4:30 (IRDT)

Arabshah (Persian: عربشاه, also Romanized as ‘Arabshāh) is a village in Ahmadabad Rural District, Takht-e Soleyman District, Takab County, West Azerbaijan Province, Iran. At the 2006 census, its population was 386, in 69 families.
