= Jodaqiyeh =

Jodaqiyeh or Jodaqayeh or Jedaqayah or Jedaqayeh (Persian: جداقيه) may refer to:

- Jodaqayeh, East Azerbaijan
- Jedaqayah, Kurdistan
- Jedaqayah, West Azerbaijan
- Jodaqiyeh, Zanjan
