= Zareh Shuran =

Zareh Shuran زره شوران
- Village
- Location within Iran
- Coordinates: 36°41′05″N 47°06′57″E
- Country: Iran
- Province: West Azerbaijan
- County: Takab
- Bakhsh: Takht-e Soleyman
- Rural District: Ahmadabad

Population (2006)
  - Total: 317
- Time zone: UTC+3:30 (IRST)
  - Summer (DST): UTC+4:30 (IRDT)

Zareh Shuran (Persian: زره شوران, also Romanized as Zareh Shūrān, Zarehshūrān, and Zereh Shūrān; also known as Zarshūrān) is a village in Ahmadabad Rural District, Takht-e Soleyman District, Takab County, West Azerbaijan Province, Iran. At the 2006 census, its population was 317, in 69 families.
