= Aq Daraq =

Aq Daraq or Aqdaraq (Persian: اق درق), also rendered as Agh Daraq, may refer to:

- Aq Daraq, Meshgin Shahr, Ardabil Province
- Aq Daraq, Nir, Ardabil Province
- Aqdaraq, Bostanabad, East Azerbaijan Province
- Aqdaraq-e Jadid, East Azerbaijan Province
- Aqdaraq-e Qadim, East Azerbaijan Province
