= Yengi Kand, Takab =

Yengi Kand ينگي كند
- Village
- Location within Iran
- Coordinates: 36°39′53″N 47°08′23″E
- Country: Iran
- Province: West Azerbaijan
- County: Takab
- Bakhsh: Takht-e Soleyman
- Rural District: Ahmadabad

Population (2006)
  - Total: 207
- Time zone: UTC+3:30 (IRST)
  - Summer (DST): UTC+4:30 (IRDT)

Yengi Kand (Persian: ينگي كند, also Romanized as Yengī Kand) is a village in Ahmadabad Rural District, Takht-e Soleyman District, Takab County, West Azerbaijan Province, Iran. At the 2006 census, its population was 207, in 40 families.
