= Arpachayi, West Azerbaijan =

Arpachayi ارپاچايي
- Village
- Location within Iran
- Coordinates: 36°48′22″N 47°06′12″E
- Country: Iran
- Province: West Azerbaijan
- County: Takab
- Bakhsh: Takht-e Soleyman
- Rural District: Ahmadabad

Population (2006)
  - Total: 251
- Time zone: UTC+3:30 (IRST)
  - Summer (DST): UTC+4:30 (IRDT)

Arpachayi (Persian: ارپاچايي, also Romanized as Ārpāchāyī; also known as Ārpāchāy) is a village in Ahmadabad Rural District, Takht-e Soleyman District, Takab County, West Azerbaijan Province, Iran. At the 2006 census, its population was 251, in 48 families.
