= Kuseh Piri =

Kuseh Piri كوسه پيري
- Village
- Location within Iran
- Coordinates: 36°32′05″N 47°01′19″E
- Country: Iran
- Province: West Azerbaijan
- County: Takab
- Bakhsh: Takht-e Soleyman
- Rural District: Saruq

Population (2006)
  - Total: 176
- Time zone: UTC+3:30 (IRST)
  - Summer (DST): UTC+4:30 (IRDT)

Kuseh Piri (Persian: كوسه پيري, also Romanized as Kūseh Pīrī) is a village in Saruq Rural District, Takht-e Soleyman District, Takab County, West Azerbaijan Province, Iran. At the 2006 census, its population was 176, in 33 families.
