= Dol Dol Bolaghi =

Dol Dol Bolaghi دل دلبلاغي
- Village
- Location within Iran
- Coordinates: 36°31′41″N 46°58′45″E
- Country: Iran
- Province: West Azerbaijan
- County: Takab
- Bakhsh: Takht-e Soleyman
- Rural District: Saruq

Population (2006)
  - Total: 115
- Time zone: UTC+3:30 (IRST)
  - Summer (DST): UTC+4:30 (IRDT)

Dol Dol Bolaghi (Persian: دل دلبلاغي, also Romanized as Dol Dol Bolāghī and Doldol Bolāghī) is a village in Saruq Rural District, Takht-e Soleyman District, Takab County, West Azerbaijan Province, Iran. At the 2006 census, its population was 115, in 24 families.
