= Ahmadabad-e Olya, West Azerbaijan =

Village in West Azerbaijan province, Iran

Ahmadabad-e Olya Persian: احمداباد عليا
- Village
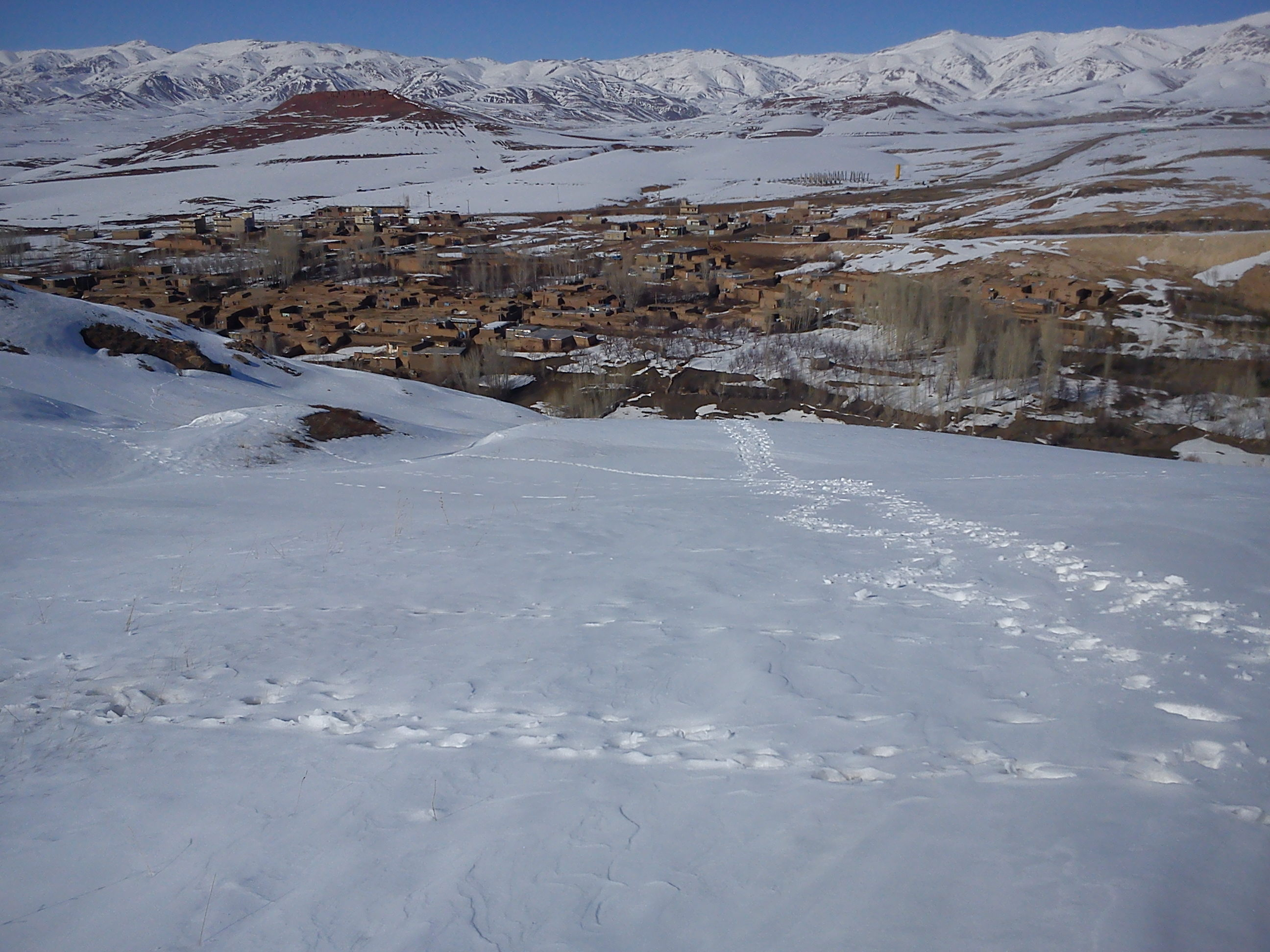
- The village of Ahmadabad-e Sofla

- Location within Iran
- Coordinates: 36°36′50″N 47°09′56″E
- Country: Iran
- Province: West Azerbaijan
- County: Takab
- District: Takht-e Soleyman
- Rural District: Ahmadabad

Population (2016)
  - Total: 432
- Time zone: UTC+3:30 (IRST)

Ahmadabad-e Olya (Persian: احمدابادعليا) (Note: Also romanized as Aḩmadābād ‘Olyā and Aḩmadābād-e ‘Olya; also known as Ahmad Ābād and Aḩmadābād-e Bālā) is a village in Ahmadabad Rural District (Note: Formerly Takht-e Soleyman Rural District) of Takht-e Soleyman District in Takab County, West Azerbaijan province, Iran.

== Demographics ==
=== Population ===
At the time of the 2006 National Census, the village's population was 471 in 96 households. The following census in 2011 counted 404 people in 100 households. The 2016 census measured the population of the village as 432 people in 138 households.
