= Kharkhar, Iran =

Kharkhar خارخار
- Village
- Location within Iran
- Coordinates: 36°27′36″N 46°55′16″E
- Country: Iran
- Province: West Azerbaijan
- County: Takab
- Bakhsh: Takht-e Soleyman
- Rural District: Saruq

Population (2006)
  - Total: 284
- Time zone: UTC+3:30 (IRST)
  - Summer (DST): UTC+4:30 (IRDT)

Kharkhar (Persian: خارخار, also Romanized as Khārkhār) is a village in Saruq Rural District, Takht-e Soleyman District, Takab County, West Azerbaijan Province, Iran. At the 2006 census, its population was 284, in 60 families.
