= Hampa =

Hampa or Hompa (Persian: همپا) may refer to:

== Places ==
- Hampa, East Azerbaijan
- Hampa, West Azerbaijan

== Titles ==
- Hompa, in the traditional leadership of Namibia a king of a tribe or clan
