= Qusha Bolagh, West Azerbaijan =

Village in West Azerbaijan province, Iran

Qusha Bolagh Persian: قوشابلاغ
- Village
- Location within Iran
- Coordinates: 36°30′17″N 47°14′43″E
- Country: Iran
- Province: West Azerbaijan
- County: Takab
- District: Takht-e Soleyman
- Rural District: Chaman

Population (2016)
  - Total: 128
- Time zone: UTC+3:30 (IRST)

Qusha Bolagh (Persian: قوشابلاغ) (Note: Also romanized as Qūshā Bolāgh; also known as Qūsheh Bolāgh) is a village in Chaman Rural District of Takht-e Soleyman District in Takab County, West Azerbaijan province, Iran.

== Demographics ==
=== Population ===
At the time of the 2006 National Census, the village's population was 172 in 36 households. The following census in 2011 counted 146 people in 41 households. The 2016 census measured the population of the village as 128 people in 42 households.
