= Aluchehluy =

Aluchehluy (Persian: الوچلوي), also rendered as Aluchehlu, may refer to:

- Aluchehluy-e Olya
- Aluchehluy-e Sofla
