= Qarah Bolagh, Takab =

Village in West Azerbaijan province, Iran

Qarah Bolagh Persian: قره بلاغ
- Village
- Location within Iran
- Coordinates: 36°31′58″N 47°13′44″E
- Country: Iran
- Province: West Azerbaijan
- County: Takab
- District: Takht-e Soleyman
- Rural District: Chaman

Population (2016)
  - Total: 165
- Time zone: UTC+3:30 (IRST)

Qarah Bolagh (Persian: قره بلاغ) (Note: Also romanized as Qarah Bolāgh and Qareh Bolāgh) is a village in, and the capital of, Chaman Rural District in Takht-e Soleyman District of Takab County, West Azerbaijan province, Iran.

== Demographics ==
=== Population ===
At the time of the 2006 National Census, the village had a population of 283 in 62 households. The 2011 census recorded 248 people in 58 households, while the 2016 census recorded 165 people in 52 households.
