= Guy Aghaj, West Azerbaijan =

Village in West Azerbaijan province, Iran

Guy Aghaj Persian: گوي اغاج
- Village
- Location within Iran
- Coordinates: 36°30′01″N 46°55′44″E
- Country: Iran
- Province: West Azerbaijan
- County: Takab
- District: Takht-e Soleyman
- Rural District: Saruq

Population (2016)
  - Total: 1,378
- Time zone: UTC+3:30 (IRST)

Guy Aghaj (Persian: گوي اغاج) (Note: Also romanized as Gūy Āghāj) is a village in Saruq Rural District of Takht-e Soleyman District in Takab County, West Azerbaijan province, Iran.

== Demographics ==
=== Population ===
At the time of the 2006 National Census, the village's population was 1,557 in 298 households. The following census in 2011 counted 1,486 people in 338 households. The 2016 census measured the population of the village as 1,378 people in 405 households.
