= Mayin Bolagh =

Village in West Azerbaijan province, Iran

Mayin Bolagh Persian: مايين بلاغ
- Village
- Location within Iran
- Coordinates: 36°31′03″N 46°53′02″E
- Country: Iran
- Province: West Azerbaijan
- County: Takab
- District: Takht-e Soleyman
- Rural District: Saruq

Population (2016)
  - Total: 276
- Time zone: UTC+3:30 (IRST)

Mayin Bolagh (Persian: مايين بلاغ) (Note: Also romanized as Main Bolagh and Mā’īn Bolāgh) is a village in Saruq Rural District of Takht-e Soleyman District in Takab County, West Azerbaijan province, Iran.

== Demographics ==
=== Population ===
At the time of the 2006 National Census, the village's population was 392 in 77 households. The following census in 2011 counted 315 people in 72 households. The 2016 census measured the population of the village as 276 people in 79 households.
