= Angurud, West Azerbaijan =

Village in West Azerbaijan province, Iran

Angurud Persian: انگورود
- Village
- Location within Iran
- Coordinates: 36°37′02″N 47°04′01″E
- Country: Iran
- Province: West Azerbaijan
- County: Takab
- District: Takht-e Soleyman
- Rural District: Ahmadabad

Population (2016)
  - Total: 693
- Time zone: UTC+3:30 (IRST)

Angurud (Persian: انگورود) (Note: Also romanized as Angūrūd; also known as Angūrd) is a village in Ahmadabad Rural District (Note: Formerly Takht-e Soleyman Rural District) of Takht-e Soleyman District in Takab County, West Azerbaijan province, Iran.

== Demographics ==
=== Population ===
At the time of the 2006 National Census, the village's population was 763 in 141 households. The following census in 2011 counted 772 people in 182 households. The 2016 census measured the population of the village as 693 people in 199 households.
