= Chowplu =

Village in West Azerbaijan province, Iran

Chowplu Persian: چوپلو
- Village
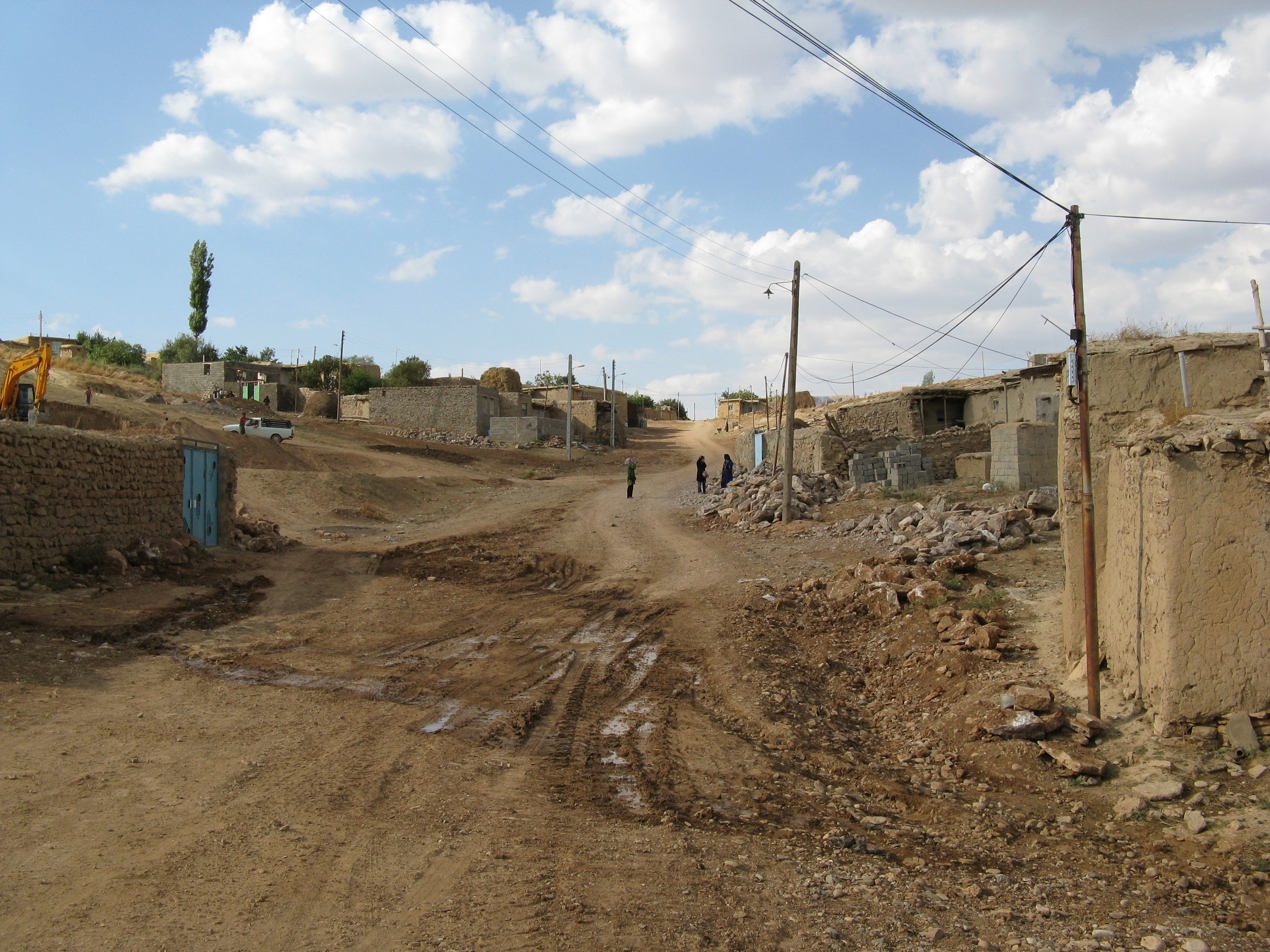
- The village of Chowplu

- Location within Iran
- Coordinates: 36°30′53″N 46°57′13″E
- Country: Iran
- Province: West Azerbaijan
- County: Takab
- District: Takht-e Soleyman
- Rural District: Saruq

Population (2016)
  - Total: 1,788
- Time zone: UTC+3:30 (IRST)

Chowplu (Persian: چوپلو) (Note: Also romanized as Chowplū; also known as Choplī and Choplū) is a village in, and the capital of, Saruq Rural District in Takht-e Soleyman District of Takab County, West Azerbaijan province, Iran.

== Demographics ==
=== Population ===
At the time of the 2006 National Census, the village's population was 1,871 in 368 households. The following census in 2011 counted 1,958 people in 480 households. The 2016 census measured the population of the village as 1,788 people in 492 households. It was the most populous village in its rural district.
