= Dash Qez Qapan =

Village in West Azerbaijan province, Iran

Dash Qez Qapan Persian: داش قزقاپان
- Village
- Location within Iran
- Coordinates: 36°36′21″N 46°58′59″E
- Country: Iran
- Province: West Azerbaijan
- County: Takab
- District: Takht-e Soleyman
- Rural District: Saruq

Population (2016)
  - Total: 1,245
- Time zone: UTC+3:30 (IRST)

Dash Qez Qapan (Persian: داش قزقاپان) (Note: Also romanized as Dāsh Qez Qāpān; also known as Dāsh Qīz Qāpān and Dāsh Qīzqāppān) is a village in Saruq Rural District of Takht-e Soleyman District in Takab County, West Azerbaijan province, Iran.

== Demographics ==
=== Population ===
At the time of the 2006 National Census, the village's population was 1,365 in 258 households. The following census in 2011 counted 1,344 people in 325 households. The 2016 census measured the population of the village as 1,245 people in 329 households.
