= Qarah Omar =

Village in West Azerbaijan province, Iran

Qarah Omar Persian: قره عمر
- Village
- Location within Iran
- Coordinates: 36°27′27″N 46°56′09″E
- Country: Iran
- Province: West Azerbaijan
- County: Takab
- District: Takht-e Soleyman
- Rural District: Saruq

Population (2016)
  - Total: 228
- Time zone: UTC+3:30 (IRST)

Qarah Omar (Persian: قره عمر) (Note: Also romanized as Qarah ‘Omar) is a village in Saruq Rural District of Takht-e Soleyman District in Takab County, West Azerbaijan province, Iran.

== Demographics ==
=== Population ===
At the time of the 2006 National Census, the village's population was 406 in 81 households. The following census in 2011 counted 340 people in 77 households. The 2016 census measured the population of the village as 228 people in 70 households.
