= Shir Mard, West Azerbaijan =

Village in West Azerbaijan province, Iran

Shir Mard Persian: شيرمرد
- Village
- Location within Iran
- Coordinates: 36°35′45″N 47°05′27″E
- Country: Iran
- Province: West Azerbaijan
- County: Takab
- District: Takht-e Soleyman
- Rural District: Ahmadabad

Population (2016)
  - Total: 470
- Time zone: UTC+3:30 (IRST)

Shir Mard (Persian: شيرمرد) (Note: Also romanized as Shīr Mard) is a village in Ahmadabad Rural District (Note: Formerly Takht-e Soleyman Rural District) of Takht-e Soleyman District in Takab County, West Azerbaijan province, Iran.

== Demographics ==
=== Population ===
At the time of the 2006 National Census, the village's population was 526 in 104 households. The following census in 2011 counted 443 people in 128 households. The 2016 census measured the population of the village as 470 people in 150 households.
