= Bash Barat =

Village in West Azerbaijan province, Iran

Bash Barat Persian: باش برات
- Village
- Location within Iran
- Coordinates: 36°30′17″N 47°00′39″E
- Country: Iran
- Province: West Azerbaijan
- County: Takab
- District: Takht-e Soleyman
- Rural District: Saruq

Population (2016)
  - Total: 328
- Time zone: UTC+3:30 (IRST)

Bash Barat (Persian: باش برات) (Note: Also romanized as Bāsh Barāt and Bāshbarāt) is a village in Saruq Rural District of Takht-e Soleyman District in Takab County, West Azerbaijan province, Iran.

== Demographics ==
=== Population ===
At the time of the 2006 National Census, the village's population was 426 in 80 households. The following census in 2011 counted 407 people in 78 households. The 2016 census measured the population of the village as 328 people in 98 households.
