= Cheragh Tappeh =

Cheragh Tappeh (Persian: چراغ تپه) may refer to:

- Cheragh Tappeh-ye Olya
- Cheragh Tappeh-ye Sofla
