= Takht-e Soleyman, Takab =

City in West Azerbaijan province, Iran

Takht-e Soleyman Persian: تخت سلیمان
- City
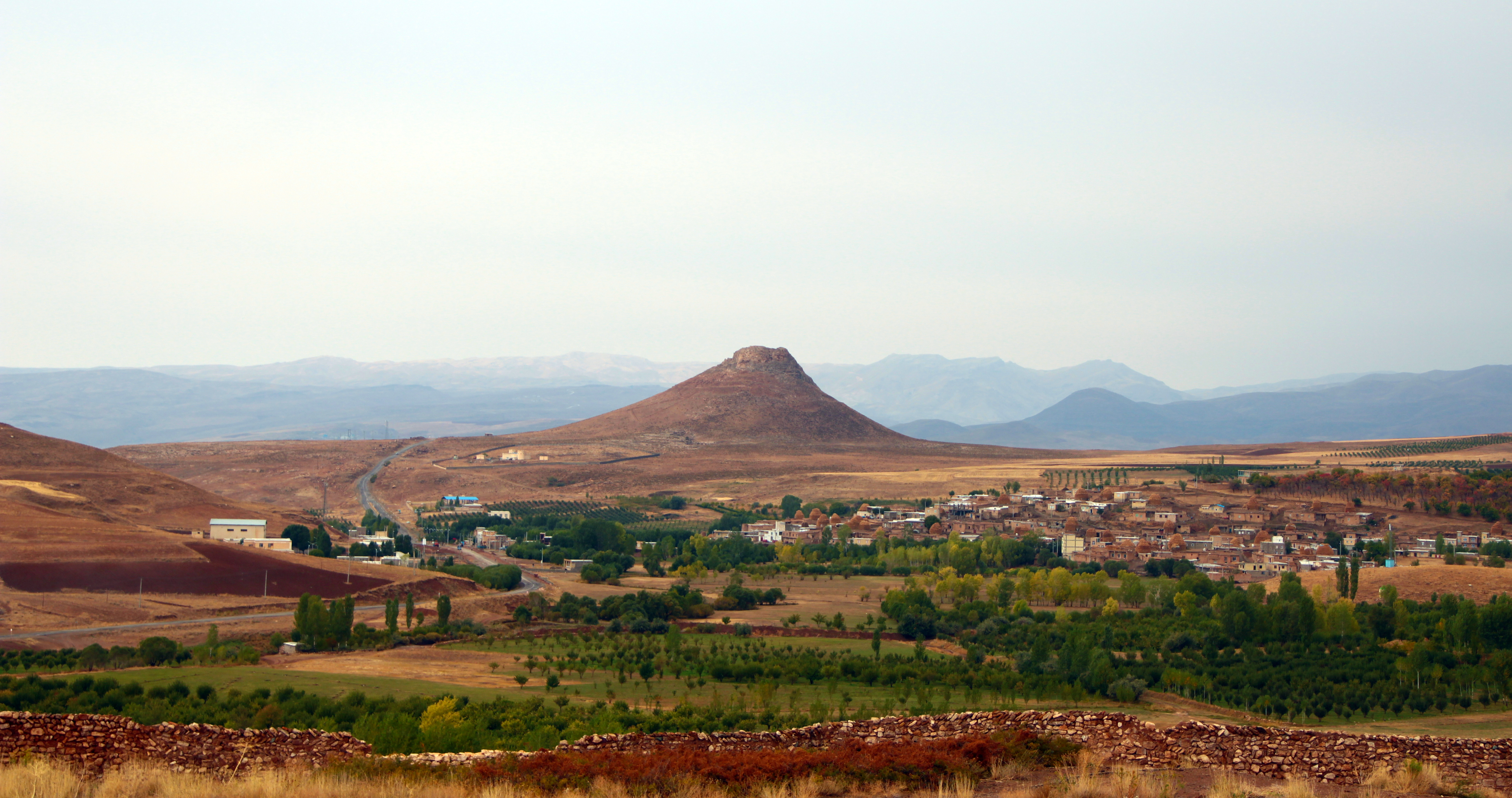

- Location within Iran
- Coordinates: 36°36′37″N 47°13′07″E
- Country: Iran
- Province: West Azerbaijan
- County: Takab
- District: Takht-e Soleyman
- Established as a city: 2020

Population (2016)
  - Total: 851
- Time zone: UTC+3:30 (IRST)

Takht-e Soleyman (Persian: تخت سلیمان) (Note: Formerly known as Tazeh Kand-e Nosratabad (تازه كندنصرت اباد), also romanized as Tāzeh Kand-e Noşratābād; also known as Noşratābād) is a city in, and the capital of, Takht-e Soleyman District in Takab County, West Azerbaijan province, Iran. It lies midway between the archaeological sites of Takht-e Soleyman and Zendan-e Soleyman.

== Demographics ==
=== Population ===
At the time of the 2006 National Census, Takht-e Soleyman's population (as the village of Tazeh Kand-e Nosratabad in Chaman Rural District) was 732 in 156 households. The following census in 2011 counted 980 people in 206 households. The 2016 census measured the population of the village as 851 people in 235 households. It was the most populous village in its rural district.

Tazeh Kand-e Nosratabad was converted to a city in 2020 and renamed Takht-e Soleyman in 2023.
