= Gonbad, Takab =

Village in West Azerbaijan province, Iran

Gonbad Persian: گنبد
- Village
- Location within Iran
- Coordinates: 36°33′34″N 47°15′00″E
- Country: Iran
- Province: West Azerbaijan
- County: Takab
- District: Takht-e Soleyman
- Rural District: Chaman

Population (2016)
  - Total: 129
- Time zone: UTC+3:30 (IRST)

Gonbad (Persian: گنبد) is a village in Chaman Rural District of Takht-e Soleyman District in Takab County, West Azerbaijan province, Iran.

== Demographics ==
=== Population ===
At the time of the 2006 National Census, the village's population was 170 in 37 households. The following census in 2011 counted 155 people in 37 households. The 2016 census measured the population of the village as 129 people in 35 households.
