= Baba Nazar, West Azerbaijan =

Village in West Azerbaijan province, Iran

Baba Nazar Persian: بابانظر
- Village
- Location within Iran
- Coordinates: 36°34′49″N 47°15′40″E
- Country: Iran
- Province: West Azerbaijan
- County: Takab
- District: Takht-e Soleyman
- Rural District: Chaman

Population (2016)
  - Total: 486
- Time zone: UTC+3:30 (IRST)

Baba Nazar (Persian: بابانظر) (Note: Also romanized as Bābā Naz̧ar; also known as Bābā Nazar) is a village in Chaman Rural District of Takht-e Soleyman District in Takab County, West Azerbaijan province, Iran.

== Demographics ==
=== Population ===
At the time of the 2006 National Census, the village's population was 679 in 146 households. The following census in 2011 counted 613 people in 162 households. The 2016 census measured the population of the village as 486 people in 173 households.
