= Gugerdchi =

Village in West Azerbaijan province, Iran

Gugerdchi Persian: گوگردچي
- Village
- Location within Iran
- Coordinates: 36°31′30″N 47°07′59″E
- Country: Iran
- Province: West Azerbaijan
- County: Takab
- District: Takht-e Soleyman
- Rural District: Chaman

Population (2016)
  - Total: 114
- Time zone: UTC+3:30 (IRST)

Gugerdchi (Persian: گوگردچي) (Note: Also romanized as Gūgerdchī) is a village in Chaman Rural District of Takht-e Soleyman District in Takab County, West Azerbaijan province, Iran.

== Demographics ==
=== Population ===
At the time of the 2006 National Census, the village's population was 191 in 50 households. The following census in 2011 counted 166 people in 39 households. The 2016 census measured the population of the village as 114 people in 36 households.
