= Ahmadabad-e Sofla, West Azerbaijan =

Village in West Azerbaijan province, Iran

Ahmadabad-e Sofla Persian: احمداباد سفلي
- Village
- Location within Iran
- Coordinates: 36°36′42″N 47°08′51″E
- Country: Iran
- Province: West Azerbaijan
- County: Takab
- District: Takht-e Soleyman
- Rural District: Ahmadabad

Population (2016)
  - Total: 2,046
- Time zone: UTC+3:30 (IRST)

Ahmadabad-e Sofla (Persian: احمداباد سفلي) (Note: Also romanized as Aḩmadābād-e Soflá; also known as Aḩmadābād and Aḩmadābād-e Pā’īn) is a village in, and the capital of, Ahmadabad Rural District (Note: Formerly Takht-e Soleyman Rural District) in Takht-e Soleyman District of Takab County, West Azerbaijan province, Iran.

== Demographics ==
=== Population ===
At the time of the 2006 National Census, the village's population was 1,890 in 395 households. The following census in 2011 counted 2,010 people in 496 households. The 2016 census measured the population of the village as 2,046 people in 624 households. It was the most populous village in its rural district.
