= Nabi Kandi, Takab =

Village in West Azerbaijan province, Iran

Nabi Kandi Persian: نبي كندي
- Village
- Location within Iran
- Coordinates: 36°33′20″N 47°00′53″E
- Country: Iran
- Province: West Azerbaijan
- County: Takab
- District: Takht-e Soleyman
- Rural District: Saruq

Population (2016)
  - Total: 1,206
- Time zone: UTC+3:30 (IRST)

Nabi Kandi (Persian: نبي كندي) (Note: Also romanized as Nabī Kandī; also known as Benī Kandī and Nabi Kand) is a village in Saruq Rural District of Takht-e Soleyman District in Takab County, West Azerbaijan province, Iran.

== Demographics ==
=== Population ===
At the time of the 2006 National Census, the village's population was 1,383 in 245 households. The following census in 2011 counted 1,322 people in 328 households. The 2016 census measured the population of the village as 1,206 people in 333 households.
