= Qinarjeh, Takab =

Village in West Azerbaijan province, Iran

Qinarjeh Persian: قينرجه
- Village
- Location within Iran
- Coordinates: 36°41′37″N 47°12′25″E
- Country: Iran
- Province: West Azerbaijan
- County: Takab
- District: Takht-e Soleyman
- Rural District: Ahmadabad

Population (2016)
  - Total: 854
- Time zone: UTC+3:30 (IRST)

Qinarjeh (Persian: قينرجه) (Note: Also romanized as Qeynarjeh and Qīnarjeh) is a village in Ahmadabad Rural District (Note: Formerly Takht-e Soleyman Rural District) of Takht-e Soleyman District in Takab County, West Azerbaijan province, Iran.

== Demographics ==
=== Population ===
At the time of the 2006 National Census, the village's population was 907 in 201 households. The following census in 2011 counted 825 people in 243 households. The 2016 census measured the population of the village as 854 people in 282 households.
