= Kharkhar =

Kharkhar may refer to:

- Xarxar, Azerbaijan
- Kharkhar, Iran
- Kharkhar, Markazi, Iran
