= Qaravolkhaneh =

Village in West Azerbaijan province, Iran

Qaravolkhaneh Persian: قراولخانه
- Village
- Location within Iran
- Coordinates: 36°36′47″N 47°18′53″E
- Country: Iran
- Province: West Azerbaijan
- County: Takab
- District: Takht-e Soleyman
- Rural District: Chaman

Population (2016)
  - Total: 112
- Time zone: UTC+3:30 (IRST)

Qaravolkhaneh (Persian: قراولخانه) (Note: Also romanized as Qarāvol Khāneh and Qarāvolkhāneh) is a village in Chaman Rural District of Takht-e Soleyman District in Takab County, West Azerbaijan province, Iran.

== Demographics ==
=== Population ===
At the time of the 2006 National Census, the village's population was 181 in 39 households. The following census in 2011 counted 137 people in 32 households. The 2016 census measured the population of the village as 112 people in 37 households.
