= Jedaqayah, West Azerbaijan =

Jedaqayah جداقيه
- Village
- Location within Iran
- Coordinates: 36°48′43″N 47°04′50″E
- Country: Iran
- Province: West Azerbaijan
- County: Takab
- Bakhsh: Takht-e Soleyman
- Rural District: Ahmadabad

Population (2006)
  - Total: 189
- Time zone: UTC+3:30 (IRST)
  - Summer (DST): UTC+4:30 (IRDT)

Jedaqayah (Persian: جداقيه, also Romanized as Jedāqayah and Jedāqayeh) is a village in Ahmadabad Rural District, Takht-e Soleyman District, Takab County, West Azerbaijan Province, Iran. At the 2006 census, its population was 189, in 37 families.
