= Cheragh Tappeh-ye Sofla =

Village in West Azerbaijan province, Iran

Cheragh Tappeh-ye Sofla Persian: چراغ تپه سفلي
- Village
- Location within Iran
- Coordinates: 36°38′57″N 47°10′06″E
- Country: Iran
- Province: West Azerbaijan
- County: Takab
- District: Takht-e Soleyman
- Rural District: Ahmadabad

Population (2016)
  - Total: 552
- Time zone: UTC+3:30 (IRST)

Cheragh Tappeh-ye Sofla (Persian: چراغ تپه سفلي) (Note: Also romanized as Cherāgh Tappeh-ye Soflá) is a village in Ahmadabad Rural District (Note: Formerly Takht-e Soleyman Rural District) of Takht-e Soleyman District in Takab County, West Azerbaijan province, Iran.

== Demographics ==
=== Population ===
At the time of the 2006 National Census, the village's population was 648 in 134 households. The following census in 2011 counted 571 people in 151 households. The 2016 census measured the population of the village as 522 people in 173 households.
