= Aqdarreh-ye Vosta =

Village in West Azerbaijan province, Iran

Aqdarreh-ye Vosta Persian: اقدره وسطي
- Village
- Location within Iran
- Coordinates: 36°40′34″N 47°02′51″E
- Country: Iran
- Province: West Azerbaijan
- County: Takab
- District: Takht-e Soleyman
- Rural District: Ahmadabad

Population (2016)
  - Total: 320
- Time zone: UTC+3:30 (IRST)

Aqdarreh-ye Vosta (Persian: اقدره وسطي) (Note: Also romanized as Āqdarreh-ye Vosţá; also known as Āgh Darreh-ye Vosţá) is a village in Ahmadabad Rural District (Note: Formerly Takht-e Soleyman Rural District) of Takht-e Soleyman District in Takab County, West Azerbaijan province, Iran.

== Demographics ==
=== Population ===
At the time of the 2006 National Census, the village's population was 350 in 67 households. The following census in 2011 counted a population below the reporting threshold. The 2016 census measured the population of the village as 320 people in 87 households.
