= Alucheluy-e Sofla =

Village in West Azerbaijan province, Iran

Alucheluy-e Sofla Persian: الوچلوي سفلي
- Village
- Location within Iran
- Coordinates: 36°40′11″N 47°06′41″E
- Country: Iran
- Province: West Azerbaijan
- County: Takab
- District: Takht-e Soleyman
- Rural District: Ahmadabad

Population (2016)
  - Total: 514
- Time zone: UTC+3:30 (IRST)

Alucheluy-e Sofla (Persian: الوچلوي سفلي) (Note: Also romanized as Ālūchelūy-e Soflá; also known as Ālūchehlū-ye Soflá (الوچهلو سفلي) and Aluchehluy-e Sofla (الوچهلوي سفلي), also romanized as Ālūchehlūy-e Soflá) is a village in Ahmadabad Rural District (Note: Formerly Takht-e Soleyman Rural District) of Takht-e Soleyman District in Takab County, West Azerbaijan province, Iran.

== Demographics ==
=== Population ===
At the time of the 2006 National Census, the village's population was 487 in 94 households. The following census in 2011 counted 427 people in 103 households. The 2016 census measured the population of the village as 514 people in 143 households.
