= Qushkhaneh =

Qushkhaneh (Persian: قوشخانه) may refer to:

- Qushkhaneh, Faruj, a village in North Khorasan province
- Qushkhaneh District, an administrative division in North Khorasan province
- Qushkhaneh-ye Bala Rural District, an administrative division in North Khorasan province
- Qushkhaneh-ye Pain Rural District, an administrative division in North Khorasan province
- Qushkhaneh-ye Olya, a village in West Azerbaijan province
