= Aqdarreh-ye Sofla =

Village in West Azerbaijan province, Iran

Aqdarreh-ye Sofla Persian: اقدره سفلي
- Village
- Location within Iran
- Coordinates: 36°38′51″N 47°04′31″E
- Country: Iran
- Province: West Azerbaijan
- County: Takab
- District: Takht-e Soleyman
- Rural District: Ahmadabad

Population (2016)
  - Total: 110
- Time zone: UTC+3:30 (IRST)

Aqdarreh-ye Sofla (Persian: اقدره سفلي) (Note: Also romanized as Āqdarreh-ye Soflá; also known as Āgh Darreh-ye Soflá) is a village in Ahmadabad Rural District (Note: Formerly Takht-e Soleyman Rural District) of Takht-e Soleyman District in Takab County, West Azerbaijan province, Iran.

== Demographics ==
=== Population ===
At the time of the 2006 National Census, the village's population was 147 in 25 households. The following census in 2011 counted 449 people in 103 households. The 2016 census measured the population of the village as 110 people in 25 households.
