= Aqdarreh-ye Olya =

Village in West Azerbaijan province, Iran

Aqdarreh-ye Olya Persian: اقدره عليا
- Village
- Location within Iran
- Coordinates: 36°40′56″N 47°00′41″E
- Country: Iran
- Province: West Azerbaijan
- County: Takab
- District: Takht-e Soleyman
- Rural District: Ahmadabad

Population (2016)
  - Total: 731
- Time zone: UTC+3:30 (IRST)

Aqdarreh-ye Olya (Persian: اقدره عليا) (Note: Also romanized as Āqdarreh-ye ‘Olyā; also known as Āgh Darreh-ye ‘Olyā) is a village in Ahmadabad Rural District (Note: Formerly Takht-e Soleyman Rural District) of Takht-e Soleyman District in Takab County, West Azerbaijan province, Iran.

== Demographics ==
=== Population ===
At the time of the 2006 National Census, the village's population was 629 in 119 households. The following census in 2011 counted 614 people in 150 households. The 2016 census measured the population of the village as 731 people in 208 households.
