= Qushkhaneh-ye Olya =

Qushkhaneh-ye Olya قوشخانه عليا
- Village
- Location within Iran
- Coordinates: 36°30′06″N 47°18′54″E
- Country: Iran
- Province: West Azerbaijan
- County: Tikan təpə
- Bakhsh: Takht-e Soleyman
- Rural District: Chaman

Population (2006)
  - Total: 21
- Time zone: UTC+3:30 (IRST)
  - Summer (DST): UTC+4:30 (IRDT)

Qushkhaneh-ye Olya (Turkish: قوشخانه عليا, also Romanized as Qūshkhāneh-ye ‘Olyā) is a village in Chaman Rural District, Takht-e Soleyman District, Tikan təpə County, West Azerbaijan Province, Iran. At the 2006 census, its population was 21, in 5 families.
