= Cheragh Tappeh-ye Olya =

Cheragh Tappeh-ye Olya چراغ تپه عليا
- Village
- Location within Iran
- Coordinates: 36°39′49″N 47°10′52″E
- Country: Iran
- Province: West Azerbaijan
- County: Takab
- Bakhsh: Takht-e Soleyman
- Rural District: Ahmadabad

Population (2006)
  - Total: 101
- Time zone: UTC+3:30 (IRST)
  - Summer (DST): UTC+4:30 (IRDT)

Cheragh Tappeh-ye Olya (Persian: چراغ تپه عليا, also Romanized as Cherāgh Tappeh-ye 'Olyā) is a village in Ahmadabad Rural District, Takht-e Soleyman District, Takab County, West Azerbaijan province, Iran. At the 2006 census, its population was 101, in 21 families.
