= Alucheluy-e Olya =

Village in West Azerbaijan province, Iran

Alucheluy-e Olya Persian: الوچلوي عليا
- Village
- Location within Iran
- Coordinates: 36°40′50″N 47°06′38″E
- Country: Iran
- Province: West Azerbaijan
- County: Takab
- District: Takht-e Soleyman
- Rural District: Ahmadabad

Population (2016)
  - Total: 108
- Time zone: UTC+3:30 (IRST)

Alucheluy-e Olya (Persian: الوچلوي عليا) (Note: Also romanized as Ālūchelūy-e ‘Olyā; also known as Ālūchehlū-ye ‘Olyā (الوچهلو عليا) and Aluchehluy-e ‘Olyā (الوچهلوي عليا), also romanized as Ālūchehlūy-e ‘Olyā) is a village in Ahmadabad Rural District (Note: Formerly Takht-e Soleyman Rural District) of Takht-e Soleyman District in Takab County, West Azerbaijan province, Iran.

== Demographics ==
=== Population ===
At the time of the 2006 National Census, the village's population was 116 in 20 households. The following census in 2011 counted 118 people in 26 households. The 2016 census measured the population of the village as 108 people in 33 households.
