= Hampa, West Azerbaijan =

Village in West Azerbaijan province, Iran

Hampa Persian: همپا
- Village
- Location within Iran
- Coordinates: 36°32′59″N 47°15′38″E
- Country: Iran
- Province: West Azerbaijan
- County: Takab
- District: Takht-e Soleyman
- Rural District: Chaman

Population (2016)
  - Total: 328
- Time zone: UTC+3:30 (IRST)

Hampa (Persian: همپا) (Note: Also romanized as Hampā and Hompā) is a village in Chaman Rural District of Takht-e Soleyman District in Takab County, West Azerbaijan province, Iran.

== Demographics ==
=== Ethnicity ===
Hampa is populated by Azerbaijani Turks.

=== Population ===
At the time of the 2006 National Census, the village's population was 384 in 88 households. The following census in 2011 counted 374 people in 87 households. The 2016 census measured the population of the village as 328 people in 103 households.
