= Agh Darreh =

Agh Darreh اغ دره
- Village
- Location within Iran
- Coordinates: 38°40′40″N 47°24′17″E
- Country: Iran
- Province: East Azerbaijan
- County: Ahar
- Bakhsh: Hurand
- Rural District: Dikleh

Population (2006)
  - Total: 17
- Time zone: UTC+3:30 (IRST)
  - Summer (DST): UTC+4:30 (IRDT)

Agh Darreh (Persian: اغ دره, also Romanized as Āgh Darreh; also known as Āq Darreh) is a village in Dikleh Rural District, Hurand District, Ahar County, East Azerbaijan Province, Iran. At the 2006 census, its population was 17, in 5 families.
