= Aqdaraq-e Qadim =

Aqdaraq-e Qadim اق درق قديم
- Village
- Location within Iran
- Coordinates: 38°37′43″N 47°08′53″E
- Country: Iran
- Province: East Azerbaijan
- County: Kaleybar
- Bakhsh: Central
- Rural District: Peyghan Chayi

Population (2006)
  - Total: 128
- Time zone: UTC+3:30 (IRST)
  - Summer (DST): UTC+4:30 (IRDT)

Aqdaraq-e Qadim (Persian: اق درق قديم, also Romanized as Āqdaraq-e Qadīm; also known as Āgh Daraq-e Qadīm) is a village in Peyghan Chayi Rural District, in the Central District of Kaleybar County, East Azerbaijan Province, Iran. At the 2006 census, its population was 128, in 24 families.
