= Hampa, East Azerbaijan =

Hampa همپا
- Village
- Location within Iran
- Coordinates: 37°33′24″N 47°49′31″E
- Country: Iran
- Province: East Azerbaijan
- County: Meyaneh
- Bakhsh: Central
- Rural District: Garmeh-ye Jonubi

Population (2006)
  - Total: 105
- Time zone: UTC+3:30 (IRST)
  - Summer (DST): UTC+4:30 (IRDT)

Hampa (Persian: همپا, also Romanized as Hampā) is a village in Garmeh-ye Jonubi Rural District, in the Central District of Meyaneh County, East Azerbaijan Province, Iran. At the 2006 census, its population was 105, in 32 families.
