= Xarxar =

- Municipality
- Location within Azerbaijan
- Coordinates: 40°42′21″N 45°49′50″E
- Country: Azerbaijan
- Rayon: Gadabay

Population
  - Total: 1,550
- Time zone: UTC+4 (AZT)
  - Summer (DST): UTC+5 (AZT)

Xarxar (also, Xar-xar and Kharkhar) is a village and municipality in the Gadabay Rayon of Azerbaijan. It has a population of 1,550.
