= Jodaqayeh, East Azerbaijan =

Jodaqayeh جداقيه
- Village
- Location within Iran
- Coordinates: 37°37′23″N 47°08′10″E
- Country: Iran
- Province: East Azerbaijan
- County: Bostanabad
- Bakhsh: Tekmeh Dash
- Rural District: Abbas-e Sharqi

Population (2006)
  - Total: 49
- Time zone: UTC+3:30 (IRST)
  - Summer (DST): UTC+4:30 (IRDT)

Jodaqayeh (Persian: جداقيه, also Romanized as Jodāqayeh) is a village in Abbas-e Sharqi Rural District, Tekmeh Dash District, Bostanabad County, East Azerbaijan Province, Iran. At the 2006 census, its population was 49, in 12 families.
