= Jodaqayah =

Jodaqayah جداقايه
- Village
- Location within Iran
- Coordinates: 35°10′08″N 48°02′24″E
- Country: Iran
- Province: Kurdistan
- County: Qorveh
- Bakhsh: Chaharduli
- Rural District: Chaharduli-ye Sharqi

Population (2006)
  - Total: 207
- Time zone: UTC+3:30 (IRST)
  - Summer (DST): UTC+4:30 (IRDT)

Jodaqayah (Persian: جداقايه, also Romanized as Jodāqāyah, Jodāqayah, Jodā Qāyeh, and Jedāqayeh; also known as Jidāqiyeh, Joda Ghayeh, and Jodā Qeyeh) is a village in Chaharduli-ye Sharqi Rural District, Chaharduli District, Qorveh County, Kurdistan Province, Iran. At the 2006 census, its population was 207, in 51 families. The village is populated by Kurds.
