= Prison of Solomon =

Mountain in West Azerbaijan Province, Iran

Coordinates: 36°36′52″N 47°12′05″E

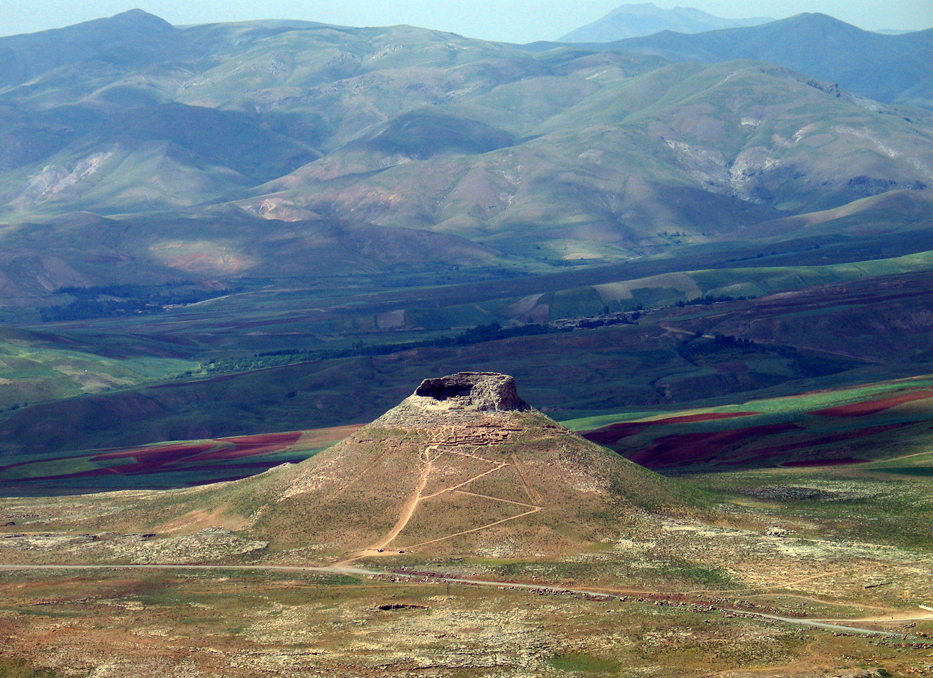

Highest point
- Elevation: 2,254 m (7,395 ft)
- Prominence: 97–107 meters

Naming
- Native name: زندان سلیمان (Persian)

Geography
- Location: West Azerbaijan, Iran

The Prison of Solomon (Persian: زندان سلیمان, romanized: Zendān-e Soleymān) is a hollow cone shaped hill in West Azerbaijan province, Iran. There is an 80 meters deep pit in the middle of the hill, and the entrance to the pit is roughly 65 meters in diameter.

== Name ==
Its current name "Prison of Solomon" was given to it by locals who think it is the place Solomon kept demons prisoner.

== History ==
The hill is the result of an Artesian spring first creating a small pond. Lime and other minerals then slowly sedimented around the pond and created a wall. Over ages, this wall became taller and taller as the water overflew from the existing wall and sedimented even more which led to the structure we have today. The spring then dried, leaving a hollow hill behind.

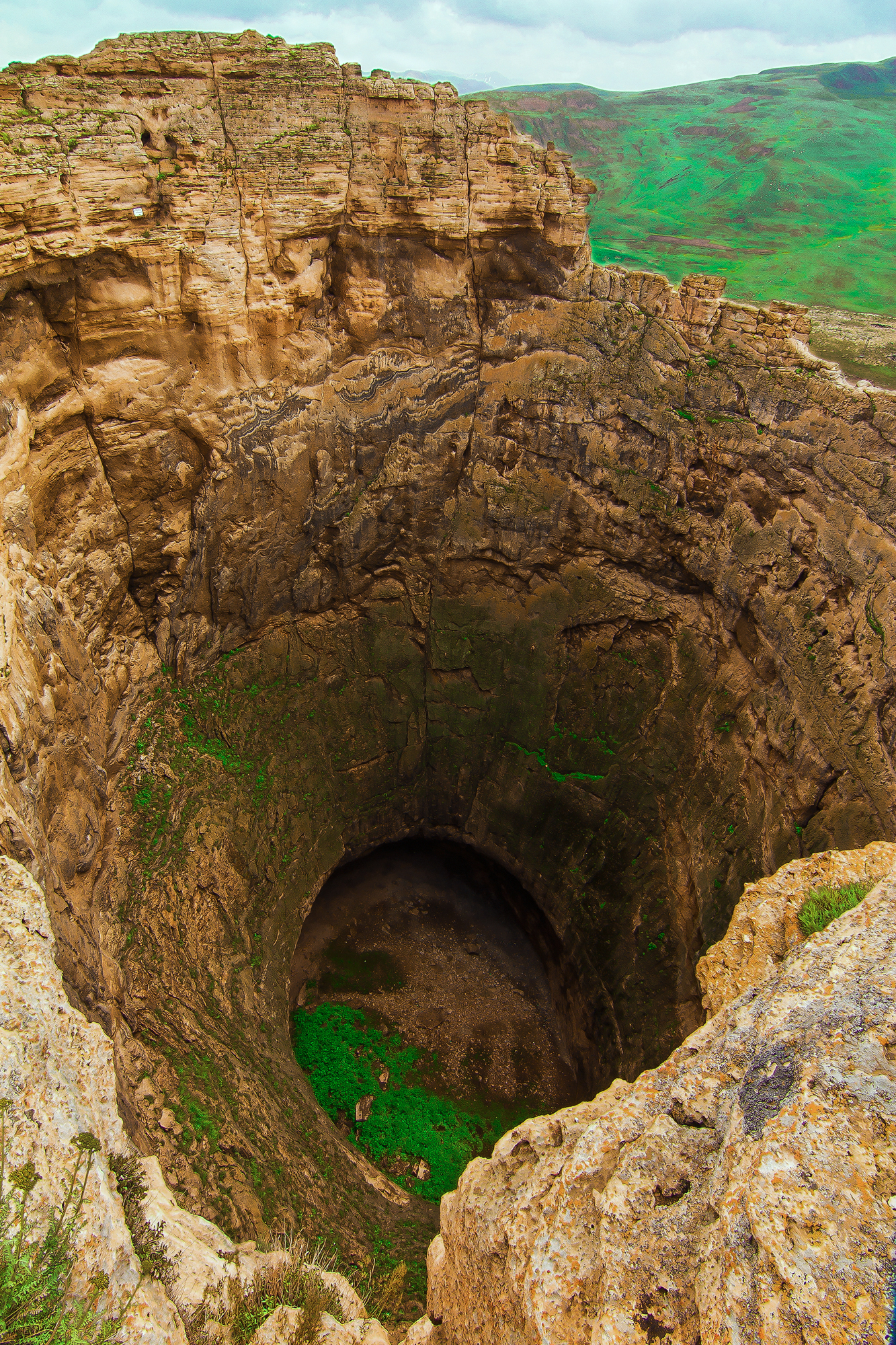
Inside the pit

Located 3 kilometers west of Takht-e Soleymān, the place has been subject to many religious and cultural practices through ages. It used to be surrounded by walls and hosted a Mannaean temple in 880–660 BCE. However it did not reach its greatest religious importance until early 5th century CE when Takht-e Soleyman was established nearby as an important Zoroastrian temple.

== National heritage site ==
It was listed among the national heritage sites of Iran on 15 March 2001 with the number 3257.

== See also ==
- Takht-e Soleyman
- Tangeh Soleyman
- Danial Cave (Persian Wikipedia)
