= Qaleh-ye Aqdarreh =

Qaleh-ye Aqdarreh قلعه اقدره
- Village
- Location within Iran
- Coordinates: 34°59′10″N 50°09′28″E
- Country: Iran
- Province: Markazi
- County: Saveh
- Bakhsh: Central
- Rural District: Shahsavan Kandi

Population (2006)
  - Total: 15
- Time zone: UTC+3:30 (IRST)
  - Summer (DST): UTC+4:30 (IRDT)

Qaleh-ye Aqdarreh (Persian: قلعه اقدره, also Romanized as Qal‘eh-ye Āqdarreh; also known as Āqdarreh and Aqdarreh) is a village in Shahsavan Kandi Rural District, in the Central District of Saveh County, Markazi Province, Iran. At the 2006 census, its population was 15, in 12 families.
