= Aq Darreh, East Azerbaijan =

Aq Darreh اقدره
- Village
- Location within Iran
- Coordinates: 37°34′27″N 46°44′03″E
- Country: Iran
- Province: East Azerbaijan
- County: Bostanabad
- Bakhsh: Tekmeh Dash
- Rural District: Sahandabad

Population (2006)
  - Total: 64
- Time zone: UTC+3:30 (IRST)
  - Summer (DST): UTC+4:30 (IRDT)

Aq Darreh (Persian: اقدره, also Romanized as Āq Darreh; also known as Āgh Darreh and Āqdaraq) is a village in Sahandabad Rural District, Tekmeh Dash District, Bostanabad County, East Azerbaijan Province, Iran. At the 2006 census, its population was 64, in 15 families.
