= Chaman Rural District =

Rural district in West Azerbaijan province, Iran

Chaman Rural District Persian: دهستان چمن
- Rural District
- Location within Iran
- Coordinates: 36°35′N 47°17′E
- Country: Iran
- Province: West Azerbaijan
- County: Takab
- District: Takht-e Soleyman
- Established: 1990
- Capital: Qarah Bolagh

Population (2016)
  - Total: 2,650
- Time zone: UTC+3:30 (IRST)

Chaman Rural District (Persian: دهستان چمن) is in Takht-e Soleyman District of Takab County, West Azerbaijan province, Iran. Its capital is the village of Qarah Bolagh.

== Demographics ==
=== Population ===
At the time of the 2006 National Census, the rural district's population was 3,410 in 744 households. There were 3,325 inhabitants in 796 households at the following census of 2011. The 2016 census measured the population of the rural district as 2,650 in 835 households. The most populous of its 21 villages was Tazeh Kand-e Nosratabad (now the city of Takht-e Soleyman) with 851 people.

=== Other villages in the rural district ===
- Aghbolagh-e Olya
- Baba Nazar
- Gonbad
- Gugerdchi
- Hampa
- Qaravolkhaneh
- Qusha Bolagh
