= Takht-e Soleymān =

Archaeological site in West Azerbaijan, Iran

- تخت سلیمان (Persian)
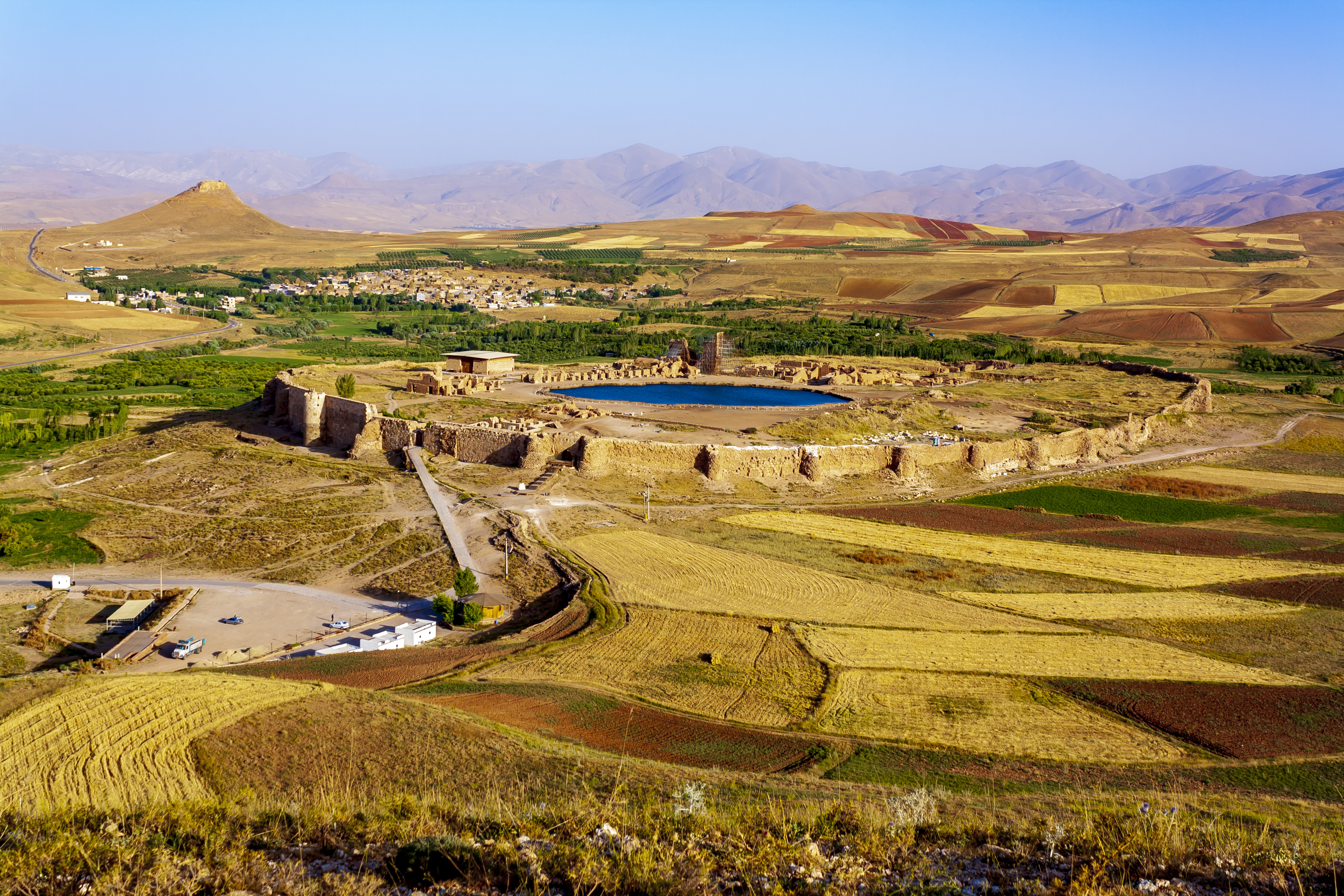
- Takht-e Soleymān

- Location within Iran
- 36.603171°N 47.235949°E
- Type: Settlement
- Location: West Azerbaijan, Iran

UNESCO World Heritage Site
- Official name: Takht-e Soleyman
- Type: Cultural
- Criteria: i, ii, iii, iv, vi
- Designated: 2003 (27th session)
- Reference no.: 1077
- Region: Asia-Pacific

Iran National Heritage List
- Official name: Takht-e-Soleyman
- Type: Ruins
- Designated: 1938
- Reference no.: 308
- Conservation organization: Cultural Heritage, Handicrafts and Tourism Organization of Iran

Takht-e Soleymān (Persian: تخت سلیمان, lit. 'Throne of Solomon') is an archaeological site in West Azerbaijan, Iran dating back to the Sasanian Empire. It lies midway between Urmia and Hamadan, very near the present-day town of Takab, and 400 km (250 mi) west of Tehran.

The fortified site, which is located on a hill created by the outflow of a calcium-rich spring pond, was recognized as a World Heritage Site in July 2003. The citadel includes the remains of Adur Gushnasp, a Zoroastrian fire temple built during the Sasanian era and partially rebuilt (as a mosque) under the Ilkhanate. This temple housed one of the three "Great Fires" or "Royal Fires" that Sassanid rulers humbled themselves before in order to ascend the throne. The fire at Takht-i Soleiman was called Adur Gushnasp and was dedicated to the arteshtar or the warrior class of the Sassanid. The foundations of the fire temple around the pond is attributed to that legend. Takht-e Soleyman appears on the 4th century Peutinger Map.

This site got its biblical name after the Muslim conquest of Persia in the 7th century. Folk legend relates that King Solomon used to imprison monsters inside a nearby 100m deep crater which is called Zendan-e Soleyman "Prison of Solomon". Solomon is also said to have created the flowing pond in the fortress.

Archaeological excavations have revealed traces of a 5th-century BC occupation during the Achaemenid era, as well as later Parthian settlements in the citadel. Coins belonging to the reign of Sassanid shahs, and that of the Byzantine emperor Theodosius II (AD 408–450), have also been discovered there.

There is a small museum exhibiting artifacts from the site.

== Ilkhanid period of Takht-e Soleyman ==
Situated in the province of Azerbaijan of northwestern Iran, the remains of the Takht-e Soleyman complex can be found upon a grassy plain, surrounded by a volcanic mountain region. Meaning “the Throne of Solomon” in Persian, Sughurlukh in Turkish, translating to “a place abounding in marmots”, Takht-e Soleyman was built in the thirteenth century under the Ilkhanid dynasty as a summer and hunting palace. Beforehand, the site was a Zoroastrian fire temple, which was the state religion of the Sasanian dynasty, which they built during the fifth century. The Ilkhanid patron, Abaqa Khan (r.1265-82), the second Ilkhan ruler and son of Hülagü, the first ruler of the Ilkhanid dynasty, chose this site for his summer residence partly because of the massive ruins remaining of the old fire temple and Sasanian palace. He could create his complex using the ancient layout and general direction to help dictate his own architectural plan. Choosing this historic site in Iran also legitimized their presence within previous Iranian culture. The Ilkhanids wanted to integrate themselves into the historical Iranian fabric, hence them using the pre-existing and pre-Islamic Sasanian structure to build their own post-Islamic and Mongol inspired complex.

=== Context ===
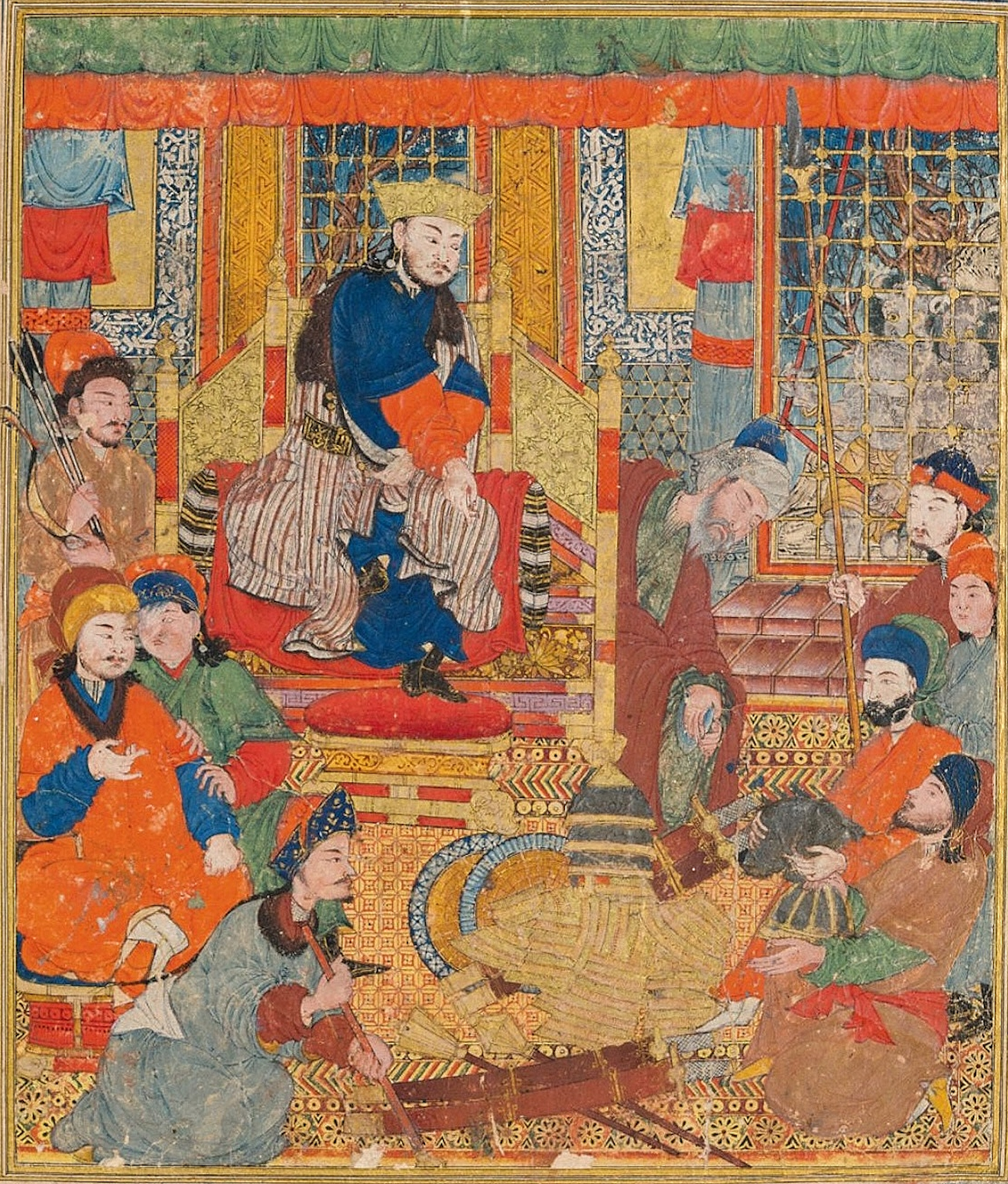
Contemporary depiction of the Il-Khanid court, in a scene of the Great Mongol Shahnamah. Tabriz or Baghdad, 1325-1335. Possibly intended to show Abaqa Khan at the Il-Khanid palace of Takht-e Soleyman.

The complex was created during the early phase of the Ilkhanid empire, and was a synthesis of Iranian and Central/Eastern Asian traditions. During the reign of Hülagü, the Ilkhanids experienced great success in continuously conquering lands, so the province of Azerbaijan in Iran and three Iranian cities nearby (Tabriz, Maragha, and Khoi), as well as an ordū (royal encampment) on the Jaghatu river, became the political headquarters for the dynasty now in Iran. This was partially due to the natural advantages of the landscape, with high mountains that sloped to lowland plains, a warm climate around Lake Urmia (the large body of water in the proximity of the complex), and lush, fertile grounds for ideal agriculture. The Ilkhanids were originally used to a nomadic Mongol lifestyle, living in tent encampments as their proper residences. Therefore, families could easily flock to this livable, fertile and safe land to set up their tents. However, now in Iranian land and upon new cultural and architectural influences, Ilkhanid nobility built Takht-e Soleyman, actually settling into the land and incorporating both nomadic and sedentary architecture. Also, Hülagü was focused on conquering Syria and Egypt, so his son wanted to continue his original plan after his father's death. The construction of this site began soon after Abaqa's accession, possibly beginning in 1271, and he decided to stay close to the dynasty's current main headquarters in northwestern Iran, close to Syria and Egypt. Overall, he built this magnificent summer resort for himself, those in the Ilkhanid court living in the nearby city of Maragha and in the Jaghatū ordū. In the end, the site of Takht-e Soleyman was extremely beneficial due to historical, geographical, social, and political reasons.

=== Influences ===
The Ilkhanids were not originally an Islamic dynasty, but as they settled into the Iranian lands and established a new kingdom, they needed to adapt. They converted to the main religion of their new territory, and intertwined the established art and architectural traditions of their new home with the traditions of Mongols and those from Eastern Asia. They combined temporary and permanent architecture together, which is evident at Takht-e Soleyman, the only surviving secular structure of the Ilkhanid period. This complex has the tangible ability to show the connection between China and Iran through the layout and decorations. There were polygonal shaped tower structures said to be based on the shape of Mongol tents. There are Chinese motifs such as dragons and phoenix found on rectangular tiles from Takht-e Soleyman, showing the transmission of cultural motifs deliberately chosen by the Ilkhanids. The plan itself is reminiscent of the Mongol headquarters in China, which was inspired by a traditional Chinese city plan, as well as a classic Mongol nomadic camp. This links the Ilkhanid empire to great and powerful dynasties from the East, in a line of dynastic artistic traditions. The activities within Takht-e Soleyman are also similar to those in the pleasure palaces of those in China, where there was plenty room for hunting within the structure's walls, and there was a lake on the palace grounds. The Ilkhanids also conducted administrative and courtly duties within this summer outpost, with many trials, appointments with foreign rulers and courts, celebrations, and enthronements. It was a place for the elite to get away from the busier cities and the wars, a place for retreat filled with colorful decorations, luxuries for the Ilkhanid court and soldiers, and a place for important activities to be fulfilled.

=== The complex ===
Takht-e Soleyman, constructed by Ilkhanid ruler Abaqa and later completed by his son Arghun, is an Ilkhanid summer palace situated directly on top of the ruins of the Sasanian sanctuary. The palace is oriented cardinally as in Mongol tradition with the entire complex being surrounded by a fortified ovular wall. Within this wall, the complex consists of a large courtyard with an artificial lake at its center. The entire courtyard is framed by porticoes, four iwan complexes in each cardinal direction, and “several polygonal structures”. Two large rectangular halls are placed in front of the south iwan and connect the surrounding ovular wall with the porticoed courtyard of the palace proper. An audience hall with a large dome is located behind the north iwan on the location of what was the Sasanian fire temple. While the north and south iwans are centered on porticoed walls of the complex, the east and west iwans are placed on the northern edges. The hall behind the west iwan stands between two polygonal structures, specifically octagonal chambers to the south and north of the iwan, which served as the throne room and later as a residence for the Ilkhanid ruler. Plaster remnants on the floor within the west iwan provide evidence that the dome of the southern chamber room was elaborately decorated with muqarnas. The walls of the palace, but specifically the northern chamber attached to the west iwan, were decorated with painted stucco on the upper sections and on the lower sections, the dado, with elaborate luster tiles in the lajvardina technique. These tiled designs consisted mostly of stars and similar geometric shapes and also included heroic figural imagery. There were also friezes across many walls with similar geometric and figural designs in addition to inscriptions. The muqarnas and luster tiles, as well as the painted stucco walls, all demonstrate the importance of lavish decoration of Ilkhanid architecture, especially with palatial structures. Furthermore, Takht-e Soleyman demonstrates the importance the Ilkhanids placed on secular architecture.

=== Muqarnas ceiling ===
Excavated from under the ruins of Takht-e Soleyman, specifically in the southern octagonal chamber of the west iwan, is a stucco plate now kept in Tehran at the National Museum of Iran. On this gypsum plate is a muqarnas plan believed to correspond to one quarter of the muqarnas vault of the southern chamber of the west iwan. This muqarnas plate is of the earliest known examples of an Islamic architectural plan for a muqarnas design. Although now broken into several pieces, the design on the plate consists of a geometric grid, 42 cm in length, for a curved muqarnas design. The majority of the design consists of squares, rhombi, and isosceles triangles all arranged along a diagonal axis with the empty upper right corner corresponding to the center of the muqarnas vault. The angles of each element are in multiples of 45° with few exceptions.

Scholars and archeologist of Islamic architecture have made numerous attempts to reconstruct the designs of the muqarnas plate found at Takht-e Soleyman to then understand what the muqarnas might have looked like in the palace. These scholars have based their designs in historical and cultural context by referencing the writings by Islamic mathematician and astronomer Ghiyath al-Din al-Kashi (in which he describes the use, design, and construction of muqarnas), various structures of the same Ilkhanid time period that contain muqarnas (the Great Mosque of Natanz and the tomb of Shaykh Abd al-Samad al-Isfahani of Natanz), previous interpretations of the muqarnas plate (chiefly of experts Ulrich Harb and Mohammad-Ali Jalal Yaghan), as well as the muqarnas traditions used today directly inherited through the traditions of the Ilkhanid period (as with the muqarnas workshops of Fez, Morocco).

=== Takht-e Soleyman tiles ===
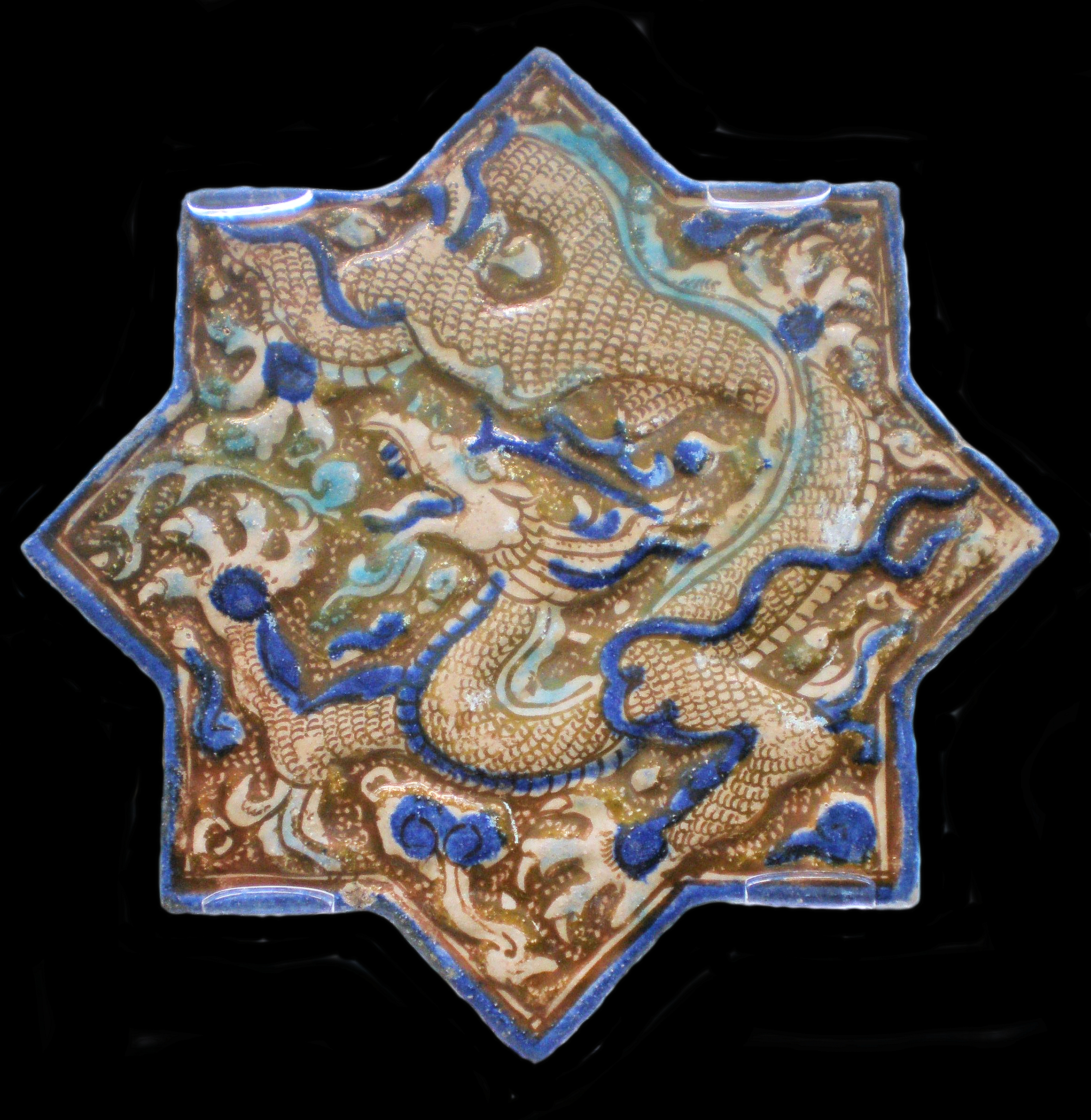
Ilkhanid wall-tile with Dragon. Made in Iran (Kashan). Probably Takht-i Sulayman, ca. 1270-75. Victoria and Albert Museum.

Tiles found at Takht-e Soleyman are great artistic marks that demonstrate the interaction with and influence from China during the fourteenth century. There were six types of tiles: unglazed, partly glazed, monochrome glazed, luster-painting, Lajvardina (cobalt blue and white), and inglazed Lajvardina. The exterior tiles, including unglazed, partly glazed and monochrome glazed, are shaped as hexagons and composed with reddish clay, with turquoise or blue coloring. The design is inspired by Mongol and Chinese ceramics, mainly from ceramics including dragon or phoenix motifs, and an interwoven line design. On the other hand, interior tiles include the luster-painting, Lajvardina and inglazed Lajvardina. They were white and yellow glazed, and were also usually hexagonal shaped. Regarding design, these tiles included multiple objects with floral, animal and human subjects, such as a horse rider surrounded by a floral arc. Geometric patterns were very prevalent, with the inclusion of interwoven lines, hexagon shaped tiles, and eight-pointed star symbols, deriving from Chinese ceramics that were very popular with Iranian merchants during the fourteenth century. The highly skilled glazing upon the tiles with their surface patterns in blue and white can be followed back to the Islamic city of Baghdad.

Takht-e Soleyman's tile decorations show a mixing of multiple cultures, using artistic traditions from Buddhism, Chinese mythology, and pre-Islamic Iran, and the current Islamic world itself. For example, the lotus flower, which is adopted from the Buddhist religion, is often used in floral designs as a symbol for wealth or is viewed as sacred. Secondly, as mentioned before, the dragon was a common motif related with Taoism, Confucianism, and Buddhism. It presented notions of sovereignty, and was viewed as the ancestor of all existing animals. The reinterpretation of a dragon or a lotus flower in an Iranian-Islamic way expanded the diversity of Islamic art in the medieval period. Thirdly, birds can also be seen in the tiles, specifically the crane, symbolizing longevity and wisdom from Chinese mythology. Mongol traditions are reflected in the frequent, deep blue color of the tiles, representing the sky or eternity. Also, there are Mongol scenes of horsemen hunting, expressing their important military matters.

Iranian elements, on the other hand, are also expressed in the Takht-e Soleyman tiles. These are mainly literary themes from the Shahnameh, the ‘Book of Kings’. The Shahnameh is a historical account of Iranian kings (shahs) and mythological matters through the use of calligraphy and illustrations. For example, a tile has an image of Fereydun, one of the legendary pre-Islamic Iranian kings, seen defeating the tyrant Zahhak. There is a tile with the image of the 5th century Sasanian monarch Bahram V, shown hunting deer with his slave Azada. Another scene is explained with calligraphy using a luster painting of Rustam (a famous Iranian warrior frequently included in the Shahnameh) killing his son, Sohrab. Using stories and images from the Shahnameh contributes to the integration of the Ilkhanid monarch into Iranian history, showing how Mongols are not just foreigners, but successors of Iran. There are also religious themes on the tiles, presented through Qur’an quotes, mentioning themes from the Shi’a branch of Islam. Many of the tiles were produced by craftsmen who followed the Shi’a path, where a hexagonal, exterior tile has the name ‘Ali’, the Prophet Muhammad's cousin, around the border six times.

The British explorers Theodore and Mabel Bent dug “in front of a mosque” at the site in early May 1889, returning to London later with at least one tile fragment.

== Gallery ==
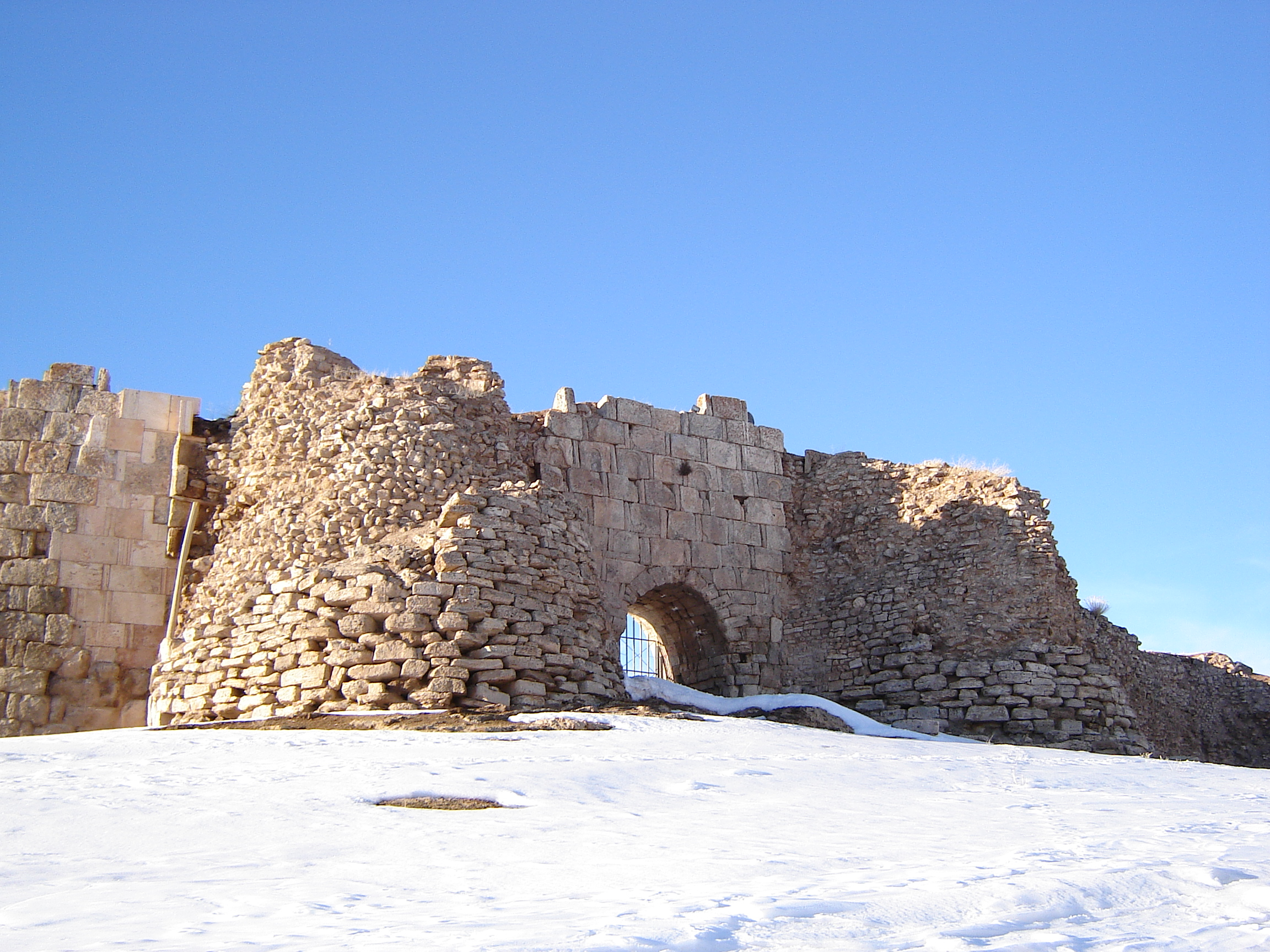
Ruins of Takht-e Soleyman's gate

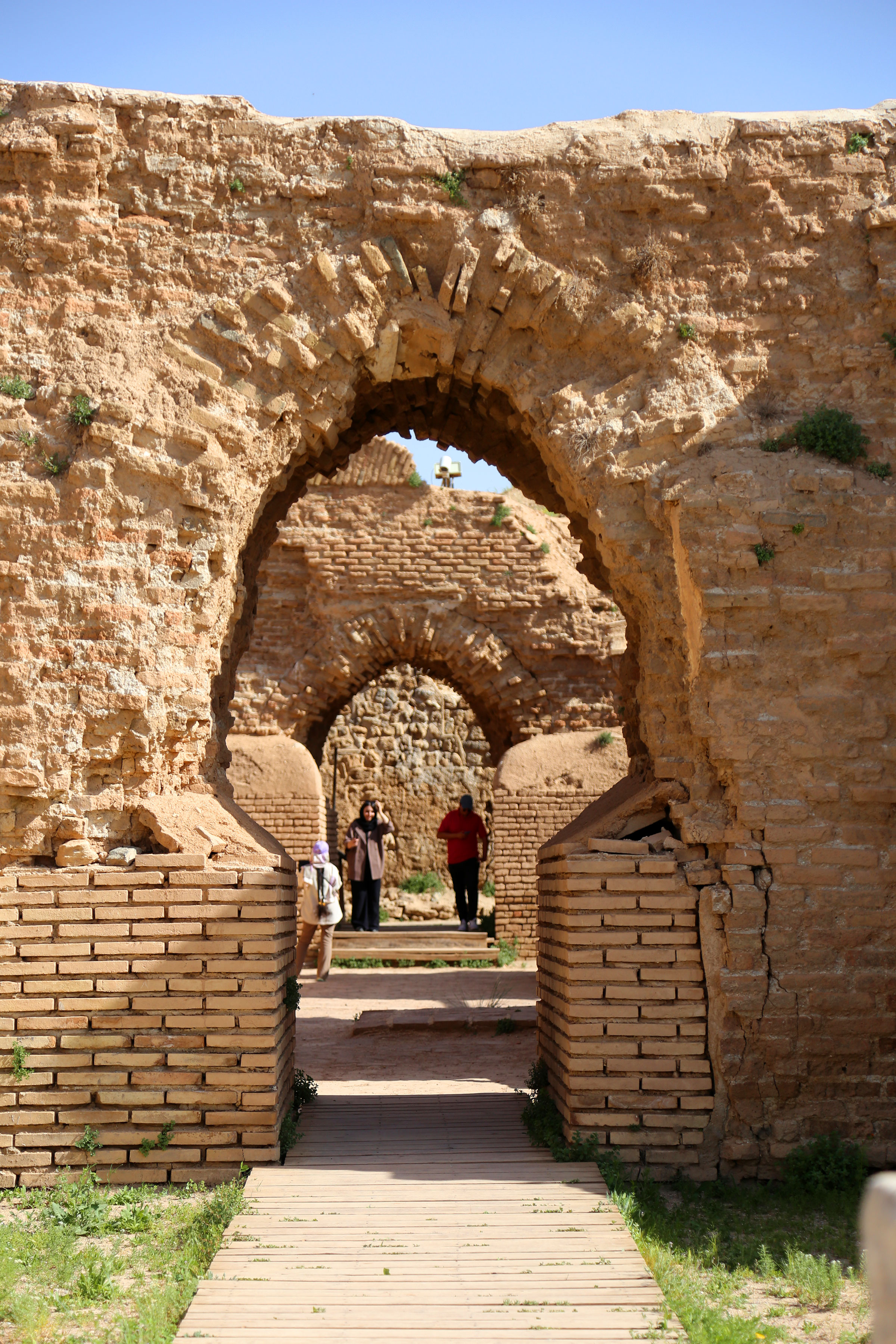
Takht-e Soleyman

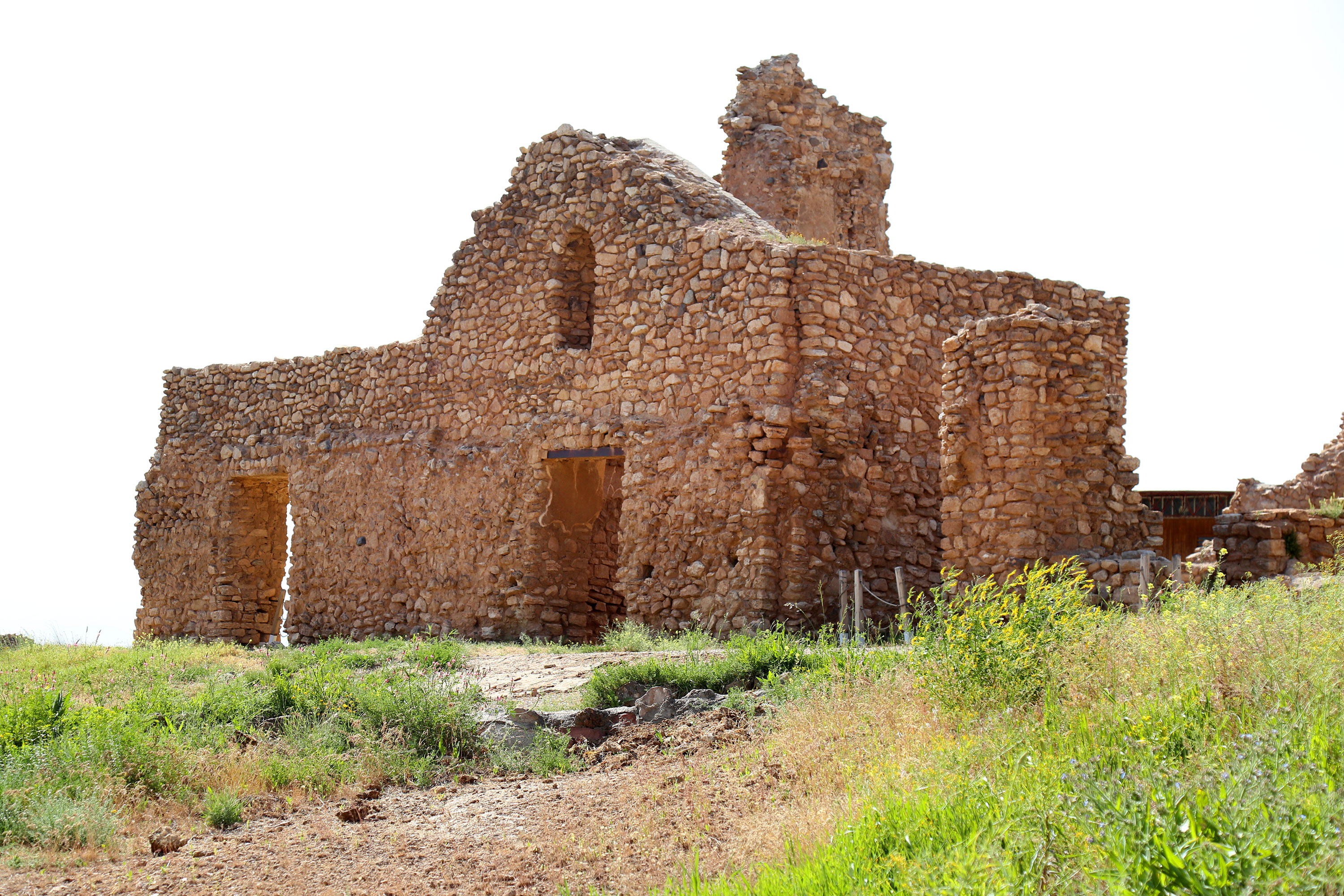
Takht-e Soleyman

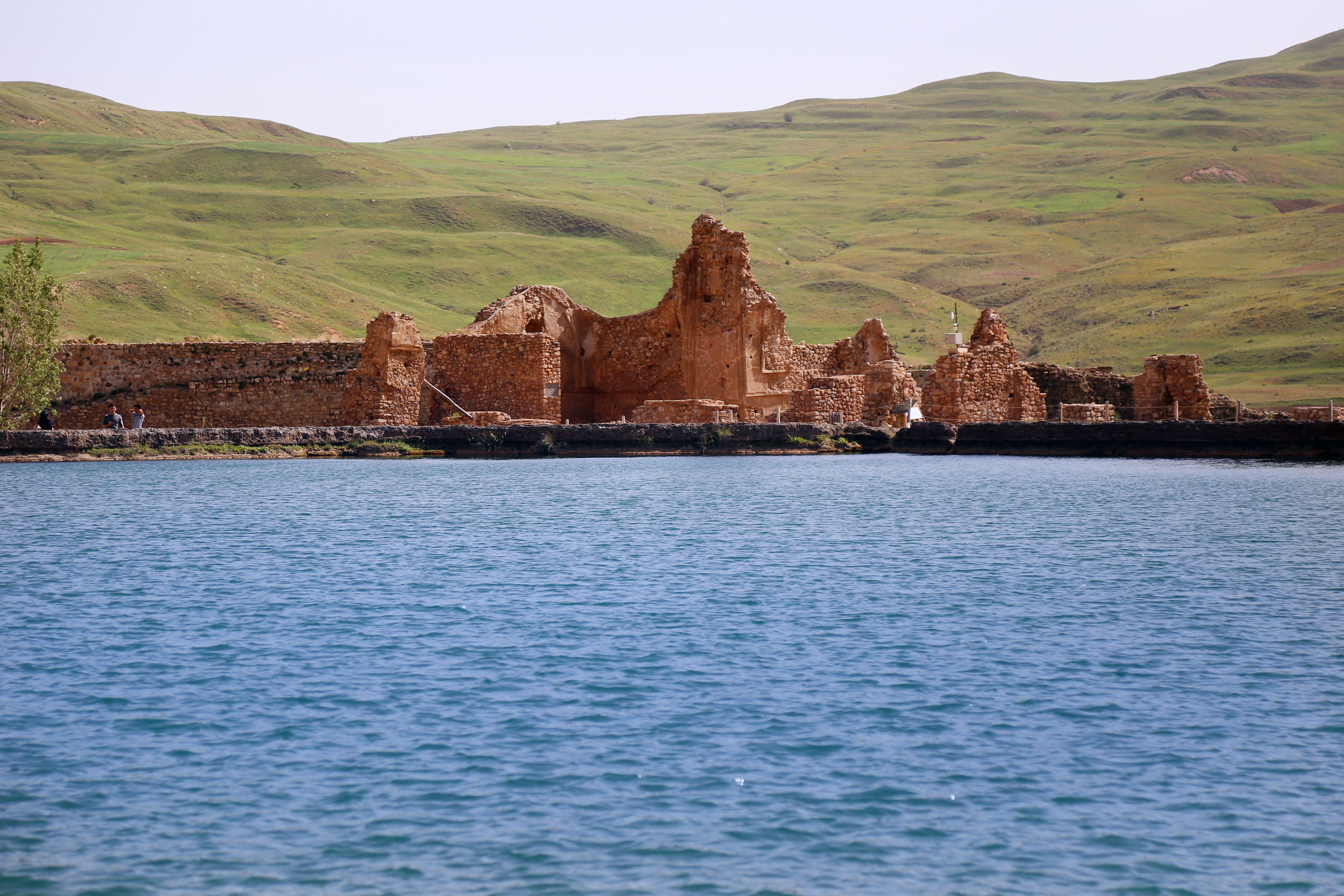
Takht-e Soleyman

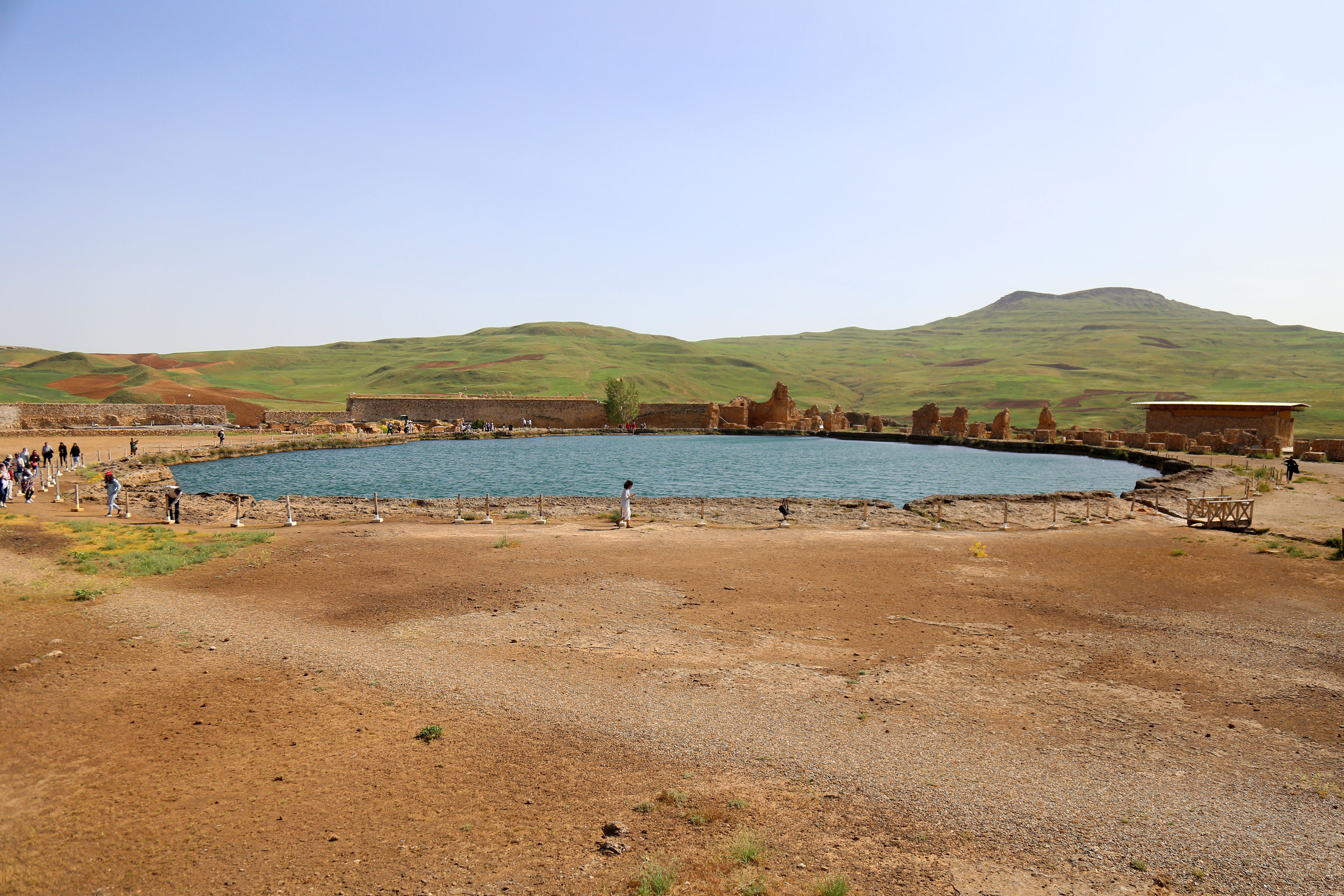
Takht-e Soleyman

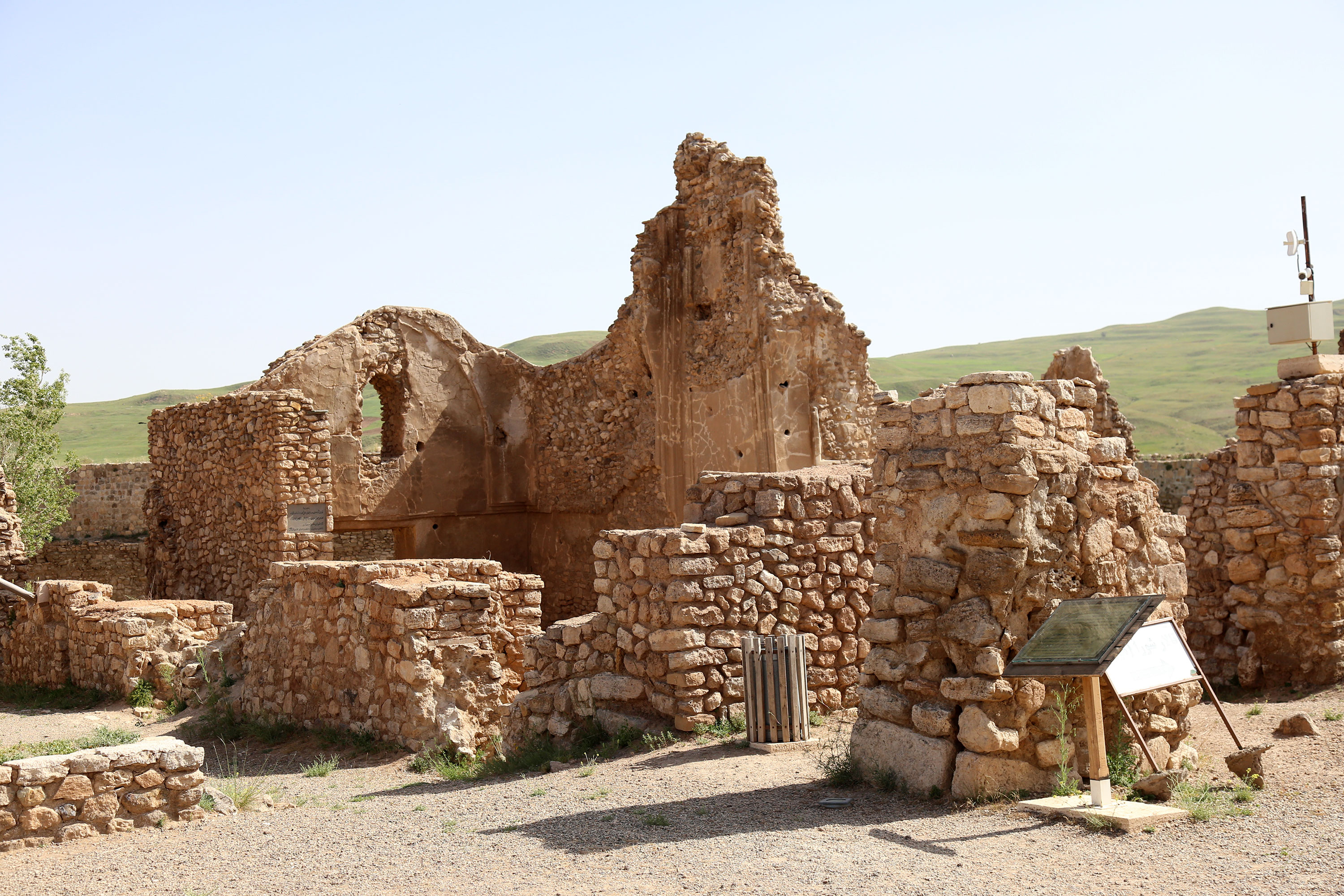
Takht-e Soleyman

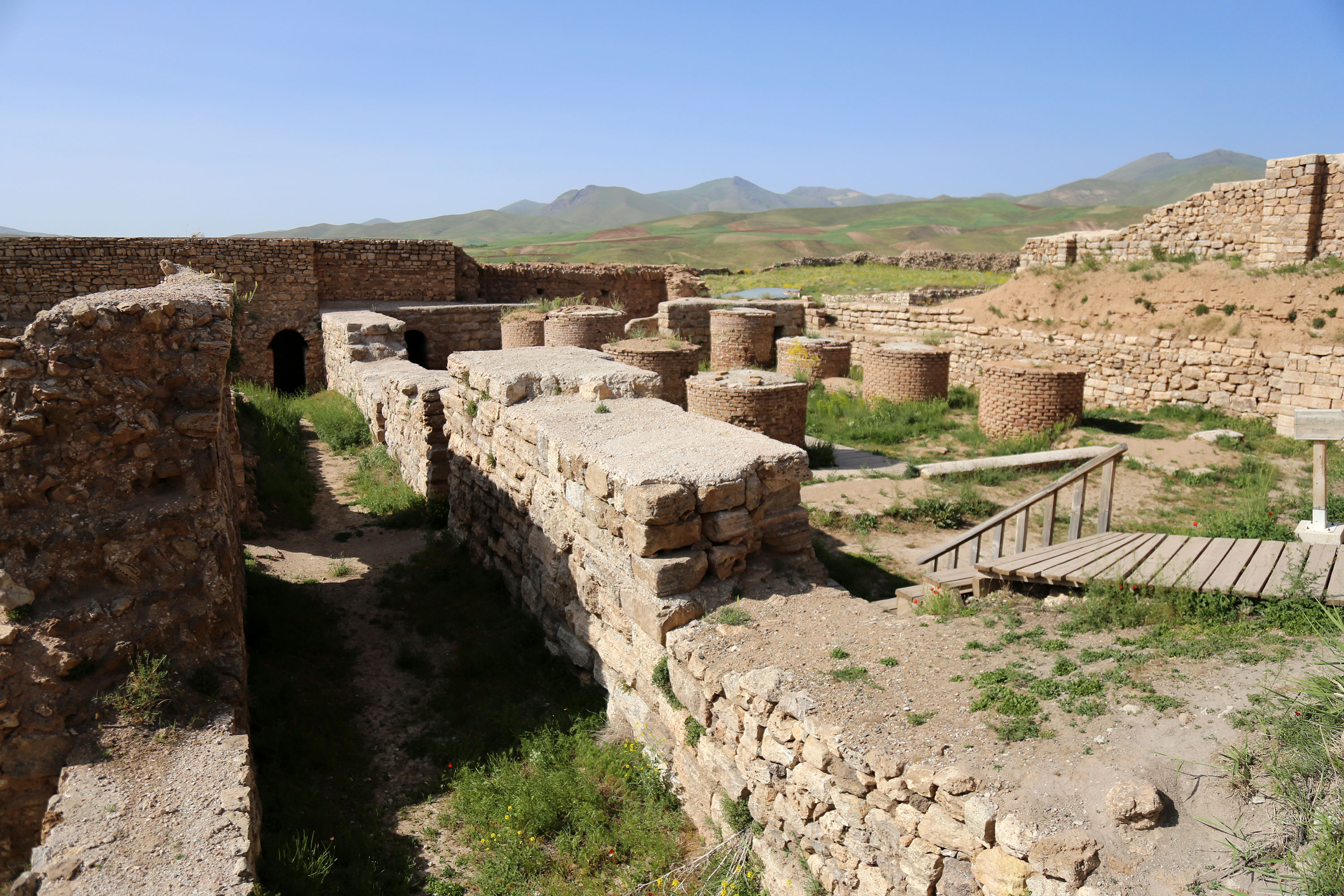
Takht-e Soleyman

== See also ==
- Cities of the Ancient Near East
- Derbent - another Sassanid fortress in the World Heritage List
- Iranian architecture
- List of Iranian castles
- Sassanid Dynasty
- Mount Takht-e Suleyman
- Cave of Daniel (Persian Wikipedia)
