= Saruq Rural District (Takab County) =

Rural district in West Azerbaijan province, Iran

Saruq Rural District Persian: دهستان ساروق
- Rural District
- Location within Iran
- Coordinates: 36°34′N 46°58′E
- Country: Iran
- Province: West Azerbaijan
- County: Takab
- District: Takht-e Soleyman
- Established: 1987
- Capital: Chowplu

Population (2016)
  - Total: 7,188
- Time zone: UTC+3:30 (IRST)

Saruq Rural District (Persian: دهستان ساروق) is in Takht-e Soleyman District of Takab County, West Azerbaijan province, Iran. Its capital is the village of Chowplu.

== Demographics ==
=== Population ===
At the time of the 2006 National Census, the rural district's population was 8,490 in 1,621 households. There were 8,113 inhabitants in 1,902 households at the following census of 2011. The 2016 census measured the population of the rural district as 7,188 in 2,007 households. The most populous of its 15 villages was Chowplu, with 1,788 people.

=== Other villages in the rural district ===
- Bash Barat
- Dash Qez Qapan
- Guy Aghaj
- Mayin Bolagh
- Nabi Kandi
- Qarah Omar
