= Ahmadabad Rural District (Takab County) =

Rural district in West Azerbaijan province, Iran

Ahmadabad Rural District Persian: دهستان احمدآباد
- Rural District
- Location within Iran
- Coordinates: 36°40′N 47°08′E
- Country: Iran
- Province: West Azerbaijan
- County: Takab
- District: Takht-e Soleyman
- Established: 1987
- Capital: Ahmadabad-e Sofla

Population (2016)
  - Total: 10,259
- Time zone: UTC+3:30 (IRST)

Ahmadabad Rural District (Persian: دهستان احمدآباد), (Note: Formerly Takht-e Soleyman Rural District (دهستان تحت سلیمان)) is in Takht-e Soleyman District of Takab County, West Azerbaijan province, Iran. Its capital is the village of Ahmadabad-e Sofla.

== Demographics ==
=== Population ===
At the time of the 2006 National Census, the rural district's population was 11,096 in 2,212 households. There were 10,120 inhabitants in 2,579 households at the following census of 2011. The 2016 census measured the population of the rural district as 10,259 in 3,087 households. The most populous of its 27 villages was Ahmadabad-e Sofla, with 2,046 people.

=== Other villages in the rural district ===
- Ahmadabad-e Olya
- Alucheluy-e Olya
- Alucheluy-e Sofla
- Angurud
- Aqdarreh-ye Olya
- Aqdarreh-ye Sofla
- Aqdarreh-ye Vosta
- Cheragh Tappeh-ye Sofla
- Hasanabad
- Qinarjeh
- Shir Mard
