= Takab County =

County in West Azerbaijan province, Iran

Takabb County Persian: شهرستان تکاب
- County
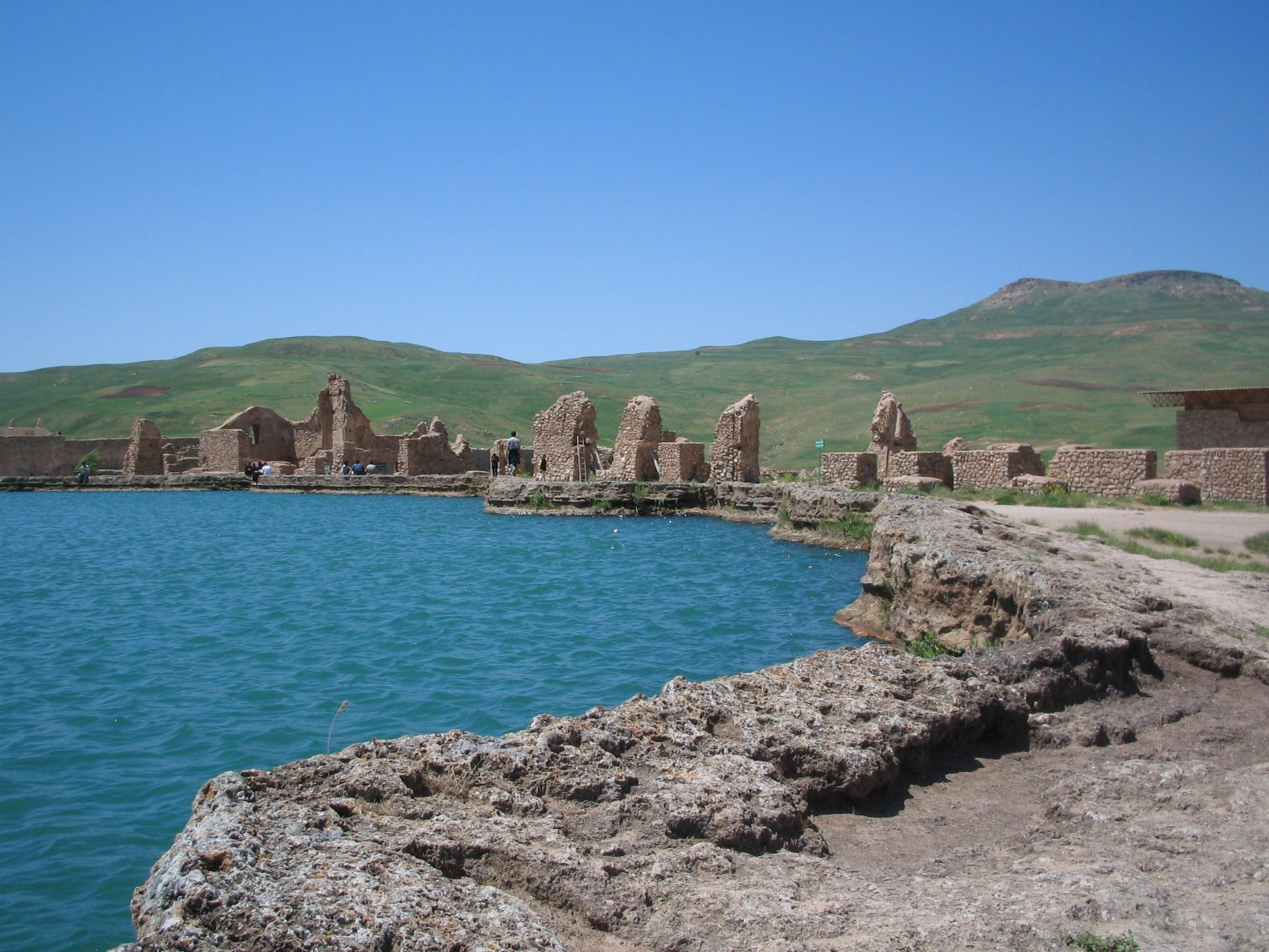
- Takht-e-Soleiman World Heritage Site

- Location of Takab County in West Azerbaijan province (bottom right, yellow)

- Location of West Azerbaijan province in Iran
- Coordinates: 36°32′N 47°08′E
- Country: Iran
- Province: West Azerbaijan
- Established: 1990
- Capital: Takab
- Districts: Central, Takht-e Soleyman

Population (2016)
  - Total: 80,556
- Time zone: UTC+3:30 (IRST)

Takab County (Persian: شهرستان تکاب) (Note: Also translated as Tekab County) is in West Azerbaijan province, Iran. Its capital is the city of Takab.

== History ==
The village of Tazeh Kand-e Nosratabad was upgraded to a city in 2020 and renamed Takht-e Soleyman in 2023.

== Demographics ==
=== Ethnicity and religion ===
About 65% of the population of the county are Shia Azerbaijanis and 35% are Sunni Kurds.

=== Population ===
At the time of the 2006 census, the county's population was 81,395 in 17,618 households. The following census in 2011 counted 78,122 people in 20,184 households. At the 2016 census, the population was 80,556 in 23,482 households.

=== Administrative divisions ===
Takab County's population history and administrative status over three consecutive censuses are shown in the following table.

Takab County Population
Administrative Divisions	2006	2011	2016
Central District	58,399	56,564	60,459
Afshar RD	4,265	3,814	3,335
Ansar RD	5,846	4,918	4,242
Karaftu RD	4,586	3,792	3,205
Takab (city)	43,702	44,040	49,677
Takht-e Soleyman District	22,996	21,558	20,097
Ahmadabad RD (Note: Formerly Takht-e Soleyman Rural District)	11,096	10,120	10,259
Chaman RD	3,410	3,325	2,650
Saruq RD	8,490	8,113	7,188
Takht-e Soleyman (city) (Note: Formerly the village of Tazeh Kand-e Nosratabad, became a city after the 2016 census)			
Total	81,395	78,122	80,556
RD = Rural District

== See also ==
Media related to Takab County at Wikimedia Commons
