= Takht-e Soleyman District =

District in West Azerbaijan province, Iran

Takht-e Soleyman District Persian: بخش تخت سلیمان
- District
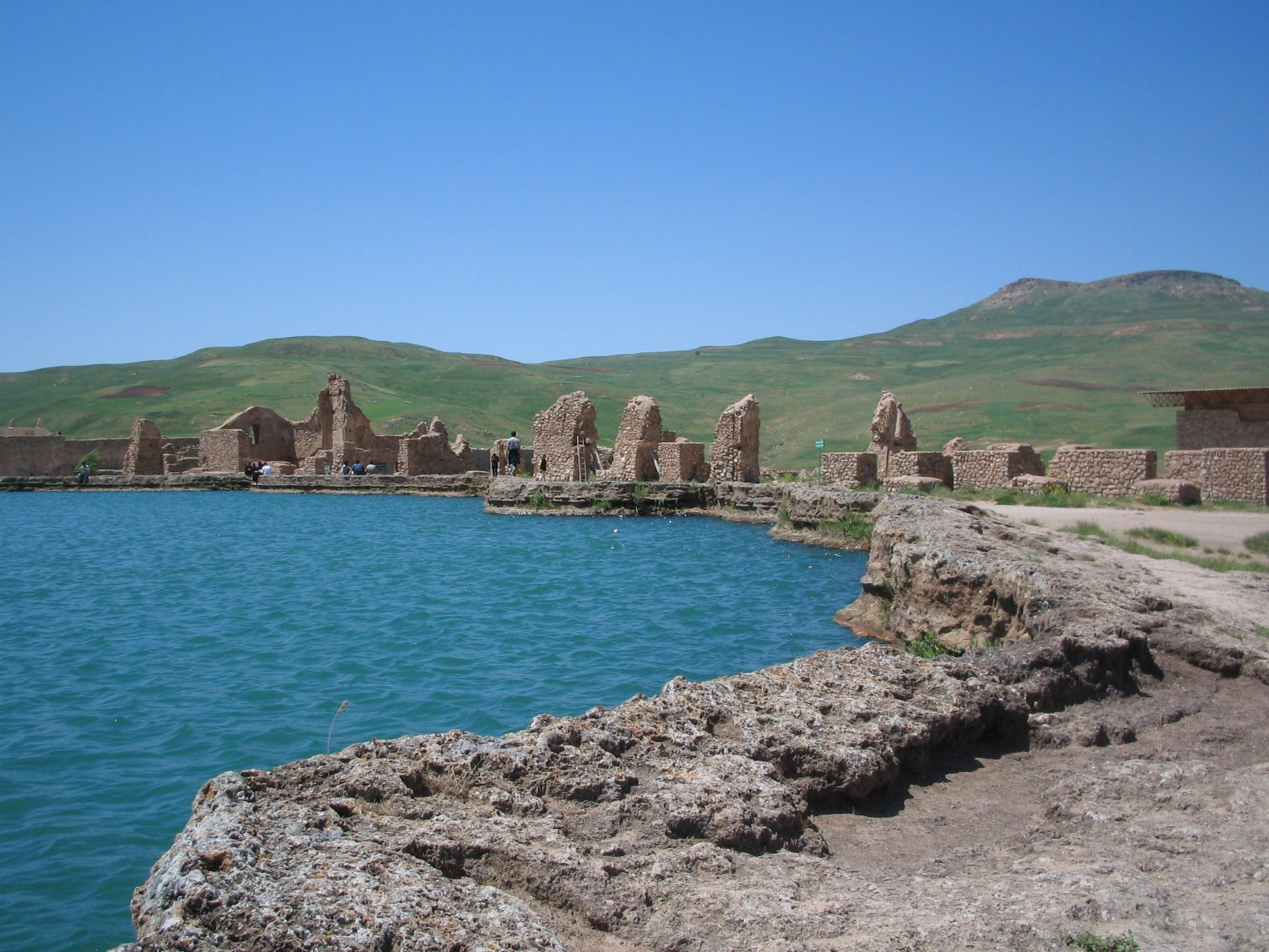
- Takht-e Soleyman World Heritage Site

- Location within Iran
- Coordinates: 36°38′N 47°10′E
- Country: Iran
- Province: West Azerbaijan
- County: Takab
- Established: 1990
- Capital: Takht-e Soleyman

Population (2016)
  - Total: 20,097
- Time zone: UTC+3:30 (IRST)

Takht-e Soleyman District (Persian: بخش تخت سلیمان) is in Takab County, West Azerbaijan province, Iran. Its capital is the city of Takht-e Soleyman. (Note: Formerly the village of Tazeh Kand-e Nosratabad) The district is the site of the Takht-e Soleyman ("Throne of Solomon") World Heritage Site.

== History ==
The village of Tazeh Kand-e Nosratabad was converted to a city in 2020 and renamed Takht-e Soleyman in 2023.

== Demographics ==
=== Population ===
At the time of the 2006 census, the district's population was 22,996 in 4,577 households. The following census in 2011 counted 21,558 people in 5,277 households. The 2016 census measured the population of the district as 20,097 inhabitants in 5,929 households.

=== Administrative divisions ===
Takht-e Soleyman District Population
Administrative Divisions	2006	2011	2016
Ahmadabad RD (Note: Formerly Takht-e Soleyman Rural District)	11,096	10,120	10,259
Chaman RD	3,410	3,325	2,650
Saruq RD	8,490	8,113	7,188
Takht-e Soleyman (city) (Note: Formerly the village of Tazeh Kand-e Nosratabad, became a city after the 2016 census)			
Total	22,996	21,558	20,097
RD = Rural District
