= Italy national football team records and statistics =

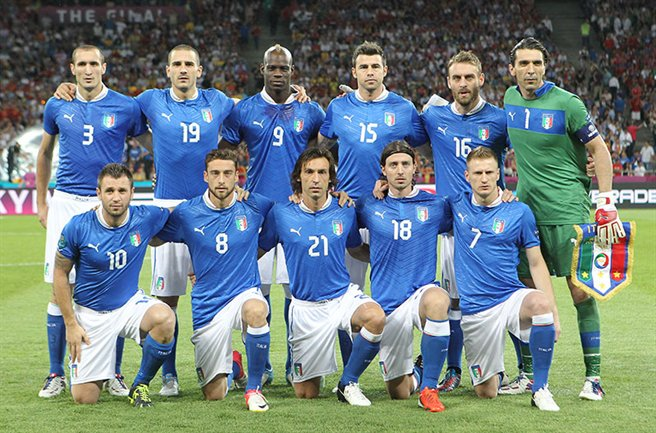
The national football team of Italy before the UEFA Euro 2012 final, Olympic Stadium, Kyiv, 1 July 2012

This article lists various football records and statistics of the Italy national football team.

== Honours ==
- FIFA World Cup

- Winners (4): 1934, 1938, 1982, 2006
- Runners-up (2): 1970, 1994
- Third place (1): 1990
- Fourth place (1): 1978

- UEFA European Championship

- Winners (2): 1968, 2020
- Runners-up (2): 2000, 2012
- Fourth place (1): 1980
- Semi-finals (1): 1988

- FIFA Confederations Cup

- Third place (1): 2013

- UEFA Nations League

- Third place (2): 2020–21, 2022–23

- Olympic football tournament

- Gold Medal (1): 1936
- Bronze Medal (2): 1928, 2004

- Central European International Cup

- Winners (2): 1927–30, 1933–35
- Runners-up (2): 1931–32, 1936–38 (Note: This edition of the tournament was interrupted due to the annexation of Austria to Nazi Germany on 12 March 1938.)

- CONMEBOL–UEFA Cup of Champions

- Runners-up (1): 2022

== Individual records ==
=== Players ===
==== Appearances ====
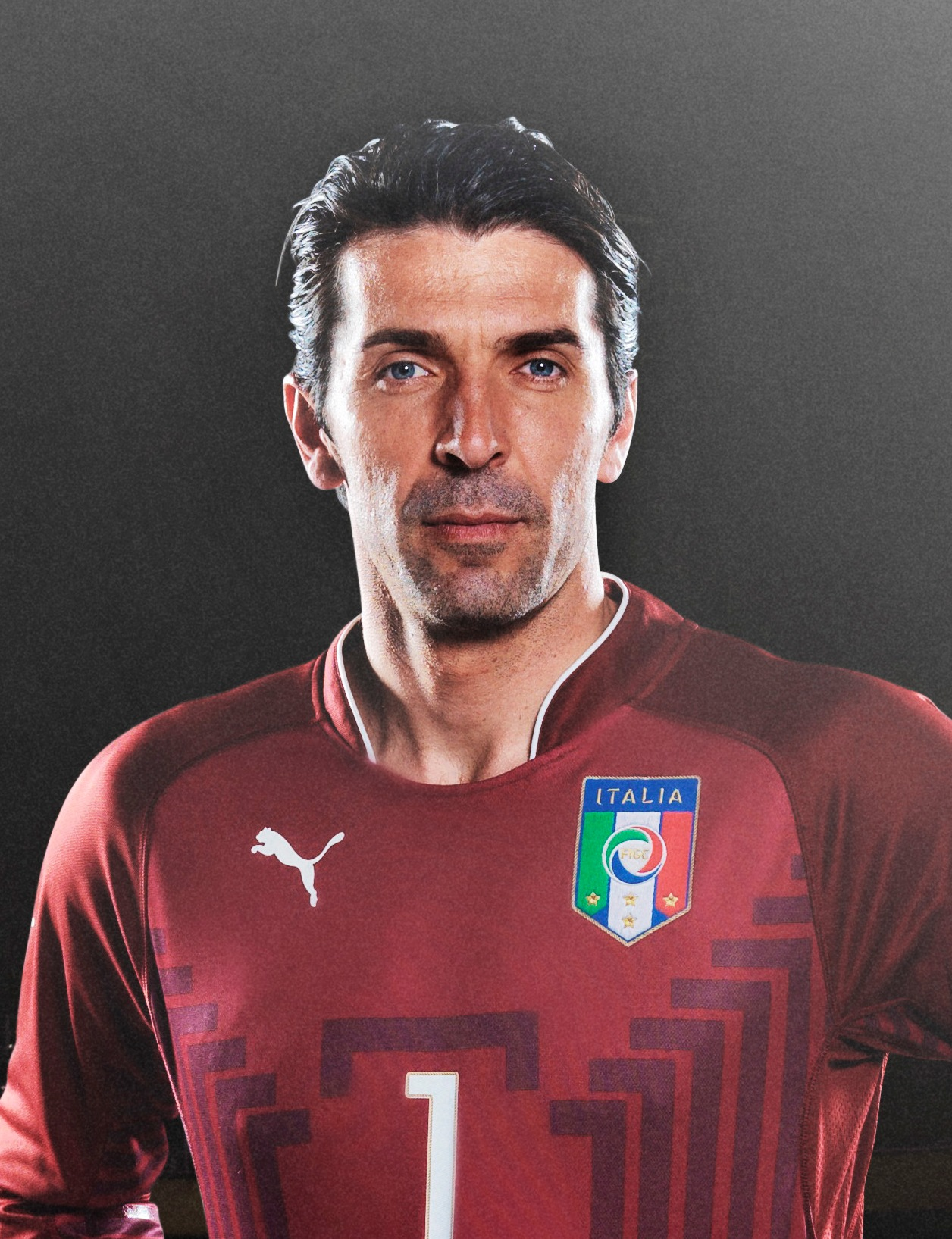
Gianluigi Buffon is the most capped player in the history of Italy with 176 caps.

Most appearances

As of 2 October 2026, the players with the most appearances for Italy are:

Players in bold are still active internationally.

Rank	Player	Caps	Goals	Period
1	Gianluigi Buffon	176	0	1997–2018
2	Fabio Cannavaro	136	2	1997–2010
3	Paolo Maldini	126	7	1988–2002
4	Leonardo Bonucci	121	8	2010–2023
5	Giorgio Chiellini	117	8	2004–2022
5	Daniele De Rossi	117	21	2004–2017
7	Andrea Pirlo	116	13	2002–2015
8	Dino Zoff	112	0	1968–1983
9	Gianluca Zambrotta	98	2	1999–2010
10	Giacinto Facchetti	94	3	1963–1977

===== FIFA World Cup =====
Most appearances at the FIFA World Cup
Paolo Maldini, 23
Most appearances at the FIFA World Cup qualifiers
Gianluigi Buffon, 39
Most appearances at the FIFA World Cup and FIFA World Cup qualifiers
Fabio Cannavaro, 50
Most minutes played in FIFA World Cup matches
Paolo Maldini, 2,216 minutes
Most FIFA World Cups part of the squad
Gianluigi Buffon (1998 (Note: Unused substitute.), 2002, 2006, 2010, 2014), 5
Most FIFA World Cups played in
Gianluigi Buffon, Gianni Rivera, Giuseppe Bergomi, Paolo Maldini and Fabio Cannavaro, 4 each (Note: Dino Zoff was also named to four of Italy's FIFA World Cup squads, but only featured in three of them (1974, 1978, and 1982), as he was an unused substitute in 1970.)

===== UEFA European Championship =====
Most appearances at the UEFA European Championship
Leonardo Bonucci, 18
Most appearances in UEFA European Championship qualifying
Gianluigi Buffon, 41
Most appearances at the UEFA European Championship and UEFA European Championship qualifying
Gianluigi Buffon, 58
Most minutes played in European Championship matches
Leonardo Bonucci, 1,668 minutes
Most European Championships part of the squad
Alessandro Del Piero (1996, 2000, 2004, 2008), Gianluigi Buffon (2004, 2008, 2012, 2016) and Giorgio Chiellini (2008, 2012, 2016, 2020), 4
Most UEFA European Championships played in
Gianluigi Buffon, Alessandro Del Piero and Giorgio Chiellini, 4

===== UEFA Nations League =====
Most appearances in the UEFA Nations League
Gianluigi Donnarumma, 32

===== FIFA Confederations Cup =====
Most appearances at the FIFA Confederations Cup
Gianluigi Buffon, Giorgio Chiellini and Riccardo Montolivo, 8 each
Most FIFA Confederations Cups played in
Gianluigi Buffon, Giorgio Chiellini, Daniele De Rossi, Andrea Pirlo, Riccardo Montolivo and Alberto Gilardino, 2 each (2009 and 2013)

===== Others =====
Most appearances at the Central European International Cup
Giuseppe Meazza, 16
Most appearances at the Olympics
Adolfo Baloncieri, 11
Most appearances as a substitute
Alessandro Del Piero, 30
Most appearances as a substitute at the FIFA World Cup
Alessandro Del Piero, 7
Most appearances as a substitute at the UEFA European Championship
Alessandro Del Piero, 6
Most appearances for Italy wearing the number 10 shirt
Giancarlo Antognoni
Most FIFA World Cup matches won
Paolo Maldini, 14

==== Age ====
Oldest player
Dino Zoff, 41 years 89 days, 29 May 1983, 0–2 vs. Sweden
Youngest player
Renzo De Vecchi, 16 years 112 days, 26 May 1910, 6–1 vs. Hungary
Youngest outfield player to feature in a match post-World War II
Simone Pafundi, 16 years 242 days, 16 November 2022, 3–1 vs. Albania
Youngest unofficial (Note: Unofficial due to Rodolfo Gavinelli's reported date of birth (1 January 1895) not being entirely certain, as according to some sources, he was born in 1891.) player to feature in a match
Rodolfo Gavinelli, 16 years 98 days, 9 April 1911, 2–2 vs. France
Youngest forward to start in a match
Eugenio Mosso, 18 years 238 days, 5 April 1914, 1–1 vs. Switzerland
Youngest unofficial forward to start in a match
Rodolfo Gavinelli, 16 years 98 days, 9 April 1911, 2–2 vs. France
Oldest debutant
Emiliano Moretti, 33 years 160 days, 18 November 2014, 1–0 vs. Albania
Oldest player to feature at the FIFA World Cup
Dino Zoff, 40 years 133 days, 11 July 1982, 3–1 vs. West Germany
Youngest player to feature at the FIFA World Cup
Giuseppe Bergomi, 18 years 195 days, 5 July 1982, 3–2 vs. Brazil
Oldest player to feature at a FIFA World Cup Final
Dino Zoff, 40 years 133 days, 11 July 1982, 3–1 vs. West Germany
Youngest player to feature at a FIFA World Cup Final
Giuseppe Bergomi, 18 years 201 days, 11 July 1982, 3–1 vs. West Germany
Oldest player to feature at the UEFA European Championship
Gianluigi Buffon, 38 years and 156 days, 2 July 2016, 1–1 (6–5) vs. Germany
Oldest outfield player to feature at the UEFA European Championship
Giorgio Chiellini, 36 years and 331 days, 11 July 2021, 1–1 (3–2) vs. England
Youngest player to feature at the UEFA European Championship
Paolo Maldini, 19 years and 350 days, 10 June 1988, 1–1 vs. West Germany
Oldest player to feature at a UEFA European Championship Final
Giorgio Chiellini, 36 years and 331 days, 11 July 2021, 1–1 (3–2) vs. England
Youngest goalkeeper to feature in a match
Gianluigi Donnarumma, 17 years 189 days, 1 September 2016, 1–3 vs. France
Youngest goalkeeper to start a match
Gianluigi Donnarumma, 18 years 31 days, 28 March 2017, 2–1 vs. Netherlands
Most FIFA World Cup titles
Giovanni Ferrari, Giuseppe Meazza, Eraldo Monzeglio, 2 each (1934 and 1938) (Note: Guido Masetti was also in Italy's 1934 and 1938 FIFA World Cup winning squads, but did not feature in any World Cup matches, as he was a reserve goalkeeper on both occasions.)
Most Central European International Cup titles
Giuseppe Meazza, Eraldo Monzeglio and Alfredo Pitto, 2 each (1927–30 and 1933–35)
Only player to win both the FIFA World Cup and the UEFA European Championship
Dino Zoff (1968 and 1982)
Only players to win both the FIFA World Cup and the Olympic Gold Medal
Sergio Bertoni, Alfredo Foni, Ugo Locatelli, Pietro Rava (1936 and 1938)
Longest career
Gianluigi Buffon, 29 October 1997–23 March 2018, 20 years, 145 days

==== Goalscorers ====
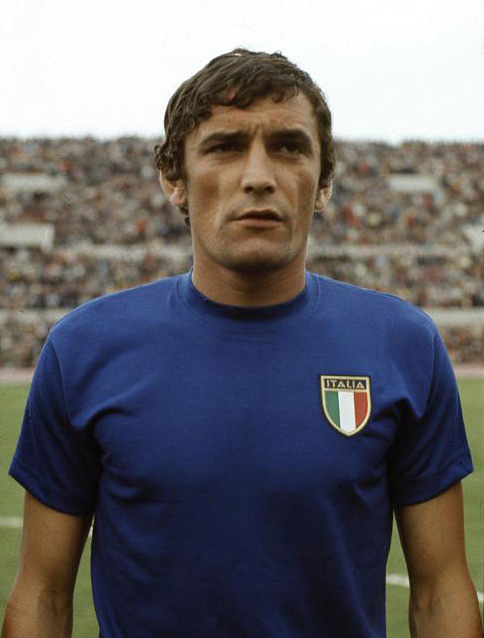
Gigi Riva is the top scorer in the history of Italy with 35 goals.

Most goals

As of 2 October 2026, the players with the most goals for Italy are:

Players in bold are still active internationally.

Rank	Player	Goals	Period	Caps	Average
1	Gigi Riva (list)	35	1965–1974	42	0.83
2	Giuseppe Meazza	33	1930–1939	53	0.62
3	Silvio Piola	30	1935–1952	34	0.88
4	Roberto Baggio	27	1988–2004	56	0.48
4	Alessandro Del Piero	27	1995–2008	91	0.30
6	Adolfo Baloncieri	25	1920–1930	47	0.53
6	Alessandro Altobelli	25	1980–1988	61	0.41
6	Filippo Inzaghi	25	1997–2007	57	0.44
9	Francesco Graziani	23	1975–1983	64	0.36
9	Christian Vieri	23	1997–2005	49	0.47

First goal
Pietro Lana, 15 May 1910, 6–2 vs. France
Most goals at the FIFA World Cup
Christian Vieri, Paolo Rossi and Roberto Baggio, 9 each
Most goals at a single FIFA World Cup
Paolo Rossi (1982) and Salvatore Schillaci (1990), 6 each
Most goals at the FIFA World Cup and FIFA World Cup qualifiers
Gigi Riva, 17
Most FIFA World Cups scored in
Roberto Baggio (1990, 1994 and 1998), 3
Most goals in FIFA World Cup qualifiers
Gigi Riva, 14
First goal in a FIFA World Cup match
Angelo Schiavio, 27 May 1934, 7–1 vs. United States
First goal in a FIFA World Cup qualifier match
Anfilogino Guarisi, 25 March 1934, 4–0 vs. Greece
Most goals at the UEFA European Championship
Mario Balotelli and Antonio Cassano, 3 each
Most goals at a single UEFA European Championship
Mario Balotelli (2012), 3
Most UEFA European Championship scored in
Nicolò Barella (2020 and 2024), Leonardo Bonucci (2016 and 2020), Antonio Cassano (2004 and 2012), Andrea Pirlo (2008 and 2012), 2 each
Most goals at the UEFA European Championship and the UEFA European Championship qualifying
Filippo Inzaghi, 14
Most goals in UEFA European Championship qualifying
Filippo Inzaghi, 12
First goal in a UEFA European Championship match
Angelo Domenghini, 8 June 1968, 1–1 vs. Yugoslavia
First goal in a UEFA European Championship qualifying match
Gianni Rivera, 2 December 1962, 6–0 vs. Turkey
Most goals at the UEFA Nations League
Davide Frattesi, 6
Most goals at the FIFA Confederations Cup
Mario Balotelli, Giuseppe Rossi and Daniele De Rossi, 2 each
Most goals at a single FIFA Confederations Cup
Mario Balotelli (2013) and Giuseppe Rossi (2009), 2 each
First goal in a FIFA Confederations Cup match
Giuseppe Rossi, 15 June 2009, 3–1 vs. United States
Most goals at the Central European International Cup
Giuseppe Meazza, 8
First goal in a Central European International Cup match
Julio Libonatti, 23 October 1927, 2–2 vs. Czechoslovakia
Most goals at the Olympics
Adolfo Baloncieri, 8
First goal in an Olympic match
Franco Bontadini, 29 June 1912, 2–3 vs. Finland
Most goals in Friendlies
Giuseppe Meazza, 20
Fastest goal
Emanuele Giaccherini, 19 seconds, 11 June 2013, 2–2 vs. Haiti
Fastest goal at the FIFA World Cup
Pietro Ferraris, 5 June 1938, 2–1 vs. Norway, and Bruno Mora, 7 June 1962, 3–0 vs. Switzerland, both in the 2nd minute of play
Fastest goal at the UEFA European Championship
Pierluigi Casiraghi, 11 June 1996, 2–1 vs. Russia, after 5 minutes
Fastest goal by a substitute at the UEFA European Championship
Alessandro Altobelli, 17 June 1988, 2–0 vs. Denmark, after 1 minute
Oldest goalscorer
Fabio Quagliarella, 36 years 54 days, 26 March 2019, 6–0 vs. Liechtenstein
Youngest goalscorer
Wilfried Gnonto, 18 years 222 days, 14 June 2022, 2–5 vs. Germany
Oldest goalscorer in a competitive match
Fabio Quagliarella, 36 years 54 days, 26 March 2019, 6–0 vs. Liechtenstein
Youngest goalscorer in a competitive match
Wilfried Gnonto, 18 years 222 days, 14 June 2022, 2–5 vs. Germany
Oldest goalscorer at the FIFA World Cup
Daniele Massaro, 33 years 36 days, 28 June 1994, 1–1 vs. Mexico
Youngest goalscorer at the FIFA World Cup
Giacomo Bulgarelli, 21 years 226 days, 7 June 1962, 3–0 vs. Switzerland
Oldest goalscorer at the UEFA European Championship
Christian Panucci, 35 years 62 days, 13 June 2008, 1–1 vs. Romania
Oldest goalscorer in a UEFA European Championship final
Leonardo Bonucci, 34 years 71 days, 11 July 2021, 1–1 vs. England
Youngest goalscorer in a UEFA European Championship final
Pietro Anastasi, 20 years 64 days, 10 June 1968, 2–0 vs. Yugoslavia
Oldest goalscorer in a UEFA European Championship qualifying match
Fabio Quagliarella, 36 years 54 days, 26 March 2019, 6–0 vs. Liechtenstein
Youngest goalscorer in a UEFA European Championship qualifying match
Moise Kean, 19 years 23 days, 23 March 2019, 2–0 vs. Finland
Youngest player to score a brace
Bruno Nicolè, 18 years 258 days, 9 November 1958, 2–2 vs. France
Youngest player to score a brace in a competitive match
Gianni Rivera, 19 years 206 days, 2 December 1962, 6–0 vs. Turkey
Youngest player to score a brace in a UEFA European Championship qualifying match
Gianni Rivera, 19 years 206 days, 2 December 1962, 6–0 vs. Turkey
Most goals by a midfielder
Adolfo Baloncieri, 25
Most goals by a midfielder post-World War II
Daniele De Rossi, 21
Most goals by a defender
Antonio Cabrini, 9
Most goals from a penalty kick
Roberto Baggio, 7
Most goals from a penalty kick at the FIFA World Cup
Roberto Baggio, 2
Most goals from a penalty kick at the UEFA European Championship
Leonardo Bonucci, Filippo Inzaghi and Andrea Pirlo, 1 each
Most goals from a penalty kick in a single match
Alessandro Del Piero, 2, 11 October 2000, 2–0 vs. Georgia
Most goals in penalty shoot-outs
Franco Baresi and Andrea Pirlo, 3 each
Most goals as a substitute
Enrico Chiesa and Alessandro Del Piero, 5 each
Most goals as a substitute at the FIFA World Cup
Alessandro Del Piero and Gianni Rivera, 2 each
Most goals as a substitute at the UEFA European Championship
Alessandro Altobelli, Mario Balotelli, Federico Chiesa, Luigi De Agostini, Antonio Di Natale and Matteo Pessina, 1 each
Most own goals
Sandro Salvadore, 2
Most own goals at the FIFA World Cup
Cristian Zaccardo, 1, 17 June 2006, 1–1 vs. United States
Italy's 100th goal at the FIFA World Cup finals
Luigi Di Biagio, 17 June 1998, 3–0 vs. Cameroon

===== Hat-tricks =====
Three goals or more in a single match on the greatest number of occasions
Gigi Riva, 3 times
Most hat-tricks at a FIFA World Cup
Angelo Schiavio, 27 May 1934, 7–1 vs. United States, and Paolo Rossi, 5 July 1982, 3–2 vs. Brazil, 1 each

As of 22 June 2024

Scores and results list Italy's goal tally first.

Player	Competition	Against	Home/Away	Result	Goals	Date
Carlo Biagi	1936 Summer Olympics	Japan	Home	8–0	4	7 August 1936
Francesco Pernigo	1948 Summer Olympics	United States	Home	9–0	4	2 August 1948
Omar Sívori	1962 FIFA World Cup qualification	Israel	Home	6–0	4	4 November 1961
Alberto Orlando	UEFA Euro 1964 qualifying	Turkey	Home	6–0	4	2 December 1962
Gigi Riva	1974 FIFA World Cup qualification	Luxembourg	Home	5–0	4	31 March 1973
Roberto Bettega	1978 FIFA World Cup qualification	Finland	Home	6–1	4	15 October 1977
Pietro Lana	Friendly	France	Home	6–2	3	15 May 1910
Ermanno Aebi	Friendly	France	Home	9–4	3	18 January 1920
Guglielmo Brezzi	Friendly	France	Home	9–4	3	18 January 1920
Adolfo Baloncieri	Friendly	Switzerland	Away	5–1	3	30 January 1927
Angelo Schiavio	1928 Summer Olympics	Egypt	Home	11–3	3	9 June 1928
Elvio Banchero	1928 Summer Olympics	Egypt	Home	11–3	3	9 June 1928
Mario Magnozzi	1928 Summer Olympics	Egypt	Home	11–3	3	9 June 1928
Gino Rossetti	1927–30 Central European International Cup	Czechoslovakia	Home	4–2	3	3 March 1929
Giuseppe Meazza	Central European International Cup	Hungary	Away	5–0	3	11 May 1930
Giuseppe Meazza	Friendly	France	Home	5–0	3	25 January 1931
Francesco Fedullo	1931–32 Central European International Cup	Switzerland	Home	3–0	3	14 February 1932
Angelo Schiavio	1934 FIFA World Cup	United States	Home	7–1	3	27 May 1934
Annibale Frossi	1936 Summer Olympics	Japan	Home	8–0	3	7 August 1936
Silvio Piola	Friendly	Belgium	Home	6–1	3	15 May 1938
Silvio Piola	Friendly	Finland	Away	3–2	3	20 July 1939
Romeo Menti	Friendly	Switzerland	Home	5–2	3	27 April 1947
Aredio Gimona	1952 Summer Olympics	United States	Home	8–0	3	16 July 1952
Sergio Brighenti	Unofficial friendly	Empoli F.C.	Home	4–1	3	22 April 1959
Paolo Barison	1966 FIFA World Cup qualification	Poland	Home	6–1	3	1 November 1965
Sandro Mazzola	Unofficial friendly	DBU Copenhagen	Away	4–0	3	6 July 1966
Gigi Riva	1968 UEFA Euro qualifying	Cyprus	Home	5–0	3	1 November 1967
Gigi Riva	1970 FIFA World Cup qualification	Wales	Home	4–1	3	4 November 1969
Francesco Graziani	Unofficial friendly	United States	Home	10–0	3	4 April 1975
Paolo Rossi	1982 FIFA World Cup	Brazil	Home	3–2	3	5 July 1982
Paolo Rossi	Friendly	Mexico	Home	5–0	3	4 February 1984
Alessandro Altobelli	Unofficial friendly	Guatemala	Home	4–0	3	24 May 1986
Enrico Chiesa	FIGC Centenary	World XI	Home	6–2	3	16 December 1998
Filippo Inzaghi	UEFA Euro 2004 qualifying	Wales	Home	4–0	3	6 September 2003
Luca Toni	2006 FIFA World Cup qualification	Belarus	Away	4–1	3	7 September 2005
Alberto Gilardino	2010 FIFA World Cup qualification	Cyprus	Home	3–2	3	14 October 2009
Ciro Immobile	Unofficial friendly	Fluminense FC	Away	5–3	3	8 June 2014
Gianluca Lapadula	Unofficial friendly	San Marino	Home	8–0	3	31 May 2017

==== Goalkeeping ====
Most clean sheets
Gianluigi Buffon, 77
Fewest goals conceded in a single FIFA World Cup by a starting FIFA World Cup winning goalkeeper
Gianluigi Buffon (2006), 2
Most clean sheets in a single FIFA World Cup
Gianluigi Buffon (2006) and Walter Zenga (1990), 5 each
Most clean sheets at the FIFA World Cup
Gianluigi Buffon, 6
Most clean sheets at the UEFA European Championship
Gianluigi Buffon, 8
Most clean sheets at the FIFA Confederations Cup
Gianluigi Buffon, 1
Most clean sheets in the Central European International Cup
Gianpiero Combi, 4
Most clean sheets at the Summer Olympics
Giovanni De Prà and Bruno Venturini, 2 each
Most clean sheets in FIFA World Cup qualifying matches
Gianluigi Buffon, 21
Most clean sheets in UEFA European Championship qualifying matches
Gianluigi Buffon, 23
Most clean sheets in friendlies
Dino Zoff, 27
Longest unbeaten streak
Dino Zoff, 1,142 minutes
Longest unbeaten streak at the FIFA World Cup
Walter Zenga, 518 minutes
Most consecutive clean sheets at the FIFA World Cup
Walter Zenga, 5
Longest unbeaten streak at the UEFA European Championship
Dino Zoff, 494 minutes
Longest unbeaten streak in UEFA European Championship qualifying matches
Gianluigi Buffon, 644 minutes
Longest unbeaten streak in UEFA European Championship and UEFA European Championship qualifying matches
Dino Zoff, 784 minutes (including 8 consecutive clean sheets, 1975–80)
Fewest goals conceded in a single UEFA European Championship by a starting UEFA European Championship winning goalkeeper
Dino Zoff (1968), 1
Most penalty kicks saved (not including shoot-outs)
Gianluigi Buffon, 5
Most penalty kicks saved at the FIFA World Cup (not including shoot-outs)
Gianluigi Buffon, 1
Most penalty kicks saved at the UEFA European Championship (not including shoot-outs)
Gianluigi Buffon and Francesco Toldo, 1 each
Most penalty kicks saved in UEFA European Championship penalty shoot-outs
Gianluigi Buffon and Gianluigi Donnarumma, 3 each
Most penalty kicks saved in a single UEFA European Championship penalty shoot-out
Francesco Toldo and Gianluigi Donnarumma, 2 each

==== Captains ====
First captain
Francesco Calì, 15 May 1910, 6–2 vs. France
Youngest captain
Bruno Nicolè, 21 years 61 days, 25 April 1961, 3–2 vs. Northern Ireland
Most appearances as captain
Gianluigi Buffon, 80
Most appearances as captain as a goalkeeper
Gianluigi Buffon, 80
Most appearances as captain at the UEFA European Championship
Gianluigi Buffon, 13 (2008–2016) (Note: Buffon was named Italy's second acting captain under Roberto Donadoni for Euro 2008 after incumbent Fabio Cannavaro was ruled out of the tournament due to injury, and as Italy's replacement captain Alessandro Del Piero was frequently deployed as a substitute.)
Longest serving captain
Giacinto Facchetti, 1966–1977

List of captaincy periods of the various captains throughout the years.

- 1910 Francesco Calì
- 1911–1913 Giuseppe Milano
- 1914–1915 Virgilio Fossati
- 1920–1925 Renzo De Vecchi
- 1925–1927 Luigi Cevenini
- 1927–1930 Adolfo Baloncieri
- 1931–1933 Umberto Caligaris
- 1934 Gianpiero Combi
- 1935–1936 Luigi Allemandi
- 1937–1939 Giuseppe Meazza
- 1940–1947 Silvio Piola
- 1947–1949 Valentino Mazzola
- 1949–1950 Riccardo Carapellese
- 1951–1952 Carlo Annovazzi
- 1952–1960 Giampiero Boniperti
- 1961–1962 Lorenzo Buffon
- 1962–1963 Cesare Maldini
- 1963–1966 Sandro Salvadore
- 1966–1977 Giacinto Facchetti
- 1977–1983 Dino Zoff
- 1984–1985 Marco Tardelli
- 1985–1986 Gaetano Scirea
- 1986–1987 Antonio Cabrini
- 1988–1991 Giuseppe Bergomi
- 1991–1994 Franco Baresi
- 1994–2002 Paolo Maldini
- 2002–2010 Fabio Cannavaro (Note: During UEFA Euro 2008, Alessandro Del Piero was named the Italian national team's acting captain, as Cannavaro was injured and unable to take part in the competition, however Gianluigi Buffon was often played as captain as Del Piero was frequently deployed as a substitute.)
- 2010–2018 Gianluigi Buffon (Note: Buffon served as second acting captain in UEFA Euro 2008 after Alessandro Del Piero was named the team's acting captain, as Cannavaro was injured and unable to take part in the competition, however Del Piero was frequently deployed as a substitute. Although Buffon was officially named Italy's new captain in 2010, following Cannavaro's retirement subsequent to the 2010 FIFA World Cup, Andrea Pirlo was named the Italian national team's acting captain after the tournament (while Daniele De Rossi was named the team's second acting captain), as Buffon was ruled out until the end of the year due to injury, and only made his first appearance as Italy's official captain on 9 February 2011, in a 1–1 friendly away draw against Germany.)
- 2018–2022 Giorgio Chiellini
- 2022–2023 Leonardo Bonucci
- 2023 Ciro Immobile
- 2024–present Gianluigi Donnarumma

==== Discipline ====
Most red cards
Giancarlo Antognoni, Leonardo Bonucci, Franco Causio and Daniele De Rossi, 2 each
First goalkeeper to be sent off at a FIFA World Cup
Gianluca Pagliuca, 1, 23 June 1994, 1–0 vs Norway

=== Managers ===
Most manager appearances
Enzo Bearzot, 104
Most FIFA World Cups coached in
Enzo Bearzot, 3
Most FIFA World Cup appearances as a manager
Enzo Bearzot, 18
Most FIFA World Cup matches won as a manager
Enzo Bearzot, 9
Most FIFA World Cup titles as a manager
Vittorio Pozzo, 2 (1934 and 1938)
Most UEFA European Championship appearances as a manager
Roberto Mancini, 7
Most UEFA European Championship matches won as a manager
Roberto Mancini, 5

== Team records ==
Venue most played in
Stadio Olimpico, 57
Largest victory
10–0 vs. United States, 4 April 1975
Largest official victory
9–0 vs. United States, 2 August 1948
Largest FIFA World Cup victory
7–1 vs. United States, 27 May 1934
Largest UEFA European Championship victory
3–0 vs. Turkey, 11 June 2021 and Switzerland, 16 June 2021
Largest defeat
1–7 vs. Hungary, 6 April 1924
Largest FIFA World Cup defeat
1–4 vs. Switzerland, 23 June 1954 and Brazil, 21 June 1970
Largest UEFA European Championship defeat
0–4 vs. Spain, 1 July 2012
Most total goals in a single match
11–3 vs. Egypt, 9 June 1928
Most goals scored in a single match
11–3 vs. Egypt, 9 June 1928
Most goals conceded in a single match
1–7 vs. Hungary, 6 April 1924
Most goals scored in a single edition of the World Cup
12, 1982 and 2006
Most goals scored in a single edition of the European Championship
13, 2020
Most goals scored in a single edition of a major international tournament
13, Euro 2020
Most consecutive victories
13, 11 November 2020 vs. Estonia – 2 July 2021 vs. Belgium
Most consecutive victories without conceding a goal
11, 11 November 2020 vs. Estonia – 20 June 2021 vs. Wales
Most consecutive away victories
6, 14 October 2018 vs. Poland – 15 November 2019 vs. Bosnia and Herzegovina
Most consecutive defeats
3, achieved twice, most recently 23 June 1974 vs. Poland – 20 November 1974 vs. Netherlands
Most consecutive matches without victory
8, 15 January 1958 vs. Northern Ireland – 29 November 1959 vs. Hungary
Most consecutive matches without defeat
37, 10 October 2018 vs. Ukraine – 8 September 2021 vs. Lithuania
Most consecutive draws
5, 8 June 1997 vs. Brazil – 29 October 1997 vs. Russia
Most consecutive matches without a draw
20, achieved twice, most recently 22 November 1975 vs. Netherlands – 25 January 1978 vs. Spain
Most consecutive matches with at least one goal scored
43, 20 May 1931 vs. Scotland – 31 October 1937 vs. Switzerland
Most consecutive matches with at least two goals scored
10, 23 March 2019 vs. Finland – 18 November 2019 vs. Armenia; 11 November 2020 vs. Estonia – 16 June 2021 vs. Switzerland
Most consecutive matches with no goals scored
3, achieved five times, most recently 10 November 2017 vs. Sweden – 23 March 2018 vs. Argentina
Most consecutive matches with at least one goal conceded
18, 31 January 1915 vs. Switzerland – 1 January 1923 vs. Germany
Most consecutive matches with no goals conceded
12, 7 October 1972 vs. Luxembourg – 8 June 1974 vs. Austria
Most minutes without conceding a goal
1,168
Most consecutive victories in a UEFA European Championship qualifying and final tournaments
15, 2020
Most victories in a single UEFA European Championship qualifying and final tournaments
15, 2020
Most consecutive victories in a single UEFA European Championship final tournament
5, 2020
Most victories in a single UEFA European Championship final tournament
5 (out of 7), 2020
Most victories in a single UEFA European Championship qualifying group
10 (out of 10), UEFA Euro 2020 qualifying
Highest percentage of victories in one calendar year
100%, 2019 (10 out of 10)
Most victories in one calendar year
12, 2021 (out of 17)
Most players scoring in a single match
7, 18 November 2019 vs. Armenia
