= Angelo Piccaluga =

Italian footballer (1906–1993)

Personal information
- Full name: Angelo Piccaluga
- Date of birth: 4 October 1906
- Place of birth: Vercelli, Italy
- Date of death: 7 March 1993 (aged 86)
- Place of death: San Desiderio di Calliano, Italy
- Position: Forward

Senior career*
Years	Team	Apps	(Gls)
1923–1927	Pro Vercelli	48	(11)
1927–1934	Modena	194	(46)
1934–1937	Palermo	50	(9)
1937–1938	Biellese	25	(7)

International career
1929	Italy	2	(0)

Managerial career
- 1943–1944: Casale
Medal record
Italy
Central European International Cup
Gold medal – first place	1927–30 Central European International Cup
- * Club domestic league appearances and goals

Angelo Piccaluga (Italian pronunciation: [ˈandʒelo pikkaˈluːɡa]; 6 October 1906 – 7 March 1993) was an Italian footballer, who played as a forward for Pro Vercelli, Modena F.C., U.S. Palermo, A.S. Biellese 1902, and the Italy national football team.

He played 2 matches for Italy being part of the successful 1927–30 Central European International Cup campaign.

== Honours ==
=== International ===
Italy

- Central European International Cup: 1927–30
