= Austria–Hungary football rivalry =

International football rivalry

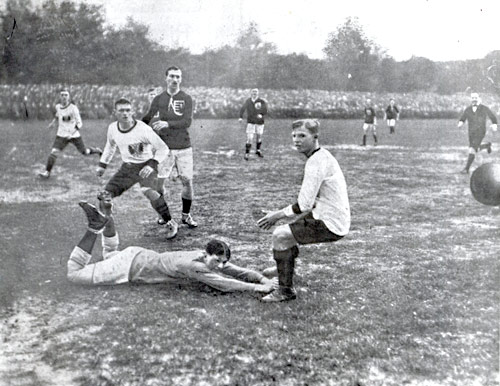
- Austria and Hungary clash in Vienna on 27 April 1913.
- Location: Europe (UEFA)
- Teams: Austria; Hungary
- First meeting: Austria 5–0 Hungary; Friendly; Vienna (12 October 1902)
- Latest meeting: Austria 0–2 Hungary; UEFA Euro 2016; Bordeaux (14 June 2016)

Statistics
- Total meetings: 137
- Most wins: Hungary (67)
- All-time series: Austria: 40; Draw: 30; Hungary: 67
- Largest victory: Austria 8–2 Hungary; Friendly; Vienna, Austria (27 April 1932)

The Austria–Hungary football rivalry is a sports rivalry that exists between the national football teams of the two countries, as well as their respective sets of fans. The match-up between Austria and Hungary is the second most-played international in football (only Argentina and Uruguay have met each other in more matches).

== Kit history ==
Austria

Hungary

Austria used to play in similar colours to those of the Germany national football team; white jerseys, black shorts, black socks (the Germans wear white ones). In order to distinguish themselves, in 2004 coach Hans Krankl switched to their former away shirts, which have the same colour scheme as Austria's flag, red-white-red. To further distinguish themselves from Germany, the Austrians had used an all-black away kit, but as of 2010, the white shirt and black shorts is used as the away kit.

Hungary's traditional home colours are cherry red shirts, white shorts and green socks (representing the Hungarian flag). However, the team sometimes wears all white kit even at home. The coat of arms are worn on the left side of the shirt, where the human heart can be found. The actual coat of arms could have always been found on the shirt of the national team in contrast with many other national teams which wear the logo of the football federation.

== Matches ==
#	Date	Competition	Venue	Home team	Score	Away team
1	12 October 1902	Friendly	WAC-Platz, Wien	Austria	5–0	Hungary
2	11 June 1903	Friendly	Margaret Island, Budapest	Hungary	3–2	Austria
3	11 October 1903	Friendly	WAC-Platz, Wien	Austria	4–2	Hungary
4	2 June 1904	Friendly	Millenáris Sporttelep, Budapest	Hungary	3–0	Austria
5	9 October 1904	Friendly	Cricketter-Platz, Wien	Austria	5–4	Hungary
6	9 April 1905	Friendly	Millenáris Sporttelep, Budapest	Hungary	1–1	Austria
7	4 November 1906	Friendly	Millenáris Sporttelep, Budapest	Hungary	3–1	Austria
8	5 May 1907	Friendly	Rudolfsheim Rapid-Platz, Wien	Austria	3–1	Hungary
9	3 November 1907	Friendly	Millenáris Sporttelep, Budapest	Hungary	4–1	Austria
10	3 May 1908	Friendly	Hohe Warte Stadium, Wien	Austria	4–0	Hungary
11	1 November 1908	Friendly	Millenáris Sporttelep, Budapest	Hungary	5–3	Austria
12	2 May 1909	Friendly	Cricketter-Platz, Wien	Austria	3–4	Hungary
13	30 May 1909	Friendly	Millenáris Sporttelep, Budapest	Hungary	1–1	Austria
14	11 November 1909	Friendly	Millenáris Sporttelep, Budapest	Hungary	2-2	Austria
15	1 May 1910	Friendly	Hohe Warte Stadium, Wien	Austria	2–1	Hungary
16	6 November 1910	Friendly	Millenáris Sporttelep, Budapest	Hungary	3–0	Austria
17	7 May 1911	Friendly	Hohe Warte Stadium, Wien	Austria	3–1	Hungary
18	5 November 1911	Friendly	Üllői úti Stadion, Budapest	Hungary	2–0	Austria
19	5 May 1912	Friendly	Hohe Warte Stadium, Wien	Austria	1-1	Hungary
20	5 July 1912	1912 Summer Olympics	Råsunda Stadium, Solna	Hungary	3–0	Austria
21	3 November 1912	Friendly	Üllői úti Stadion, Budapest	Hungary	4–0	Austria
22	27 April 1913	Friendly	WAC-Platz, Wien	Austria	1–4	Hungary
23	26 October 1913	Friendly	Hungária körúti stadion, Budapest	Hungary	4–3	Austria
24	3 May 1914	Friendly	WAC-Platz, Wien	Austria	2–0	Hungary
25	4 October 1914	Friendly	Üllői úti Stadion, Budapest	Hungary	2–2	Austria
26	8 November 1914	Friendly	WAC-Platz, Wien	Austria	1–2	Hungary
27	2 May 1915	Friendly	Hungária körúti stadion, Budapest	Hungary	2–5	Austria
28	30 May 1915	Friendly	WAC-Platz, Wien	Austria	1–2	Hungary
29	3 October 1915	Friendly	WAC-Platz, Wien	Austria	4–2	Hungary
30	7 November 1915	Friendly	Üllői úti Stadion, Budapest	Hungary	6–2	Austria
31	7 May 1916	Friendly	Hütteldorf WAF-Platz, Wien	Austria	3–1	Hungary
32	4 Jun 1916	Friendly	Hungária körúti stadion, Budapest	Hungary	2–1	Austria
33	1 October 1916	Friendly	Üllői úti Stadion, Budapest	Hungary	2–3	Austria
34	5 November 1916	Friendly	Hütteldorf WAF-Platz, Wien	Austria	3–3	Hungary
35	6 May 1917	Friendly	WAC-Platz, Wien	Austria	1–1	Hungary
36	3 Jun 1917	Friendly	Hungária körúti stadion, Budapest	Hungary	6–2	Austria
37	15 July 1917	Friendly	WAC-Platz, Wien	Austria	1–4	Hungary
38	7 October 1917	Friendly	Üllői úti Stadion, Budapest	Hungary	2–1	Austria
39	4 November 1917	Friendly	WAC-Platz, Wien	Austria	1–2	Hungary
40	14 April 1918	Friendly	Hungária körúti stadion, Budapest	Hungary	2–0	Austria
41	2 Jun 1918	Friendly	WAC-Platz, Wien	Austria	0-2	Hungary
42	6 October 1918	Friendly	WAC-Platz, Wien	Austria	0-3	Hungary
43	6 April 1919	Friendly	Üllői úti Stadion, Budapest	Hungary	2–1	Austria
44	5 October 1919	Friendly	WAC-Platz, Wien	Austria	2–0	Hungary
45	9 November 1919	Friendly	Hungária körúti stadion, Budapest	Hungary	3–2	Austria
46	2 May 1920	Friendly	WAC-Platz, Wien	Austria	2-2	Hungary
47	20 November 1920	Friendly	Hungária körúti stadion, Budapest	Hungary	1-2	Austria
48	24 April 1921	Friendly	Simmering-Platz, Wien	Austria	4-1	Hungary
49	30 April 1922	Friendly	Hungária körúti stadion, Budapest	Hungary	1-1	Austria
50	24 September 1922	Friendly	Hohe Warte Stadium, Wien	Austria	2–2	Hungary
51	26 November 1922	Friendly	Üllői úti Stadion, Budapest	Hungary	1-2	Austria
52	6 May 1923	Friendly	Hohe Warte Stadium, Wien	Austria	1-0	Hungary
53	23 September 1923	Friendly	Hungária körúti stadion, Budapest	Hungary	2-0	Austria
54	4 May 1924	Friendly	Hungária körúti stadion, Budapest	Hungary	2–2	Austria
55	14 September 1924	Friendly	Hohe Warte Stadium, Wien	Austria	2-1	Hungary
56	5 May 1925	Friendly	Hohe Warte Stadium, Wien	Austria	3-1	Hungary
57	20 September 1925	Friendly	Üllői úti Stadion, Budapest	Austria	1–1	Hungary
58	2 May 1926	Friendly	Hungária körúti stadion, Budapest	Hungary	0-3	Austria
59	19 September 1926	Friendly	Hohe Warte Stadium, Wien	Austria	2-3	Hungary
60	10 April 1927	Friendly	Hohe Warte Stadium, Wien	Austria	6-0	Hungary
61	25 September 1927	1927–30 Central European International Cup	Üllői úti Stadion, Budapest	Hungary	5-3	Austria
62	6 May 1928	Friendly	Hungária körúti stadion, Budapest	Hungary	5-5	Austria
63	7 October 1928	1927–30 Central European International Cup	Hohe Warte Stadium, Wien	Austria	5-1	Hungary
64	5 May 1929	Friendly	Hohe Warte Stadium, Wien	Austria	2-2	Hungary
65	6 October 1929	Friendly	Hungária körúti stadion, Budapest	Hungary	2-1	Austria
66	1 Jun 1930	Friendly	Hungária körúti stadion, Budapest	Hungary	2-1	Austria
67	21 September 1930	Friendly	Hohe Warte Stadium, Wien	Austria	2-3	Hungary
68	3 May 1931	1931–32 Central European International Cup	Hohe Warte Stadium, Wien	Austria	0-0	Hungary
69	4 October 1931	1931–32 Central European International Cup	Hungária körúti stadion, Budapest	Hungary	2-2	Austria
70	24 April 1932	Friendly	Hohe Warte Stadium, Wien	Austria	8-2	Hungary
71	2 October 1932	Friendly	Üllői úti Stadion, Budapest	Hungary	2-3	Austria
72	30 April 1933	Friendly	Üllői úti Stadion, Budapest	Hungary	1-1	Austria
73	1 October 1933	Friendly	Hohe Warte Stadium, Wien	Austria	2-2	Hungary
74	15 April 1934	Friendly	Hohe Warte Stadium, Wien	Austria	5-2	Hungary
75	31 May 1934	1934 FIFA World Cup	Stadio Renato Dall'Ara, Bologna	Austria	2-1	Hungary
76	7 October 1934	1933–35 Central European International Cup	Hungária körúti stadion, Budapest	Hungary	3-1	Austria
77	12 May 1935	Friendly	Üllői úti Stadion, Budapest	Hungary	6-3	Austria
78	6 October 1935	1933–35 Central European International Cup	Hohe Warte Stadium, Wien	Austria	4-4	Hungary
79	5 April 1936	Friendly	Hohe Warte Stadium, Wien	Austria	3-5	Hungary
80	27 September 1936	1936–38 Central European International Cup	Üllői úti Stadion, Budapest	Hungary	5-3	Austria
81	23 May 1937	Friendly	Üllői úti Stadion, Budapest	Hungary	2-2	Austria
82	10 October 1937	1936–38 Central European International Cup	Praterstadion, Wien	Austria	1-2	Hungary
83	19 August 1945	Friendly	Üllői úti Stadion, Budapest	Hungary	2-0	Austria
84	20 August 1945	Friendly	Üllői úti Stadion, Budapest	Hungary	5-2	Austria
85	14 April 1946	Friendly	Praterstadion, Wien	Austria	3-2	Hungary
86	6 October 1945	Friendly	Üllői úti Stadion, Budapest	Hungary	2-0	Austria
87	4 May 1947	Friendly	Üllői úti Stadion, Budapest	Hungary	5-2	Austria
88	14 September 1947	Friendly	Praterstadion, Wien	Austria	4-3	Hungary
89	2 May 1948	1948–53 Central European International Cup	Praterstadion, Wien	Austria	3-2	Hungary
90	3 October 1948	Friendly	Megyeri úti Stadion, Budapest	Hungary	2-1	Austria
91	8 May 1949	1948–53 Central European International Cup	Megyeri úti Stadion, Budapest	Hungary	6-1	Austria
92	16 October 1949	Friendly	Praterstadion, Wien	Austria	3-4	Hungary
93	14 May 1950	Friendly	Praterstadion, Wien	Austria	5-3	Hungary
94	29 October 1950	Friendly	Megyeri úti Stadion, Budapest	Hungary	4-3	Austria
95	26 April 1953	Friendly	Megyeri úti Stadion, Budapest	Hungary	1-1	Austria
96	11 October 1953	Friendly	Praterstadion, Wien	Austria	2-3	Hungary
97	11 April 1954	Friendly	Praterstadion, Wien	Austria	0-1	Hungary
98	14 November 1954	Friendly	Népstadion, Budapest	Hungary	4-1	Austria
99	24 April 1955	1955–59 Central European International Cup	Praterstadion, Wien	Austria	2-2	Hungary
100	16 October 1955	1955–59 Central European International Cup	Népstadion, Budapest	Hungary	6-1	Austria
101	14 October 1956	Friendly	Praterstadion, Wien	Austria	0-2	Hungary
102	20 November 1960	Friendly	Népstadion, Budapest	Hungary	2-0	Austria
103	11 Jun 1961	Friendly	Népstadion, Budapest	Hungary	1-2	Austria
104	8 October 1961	Friendly	Praterstadion, Wien	Austria	2-1	Hungary
105	24 Jun 1962	Friendly	Praterstadion, Wien	Austria	1-2	Hungary
106	28 October 1962	Friendly	Népstadion, Budapest	Hungary	2-0	Austria
107	27 October 1963	Friendly	Népstadion, Budapest	Hungary	2-1	Austria
108	3 May 1964	Friendly	Praterstadion, Wien	Austria	1-0	Hungary
109	13 Jun 1965	1966 FIFA World Cup qualification	Praterstadion, Wien	Austria	0-1	Hungary
110	5 September 1965	1966 FIFA World Cup qualification	Népstadion, Budapest	Hungary	3-0	Austria
111	30 October 1966	Friendly	Népstadion, Budapest	Hungary	3-1	Austria
112	7 September 1967	Friendly	Praterstadion, Wien	Austria	1-3	Hungary
113	27 September 1970	Friendly	Népstadion, Budapest	Hungary	1-1	Austria
114	4 April 1971	Friendly	Praterstadion, Wien	Austria	0-2	Hungary
115	15 October 1972	1974 FIFA World Cup qualification	Praterstadion, Wien	Austria	2-2	Hungary
116	29 April 1973	1974 FIFA World Cup qualification	Népstadion, Budapest	Hungary	2-2	Austria
117	28 September 1974	Friendly	Praterstadion, Wien	Austria	1-0	Hungary
118	2 April 1975	UEFA Euro 1976 qualifying	Praterstadion, Wien	Austria	0-0	Hungary
119	24 September 1975	UEFA Euro 1976 qualifying	Népstadion, Budapest	Hungary	2-1	Austria
120	12 Jun 1976	Friendly	Népstadion, Budapest	Hungary	2-0	Austria
121	13 October 1976	Friendly	Praterstadion, Wien	Austria	2-4	Hungary
122	26 September 1979	Friendly	Praterstadion, Wien	Austria	3-1	Hungary
123	4 Jun 1980	Friendly	Népstadion, Budapest	Hungary	1-1	Austria
124	8 October 1980	Friendly	Praterstadion, Wien	Austria	3-1	Hungary
125	24 March 1982	Friendly	Népstadion, Budapest	Hungary	2-3	Austria
126	26 September 1984	1986 FIFA World Cup qualification	Népstadion, Budapest	Hungary	3-1	Austria
127	17 April 1985	1986 FIFA World Cup qualification	Gerhard Hanappi Stadium, Wien	Austria	0-3	Hungary
128	17 May 1988	Friendly	Népstadion, Budapest	Hungary	0-4	Austria
129	31 August 1988	Friendly	Linzer Stadion, Linz	Austria	0-0	Hungary
130	11 April 1990	Friendly	Stadion Lehen, Salzburg	Austria	3-0	Hungary
131	25 March 1992	Friendly	Népstadion, Budapest	Hungary	2-1	Austria
132	23 March 1994	Friendly	Linzer Stadion, Linz	Austria	1-1	Hungary
133	24 April 1996	Friendly	Népstadion, Budapest	Hungary	0-2	Austria
134	25 March 1998	Friendly	Praterstadion, Wien	Austria	2-3	Hungary
135	16 August 2000	Friendly	Népstadion, Budapest	Hungary	1-1	Austria
136	16 August 2006	Friendly	UPC-Arena, Graz	Austria	1-2	Hungary
137	14 June 2016	UEFA Euro 2016	Nouveau Stade de Bordeaux, Bordeaux	Austria	0-2	Hungary

== See also ==
- Austria–Hungary relations
- Austria national football team
- Hungary national football team
- Hungary–Romania football rivalry
- Austria-Hungary
