= 1933 Mitropa Cup =

Tournament details
- Dates: 21 June – 8 September 1933
- Teams: 8

Final positions
- Champions: Austria Wien (1st title)
- Runners-up: (Italy) Ambrosiana Inter

Tournament statistics
- Matches played: 14
- Top scorer(s): (Czechoslovakia) František Kloz, (Austria) Matthias Sindelar, (Italy) Giuseppe Meazza, (Italy) Renato Cesarini (5 goals)

The 1933 season of the Mitropa Cup football club tournament was won by Austria Wien who defeated AS Ambrosiana Inter 4–3 on aggregate in the final. It was the third time that a team from Vienna won the tournament, but the first of two wins for FK Austria Wien. The two legs were played on 3 September in Arena Civica in Milan and 8 September in Prater Stadium. The second leg of the final was decided when the referee didn't convalidate a goal that would equalize the game from Giuseppe Meazza and shortly after that ejected Luigi Allemandi and Atilio Demaría that left Inter with 9 men.

The holders, AGC Bologna, had failed to qualify as one of the two Italian clubs. It was the last time that Ferencvárosi FC failed to qualify as one of the Hungarian clubs for the pre-war competition. This was the seventh edition of the tournament.

The accolade of top scorer was shared by four players who each scored five goals, Raimundo Orsi of semi-finalists Juventus, František Kloz of the other semi-finalists Sparta Prague, Giuseppe Meazza who scored one goal in each leg of the final for AS Ambrosiana Inter, and Matthias Sindelar who scored all three of FK Austria Wien's goals in the second leg of the final, the third, which was the winner, in the 88th minute.

== Quarterfinals ==
Team 1	Agg.	Team 2	1st leg	2nd leg
Újpest (Hungary)	4–10	(Italy) Juventus	2–4	2–6
Slavia Prague (Czechoslovakia)	3–4	Austria Wien	3–1	0–3
Hungária MTK (Hungary)	3–5	(Czechoslovakia) Sparta Prague	2–3	1–2
First Vienna (Austria)	1–4	(Italy) Ambrosiana Inter	1–0	0–4

== Semifinals ==
Team 1	Agg.	Team 2	1st leg	2nd leg
Ambrosiana Inter (Italy)	6–3	(Czechoslovakia) Sparta Prague	4–1	2–2
Austria Wien	4–1	(Italy) Juventus	3–0	1–1

== Finals ==
Team 1	Agg.	Team 2	1st leg	2nd leg
Ambrosiana Inter (Italy)	3–4	Austria Wien	2–1	1–3

3 September 1933

Ambrosiana Inter (Italy)	2–1	Austria Wien
Meazza 40'; Levratto 41'		Viertl 77'

Arena Civica, Milan
Attendance: 35,000
Referee: Ferenc Klug (Hungary)

9 September 1933

Austria Wien	3–1	(Italy) Ambrosiana Inter
Sindelar 45' (pen.), 80', 88'		Meazza 85'

Praterstadion, Vienna
Attendance: 58,000
Referee: František Cejnar (Czechoslovakia)

== Top goalscorers ==
Rank	Player	Team	Goals
1	(Austria) Matthias Sindelar	Austria Wien	5
1	(Italy) Giuseppe Meazza	(Italy) Ambrosiana Inter	5
1	(Czechoslovakia) František Kloz	(Czechoslovakia) Sparta Prague	5
1	(Italy) Raimundo Orsi	(Italy) Juventus	5
5	(Austria) Rudolf Viertl	Austria Wien	4
5	(Italy) Attilio Demaría	(Italy) Ambrosiana Inter	4

1933 Mitropa Cup Champions

Austria Wien
1st Title
