= Giuseppe Meazza =

Italian footballer (1910–1979)

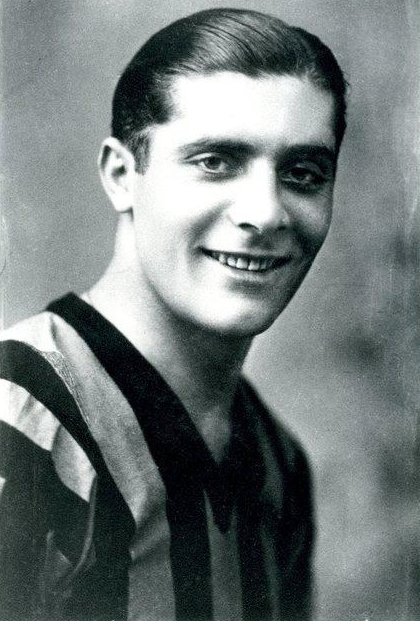
- Meazza during the 1934–1935 season with Ambrosiana

Personal information
- Date of birth: 23 August 1910
- Place of birth: Milan, Italy
- Date of death: 21 August 1979 (aged 68)
- Place of death: Lissone, Italy
- Height: 1.69 m (5 ft 7 in)
- Position: Forward

Youth career
- 1922–1924: Gloria
- 1924–1927: Inter Milan

Senior career*
Years	Team	Apps	(Gls)
1927–1940	Inter Milan	348	(240)
1940–1942	AC Milan	37	(9)
1942–1943	Juventus	27	(10)
1944	Varese	20	(7)
1945–1946	Atalanta	14	(2)
1946–1947	Inter Milan	17	(2)
Total		463	(270)

International career
1930–1939	Italy	53	(33)

Managerial career
- 1946: Atalanta
- 1946–1948: Inter Milan
- 1948–1949: Beşiktaş
- 1949–1951: Pro Patria
- 1952–1953: Italy Olympic
- 1955–1956: Inter Milan
- 1957: Inter Milan
Medal record
Men's Football
Representing Italy
FIFA World Cup
Winner	1934 Italy
Winner	1938 France
Central European International Cup
Winner	1927–30
Winner	1933–35
Runner-up	1931–32
- * Club domestic league appearances and goals

Giuseppe Meazza (Italian pronunciation: [dʒuˈzɛppe meˈattsa]; 23 August 1910 – 21 August 1979) was an Italian football manager and player. Throughout his career, he played mainly for Inter Milan in the 1930s, scoring 284 goals in 408 games for the club, and winning three Serie A titles, as well as the Coppa Italia; he later also played for two seasons for local rivals Milan, as well as Turin rivals Juventus for one season, in addition to his spells with Varese and Atalanta. At the international level, he led Italy to win two consecutive World Cups: in 1934 on home soil, and in 1938 as captain, being named to the All-star Team. He is widely regarded as one of the best players of the 20th century, and one of the greatest Italian strikers in the history of the sport.

Along with Giovanni Ferrari, Guido Masetti and Eraldo Monzeglio, he is one of only four Italian players to have won two World Cups. Following his retirement, he served as a coach for the Italy national team, and with several Italian clubs, including his former club sides Inter and Atalanta, as well as Pro Patria, and Turkish club Beşiktaş; he was Italy's head coach at the 1952 Summer Olympics.

Due to his technical skill, prolific goalscoring, and creative ability, he was often given the nickname Il genio (The Genius) by the Italian press during his career. He has been ranked the fourth-best player in the history of the World Cup. A prolific forward, Meazza won the Serie A top-scorer award on three occasions in his career; with 216 goals in Serie A, he is the fourth all-time highest goal scorer in Serie A, alongside José Altafini, and with 33 goals, he is also the second highest goalscorer for the Italy national team. With 338 goals, he is the third-highest Italian goalscorer in all competitions. He is also the youngest player ever to score 100 goals in Serie A, a feat which he achieved at the age of 23 years and 32 days. San Siro, the principal stadium in his native city of Milan, which is today shared by two of his former clubs, Inter Milan and crosstown rivals A.C. Milan, was named Stadio Giuseppe Meazza in the player's honour on 3 March 1980. In 2011, he was posthumously inducted into the Italian Football Hall of Fame. Throughout his career, including friendlies, Meazza scored 552 goals.

== Early life ==
Meazza was born in Porta Vittoria, Milan. Having lost his father in 1917 during the fighting of World War I at the age of seven, Peppe grew up in Milan with his mother, Ersilia who came from Mediglia, helping her sell fruit at the market. He began playing football at six years old, and started out playing barefoot with a ball made of rags on the streets for a team named the "Maestri Campionesi". At the age of twelve, his mother gave him permission to pursue a footballing career, and he began playing for Gloria F.C.. It was during this time that a fan gave Meazza his first pair of football boots.

At the age of 14, Meazza admired Milan, but was rejected by the team for his small physique. However, he was instead accepted by Milan's cross-city rivals Inter Milan.

Meazza's nickname, "il Balilla" ("The Little Boy"), was given to him in 1927 by his older teammate Leopoldo Conti, who thought "Peppìn", in Milanese dialect, who was only 17 when he joined the senior team, was too young to be associated to the senior team. He was surprised after Inter coach Árpád Weisz decided to give Meazza his debut for Inter in his place, commenting: "Now we even let the Balilla kids play!" The Opera Nazionale Balilla, the Fascist youth organisation which collected all children aged eight to 14 years, was established in 1926, hence why Conti felt it to be a suitable nickname for the young rookie. However, Meazza later scored two goals on his official debut, leaving Conti speechless.

== Club career ==
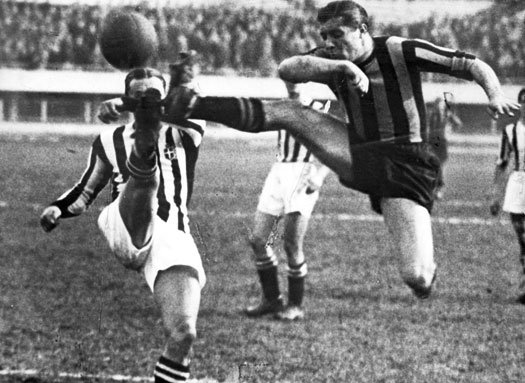
Giuseppe Meazza playing with Inter Milan

=== Inter ===
Meazza scored two goals on his professional debut, which came in a 6–2 win against Milanese Unione Sportiva in the Coppa Volta di Como, on 12 September 1927. The following day, the Italian sports newspaper La Gazzetta dello Sport praised his game as "intelligent, fresh, quick". Meazza still holds the record for the most goals scored in a debut season in Serie A, with 31 goals in his first season (1929–30). The next season, he scored five goals in a single game, twice in one season: 6 January 1929 Inter against Pistoiese 9–1 and 17 March 1929 Inter v Verona 9–0. That same season (1928–29) on 12 May 1929, he scored six goals as Inter beat Venezia 10–2. 27 April 1930 was the first time Inter ever played Roma in Milan. Inter won 6–0 and Meazza scored four goals, scoring his first three within three minutes of the game.

With Meazza in the squad, Inter won three national championships in 1930, 1938 and 1940, and helped win the team's first Coppa Italia in 1939. In the 1930 deciding game, he scored a second half hat-trick to tie the game against Genoa after Inter had been down 3–0. He was top-scorer of Serie A three times (1930, 1936, 1938), top-scorer in the pre-Serie A year of 1929 and top scorer of the Central European Cup three times: 1930 (seven goals), 1933 (five goals) and 1936 (ten goals); he finished with a runners-up medal in the competition in 1933.

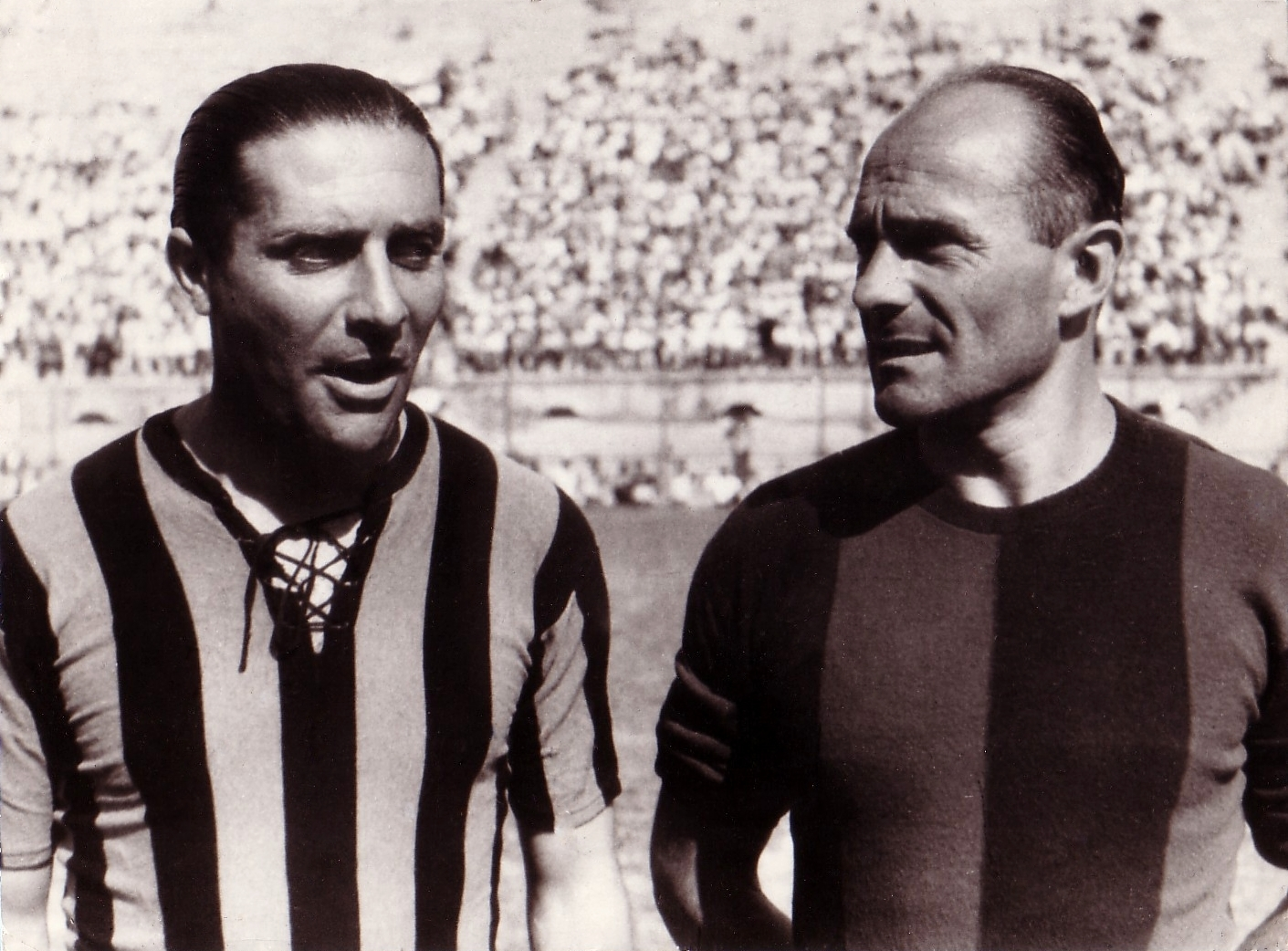
Giuseppe Meazza with Amedeo Biavati

When Ambrosiana beat Bari in the 1937–38 championship, he scored five goals in a 9–2 victory. The next week he scored a hat-trick against Lucchese. Along with fellow Inter players Ferraris II, Ferrari and Locatelli, Meazza was involved in the Azzurri set-up that won the 1938 World Cup in Paris. That same year, Inter won their fourth Scudetto, while the club's first Coppa Italia success came in 1939.

=== AC Milan and later career ===
An injury put him out of action for most of 1938–39 and 1939–40, and after having devoted the best part of his career to Inter, Meazza transferred to AC Milan on 28 November 1940. Later in his career he also played for Juventus, Varese and Atalanta. His debut for Juventus, on 18 October 1942, took place in the derby against Torino. This was the last season in which he managed to record double figures in terms of goals scored, helping Juventus to a third–place finish in the league. Following this season the Serie A and Coppa Italia were suspended due to the World War II.

=== Return to Inter ===
In 1946 he was recalled to Inter as a player-coach. He played 17 games, scoring the last two goals of his career to help an Inter team that was in danger of relegation.

== International career ==
Meazza played for Italy national team in the 1934 and 1938 World Cups, both of which Italy won. Apart from captaining the World Cup winning team in 1938, Meazza, along with Giovanni Ferrari and Eraldo Monzeglio, also set a record for being one of the only three Italian players to win two World Cups.

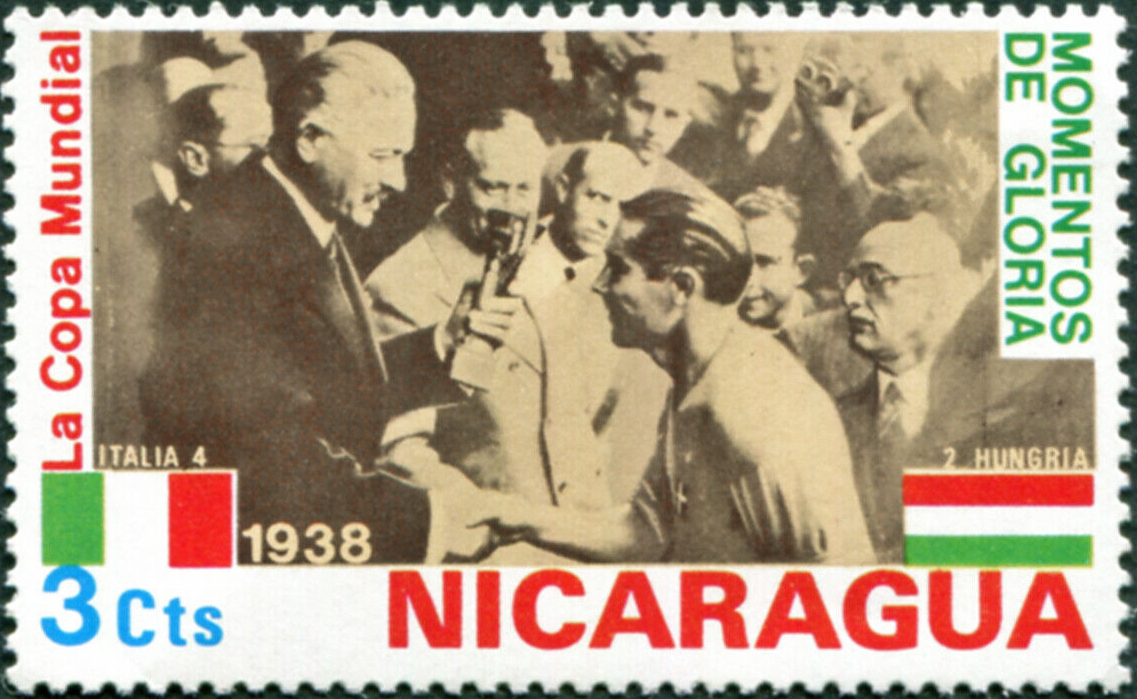
Meazza receives the 1938 World Cup from Albert Lebrun.

=== Early career ===
His debut with the Italy national team was in Rome on 9 February 1930 against Switzerland. Then 19-year-old, Meazza scored twice in that game (in the 37th and 39th minutes) to help Italy to a 4–2 victory after they had been down by two goals in only 19 minutes. The next game Italy played was on 2 March 1930 against Germany in Frankfurt, where Meazza scored a goal in a 2–0 win. A few months later, on 11 May 1930, he scored a hat-trick in a 5–0 game as Italy beat Hungary of Markos, Hirzer and Titkos for the first time ever while playing in Budapest. Meazza helped Italy win the Central European International Cup that year; the cup was a three-year international tournament between the strongest national teams of central and eastern Europe.

On 25 January 1931, Meazza scored another three goals in a 5–0 friendly win against France. He also scored two goals in the 1931–32 Central European International Cup campaign, in which Italy finished in second place.

His first fifteen caps were at centre-forward, but in 1933, he showed his versatility during a 3–1 victory over Germany in Bologna, when he was moved to an inside-right position by the Italian coach Vittorio Pozzo, to accommodate teammate Angelo Schiavio, a switch that would help Italy win the World Cup the next year as the goals flowed in. During the tournament, Meazza once again demonstrated his adaptability when he was switched to an inside-left.

=== 1934 FIFA World Cup ===
In the 1934 World Cup, which was hosted by Italy, Meazza appeared in every game for the Italians. On 25 March 1934 in Milan, Italy beat Greece 4–0 in a qualifying match with two goals coming from Meazza. He then scored the final goal in their 7–1 victory over the United States in the 89th minute of their World Cup opener. In the game against Spain, Giovanni Ferrari scored a goal against Ricardo Zamora. The game ended 1–1 and had to be settled the next day. Meazza scored from a corner sent in by Raimundo Orsi in the 11th minute. It was the only goal of the game.

The final against Czechoslovakia in Rome's Stadio Nazionale PNF. After 90 minutes, the two teams were at 1–1. Italy, though, was in far more trouble as the game went into extra-time until Meazza became the inspirer again. His injury became a mixed blessing as the Czechs did not bother to mark him and he made them rue that decision. In the 5th minute of extra time, Schiavio hit a snap-shot past goalkeeper Frantisek Planicka for the winner. Meazza was elected into the All-Star Team of the tournament and won the Golden Ball, the award presented to the best player at each FIFA World Cup finals.

=== 1933–35 Central European International Cup ===
In 1935 he claimed the Central European International Cup again. Alongside Eraldo Monzeglio, Raimundo Orsi, Raffaele Costantino, Alfredo Pitto, Umberto Caligaris, Luigi Allemandi, Virginio Rosetta & Gianpiero Combi, Meazza is one of only nine (all Italian) players to win two editions of the Central European International Cup (1927–30 and 1933–35); he also finished as the runner-up once with Italy (1931–32), thereby winning two gold medals and a silver medal before the tournament was discontinued due to the Anschluss. He holds the all-time record for appearances and goals, sixteen and eight respectively, at Central European International Cup tournaments for the Italy national side. With 8 goals, he is among the all-time top goal scorers in the competition's history.

=== 1938 FIFA World Cup and later career ===
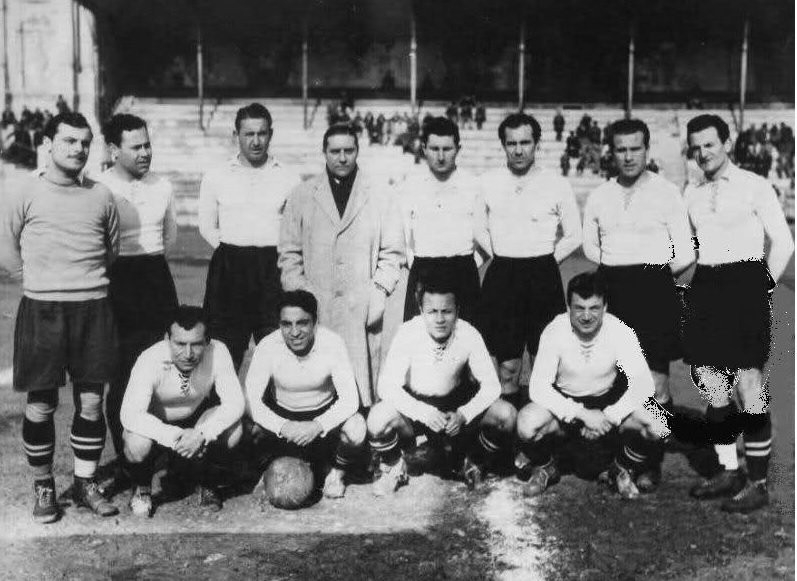
1948-49 Beşiktaş JK squad.

In the 1938 World Cup hosted by France, Meazza captained Italy, again playing in every match. In the semi-final against Brazil, with the score at 1–0 Italy were awarded a penalty after Silvio Piola was fouled by Domingos da Guia. As Meazza stepped up to take the kick, with a chance to double his team's lead, his shorts fell down, as the elastic in them had ripped; he held them up with his left hand, but he still managed to score, beating the Brazilian goalkeeper Walter from the spot by placing the ball into the corner. The goal enabled Italy to win the match 2–1 and sent them into their second consecutive World Cup final.

In the final, the Italians faced Hungary. Meazza set up goals for Silvio Piola and Gino Colaussi before halftime. The first assist he gave came after a quick exchange with Colaussi, who put Italy up 1–0. The next assist came after he faked a shot, making his defender jump past him, and dribbled past another defender, before sending in a quick pass on the ground for Piola to score. Ten minutes before halftime, after another quick exchange between Ferrari and Meazza, the latter found the unmarked Colaussi with a pass, and the winger netted his second of the game to make it 3–1 at the break. After the tournament, Piola, who scored five goals in France, paid his colleague the compliment of being responsible for his own good performance: "At the FIFA World Cup, I mainly lived off Meazza and Ferrari".

He played his last match for the national team nine years after his debut, on 20 July 1939 at the Olympiastadion in Helsinki, when he captained Italy to a 3–2 win over Finland. In total, he played 53 times with Italy between 1930 and 1939, losing only six matches, and scoring 33 goals; he is currently Italy's second highest goalscorer, behind Luigi Riva.

== Player profile ==
=== Style of play ===
"I also saw Pelé playing. He did not achieve Meazza's elegant style of playing. One day, at the Arena, I witnessed him doing something astonishing: he stopped the ball with a bicycle kick, elevating himself two meters from the ground. Then he landed with the ball glued at his foot, dribbled over an astonished defender, and then went on scoring a goal with one of his hallmark shots, sardonic and accurate to the millimeter."

— Luigi Veronelli

Although he was initially deployed as full-back in his youth, Meazza began his professional career as an all out striker or centre forward, but he later played for more than half of his career as a creative inside left forward, known as the mezzala role in Italian football jargon, although he was also capable of playing on the right. He further demonstrated his skill and creative ability by also becoming an accomplished attacking midfielder, and even played as a central midfielder or as a deep-lying playmaker in his later career. He was known for his excellent shooting ability and intoxicating dribbling skills, with an eye for the final pass. Despite his average height and slight yet stocky build, he was also an exceptional header of the ball and was known for his acrobatic abilities in the air. Beyond his qualities as a player, he was also a great leader on the pitch.

Meazza was the first Italian football player who became famous worldwide and was the first player with personal sponsors. Unlike his more reserved friend, international teammate, and club rival Silvio Piola, a player with whom Meazza was often compared, he was known for having a much more flamboyant character both on and off the pitch. He loved cabriolet, champagne, and women, and was the only player on the national team that was allowed to smoke. Meazza was famous for humiliating the best defenders of the era and for sleeping at a brothel the night before a match. Not known for having a particularly high work rate, sometimes he would not get out of bed until his teammates were already finished training. He also loved the Tango, and used this proficiency to make him unpredictable on the field and could score goals at fox-trot tempo.

Meazza was said to have exceptional dribbling skills, acceleration, and air sense, despite his physique. He used his dribbling to create goal-scoring chances for other players, while being a goalscorer himself. He was renowned for his famous "dead leaf" ("a foglia morta") free-kicks skill that gave the ball a curving trajectory. He was a two-footed offensive playmaker with passing abilities, good vision, ball control, and agility.

His trademark goals were ones where he would collect the ball at the half-line, dribble through several opponents with a series of twinkle-toed shuffles, and turns, until arriving in front of the goal, where he would stop and invite the goalkeeper to attack him like a matador, before faking a shot, then dribbling past the beaten goalkeeper to slot home easily. In away games, the defenders would often foul and hack him to avoid being humiliated. "Gol alla Meazza" and "finte alla Meazza" have since become popular sayings for Italian football fans to describe a truly inspiring goal off the dribble or a series of jukes. His goals "ad invito", where he would invite the goalkeeper out before dribbling around him is yet another popular saying. An accurate penalty taker, Meazza once said, "There is nothing worse than having a penalty kick saved by a keeper who didn't understand the fake."

=== Reception ===
Vittorio Pozzo, the mastermind coach behind both Italian World Cup victories, wrote of Meazza: "He was a born forward. He saw the game, understood the situation, distributed the ball carefully and made the team offence operate. Having him on the team was like starting the game 1–0 up."

Sports journalist Gianni Brera, who considered Meazza to be the greatest footballer in the history of the game, called him "Il Folber", and dubbed his style of play the "fasso-tuto-mi", because he considered him to be the complete central midfielder and a nimble acrobat. When describing Meazza, Brera said: "He was only Italian that stood out amongst the sensational Brazilians and Argentines". Following Meazza's death in 1979, Brera also added: "The world was full of great football players, maybe some even tougher and more consistent than him, but to us it seemed that one could not go beyond his sudden inventions, his ingenious runs, his peremptory yet never condescending dribbling, his solo break-away runs towards the usual stray victim, the opposing goalkeeper."

Peppino Prisco, who became vice-president of Inter Milan in 1963 and won every major trophy possible with the club, also considered Meazza to be the best player of all time, and said of him: "Meazza was great, unbeatable, even if he would occasionally run into a frightful crisis, caused by his intense sexual activity and his passion for the game. When he took over on the field, he did things that left the mouth ajar."

Bruno Arcari IV, who played with Meazza in A.C. Milan as well as became a coach afterwards, said that Meazza used to play without following any specific tactics, and his success on the field within the penalty area was due to his outstanding technique, which is similar to that of Pelé."

== Death ==
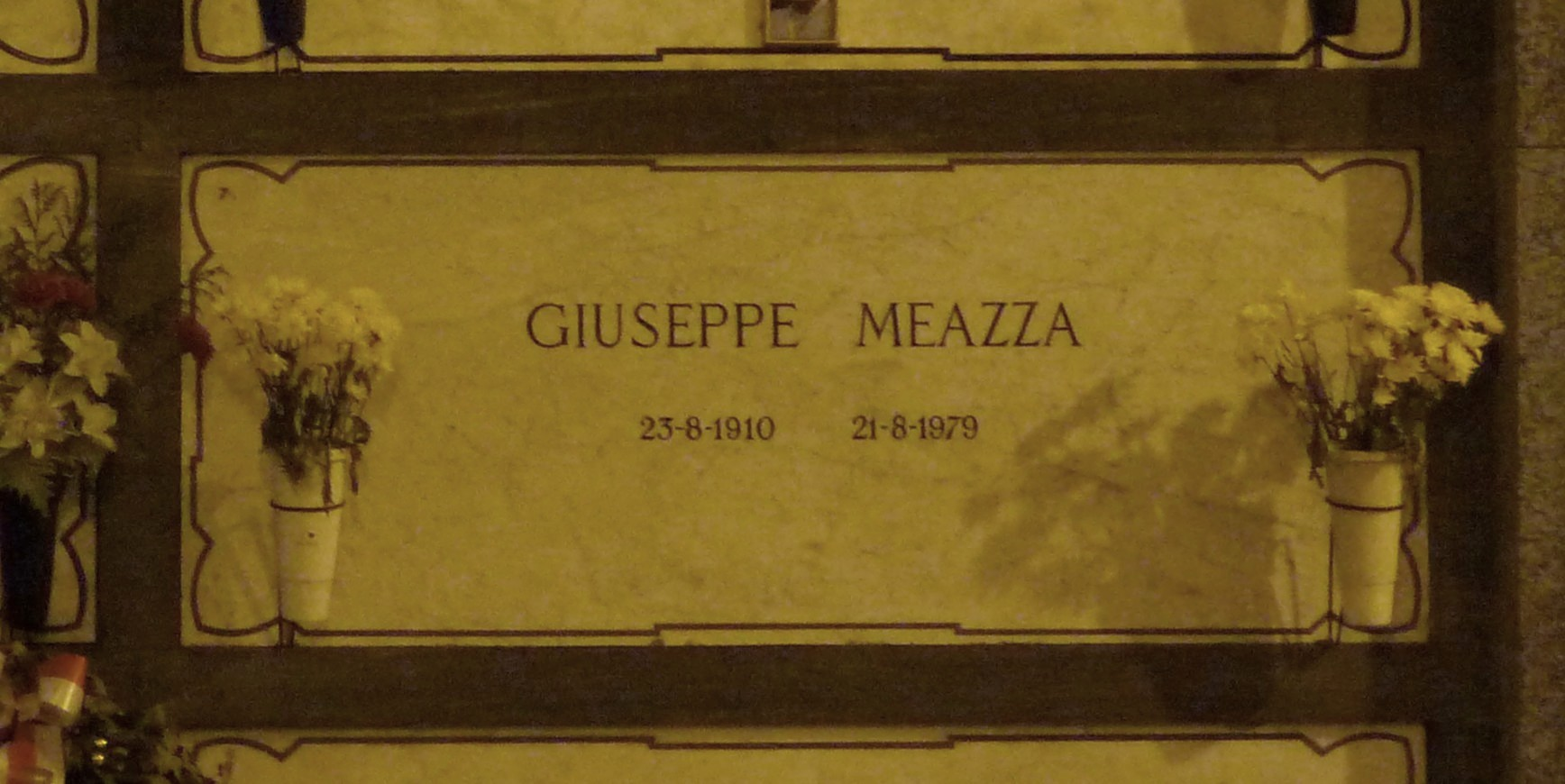
Meazza's grave at the Monumental Cemetery of Milan in 2015

Meazza died on 21 August 1979 of pancreas failure in Lissone, Italy, two days before his 69th birthday. He is buried at the Monumental Cemetery of Milan.

== Career statistics ==
=== Club ===
Appearances and goals by club, season and competition
Season	Club	League			Cup		Europe		Other		Total	
Season	Club	Division	Apps	Goals	Apps	Goals	Apps	Goals	Apps	Goals	Apps	Goals
Inter Milan	1927–28	Divisione Nazionale	33	12							33	12
Inter Milan	1928–29	Divisione Nazionale	29	33					1	0	30	33
Inter Milan	1929–30	Serie A	33	31					6	7	39	38
Inter Milan	1930–31	Serie A	34	24							34	24
Inter Milan	1931–32	Serie A	28	21							28	21
Inter Milan	1932–33	Serie A	32	20							32	20
Inter Milan	1933–34	Serie A	32	21					6	5	38	26
Inter Milan	1934–35	Serie A	30	19					2	3	32	22
Inter Milan	1935–36	Serie A	29	25	2	1			2	2	33	28
Inter Milan	1936–37	Serie A	26	11	4	3			6	10	36	24
Inter Milan	1937–38	Serie A	26	20	4	8					30	28
Inter Milan	1938–39	Serie A	16	4	6	0			4	2	26	6
Inter Milan	1939–40	Serie A	0	0					1	0	1	0
Inter Milan	Total		348	240	16	12			28	29	391	282
Milan	1940–41	Serie A	14	6	1	0					15	6
Milan	1941–42	Serie A	23	3	4	2					27	5
Juventus	1942–43	Serie A	27	10							27	10
Varese	1944	Alta Italia	20	7							20	7
Atalanta	1945–46	Divisione Nazionale	14	2							14	2
Inter Milan	1946–47	Serie A	17	2							17	2
Career total			463	270	21	14			28	29	511	314

=== International ===
Appearances and goals by national team and year
National team	Year	Apps	Goals
Italy	1930	5	6
Italy	1931	6	5
Italy	1932	4	2
Italy	1933	5	5
Italy	1934	9	7
Italy	1935	3	2
Italy	1936	4	2
Italy	1937	5	1
Italy	1938	6	3
Italy	1939	6	0
Total		53	33

Scores and results list Italy's goal tally first, the score column indicates the score after each Meazza goal.

List of international goals scored by Giuseppe Meazza
No.	Date	Venue	Opponent	Score	Result	Competition
1	9 February 1930	Stadio Nazionale PNF, Rome, Italy	Switzerland	3–2	4–2	Friendly
2	9 February 1930	Stadio Nazionale PNF, Rome, Italy	Switzerland	4–2	4–2	Friendly
3	2 March 1930	Waldstadion, Frankfurt, Germany	Germany	2–0	2–0	Friendly
4	11 May 1930	Üllői úti stadion, Budapest, Hungary	Hungary	1–0	5–0	1927-30 Central European International Cup
5	11 May 1930	Üllői úti stadion, Budapest, Hungary	Hungary	2–0	5–0	1927-30 Central European International Cup
6	11 May 1930	Üllői úti stadion, Budapest, Hungary	Hungary	3–0	5–0	1927-30 Central European International Cup
7	25 January 1931	Stadio Littoriale, Bologna, Italy	France	1–0	5–0	Friendly
8	25 January 1931	Stadio Littoriale, Bologna, Italy	France	2–0	5–0	Friendly
9	25 January 1931	Stadio Littoriale, Bologna, Italy	France	3–0	5–0	Friendly
10	22 February 1931	San Siro, Milan, Italy	Austria	1–1	2–1	1931-32 Central European International Cup
11	20 May 1931	Stadio Nazionale PNF, Rome, Italy	Scotland	2–0	3–0	Friendly
12	20 March 1932	Praterstadion, Vienna, Austria	Austria	1–0	1–2	1931-32 Central European International Cup
13	27 November 1932	San Siro, Milan, Italy	Hungary	3–1	4–2	Friendly
14	1 January 1933	Stadio Littoriale, Bologna, Italy	Germany	1–1	3–1	Friendly
15	12 February 1933	King Baudouin Stadium, Brussels, Belgium	Belgium	1–0	3–2	Friendly
16	12 February 1933	King Baudouin Stadium, Brussels, Belgium	Belgium	3–2	3–2	Friendly
17	2 April 1933	Charmilles Stadium, Geneva, Switzerland	Switzerland	3–0	3–0	1933-35 Central European International Cup
18	3 December 1933	Stadio Comunale, Florence, Italy	Switzerland	1–0	5–2	1933-35 Central European International Cup
19	25 March 1934	San Siro, Milan, Italy	Greece	2–0	4–0	1934 FIFA World Cup qualifier
20	25 March 1934	San Siro, Milan, Italy	Greece	4–0	4–0	1934 FIFA World Cup qualifier
21	27 May 1934	Stadio Nazionale PNF, Rome, Italy	United States	7–1	7–1	1934 FIFA World Cup
22	1 June 1934	Stadio Comunale, Florence, Italy	Spain	1–0	1–0	1934 FIFA World Cup
23	14 November 1934	Highbury stadium, London, England	England	1–3	2–3	Friendly
24	14 November 1934	Highbury stadium, London, England	England	2–3	2–3	Friendly
25	9 December 1934	San Siro, Milan, Italy	Hungary	4–2	4–2	Friendly
26	17 February 1935	Stadio Nazionale PNF, Rome, Italy	France	1–0	2–1	Friendly
27	17 February 1935	Stadio Nazionale PNF, Rome, Italy	France	2–0	2–1	Friendly
28	31 May 1936	Hungária körúti stadion, Budapest, Hungary	Hungary	2–1	2–1	Friendly
29	25 October 1936	San Siro, Milan, Italy	Switzerland	1–0	4–2	1936-38 Central European International Cup
30	27 May 1937	Ullevaal Stadion, Oslo, Norway	Norway	1–0	3–1	Friendly
31	15 May 1938	San Siro, Milan, Italy	Belgium	1–1	6–1	Friendly
32	22 May 1938	Stadio Luigi Ferraris, Genoa, Italy	Yugoslavia	3–0	4–0	Friendly
33	16 June 1938	Stade Vélodrome, Marseille, France	Brazil	2–0	2–1	1938 FIFA World Cup

== Honours ==
Inter Milan

- Serie A: 1929–30, 1937–38, 1939–40
- Coppa Italia: 1938–39

Italy

- FIFA World Cup: 1934, 1938
- Central European International Cup: 1927–30, 1933–35; runner-up: 1931-32

Beşiktaş

- Istanbul Football League runner-up: 1948–49

Individual

- Serie A top goalscorer: 1929–30, 1935–36, 1937–38
- Mitropa Cup top goalscorer: 1930, 1933, 1936
- FIFA World Cup Golden Ball: 1934
- FIFA World Cup All-Star Team: 1938
- International Football Hall of Champions: Inducted in 2001
- Inducted into the Italian Football Hall of Fame (posthumous honour, 2011)
- Inducted into the Walk of Fame of Italian sport: 2015
- Inter Milan Hall of Fame: 2019
- Guerin Sportivo Player of the Century (posthumous honour, 1999): 5th

== Trivia ==
- Meazza was one of the first Italians to coach abroad, coaching Beşiktaş J.K. of Turkey in 1948–49.
- While serving as a youth coach for Inter, he met Sandro Mazzola. Understanding the boy's pain at losing a father while so young and recognising his skills, Meazza took young Sandro under his wing, and convinced him to sign for Inter. This is however controversial, as the honour of having brought Sandro and his brother Ferruccio Mazzola to Inter is also attributed to an Inter player of the time, Benito "Veleno" Lorenzi, who was a friend and fellow Italian international to the boys' father, Torino legend Valentino Mazzola.
- Meazza is a FIFA Hall of Champions Inductee and Italian Football Hall of Fame Entrant. He was selected by IFFHS/FIFA as the 2nd Best Italian player as one of the best 25 World Players of the 20th Century, and was also selected to Italy's Sports Walk of Fame in 2015.
- Meazza is still today the joint-fourth top-scorer ever in Serie A along with José Altafini.
- Many Italian football experts, including Alberto Giocattoli, consider him to be the best player ever, and even Silvio Piola was quoted saying: "He is, without a doubt, one of the greatest Italian footballers ever. He is a symbol to our great country and we should cherish him."
- With 33 goals, Meazza remains of the Italy national team its second highest scorer. His record stood until Gigi Riva tied and eventually broke it on 9 June 1973, also in a game against Brazil. On that day, Meazza was quoted as saying, "That Riva is good, he scored a lot of goals against Cyprus and Turkey. Surely my goals were much more important."
- The San Siro stadium of Milan, which hosts two of Meazza's former clubs, Inter Milan and A.C. Milan, was renamed the Stadio Giuseppe Meazza in his honour.
