= Giuseppe Rosetti =

Italian footballer (1899–1965)

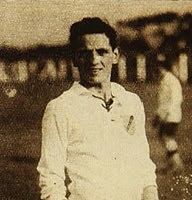
- Rosetti playing for Colo-Colo in 1920s.

Personal information
- Date of birth: 17 March 1899
- Place of birth: Spezia, Italy
- Date of death: 12 June 1965 (aged 66)
- Place of death: Spezia, Italy
- Height: 1.70 m (5 ft 7 in)
- Position: Midfielder

Senior career*
Years	Team	Apps	(Gls)
1921–1924	Spezia	68	(6)
1924–1925	Mantova	7	(0)
1925–1926	Audax Italiano	21	(8)
1926–1927	Colo-Colo	18	(5)
1927–1929	Torino	29	(0)
Total		143	(19)

Managerial career
- 1926: Chile
- 1927: Colo-Colo
- 1929–1932: Macerata
- 1941–1942: Macerata
- 1945–1946: Ausonia Calcio
- 1948–1949: Maceratese 1922
- 1952–1953: Spezia
- * Club domestic league appearances and goals

Giuseppe Rosetti (17 April 1899 – 12 June 1965) was an Italian footballer and manager who played as a midfielder.

He was commonly known as Rosetti I to distinguish him from his brother Gino, also a footballer.
