= Adolfo Baloncieri =

Italian footballer and manager (1897–1986)

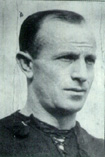

Personal information
- Date of birth: 27 July 1897
- Place of birth: Alessandria, Italy
- Date of death: 23 July 1986 (aged 88)
- Place of death: Genoa, Italy
- Position: Attacking midfielder

Youth career
- US Alessandria

Senior career*
Years	Team	Apps	(Gls)
1919–1925	US Alessandria	120	(74)
1925–1932	Torino	192	(97)
1932–1933	Comense	3	(0)
1943–1944	US Alessandria	1	(0)

International career
1920–1930	Italy	47	(25)

Managerial career
- 1931–1932: Torino (assistant)
- 1932–1933: Comense
- 1934–1936: Milan
- 1936–1937: Novara
- 1937–1939: Liguria
- 1939–1940: Napoli
- 1941–1945: Alessandria
- 1945–1946: Milan
- 1946–1947: Chiasso
- 1947–1950: Sampdoria
- 1950: Roma
- 1951–1952: Chiasso
- 1954–1955: Palermo
- 1961–1962: Chiasso
Medal record
Italy
Summer Olympics
Bronze medal – third place	1928 Amsterdam
Central European International Cup
Gold medal – first place	1927–30 Central European International Cup
- * Club domestic league appearances and goals

Adolfo Baloncieri (Italian pronunciation: [aˈdolfo balonˈtʃɛːri]; 27 July 1897 – 23 July 1986) was an Italian football manager and former player who played as a midfielder.

Critically regarded as one of the greatest footballers of all time, Gianni Brera considered him one of the greatest Italian playmakers ever, alongside the likes of Giuseppe Meazza and Valentino Mazzola. In 2010, Carlo Felice Chiesa wrote: "If it were possible to rank all-time great "registas" of world football, Adolfo Baloncieri, an athlete from a period so remote from our own, would end up among the first, if not first." Baloncieri began his club career with Alessandria, but most notably played for Torino, where they won league titles in 1927 and 1928 (the 1927 title was later revoked). Following his retirement, he also coached several clubs in Italy.

At international level, he took part at three editions of the Summer Olympic Games with Italy, captaining the Italy national team to a bronze medal at the 1928 Summer Olympics, and also won the 1927–1930 Central European International Cup with Italy. With 25 goals, he is the sixth-highest all-time scorer of the Italy national team, alongside Filippo Inzaghi and Alessandro Altobelli, and he is also the highest scoring midfielder in the history of the Italy national side.

== Early life ==
Baloncieri was born in Castelceriolo in the province of Alessandria, to a family originally from Caselle Torinese. During childhood, he lived with his family in Rosario, Argentina for 12 years where he entered the world of football at age nine. Eager to play sport, he did not complete his studies in accountancy.

His older brother Mario was an amateur footballer in Alessandria and then a reporter, while his cousin William Brezzi, who died at a young age, was his teammate at Alessandria and the national team. His brother Carlo drowned in Finale Ligure in August 1933, while his son also died at a young age. With his other daughter, Flora, a teacher, and a sister, he lived in Genoa in later years. He died in 1986, four days before he turned 89, from pneumonia.

== Club career ==
After spending much of his childhood in Argentina, Baloncieri returned to Italy in 1913 and joined Alessandria; for which he debuted in 1914 at the age of 17 before World War I suspended league fixtures. During the conflict he was at the front as a gunner. After football resumed he distinguished himself among the most famous footballers of the 1920s with Torino, when they won two national titles (one was revoked for the "Allemandi Case"). In 1930, he was knighted by the Crown of Italy on the recommendation of the Italian Football Federation's Leandro Arpinati. Baloncieri retired in 1931; interested in the development of young athletes, he was responsible for the development of the Torino youth system. He later became a manager.

== International career ==
At International level, Baloncieri was the captain of the Italy national team that won the bronze medal at the 1928 Olympic Games, and the winner of the 1930 Coppa Internazionale, alongside Giuseppe Meazza. He earned 47 caps for Italy between 1920 and 1930, and with 25 goals, he is Italy's sixth all-time highest goalscorer and the highest scoring midfielder in the history of the Italy national team. He also played in two other editions of the Olympics, in 1920 and 1924, making him the player with the most all-time appearances and goals, eleven and eight respectively, at Olympic football tournaments for the Italy national side.

== Style of play ==
Usually deployed as an offensive playmaker, Baloncieri had technical skills, vision, passing ability, and a notable eye for goal from midfield.

== Career statistics ==
Scores and results list Italy's goal tally first, score column indicates score after each Baloncieri goal.

List of international goals scored by Adolfo Baloncieri
No.	Date	Venue	Opponent	Score	Result	Competition	Ref.
1	28 August 1920	Jules Ottenstadion, Ghent, Belgium	Egypt	1–0	2–1	1920 Summer Olympics	
2	26 February 1922	Motovelodromo, Turin, Italy	Czechoslovakia	1–0	1–1	Friendly	
3	21 May 1922	Milan, Italy	Belgium	1–0	4–2	Friendly	
4	21 May 1922	Milan, Italy	Belgium	3–1	4–2	Friendly	
5	29 May 1924	Stade Pershing, Paris, France	Luxembourg	1–0	2–0	1924 Summer Olympics	
6	22 March 1925	Stadio di Corso Marsiglia, Turin, Italy	France	2–0	7–0	Friendly	
7	22 March 1925	Stadio di Corso Marsiglia, Turin, Italy	France	4–0	7–0	Friendly	
8	21 March 1926	Motovelodromo, Turin, Italy	Ireland (FAIFS)	1–0	3–0	Friendly	
9	30 January 1927	Stade de Genève, Lancy, Switzerland	Switzerland	1–0	5–1	Friendly	
10	30 January 1927	Stade de Genève, Lancy, Switzerland	Switzerland	3–0	5–1	Friendly	
11	30 January 1927	Stade de Genève, Lancy, Switzerland	Switzerland	5–1	5–1	Friendly	
12	20 February 1927	San Siro, Milan, Italy	Czechoslovakia	2–2	2–2	Friendly	
13	17 April 1927	Campo Turin, Turin, Italy	Portugal	2–0	3–1	Friendly	
14	29 May 1927	Stadio Littoriale, Bologna, Italy	Spain	1–0	2–0	Friendly	
15	29 May 1928	Olympic Stadium, Amsterdam, Netherlands	France	4–2	4–3	1928 Summer Olympics	
16	1 June 1928	Olympic Stadium, Amsterdam, Netherlands	Spain	1–1	1–1	1928 Summer Olympics	
17	4 June 1928	Olympic Stadium, Amsterdam, Netherlands	Spain	3–0	7–1	1928 Summer Olympics	
18	7 June 1928	Olympic Stadium, Amsterdam, Netherlands	Uruguay	1–0	2–3	1928 Summer Olympics	
19	10 June 1928	Olympic Stadium, Amsterdam, Netherlands	Egypt	2–1	11–3	1928 Summer Olympics	
20	10 June 1928	Olympic Stadium, Amsterdam, Netherlands	Egypt	7–2	11–3	1928 Summer Olympics	
21	14 October 1928	Utogrund, Zürich, Switzerland	Switzerland	3–1	3–2	1927–30 Central European International Cup	
22	2 December 1928	San Siro, Milan, Italy	Netherlands	3–2	3–2	Friendly	
23	1 December 1929	San Siro, Milan, Italy	Portugal	4–1	6–1	Friendly	
24	2 March 1930	Waldstadion, Frankfurt, Germany	Germany	1–0	2–0	Friendly	
25	6 April 1930	Olympic Stadium, Amsterdam, Netherlands	Netherlands	1–0	1–1	Friendly	

== Honours ==
Torino

- Divisione Nazionale/Serie A: 1927–28

Italy

- Central European International Cup: 1927–30
- Summer Olympics: Bronze 1928

Individual

- Torino F.C. Hall of Fame

== Bibliography ==
- Brera, Gianni; Milano, Baldini & Castoldi (1998). Storia critica del calcio italiano.
