= Rodolfo Gavinelli =

Italian footballer

Personal information
- Date of birth: 1891
- Date of death: 1921 (aged 29–30)
- Position: Forward

Senior career*
Years	Team	Apps	(Gls)
1908–1911	Piemonte	?	(?)
1913	Andrea Doria	?	(?)

International career
1911	Italy	1	(0)
- * Club domestic league appearances and goals

Rodolfo Gavinelli (Italian pronunciation: [roˈdɔlfo ɡaviˈnɛlli]; 1891 – 1921), given as Pietro Antonio Gavinelli in some sources, was an Italian footballer who played as a forward. On 9 April 1911, he represented the Italy national football team on the occasion of a friendly match against France in a 2–2 away draw; as his date of birth is uncertain, he is the youngest unofficial player to start and feature in a match for Italy.
