= Julio Libonatti =

Argentine footballer (1901–1981)

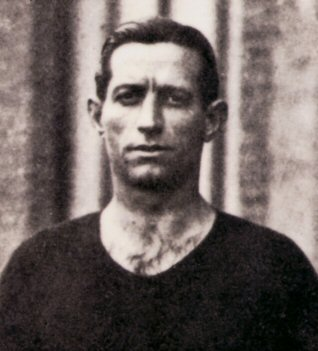

Personal information
- Date of birth: 5 July 1901
- Place of birth: Rosario, Argentina
- Date of death: 9 October 1981 (aged 80)
- Position: Striker

Youth career
- Rosario Central

Senior career*
Years	Team	Apps	(Gls)
1919–1926	Newell's Old Boys	141	(78)
1926–1934	Torino	238	(150)
1934–1936	Genoa	46	(13)
1937–1938	Libertas Rimini	0	(0)
Total		425	(241)

International career
1919–1922	Argentina	15	(8)
1926–1931	Italy	18	(15)

Managerial career
- 1937–1938: Libertas Rimini
Medal record
Men's football
Representing Argentina
South American Championship
Winner	1921 Argentina
Representing Italy
Central European International Cup
Winner	1927-30 Central European International Cup
Runner-up	1931-32 Central European International Cup
- * Club domestic league appearances and goals

Julio Libonatti (5 July 1901 – 9 October 1981) was an Italian Argentine football manager and footballer who played as a forward for the Argentina and Italy national teams.

Born in Rosario, he started his career with Newell's Old Boys in 1917. In 1925, he became the first recorded trans-Atlantic transfer, when he moved to Italian club Torino. With 150 total goals with Torino, he is the second most prolific scorer in the history of the Torinese club after Paolo Pulici (172). He won the Scudetto with Torino in 1926–27 and 1927–28, although the first title was later revoked. Later in his career he also represented Genoa and Libertas Rimini.

Internationally, Libonatti won the 1921 South American Championship with Argentina. He later represented Italy and won the 1927–30 Central European International Cup.

== Early life ==
He was born in Rosario, Argentina into a Calabrian family.

== Club career ==
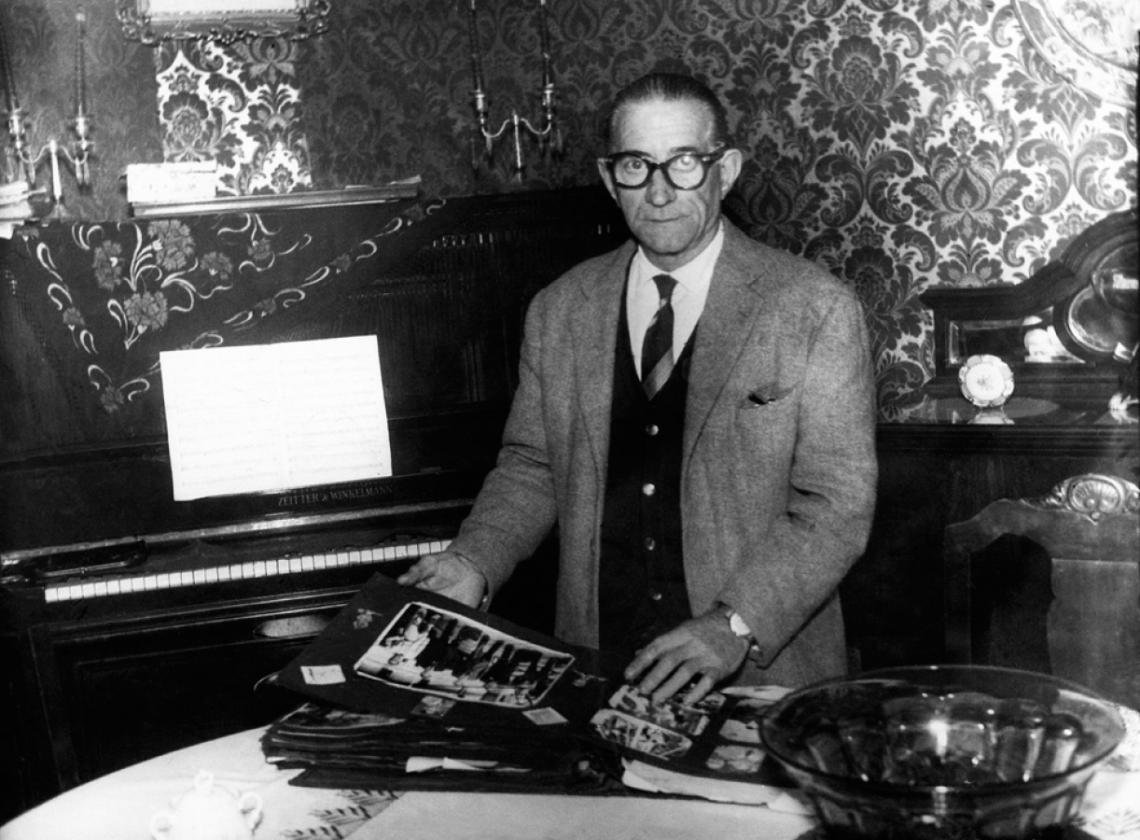
An elderly Libonatti pictured in the 1970s

Libonatti started his youth career with Rosario Central, but began his professional career with the other team of his hometown, Newell's Old Boys. His prolific goal-scoring and acrobatic game led to Libonatti becoming a crowd favourite, and he was nicknamed Matador. In the summer of 1925, due to an agreement that allowed the sons of Italians to take advantage of dual nationality, he moved to Torino.

Libonatti also soon became a fan favourite in Italy. In addition to his acrobatic skills, typical of Argentine players, Libonatti had a tactical intelligence that allowed him to offer spectacular mains balls (in the future they would be called assists) to his teammates. Torino's other forward, Gino Rossetti would benefit the most from Libonatti's play. Behind the two forwards was Torino's playmaker, Adolfo Baloncieri. The three became known as the trio delle meraviglie (Trio of Wonders), and would bring Torino to win two Italian championships (one was revolved). In the 1928–29 season, the club lost a final against Bologna, but the attack managed to score 117 goals in 33 games. With the Granata, Libonatti collected 241 appearances (239 in the league and 2 in Coppa Italia), and scored 157 goals (150 in the league seven in cup competition).

In January 1935, he left Torino for Genoa, who thanks to his contribution were able to return to the top flight. In 1937, he was hired by the Libertas Rimini, where he held the dual role of manager and player.

== International career ==
Libonatti first played with Argentina, winning the 1921 South American Championship as the tournament's top scorer with three goals. He collected 15 caps and 8 goals with Argentina. He then played with Italy, Italy's first Oriundo to play on the national team. His first appearance was on 28 October 1926, collecting a total of 18 caps and 15 goals.

== Honours ==
=== Club ===
Torino

- Divisione Nazionale/Serie A: 1927–28

Genoa

- Serie B: 1934–35

=== International ===
Argentina

- South American Football Championship: 1921

Italy

- Central European International Cup: 1927–30; runner-up: 1931–32

=== Individual ===
- South American Football Championship top scorer: 1921 (3 goals)
- Central European International Cup top scorer: 1927–30 (6 goals)
- Serie A – Top scorer: 1927–28 (21 goals)

== See also ==
- Oriundo
