= 1929–30 Central European Cup for Amateurs =

Tournament details
- Dates: 2. Jun 1929 – 26 October 1930
- Teams: 4

Final positions
- Champions: Poland (1st title)
- Runners-up: Hungary Amateurs
- Third place: Austria Amateurs
- Fourth place: Czechoslovakia Amateurs

Tournament statistics
- Matches played: 12
- Goals scored: 54 (4.5 per match)

The 1929–1930 Central European Cup for Amateurs was the first edition of the Central European International Cup for amateur teams. It was won by Poland, who took part for the first and only time.

== Final standings ==
Rank	Team	Pld	W	D	L	GF	GA	GD	Pts
1	Poland	6	3	1	2	15	10	+5	7
2	Hungary Amateurs	6	3	0	3	13	13	0	6
3	Austria Amateurs	6	3	0	3	14	15	-1	6
4	Czechoslovakia Amateurs	6	2	1	3	12	16	-4	5

== Matches ==
2 June 1929

Poland	5–1	Hungary Amateurs
	Report

Edmund Szyc Stadium, Poznań, Poland

4 August 1929

Poland	2–2	Czechoslovakia Amateurs
	Report

Cracovia Stadium, Kraków, Poland

1 September 1929

Czechoslovakia Amateurs	1–3	Austria Amateurs
	Report

Městský fotbalový stadion Srbská, Brno, Czechoslovakia

15 September 1929

Austria Amateurs	3–2	Hungary Amateurs
	Report

Hohe Warte Stadium, Wien, Austria

6 October 1929

Austria Amateurs	1–3	Poland
	Report

13 October 1929

Czechoslovakia Amateurs	2–1	Hungary Amateurs
	Report

11 May 1930

Hungary Amateurs	3–1	Poland
	Report

Megyeri úti Stadion, Budapest, Hungary

11 May 1930

Austria Amateurs	5–4	Czechoslovakia Amateurs
	Report

1 June 1930

Hungary Amateurs	2–1	Austria Amateurs
	Report

Megyeri úti Stadion, Budapest, Hungary

15 June 1930

Poland	3–1	Austria Amateurs
	Report

Cracovia Stadium, Kraków, Poland

28 September 1930

Hungary Amateurs	4–1	Czechoslovakia
	Report

Megyeri úti Stadion, Budapest, Hungary

26 October 1930

Czechoslovakia Amateurs	2–1	Poland
	Report

Great Strahov Stadium, Prague, Czechoslovakia
