= Gino Rossetti =

Italian footballer and manager

Personal information
- Date of birth: 7 November 1904
- Place of birth: La Spezia, Italy
- Date of death: 15 May 1992 (aged 87)
- Place of death: Turin, Italy
- Position: Forward

Youth career
- 1922–1923: Spezia

Senior career*
| Years | Team | Apps | (Gls) |
| 1921–1926 | Spezia | 103 | (35) |
| 1926–1933 | Torino | 212 | (134) |
| 1933–1937 | Napoli | 120 | (27) |
| 1937–1938 | Torino | 7 | (1) |
| 1938–1939 | Spezia | 26 | (9) |
| 1939–1941 | Macerata | 10 | (2) |

International career
| 1927–1930 | Italy | 13 | (9) |

Managerial career
- 1938–1939: Spezia
Medal record
Representing Italy
Summer Olympics
| Bronze medal – third place | 1928 Amsterdam |
Central European International Cup
| Gold medal – first place | 1927–30 Central European International Cup |
- * Club domestic league appearances and goals

Gino Rossetti (Italian pronunciation: [ˈdʒiːno rosˈsetti]; 7 November 1904 – 15 May 1992) was an Italian football manager and former footballer who played as a forward. He competed in the 1928 Summer Olympics with the Italy national football team, where he won a bronze medal, and was top scorer in the 1927–30 edition of the Central European International Cup, where he won a gold medal.

== Club career ==
=== Spezia ===
Rossetti began his career as a left-winger and debuted at the age of fifteen in the 1919–20 championship with Virtus Spezia. After one more season, he went to play with Spezia, who played in Division II. On the penultimate day of the 1923–24 season, he was involved in a home game against Torino decided by his goal: the game was suspended several times by the referee for problems created by the public. The Piedmontese presented a complaint that was accepted, giving the team the victory in the table and the subsequent victory in the group only after the national finals, played without Torino, who were considered eliminated in the meantime.

=== Torino ===
Rossetti later transferred to Torino and contributed to the conquest of their first league title in 1926–27 (later revoked) and in 1927–28, scoring 19 goals (17 in group B and 2 in the final group) in the first season, and 23 (14 in group A and 9 in the final round) in the second. With Adolfo Baloncieri and Julio Libonatti, he formed "the trio of wonders", Torino's prolific attack during the 1920s.

In the 1928–29 season, he lost a final against Bologna, with the team scoring 117 goals in 33 games (115 in the 30 matches of the first phase and 2 in the 3 final races for the award of the title). Rossetti closed the championship by scoring 36 goals in 30 games.

He remained in Turin until 1933, playing 212 league games and scoring 134 goals.

== International career ==
He was a member of the Italian team which won the bronze medal in the 1928 Summer Olympic football tournament. He was the top scorer when Italy won the 1927–30 Central European International Cup.

== Personal life ==
His brother, Giuseppe, was also a footballer who was known as "Rossetti I", while Gino was known as "Rossetti II".

== Honours ==
=== Club ===
Torino

- Italian Football Championship: 1927–28

=== International ===
Italy

- Central European International Cup: 1927–30
- Summer Olympics: Bronze 1928

=== Individual ===
- Divisione Nazionale – Top scorer: 1928–29 (36 goals)
- Central European International Cup top scorer: 1927–30 (6 goals)
