= Mario Magnozzi =

Italian footballer and manager

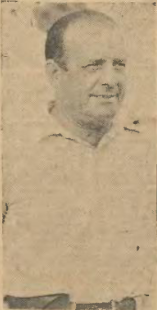
- Mario Magnozzi at AEK Athens

Personal information
- Full name: Mario Giovanni Marcello Magnozzi
- Date of birth: 20 March 1902
- Place of birth: Livorno, Italy
- Date of death: 25 June 1971 (aged 69)
- Place of death: Livorno, Italy
- Position: Striker

Youth career
- 1919–1921: Livorno

Senior career*
Years	Team	Apps	(Gls)
1921–1930	Livorno	223	(174)
1930–1933	Milan	97	(32)
1933–1936	Livorno	57	(11)
Total		377	(217)

International career
1924–1932	Italy	29	(13)

Managerial career
- 1936–1937: Livorno
- 1938–1939: Rieti
- 1940–1941: Alfa Romeo
- 1941–1943: Milan
- 1946–1947: Viareggio
- 1947–1948: Livorno
- 1948–1949: Lecce
- 1949–1950: Catania
- 1951–1953: AEK Athens
- 1954–1956: Livorno
Medal record
Italy
Summer Olympics
Bronze medal – third place	1928 Amsterdam
Central European International Cup
Gold medal – first place	1927–30 Central European International Cup
Central European International Cup
Silver medal – second place	1931–32 Central European International Cup
- * Club domestic league appearances and goals

Mario Magnozzi (Italian pronunciation: [ˈmaːrjo maɲˈɲɔttsi]; 20 March 1902 – 25 June 1971) was an Italian footballer who played as a forward. He competed in the 1928 Summer Olympics with the Italy national team.

== Club career ==
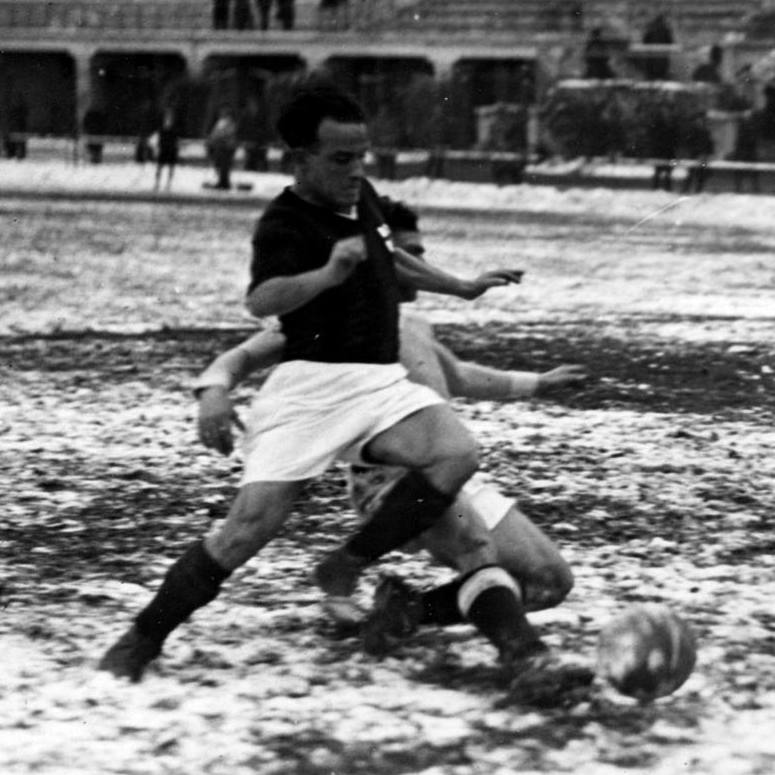
Magnozzi playing for Milan in 1933

Magnozzi was born in Livorno, and played for his home-town club from 1920 until 1930. In 1920 Livorno won the Torneo del Sud, after which they were defeated by Inter (winner of Torneo del Nord) in the final for the overall Italian title. The match finished 3–2 for Internazionale, with both of Livorno's goals being scored by Magnozzi. During the 1924–25 season with Livorno, he was the top scorer in Serie A. In 1930 he moved to Milan, where he served as the club's captain, and remained there until 1932, when he was sold back to Livorno. He remained there until he retired in 1936.

== International career ==
Magnozzi was a member of the Italy national team which won the bronze medal in the football tournament at the 1928 Summer Olympics, and winning the 1927–30 Central European International Cup & making runner-up in the 1931–32 Central European International Cup.

== Managerial career ==
As a manager, Magnozzi took charge at Livorno, helping the club to Serie A promotion after winning the 1936–37 Serie B title. Afterwards, he coached Rieti, Alfa Romeo, Milan, Viareggio, Lecce, Catania and AEK Athens, while he also had two more spells at Livorno.

== Honours ==
=== Player ===
Italy

- Central European International Cup: 1927–30; Runner-up: 1931–32
- Summer Olympics: Bronze 1928

Individual

- Serie A top scorer: 1919–20 (29 goals); 1924–25 (19 goals)

=== Manager ===
Livorno

- Serie B: 1936–37
