= Alfredo Pitto =

Italian footballer (1906–1976)

Personal information
- Date of birth: 25 May 1906
- Place of birth: Livorno, Italy
- Date of death: 16 October 1976 (aged 70)
- Place of death: Milan, Italy
- Position: Midfielder

Senior career*
Years	Team	Apps	(Gls)
1921–1927	Livorno	92	(21)
1927–1931	Bologna	104	(10)
1931–1933	Fiorentina	42	(5)
1933–1936	Ambrosiana-Inter	68	(3)
1936–1937	Livorno	28	(2)
1937–1938	Piombino		

International career
1928–1935	Italy	29	(2)
Medal record
Representing Italy
Summer Olympics
Bronze medal – third place	1928 Amsterdam
Central European International Cup
Gold medal – first place	1927–30 Central European International Cup
Central European International Cup
Silver medal – second place	1931–32 Central European International Cup
Central European International Cup
Gold medal – first place	1933–35 Central European International Cup
- * Club domestic league appearances and goals

Alfredo Pitto (Italian pronunciation: [alˈfreːdo ˈpitto]; 25 May 1906 – 16 October 1976) was an Italian footballer who played as a midfielder. He competed in the 1928 Summer Olympics, winning a bronze medal in the tournament.

== Club career ==
Pitto played for several Italian clubs throughout his career, winning the 1928–29 Divisione Nazionale title with Bologna.

== International career ==
Pitto was a member of the Italy national football team that won the bronze medal in the 1928 Summer Olympics football tournament; he also won two editions of the Central European International Cup with Italy (1927–30 and 1933–35), as well as being runner-up (1931–32).

== Honours ==
=== Club ===
Bologna

- Italian Football Championship: 1928–29

=== International ===
Italy

- Central European International Cup: 1927–30, 1933–35; Runner-up: 1931–32
- Summer Olympics: Bronze 1928
