= Karl Stoiber =

Austrian football forward

Personal information
- Date of birth: 13 October 1907
- Place of birth: Vienna, Austria
- Date of death: 12 December 1994 (aged 87)
- Place of death: Stockerau, Austria
- Position: Forward

Senior career*
Years	Team	Apps	(Gls)
1927–1941	FC Admira Wacker Mödling		
1941–1945	Wiener AC		
1946–1948	SK Donaufeld Wien		
1948–1949	Floridsdorfer AC		

International career
1928–1936	Austria	6	(2)
- * Club domestic league appearances and goals

Karl Stoiber (13 October 1907 – 12 December 1994) was an Austrian football forward. He played six times for Austria, scoring two goals. Stoiber also played for FC Admira Wacker Mödling, Wiener AC, SK Donaufeld Wien and Floridsdorfer AC.
