= Hans Tandler =

Austrian footballer

Personal information
- Date of birth: September 10, 1901
- Place of birth: Austria
- Date of death: 1959
- Position: Defender

Senior career*
Years	Team	Apps	(Gls)
1919–23	Vienna Cricket and Football-Club		
1923–26	SV Amateure		
1926–28	New York Giants	50	(1)
1928–31	Austria Wien		
1933–34	Nice		

International career
1924–30	Austria	18	(3)

Managerial career
- 1933–34: Nice
- 1938–39: Galatasaray
- * Club domestic league appearances and goals

Johann "Hans" Tandler was an Austrian international footballer. He played for Vienna Cricket and Football-Club, SV Amateure, New York Giants and Austria Wien at the club level. He made 18 appearances for the Austria national team, scoring three goals.

After retiring he managed Galatasaray for one year.
