= 1927–1930 Central European International Cup =

1927–30 Central European International Cup
Tournament details
- Dates: 18 September 1927 – 11 May 1930
- Teams: 5

Final positions
- Champions: Italy (1st title)
- Runners-up: Austria
- Third place: Czechoslovakia
- Fourth place: Hungary

Tournament statistics
- Matches played: 20
- Goals scored: 86 (4.3 per match)
- Attendance: 589,022 (29,451 per match)
- Top goal scorer(s): (Italy) Julio Libonatti (Italy) Gino Rossetti (Hungary) Ferenc Hirzer (6 goals each)

The 1927–30 Central European International Cup was the first edition of the football Central European International Cup and was held between September 18, 1927, and May 11, 1930. The tournament's structure included a round-robin competition for the five teams involved. As the winner was to receive a Bohemian crystal cup offered by Prime Minister of Czechoslovakia Antonín Švehla, the tournament became known as the Antonín Švehla Cup.

== Organizing committee ==
Sessions of the organizing committee took place on March 9, 1930, in Trieste and on March 11, 1930, in Budapest. The committee was composed by

- M. Ferretti, president
- M. Fischer, vice-president
- Hugo Meisl, secretary
- Giovanni Mauro, technical expert

== Events ==
=== 1927 ===
The tournament began on September 18, 1927, with the match Czechoslovakia-Austria, which ended 2–0. The following week, Austria was defeated once more in Budapest, Hungary, with a score of 5–3.
On October 23, in Prague, Italy's match against Czechoslovakia ended with a 2–2 draw. The last game of 1927 took place in Bologna between Italy and Austria, won 1–0 by Austria. The Austrian team complained in this occasion that the referee seemed not sufficiently impartial or fair.

=== 1928 ===
1928 opened with Italy's victory against Switzerland on January 1 in Genoa (3–2) and then, on March 25 in Rome, Italy succeeded in beating Hungary for the first time in history (4- 3). Each player on the Italian team was awarded a prize of 24,000 [Italian lira|lire]. On April 1, in Vienna, Austria lost 0–1 against Czechoslovakia; on April 22, in Budapest, the Czech team lost 2–0 to Hungary.
After a break to allow Switzerland and Italy to participate in the 1928 Summer Olympics in Amsterdam, the tournament resumed in the fall: Italy beat Switzerland (3–2); Austria wins 5–1 over Hungary and 2–0 over Switzerland. The year ended with the victory of Hungary on Switzerland, on November 1, 3–1.

=== 1929 ===
On March 3, 1929, Italy beat Czechoslovakia 4–2, losing 3–0 to the Austrians barely a month later, on April 7, in Vienna. On April 14 Hungary beats Switzerland 5–4, and the Swiss team surrenders again to the Czechs (4–1) on 5 May. The two winning teams draw in the match (1–1) held in Prague on September 8. On October 6, Czechoslovakia beats Switzerland 5–0, and the Swiss's annus horribilis continues with a loss to Austria on October 27, on Bern's home turf. At year end, with Switzerland last after losing all eight games played, Austria and Czechoslovakia are tied with 10 points at the head of the tournament, followed by Italy and Hungary with 9 points each.

=== 1930 ===
The only game scheduled for 1930 was between Hungary and Italy. The match was played on May 11, 1930, in Budapest, and it is reported that Italy's trainer, Vittorio Pozzo brought his players to visit World War I battlefields before playing the last and decisive game of the tournament, perhaps wishing to bring back memories of their own participation, just 13 years earlier, in the fight against Austro-Hungarian soldiers. The team's crushing victory (5–0) brought Italy the first edition of the cup.

== Final standings and results ==
| Pos | Team | Pld | W | D | L | GF | GA | GD | Pts | (Italy) | (Austria) | (Czechoslovakia) | (Hungary) | (Switzerland) |
|---|---|---|---|---|---|---|---|---|---|---|---|---|---|---|
| 1 | Italy | 8 | 5 | 1 | 2 | 21 | 15 | +6 | 11 | — | 0–1 | 4–2 | 4–3 | 3–2 |
| 2 | Austria | 8 | 5 | 0 | 3 | 17 | 10 | +7 | 10 | 3–0 | — | 0–1 | 5–1 | 2–0 |
| 3 | Czechoslovakia | 8 | 4 | 2 | 2 | 17 | 10 | +7 | 10 | 2–2 | 2–0 | — | 1–1 | 5–0 |
| 4 | Hungary | 8 | 4 | 1 | 3 | 20 | 23 | −3 | 9 | 0–5 | 5–3 | 2–0 | — | 3–1 |
| 5 | Switzerland | 8 | 0 | 0 | 8 | 11 | 28 | −17 | 0 | 2–3 | 1–3 | 1–4 | 4–5 | — |

Source: RSSSF

== Matches ==
18 September 1927
16:00 UTC+1

| Czechoslovakia | 2–0 | Austria |
|---|---|---|
| Podrazil 10'; Kratochvíl 55' (pen.) | Report |

Great Strahov Stadium, Prague, Czechoslovakia
Attendance: 25,000
Referee: Ernest Fabris (Yugoslavia)

25 September 1927
15:30 UTC+1

| Hungary | 5–3 | Austria |
|---|---|---|
| Takács 18'; Kohut 27'; Ströck 51'; Holzbauer 62'; Hirzer 67' | Report | Wesely 11', 84'; Sigl 13' |

Üllői úti stadion, Budapest, Hungary
Attendance: 38,000
Referee: Albert Prince-Cox (England)

23 October 1927
15:00 UTC+1

| Czechoslovakia | 2–2 | Italy |
|---|---|---|
| Svoboda 32', 51' (pen.) | Report | Libonatti 28', 79' |

Stadion Letná, Prague, Czechoslovakia
Attendance: 12,000
Referee: John Langenus (Belgium)

6 November 1927
14:30 UTC+1

| Italy | 0–1 | Austria |
|---|---|---|
| | Report | Runge 44' |

Stadio Littorale, Bologna, Kingdom of Italy
Attendance: 30,000
Referee: Albert Prince-Cox (England)

1 January 1928
14:30 UTC+1

| Italy | 3–2 | Switzerland |
|---|---|---|
| Libonatti 10', 58'; Magnozzi 68' | Report | M. Abegglen 38', 60' |

Stadio Comunale, Genoa, Kingdom of Italy
Attendance: 28,000
Referee: Stanley Rous (England)

25 March 1928
15:00 UTC+1

| Italy | 4–3 | Hungary |
|---|---|---|
| Conti 48', 75'; Rossetti 58'; Libonatti 85' | Report | Kohut 13'; Hirzer 44'; Takács 77' |

Stadio Nazionale PNF, Rome, Kingdom of Italy
Attendance: 25,000
Referee: Peco Bauwens (Germany)

1 April 1928
16:30 UTC+1

| Austria | 0–1 | Czechoslovakia |
|---|---|---|
| | Report | Silný 38' |

Hohe Warte Stadium, Vienna, Austria
Attendance: 50,575
Referee: John Langenus (Belgium)

22 April 1928
16:30 UTC+1

| Hungary | 2–0 | Czechoslovakia |
|---|---|---|
| Hirzer 18' (pen.); Kohut 76' | Report |

Üllői úti stadion, Budapest, Hungary
Attendance: 38,000
Referee: Raphaël van Praag (Belgium)

7 October 1928
15:30 UTC+1

| Austria | 5–1 | Hungary |
|---|---|---|
| Sigl 11', 27'; Weselik 55'; Wesely 62'; Gschweidl 75' | Report | Hirzer 38' |

Hohe Warte Stadium, Vienna, Austria
Attendance: 40,000
Referee: Alfred Birlem (Germany)

14 October 1928
15:00 UTC+1

| Switzerland | 2–3 | Italy |
|---|---|---|
| M. Abbeglen 2'; Grimmn 85' | Report | Rossetti 17', 30'; Baloncieri 80' |

Sportplatz Förrlibuck, Zürich, Switzerland
Attendance: 20,000
Referee: Eugen Braun (Austria)

28 October 1928
14:45 UTC+1

| Austria | 2–0 | Switzerland |
|---|---|---|
| Tandler 25', 29' (pen.) | Report |

Hohe Warte Stadium, Vienna, Austria
Attendance: 38,447
Referee: Peco Bauwens (Germany)

1 November 1928
14:30 UTC+1

| Hungary | 3–1 | Switzerland |
|---|---|---|
| Turay 36'; Hirzer 49'; Ströck 53' | Report | Weiler 78' (pen.) |

Üllői úti stadion, Budapest, Hungary
Attendance: 20,000
Referee: Albino Carraro (Italy)

3 March 1929
15:00 UTC+1

| Italy | 4–2 | Czechoslovakia |
|---|---|---|
| Rossetti 26', 61', 80'; Libonatti 33' | Report | Silný 18'; Svoboda 40' |

Stadio Littorale, Bologna, Kingdom of Italy
Attendance: 35,000
Referee: Henri Christophe (Belgium)

7 April 1929
16:30 UTC+1

| Austria | 3–0 | Italy |
|---|---|---|
| Horvath 19', 38'; Weselik 23' | Report |

Hohe Warte Stadium, Vienna, Austria
Attendance: 49,000
Referee: Albert Prince-Cox (England)

14 April 1929
15:00 UTC+1

| Switzerland | 4–5 | Hungary |
|---|---|---|
| Weiler 2'; A. Abegglen 26', 66'; M. Abegglen 78' | Report | Widmer 8' (o.g.); Takács 51', 76'; Toldi 56'; Hirzer 73' |

Wankdorf Stadium, Bern, Switzerland
Attendance: 19,000
Referee: Stanley Rous (England)

5 May 1929
15:00 UTC+1

| Switzerland | 1–4 | Czechoslovakia |
|---|---|---|
| M. Abegglen 74' | Report | Podrazil 22'; Silný 23', 85'; Puč 80' |

Stade Olympique de la Pontaise, Lausanne, Switzerland
Attendance: 20,000
Referee: Eugen Braun (Austria)

8 September 1929
16:30 UTC+1

| Czechoslovakia | 1–1 | Hungary |
|---|---|---|
| Svoboda 4' | Report | Kalmár 84' |

Stadion Letná, Prague, Czechoslovakia
Attendance: 28,000
Referee: Paul Ruoff (Switzerland)

6 October 1929
15:30 UTC+1

| Czechoslovakia | 5–0 | Switzerland |
|---|---|---|
| Puč 17', 81'; Kratochvíl 18'; Svoboda 36'; Junek 64' | Report |

Stadion Letná, Prague, Czechoslovakia
Attendance: 17,000
Referee: John Langenus (Belgium)

27 October 1929
15:00 UTC+1

| Switzerland | 1–3 | Austria |
|---|---|---|
| Passello 45' | Report | Stoiber 25'; Horvath 62'; Schall 84' |

Wankdorf Stadium, Bern, Switzerland
Attendance: 16,000
Referee: Per Andersen (Norway)

11 May 1930
16:00 UTC+1

| Hungary | 0–5 | Italy |
|---|---|---|
| | Report | Meazza 17', 65', 70'; Magnozzi 72'; Costantino 84' |

Üllői úti stadion, Budapest, Hungary
Attendance: 40,000
Referee: Peco Bauwens (Germany)

== Winner ==
1927–30 Central European International Cup

Italy
First title

== Statistics ==
=== Goalscorers ===
There were 86 goals scored in 20 matches, for an average of 4.3 goals per match.

6 goals

- (Italy) Gino Rossetti
- (Italy) Julio Libonatti
- (Hungary) Ferenc Hirzer

5 goals

- (Switzerland) Max Abegglen
- (Czechoslovakia) František Svoboda

4 goals

- (Hungary) József Takács
- (Czechoslovakia) Josef Silný

3 goals

- (Austria) Ferdinand Wesely
- (Austria) Ignaz Sigl
- (Austria) Johann Horvath
- (Hungary) Vilmos Kohut
- (Italy) Giuseppe Meazza
- (Czechoslovakia) Antonín Puč

2 goals

- (Austria) Franz Weselik
- (Austria) Hans Tandler
- (Hungary) Albert Ströck
- (Italy) Leopoldo Conti
- (Italy) Mario Magnozzi
- (Switzerland) André Abegglen
- (Czechoslovakia) Karel Podrazil
- (Czechoslovakia) Josef Kratochvíl

1 goal

- (Austria) Franz Runge
- (Austria) Fritz Gschweidl
- (Austria) Karl Stoiber
- (Austria) Toni Schall
- (Hungary) Jenő Kalmár
- (Hungary) József Holzbauer
- (Hungary) József Turay
- (Hungary) Géza Toldi
- (Italy) Adolfo Baloncieri
- (Italy) Raffaele Costantino
- (Switzerland) René Grimm
- (Switzerland) Raymond Passello
- (Switzerland) Max Weiler
- (Switzerland) Walter Weiler
- (Czechoslovakia) František Junek

1 own goal

- (Switzerland) Georg Widmer (against Hungary)
