= Luigi Allemandi =

Italian footballer (1903–1978)

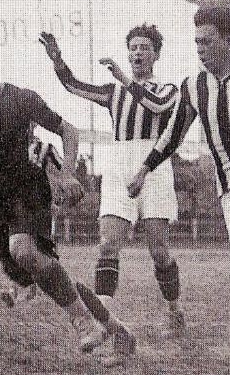
- Allemandi with Juventus in 1926

Personal information
- Full name: Luigi Allemandi
- Date of birth: 8 November 1903
- Place of birth: San Damiano Macra, Italy
- Date of death: 25 September 1978 (aged 74)
- Place of death: Pietra Ligure, Italy
- Height: 1.83 m (6 ft 0 in)
- Position: Defender

Senior career*
Years	Team	Apps	(Gls)
1919–1921	Legnanesi		
1921–1925	Legnano	85	(22)
1925–1927	Juventus	27	(0)
1927–1935	Inter Milan	193	(0)
1935–1937	Roma	50	(1)
1937–1938	Venezia	23	(0)
1938–1939	Lazio	2	(0)

International career
1925–1936	Italy	24	(0)
Medal record
Italy
Central European International Cup
Gold medal – first place	1927–30 Central European International Cup
Central European International Cup
Silver medal – second place	1931–32 Central European International Cup
FIFA World Cup
Gold medal – first place	1934 Italy
Central European International Cup
Gold medal – first place	1933–35 Central European International Cup
- * Club domestic league appearances and goals

Luigi Allemandi (Italian pronunciation: [luˈiːdʒi alleˈmandi]; 8 November 1903 – 25 September 1978) was an Italian footballer who played as a defender, usually as a left back. He was a member of the Italy national team which won the 1934 World Cup.

== Club career ==
Born in San Damiano Macra, province of Cuneo, Allemandi debuted in 1921 with A.C. Legnano. Later, he played with Juventus FC, F.C. Internazionale Milano, A.S. Roma, S.S.C. Venezia and S.S. Lazio, and also had a successful international career with Italy. However, the part of his career that stands out is the corruption scandal in the Torino–Juventus derby in 1927 that resulted in Torino being stripped of their title.

According to the official account, a manager from Torino offered Allemandi 35 000 lira to throw the game, 25 000 immediately and the rest after the match. Torino won the match 2–1, but Allemandi was one of the best players in the field, and when he went to collect the rest of the money he was refused. A journalist found out about the match fixing and went public with the information. After a controversial trial, along with Torino's title revocation, Allemandi was banned for life even though he always self-proclaimed innocent. He was later pardoned by CONI in 1928 and could play for Ambrosiana-Inter.

== International career ==
After debuting for the Italy national team in 1925, Allemandi eventually won the left back position from Umberto Caligaris before their 1934 World Cup qualifying match against Greece. Manager Vittorio Pozzo started him in every match of the final tournament, helping the Azzurri win the title on home soil; he later served as Italy's captain between 1935 and 1936. He is also one of 9 players being part of both the 1927–30 Central European International Cup, the 1931-32 Central European International Cup & the 1933–35 Central European International Cup successful campaigns.

== Honours ==
=== Club ===
Juventus

- Prima Divisione: 1925–26

Ambrosiana-Inter

- Serie A: 1929–30

=== International ===
Italy

- FIFA World Cup: 1934
- Central European International Cup: 1927–30, 1933–35; Runner-up: 1931–32

== See also ==
- Allemandi Case
