= Central European International Cup =

European International Cup of Nations
- Founded: 1927
- Abolished: 1960; 66 years ago
- Region: Central Europe & South Europe (UEFA)
- Teams: 5 (1927–1953); 6 (1955–1960)
- Last champions: Czechoslovakia (1st title)
- Most championships: Italy (2 titles)

The European International Cup of Nations was an international football competition held by certain national teams from Central Europe & South Europe between 1927 and 1960. There were competitions for professional and amateur teams. Participating nations were: Italy, Austria, Czechoslovakia, Hungary, Switzerland, Poland, Romania, and (in the final competition) Yugoslavia. Poland and Romania only competed in the amateur competition.

Played as a league on a home and away basis, it was contested six times and each single tournament usually took more than two years to complete. The last two tournaments lasted five years. It was discontinued in 1960, when the European Football Championship started. Winners of the competition included the Austrian Wunderteam of the early 1930s, the Italy team that also won two World Cups in the 1930s, the Golden Team of Hungary and the Czechoslovakia team that later finished as World Cup runners up in 1962.

== Trophy ==
The trophy of the early competitions was named Švehla Cup after Antonín Švehla, the prime minister of Czechoslovakia, who donated it. After the Second World War the new trophy was known as the Dr. Gerö Cup in honour of Josef Gerö, a director of the Austrian Football Association and former match referee.

== History ==
The competition was conceived by the Austrian football pioneer Hugo Meisl, regarded by some as one of the fathers of European football. Meisl was also behind the launch of the Mitropa Cup, a knockout competition for club teams from the same countries which also began in 1927. He also managed Austria during the Wunderteam era of the 1930s and led them to victory in the 1931-32 competition.

The first tournament played between 1927 and 1930 had been won by an Italy team inspired by Giuseppe Meazza. Meazza and Italy also won the 1933-35 competition. This time the team was coached by Vittorio Pozzo and either side of winning this competition they also won two World Cups in 1934 and 1938. The fourth tournament which began in 1936 was eventually abandoned due to the Anschluss Crisis and because of the Second World War, while a fifth tournament was not held until 1948. This tournament marked the advent of the Golden Team of Hungary, coached by Gusztáv Sebes and featuring Ferenc Puskás, Zoltán Czibor, Sándor Kocsis, Nándor Hidegkuti, József Bozsik and Gyula Grosics. They claimed the trophy after a 3–0 win over Italy in Rome in 1953.

== Most successful teams ==
| Country | Winners | Runners-up | Third place |
|---|---|---|---|
| Italy | 2 times (1927–30, 1933–35) | 1 (1931–32) | — |
| Austria | 1 time (1931–32) | 2 (1927–30, 1933–35) | 2 (1948–53, 1955–60) |
| Czechoslovakia | 1 time (1955–60) | 2 (1927–30, 1948–53) | — |
| Hungary | 1 time (1948–53) | 1 (1955–1960) | 2 (1931–32, 1933–35) |

== Final placings ==
| Years | Classification | | | | | |
| Years | Winner | Points | Runner-up | Points | Third place | Points |
|---|---|---|---|---|---|---|
| 1927–1930 | Italy | 11 | Czechoslovakia and Austria | | | 10 |
| 1931–1932 | Austria | 11 | Italy | 9 | Hungary | 8 |
| 1933–1935 | Italy | 11 | Austria | 9 | Hungary | 9 |
| 1936–1938 | Tournament not completed due to the Anschluss | | | | | |
| 1948–1953 | Hungary | 11 | Czechoslovakia | 9 | Austria | 9 |
| 1955–1960 | Czechoslovakia | 16 | Hungary | 15 | Austria | 11 |

| Years | Classification (Amateur Competition) | | | | | |
| Years | Winner | Points | Runner-up | Points | Third place | Points |
|---|---|---|---|---|---|---|
| 1929–1930 | Poland | 7 | Hungary (A) | 6 | Austria (A) | 6 |
| 1931–1934 | Romania | 9 | Hungary (A) | 6 | Czechoslovakia (A) | 5 |

== Summary (1927-1930/1955-1960) ==
| Rank | Team | Part | M | W | D | L | GF | GA | GD | Points |
|---|---|---|---|---|---|---|---|---|---|---|
| 1 | Hungary | 6 | 49 | 25 | 12 | 12 | 139 | 112 | +27 | 87 |
| 2 | Czechoslovakia | 6 | 48 | 22 | 13 | 13 | 104 | 86 | +18 | 79 |
| 3 | Austria | 6 | 48 | 22 | 11 | 15 | 102 | 88 | +14 | 77 |
| 4 | Italy | 6 | 46 | 21 | 11 | 14 | 84 | 77 | +7 | 74 |
| 5 | Switzerland | 6 | 50 | 4 | 8 | 38 | 78 | 169 | -91 | 20 |
| 6 | Yugoslavia | 1 | 10 | 3 | 3 | 4 | 21 | 13 | +8 | 12 |

== Amateur Summary (1929-1930/1931-1934) ==
| Rank | Team | Part | M | W | D | L | GF | GA | GD | Points |
|---|---|---|---|---|---|---|---|---|---|---|
| 1 | Hungary | 2 | 12 | 6 | 0 | 6 | 36 | 31 | +5 | 18 |
| 2 | Austria | 2 | 12 | 5 | 0 | 7 | 25 | 36 | -11 | 15 |
| 3 | Czechoslovakia | 2 | 12 | 4 | 2 | 6 | 27 | 33 | -6 | 14 |
| 4 | Romania | 1 | 6 | 4 | 1 | 1 | 16 | 9 | +7 | 13 |
| 5 | Poland | 1 | 6 | 3 | 1 | 2 | 15 | 10 | +5 | 10 |

== Topscorers per tournament ==
| Years | Top Scorers | | | |
| Years | Goals | Striker | National team | Ref. |
|---|---|---|---|---|
| 1927–1930 | 6 goals | Julio Libonatti; Gino Rossetti; Ferenc Hirzer | Italy; Italy; Hungary | |
| 1931–1932 | 8 goals | István Avar; André Abegglen | Hungary; Switzerland | |
| 1933–1935 | 7 goals | Leopold Kielholz; György Sárosi | Switzerland; Hungary | |
| 1936–1938 | 10 goals | György Sárosi | Hungary | |
| 1948–1953 | 10 goals | Ferenc Puskás | Hungary | |
| 1955–1960 | 7 goals | Lajos Tichy | Hungary | |

== All-time top goalscorers ==
| Rank | Name | Team | Goals | Tournaments |
|---|---|---|---|---|
| 1 | (Hungary) György Sárosi | Hungary | 17 | 1933–35 (7 goals), 1936–38 (10 goals) |
| 2 | (Hungary) Ferenc Puskas | Hungary | 15 | 1948–53 (10 goals), 1955–60 (5 goals) |
| 3 | (Switzerland) André Abegglen | Switzerland | 12 | 1927–30 (2 goals), 1931–32 (8 goals), 1933–35 (2 goals) |
| 4 | (Czechoslovakia) František Svoboda | Czechoslovakia | 11 | 1927–30 (5 goals), 1931–32 (5 goals), 1936–38 (1 goals) |
| 5 | (Hungary) István Avar | Hungary | 10 | 1931–32 (8 goals), 1933–35 (2 goals) |
| 5 | (Hungary) Géza Toldi | Hungary | 10 | 1927–30 (1 goal), 1931–32 (2 goals), 1933–35 (2 goals), 1936–38 (5 goals) |
| 7 | (Kingdom of Italy) Giuseppe Meazza | Italy | 8 | 1927–30 (3 goals), 1931–32 (2 goals), 1933–35 (2 goals), 1936–38 (1 goal) |
| 7 | (Austria) Karl Zischek | Austria | 8 | 1931–32 (3 goals), 1933–35 (5 goals) |
| 9 | (Kingdom of Italy) Julio Libonatti | Italy | 7 | 1927–30 (6 goals), 1931–32 (1 goal) |
| 9 | (Switzerland) Max Abegglen | Switzerland | 7 | 1927–30 (5 goals), 1931–32 (2 goals) |
| 9 | (Czechoslovakia) Josef Silný | Czechoslovakia | 7 | 1927–30 (4 goals), 1931–32 (3 goals) |
| 9 | (Switzerland) Leopold Kielholz | Switzerland | 7 | 1933–35 (7 goals) |
| 9 | (Austria) Matthias Sindelar | Austria | 7 | 1931–32 (4 goals), 1936–38 (3 goals) |
| 9 | (Kingdom of Italy) Silvio Piola | Italy | 7 | 1933–35 (2 goals), 1936–38 (5 goals) |
| 9 | (Hungary) Ferenc Deák | Hungary | 7 | 1948–53 (7 goals) |
| 9 | (Hungary) Lajos Tichy | Hungary | 7 | 1955–60 (7 goals) |
| 17 | (Italy) Gino Rossetti | Italy | 6 | 1927–30 (6 goals) |
| 17 | (Hungary) Ferenc Hirzer | Hungary | 6 | 1927–30 (6 goals) |
| 17 | (Austria) Anton Schall | Austria | 6 | 1927–30 (1 goal), 1931–32 (5 goals) |
| 17 | (Czechoslovakia) Oldřich Nejedlý | Czechoslovakia | 6 | 1931–32 (1 goal), 1933–35(4 goals), 1936–38 (1 goal) |
| 17 | (Austria) Josef Bican | Austria | 6 | 1933–35 (5 goals), 1936–38 (1 goal) |
| 17 | (Czechoslovakia) Antonín Puč | Czechoslovakia | 6 | 1927–30 (3 goals), 1931–32 (1 goal), 1933–35 (1 goal), 1936-38 (1 goal) |
| 17 | (Hungary) Sandor Kocsis | Hungary | 6 | 1948–53 (2 goals), 1955–60 (4 goals) |

== Most successful players ==
- (Kingdom of Italy) Giuseppe Meazza
- (Kingdom of Italy) Eraldo Monzeglio
- (Kingdom of Italy) Raimundo Orsi
- (Kingdom of Italy) Raffaele Costantino
- (Kingdom of Italy) Alfredo Pitto
- (Kingdom of Italy) Umberto Caligaris
- (Kingdom of Italy) Luigi Allemandi
- (Kingdom of Italy) Virginio Rosetta
- (Kingdom of Italy) Gianpiero Combi

Winners in 1927–30, 1933–35 and runners-up in 1931–32.

== Hat-tricks ==
Since the first official tournament in 1927–30, 17 hat-tricks have been scored in over 100 matches of the 6 editions of the tournament. The first hat-trick was scored by Gino Rossetti of the Italy, playing against Czechoslovakia on 3 March 1929; and the last was by Lajos Tichy of Hungary, playing against Switzerland on 25 October 1959. The record number of hat-tricks in a single World Cup tournament is five, during the 1931–32. The only player to have scored two hat-tricks is István Avar, both in 1931. György Sárosi holds the record for most goals scored in a single Central European Cup match when he scored 7 for Hungary in an 8–3 win over Czechoslovakia (6 of which came in the second-half). Hungary holds the record for most hat-tricks scored with 7 (the next closest are Czechoslovakia and Italy with 3). Switzerland holds the record for most hat-tricks conceded with 7 (the next closest is Austria with 4).

=== List ===
Central European International Cup hat-tricks
| # | Player | G | Time of goals | For | Result | Against | Tournament | Date | FIFA report |
|---|---|---|---|---|---|---|---|---|---|
| 1. | Gino Rossetti | 3 | 26', 61', 80' | Italy | 4–2 | Czechoslovakia | 1927–30 Central European International Cup | 3 March 1929 | Report |
| 2. | Giuseppe Meazza | 3 | 17', 65', 70' | Italy | 5–0 | Hungary | 1927–30 Central European International Cup | 11 May 1930 | Report |
| 3. | István Avar | 3 | 11', 33', 53' | Hungary | 3–3 | Czechoslovakia | 1931–32 Central European International Cup | 22 March 1931 | Report |
| 4. | István Avar | 3 | 3', 71', 87' | Hungary | 6–2 | Switzerland | 1931–32 Central European International Cup | 12 April 1931 | Report |
| 5. | Karel Bejbl | 3 | 12', 53', 82' | Czechoslovakia | 7–3 | Switzerland | 1931–32 Central European International Cup | 13 June 1931 | Report |
| 6. | Anton Schall | 3 | 49', 80', 86' | Austria | 1–8 | Switzerland | 1931–32 Central European International Cup | 29 November 1931 | Report |
| 7. | Francisco Fedullo | 3 | 30', 32', 55' | Italy | 3–0 | Switzerland | 1931–32 Central European International Cup | 14 February 1932 | Report |
| 8. | Karl Zischek | 3 | 19', 23', 55' | Austria | 2–4 | Italy | 1933–35 Central European International Cup | 11 February 1934 | Report |
| 9. | Leopold Kielholz | 3 | 21', 35', 57' | Switzerland | 6–2 | Hungary | 1933–35 Central European International Cup | 14 April 1935 | Report |
| 10. | Josef Bican | 3 | 7', 11', 58' | Austria | 4–4 | Hungary | 1933–35 Central European International Cup | 22 September 1935 | Report |
| 11. | Géza Toldi | 3 | 15', 29', 63' | Hungary | 5–3 | Austria | 1936–38 Central European International Cup | 27 September 1936 | Report |
| 12. | František Kloz | 4 | 27', 30', 79', 82' | Czechoslovakia | 5–2 | Switzerland | 1936–38 Central European International Cup | 18 October 1936 | Report |
| 13. | Gyula Zsengellér | 3 | 41', 61', 71' | Hungary | 1–5 | Switzerland | 1936–38 Central European International Cup | 11 April 1937 | Report |
| 14. | György Sárosi | 7 | 34', 51', 60', 62', 77', 80', 85' | Hungary | 8–3 | Austria | 1936–38 Central European International Cup | 19 September 1937 | Report |
| 15. | Ferenc Puskás | 3 | 32', 82', 89' | Hungary | 6–1 | Austria | 1948–53 Central European International Cup | 8 May 1949 | Report |
| 16. | Jiří Feureisl | 4 | 21', 31', 61', 66' | Czechoslovakia | 1–6 | Switzerland | 1955–60 Central European International Cup | 10 May 1956 | Report |
| 17. | Lajos Tichy | 4 | 19', 28', 35', 66' | Hungary | 8–0 | Switzerland | 1955–60 Central European International Cup | 25 October 1959 | Report |

== See also ==
- Mitropa Cup – the equivalent for club teams.
