= Italy national football team results (1930–1949) =

- Win Draw Loss Fixture

This is a list of the Italy national football team results from 1930 to 1949. During this period, Italy achieved first place at the 1934 and 1938 FIFA World Cup, the gold medal at the 1936 Olympic football tournament, and first place at the 1927–30 and the 1933–35 Central European International Cup as well as coming in second place at the 1931–32 and the 1936–38 (Note: This edition of the tournament was interrupted due to the annexation of Austria to Nazi Germany on 12 March 1938.) editions of the latter tournament.

== Results ==
=== 1930 ===
9 February 1930 International friendly	Italy	4–2	Switzerland	Rome, Italy
14:30 CET (UTC+01:00)	Magnozzi 22'; Orsi 26'; Meazza 37', 39'	Report	Poretti 17', 19'	Stadium: Stadio Nazionale PNF; Attendance: 30,000; Referee: E. Gray (England)

2 March 1930 International friendly	Germany	0–2	Italy	Frankfurt, Germany
15:00 CET (UTC+01:00)		Report	Baloncieri 53'; Meazza 75'	Stadium: Waldstadion; Attendance: 45,000; Referee: Paul Ruoff (Switzerland)

6 April 1930 International friendly	Netherlands	1–1	Italy	Amsterdam, Netherlands
15:00 AT (UTC+00:20)	van den Broek 63'	Report	Baloncieri 24'	Stadium: Olympic Stadium; Attendance: 30,000; Referee: Peco Bauwens (Germany)

11 May 1930 1927–30 Central European International Cup	Hungary	0–5	Italy	Budapest, Hungary
16:00 CET (UTC+01:00)		Report	Meazza 17', 65', 70'; Magnozzi 72'; Costantino 84'	Stadium: Üllői úti stadion Attendance: 40,000; Referee: Peco Bauwens (Germany)

22 June 1930 International friendly	Italy	2–3	Spain	Bologna, Italy
16:00 CET (UTC+01:00)	Costantino 3', 40'	Report	Regueiro 30', 72'; Ventolrà 87'	Stadium: Stadio Littoriale; Attendance: 46,000; Referee: Raphaël van Praag (Belgium)

=== 1931 ===
25 January 1931 International friendly	Italy	5–0	France	Bologna, Italy
14:30 CET (UTC+01:00)	Meazza 21', 34', 40'; Cesarini 51'; Cattaneo 73'	Report		Stadium: Stadio Littoriale; Attendance: 48,000; Referee: Paul Ruoff (Switzerland)

22 February 1931 1931–32 Central European International Cup	Italy	2–1	Austria	Milan, Italy
14:45 CET (UTC+01:00)	Meazza 34'; Orsi 52'	Report	Horvath 4'	Stadium: San Siro; Attendance: 45,000; Referee: Paul Ruoff (Switzerland)

29 March 1931 1931–32 Central European International Cup	Switzerland	1–1	Italy	Bern, Switzerland
14:45 CET (UTC+01:00)	Abegglen 70' (pen.)	Report	Cesarini 85'	Stadium: Wankdorf Stadium; Attendance: 22,000; Referee: Stanley Rous (England)

12 April 1931 International friendly	Portugal	0–2	Italy	Porto, Portugal
15:30 WET (UTC±00:00)		Report	Orsi 35'; Ferrari 41'	Stadium: Campo do Ameal; Attendance: 15,000; Referee: José Llovera (Spain)

19 April 1931 International friendly	Spain	0–0	Italy	Bilbao, Spain
15:30 WET (UTC±00:00)		Report		Stadium: San Mamés Stadium; Attendance: 22,000; Referee: Louis Baert (Belgium)

20 May 1931 International friendly	Italy	3–0	Scotland	Rome, Italy
16:00 CET (UTC+01:00)	Costantino 6'; Meazza 42'; Orsi 87'	Report		Stadium: Stadio Nazionale PNF; Attendance: 25,000; Referee: Peco Bauwens (Germany)

15 November 1931 1931–32 Central European International Cup	Italy	2–2	Czechoslovakia	Rome, Italy
14:45 CET (UTC+01:00)	Pitto 53'; Bernardini 57' (pen.)	Report	Svoboda 55', 83'	Stadium: Stadio Nazionale PNF; Attendance: 35,000; Referee: Paul Ruoff (Switzerland)

13 December 1931 1931–32 Central European International Cup	Italy	3–2	Hungary	Turin, Italy
14:30 CET (UTC+01:00)	Libonatti 22'; Orsi 56'; Cesarini 90'	Report	Avar 53', 60'	Stadium: Stadio Filadelfia; Attendance: 40,000; Referee: René Mercet (Switzerland)

=== 1932 ===
14 February 1932 1931–32 Central European International Cup	Italy	3–0	Switzerland	Naples, Italy
14:30 CET (UTC+01:00)	Fedullo 30', 32', 55'	Report		Stadium: Stadio Giorgio Ascarelli; Attendance: 30,000; Referee: Peco Bauwens (Germany)

20 March 1932 1931–32 Central European International Cup	Austria	2–1	Italy	Wien, Austria
15:00 CET (UTC+01:00)	Sindelar 56', 58'	Report	Meazza 66'	Stadium: Ernst-Happel-Stadion; Attendance: 63,000; Referee: Paul Ruoff (Switzerland)

10 April 1932 International friendly	France	1–2	Italy	Colombes, France
15:00 WEST (UTC+01:00)	Libérati 11'	Report	Magnozzi 43'; Costantino 52'	Stadium: Stade Olympique Yves-du-Manoir; Attendance: 45,000; Referee: René Mercet (Switzerland)

8 May 1932 1931–32 Central European International Cup	Hungary	1–1	Italy	Budapest, Hungary
15:00 CET (UTC+01:00)	Toldi 44' (pen.)	Report	Costantino 4'	Stadium: Hidegkuti Nándor Stadium; Attendance: 40,000; Referee: Sophus Hansen (Denmark)

28 October 1932 1931–32 Central European International Cup	Czechoslovakia	2–1	Italy	Prague, Czechoslovakia
15:00 CET (UTC+01:00)	Bradáč 28'; Nejedlý 59'	Report	Ferrari 54'	Stadium: Strahov Stadium; Attendance: 31,000; Referee: Peco Bauwens (Germany)

27 November 1932 International friendly	Italy	4–2	Hungary	Milan, Italy
14:30 CET (UTC+01:00)	Orsi 26', 35'; Meazza 52'; Ferrari 79'	Report	Béla 40' (pen.); Markos 86'	Stadium: San Siro; Attendance: 32,000; Referee: William Bangerter (Switzerland)

=== 1933 ===
1 January 1933 International friendly	Italy	3–1	Germany	Bologna, Italy
14:30 CET (UTC+01:00)	Meazza 24'; Costantino 27'; Schiavio 58'	Report	Rohr 2'	Stadium: Stadio Littoriale; Attendance: 30,000; Referee: Louis Baert (Belgium)

12 February 1933 International friendly	Belgium	2–3	Italy	Brussels, Belgium
14:30 GMT (UTC±00:00)	Voorhoof 31', 46'	Report	Meazza 26', 88'; Costantino 71'	Stadium: Stade du Jubilé; Attendance: 35,000; Referee: Walter Lewington (England)

2 April 1933 1933–35 Central European International Cup	Switzerland	0–3	Italy	Geneva, Switzerland
15:00 CET (UTC+01:00)		Report	Schiavio 35', 60'; Meazza 75'	Stadium: Parc des Sports; Attendance: 24,000; Referee: Louis Baert (Belgium)

7 May 1933 1933–35 Central European International Cup	Italy	2–0	Czechoslovakia	Florence, Italy
15:30 CET (UTC+01:00)	Ferrari 41'; Schiavio 44'	Report		Stadium: Stadio Comunale Giovanni Berta; Attendance: 25,000; Referee: Louis Baert (Belgium)

13 May 1933 International friendly	Italy	1–1	England	Rome, Italy
15:30 CET (UTC+01:00)	Ferrari 4'	Report	Bastin 54'	Stadium: Stadio Nazionale PNF; Attendance: 50,000; Referee: Peco Bauwens (Germany)

22 October 1933 1933–35 Central European International Cup	Hungary	0–1	Italy	Budapest, Hungary
15:00 CET (UTC+01:00)		Report	Borel 43'	Stadium: Üllői úti stadion Attendance: 38,000; Referee: Stanley Rous (England)

3 December 1933 1933–35 Central European International Cup	Italy	5–2	Switzerland	Florence, Italy
14:30 CET (UTC+01:00)	Ferrari 8'; Pizziolo 44'; Orsi 49'; Meazza 55'; Monti 66'	Report	Bossi 21'; Kielholz 38'	Stadium: Stadio Comunale Giovanni Berta; Attendance: 35,000; Referee: Louis Baert (Belgium)

=== 1934 ===
11 February 1934 1933–35 Central European International Cup	Italy	2–4	Austria	Turin, Italy
15:00 CET (UTC+01:00)	Guaita 48', 50' (pen.)	Report	Zischek 20', 23', 55'; Binder 28'	Stadium: Stadio Municipale Benito Mussolini; Attendance: 54,000; Referee: René Mercet (Switzerland)

25 March 1934 1934 FIFA World Cup qualification Group 3	Italy	4–0	Greece	Milan, Italy
15:00 CET (UTC+01:00)	Guarisi 40'; Meazza 44', 71'; Ferrari 69'	Report		Stadium: San Siro; Attendance: 20,000; Referee: René Mercet (Switzerland)

27 May 1934 1934 FIFA World Cup; First round	Italy	7–1	United States	Rome, Italy
16:30 CET (UTC+01:00)	Schiavio 18', 29', 64'; Orsi 20', 69'; Ferrari 63'; Meazza 90'	Report	Donelli 57'	Stadium: Stadio Nazionale PNF; Attendance: 25,000; Referee: René Mercet (Switzerland)

31 May 1934 1934 FIFA World Cup; Quarter-final	Italy	1–1 (a.e.t.)	Spain	Florence, Italy
16:30 CET (UTC+01:00)	Ferrari 44'	Report	Regueiro 30'	Stadium: Stadio Giovanni Berta; Attendance: 35,000; Referee: Louis Baert (Belgium)

1 June 1934 1934 FIFA World Cup; Quarter-final (replay)	Italy	1–0	Spain	Florence, Italy
16:30 CET (UTC+01:00)	Meazza 11'	Report		Stadium: Stadio Giovanni Berta; Attendance: 43,000; Referee: René Mercet (Switzerland)

3 June 1934 1934 FIFA World Cup; Semi-final	Italy	1–0	Austria	Milan, Italy
16:30 CET (UTC+01:00)	Guaita 19'	Report		Stadium: San Siro; Attendance: 35,000; Referee: Ivan Eklind (Sweden)

10 June 1934 1934 FIFA World Cup; Final	Italy	2–1 (a.e.t.)	Czechoslovakia	Rome, Italy
17:30 CET (UTC+01:00)	Orsi 81'; Schiavio 95'	Report	Puč 71'	Stadium: Stadio Nazionale PNF; Attendance: 55,000; Referee: Ivan Eklind (Sweden)

14 November 1934 International friendly	England	3–2	Italy	London, England
14:30 GMT (UTC±00:00)	Brook 3', 10'; Drake 12'	Report	Meazza 58', 62'	Stadium: Arsenal Stadium; Attendance: 61,000; Referee: Otto Olsson (Sweden)

9 December 1934 International friendly	Italy	4–2	Hungary	Milan, Italy
14:30 CET (UTC+01:00)	Guaita 27', 37'; Ferrari 63'; Meazza 83'	Report	Sárosi 18'; Avar 39'	Stadium: San Siro; Attendance: 45,000; Referee: Alois Beranek (Austria)

=== 1935 ===
17 February 1935 International friendly	Italy	2–1	France	Rome, Italy
14:30 CET (UTC+01:00)	Meazza 5', 15'	Report	Keller 27'	Stadium: Stadio Nazionale PNF; Attendance: 23,000; Referee: Louis Baert (Belgium)

24 March 1935 1933–35 Central European International Cup	Austria	0–2	Italy	Wien, Austria
15:00 CET (UTC+01:00)		Report	Piola 51', 81'	Stadium: Ernst-Happel-Stadion; Attendance: 60,000; Referee: Walter Lewington (England)

27 October 1935 1933–35 Central European International Cup	Czechoslovakia	2–1	Italy	Prague, Czechoslovakia
14:00 CET (UTC+01:00)	Horák 52', 80'	Report	Pitto 75'	Stadium: Strahov Stadium; Attendance: 12,000; Referee: Pedro Escartín (Spain)

24 November 1935 1933–35 Central European International Cup	Italy	2–2	Hungary	Milan, Italy
14:30 CET (UTC+01:00)	Colaussi 69'; Ferrari 70'	Report	Sárosi 43', 79'	Stadium: Arena Civica; Attendance: 45,000; Referee: Hans Wuthrich (Switzerland)

=== 1936 ===
5 April 1936 International friendly	Switzerland	1–2	Italy	Zürich, Switzerland
15:00 CET (UTC+01:00)	Weiler 77' (pen.)	Report	Demaría 44'; Colaussi 67'	Stadium: Hardturm; Attendance: 18,000; Referee: Mihály Ivanicsics (Hungary)

17 May 1936 International friendly	Italy	2–2	Austria	Rome, Italy
16:00 CET (UTC+01:00)	Demaría 64'; Pasinati 78'	Report	Jerusalem 28'; Viertl 72'	Stadium: Stadio Nazionale PNF; Attendance: 20,000; Referee: Hertzka Pál (Hungary)

31 May 1936 International friendly	Hungary	1–2	Italy	Budapest, Hungary
16:00 CET (UTC+01:00)	Turay 70'	Report	Pasinati 31'; Meazza 77'	Stadium: Hidegkuti Nándor Stadium; Attendance: 32,000; Referee: Adolf Miesz (Austria)

3 August 1936 1936 Summer Olympics; First round	Italy	1–0	United States	Berlin, Germany
15:00 CET (UTC+01:00)	Frossi 58'	Report		Stadium: Poststadion; Attendance: 9,000; Referee: Carl Weingartner (Germany)

7 August 1936 1936 Summer Olympics; Quarter-final	Italy	8–0	Japan	Berlin, Germany
15:00 CET (UTC+01:00)	Frossi 14', 75', 80'; Biagi 32', 57', 81', 82'; Cappelli 89'	Report		Stadium: Mommsenstadion; Attendance: 10,000; Referee: Otto Ohlsson (Sweden)

10 August 1936 1936 Summer Olympics; Semi-final	Italy	2–1 (a.e.t.)	Norway	Berlin, Germany
15:00 CET (UTC+01:00)	Negro 15'; Frossi 96'	Report	Brustad 58'	Stadium: Olympic Stadium; Attendance: 90,000; Referee: Pál von Hertzka (Hungary)

15 August 1936 1936 Summer Olympics; Final	Italy	2–1 (a.e.t.)	Austria	Berlin, Germany
15:00 CET (UTC+01:00)	Frossi 70', 92'	Report	Kainberger 80'	Stadium: Olympic Stadium; Attendance: 90,000; Referee: Peco Bauwens (Germany)

25 October 1936 1936–38 Central European International Cup	Italy	4–2	Switzerland	Milan, Italy
15:00 CET (UTC+01:00)	Meazza 26'; Piola 37', 53'; Pasinati 60'	Report	Bickel 31'; Diebold 76'	Stadium: San Siro; Attendance: 40,000; Referee: Peco Bauwens (Germany)

15 November 1936 International friendly	Germany	2–2	Italy	Berlin, Germany
14:30 CET (UTC+01:00)	Siffling 35', 40'	Report	Colaussi 2'; Ferrari 52'	Stadium: Olympic Stadium; Attendance: 83,000; Referee: Rudolf Eklöw (Sweden)

13 December 1936 International friendly	Italy	2–0	Czechoslovakia	Genoa, Italy
14:30 CET (UTC+01:00)	Pasinati 40'; Ferrari 43'	Report		Stadium: Stadio Luigi Ferraris; Attendance: 25,000; Referee: Adolf Miesz (Austria)

=== 1937 ===
21 March 1937 1936–38 Central European International Cup	Austria	2–0	Italy	Wien, Austria
15:00 CET (UTC+01:00)	Jerusalem 40'; Stroh 63' (pen.)	Match abandoned		Stadium: Ernst-Happel-Stadion; Attendance: 52,000; Referee: Carl Olsson (Sweden)
Note: Match abandoned after 74 minutes following crowd trouble. The result was declared void but the Austrian players were still credited with international caps.

25 April 1937 1936–38 Central European International Cup	Italy	2–0	Hungary	Turin, Italy
15:00 CET (UTC+01:00)	Colaussi 33'; Frossi 81'	Report		Stadium: Stadio Municipale Benito Mussolini; Attendance: 28,000; Referee: William Bangerter (Switzerland)

23 May 1937 1936–38 Central European International Cup	Czechoslovakia	0–1	Italy	Prague, Czechoslovakia
16:00 CET (UTC+01:00)		Report	Piola 24'	Stadium: Generali Arena; Attendance: 30,000; Referee: Peco Bauwens (Germany)

27 May 1937 International friendly	Norway	1–3	Italy	Oslo, Norway
15:00 CET (UTC+01:00)	Danielsen 76'	Report	Meazza 14'; Piola 20', 54'	Stadium: Ullevaal Stadion; Attendance: 17,000; Referee: Alfred Birlem (Germany)

31 October 1937 1936–38 Central European International Cup	Switzerland	2–2	Italy	Geneva, Switzerland
15:00 CET (UTC+01:00)	Walaschek 17' (pen.); Wagner 23'	Report	Piola 5', 85'	Stadium: Charmilles Stadium; Attendance: 25,000; Referee: Walter Lewington (England)

5 December 1937 International friendly	France	0–0	Italy	Paris, France
14:30 WET (UTC±00:00)		Report		Stadium: Parc des Princes; Attendance: 40,000; Referee: Hans Wuthrich (Switzerland)

=== 1938 ===
15 May 1938 International friendly	Italy	6–1	Belgium	Milan, Italy
16:00 CET (UTC+01:00)	Meazza 17' (pen.); Andreolo 28'; Pasinati 58'; Piola 71', 80', 84'	Report	Capelle 2'	Stadium: San Siro; Attendance: 25,000; Referee: Peco Bauwens (Germany)

22 May 1938 International friendly	Italy	4–0	Yugoslavia	Genoa, Italy
16:00 CET (UTC+01:00)	Colaussi 6'; Piola 12'; Meazza 62' (pen.); Ferrari 84'	Report		Stadium: Stadio Luigi Ferraris; Attendance: 25,000; Referee: Alfred Birlem (Germany)

5 June 1938 1938 FIFA World Cup; First round	Italy	2–1 (a.e.t.)	Norway	Marseille, France
17:00 WEST (UTC+01:00)	Ferraris 2'; Piola 94'	Report	Brustad 83'	Stadium: Stade Vélodrome; Attendance: 19,000; Referee: Alois Beranek (Germany)

12 June 1938 1938 FIFA World Cup; Quarter-final	France	1–3	Italy	Paris, France
17:00 WEST (UTC+01:00)	Heisserer 10'	Report	Colaussi 9'; Piola 51', 72'	Stadium: Stade Olympique de Colombes; Attendance: 58,455; Referee: Louis Baert (Belgium)

16 June 1938 1938 FIFA World Cup; Semi-final	Italy	2–1	Brazil	Marseille, France
18:00 WEST (UTC+01:00)	Colaussi 51'; Meazza 60' (pen.)	Report	Romeu 87'	Stadium: Stade Vélodrome; Attendance: 33,000; Referee: Hans Wuthrich (Switzerland)

19 June 1938 1938 FIFA World Cup; Final	Hungary	2–4	Italy	Paris, France
17:00 WEST (UTC+01:00)	Titkos 8'; Sárosi 70'	Report	Colaussi 6', 35'; Piola 16', 82'	Stadium: Stade Olympique de Colombes; Attendance: 45,000; Referee: Georges Capdeville (France)

20 November 1938 International friendly	Italy	2–0	Switzerland	Bologna, Italy
14:30 CET (UTC+01:00)	Colaussi 27'; Minelli 60' (o.g.)	Report		Stadium: Stadio Littoriale; Attendance: 20,000; Referee: Louis Baert (Belgium)

4 December 1938 International friendly	Italy	1–0	France	Naples, Italy
14:30 CET (UTC+01:00)	Biavati 32'	Report		Stadium: Stadio Giorgio Ascarelli; Attendance: 40,000; Referee: John Langenus (Belgium)

=== 1939 ===
26 March 1939 International friendly	Italy	3–2	Germany	Florence, Italy
14:30 CET (UTC+01:00)	Piola 9', 48'; Biavati 35'	Report	Hahnemann 28'; Janes 80'	Stadium: Stadio Comunale Giovanni Berta; Attendance: 25,000; Referee: Louis Baert (Belgium)

13 May 1939 International friendly	Italy	2–2	England	Milan, Italy
15:00 CET (UTC+01:00)	Biavati 49'; Piola 64'	Report	Lawton 19'; Hall 77'	Stadium: San Siro; Attendance: 60,000; Referee: Peco Bauwens (Germany)

4 June 1939 International friendly	Yugoslavia	1–2	Italy	Belgrade, Kingdom of Yugoslavia
15:00 CET (UTC+01:00)	Petrović 64'	Report	Piola 35'; Colaussi 61'	Stadium: Stadion Beogradski S.K. Attendance: 35,000; Referee: John Langenus (Belgium)

8 June 1939 International friendly	Hungary	1–3	Italy	Budapest, Hungary
15:00 CET (UTC+01:00)	Kiszely 77'	Report	Piola 2'; Colaussi 59', 65'	Stadium: Üllői úti stadion Attendance: 36,000; Referee: Thomas Thompson (England)

11 June 1939 International friendly	Romania	0–1	Italy	Bucharest, Romania
17:30 EEST (UTC+03:00)		Report	Colaussi 32'	Stadium: Stadionul Oficiul Național de Educație Fizică; Attendance: 28,000; Referee: Alois Beranek (Austria)

20 July 1939 International friendly	Finland	2–3	Italy	Helsinki, Finland
17:00 EET (UTC+02:00)	Lehtonen 21'; Weckström 41'	Report	Piola 12', 28', 84'	Stadium: Helsinki Olympic Stadium; Attendance: 15,547; Referee: Ivan Eklind (Sweden)

12 November 1939 International friendly	Switzerland	3–1	Italy	Zürich, Switzerland
14:30 CET (UTC+01:00)	Monnard 5'; Aeby 61', 88'	Report	Puricelli 28'	Stadium: Hardturm; Attendance: 10,000; Referee: Louis Baert (Belgium)

26 November 1939 International friendly	Germany	5–2	Italy	Berlin, Germany
14:30 CET (UTC+01:00)	Binder 21', 36', 85'; Lehner 67'; Conen 70'	Report	Neri 15'; Demaría 27' (pen.)	Stadium: Olympiastadion; Attendance: 70,000; Referee: Pedro Escartín (Spain)

=== 1940 ===
3 March 1940 International friendly	Italy	1–1	Switzerland	Turin, Italy
14:30 CET (UTC+01:00)	Corbelli 36'	Report	Bickel 20'	Stadium: Stadio Municipale Benito Mussolini; Attendance: 40,805; Referee: Alois Beranek (Austria)

14 April 1940 International friendly	Italy	2–1	Romania	Rome, Italy
15:00 CET (UTC+01:00)	Biavati 61'; Piola 78'	Report	Baratky 47'	Stadium: Stadio Nazionale PNF; Attendance: 25,000; Referee: Alois Beranek (Austria)

5 May 1940 International friendly	Italy	3–2	Germany	Milan, Italy
15:00 CET (UTC+01:00)	Colaussi 17'; Bertoni 25'; Biavati 58'	Report	Binder 28', 52'	Stadium: San Siro; Attendance: 65,000; Referee: Mihály Ivanicsics (Hungary)

1 December 1940 International friendly	Italy	1–1	Hungary	Genoa, Italy
14:00 CET (UTC+01:00)	Trevisan 14'	Report	Bodola 62'	Stadium: Stadio Luigi Ferraris; Attendance: 30,000; Referee: Peco Bauwens (Germany)

=== 1942 ===
5 April 1942 International friendly	Italy	4–0	(Independent State of Croatia) Croatia	Genoa, Italy
15:45 CEST (UTC+02:00)	Gabetto 55'; Ferraris 58'; Biavati 64'; Grezar 68' (pen.)	Report		Stadium: Stadio Luigi Ferraris; Attendance: 25,000; Referee: Helmut Finck (Germany)

19 April 1942 International friendly	Italy	4–0	Spain	Milan, Italy
15:00 CEST (UTC+02:00)	V. Mazzola 48'; Ferraris 49'; Piola 87'; Loik 88'	Report		Stadium: San Siro; Attendance: 55,000; Referee: Peco Bauwens (Germany)

=== 1945 ===
11 November 1945 International friendly	Switzerland	4–4	Italy	Zürich, Switzerland
15:00 CET (UTC+01:00)	Amadò 25', 37', 84'; Aeby 78'	Report	Piola 3'; Loik 47'; Biavati 63', 69'	Stadium: Hardturm; Attendance: 23,000; Referee: Victor Sdez (France)

=== 1946 ===
1 December 1946 International friendly	Italy	3–2	Austria	Milan, Italy
14:30 CET (UTC+01:00)	Castigliano 8'; V. Mazzola 16'; Piola 64'	Report	Epp 40'; Stojaspal 90'	Stadium: Stadio San Siro; Attendance: 53,000; Referee: Eugenio Scherz (Switzerland)

=== 1947 ===
27 April 1947 International friendly	Italy	5–2	Switzerland	Florence, Italy
16:00 CEST (UTC+02:00)	V. Mazzola 12'; Loik 35'; Menti 58', 60', 88'	Report	Fatton 23'; Bocquet 69' (pen.)	Stadium: Stadio Comunale; Attendance: 48,000; Referee: Johann Beck (Austria)

11 May 1947 International friendly	Italy	3–2	Hungary	Turin, Italy
16:00 CEST (UTC+02:00)	Gabetto 24', 70'; Loik 35'	Report	Szusza 52'; Puskás 76' (pen.)	Stadium: Stadio Comunale; Attendance: 73,000; Referee: Paul von Wartburg (Switzerland)

9 November 1947 International friendly	Austria	5–1	Italy	Vienna, Austria
14:30 CET (UTC+01:00)	Körner 24'; Ocwirk 31'; Brinek, Jr. 36', 89'; Stojaspal 69'	Report	Carapellese 89'	Stadium: Praterstadion; Attendance: 60,000; Referee: Jan Roškota (Czechoslovakia)

14 December 1947 International friendly	Italy	3–1	Czechoslovakia	Bari, Italy
14:30 CET (UTC+01:00)	Menti 10'; Gabetto 58'; Carapellese 63'	Report	Říha 84'	Stadium: Stadio della Vittoria; Attendance: 60,000; Referee: Alois Beranek (Austria)

=== 1948 ===
4 April 1948 International friendly	France	1–3	Italy	Colombes, France
15:00 CET (UTC+01:00)	Baratte 71' (pen.)	Report	Carapellese 31', 38'; Gabetto 36'	Stadium: Stade Olympique Yves-du-Manoir; Attendance: 60,074; Referee: Arthur Edward Ellis (England)

16 May 1948 International friendly	Italy	0–4	England	Turin, Italy
17:00 CEST (UTC+02:00)		Report	Mortensen 4'; Lawton 23'; Finney 72', 72'	Stadium: Stadio Comunale; Attendance: 58,000; Referee: Pedro Escartín (Spain)

2 August 1948 1948 Summer Olympics; First round	Italy	9–0	United States	Brentford, England
18:30 BST (UTC+01:00)	Pernigo 2', 57', 88', 90'; Stellin 25' (pen.); Turconi 46'; Cavigioli 72', 87'; Caprile 90'	Report		Stadium: Griffin Park; Attendance: 20,000; Referee: Charles de la Salle (France)

5 August 1948 1948 Summer Olympics; Quarter-final	Denmark	5–3	Italy	Highbury, England
18:30 BST (UTC+01:00)	John Hansen 30', 53', 74', 82'; Pløger 84'	Report	Cavigioli 49'; Caprile 67'; Pernigo 81'	Stadium: Arsenal Stadium; Attendance: 25,000; Referee: William Ling (England)

=== 1949 ===
27 February 1949^{1} International friendly	Italy	4–1	Portugal	Genoa, Italy
14:30 CET (UTC+01:00)	Menti 57'; Carapellese 67'; V. Mazzola 75'; Maroso 81'	Report	Lourenço 21'	Stadium: Stadio Luigi Ferraris; Attendance: 60,000; Referee: Victor Sdez (France)

27 March 1949 International friendly	Spain	1–3	Italy	Madrid, Spain
14:30 CET (UTC+01:00)	Gaínza 34' (pen.)	Report	Lorenzi 9'; Carapellese 48'; Amadei 50'	Stadium: Estadio Chamartín; Attendance: 80,000; Referee: William Ling (England)

22 May 1949 1948–53 Central European International Cup	Italy	3–1	Austria	Florence, Italy
16:30 CET (UTC+01:00)	Cappello 26'; Amadei 42'; Boniperti 43'	Report	Huber 70'	Stadium: Stadio Comunale; Attendance: 85,000; Referee: Jean Lutz (Switzerland)

12 June 1949 1948–53 Central European International Cup	Hungary	1–1	Italy	Budapest, Hungary
16:30 CEST (UTC+02:00)	Deák 29'	Report	Carapellese 70'	Stadium: Megyeri úti stadion Attendance: 45,000; Referee: William Evans (England)

30 November 1949 International friendly	England	2–0	Italy	Tottenham, England
14:15 GMT (UTC±00:00)	Rowley 29'; Wright 42'	Report		Stadium: White Hart Lane; Attendance: 71,797; Referee: Jack Mowat (Scotland)

^{1}Indicates new coach
