= Vittorio Pozzo =

Italian football manager (1886–1968)

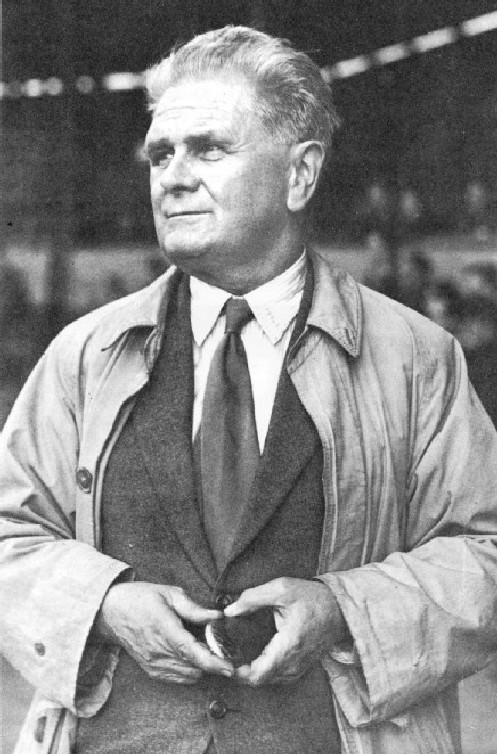
- Pozzo as Torino manager, c. 1934

Personal information
- Date of birth: 2 March 1886
- Place of birth: Turin, Kingdom of Italy
- Date of death: 21 December 1968 (aged 82)
- Place of death: Turin, Italy
- Position: Midfielder

Senior career*
Years	Team	Apps	(Gls)
1905–1906	Grasshoppers	20	(3)
1906–1911	Torino	52	(9)

Managerial career
- 1912: Italy
- 1912–1922: Torino
- 1921: Italy
- 1924: Italy
- 1924–1926: AC Milan
- 1929–1948: Italy
Medal record
Men's football
Representing Italy (as manager)
FIFA World Cup
Winner	1934 Italy
Winner	1938 France
Olympic Games
Gold medal – first place	1936 Berlin
European International Cup
Winner	1927–30
Winner	1933–35
Runner-up	1931–32
- * Club domestic league appearances and goals

Vittorio Pozzo (Italian pronunciation: [vitˈtɔːrjo ˈpottso]; 2 March 1886 – 21 December 1968) was an Italian football player, manager and journalist.

The creator of the Metodo tactical formation, Pozzo is regarded as one of the greatest managers of all time, and is the only manager to guide a national team to two FIFA World Cup titles as coach, leading the Italy national team to victory in the 1934 and 1938 FIFA World Cups. Nicknamed Il Vecchio Maestro ("The Old Master"), he also led Italy to a gold medal at the 1936 Olympic football tournament, becoming the only manager to win both Olympic Games and World Cup, and managed the Italian championship squads of the 1930 and 1935 editions of the European International Cup.

== Early life ==
Vittorio Pozzo was born in Turin, Italy on 2 March 1886, into a family originally from Ponderano. He attended the Liceo Cavour in Turin, his hometown; he later studied languages and played football in France, Switzerland and England. He studied in Manchester at the turn of the 20th century and met Manchester United half-back Charlie Roberts and Derby County's inside-left Steve Bloomer.

== Playing career ==
As a player, Pozzo played professionally in Switzerland for Grasshoppers the 1905–06 season, before returning to Italy where he helped found Torino (then "Foot-Ball Club Torino"), a team with which he played for five seasons until retiring from football in 1911. He would serve as the technical director of Torino from 1912 to 1922. After completing his studies, he joined Pirelli, where he became manager, a position he would leave for the Italian national team.

== Coaching career ==
=== Early career ===
Until the 1912 Summer Olympics, the Italy national team was guided by "technical commissions", when Pozzo was appointed as the first head coach of the national team during the debut of an Italian selection in an official competition. Italy was eliminated in the first round after a 3–2 loss to Finland in extra time, on 29 June. Pozzo resigned after his third match, being defeated 5–1 by Austria in the consolation tournament, on 3 July. He returned to work at Pirelli; only to return to the national team in 1921 as part of a "technical commission", a committee composed of federal managers, referees, players, former players, coaches and journalists.

Throughout his first term, the national team was guided by this diverse group of people. With the brief exception of Augusto Rangone (in 1925–1928) and Carlo Carcano (1928–1929), Pozzo was the only person to play the role of sole commissioner until the sixties. Pozzo would also serve with the Alpini as lieutenant during the First World War.

In 1921, Pozzo was commissioned by the Football Association to study a draft reform of the league to address the tensions between the bigger and the smaller teams, because it was thought that the number of participants in the championship had to be reduced. The mediation failed resulting in the split between the FIGC and CCI, before merging again the following year.

In 1924, for the occasion of the 1924 Summer Olympics, Pozzo was again appointed sole head coach. This time Italy were able to reach the quarter-finals, where they were defeated 2–1 by Switzerland. After this defeat, Pozzo resigned and returned to devote himself to his work and his wife, who shortly after died due to a disease. After the death of his wife, he moved to Milan, where he held his job at Pirelli, alongside his work as a journalist for La Stampa in Turin, which he continued almost until his death.

=== Successes with Italy during the 1930s ===
==== First Central European International Cup title ====
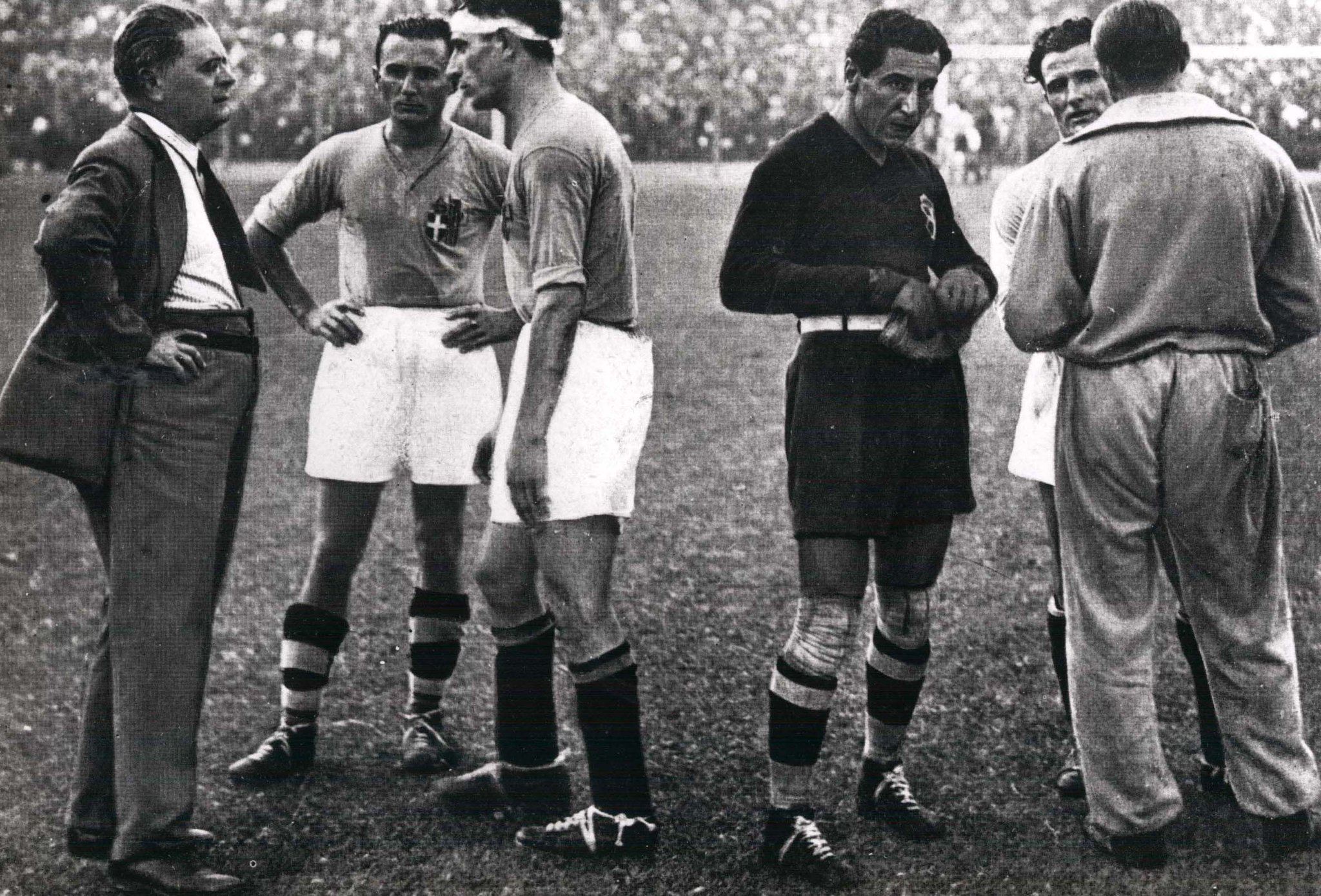
Pozzo (left), Italy's manager at the 1934 FIFA World Cup, gives directions to Monzeglio and Bertolini before the start of extra-time in the victorious final versus Czechoslovakia.

Pozzo returned to coach the Italy national team on a permanent basis in December 1929. Italy won the 1930 edition of the Central European International Cup, defeating Hungary 5–0 in Budapest. They pipped the title from Meisl's Austrian side, the so-called Wunderteam, who went on to win the second edition of the tournament two years later.

Following the 1930 defeat to Spain, Pozzo left Adolfo Baloncieri, who had served as Italy captain and who had been an international of ten years standing, out of the team. In the 1932 edition of the Central European International Cup, Italy finished in second place behind Austria; Austria beat Italy, as did the Czechs, while a defeat to Hungary was only averted because of a missed penalty. This led to Pozzo bringing back the Bologna player Angelo Schiavio, who had been a regular goalscorer for his club, but in February 1934 with the World Cup looming Austria defeated Italy in Turin 4–2, Pozzo once again axed the team's captain, Umberto Caligaris, on this occasion.

==== 1934 World Cup ====
During the 1934 FIFA World Cup on home soil, the first tournament on the European continent, Pozzo's Italian side benefited from controversial officiating, which was thought to have been influenced by the political situation in Italy at the time; indeed, the Italian fascist dictator Benito Mussolini had apparently met with several officials prior to Italy's matches, including Ivan Eklind, who refereed Italy's semi-final and final victories. Eklind was later accused of favouring the Italians with his decisions. Italy's game against Spain in the quarter-finals, which ended in a 1–1 draw after extra-time, also raised questions against the performance of the referee Louis Baert in the match; in the replay, Swiss referee Rene Mercet did not escape criticism either, and was banned by the Swiss FA upon his arrival home. Both matches were played in a highly aggressive manner, with several players of both sides injured as a result of the extremely physical play: a foul on goalkeeper Ricardo Zamora for the equaliser in the first leg went unpunished, which ruled him out of the replay, while another on his replacement Joan Josep Nogués in the replay was also ignored; at least three Spaniards had to depart the field with injuries. The Italian Mario Pizziolo also suffered a broken leg at the hand of the Spaniards in the first leg, and would not play for the Italian national team again. Italy's 1–0 victory in the replay ultimately earned them a place in the semi-finals. Italy also benefited from the quarter-final draw between Hungary and Austria, which saw Austria prevail 2–1 in a highly competitive encounter. By the time of the semi-final, Johann Horvath was absent through injury, and Italy won the match over Austria by a single goal. Enrique Guaita, one of the squad's Oriundi, scored the only goal of the match from close range after Giuseppe Meazza had fallen over goalkeeper Peter Platzer. In the final on 10 June, at the Stadio Nazionale PNF in Rome, with temperatures surpassing 40 °C (104 °F), Italy came from behind to defeat Czechoslovakia 2–1 in extra-time to win the title. On the back of the World Cup success, Pozzo was awarded the title of Commendatore for achieving greatness in his profession.

==== The Battle of Highbury, second Central European International Cup title, and 1936 Olympics ====
Pozzo also coached Italy in the Battle of Highbury on 14 November 1934 against England, led by Arsenal's Wilf Copping at the team's home ground, which ended 3–2 in favour of England.

Italy defended their Central European International Cup title in 1935 under Pozzo, going into the 1936 Summer Olympics on the back of a run which had seen them lose only to Austria and England; they went on to win the gold medal in the tournament, defeating Austria 2–1 in extra time.

==== 1938 World Cup ====
By the time of the 1938 World Cup in France, Italy remained undefeated in recent competitions under Pozzo. Silvio Piola earned his first cap in 1935, scoring regularly for the national side and proving an effective partner for Meazza. In the quarter-finals against the hosts in Colombes, as both teams normally played in blue, Italy were controversially ordered to play in all-black attire (possibly by Mussolini himself), a colour which is associated with fascism, along with bearing a Fascio Littorio on the left breast, alongside the Savoy shield. Despite a hostile reception from the home crowd, Italy managed to win the match 3–1 and advance to the next round. Following the match, Pozzo learned that the Brazilians were so confident of appearing in the final in Paris that they had requisitioned the only airplane from Marseille to Paris on the day after the semi-final against Pozzo's Italy. Pozzo went to the Brazilians that sunbathed in the Côte d'Azur and asked them to surrender him the aerial bookings in case of an Italian victory. The Brazilians apparently arrogantly answered "it is not possible because we will go to Paris, because we will beat you in Marseille". They then reportedly offered Pozzo the ironic hospitality of a plane ride to Paris to see them play in the final. Pozzo reported to the Italian side what the Brazilians had told him to rouse the pride of the players. It was the psychological premise for revenge in the match, which Italy went on to win 2–1. Afterwards, the Brazilians did not want to sell their plane tickets to the Italians, who were then forced to reach Paris by train. In the resulting final, Italy duly won their second world title 4–2 against Hungary. There is a common legend that the Italian fascist dictator Benito Mussolini sent a telegram to the Italian team prior to the final, stating: "Win or die!"; however, Pietro Rava later denied this, commenting: "No, no, no, that's not true. He sent a telegram wishing us well, but no never 'win or die'." With the 1938 World Cup victory, Pozzo became the first ever manager to win two editions of the FIFA World Cup coaching one same team, a feat that has yet to be matched in men's international football, and which would stand until the 2019 FIFA Women's World Cup, when Jill Ellis became the second international manager to do so as coach of the United States women's team.

Between 1938 and 1939, Pozzo held the record for most consecutive wins for Italy, with nine, until the record was eventually broken in 2019 by Roberto Mancini. From 24 November 1935 against Hungary until 20 July 1939 against Finland, Pozzo also led Italy on a record 30-match unbeaten streak, until it was surpassed in 2021.

=== Later coaching career (1939–1948) ===
During World War II, Pozzo remained in position throughout the hostilities. At the 1948 Summer Olympics, Pozzo's last match as Italy head coach came as a 5–3 defeat to Denmark in the quarter-finals at Highbury in London. Pozzo finished with a record of 63 wins, 17 draws and 16 defeats from 95 matches (an additional two wins were recorded as part of a technical commission in 1921). He holds the record for the longest reign of any European men's senior national team coach.

His last, excruciating, official act, in 1949, was helping with the recognition of the torn bodies of the players of the Grande Torino team, his friends and pupils, who died on 4 May in the Superga air disaster from which he escaped himself for not being able to go with the team to Lisbon.

== Style of management ==
=== The Metodo system ===
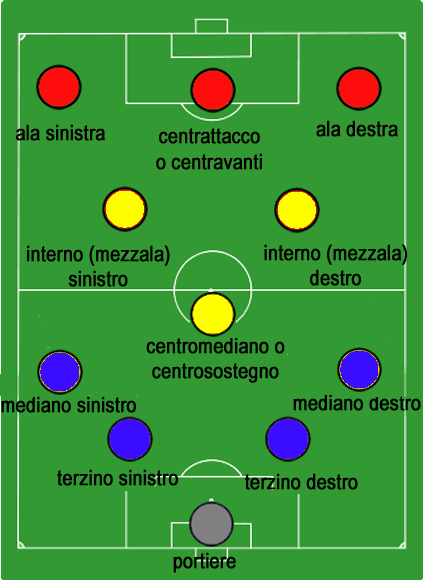
The Metodo of Vittorio Pozzo

Until the 1930s, a common tactic in football was the so-called pyramid of Cambridge, which is a 2–3–5 in the shape of an inverted pyramid that had its apex in the Keeper. The design of this scheme is given to the team of the famous British university, and its launch is due to Blackburn Rovers, who applied it for the first time in the 1890s, and won five league cups. For over 30 years this form experienced uninterrupted luck in the British Isles and, by extension, the world. In the years after World War I, by evolution, from the pyramid, two tactical systems originated simultaneously: the WM, or 'sistema', practiced by the Arsenal side of Herbert Chapman, and the 'metodo', whose fathers are commonly identified as Vittorio Pozzo and his friend and rival Hugo Meisl, who served as the manager of the Austria national football team for 25 years.

Pozzo and Meisl developed the idea of an array with two defenders as full-backs and a player in a central position in front of the defence, between the two half-backs, who effectively functioned as a central or defensive midfielder, who was a key component of the system; this position was known as that of the centre-half-back, or centromediano metodista in Italian, and was seen as a precursor to the regista or deep-lying playmaker role, as the metodista's responsibilities in Pozzo's system were not entirely defensive but also creative. As such, the metodista was not solely tasked with breaking down possession, but also with starting attacking plays after winning back the ball. Compared to the sistema, the forward displacement of the central defender gave more support to the half-backs. Finally, the retreat towards the median of the two 'inside forwards' of the pyramid (also called "mezzali", or "half-wings", in Italian – not to be confused with wing half-backs) gave rise to a formation of the type 2–3–2–3, or "WW", because it repeated the form of these letters on the field. The metodo system was well–suited to highly technical teams whose strategies were predominantly based on a slower game made up of possession and much short passing on the ground, in contrast to the English sistema, which favoured faster, more aggressive, and athletic gameplay.

Pozzo was also known to be a pioneer in his use of pre-tournament training camps. He is regarded as one of the greatest managers of all time.

=== Oriundi ===
The other matter that Pozzo benefited from was the oriundi (that is foreign-born Italian 'nationals') which permitted Italy to take advantage of those players from other countries who could claim some type of Italian ancestry. In the 1930s he was able to call on Luis Monti, a midfielder who had appeared for Argentina in their 1930 FIFA World Cup Final defeat to Uruguay, and who was an important part of the success of the Italian team in the 1934 World Cup.

In response to the criticisms surrounding his decision to call upon oriundi players in the victorious World Cup of 1934, he said: "If they can die for Italy, they can also play for Italy", referring to the fact that they had also served in the Italian army.

He was also a fan of Raimundo Orsi, an Argentinian from Buenos Aires after an undistinguished stint in the Argentinian shirt. Orsi, never a prolific goalscorer, would reward Pozzo's faith with a goal in the 1934 World Cup final. Not that he dispensed with home-grown talent, but his penchant for attacking play is demonstrated by the fact that as well as Schiavio, Pozzo was successful in converting Giuseppe Meazza, who was captain in 1938, from a striker into an inside forward; indeed Pozzo's reign is linked closely to the success of his strikers. In the 1938 World Cup another 'oriundo' was the Uruguayan Michele Andreolo.

== Controversies ==
Brian Glanville has stated that Pozzo was not a fascist. During the 1934 World Cup campaign, he did, however, work alongside Giorgio Vaccaro, a general from the fascist militia, who was also the head of the Italian Football Federation. According to Gian Paolo Ormezzano, Pozzo was neither a fascist nor anti-fascist, while Giorgio Bocca considered him to be an officer of the Alpini and a reluctant fascist of the regime by association, "...one who appreciated punctual trains, but could not stand squadrismi, who paid homage to the monument dedicated to the Alpini, but not to the fascists' memorials." Following the Second World War, however, Pozzo was excluded from Italian football, due to being accused of cooperating with the fascist government, and of participating in the Italian Social Republic; as such, the new Turin stadium was not dedicated to him. Despite his associations with fascism, however, he was not a member of the National Fascist Party, and documents demonstrated that he collaborated with the National Liberation Committee as of September 1943.

The 1938 edition of the FIFA World Cup took place in France, where numerous refugees who had escaped the fascist regime in Italy were strongly against the Italian national team's participation in the tournament. In the first match of the Italian national team, against the Norway national team, among the 22,000 spectators there were 3,000 escaped anti-fascist Italians who opposed "Mussolini's national team", and jeered at them in protest. Pozzo replied to the demonstration with a memorable and highly controversial episode. During the presentation of the teams on the field, the Italian players had made the fascist salute, as it was custom for them to do at the time. As a result, they were overwhelmed by the jeers and whistles of protest from the crowd. Pozzo feared that that reception would demoralise the players. When the whistles diminished, after the players had lowered their arms, Pozzo, who was lined up with the team in the centre of the field, ordered them to perform another fascist salute. He later commented on the incident, stating: "Having won the battle of intimidation, we played."

Pozzo ordered the players to continue with the fascist salute during the national anthem. Afterwards he declared: "The match was immediately surrounded by polemic–political undertones. And unfairly so. Because our players don't even dream of making something political out of this, but the fascist salute is the official flag of the moment, it's a sort of ceremony and they must show allegiance to it. They represent our country, and naturally they wear its colours and insignias with dignity. [...] I have my ideas, but I know what my duty is. When we take to the field, as expected, a solemn attack of deafening hisses and insults attends us. And we don't lower the hand until the hisses are stopped. The action of intimidation has not succeeded".

== After football ==
Pozzo became a journalist with La Stampa after retiring from football management, resuming a career he had worked in prior to his successes as coach of Italy. He reported on the 1950 FIFA World Cup as part of his work covering Italy national team matches.

== Death and legacy ==
Pozzo died on 21 December 1968, at the age of 82. He is buried in the cemetery of his family's hometown, Ponderano. In 1986, the Stadio Communale di Torino was renamed after Pozzo in his honour; the stadium is now known as the Stadio Olimpico Grande Torino. In 2016, a museum featuring his memorabilia in Ponderano was inaugurated in his honour.

== Honours ==
=== Manager ===
Italy

- FIFA World Cup: 1934, 1938
- Central European International Cup: 1927–30, 1933–35
- Men's Olympic football Gold Medal: 1936

=== Individual ===
- Italian Football Hall of Fame: 2011
- World Soccer Magazine 13th Greatest Manager of All Time: 2013

=== Orders ===
- Stella al Merito Sportivo

== See also ==
- Jill Ellis, the first woman manager to win two consecutive FIFA Women's World Cup coaching one team.

== Bibliography ==
- Baker, William Joseph (1988), Sports in the Western World, Urbana, IL: University of Illinois Press, ISBN 978-0-252-06042-7
- Wilson, Jonathan (2009), Inverting the Pyramid: The History of Football Tactics, London: Orion, ISBN 978-1-4091-0204-5
