= Amedeo Biavati =

Italian footballer (1915-1979)

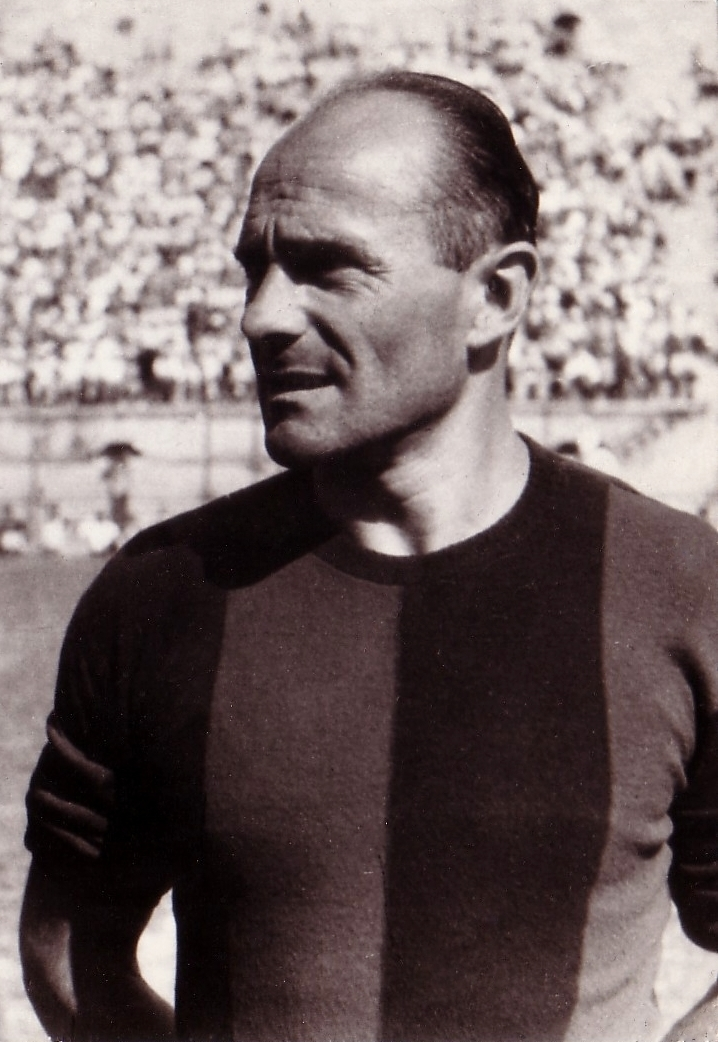
- Biavati as Bologna's captain in 1946

Personal information
- Full name: Amedeo Biavati
- Date of birth: 4 April 1915
- Place of birth: Bologna, Kingdom of Italy
- Date of death: 22 April 1979 (aged 64)
- Place of death: Bologna, Italy
- Positions: Forward; midfielder

Youth career
- 1930–1932: Bologna

Senior career*
| Years | Team | Apps | (Gls) |
| 1934–1935 | Bologna | 16 | (6) |
| 1934–1935 | Catania | 30 | (9) |
| 1935–1947 | Bologna | 203 | (58) |
| 1948–1949 | Reggina | ? | (?) |
| 1949–1950 | Imolese | ? | (3) |
| 1950–1951 | Magenta | ? | (?) |
| 1951–1952 | U.G. Manduria Sport | ? | (?) |
| 1953–1954 | A.S.D. Molfetta | 1+ | (1+) |
| 1954–1955 | Belluno | 9+ | (3+) |

International career
| 1938–1947 | Italy | 18 | (8) |

Managerial career
- 1949–1950: Imolese
- 1950–1951: Magenta
- 1951–1952: U.G. Manduria Sport
- 1953–1954: A.S.D. Molfetta
- 1954–1955: Belluno B
- 19??: Fano
- 19??: Boca San Lazzaro
- 1969–1970: U.S. Rovereto
Medal record
Italy
FIFA World Cup
| Winner | 1938 France |
- * Club domestic league appearances and goals

Amedeo Biavati (Italian pronunciation: [ameˈdɛːo bjaˈvaːti]; 4 April 1915 – 22 April 1979) was an Italian footballer, who was born in Bologna. He was usually deployed as forward or as a midfielder on the wing. A very fast and creative player, with an eye for goal, precise crossing, and excellent technical ability and dribbling skills, Biavati is regarded as one of the greatest Italian players and wingers of all time, and is largely remembered for popularising the use of notable skills and feints in Italian football, in particular the step over.

== Club career ==
Biavati played in Serie A with Bologna, making his debut on 21 May 1933 in a 7–0 win over Casale. He also played with Catania in Serie B. With Bologna he enjoyed a successful period, winning in particular three Serie A titles during the 1936–1937, 1938–1939, and 1940–1941 seasons, as well as the Torneo Internazionale dell'Expo Universale di Parigi in 1937, and the Coppa Alta Italia in 1946.

== International career ==
Biavati made 18 appearances and scored eight goals for the Italy national football team between 1938 and 1947, and he helped the team to win the 1938 FIFA World Cup in France, as well as the third edition of the Central European International Cup. He made his international debut on 12 June 1938, during the quarter-finals of the 1938 World Cup, as Italy defeated the host nation 3–1. Biavati is often remembered for the notable goal he scored against England in Milan, on 13 May 1939, placing the ball into an empty net after dribbling past the English defenders and the goalkeeper.

== Managerial career ==
After retiring, Biavati attempted to pursue a career as a football manager, albeit unsuccessfully.

== Honours ==
=== Club ===
Bologna

- Serie A: 1936–37, 1938–39, 1940–41
- Torneo Internazionale dell'Expo Universale di Parigi: 1937
- Coppa Alta Italia: 1946

=== International ===
Italy

- FIFA World Cup: 1938
- Central European International Cup: 1933–35
