= Corbelli =

Corbelli is an Italian surname. Notable people with the surname include:

- Alessandro Corbelli (born 1952), Italian baritone opera singer
- Guido Corbelli (1913–1994), Italian former professional footballer and manager
- Laurie Corbelli (born 1957), former professional indoor volleyball player
- Vito Corbelli (born 1941), former Sammarinese cyclist
