= 1934 FIFA World Cup =

Association football tournament in Italy

World's Cup Campionato Mondiale di Calcio Italia 1934 (Italian)
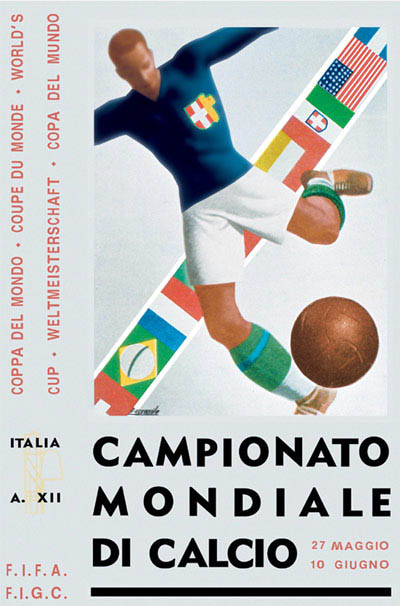
- Official poster

Tournament details
- Host country: Italy
- Dates: 27 May – 10 June
- Teams: 16 (from 4 confederations)
- Venues: 8 (in 8 host cities)

Final positions
- Champions: Italy (1st title)
- Runners-up: Czechoslovakia
- Third place: Germany
- Fourth place: Austria

Tournament statistics
- Matches played: 17
- Goals scored: 70 (4.12 per match)
- Attendance: 363,000 (21,353 per match)
- Top scorer(s): (Czechoslovakia) Oldřich Nejedlý (5 goals)
- Best player: (Italy) Giuseppe Meazza
- Best goalkeeper: (Spain) Ricardo Zamora

The 1934 FIFA World Cup was the 2nd edition of the FIFA World Cup, the quadrennial international football championship for senior men's national teams. It took place in Italy from 27 May to 10 June 1934.

The 1934 World Cup was the first in which teams had to qualify to take part. Thirty-two nations entered the competition; sixteen teams qualified for the final tournament. Reigning champions Uruguay boycotted the tournament as only four European teams had accepted their invitation to the 1930 tournament. Italy beat Czechoslovakia 2–1 to become the second World Cup champions and the first European winners.

The Federale 102 ball, which was manufactured in Italy, was the match ball provided for the 1934 World Cup.

== Host selection ==
After a lengthy decision-making process in which FIFA's executive committee met eight times, Italy was chosen as the host nation at a meeting in Stockholm on 9 October 1932. The executive committee made the decision without a member ballot. The Italian bid was chosen in preference to one from Sweden; the Italian government assigned a budget of Lire 3.5 million to the tournament.

== Qualification and participants ==
For the first time, teams had to play qualifying matches to enter the competition: 32 countries applied to enter the finals tournament, of which 16 qualified. Even so, there were several notable absentees. Reigning World Cup holders Uruguay declined to participate, protesting the refusal of several European countries to travel to South America for the previous World Cup, which Uruguay had hosted in 1930. As a result, the 1934 World Cup is the only one in which the reigning champions did not participate. The British Home Nations, in a period of self-imposed exile from FIFA, also refused to participate, even though FIFA had offered England and Scotland direct entry to the tournament without qualification. Football Association committee member Charles Sutcliffe called the tournament "a joke" and claimed that "the national associations of England, Scotland, Wales and Ireland have quite enough to do in their own International Championship which seems to me a far better World Championship than the one to be staged in Rome".

Despite their role as hosts, Italy still had to qualify, the only time a host needed to do so. The qualifying matches were arranged geographically. Withdrawals by Chile and Peru meant that Argentina and Brazil qualified without playing a single match.

Twelve of the sixteen places were allocated to Europe, three to the Americas, and one to Africa or Asia (including Turkey). Only 10 of the 32 entrants, and 4 of the 16 qualified teams (Brazil, Argentina, United States, and Egypt, the first African team to qualify for a World Cup finals tournament), were from outside Europe. The last place in the finals was contested between the United States and Mexico only three days before the start of the tournament in a one-off match in Rome, which the United States won.

=== List of qualified teams ===
The following 16 teams qualified for the final tournament.

Asia (0)

- None qualified

Africa (1)

- Egypt (debut)

North, Central America and Caribbean (1)

- United States

South America (2)

- Argentina
- Brazil

Europe (12)

- Austria (debut)
- Belgium
- Czechoslovakia (debut)
- France
- Germany (debut)
- Hungary (debut)
- Italy (hosts, debut)
- Netherlands (debut)
- Romania
- Spain (debut)
- Sweden (debut)
- Switzerland (debut)

Ten of these teams made their first World Cup appearance. This included 9 of the 12 European teams (Italy, Germany, Spain, the Netherlands, Hungary, Czechoslovakia, Sweden, Austria, and Switzerland) as well as Egypt. Egypt was the first team from Africa in the finals and did not qualify again until the next time the competition was held in Italy, in 1990.

== Venues ==
The number of supporters travelling from other countries was higher than at any previous football tournament, including 7,000 from the Netherlands and 10,000 each from Austria and Switzerland.

=== Host cities and stadiums ===
Locations of the 1934 FIFA World Cup host cities

List of host cities and stadiums
City	Stadium	Capacity	Image
Bologna	Stadio Littoriale	50,100	
Florence	Stadio Giovanni Berta	47,290	
Genoa	Stadio Luigi Ferraris	36,703	
Milan	Stadio San Siro	55,000	
Naples	Stadio Giorgio Ascarelli	40,000	
Rome	Stadio Nazionale PNF	47,300	
Trieste	Stadio Littorio	8,000	
Turin	Stadio Benito Mussolini	28,140	

== Format ==
The group stage used in the first World Cup was replaced with a straight knockout tournament. If a match was tied after ninety minutes, then thirty minutes of extra time were played. If the score was still tied after extra time, the match was replayed the next day.

The eight seeded teams – Argentina, Brazil, Germany, Italy, the Netherlands, Austria, Czechoslovakia and Hungary – were kept apart in the first round.

== Summary ==
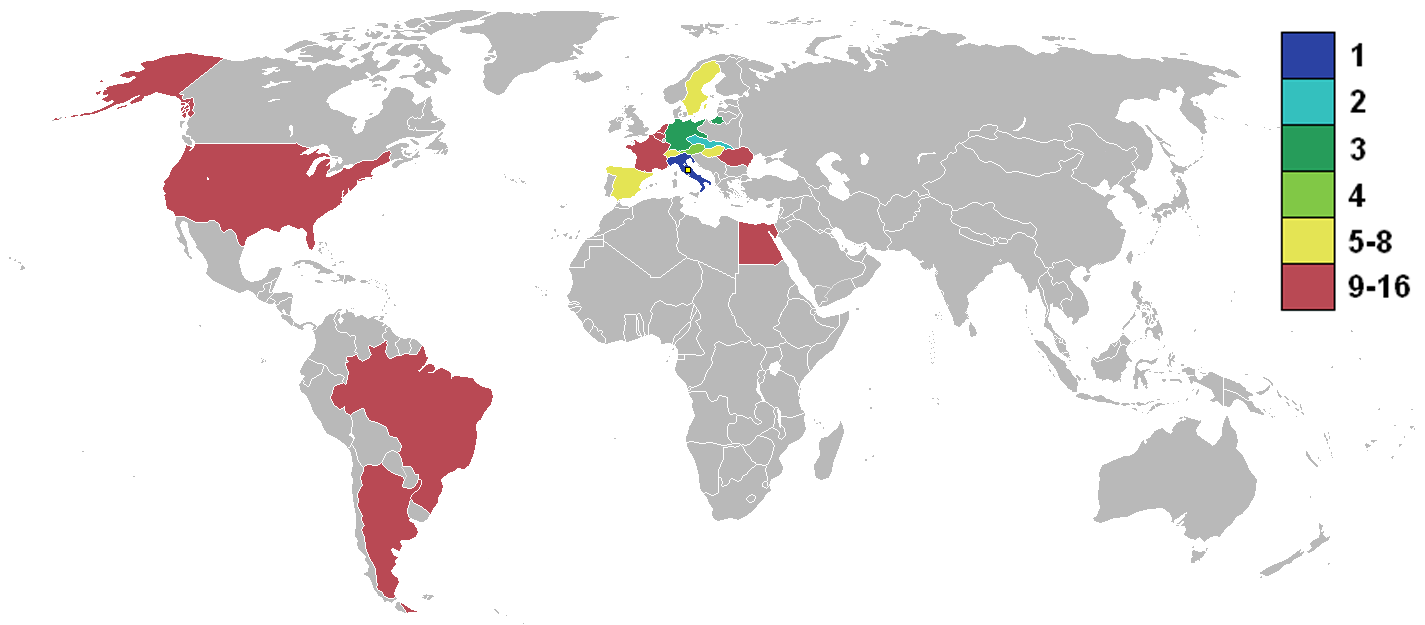
Qualifying countries and their results

All eight first-round matches kicked off at the same time. Hosts and favourites Italy won handsomely, defeating the USA 7–1; The New York Times correspondent wrote that "only the fine goalkeeping of Julius Hjulian of Chicago kept the score as low as it was".

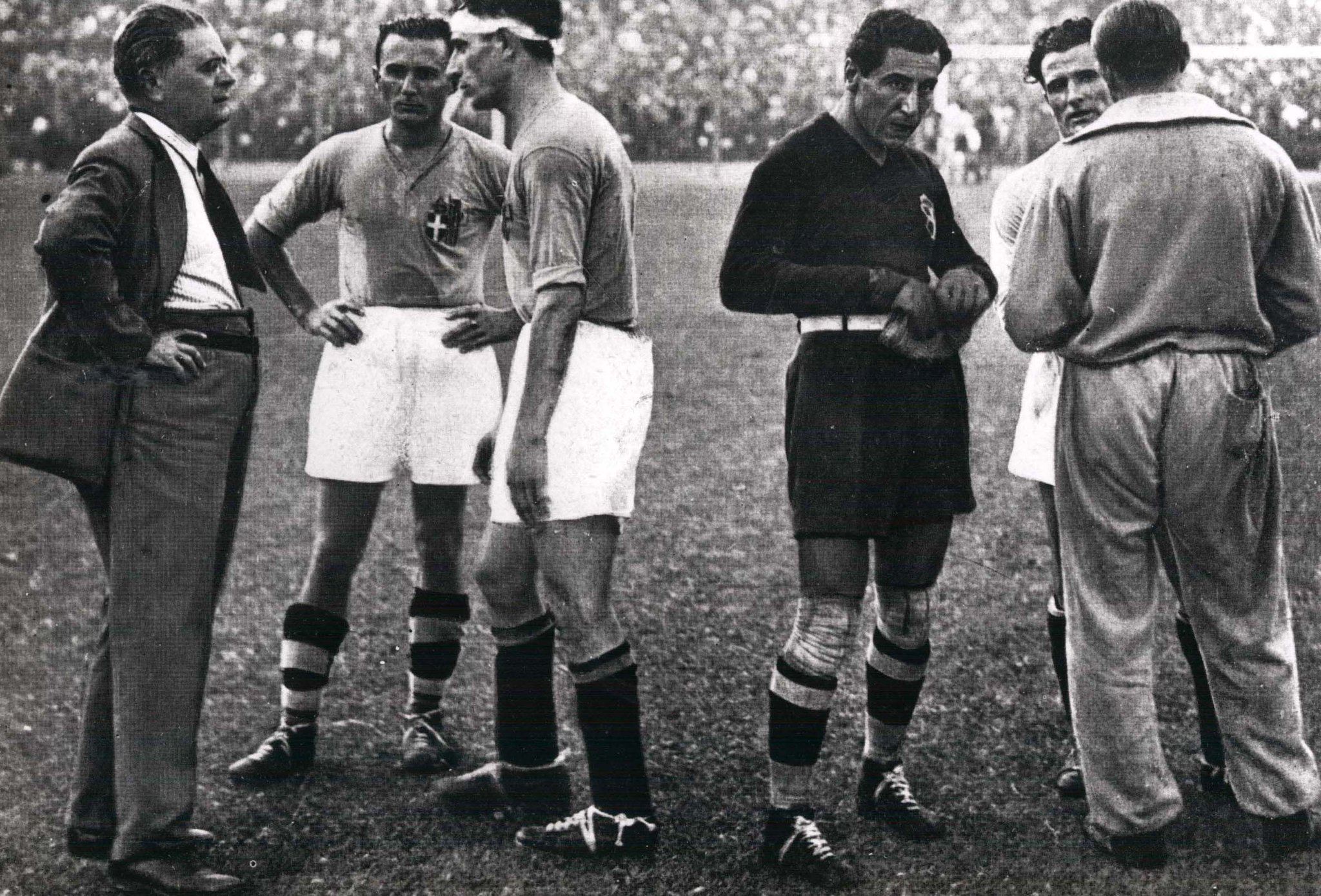
From left to right: Italian manager Pozzo, Monzeglio, Bertolini, the goalkeeper and captain Combi, Monti (half-hidden) and the assistant manager Carcano (behind) before the start of extra time in the victorious final versus Czechoslovakia

Internal disputes meant Argentina's tournament squad included no members of the team that reached the final in 1930. In the end, La Albiceleste would partake with an amateur squad. Against Sweden in Bologna, Argentina took the lead twice, but two goals by Sven Jonasson and a winner by Knut Kroon gave Sweden a 3–2 victory. Fellow South Americans Brazil also suffered an early exit. Spain beat them comfortably, with 3–1 as the final score.

For the first and only time in World Cup history, the last eight consisted entirely of European teams – Austria, Czechoslovakia, Germany, Hungary, Italy, Spain, Sweden, and Switzerland. All four non-European teams that made the journey to Italy were eliminated after one match.

In the quarter-finals, the first replayed match in World Cup history took place, when Italy and Spain drew 1–1 after extra time. The match was played in a highly aggressive manner, with several players of both sides injured: rough play injured the Spanish goalkeeper Ricardo Zamora in the first match, leaving him unable to participate in the replay, while on the other side rough play by Spaniards broke the leg of the Italian Mario Pizziolo, who would not play in the national team again. Italy won the replay 1–0; their play was so physical that at least three Spaniards had to depart the field with injuries. Italy then beat Austria in the semi-finals by the same score. Meanwhile, Czechoslovakia secured their place in the final by beating Germany 3–1.

The Stadium of the National Fascist Party hosted the final. With 80 minutes played, the Czechoslovaks led 1–0. The Italians scored before the final whistle and added another goal in extra time to be crowned World Cup winners.

Allegations have been made by various media that the tournament was marred by bribery and corruption, specifically that it could have been influenced by Italian dictator Benito Mussolini, who used it as a propaganda tool for fascism. According to these accusations, Mussolini personally selected referees for the matches where the Italian national team were playing, while the Italian government meddled in FIFA's organisation of events, reorganising the logistics of the matches to further promote fascism. Later commentary has described Italy's successful defence of the following World Cup in France in 1938 as an opportunity to counter the allegations surrounding the 1934 tournament.

== Squads ==
For a list of all squads that appeared in the final tournament, see 1934 FIFA World Cup squads.

== Final tournament ==
=== Bracket ===
Round of 16
27 May – Rome
Italy	7
United States	1
27 May – Genoa
Spain	3
Brazil	1
27 May – Turin
Austria (a.e.t.)	3
France	2
27 May – Naples
Hungary	4
Egypt	2
27 May – Trieste
Czechoslovakia	2
Romania	1
27 May – Milan
Switzerland	3
Netherlands	2
27 May – Florence
Germany	5
Belgium	2
27 May – Bologna
Sweden	3
Argentina	2

Quarter-finals
31 May / 1 June – Florence
Italy (replay)	1 / 1
Spain	1 / 0
31 May – Bologna
Austria	2
Hungary	1
31 May – Turin
Czechoslovakia	3
Switzerland	2
31 May – Milan
Germany	2
Sweden	1

Semi-finals
3 June – Milan
Italy	1
Austria	0
3 June – Rome
Czechoslovakia	3
Germany	1

Final
10 June – Rome
Italy (a.e.t.)	2
Czechoslovakia	1
Match for third place
7 June – Naples
Germany	3
Austria	2

=== Round of 16 ===
27 May 1934
16:00 CET (UTC+01:00)

Spain	3–1	Brazil
Iraragorri 18' (pen.), 25'; Lángara 29'		Leônidas 55'

Stadio Luigi Ferraris, Genoa
Attendance: 21,000
Referee: Alfred Birlem (Germany)

27 May 1934
16:00 CET (UTC+01:00)

Hungary	4–2	Egypt
Teleki 11'; Toldi 31', 61'; Vincze 53'		Fawzi 35', 39'

Stadio Giorgio Ascarelli, Naples
Attendance: 9,000
Referee: Rinaldo Barlassina (Italy)

27 May 1934
16:00 CET (UTC+01:00)

Switzerland	3–2	Netherlands
Kielholz 7', 43'; Abegglen 66'		Smit 29'; Vente 69'

Stadio San Siro, Milan
Attendance: 33,000
Referee: Ivan Eklind (Sweden)

27 May 1934
16:00 CET (UTC+01:00)

Italy	7–1	United States
Schiavio 18', 29', 64'; Orsi 20', 69'; Ferrari 63'; Meazza 90'		Donelli 57'

Stadio Nazionale PNF, Rome
Attendance: 25,000
Referee: René Mercet (Switzerland)

27 May 1934
16:00 CET (UTC+01:00)

Czechoslovakia	2–1	Romania
Puč 50'; Nejedlý 67'		Dobay 11'

Stadio Littorio, Trieste
Attendance: 9,000
Referee: John Langenus (Belgium)

27 May 1934
16:00 CET (UTC+01:00)

Sweden	3–2	Argentina
Jonasson 9', 67'; Kroon 79'		Belis 4'; Galateo 48'

Stadio Littoriale, Bologna
Attendance: 14,000
Referee: Eugen Braun (Austria)

27 May 1934
16:00 CET (UTC+01:00)

Austria	3–2 (a.e.t.)	France
Sindelar 44'; Schall 93'; Bican 109'		Nicolas 18'; Verriest 116' (pen.)

Stadio Benito Mussolini, Turin
Attendance: 16,000
Referee: Johannes van Moorsel (Netherlands)

27 May 1934
16:00 CET (UTC+01:00)

Germany	5–2	Belgium
Kobierski 25'; Siffling 49'; Conen 66', 70', 87'		Voorhoof 29', 43'

Stadio Giovanni Berta, Florence
Attendance: 8,000
Referee: Francesco Mattea (Italy)

=== Quarter-finals ===
31 May 1934
16:30 CET (UTC+01:00)

Austria	2–1	Hungary
Horvath 8'; Zischek 51'		Sárosi 60' (pen.)

Stadio Littoriale, Bologna
Attendance: 23,000
Referee: Francesco Mattea (Italy)

31 May 1934
16:30 CET (UTC+01:00)

Italy	1–1 (a.e.t.)	Spain
Ferrari 44'		Regueiro 30'

Stadio Giovanni Berta, Florence
Attendance: 35,000
Referee: Louis Baert (Belgium)

31 May 1934
16:30 CET (UTC+01:00)

Germany	2–1	Sweden
Hohmann 60', 63'		Dunker 82'

Stadio San Siro, Milan
Attendance: 3,000
Referee: Rinaldo Barlassina (Italy)

31 May 1934
16:30 CET (UTC+01:00)

Czechoslovakia	3–2	Switzerland
Svoboda 24'; Sobotka 49'; Nejedlý 82'		Kielholz 18'; Jäggi 78'

Stadio Benito Mussolini, Turin
Attendance: 12,000
Referee: Alois Beranek (Austria)

==== Replay ====
1 June 1934
16:30 CET (UTC+01:00)

Italy	1–0	Spain
Meazza 11'

Stadio Giovanni Berta, Florence
Attendance: 43,000
Referee: René Mercet (Switzerland)

=== Semi-finals ===
3 June 1934
16:30 CET (UTC+01:00)

Italy	1–0	Austria
Guaita 19'

Stadio San Siro, Milan
Attendance: 35,000
Referee: Ivan Eklind (Sweden)

3 June 1934
16:30 CET (UTC+01:00)

Czechoslovakia	3–1	Germany
Nejedlý 21', 69', 80'		Noack 62'

Stadio Nazionale PNF, Rome
Attendance: 15,000
Referee: Rinaldo Barlassina (Italy)

=== Match for third place ===
7 June 1934
18:00 CET (UTC+01:00)

Germany	3–2	Austria
Lehner 1', 42'; Conen 27'		Horvath 28'; Sesta 54'

Stadio Giorgio Ascarelli, Naples
Attendance: 7,000
Referee: Albino Carraro (Italy)

=== Final ===
10 June 1934
15:30 CET (UTC+01:00)

Italy	2–1 (a.e.t.)	Czechoslovakia
Orsi 81'; Schiavio 95'		Puč 71'

Stadio Nazionale PNF, Rome
Attendance: 55,000
Referee: Ivan Eklind (Sweden)

== Statistics ==
=== Goalscorers ===
With five goals, Oldřich Nejedlý was the tournament's top scorer. In total, 70 goals were scored by 45 players, and none were credited as own goals.

5 goals

- (Czechoslovakia) Oldřich Nejedlý

4 goals

- (Germany) Edmund Conen
- (Italy) Angelo Schiavio

3 goals

- (Italy) Raimundo Orsi
- (Switzerland) Leopold Kielholz

2 goals

- (Austria) Johann Horvath
- (Belgium) Bernard Voorhoof
- (Czechoslovakia) Antonín Puč
- (Egypt) Abdulrahman Fawzi
- (Germany) Karl Hohmann
- (Germany) Ernst Lehner
- (Hungary) Géza Toldi
- (Italy) Giovanni Ferrari
- (Italy) Giuseppe Meazza
- (Spain) José Iraragorri
- (Sweden) Sven Jonasson

1 goal

- (Argentina) Ernesto Belis
- (Argentina) Alberto Galateo
- (Austria) Josef Bican
- (Austria) Anton Schall
- (Austria) Karl Sesta
- (Austria) Matthias Sindelar
- (Austria) Karl Zischek
- (Brazil) Leônidas
- (Czechoslovakia) Jiří Sobotka
- (Czechoslovakia) František Svoboda
- (France) Jean Nicolas
- (France) Georges Verriest
- (Germany) Stanislaus Kobierski
- (Germany) Rudolf Noack
- (Germany) Otto Siffling
- (Hungary) György Sárosi
- (Hungary) Pál Teleki
- (Hungary) Jenő Vincze
- (Italy) Enrique Guaita
- (Netherlands) Kick Smit
- (Netherlands) Leen Vente
- (Romania) Ștefan Dobay
- (Spain) Isidro Lángara
- (Spain) Luis Regueiro
- (Sweden) Gösta Dunker
- (Sweden) Knut Kroon
- (Switzerland) André Abegglen
- (Switzerland) Willy Jäggi
- (United States) Aldo Donelli

=== Team of the Tournament ===
FIFA selected the following players for the 1934 FIFA World Cup All-Star Team.

Goalkeeper	Defenders	Midfielders	Forwards
(Spain) Ricardo Zamora	(Italy) Eraldo Monzeglio (Spain) Jacinto Quincoces	(Spain) Leonardo Cilaurren (Italy) Attilio Ferraris (Italy) Luis Monti	(Italy) Enrique Guaita (Italy) Giuseppe Meazza (Czech Republic) Oldřich Nejedlý (Italy) Raimundo Orsi (Austria) Matthias Sindelar

=== Tournament ranking ===
In 1986, FIFA published a report that ranked all teams in each World Cup up to and including 1986, based on progress in the competition and overall results (not counting replay results). The rankings for the 1934 tournament were as follows:

Per statistical convention in football, matches decided in extra time are counted as wins and losses. Per FIFA's ranking, replay results are not considered in the tournament ranking.

Pos	Team	Pld	W	D	L	GF	GA	GD	Pts	Final result
1	Italy (H)	4	3	1	0	11	3	+8	7 (Note: Italy's record including the replay: 5 pld, 4 won, 1 drawn, 0 lost, 12 GF, 3 GA, +9 GD, 9 pts.)	Champions
2	Czechoslovakia	4	3	0	1	9	6	+3	6	Runners-up
3	Germany	4	3	0	1	11	8	+3	6	Third place
4	Austria	4	2	0	2	7	7	0	4	Fourth place
5	Spain	2	1	1	0	4	2	+2	3 (Note: Spain's record including the replay: 3 pld, 1 won, 1 drawn, 1 lost, 4 GF, 3 GA, +1 GD, 3 pts.)	Eliminated in quarter-finals
6	Hungary	2	1	0	1	5	4	+1	2	Eliminated in quarter-finals
7	Switzerland	2	1	0	1	5	5	0	2	Eliminated in quarter-finals
8	Sweden	2	1	0	1	4	4	0	2	Eliminated in quarter-finals
=9	Argentina	1	0	0	1	2	3	−1	0	Eliminated in round of 16
=9	France	1	0	0	1	2	3	−1	0	Eliminated in round of 16
=9	Netherlands	1	0	0	1	2	3	−1	0	Eliminated in round of 16
12	Romania	1	0	0	1	1	2	−1	0	Eliminated in round of 16
13	Egypt	1	0	0	1	2	4	−2	0	Eliminated in round of 16
14	Brazil	1	0	0	1	1	3	−2	0	Eliminated in round of 16
15	Belgium	1	0	0	1	2	5	−3	0	Eliminated in round of 16
16	United States	1	0	0	1	1	7	−6	0	Eliminated in round of 16

Source: FIFA
(H) Hosts

== Bibliography ==
- Baker, William Joseph (1988), Sports in the Western World, Urbana, IL: University of Illinois Press, ISBN 978-0-252-06042-7
- Crouch, Terry (2002), The World Cup: The Complete History, London: Aurum, ISBN 978-1-85410-843-2
- de Carvalho, José Eduardo (2014), History of World Cups, O Estado de S.Paulo, ISBN 9788584280032
- Freddi, Cris (2006), Complete Book of the World Cup 2006, London: HarperCollins, ISBN 0-00-722916-X
- Glanville, Brian (2005), The Story of the World Cup, London: Faber and Faber, ISBN 978-0-571-22944-4
- Goldblatt, David (2007), The Ball is Round: A Global History of Football, London: Penguin, ISBN 978-0-14-101582-8
- Hunt, Chris (2006), World Cup Stories: The History of the FIFA World Cup, Ware: Interact, ISBN 978-0-9549819-2-1
- Murray, Bill (1998), The World's Game: A History of Soccer, Urbana, IL: University of Illinois Press, ISBN 978-0-252-06718-1
- Wangerin, Dave (2006), Soccer in a Football World, London: WSC Books, ISBN 978-0-9540134-7-9
- Wilson, Jonathan (2009), Inverting the Pyramid: The History of Football Tactics, London: Orion, ISBN 978-1-4091-0204-5
