= Josef Zeman (footballer) =

Czech footballer

Personal information
- Date of birth: 23 January 1915
- Place of birth: Drunče, Austria-Hungary
- Date of death: 3 May 1999 (aged 84)
- Place of death: Czech Republic
- Position: Striker

Youth career
- SK České Budějovice

Senior career*
Years	Team	Apps	(Gls)
1932–1936	SK České Budějovice		
1936	SK Plzeň		
1937–1943	AC Sparta Prague		
1943–1944	SK Pardubice		
1944	SK Nusle		
1945–1946	Čechie Karlín		
1946–1948	SK České Budějovice		

International career
1937–1938	Czechoslovakia	4	(2)

Managerial career
- 1949: SK České Budějovice
- * Club domestic league appearances and goals

Josef Zeman (23 January 1915 – 3 May 1999) was a Czech footballer.

He played for several clubs, including SK České Budějovice and Sparta Prague and the Czechoslovakia national football team (4 matches/2 goals), for whom he appeared in the 1938 FIFA World Cup, scoring one goal.
