= Alois Beranek =

Austrian footballer and referee (1900–1983)

Personal information
- Date of birth: 15 January 1900
- Place of birth: Vienna, Austria
- Date of death: 22 May 1983 (aged 83)

Senior career*
Years	Team	Apps	(Gls)
- Wacker Wien
- ASV Hertha Wien

Managerial career
- Rapid Wien
Refereeing career
- Other occupation: Inspector in the main telegraph office
Domestic
Years	League	Role
1930–1952	ÖFB	Referee
1938–1952	DFB	Referee
International
Years	League	Role
1933–1952	FIFA	Referee
- * Club domestic league appearances and goals

Alois Beranek (15 January 1900 – 22 May 1983) was an Austrian football player, manager and referee. He was a referee in the 1934 and 1938 FIFA World Cup tournaments and a linesman at the 1950 FIFA World Cup.

== Playing career ==
Beranek played for Wacker and ASV Hertha Wien.

== Coaching career ==
He managed Rapid Wien to an Austrian league championship in 1956.

== Refereeing career ==
Beranek refereed from the 1930s to the mid-1950s. He refereed matches at the 1934 and 1938 FIFA World Cup finals tournaments.
