= 1933–1935 Central European International Cup =

1933–35 Central European International Cup
Tournament details
- Dates: 2 April 1933 – 24 November 1935
- Teams: 5

Final positions
- Champions: Italy (2nd title)
- Runners-up: Austria
- Third place: Hungary
- Fourth place: Czechoslovakia

Tournament statistics
- Matches played: 20
- Goals scored: 76 (3.8 per match)
- Attendance: 621,300 (31,065 per match)
- Top goal scorer(s): (Switzerland) Leopold Kielholz (Hungary) György Sárosi (7 goals)

The 1933–35 Central European International Cup was the third edition of the Central European International Cup played between 1933 and 1935. It was played in a round robin tournament between five teams involved in the tournament.

== Final standings ==
Pos	Team	Pld	W	D	L	GF	GA	GD	Pts
1	Italy	8	5	1	2	18	10	+8	11
2	Austria	8	3	3	2	17	15	+2	9
3	Hungary	8	3	3	2	17	16	+1	9
4	Czechoslovakia	8	2	4	2	11	11	0	8
5	Switzerland	8	1	1	6	13	24	−11	3

Source: EU-Football

== Matches ==
2 April 1933
15:00 (UTC+01:00)

Switzerland	0–3	Italy
	Report	Schiavio 35', 60'; Meazza 75'

Stade des Charmilles, Geneva, Switzerland
Attendance: 25,300
Referee: Louis Baert (Belgium)

7 May 1933
15:30 (UTC+01:00)

Italy	2–0	Czechoslovakia
Ferrari 41'; Schiavio 44'	Report

Stadio Comunale Giovanni Berta, Florence, Kingdom of Italy
Attendance: 25,000
Referee: Louis Baert (Belgium)

17 September 1933
15:30 (UTC+01:00)

Hungary	3–0	Switzerland
Avar 7', 77'; Minelli 66' (o.g.)	Report

Hungária körúti stadion, Budapest, Kingdom of Hungary
Attendance: 17,000
Referee: Hans Frankenstein (Austria)

22 October 1933
15:00 (UTC+01:00)

Hungary	0–1	Italy
	Report	Borel 43'

Üllői úti stadion, Budapest, Kingdom of Hungary
Attendance: 38,000
Referee: Stanley Rous (England)

3 December 1933
14:30 (UTC+01:00)

Italy	5–2	Switzerland
Ferrari 8'; Pizziolo 44'; Orsi 49'; Meazza 55'; Monti 66'	Report	Bossi 21'; Kielholz 38'

Stadio Comunale Giovanni Berta, Florence, Kingdom of Italy
Attendance: 35,000
Referee: Louis Baert (Belgium)

11 February 1934
14:30 (UTC+01:00)

Italy	2–4	Austria
Guaita 48' (pen.), 50'	Report	Zischek 19', 23', 55'; Binder 28'

Stadio Municipale Benito Mussolini, Turin, Kingdom of Italy
Attendance: 54,000
Referee: René Mercet (Switzerland)

25 March 1934
15:00 (UTC+01:00)

Switzerland	2–3	Austria
Bossi 58'; Kielholz 68'	Report	Bican 16', 76'; Kaburek 46'

Stade des Charmilles, Geneva, Switzerland
Attendance: 25,000
Referee: Stanley Rous (England)

29 April 1934
17:00 (UTC+01:00)

Czechoslovakia	2–2	Hungary
Sobotka 2'; Puč 42'	Report	Sárosi 30', 56'

Letenský Stadion, Prague, Czechoslovakia
Attendance: 30,000
Referee: Francesco Mattea (Italy)

23 September 1934
16:00 (UTC+01:00)

Austria	2–2	Czechoslovakia
Binder 4'; Vogl 31'	Report	Čech 59', 86'

Praterstadion, Vienna, Austria
Attendance: 50,000
Referee: Rinaldo Barlassina (Italy)

7 October 1934
15:00 (UTC+01:00)

Hungary	3–1	Austria
Sárosi 34', 47'; Toldi 84'	Report	Zischek 17'

Hungária körúti stadion, Budapest, Kingdom of Hungary
Attendance: 33,000
Referee: Rinaldo Barlassina (Italy)

14 October 1934
15:00 (UTC+01:00)

Switzerland	2–2	Czechoslovakia
Kielholz 14', 41'	Report	Nejedlý 45', 58'

Stade des Charmilles, Geneva, Switzerland
Attendance: 15,000
Referee: Walter Lewington (England)

11 November 1934
14:15 (UTC+01:00)

Austria	3–0	Switzerland
Kaburek 3'; Skoumal 6'; Zischek 46'	Report

Praterstadion, Vienna, Austria
Attendance: 33,000
Referee: Gustav Krist (Czechoslovakia)

17 February 1935
14:30 (UTC+01:00)

Czechoslovakia	3–1	Switzerland
Horák 8'; Nejedlý 37', 89'	Report	Bösch 48'

Letenský Stadion, Prague, Czechoslovakia
Attendance: 25,000
Referee: Peco Bauwens (Germany)

24 March 1935
16:00 (UTC+01:00)

Austria	0–2	Italy
	Report	Piola 51', 81'

Praterstadion, Vienna, Austria
Attendance: 60,000
Referee: Walter Lewington (England)

14 April 1935
16:00 (UTC+01:00)

Czechoslovakia	0–0	Austria
	Report

Letenský Stadion, Prague, Czechoslovakia
Attendance: 30,000
Referee: Rinaldo Barlassina (Italy)

14 April 1935
15:00 (UTC+01:00)

Switzerland	6–2	Hungary
Jäck 8'; Kielholz 21', 35', 57'; Abegglen 40', 63'	Report	Cseh 59', 72' (pen.)

Hardturm, Zürich, Switzerland
Attendance: 30,000
Referee: Walter Lewington (England)

22 September 1935
16:00 (UTC+01:00)

Hungary	1–0	Czechoslovakia
Markos 60'	Report

Hungária körúti stadion, Budapest, Hungary
Attendance: 22,000
Referee: John Langenus (Belgium)

6 October 1935
13:30 (UTC+01:00)

Austria	4–4	Hungary
Bican 7', 11', 58'; Hofmann 66'	Report	Toldi 6'; Vincze 8', 30'; Sárosi 21'

Praterstadion, Vienna, Austria
Attendance: 40,000
Referee: Karl Wunderlin (Switzerland)

27 October 1935
15:30 (UTC+01:00)

Czechoslovakia	2–1	Italy
Horák 52', 80'	Report	Pitto 75'

Sportovní Stadion, Prague, Czechoslovakia
Attendance: 8,000
Referee: Pedro Escartín (Spain)

24 November 1935
14:30 (UTC+01:00)

Italy	2–2	Hungary
Colaussi 69'; Ferrari 70'	Report	Sárosi 43', 79'

Arena Civica, Milan, Kingdom of Italy
Attendance: 26,000
Referee: Hans Wüthrich (Switzerland)

== Winner ==
1933–35 Central European International Cup

Italy
Second title

== Statistics ==
=== Goalscorers ===
There were 76 goals scored in 20 matches, for an average of 3.8 goals per match.

7 goals

- (Hungary) György Sárosi
- (Czechoslovakia) Leopold Kielholz

5 goals

- (Austria) Josef Bican
- (Austria) Karl Zischek

4 goals

- (Czechoslovakia) Oldřich Nejedlý

3 goals

- (Italy) Angelo Schiavio
- (Italy) Giovanni Ferrari
- (Czechoslovakia) Václav Horák

2 goals

- (Austria) Franz Binder
- (Austria) Mathias Kaburek
- (Italy) Enrique Guaita
- (Italy) Giuseppe Meazza
- (Italy) Silvio Piola
- (Hungary) Jenő Vincze
- (Hungary) Géza Toldi
- (Hungary) László Cseh
- (Hungary) István Avar
- (Switzerland) André Abegglen
- (Switzerland) Joseph Bossi
- (Czechoslovakia) Vratislav Čech

1 goal

- (Austria) Stefan Skoumal
- (Austria) Adolf Vogl
- (Austria) Leopold Hofmann
- (Hungary) Imre Markos
- (Italy) Mario Pizziolo
- (Italy) Raimundo Orsi
- (Italy) Luis Monti
- (Italy) Alfredo Pitto
- (Italy) Gino Colaussi
- (Italy) Felice Borel
- (Switzerland) Alfred Jäck
- (Switzerland) Engelbert Bösch
- (Czechoslovakia) Antonín Puč
- (Czechoslovakia) Jiří Sobotka

1 own goal

- (Switzerland) Severino Minelli (against Hungary)
