= Stadio Partenopeo =

Former stadium in Naples, Italy

Coordinates: 40°51′35″N 14°17′36″E

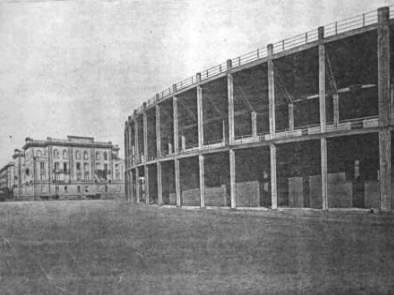
- A view from street level.
- Interactive map of Stadio Partenopeo
- Location: Naples, Campania, Italy
- Capacity: pre-renovation: 20,000 post-renovation: 40,000
- Surface: Grass

Construction
- Groundbreaking: 1929
- Built: 1929–1930
- Opened: 16 February 1930
- Renovated: 1934
- Closed: 1942 (destroyed)

Tenant
- SSC Napoli

Stadio Partenopeo, also known as Stadio Giorgio Ascarelli, was a multi-purpose stadium in Naples, Italy. Completed in 1929, the original structure was able to accommodate around 20,000 before being rebuilt five years later with an upgraded seated capacity of 40,000. It was the home of SSC Napoli.

The stadium was destroyed in 1942 during the bombing of Naples in World War II.

== History ==
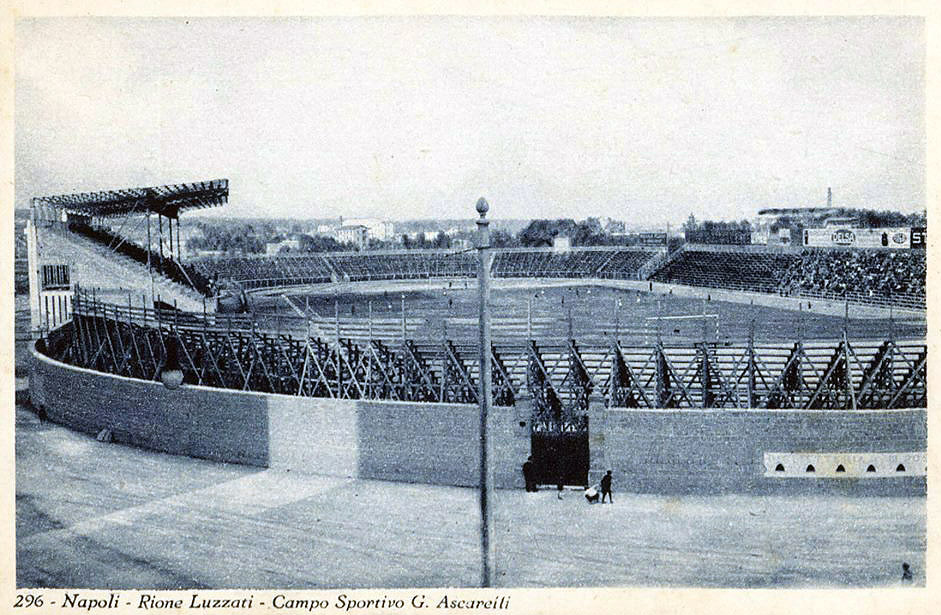
The stadium under construction in 1930.

The stadium was built to serve as a new home for SSC Napoli (Napoli), which had been founded just a few years prior in 1926. Then-president of Napoli Giorgio Ascarelli wanted the club to have a modern stadium, comparable to those of the larger teams in Northern Italy. The stadium was originally constructed with wooden stands, with a capacity of about 20,000. When it opened on 16 February 1930, it was named Stadio Vesuvio, for the street on which it stood. Sadly, Ascarelli died from peritonitis just 25 days later, at the age of 36. Due to his overwhelming philanthropic support in the city and for the club — including financing the entire stadium's construction — the stadium was renamed Stadio Giorgio Ascarelli in his honor.

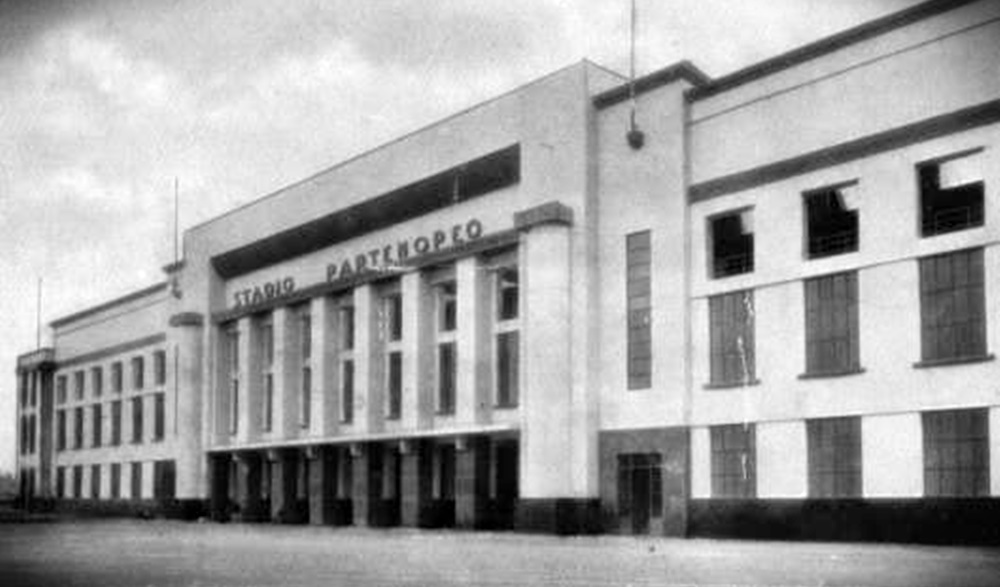
The stadium after its renovation.

His name unfortunately did not remain on the building for very long, as the stadium was soon greatly expanded for the 1934 FIFA World Cup by the National Fascist Party, which included the removal of Ascarelli's name due to his Jewish heritage, and the renaming of the stadium to Stadio Partenopeo. With its seating capacity roughly doubled as the wooden structure was replaced with concrete, the newly renovated structure could now hold approximately 40,000 people.

== Events ==
=== 1934 FIFA World Cup ===
The stadium hosted two matches during the 1934 FIFA World Cup, where it was one of Italy's premier venues for showcasing the country's infrastructure to an international audience. Hungary defeated Egypt in a 4–2 Round of 16 match on 27 May, and Germany beat Austria 3–2 on 7 June in a third place play-off match.
