= Georges Capdeville =

French football referee (1899–1991)

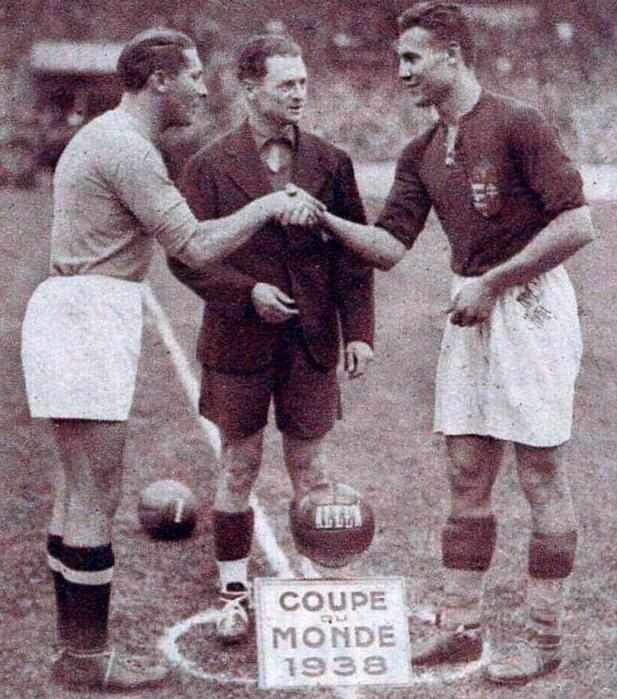

Pierre Georges Louis Capdeville (30 October 1899 – 24 February 1991) was a football referee from France, who controlled the 1938 FIFA World Cup Final in Colombes, France between defending champions Italy and Hungary, with the former team winning 4–2. He is the only referee to have officiated in a World Cup final in his native country.

Capdeville was the referee in the French Cup final in 1936 in the game between Racing Club of Paris and Charleville (1–0), and was also in charge of the Yugoslavia versus England match during the Football Association's last European tour before the outbreak of the Second World War.

== Major matches refereed ==
| Date | Match | Tournament | Venue | Result | Ref |
|---|---|---|---|---|---|
| 19 June 1938 | Italy vs. Hungary | 1938 FIFA World Cup final | Stade Olympique de Colombes, Colombes | 4–2 | |

| Preceded by (Sweden) Ivan Eklind | FIFA World Cup final match referees 1938 (France) Georges Capdeville | Succeeded by (England) George Reader |
