= 1938 FIFA World Cup =

Association football tournament in France

Coupe du Monde France 1938 (French)
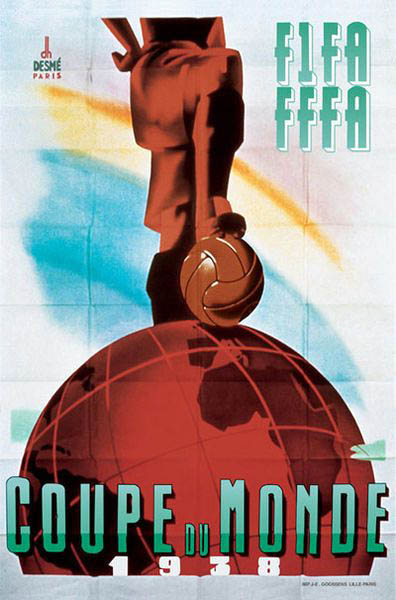
- Official poster

Tournament details
- Host country: France
- Dates: 4–19 June
- Teams: 15 (from 4 confederations)
- Venues: 10 (in 9 host cities)

Final positions
- Champions: Italy (2nd title)
- Runners-up: Hungary
- Third place: Brazil
- Fourth place: Sweden

Tournament statistics
- Matches played: 18
- Goals scored: 84 (4.67 per match)
- Attendance: 375,700 (20,872 per match)
- Top scorer: (Brazil) Leônidas (7 goals)

The 1938 FIFA World Cup was the 3rd edition of the World Cup, the quadrennial international football championship for senior men's national teams. It was held in France from 4 to 19 June 1938. Italy defended its title in the final, beating Hungary 4–2. Italy's 1934 and 1938 teams hold the distinction of being the only men's national team to win the World Cup multiple times under the same coach, Vittorio Pozzo. It was the last World Cup for 12 years, as the 1942 and 1946 World Cups were cancelled due to World War II.

== Host selection ==
France was chosen as host nation by FIFA in Berlin on 13 August 1936. France was chosen over Argentina and Germany in the first round of voting. The decision to hold a second consecutive tournament in Europe (after Italy in 1934) caused outrage in South America, where it was believed that the venue should alternate between the two continents.

== Qualification ==
Because of the decision to hold a second successive World Cup in Europe, many teams from the Americas did not join the competition or withdrew after an initial application. Most of the South American teams, including Uruguay and Argentina, declined to take part in the competition after the controversy of the Peru v Austria match at the football tournament of the 1936 Summer Olympics. The United States and Mexico joined the qualifying rounds but eventually withdrew. Argentina submitted a late application (which was accepted) before a definitive withdrawal due to disagreements between its national federation and the local clubs. Spain meanwhile could not participate because of the ongoing Spanish Civil War.

It was the first time that the hosts, France, and the title holders, Italy, qualified automatically. Title holders were given an automatic entry into the World Cup from 1938 until 2002.

Of the fourteen remaining places, eleven were allocated to Europe, two to the Americas, and one to Asia. As a result, only three non-European nations took part: Brazil, Cuba (making their debut), and Dutch East Indies (now Indonesia, also making their debut), the latter being the first Asian country to participate in a FIFA World Cup. This is the smallest ever number of teams from outside the host continent to compete at a FIFA World Cup.

The Austrian team qualified for the World Cup, but after qualification was complete, Austria lost its independence under the Anschluss. Austria subsequently did not take part in the tournament, with some Austrian players joining the German squad, although not including Austrian star player Matthias Sindelar, who refused to play for the Nazi German team. Austria's place remained empty, and Sweden, which would have been Austria's initial opponent, progressed directly to the second round by default.

Other teams to make their World Cup debuts included Poland and Norway.

=== List of qualified teams ===
The following 16 teams originally qualified for the final tournament. However, 15 teams participated after Austria's withdrawal due to the Anschluss.

Asia (1)

- Dutch East Indies (debut)

Africa (0)

- None qualified

North, Central America and Caribbean (1)

- Cuba (debut)

South America (1)

- Brazil

Europe (13)

- ~~Austria~~ (withdrew)
- Belgium
- Czechoslovakia
- France (hosts)
- Germany
- Hungary
- Italy (holders)
- Netherlands
- Norway (debut)
- Poland (debut)
- Romania
- Sweden
- Switzerland

As of 2026, this was the only time Cuba and Indonesia (formerly Dutch East Indies) qualified for a FIFA World Cup.

== Format ==
The knockout format from 1934 was retained. If a match was tied after 90 minutes, then 30 minutes of extra time were played. If the score was still tied after extra time, the match would be replayed. This was the last World Cup tournament that used a straight knockout format.

== Final draw ==
The draw was staged in Paris on 5 March 1938. As the qualifying process was still ongoing, many paper slips reported the names of two teams, which were both in competition to qualify.

The FIFA committee identified eight seeded teams, irrespective of their current qualification. The seeded teams were Argentina, Austria, Brazil, Czechoslovakia, France, Germany, Hungary, and Italy, a total of six European and two South American teams.

The whole table was drawn the same day, in the following order:

Round of 16

- A. Germany v Switzerland or Portugal
- B. Austria v Sweden
- C. Hungary or Greece v United States or Dutch East Indies
- D. France v Belgium or Luxembourg
- E. Argentina or Central America v Romania
- F. Czechoslovakia or Bulgaria v Netherlands or Luxembourg
- G. Brazil v Poland or Yugoslavia
- H. Italy v Norway

Quarter-finals

1. Winner B v Winner E
2. Winner A v Winner C
3. Winner D v Winner H
4. Winner F v Winner G

Semi-finals

- Winner 4 v Winner 3
- Winner 2 v Winner 1

On 15 March 1938, Austria was annexed by Nazi Germany, and the Austria national team withdrew.

Argentina withdrew from the tournament after disagreements between the clubs and the national federations, so two of the original seeded teams did not take part in the final competition.

== Summary ==
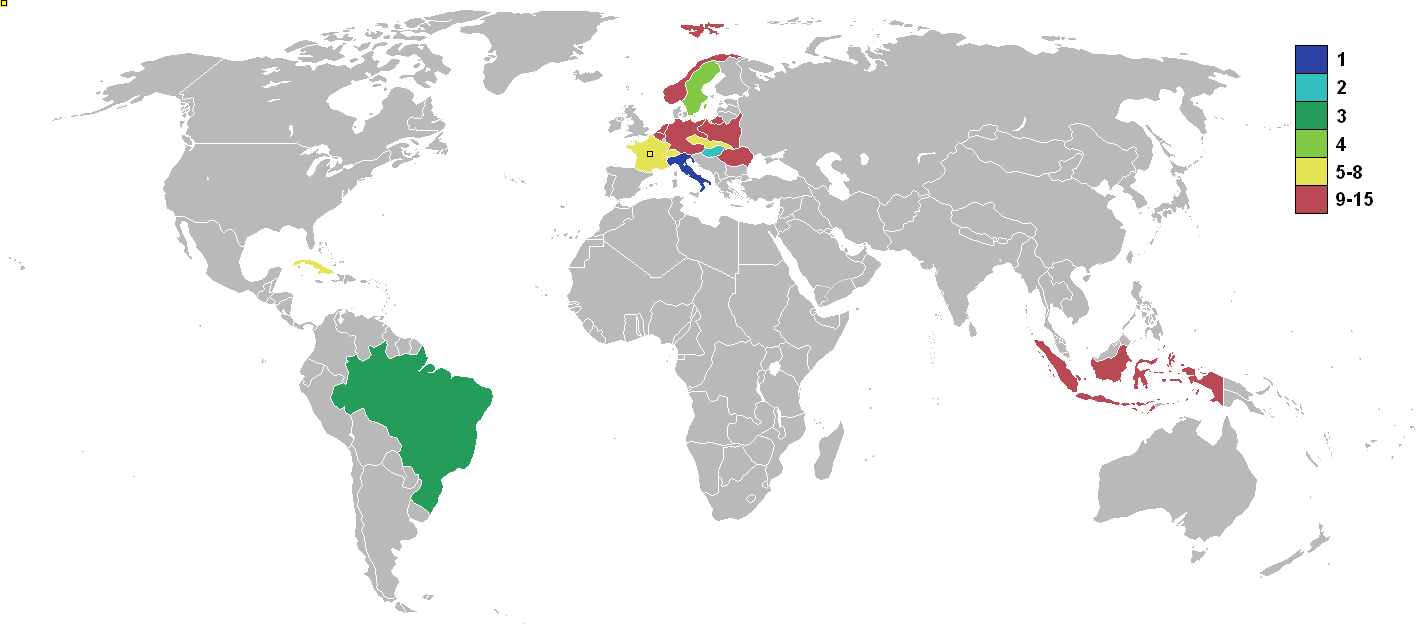
Qualifying countries and their results

Sweden were given a bye when Austria withdrew.

Five of the seven first round matches required extra time to break the deadlock; two games still went to a replay. In one replay, Cuba advanced to the next round at the expense of Romania. In the other replay, Germany, which had led 1–0 in the first game against Switzerland, led 2–0 but eventually was beaten 2–4. This loss, which took place in front of a hostile, bottle-throwing crowd in Paris, was blamed by German coach Sepp Herberger on a defeatist attitude from the five Austrian players he had been forced to include; a German journalist later commented that "Germans and Austrians prefer to play against each other even when they're in the same team". Until they were knocked out in the group stage in 2018, this was the only time Germany had failed to advance past the first round, and until their penalty shoot-out victory over France in the round of 16 of UEFA Euro 2020, this was the last time Switzerland advanced past the first knockout game of a tournament.

Sweden advanced directly to the quarter-finals as a result of Austria's withdrawal, and they proceeded to beat Cuba 8–0. The hosts, France, were beaten by the holders, Italy, and Switzerland were seen off by Hungary. Czechoslovakia took Brazil to extra time in a notoriously feisty match in Bordeaux before succumbing in a replay; the South Americans proved too strong for the depleted Czechoslovak side (both Oldřich Nejedlý and František Plánička had suffered broken bones in the first game) and won 2–1. This was the last match to be replayed in a World Cup.

Hungary convincingly beat Sweden in one of the semi-finals 5–1, while Italy and Brazil had the first of their many important World Cup clashes in the other. The Brazilians were without their star player Leônidas, who was injured, and the Italians won 2–1. Brazil topped Sweden 4–2 for third place.

Rumour has it, before the finals Benito Mussolini was to have sent a telegram to the team, saying "Vincere o morire!" (literally translated as "Win or die!"). This should not have been meant as a literal threat, but instead just an encouragement to win. However, no record remains of such a telegram, and World Cup player Pietro Rava said, when interviewed in 2001, "No, no, no, that's not true. He sent a telegram wishing us well, but no never 'win or die'."

The final itself took place at the Stade Olympique de Colombes in Paris. Vittorio Pozzo's Italian side took the lead early, but Hungary equalised within two minutes. The Italians took the lead again shortly after, and by the end of the first half were leading the Hungarians 3–1. Hungary never really got back into the game. With the final score favouring the Italians 4–2, Italy became the first team to successfully defend the title and were once more crowned World Cup winners.

Because of World War II, the World Cup was not held for next 12 years, until 1950. As a result, Italy were the reigning World Cup holders for a record 16 years, from 1934 to 1950. The Italian Vice-president of FIFA, Dr. Ottorino Barassi, hid the trophy in a shoe-box under his bed throughout the Second World War and thus saved it from falling into the hands of occupying Nazi troops.

== Venues ==
Initially, the tournament was planned to be hosted at 11 venues across France. However, after Austria withdrew, the Stade de Gerland in Lyon was no longer needed, so it was removed from the stadium list.

=== Host cities and stadiums ===
Locations of the 1938 FIFA World Cup host cities

List of host cities and stadiums
City	Stadium	Capacity	Image
Antibes	Stade du Fort Carré	7,000	
Bordeaux	Parc Lescure	34,694	
Colombes	Stade Olympique de Colombes	60,000	
Le Havre	Stade Municipal	22,000	
Lille	Stade Victor Boucquey	15,000	
Marseille	Stade Vélodrome	48,000	
Paris	Parc des Princes	40,000	
Reims	Vélodrome Municipal	21,684	
Strasbourg	Stade de la Meinau	22,000	
Toulouse	Stade du T.O.E.C.	15,000	

== Squads ==
For a list of all squads that appeared in the final tournament, see 1938 FIFA World Cup squads.

== Final tournament ==
=== Bracket ===
Round of 16
5 June – Marseille
Italy (a.e.t.)	2
Norway	1
5 June – Colombes
France	3
Belgium	1
5 June – Strasbourg
Brazil (a.e.t.)	6
Poland	5
5 June – Le Havre
Czechoslovakia (a.e.t.)	3
Netherlands	0
5 June – Reims
Hungary	6
Dutch East Indies	0
4 / 9 June – Paris
Switzerland (rep.)	1 / 4
Germany	1 / 2
5 June – Lyon
Sweden	w/o
Austria
5 / 9 June – Toulouse
Cuba (rep.)	3 / 2
Romania	3 / 1

Quarter-finals
12 June – Colombes
Italy	3
France	1
12 / 14 June – Bordeaux
Brazil (rep.)	1 / 2
Czechoslovakia	1 / 1
12 June – Lille
Hungary	2
Switzerland	0
12 June – Antibes
Sweden	8
Cuba	0

Semi-finals
16 June – Marseille
Italy	2
Brazil	1
16 June – Paris
Hungary	5
Sweden	1

Final
19 June – Colombes
Italy	4
Hungary	2
Match for third place
19 June – Bordeaux
Brazil	4
Sweden	2

=== Round of 16 ===
4 June 1938
17:00 WEST (UTC+01:00)

Switzerland	1–1 (a.e.t.)	Germany
Abegglen 43'		Gauchel 29'

Parc des Princes, Paris
Attendance: 27,152
Referee: John Langenus (Belgium)

5 June 1938
17:00 WEST (UTC+01:00)

Hungary	6–0	Dutch East Indies
Kohut 13'; Toldi 15'; G. Sárosi 25', 89'; Zsengellér 30', 76'

Vélodrome Municipal, Reims
Attendance: 9,000
Referee: Roger Conrié (France)

5 June 1938

Sweden	Cancelled	Austria

Stade Gerland, Lyon

Sweden advanced on walkover.

5 June 1938
17:00 WEST (UTC+01:00)

Cuba	3–3 (a.e.t.)	Romania
Socorro 44', 103'; Magriñá 69'		Bindea 35'; Barátky 88'; Dobay 105'

Stade du T.O.E.C., Toulouse
Attendance: 7,000
Referee: Giuseppe Scarpi (Italy)

5 June 1938
17:00 WEST (UTC+01:00)

France	3–1	Belgium
Veinante 1'; Nicolas 16', 69'		Isemborghs 38'

Stade Olympique de Colombes, Colombes
Attendance: 30,454
Referee: Hans Wüthrich (Switzerland)

5 June 1938
17:00 WEST (UTC+01:00)

Italy	2–1 (a.e.t.)	Norway
Ferraris 2'; Piola 94'		Brustad 83'

Stade Vélodrome, Marseille
Attendance: 19,000
Referee: Alois Beranek (Germany) (Note: Actually from Austria, but representing the German Football Association because of the Anschluss.)

5 June 1938
17:00 WEST (UTC+01:00)

Brazil	6–5 (a.e.t.)	Poland
Leônidas 18', 93', 104'; Romeu 25'; Perácio 44', 71'		Scherfke 23' (pen.); Wilimowski 53', 59', 89', 118'

Stade de la Meinau, Strasbourg
Attendance: 13,452
Referee: Ivan Eklind (Sweden)

5 June 1938
17:00 WEST (UTC+01:00)

Czechoslovakia	3–0 (a.e.t.)	Netherlands
Košťálek 93'; Nejedlý 111'; Zeman 118'

Stade Municipal, Le Havre
Attendance: 11,000
Referee: Lucien Leclercq (France)

==== Replays ====
9 June 1938
18:00 WEST (UTC+01:00)

Switzerland	4–2	Germany
Walaschek 42'; Bickel 64'; Abegglen 75', 78'		Hahnemann 8'; Lörtscher 22' (o.g.)

Parc des Princes, Paris
Attendance: 20,025
Referee: Ivan Eklind (Sweden)

9 June 1938
18:00 WEST (UTC+01:00)

Cuba	2–1	Romania
Socorro 51'; Fernández 57'		Dobay 35'

Stade du T.O.E.C., Toulouse
Attendance: 8,000
Referee: Alfred Birlem (Germany)

=== Quarter-finals ===
12 June 1938
17:00 WEST (UTC+01:00)

Hungary	2–0	Switzerland
G. Sárosi 40'; Zsengellér 89' (Note: RSSSF credits this goal as coming in the 90th minute.)

Stade Victor Boucquey, Lille
Attendance: 15,000
Referee: Rinaldo Barlassina (Italy)

12 June 1938
17:00 WEST (UTC+01:00)

Sweden	8–0	Cuba
H. Andersson 9', 81', 89' (Note: RSSSF credits the 81st-minute goal as coming in the 61st minute.); Wetterström 22', 37', 44'; Keller 80' (Note: RSSSF credits goal in the 80th minute as coming in the 60th minute.); Nyberg 84' (Note: RSSSF credits this goal as coming in the 89th minute.)

Stade du Fort Carré, Antibes
Attendance: 7,000
Referee: Augustin Krist (Czechoslovakia)

12 June 1938
17:00 WEST (UTC+01:00)

Italy	3–1	France
Colaussi 9'; Piola 51', 72'		Heisserer 10'

Stade Olympique de Colombes, Colombes
Attendance: 58,455
Referee: Louis Baert (Belgium)

12 June 1938
17:00 WEST (UTC+01:00)

Brazil	1–1 (a.e.t.)	Czechoslovakia
Leônidas 30'		Nejedlý 65' (pen.)

Parc Lescure, Bordeaux
Attendance: 22,021
Referee: Pál von Hertzka (Hungary)

==== Replay ====
14 June 1938
18:00 WEST (UTC+01:00)

Brazil	2–1	Czechoslovakia
Leônidas 57'; Roberto 62' (Note: FIFA initially credited this goal to Leônidas, but changed it to Roberto in 2006.)		Kopecký 25'

Parc Lescure, Bordeaux
Attendance: 18,141
Referee: Georges Capdeville (France)

=== Semi-finals ===
16 June 1938
18:00 WEST (UTC+01:00)

Hungary	5–1	Sweden
Jacobsson 19' (o.g.); Titkos 37'; Zsengellér 39', 85'; G. Sárosi 65'		Nyberg 1'

Parc des Princes, Paris
Attendance: 20,000
Referee: Lucien Leclercq (France)

16 June 1938
18:00 WEST (UTC+01:00)

Italy	2–1	Brazil
Colaussi 51'; Meazza 60' (pen.)		Romeu 87'

Stade Vélodrome, Marseille
Attendance: 33,000
Referee: Hans Wüthrich (Switzerland)

=== Match for third place ===
19 June 1938
17:00 WEST (UTC+01:00)

Brazil	4–2	Sweden
Romeu 44'; Leônidas 63', 74'; Perácio 80'		Jonasson 28'; Nyberg 38'

Parc Lescure, Bordeaux
Attendance: 12,000
Referee: John Langenus (Belgium)

=== Final ===
19 June 1938
17:00 (WEST)

Italy	4–2	Hungary
Colaussi 6', 35'; Piola 16', 82'		Titkos 8'; G. Sárosi 70'

Stade Olympique de Colombes, Paris
Attendance: 45,000
Referee: Georges Capdeville (France)

== Statistics ==
=== Goalscorers ===
With seven goals, Leônidas was the top scorer in the tournament. In total, 84 goals were scored by 42 players, with two of them credited as own goals.

7 goals

- (Brazil) Leônidas

5 goals

- (Hungary) György Sárosi
- (Hungary) Gyula Zsengellér
- (Italy) Silvio Piola

4 goals

- (Italy) Gino Colaussi
- (Poland) Ernest Wilimowski

3 goals

- (Brazil) Perácio
- (Brazil) Romeu
- (Cuba) Héctor Socorro
- (Sweden) Harry Andersson
- (Sweden) Arne Nyberg
- (Sweden) Gustav Wetterström
- (Switzerland) André Abegglen

2 goals

- (Czechoslovakia) Oldřich Nejedlý
- (France) Jean Nicolas
- (Hungary) Pál Titkos
- (Romania) Ștefan Dobay

1 goal

- (Belgium) Henri Isemborghs
- (Brazil) Roberto
- (Cuba) Tomás Fernández
- (Cuba) José Magriñá
- (Czechoslovakia) Vlastimil Kopecký
- (Czechoslovakia) Josef Košťálek
- (Czechoslovakia) Josef Zeman
- (France) Oscar Heisserer
- (France) Émile Veinante
- (Germany) Josef Gauchel
- (Germany) Wilhelm Hahnemann
- (Hungary) Vilmos Kohut
- (Hungary) Géza Toldi
- (Italy) Pietro Ferraris
- (Italy) Giuseppe Meazza
- (Norway) Arne Brustad
- (Poland) Fryderyk Scherfke
- (Romania) Iuliu Barátky
- (Romania) Silviu Bindea
- (Sweden) Tore Keller
- (Sweden) Sven Jonasson
- (Switzerland) Alfred Bickel
- (Switzerland) Eugen Walaschek

1 own goal

- (Sweden) Sven Jacobsson (playing against Hungary)
- (Switzerland) Ernst Lörtscher (playing against Germany)

=== Team of the Tournament ===
FIFA published the following players for the 1938 FIFA World Cup All-Star Team.

Goalkeeper	Defenders	Midfielders	Forwards
(Czech Republic) František Plánička	(Brazil) Domingos da Guia (Italy) Pietro Rava	(Brazil) Zezé Procópio (Italy) Michele Andreolo (Italy) Ugo Locatelli	(Sweden) Arne Nyberg (Italy) Giuseppe Meazza (Brazil) Leônidas (Hungary) György Sárosi (Hungary) Pál Titkos

=== Tournament ranking ===
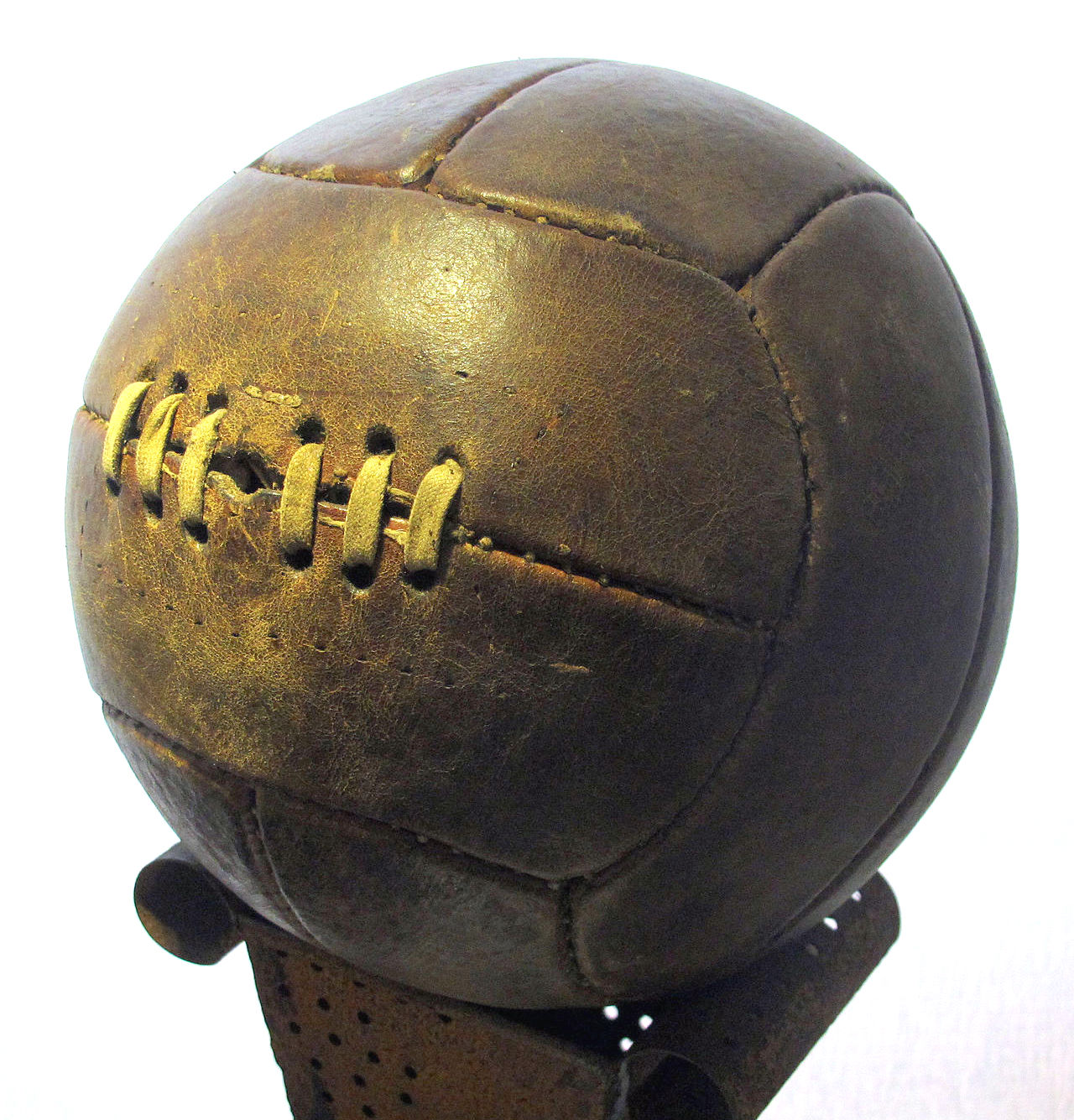
A ball from the tournament

In 1986, FIFA published a report that ranked all teams in each World Cup up to and including 1986, based on progress in the competition and overall results (not counting replay results). The rankings for the 1938 tournament were as follows:

Per statistical convention in football, matches decided in extra time are counted as wins and losses. Per FIFA's ranking, the results of replays are not considered in the tournament ranking.

Pos	Team	Pld	W	D	L	GF	GA	GD	Pts	Final result
1	Italy	4	4	0	0	11	5	+6	8	Champions
2	Hungary	4	3	0	1	15	5	+10	6	Runners-up
3	Brazil	4	2	1	1	12	10	+2	5 (Note: Brazil's record including the replay: 5 pld, 3 won, 1 drawn, 1 lost, 14 GF, 11 GA, +3 GD, 7 pts.)	Third place
4	Sweden	3	1	0	2	11	9	+2	2	Fourth place
5	Czechoslovakia	2	1	1	0	4	1	+3	3 (Note: Czechoslovakia's record including the replay: 3 pld, 1 won, 1 drawn, 1 lost, 5 GF, 3 GA, +2 GD, 3 pts.)	Eliminated in quarter-finals
6	France (H)	2	1	0	1	4	4	0	2	Eliminated in quarter-finals
7	Switzerland	2	0	1	1	1	3	−2	1 (Note: Switzerland's record including the replay: 3 pld, 1 won, 1 drawn, 1 lost, 5 GF, 5 GA, 0 GD, 3 pts.)	Eliminated in quarter-finals
8	Cuba	2	0	1	1	3	11	−8	1 (Note: Cuba's record including the replay: 3 pld, 1 won, 1 drawn, 1 lost, 5 GF, 12 GA, −7 GD, 3 pts.)	Eliminated in quarter-finals
9	Romania	1	0	1	0	3	3	0	1 (Note: Romania's record including the replay: 2 pld, 0 won, 1 drawn, 1 lost, 4 GF, 5 GA, −1 GD, 1 pts.)	Eliminated in round of 16
10	Germany	1	0	1	0	1	1	0	1 (Note: Germany's record including the replay: 2 pld, 0 won, 1 drawn, 1 lost, 3 GF, 5 GA, −2 GD, 1 pts.)	Eliminated in round of 16
11	Poland	1	0	0	1	5	6	−1	0	Eliminated in round of 16
12	Norway	1	0	0	1	1	2	−1	0	Eliminated in round of 16
13	Belgium	1	0	0	1	1	3	−2	0	Eliminated in round of 16
14	Netherlands	1	0	0	1	0	3	−3	0	Eliminated in round of 16
15	Dutch East Indies	1	0	0	1	0	6	−6	0	Eliminated in round of 16

Source: FIFA
(H) Hosts
