= Gino Colaussi =

Italian footballer (1914–1991)

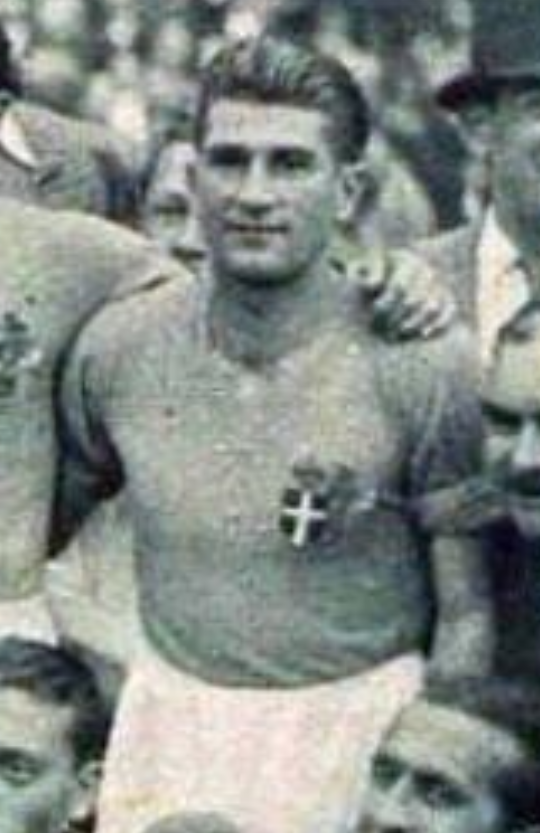
- Colaussi in 1938

Personal information
- Full name: Luigi Colausig
- Date of birth: 4 March 1914
- Place of birth: Gradisca d'Isonzo, Austria-Hungary
- Date of death: 27 July 1991 (aged 77)
- Place of death: Trieste, Italy
- Position: Forward

Senior career*
Years	Team	Apps	(Gls)
1930–1940	Triestina	248	(42)
1940–1942	Juventus	40	(7)
1942–1945	Vicenza	47	(23)
1945–1946	Triestina	23	(3)
1946–1948	Padova	45	(12)
1948-1949	Thiene	?	(?)
1949–1950	Ternana	14	(2)
1950–1951	Tharros	?	(?)
1951–1952	Olbia	7	(1)

International career
1935–1940	Italy	26	(15)

Managerial career
- 1948–1949: Thiene
- 1949–1950: Ternana
- 1950–1951: Tharros
- 1951–1953: Olbia
- 1956-1957: Campobasso
- 1957: Milazzo
- 1959–1961: Alcamo
- 1963: Triestina
- 1967–1968: Alcamo
- 1969–1970: Latina
Medal record
Men's Football
Representing Italy
FIFA World Cup
Winner	1938 France
Central European International Cup
Winner	1933–1935
- * Club domestic league appearances and goals

Luigi Colausig (4 March 1914 – 27 July 1991), known as Gino Colaussi (Italian pronunciation: [ˈdʒiːno kolaˈussi]), was an Italian footballer who played as a striker. He was the first player to score multiple goals in a World Cup final.

== Club career ==
Colaussi was born in Gradisca d'Isonzo, Friuli-Venezia Giulia. He was a striker in Serie A for USC Triestina, Juventus and Vicenza, and also played in Serie B with Padova.

== International career ==
Colaussi represented the Italy national football team at the gold-winning 1933–35 Central European International Cup & at the 1938 FIFA World Cup. He scored a goal in Italy's quarterfinal and semifinal victories, and two in the victorious final, contributing to his nation's second World Cup title with a total of four goals.

== Death ==
Colaussi died in Opicina, near Trieste.

== Honours ==
=== Club ===
Juventus

- Coppa Italia: 1941–42

=== International ===
Italy

- FIFA World Cup: 1938
- Central European International Cup: 1933–35
