= Guido Corbelli =

Italian footballer and manager

Personal information
- Date of birth: 16 March 1913
- Place of birth: Sassuolo, Italy
- Date of death: 30 November 1994
- Height: 1.68 m (5 ft 6 in)
- Position: Winger

Senior career*
Years	Team	Apps	(Gls)
1930–1932	Sassuolo		
1932–1933	Carpi	11	(2)
1933–1938	Anconitana	28	(7)
1938–1940	Venezia	59	(13)
1940–1942	Atalanta	38	(7)
1942–1943	Milan	28	(3)
1944–1945	Parma	6	(1)
1945–1946	Cesena	21	(5)
1946–1947	Venezia	18	(0)
1947–1949	Cosenza	27	(1)

International career
1940	Italy	1	(1)

Managerial career
- 1948–1949: Cosenza
- 1955–1956: Mestrina
- 1959–1960: Forlì
- * Club domestic league appearances and goals

Guido Corbelli (Italian pronunciation: [ˈɡwiːdo korˈbɛlli]; 13 March 1913 – 30 November 1994) was an Italian former professional footballer and manager who played as a winger.

Corbelli played in Serie A with Venezia, Atalanta and Milan, making 113 appearances and scoring 17 goals.

== Playing career ==
=== Club ===
After having spent two seasons in Serie D in Emilian clubs, he moved to Anconitana, where he stayed for five seasons and reached the Serie B. The following season Corbelli moved to Venezia, where he stayed two seasons, the second of which in Serie A.

In the summer of 1940, he moved to Atalanta, in which he played two seasons in Serie A. Then, he moved to Milan, when he played his last season in Serie A in the 1942–43 season.

=== International ===
On 3 March 1940, Corbelli made his first and only appearance in the Italy national football team against Switzerland and scored the Italian goal.

== Management career ==
Guido Corbelli was manager of Cosenza, Mestrina and Forlì.

== Honours ==
=== Club ===
Anconitana

- Serie C: 1936–37
