= Ivan Eklind =

Swedish football referee (1905–1981)

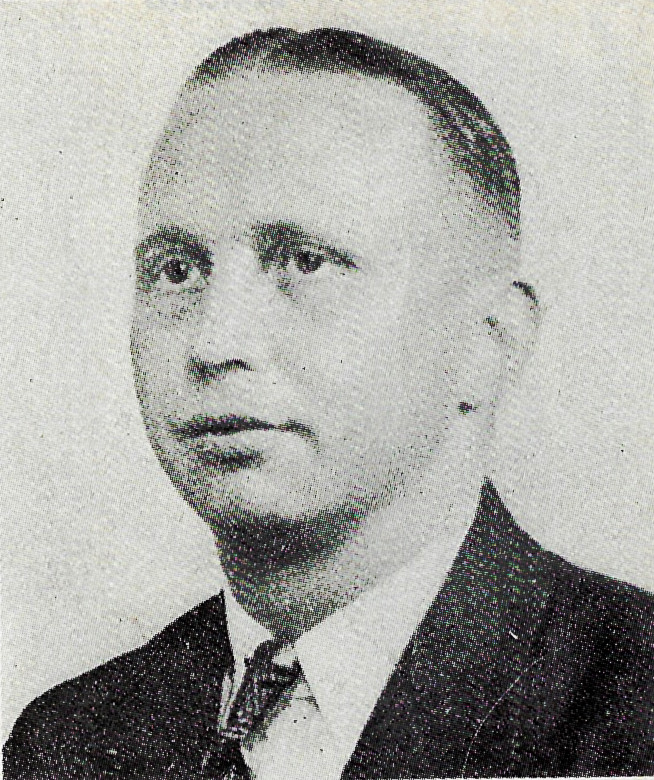
- Full name: Ivan Henning Hjalmar Eklind
- Born: 15 October 1905; Stockholm, Sweden
- Died: 23 July 1981 (aged 75); Stockholm, Sweden

International
Years	League	Role
1931–1951	FIFA listed	Referee

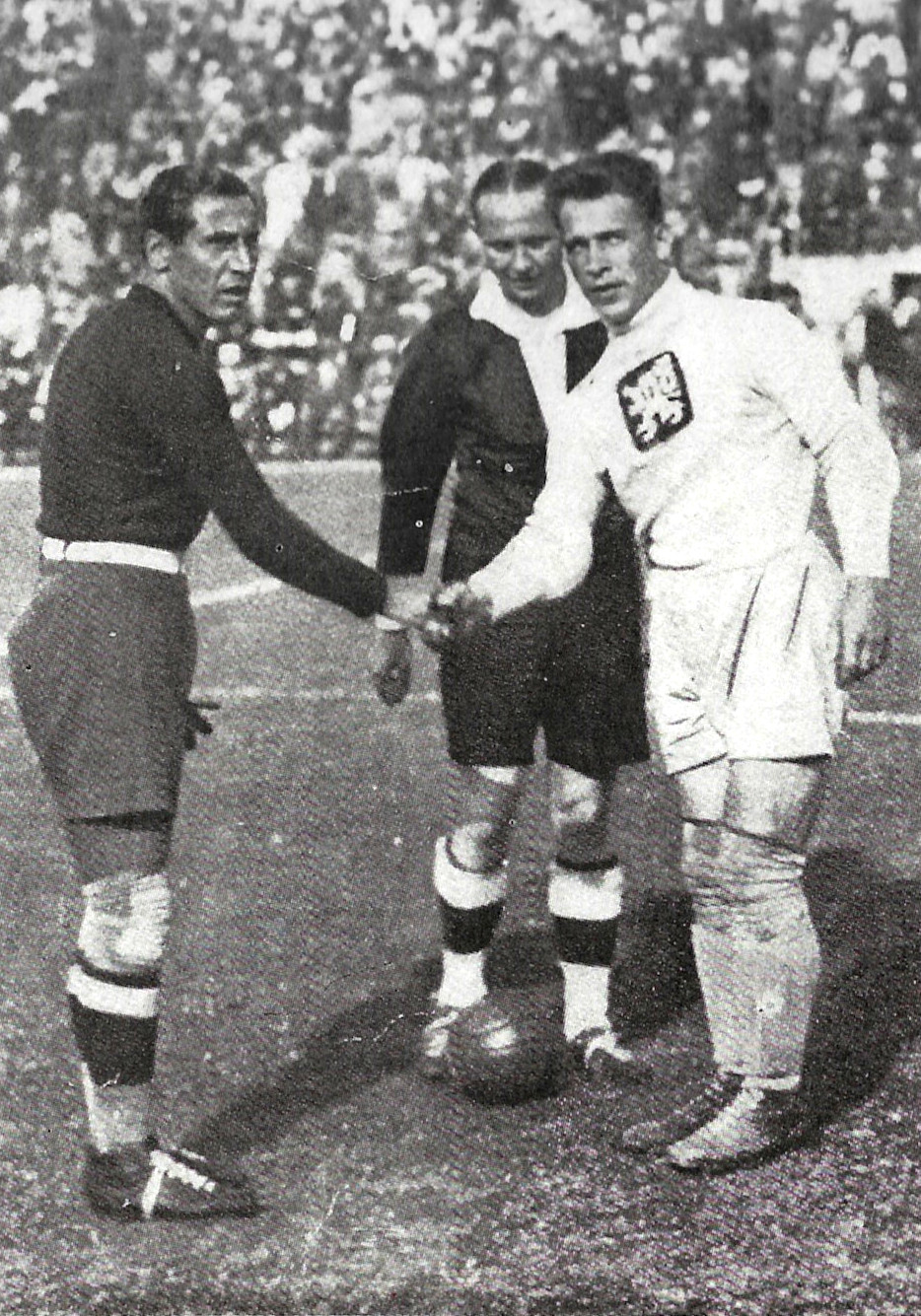
Eklind (center) during 1934 FIFA World Cup final between Italy and Czechoslovakia

Ivan Henning Hjalmar Eklind (15 October 1905 – 23 July 1981) was a football referee from Sweden best known for officiating the 1934 FIFA World Cup final between Italy and Czechoslovakia in Rome. He is the youngest referee, to this day, to officiate a FIFA World Cup final at the age of 28.

== Career ==
Eklind officiated the 1934 FIFA World Cup semi-final between Italy and Austria, as well as the final which Italy won 2–1 over Czechoslovakia. Afterwards he was heavily criticised for having favoured the Italian team with his decisions. According to Canadian journalist John Molinaro, Eklind was said to have met with the Italian fascist dictator Benito Mussolini prior to officiating Italy's semi-final and final games. Compounding these accusations is the fact that he, along with his assistants and the Italian team, performed the fascist salute to Mussolini prior to the match.

Eklind officiated in six World Cup finals matches over three tournaments (1934–1950), as well as becoming one of the assistant referees to Louis Baert (who assisted him in the 1934 final) in June 1938, including officiating Brazil's 6–5 first-round triumph against Poland in Strasbourg, in which 11 goals were scored, and a Group A match at the 1950 FIFA World Cup between Switzerland and Mexico (2–1). Baert also went on to enjoy an incredibly lengthy international career.

== Major matches refereed ==
Date	Match	Tournament	Venue	Result	Ref
10 June 1934	Italy vs. Czechoslovakia	1934 FIFA World Cup final	Stadio Nazionale PNF, Rome	2–1 (a.e.t)	

Preceded by (Belgium) Jean Langenus	FIFA World Cup final match referees 1934 (Sweden) Ivan Eklind	Succeeded by (France) Georges Capdeville
