= Mario Pizziolo =

Italian footballer (1909–1990)

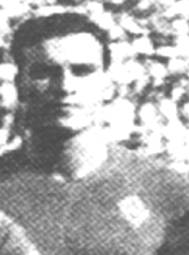

Personal information
- Date of birth: 8 December 1909 (Note: There is some discordance related to Pizziolo's precise date of birth, with some sources reporting 7 December and others 8 December.)
- Place of birth: Castellammare Adriatico, Italy
- Date of death: 30 April 1990 (aged 80)
- Place of death: Florence, Italy
- Position: Midfielder

Youth career
- Livorno
- Ternana

Senior career*
Years	Team	Apps	(Gls)
1925–1929	Pistoiese	74	(0)
1929–1936	Fiorentina	197	(3)
Total		271	(3)

International career
1933–1934	Italy	12	(1)

Managerial career
- 1939–1941: Pescara
- 1941–1942: Richard Ginori
- 1947–1949: Pescara
Medal record
Italy
FIFA World Cup
Gold medal – first place	1934 Italy
Central European International Cup
Gold medal – first place	1933–35 Central European International Cup
- * Club domestic league appearances and goals

Mario Pizziolo (Italian pronunciation: [ˈmaːrjo pitˈtsjɔːlo]; 8 December 1909 – 30 April 1990) was an Italian football player and manager, who played as a central or defensive midfielder.

== Club career ==
Pizziolo was born in Castellammare Adriatico, province of Pescara. He started his club career in the youth teams of Livorno and Ternana, and later played for the Pistoiese senior side (1925–1929), before joining the senior team of Fiorentina, where he played between 1929 and 1936, playing 203 matches and scoring three goals in all competitions.

He retired at 27.

== International career ==
Pizziolo played twelve matches for Italy between 1933 and 1934, scoring one goal. He was part of the gold-winning 1933–35 Central European International Cup squad, and of the side that won the 1934 FIFA World Cup on home soil, in which he played one game, the first leg of the quarter-finals against Spain, in which he got seriously injured, breaking one of his legs, in a 1–1 draw after extra-time. He would not play for Italy again. As Pizziolo could not play any of the other games or the final match for Italy, he was not awarded a medal for his performance until 1988, two years before he died, in Florence, at the age of 80.

== Honours ==
=== Player ===
Fiorentina

- Serie B: 1930–31

Italy

- FIFA World Cup: 1934
- Central European International Cup: 1933–35

=== Manager ===
Pescara

- Serie C: 1940–41

=== Individual ===
- ACF Fiorentina Hall of Fame: 2012

== Bibliography ==
- Baker, William Joseph (1988), Sports in the Western World, Urbana, IL: University of Illinois Press, ISBN 978-0-252-06042-7
