= Enrique Guaita =

Italian Argentine footballer (1910-1959)

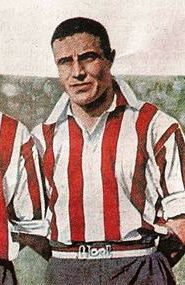

Personal information
- Full name: Enrique Guaita
- Date of birth: 11 July 1910
- Place of birth: Lucas González, Argentina
- Date of death: 18 May 1959 (aged 48)
- Place of death: Bahía Blanca, Argentina
- Position: Striker

Senior career*
| Years | Team | Apps | (Gls) |
| 1931–1933 | Estudiantes | 65 | (33) |
| 1933–1935 | Roma | 61 | (43) |
| 1936–1937 | Racing Club | 57 | (28) |
| 1938–1939 | Estudiantes | 27 | (9) |
| Total | | 210 | (113) |

International career
| 1933, 1937 | Argentina | 4 | (1) |
| 1934–1935 | Italy | 10 | (5) |
Medal record
Representing Italy and Argentina
FIFA World Cup
| Gold medal – first place | 1934 Italy |
Central European International Cup
| Gold medal – first place | 1933–35 Central European International Cup |
South American Football Championship
| Gold medal – first place | 1937 South American Football Championship |
- * Club domestic league appearances and goals

Enrique Guaita (Spanish: [enˈrike ˈɣwajta]; 11 July 1910 – 18 May 1959), also known as Enrico Guaita (Italian: [enˈriːko ˈɡwaita]), was an Italian Argentine footballer who played for both Argentina and Italy as a forward. He helped win the 1933–35 Central European International Cup & the World Cup in 1934 with Italy.

He played most of his footballing career in Argentina with Estudiantes and Racing Club, but also played in Italy with Roma where he was nicknamed Il Corsaro Nero.

== Club career ==
Guaita played for Estudiantes de La Plata, where he was part of the famous attack Los Profesores. In 1934, he moved to Italy, where he probably played his best football. He played two seasons for AS Roma from 1933 to 1935. He was the top-scorer of the League in 1934–35, with 28 goals. He became known as Il Corsaro Nero. Fearing being drafted by the Italian army, in 1936, he returned to Argentina, where he played for Racing Club de Avellaneda and, again, Estudiantes de La Plata. He retired at the end of the 1939 season.

== International career ==
Guaita was one of twelve Argentine players to represent both Argentina (four caps, one goal) and Italy (ten caps, five goals) at national level, before banning the simultaneous playing for more than one national team. With Argentina, he won the 1937 South American Championship, and with the Italy national team, he scored the only goal in the semi-final match of the 1934 FIFA World Cup against Austria to give Italy a 1–0 title win on home soil. He also won the 1933–35 Central European International Cup with Italy.

== Honours ==
Italy

- FIFA World Cup: 1934
- Central European International Cup: 1933–35

Argentina

- South American Championship: 1937

Individual

- Serie A Capocannoniere: 1934–35 (28 goals)
- FIFA World Cup Team of the Tournament: 1934
