= Stadio Nazionale PNF =

Multi-purpose stadium in Rome, Italy

Coordinates: 41°55′38″N 12°28′20″E

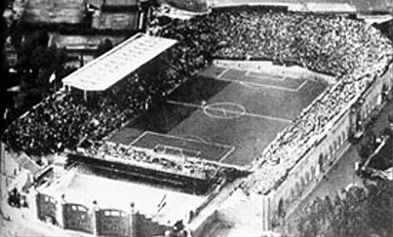
- Stadio Nazionale PNF
- Interactive map of Stadio Nazionale PNF
- Location: Rome, Italy
- Owner: City of Rome
- Capacity: 47,300
- Surface: Grass
- Field size: 105 m × 68 m

Construction
- Groundbreaking: 1911
- Opened: 10 June 1911
- Closed: 1953
- Demolished: 1957

Tenants
- Lazio (1931–1953); Roma (1940–1953)

The Stadio Nazionale del PNF (English: National Stadium of the National Fascist Party) was a multi-purpose stadium in Rome, Italy. It hosted three of the 17 matches of the 1934 FIFA World Cup, including the final between hosts Italy and Czechoslovakia on 10 June 1934.

The Stadio Nazionale was constructed in 1911, and was renovated in 1928 for the Italy–Hungary international match.

The stadium closed in 1953 and was replaced by the Stadio Flaminio in 1957.

== 1934 FIFA World Cup ==
Stadio Nazionale PNF hosted three games of the 1934 FIFA World Cup, including the final matches.

Date	Time (UTC+01)	Team No. 1	Res.	Team No. 2	Round	Attendance
27 May 1934	16:00	Italy	7–1	United States	Round of 16	25,000
3 June 1934	16:30	Czechoslovakia	3–1	Germany	Semi-final	15,000
10 June 1934	17:00	Italy	2–1 (a.e.t.)	Czechoslovakia	Final	55,000

Preceded by Estadio Centenario; Montevideo	FIFA World Cup; Final Venue; 1934	Succeeded by Stade Olympique de Colombes; Paris
