= Louis Baert =

Belgian football referee

- Full name: Louis Andre Baert
- Born: 29 December 1903; Ghent, Belgium
- Died: 11 July 1969 (aged 65); Ghent, Belgium

International
Years	League	Role
1929–1952	FIFA listed	Referee

Louis Andre Baert (29 December 1903 – 11 July 1969) was an international football referee from Belgium, particularly active during the 1930s.

Baert first came to international prominence in the 1934 FIFA World Cup in Italy. He was selected as the referee for the quarter-final match between Italy, the hosts, and Spain. Bert initially disallowed an equalising goal from Italy, but changed his decision after protests from the Italian team. In a 2010 Sports Illustrated article, Georgina Turner suggested that Mussolini's influence may have affected the refereeing at the World Cup.

He was selected to run the line with Ivan Eklind in both the semi-final and the final, and went on to have a lengthy international career as a referee. Baert was also the referee for the match during the 1938 FIFA World Cup in which Italy, playing in their infamous black maglia nera strip, beat hosts France 3–1 in Paris. In total he took part in six World Cup matches.

He first refereed internationals on 9 May 1929 and ended on 28 May 1952. After retiring from active football he became a member of the Executive Panel of the Royal Belgian Football Association until his death in 1969.
