= René Mercet =

Swiss football referee (1898–1961)

René Mercet (1 December 1898 – 13 June 1961) was a Swiss football referee in the 1920s and 1930s. He is best known for having refereed the Italy v Spain replayed quarter-final match in 1934. Mercet is accused of having allowed an irregular goal from Meazza, then of having refused two others for Spain. "The referee conducted the operations with such casualness that he frequently appeared to be Italy's twelfth man" reads the summary of the French sports daily L'Auto. After his return to Switzerland, he was struck off by the Swiss Football Association and FIFA.
