= 1934 FIFA World Cup final tournament =

1934 single-elimination tournament

The final tournament of the 1934 FIFA World Cup was a single-elimination tournament involving the 16 teams which qualified for the tournament. The tournament began with the round of 16 on 27 May and concluded with the final on 10 June 1934. Italy won the final 2–1 for their first World Cup title.

== Bracket ==
Round of 16
27 May – Rome
Italy	7
United States	1
27 May – Genoa
Spain	3
Brazil	1
27 May – Turin
Austria (a.e.t.)	3
France	2
27 May – Naples
Hungary	4
Egypt	2
27 May – Trieste
Czechoslovakia	2
Romania	1
27 May – Milan
Switzerland	3
Netherlands	2
27 May – Florence
Germany	5
Belgium	2
27 May – Bologna
Sweden	3
Argentina	2

Quarter-finals
31 May / 1 June – Florence
Italy (replay)	1 / 1
Spain	1 / 0
31 May – Bologna
Austria	2
Hungary	1
31 May – Turin
Czechoslovakia	3
Switzerland	2
31 May – Milan
Germany	2
Sweden	1

Semi-finals
3 June – Milan
Italy	1
Austria	0
3 June – Rome
Czechoslovakia	3
Germany	1

Final
10 June – Rome
Italy (a.e.t.)	2
Czechoslovakia	1
Match for third place
7 June – Naples
Germany	3
Austria	2

== Round of 16 ==
=== Spain vs Brazil ===
Brazil – who had only kept Carvalho Leite from the squad participating in the previous edition of the World Cup – were outclassed by Spain in the first half, who scored thrice. In the second half, Spanish players played more complacently. Leônidas pulled one back for Brazil, then he scored again moments later, but the goal was disallowed for offside. Later, Ricardo Zamora saved a penalty from Waldemar de Brito.

27 May 1934
16:00 CET (UTC+01:00)

Spain	3–1	Brazil
Iraragorri 18' (pen.), 25'; Lángara 29'		Leônidas 55'

Stadio Luigi Ferraris, Genoa
Attendance: 21,000
Referee: Alfred Birlem (Germany)

Spain	Brazil

GK	Ricardo Zamora (c)
RB	Ciriaco
LB	Jacinto Quincoces
RH	Leonardo Cilaurren
CH	José Muguerza
LH	Martín Marculeta
OR	Lafuente
IR	José Iraragorri
IL	Simón Lecue
OL	Guillermo Gorostiza
CF	Isidro Lángara
Manager:
Amadeo García

GK	Roberto Gomes Pedrosa
RB	Sylvio Hoffmann
LB	Luiz Luz
RH	Alfredo Alves Tinoco
CH	Martim Silveira (c)
LH	Heitor Canalli
OR	Luisinho
IR	Waldemar de Brito
IL	Leônidas
OL	Patesko
CF	Armandinho
Manager:
Luiz Vinhaes

Assistant referees:
Ettore Carminati (Italy)
Mihály Ivanicsics (Hungary)

=== Hungary vs Egypt ===
Hungary scored twice in 31 minutes. Rather than being disheartened, Egypt showed a positive attitude and leveled with two goals from Abdulrahman Fawzi. In the second half, Hungary played better and dictated the tempo, scoring two more goals and deserving to reach the quarter-finals.

27 May 1934
16:00 CET (UTC+01:00)

Hungary	4–2	Egypt
Teleki 11'; Toldi 31', 61'; Vincze 53'		Fawzi 35', 39'

Stadio Giorgio Ascarelli, Naples
Attendance: 9,000
Referee: Rinaldo Barlassina (Italy)

Hungary	Egypt

GK	Antal Szabó
RB	Gyula Futó
LB	László Sternberg (c)
RH	István Palotás
CH	György Szűcs
LH	Gyula Lázár
OR	Imre Markos
IR	Jenő Vincze
IL	Géza Toldi
OL	Gábor P. Szabó
CF	Pál Teleki
Manager:
Ödön Nádas

GK	Mustafa Mansour
RB	Ali El-Kaf
LB	Ibrahim Abdel Hamidu Sharli
RH	Hassan El-Far
CH	Ismail Rafaat
LH	Hassan Raghab
OR	Mohamed Latif
IR	Abdulrahman Fawzi
IL	Mostafa Taha
OL	Mohammed Hassan
CF	Mahmoud Mokhtar El-Tetsh (c)
Manager:
James McCrae

Assistant referees:
Generoso Dattilo (Italy)
Otello Sassi (Italy)

=== Switzerland vs Netherlands ===
Netherlands were narrowly defeated by Switzerland. Switzerland took an early lead thanks to Leopold Kielholz finishing off a good piece of play from André Abegglen. Netherlands equalised with Kick Smit, who converted a free-kick by Puck van Heel. Kielholz restored the Swiss advantage before half-time with a long-range effort. After the interval, the lead was extended thanks to Abegglen's goal. Netherlands frequently threatened the Swiss goal, scoring one from a free-kick, but Switzerland held on for the victory.

27 May 1934
16:00 CET (UTC+01:00)

Switzerland	3–2	Netherlands
Kielholz 7', 43'; Abegglen 66'		Smit 29'; Vente 69'

Stadio San Siro, Milan
Attendance: 33,000
Referee: Ivan Eklind (Sweden)

Switzerland	Netherlands

GK	Frank Séchehaye
RB	Severino Minelli (c)
LB	Walter Weiler
RH	Albert Guinchard
CH	Fernand Jaccard
LH	Ernst Hufschmid
OR	Willy von Känel
IR	Raymond Passello
IL	André Abegglen
OL	Joseph Bossi
CF	Leopold Kielholz
Manager:
Heinrich Müller

GK	Gejus van der Meulen
RB	Mauk Weber
LB	Sjef van Run
RH	Henk Pellikaan
CH	Wim Anderiesen
LH	Puck van Heel (c)
OR	Frank Wels
IR	Leen Vente
IL	Kick Smit
OL	Joop van Nellen
CF	Beb Bakhuys
Manager:
Bob Glendenning

Assistant referees:
Alois Beranek (Austria)
Ferruccio Bonivento (Italy)

=== Italy vs United States ===
A superior Italian team had a comfortable victory against the United States, which had played against Mexico in the qualifying just three days earlier. Schiavio scored two goals in the first half, one of which was from more than 30 yards out. A good performance from the US goalkeeper Julius Hjulian did not prevent Italy scoring seven goals before the final whistle.

27 May 1934
16:00 CET (UTC+01:00)

Italy	7–1	United States
Schiavio 18', 29', 64'; Orsi 20', 69'; Ferrari 63'; Meazza 90'		Donelli 57'

Stadio Nazionale PNF, Rome
Attendance: 25,000
Referee: René Mercet (Switzerland)

Italy	United States

GK	Gianpiero Combi
RB	Virginio Rosetta (c)
LB	Luigi Allemandi
RH	Mario Pizziolo
CH	Luis Monti
LH	Luigi Bertolini
OR	Anfilogino Guarisi
IR	Giuseppe Meazza
IL	Giovanni Ferrari
OL	Raimundo Orsi
CF	Angelo Schiavio
Manager:
Vittorio Pozzo

GK	Julius Hjulian
RB	Ed Czerkiewicz
LB	George Moorhouse (c)
RH	Peter Pietras
CH	Billy Gonsalves
LH	Francis Ryan
OR	Willie McLean
IR	Werner Nilsen
IL	Tom Florie
OL	Walter Dick
CF	Aldo Donelli
Manager:
David Gould

Assistant referees:
Pedro Escartín (Spain)
Bohumil Ženišek (Czechoslovakia)

=== Czechoslovakia vs Romania ===
Romania were the underdogs, yet they went ahead after just 11 minutes with a close range goal from Ștefan Dobay. After Silviu Bindea missed an opportunity to double Romania's advantage, Czechoslovakia scored twice and held on for the victory.

27 May 1934
16:00 CET (UTC+01:00)

Czechoslovakia	2–1	Romania
Puč 50'; Nejedlý 67'		Dobay 11'

Stadio Littorio, Trieste
Attendance: 9,000
Referee: John Langenus (Belgium)

Czechoslovakia	Romania

GK	František Plánička (c)
RB	Ladislav Ženíšek
LB	Josef Čtyřoký
RH	Josef Košťálek
CH	Štefan Čambal
LH	Rudolf Krčil
OR	František Junek
IR	Josef Silný
IL	Oldřich Nejedlý
OL	Antonín Puč
CF	Jiří Sobotka
Manager:
Karel Petrů

GK	Vilmos Zombori
RB	Emerich Vogl (c)
LB	Gheorghe Albu
RH	Vasile Deheleanu
CH	Rudolf Kotormány
LH	József Moravetz
OR	Silviu Bindea
IR	Nicolae Kovács
IL	Iuliu Bodola
OL	Ștefan Dobay
CF	Grațian Sepi
Manager:
Josef Uridil and Costel Rădulescu

Assistant referees:
Giuseppe Scarpi (Italy)
Raffaele Scorzoni (Italy)

=== Sweden vs Argentina ===
Argentina proved a shadow of the team that was finalist in the 1930 World Cup. In fact, they presented a roster of newcomers as only Alfredo Devincenzi and Arcadio López were previously capped by the team. Argentina took the lead with a 25-yard free kick by Ernesto Belis. A more organised Sweden team soon equalized with Sven Jonasson. Argentina showed an excellent attacking prowess and went ahead again with an individual effort from Alberto Galateo. However, an efficient Sweden team took advantage of the defensive weakness of Argentina to score twice before the final whistle and hold on for the victory.

27 May 1934
16:00 CET (UTC+01:00)

Sweden	3–2	Argentina
Jonasson 9', 67'; Kroon 79'		Belis 4'; Galateo 48'

Stadio Littoriale, Bologna
Attendance: 14,000
Referee: Eugen Braun (Austria)

Sweden	Argentina

GK	Anders Rydberg
RB	Nils Axelsson
LB	Sven Andersson
RH	Rune Carlsson
CH	Nils Rosén (c)
LH	Ernst Andersson
OR	Gösta Dunker
IR	Ragnar Gustavsson
IL	Tore Keller
OL	Knut Kroon
CF	Sven Jonasson
Manager:
József Nagy

GK	Héctor Freschi
RB	Juan Pedevilla
LB	Ernesto Belis
RH	José Nehin
CH	Constantino Urbieta Sosa
LH	Arcadio López
OR	Francisco Rúa
IR	Federico Wilde
IL	Alberto Galateo
OL	Roberto Irañeta
CF	Alfredo Devincenzi (c)
Manager:
Felipe Pascucci

Assistant referees:
Albino Carraro (Italy)
Giuseppe Turbiani (Italy)

=== Austria vs France ===
France took the lead with a goal from Jean Nicolas, who had suffered a head injury in the early stages of the match. Austria drew level on the brink of half time thanks to a goal from the star Matthias Sindelar. An uneventful second half followed, so the match became the first in the history of World Cup to go to extra time. In the extra time, Austria prevailed and scored twice before France got a late second goal from the spot.

27 May 1934
16:00 CET (UTC+01:00)

Austria	3–2 (a.e.t.)	France
Sindelar 44'; Schall 93'; Bican 109'		Nicolas 18'; Verriest 116' (pen.)

Stadio Benito Mussolini, Turin
Attendance: 16,000
Referee: Johannes van Moorsel (Netherlands)

Austria	France

GK	Peter Platzer
RB	Franz Cisar
LB	Karl Sesta
RH	Franz Wagner
CH	Josef Smistik (c)
LH	Johann Urbanek
OR	Karl Zischek
IR	Josef Bican
IL	Anton Schall
OL	Rudolf Viertl
CF	Matthias Sindelar
Manager:
Hugo Meisl

GK	Alex Thépot
RB	Jacques Mairesse
LB	Étienne Mattler
RH	Edmond Delfour
CH	Georges Verriest (c)
LH	Noël Liétaer
OR	Fritz Keller
IR	Joseph Alcazar
IL	Roger Rio
OL	Alfred Aston
CF	Jean Nicolas
Manager:
Sid Kimpton

Assistant referees:
Camillo Caironi (Italy)
Louis Baert (Belgium)

=== Germany vs Belgium ===
A clinical Germany took their chance to achieve a scoreline that did not reflect the balance of the game. Belgium closed the first half in the lead, however, Germany came out stronger from the dressing room and overturned the results. Edmund Conen scored a hat-trick.

27 May 1934
16:00 CET (UTC+01:00)

Germany	5–2	Belgium
Kobierski 25'; Siffling 49'; Conen 66', 70', 87'		Voorhoof 29', 43'

Stadio Giovanni Berta, Florence
Attendance: 8,000
Referee: Francesco Mattea (Italy)

Germany	Belgium

GK	Willibald Kreß
RB	Sigmund Haringer
LB	Hans Schwartz
RH	Paul Janes
CH	Fritz Szepan (c)
LH	Paul Zielinski
OR	Ernst Lehner
IR	Karl Hohmann
IL	Otto Siffling
OL	Stanislaus Kobierski
CF	Edmund Conen
Manager:
Otto Nerz

GK	André Vandewyer
RB	Philibert Smellinckx
LB	Constant Joacim
RH	Frans Peeraer
CH	Félix Welkenhuysen (c)
LH	Jean Claessens
OR	François Devries
IR	Bernard Voorhoof
IL	Laurent Grimmonprez
OL	Albert Heremans
CF	Jean Capelle
Manager:
Hector Goetinck

Assistant referees:
Ermenegildo Melandri (Italy)
Jacques Baert (France)

== Quarter-finals ==
=== Austria vs Hungary ===
An extremely tough game prevented the two teams from truly showing the technical skills they possessed. Austria took an early lead with Johann Horvath, who finished a well-organised team move. Austria doubled their lead in the early stages of the second half. Shortly after, Hungary got one back thanks to a penalty caused by Karl Sesta. The match hung in the balance until Hungary lost two players: Imre Markos was red carded and István Avar got injured. After that, Austria comfortably cruised to the victory.

31 May 1934
16:30 CET (UTC+01:00)

Austria	2–1	Hungary
Horvath 8'; Zischek 51'		Sárosi 60' (pen.)

Stadio Littoriale, Bologna
Attendance: 23,000
Referee: Francesco Mattea (Italy)

Austria	Hungary

GK	Peter Platzer
RB	Franz Cisar
LB	Karl Sesta
RH	Franz Wagner
CH	Josef Smistik (c)
LH	Johann Urbanek
OR	Karl Zischek
IR	Josef Bican
IL	Johann Horvath
OL	Rudolf Viertl
CF	Matthias Sindelar
Manager:
Hugo Meisl

GK	Antal Szabó
RB	József Vágó
LB	László Sternberg (c)
RH	István Palotás
CH	György Szűcs
LH	Antal Szalay
OR	Imre Markos
IR	István Avar
IL	Géza Toldi
OL	Tibor Kemény
CF	György Sárosi
Manager:
Ödön Nádas

Assistant referees:
Pedro Escartín (Spain)
Alfred Birlem (Germany)

=== Italy vs Spain ===
The first game between Italy and Spain was one of the most contentious and marred by several poor refereeing decisions, especially seeing Italy players challenging roughly the goalkeeper Ricardo Zamora. Spain went ahead with Luis Regueiro, but their lead did not last long. Italy equalized when Giovanni Ferrari knocked in a rebound, while Zamora was blocked off by Schiavio. The tie required a replay to settle.

31 May 1934
16:30 CET (UTC+01:00)

Italy	1–1 (a.e.t.)	Spain
Ferrari 44'		Regueiro 30'

Stadio Giovanni Berta, Florence
Attendance: 35,000
Referee: Louis Baert (Belgium)

Italy	Spain

GK	Gianpiero Combi (c)
RB	Eraldo Monzeglio
LB	Luigi Allemandi
RH	Mario Pizziolo
CH	Luis Monti
LH	Armando Castellazzi
OR	Enrique Guaita
IR	Giuseppe Meazza
IL	Giovanni Ferrari
OL	Raimundo Orsi
CF	Angelo Schiavio
Manager:
Vittorio Pozzo

GK	Ricardo Zamora (c)
RB	Ciriaco
LB	Jacinto Quincoces
RH	Leonardo Cilaurren
CH	José Muguerza
LH	Fede
OR	Lafuente
IR	José Iraragorri
IL	Luis Regueiro
OL	Guillermo Gorostiza
CF	Isidro Lángara
Manager:
Amadeo García

Assistant referees:
Bohumil Ženišek (Czechoslovakia)
Mihály Ivanicsics (Hungary)

=== Germany vs Sweden ===
Pouring rain influenced the match, which saw very few notable moments in the first half. In the second half, Ernst Andersson suffered a head injury, and Germany took the lead with Karl Hohmann while the Swedish player was off. Hohmann scored again three minutes later. Sweden managed to get a goal back, but their subsequent efforts were not enough and Germany progressed to the first of many semi-finals.

31 May 1934
16:30 CET (UTC+01:00)

Germany	2–1	Sweden
Hohmann 60', 63'		Dunker 82'

Stadio San Siro, Milan
Attendance: 3,000
Referee: Rinaldo Barlassina (Italy)

Germany	Sweden

GK	Willibald Kreß
RB	Sigmund Haringer
LB	Willy Busch
RH	Rudolf Gramlich
CH	Fritz Szepan (c)
LH	Paul Zielinski
OR	Ernst Lehner
IR	Karl Hohmann
IL	Otto Siffling
OL	Stanislaus Kobierski
CF	Edmund Conen
Manager:
Otto Nerz

GK	Anders Rydberg
RB	Nils Axelsson
LB	Sven Andersson
RH	Rune Carlsson
CH	Nils Rosén (c)
LH	Ernst Andersson
OR	Gösta Dunker
IR	Ragnar Gustavsson
IL	Tore Keller
OL	Knut Kroon
CF	Sven Jonasson
Manager:
József Nagy

Assistant referees:
René Mercet (Switzerland)
Johannes van Moorsel (Netherlands)

=== Czechoslovakia vs Switzerland ===
In a well-balanced game, Switzerland took the lead with Kielholz thanks to a counter-attacking play. Czechoslovakia equalized soon after with František Svoboda, who turned a chance created by Jiří Sobotka into a goal. In the second half, although Switzerland dominated the ball possession, it was Czechoslovakia scoring twice and holding on for the victory.

31 May 1934
16:30 CET (UTC+01:00)

Czechoslovakia	3–2	Switzerland
Svoboda 24'; Sobotka 49'; Nejedlý 82'		Kielholz 18'; Jäggi 78'

Stadio Benito Mussolini, Turin
Attendance: 12,000
Referee: Alois Beranek (Austria)

Czechoslovakia	Switzerland

GK	František Plánička (c)
RB	Ladislav Ženíšek
LB	Josef Čtyřoký
RH	Josef Košťálek
CH	Štefan Čambal
LH	Rudolf Krčil
OR	František Junek
IR	František Svoboda
IL	Oldřich Nejedlý
OL	Antonín Puč
CF	Jiří Sobotka
Manager:
Karel Petrů

GK	Frank Séchehaye
RB	Severino Minelli (c)
LB	Walter Weiler
RH	Albert Guinchard
CH	Fernand Jaccard
LH	Ernst Hufschmid
OR	Willy von Känel
IR	Willy Jäggi
IL	André Abegglen
OL	Alfred Jäck
CF	Leopold Kielholz
Manager:
Heinrich Müller

Assistant referees:
Youssuf Mohamed (Egypt)
Jacques Baert (France)

=== Replay: Italy vs Spain ===
The replay was played the day after the first game. The exhaustion and the injuries resulting from the first tie forced Italy and Spain to make four and seven changes respectively. Most notably, the experienced Zamora had to give way to the uncapped goalkeeper Juan José Nogués. Once again, the game was marred by controversial refereeing decisions. In the first five minutes, Crisant Bosch was hacked down by Eraldo Monzeglio in the penalty box. The penalty was not given, but the tackle resulted in the injury of Bosch. With no substitutes available, Spain had to play the remainder of the game with 10 men. Giuseppe Meazza scored soon after from a corner kick situation. In the second half, two Spanish goals were disallowed: one for offside and the other for a foul on a Spanish player. The referee, René Mercet, was suspended in the aftermath of the tournament.

1 June 1934
16:30 CET (UTC+01:00)

Italy	1–0	Spain
Meazza 11'

Stadio Giovanni Berta, Florence
Attendance: 43,000
Referee: René Mercet (Switzerland)

Italy	Spain

GK	Gianpiero Combi (c)
RB	Eraldo Monzeglio
LB	Luigi Allemandi
RH	Attilio Ferraris
CH	Luis Monti
LH	Luigi Bertolini
OR	Enrique Guaita
IR	Giuseppe Meazza
IL	Attilio Demaría
OL	Raimundo Orsi
CF	Felice Borel
Manager:
Vittorio Pozzo

GK	Juan José Nogués
RB	Ramón Zabalo
LB	Jacinto Quincoces (c)
RH	Leonardo Cilaurren
CH	José Muguerza
LH	Simón Lecue
OR	Martí Ventolrà
IR	Luis Regueiro
IL	Chacho
OL	Crisant Bosch
CF	Campanal I
Manager:
Amadeo García

Assistant referees:
Bohumil Ženišek (Czechoslovakia)
Mihály Ivanicsics (Hungary)

== Semi-finals ==
=== Italy vs Austria ===
A torrential downpour hampered the Austrians' passing game while benefiting the more varied Italian game. Italy took the lead when a ball broke free from the Austrian goalkeeper because of an intervention by Giuseppe Meazza. The ball then hit the post and was turned into goal by a perfectly positioned Enrique Guaita. In the second half, Austrian efforts to equalize were stopped by Gianpiero Combi, and Italy managed to hold on for the victory.

3 June 1934
16:30 CET (UTC+01:00)

Italy	1–0	Austria
Guaita 19'

Stadio San Siro, Milan
Attendance: 35,000
Referee: Ivan Eklind (Sweden)

Italy	Austria

GK	Gianpiero Combi (c)
RB	Eraldo Monzeglio
LB	Luigi Allemandi
RH	Attilio Ferraris
CH	Luis Monti
LH	Luigi Bertolini
OR	Enrique Guaita
IR	Giuseppe Meazza
IL	Giovanni Ferrari
OL	Raimundo Orsi
CF	Angelo Schiavio
Manager:
Vittorio Pozzo

GK	Peter Platzer
RB	Franz Cisar
LB	Karl Sesta
RH	Franz Wagner
CH	Josef Smistik (c)
LH	Johann Urbanek
OR	Karl Zischek
IR	Josef Bican
IL	Anton Schall
OL	Rudolf Viertl
CF	Matthias Sindelar
Manager:
Hugo Meisl

Assistant referees:
Louis Baert (Belgium)
Bohumil Ženišek (Czechoslovakia)

=== Czechoslovakia vs Germany ===
The game proved to be a clash of styles, with a more technical Czechoslovakia facing a physical German side. Czechoslovakia took the lead in the first half, but Germany drew level in the second half when František Plánička could not keep out a tame shot by Rudolf Noack. The Germany goal stimulated the Czechoslovak side. Czechoslovakia took advantage of their finesse and attacking prowess to score twice with Oldřich Nejedlý, who completed a hat-trick.

3 June 1934
16:30 CET (UTC+01:00)

Czechoslovakia	3–1	Germany
Nejedlý 21', 69', 80'		Noack 62'

Stadio Nazionale PNF, Rome
Attendance: 15,000
Referee: Rinaldo Barlassina (Italy)

Czechoslovakia	Germany

GK	František Plánička (c)
RB	Jaroslav Burgr
LB	Josef Čtyřoký
RH	Josef Košťálek
CH	Štefan Čambal
LH	Rudolf Krčil
OR	František Junek
IR	František Svoboda
IL	Oldřich Nejedlý
OL	Antonín Puč
CF	Jiří Sobotka
Manager:
Karel Petrů

GK	Willibald Kreß
RB	Willy Busch
LB	Sigmund Haringer
RH	Paul Zielinski
CH	Fritz Szepan (c)
LH	Jakob Bender
OR	Ernst Lehner
IR	Otto Siffling
IL	Rudolf Noack
OL	Stanislaus Kobierski
CF	Edmund Conen
Manager:
Otto Nerz

Assistant referees:
Alois Beranek (Austria)
Pedro Escartín (Spain)

== Match for third place ==
Both teams changed their usual line-ups, resting several players. Austrian players wore an unusual light blue jersey borrowed from Napoli because of the clash of colours between the two traditional jerseys. Germany took the lead inside 25 seconds with the fastest goal of the tournament, scored by Ernst Lehner. They doubled the lead with Edmund Conen, but Austria got one back immediately after with Johann Horvath. Germany's third goal came after Karl Sesta attempted to sit on the ball to ridicule a German player; the ball was stolen by Conen, who crossed to Lehner. Sesta then scored a goal, but Germany held on for the victory.

7 June 1934
18:00 CET (UTC+01:00)

Germany	3–2	Austria
Lehner 1', 42'; Conen 27'		Horvath 28'; Sesta 54'

Stadio Giorgio Ascarelli, Naples
Attendance: 7,000
Referee: Albino Carraro (Italy)

Germany	Austria

GK	Hans Jakob
RB	Paul Janes
LB	Willy Busch
RH	Paul Zielinski
CH	Reinhold Münzenberg
LH	Jakob Bender
OR	Ernst Lehner
IR	Otto Siffling
IL	Fritz Szepan (c)
OL	Matthias Heidemann
CF	Edmund Conen
Manager:
Otto Nerz

GK	Peter Platzer
RB	Franz Cisar
LB	Karl Sesta
RH	Franz Wagner
CH	Josef Smistik (c)
LH	Johann Urbanek
OR	Karl Zischek
IR	Georg Braun
IL	Johann Horvath
OL	Rudolf Viertl
CF	Josef Bican
Manager:
Hugo Meisl

Assistant referees:
Camillo Caironi (Italy)
Pedro Escartín (Spain)

== Final ==
10 June 1934
15:30 CET (UTC+01:00)

Italy	2–1 (a.e.t.)	Czechoslovakia
Orsi 81'; Schiavio 95'		Puč 71'

Stadio Nazionale PNF, Rome
Attendance: 55,000
Referee: Ivan Eklind (Sweden)

Italy	Czechoslovakia

GK	Gianpiero Combi (c)
RB	Eraldo Monzeglio
LB	Luigi Allemandi
RH	Attilio Ferraris
CH	Luis Monti
LH	Luigi Bertolini
OR	Enrique Guaita
IR	Giuseppe Meazza
IL	Giovanni Ferrari
OL	Raimundo Orsi
CF	Angelo Schiavio
Manager:
Vittorio Pozzo

GK	František Plánička (c)
RB	Ladislav Ženíšek
LB	Josef Čtyřoký
RH	Josef Košťálek
CH	Štefan Čambal
LH	Rudolf Krčil
OR	František Junek
IR	František Svoboda
IL	Oldřich Nejedlý
OL	Antonín Puč
CF	Jiří Sobotka
Manager:
Karel Petrů

Assistant referees:
Louis Baert (Belgium)
Mihály Ivanicsics (Hungary)
