= 1934 FIFA World Cup final =

World Cup final, held in Italy

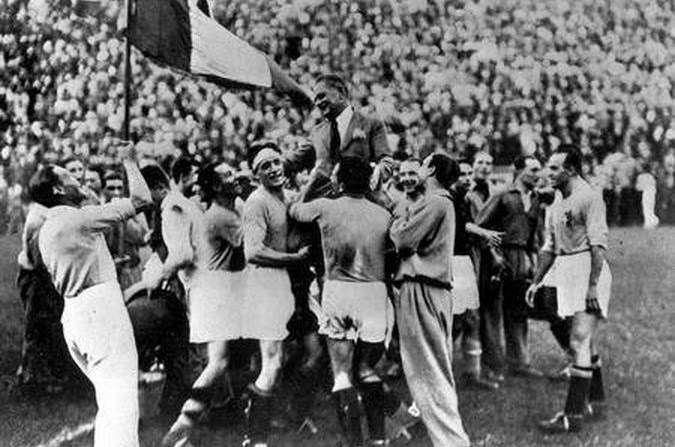
- Italy are champions
- Event: 1934 FIFA World Cup
Italy	Czechoslovakia
2	1
- After extra time
- Date: 10 June 1934
- Venue: Stadio Nazionale PNF, Rome
- Referee: Ivan Eklind (Sweden)
- Attendance: 55,000
- Weather: 40 °C (104 °F)

The 1934 FIFA World Cup final was the second edition of the football quadrennial tournament match contested by the men's national teams of FIFA to determine the 1934 FIFA World Cup champions: Italy and Czechoslovakia. It took place on 10 June 1934 at the Stadio Nazionale PNF in Rome, Italy.

After going a goal down, Italy came back to win the match 2–1 despite temperatures approaching 40 °C (104 °F).

The last surviving player from that final was Czechoslovakia goalkeeper František Plánička who died on 20 July 1996 at the age of 92.

== Background ==
Uruguay boycotted the 1934 edition due to the lack of European teams in the previous tournament and Argentina was eliminated in the first round of the tournament by Sweden, assured that a previous team would not be defending their title.

This was the debut for each of the finalists in the FIFA World Cup. This was the eleventh contest between the two teams, their immediate previous match being at the 1933–35 Central European International Cup held in Florence, Italy; Italy prevailed 2–0. This leveled the head-to-head in the World Cup match to three all with four draws.

== Route to the final ==
Italy		Round	Czechoslovakia
Opponent	Result	Final tournament	Opponent	Result
United States	7–1	Preliminary round	Romania	2–1
Spain	1–1 (1–0)	Quarter-finals	Switzerland	3–2
Austria	1–0	Semi-finals	Germany	3–1

== Match ==
=== Summary ===
Czechoslovakia took the lead with 19 minutes remaining through Antonín Puč. They held the lead for only 10 minutes as Italy drew level through striker Raimundo Orsi. Without any additional goals in regulation, the match was forced to go into the inaugural instance of a World Cup final extra time. Five minutes after the start of extra time, Italy took the lead with a goal from Angelo Schiavio; they held on for the victory.

=== Details ===
10 June 1934
15:30 CET (UTC+01:00)

Italy	2–1 (a.e.t.)	Czechoslovakia
Orsi 81'; Schiavio 95'		Puč 71'

Stadio Nazionale PNF, Rome
Attendance: 55,000
Referee: Ivan Eklind (Sweden)

Italy	Czechoslovakia

GK	Gianpiero Combi (c)
RB	Eraldo Monzeglio
LB	Luigi Allemandi
RH	Attilio Ferraris
CH	Luis Monti
LH	Luigi Bertolini
OR	Enrique Guaita
IR	Giuseppe Meazza
IL	Giovanni Ferrari
OL	Raimundo Orsi
CF	Angelo Schiavio
Manager:
Vittorio Pozzo

GK	František Plánička (c)
RB	Ladislav Ženíšek
LB	Josef Čtyřoký
RH	Josef Košťálek
CH	Štefan Čambal
LH	Rudolf Krčil
OR	František Junek
IR	František Svoboda
IL	Oldřich Nejedlý
OL	Antonín Puč
CF	Jiří Sobotka
Manager:
Karel Petrů

Assistant referees:
Louis Baert (Belgium)
Mihály Ivanicsics (Hungary)

Match rules

- 90 minutes
- 30 minutes of extra time if necessary
- Replay if scores still level
- No substitutions permitted

== See also ==
- Czech Republic at the FIFA World Cup
- Italy at the FIFA World Cup
- Slovakia at the FIFA World Cup
