= List of foreign Ligue 1 players: H =

This is a list of foreign players in the French Ligue 1, which commenced play in 1932. The following players must meet both of the following two criteria:

1. Have played at least one Ligue 1 game. Players who were signed by Ligue 1 clubs, but only played in lower league, cup and/or European games, or did not play in any competitive games at all, are not included.
2. Are considered foreign, i.e., outside France and its dependencies (Guadeloupe, Martinique, Reunion Island or French Polynesia), determined by the following:

A player is considered foreign if he is not eligible to play for the national teams of France.

More specifically,

- If a player has been capped on international level, the national team is used; if he has been capped by more than one country, the highest level (or the most recent) team is used. These include French players with dual citizenship. Players who played for France but came as foreign players (such as Miguel Ángel Lauri) are also listed.
- If a player has not been capped on international level, his country of birth is used, except those who were born abroad from French parents or moved to France at a young age, and those who clearly indicated to have switched his nationality to another nation.

Clubs listed are those that the player has played at least one Ligue 1 game for.

Seasons listed are those that the player has played at least one Ligue 1 game in. Note that seasons, not calendar years, are used. For example, "1992–95" indicates that the player has played in every season from 1992–93 to 1994–95, but not necessarily every calendar year from 1992 to 1995.

In bold: players still active in Ligue 1 and their respective teams in current season.

== Haiti ==
- Jean Ambrose – Bordeaux – 2015–16
- **Carlens Arcus** – Troyes, Lille, **Angers** – 2015–17, 2024–
- Ernst Atis-Clotaire – Monaco – 1995–96
- Hervé Bazile – Caen – 2014–18
- Jean‐Ricner Bellegarde – Strasbourg – 2019–24
- **Josué Casimir** – Le Havre, **Auxerre** – 2023–
- Jean-Kévin Duverne – Brest, Nantes – 2019–25
- Wagneau Eloi – Lens, AS Nancy, Monaco, Guingamp – 1993–95, 1996–01, 2002–04
- Yassin Fortuné – Angers – 2020–21
- Romain Genevois – Nice, Caen – 2012–19
- Wilson Isidor – Monaco – 2018–19, 2021–22
- Dany Jean – Strasbourg – 2022–23
- Danley Jean Jacques – Metz – 2023–24
- Lenny Joseph – Metz – 2021–22
- Claudel Legros – Angoulême – 1969–70 (fr)
- Jeff Louis – Nancy, Caen – 2012–13, 2015–18
- Jean-Eudes Maurice – Paris SG – 2009–12
- Wilner Nazaire – Valenciennes – 1972–73, 1975–76
- Jean-Jacques Pierre – Nantes, Caen – 2005–07, 2008–09, 2014–15
- Johny Placide – Le Havre, Reims – 2009, 2013–16
- Kenny Quetant – Le Havre – 2025–26

== Honduras ==
- Porfirio Armando Betancourt – Strasbourg – 1982–84
- Alberth Elis – Bordeaux, Brest – 2021–23
- Georgie Welcome – Monaco – 2010–11

== Hungary ==
- János Aknai – Red Star – 1935–36
- László Bálint – Toulouse FC – 1982–83
- Sándor Barna – Montpellier – 1934–35
- Árpád Belko – Antibes, Sochaux – 1932–38
- Gyula Beretvás – Olympique Lillois – 1933–35
- Elemér Berkessy – RC Paris – 1932–34
- Lájos Blaskó – Valenciennes – 1937–38
- György Bobik – Marseille – 1958–59
- György Bognár – Toulon – 1988–91
- Miklos Boros – Club Français – 1932–33
- Márton Bukovi – Sète – 1933–35
- Győző Burcsa – Auxerre – 1985–87
- Károly Csapó – Toulouse FC – 1982–83
- Joan Csintalan – Stade Français – 1948–49
- Imre Danko – Lens – 1949–50
- József Ebner – Montpellier – 1934–35
- József Eisenhoffer – Marseille – 1932–38
- Mihály Eőry – Sète – 1934–35
- Károly Finta – Fives – 1938–39
- Vilmos Frayt – CA Paris – 1932–33
- Jószef Frivaldi – Rouen – 1962–63
- József Gergely – Sète – 1934–35
- Imre Grünbaum – Antibes – 1935–36
- Béla Guttmann – Metz – 1932–33
- István Gyulai – Rennes – 1936–37
- Péter Hannich – AS Nancy – 1986–87
- Béla Havas – Nice – 1932–33
- Belá Herczeg – Montpellier, Alès, Sochaux – 1934–36, 1938–39
- Szabolcs Huszti – Metz – 2005–06
- Sándor Janda-Friedmann – Mulhouse – 1932–33
- Ladislas Kalix – Montpellier, Nice, SC Nîmes – 1932–35
- Jenő Kálmár – Excelsior Roubaix, RC Roubaix – 1933–37
- Géza Kalocsay – Olympique Lillois – 1937–39
- László Kapta – Fives – 1937–39
- László Klausz – Sochaux – 1998–99
- Rezső Kohut – Marseille – 1933–34
- Vilmos Kohut – Marseille – 1933–39
- Mátyás Korányi – Olympique Lillois – 1937–39
- Kálmán Kovács – Auxerre, Valenciennes – 1989–91, 1992–93
- Karoly Kovács – Antibes, Cannes – 1933–39
- János Köves – Cannes – 1932–34
- Attila Ladinszky – Valenciennes – 1979–80
- Ádám Lang – Dijon – 2016–18
- Hermann Leitner – Sète – 1932–33
- Miklós Lendvai – Bordeaux – 1996–97
- Barna Liebháber – Angoulême – 1969–70
- István Lukács – Sète, Olympique Lillois – 1933–36
- Rezső Lyka – Nice – 1932–33
- Imre Markos – Rennes – 1936–37
- Gábor Márton – Cannes – 1993–94
- Ferenc Mayer – CA Paris, Strasbourg – 1932–34, 1936–38
- István Meister – Marseille – 1935–37
- Géza Mészöly – Le Havre, Lille OSC – 1993–95, 1995–97
- János Móré – Olympique Lillois – 1936–39
- Andrej Prean Nagy – Cannes, Marseille, Strasbourg – 1946–52
- Antal Nagy – Marseille – 1972–73
- Antal Nagy – AS Nancy – 1986–87
- Gyula Nagy – CO Roubaix-Tourcoing, Colmar, Sète, Alès, Metz – 1947–49, 1951–53, 1957–59, 1961–62
- János Nagy – Cannes, RC Roubaix – 1932–34, 1936–39
- Loïc Négo – Le Havre – 2023–26
- József Nehadoma – Mulhouse – 1932–33, 1936–37
- György Nemes – Sète – 1946–48
- Ernő Németh – Montpellier, RC Roubaix – 1932–35, 1936–37
- Ferenc Niko – RC Paris – 1932–33
- Ferenc Nyers – Strasbourg, Saint-Étienne – 1946–48, 1952–55, 1957–59
- István Nyers – Stade Français – 1946–48
- Ferenc Odry – Saint-Étienne – 1938–39
- Franz Platko – Mulhouse – 1932–33
- Ouduch Pybert – Alès, Valenciennes – 1934–36, 1937–38
- Gergely Rudolf – AS Nancy – 2005–07
- Károly Sas – Red Star, Marseille – 1934–37
- István Schubert – Nice, Cannes – 1933–35
- Imre Sepers – Antibes – 1932–33
- Vilmos Sipos – Sète – 1937–38
- Lehel Somlai – Le Havre – 1960–61
- Rezső Somlai – Nice, Alès, Red Star – 1932–34, 1935–37
- Jenö Stern – CA Paris – 1933–34
- László Sternberg – Red Star – 1936–37
- György Swarek Sarvari – Montpellier – 1932–33
- Geza Szabó – Olympique Lillois, Rouen – 1937–39
- János Szabó – Sochaux – 1934–39
- Zoltán Szélesi – Strasbourg – 2007–08
- János Szemán – Cannes – 1932–33
- László Szőke – RC Paris – 1951–52
- Andras Janos Toth – Strasbourg – 1950–51
- Mihály Tóth – Metz – 1998–99
- István Turbéky – Bordeaux – 1952–54
- József Vágó – Valenciennes, RC Roubaix – 1937–39
- Béla Várady – Tours – 1984–85
- Gyorgy Varga – Montpellier – 1932–35
- Zoltán Varga – Olympique Lillois – 1932–34
- Gyula Vastag – Metz – 1946–47
- Lajos Weber – CA Paris – 1932–33
- Gyula Weinstock – CA Paris – 1933–34
- Istvan Závodi-Zavadszky – Montpellier – 1932–35, 1946–47
- Pál Zilahi – Alès – 1934–35
- Jozsef Zsamboki – Strasbourg – 1961–65

== References and notes ==
=== Books ===
- Barreaud, Marc (1998). Dictionnaire des footballeurs étrangers du championnat professionnel français (1932-1997). L'Harmattan, Paris. ISBN 2-7384-6608-7.
- Tamás Dénes; Pál Peterdi; Zoltán Rochy; József Selmeci (1999). Kalandozó magyar labdarúgók. ISBN 963-85967-0-8.

=== Club pages ===
- AJ Auxerre former players
- AJ Auxerre former players
- Girondins de Bordeaux former players
- Girondins de Bordeaux former players
- Les ex-Tangos (joueurs), Stade Lavallois former players
- Olympique Lyonnais former players
- Olympique de Marseille former players
- FC Metz former players
- AS Monaco FC former players
- Ils ont porté les couleurs de la Paillade... Montpellier HSC Former players
- AS Nancy former players
- FC Nantes former players
- Paris SG former players
- Red Star Former players
- Red Star former players
- Stade de Reims former players
- Stade Rennais former players
- CO Roubaix-Tourcoing former players
- AS Saint-Étienne former players
- Sporting Toulon Var former players

=== Others ===
- stat2foot
- footballenfrance
- French Clubs' Players in European Cups 1955-1995, RSSSF
- Finnish players abroad, RSSSF
- Italian players abroad, RSSSF
- Romanians who played in foreign championships
- Swiss players in France, RSSSF
- EURO 2008 CONNECTIONS: FRANCE, Stephen Byrne Bristol Rovers official site

=== Notes ===
1. Born in Austria (then part of Austria-Hungary)
2. Born in France
3. Born in Romania
4. Born in Ukraine (then part of Austria-Hungary)
5. Capped for the Czechoslovakia national football team
6. Capped for the France national under-21 football team
7. Capped for the France national under-20 football team
8. Capped for the France national under-19 football team
9. Capped for the France national under-18 football team
10. Capped for the France national under-17 football team
11. Capped for the France national under-16 football team
12. Capped for the Yugoslavia national football team
