= František Plánička =

Czech footballer (1904–1996)

- Plánička in 1934

Personal information
- Full name: František Václav Plánička
- Date of birth: 2 July 1904
- Place of birth: Prague, Bohemia, Austria-Hungary
- Date of death: 20 July 1996 (aged 92)
- Place of death: Prague, Czech Republic
- Height: 1.74 m (5 ft 9 in)
- Position: Goalkeeper

Senior career*
Years	Team	Apps	(Gls)
1919–1921	Slovan Prague VII	22	(0)
?	Union VII	?	(0)
?	Staroměstský SK Olympia	?	(0)
1921–1923	SK Bubeneč	108	(0)
1923–1939	Slavia Prague	196	(0)
	Rudá Hvězda VII	14	(0)
Total		340	(0)

International career
1926–1938	Czechoslovakia	73	(0)
Medal record
Representing Czechoslovakia
Men's Football
Central European International Cup
Silver medal – second place	1927–30 Central European International Cup
FIFA World Cup
Silver medal – second place	1934 Italy
- * Club domestic league appearances and goals

František Plánička (Czech pronunciation: [ˈfraɲcɪʃɛk ˈplaːɲɪtʃka]; 2 June 1904 – 20 July 1996) was a Czech football goalkeeper and one of the most honoured players in the history of Czechoslovak football. He played all his career for Slavia Prague, during which time the club won the Czech league eight times and the Mitropa Cup once. He also became a member of the Czechoslovakia national team, where his first success as a young goalkeeper was helping Czechoslovakia to become runner-up in the Central European International Cup 1931–32 and later became captain during the World Cup finals of 1934 (where the Czechoslovakia team finished second) and 1938.

Plánička was a courageous player, to the extent that in Czechoslovakia's 1938 World Cup match against Brazil, he remained on the field despite having suffered a serious injury. (Note: Although some sources indicate that Plánička broke his arm by colliding with Brazilian striker Perácio, there is a Brazilian source stating that the injury occurred when the goalkeeper collided with the post, while defending the Brazilian's shot. Some sources also suggest that Plánička not only broke his arm, but also broke (or dislocated) his clavicle, or that he injured his clavicle but not his arm, or even that he suffered a broken collarbone.) This injury ended a career that saw him play a total of 1253 matches, in which he conceded only 1073 goals, an average of 0.86 goals per game. He was a goalkeeper of outstanding reflexes and shot-stopping abilities and was also characterized by his sportsmanship, never once being cautioned or sent off in his 20-year career. He was awarded the UNESCO International Fair Play Award in 1985.

Regarded as one of the greatest goalkeepers of his generation, and of all time, in 1999, the IFFHS elected him the best Czech goalkeeper – as well as the sixth best in Europe and the ninth best overall – of the twentieth century. In 2003, he was cataloged as the greatest pre-war goalkeeper in Europe along with other notable keepers such as Ricardo Zamora and Gianpiero Combi. In addition, he is one of a select number of players who have amassed over 1,150 career appearances (the first Czechoslovak and Czech to achieve the feat, since the time matches are recorded).

== Early life ==
František Plánička was born on 2 July 1904 in the Prague district of Žižkov as the eldest of three children of carpenter Karel Plánička. His childhood was marked by his father's long absence during World War I, when he had to help his mother support the family. After finishing school, he learned to be a turner. After his father's return, he could devote himself more to his great hobby, which was football. He played most of his footballing career and lived most of his life in the Czech capital. He first played football with his friends on the street, alternately in attack or goal.

== Club career ==
=== Early career ===
In 1919, the 15-year-old Plánička signed an application for the football club Slovan Prague VII, because he thought that other friends would also go there, but in the meantime, they had become members of SK Bubeneč, so he joined as a goalkeeper two years later, in 1921. Later, he was invited to train with the top-division club Sparta Prague, but he was eventually rejected due to his small height. However, he perfectly compensated for his small stature for a goalkeeper with cat-like agility and excellent observation, hence earning the nickname "Master of Robinsonades".

Plánička remained the goalkeeper of Bubeneč and from March 1923 he also trained at Slavia Prague. Both he and the club wanted to join forces, but Bubeneč refused to let him go, so Plánička eventually stopped asking and simply went with Slavia to a match in Vienna, where he started under the name Jakubec to replace Slavia's injured goalkeeper. However, they failed to keep this a secret and SK Bubeneč sent the whole case to the Commission on Crime Prevention, which resulted in Slavia being fined for the offense, but Plánička could stay with them, an agreement that was officialized in October 1923.

=== Slavia Prague ===
Plánička played with Slavia Prague for 15 years, from 1923 to 1938, which was one of the most successful eras in the club's history, playing a total of 196 league matches as Slavia won seven league titles. He appeared in a total of 969 matches, of which Slavia won 742. Despite being of below-average height for a goalkeeper, at 1.74m (5 ft 8¾ in), he was an effective shot stopper, and his acrobatic style earned him the nickname The Cat of Prague.

In 1929, Plánička helped Slavia reach the final of the Mitropa Cup, which they lost to Hungary's Újpest 7–3 on aggregate. Three years later, Slavia reached the semifinals of the 1932 Mitropa Cup. In the first leg, they beat Juventus 4–0; in the second leg, Juventus had a 2–0 lead after which, according to RSSSF, Slavia resorted to obstruction and time wasting, which extended to the stands to the point that spectators started throwing stones on the pitch; one of the projectiles hit Plánička, causing him a serious injury. Slavia abandoned the pitch and the game stopped, and this led to their disqualification from the tournament.

Plánička also won six Bohemia cups (a domestic tournament) with Slavia, in 1926, 1927, 1928, 1930, 1932, and 1935. His only international title came in 1938, when his club finally won the Mitropa Cup. During his entire career, he played 1253 matches and let in 1073 goals, which means an average of 0.86 goals per game. (Note: František Plánička is credited with 1442 matches by Slavia Prague's official website, but this claim is not in agreement with the majority of the other sources, which give a total of 1,235 matches, or 1,253 matches, which could well be a typo, but in details the total appears to be 1,253.)

== International career ==
Between 1926 and 1938, Plánička played 73 times in goal for Czechoslovakia, a world record at the time and a national record that stood until 1966 when Ladislav Novák earned his 74th cap. Plánička was the national team captain 37 times, another record at the time. He made his international debut on 17 January 1926 in a 1–3 loss against Italy.

=== 1934 World Cup ===
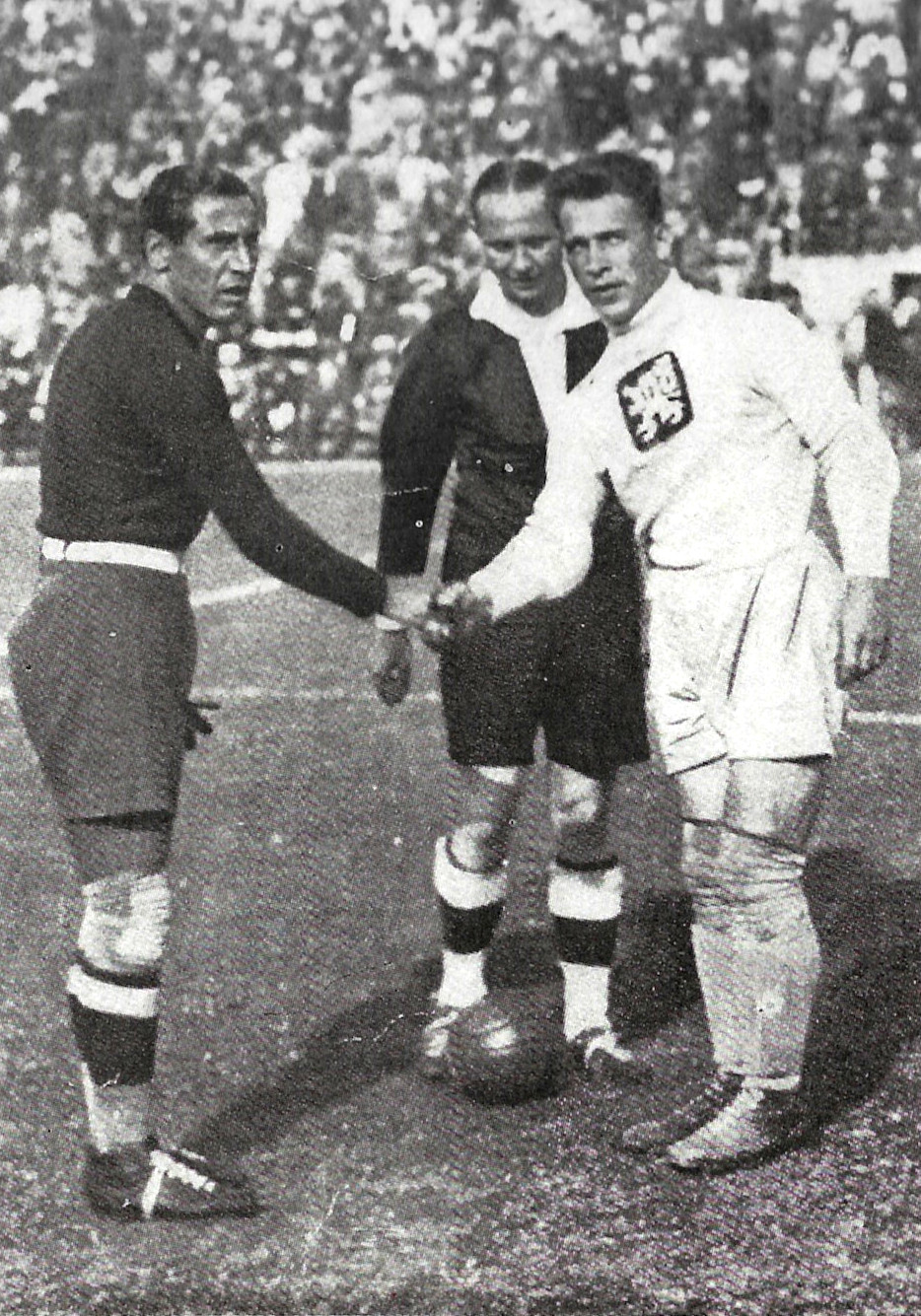
Goalkeepers and captains Gianpiero Combi (left) and František Plánička shake hands at the Stadio Nazionale PNF before the 1934 FIFA World Cup final won by Italy 2–1 on 10 June 1934

Plánička helped Czechoslovakia qualify to the 1934 World Cup, and was the team's captain in the tournament. Despite not being able to keep a single clean-sheet throughout the tournament, he led his nation to victories over Romania in the first round, Switzerland in the quarterfinals, and Germany in the semifinals to advance to the final.

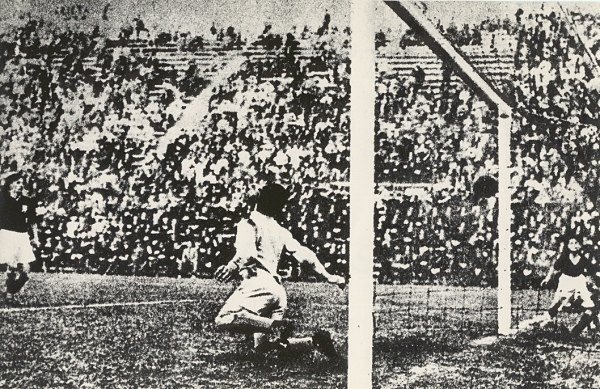
Angelo Schiavio scores against Plánička in the 1934 World Cup final

On 10 June 1934, Czechoslovakia played the final against hosts Italy, who also had one of the great goalkeepers of the time, Gianpiero Combi, as its captain. The Czechs took the lead in the 71st minute with a goal by Antonín Puč, but ten minutes later a shot by Raimundo Orsi beat Plánička for the equalizer, sending the match to extra time, where a goal by Angelo Schiavio gave the Italians the victory. Plánička finished the tournament with six goals against in four matches.

=== 1938 World Cup ===
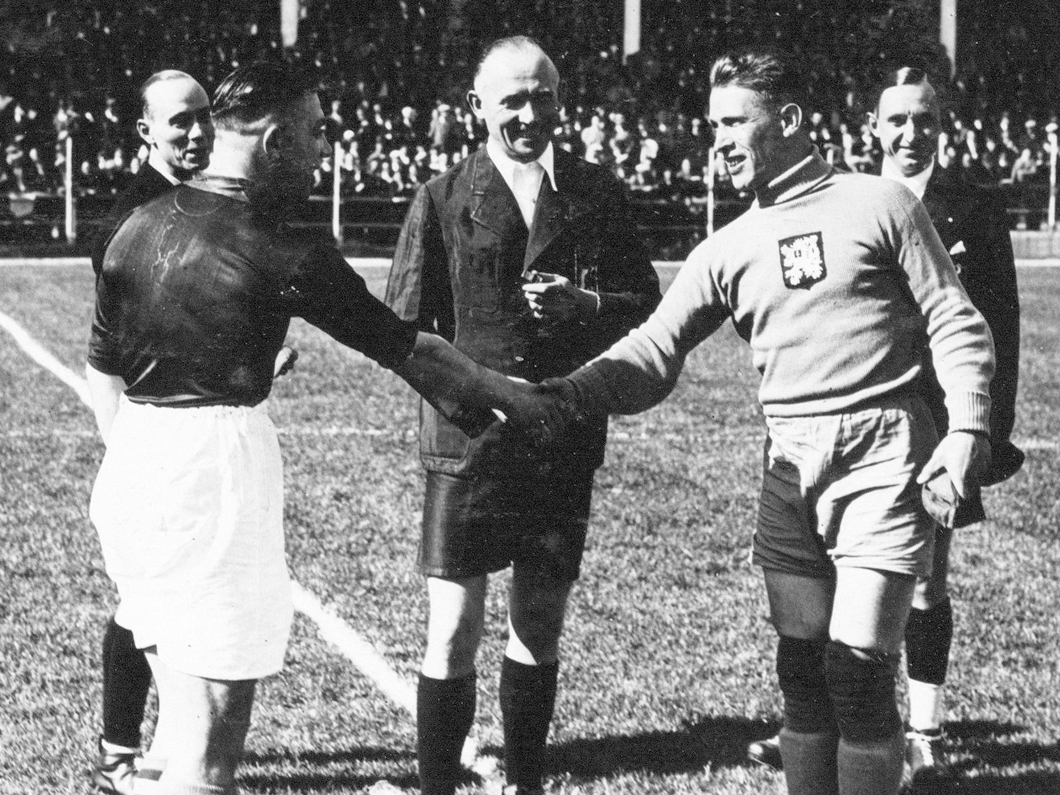
Netherlands Captain Puck Van Heel (left) greets Plánička prior to the match the Czech won (0–3) on 5 June 1938 at the Stade municipal du Havre in the first round of the 1938 World Cup

Plánička captained the Czechs again to the 1938 World Cup. In the first round, they beat the Netherlands 3–0 with all three goals coming in extra time. In the second round, they faced Brazil on 12 July, in what was one of the most violent matches in World Cup history, known as the "Battle of Bordeaux." One Czech and two Brazilian players were sent off, and players from both teams suffered serious injuries. With the game tied 1–1, Plánička's teammate Oldřich Nejedlý had to abandon the pitch with a broken leg, and then Plánička himself suffered a broken arm, after colliding with Brazil's striker Perácio's kick, as the Brazilian attempted to shoot. Plánička did not leave the pitch, however, and instead played through the pain until the end of regulation and through the subsequent extra time, which had no change in the score. The game was replayed two days later, and Czechoslovakia, without Plánička or forwards Nejedlý and Antonín Puč, lost 2–1 and was eliminated. He and Nejedlý ended up in the hospital due to broken bones and these injuries forced Plánička to retire from football.

Plánička only conceded one goal in 240 minutes played, having the lowest goals against average with 0.38 goals per 90 minutes (better than Aldo Olivieri of champions Italy). (Note: Excluding Hungary goalkeeper József Háda, who played 90 minutes without conceding a goal in the tournament.) He was selected to the Best XI of the tournament by a group of journalists. The match against Brazil in Bordeaux was the last one of Plánička's international career.

== Personal life ==
After moving to Slavia, Plánička, who had previously worked as a laborer in various factories, completed basic military service with an anti-aircraft regiment in Prague. He married his childhood sweetheart, Božena Chvojková, and their marriage lasted a lifetime. They raised two daughters together. Plánička was aware of the shortness of his sports career and in order to provide for his family, he graduated from business school. He got a job in the accounting department at the Pension Institute and devoted his free time to football and his family.

After his retirement, Plánička continued to play football with fellow Slavia legends, maintaining a healthy lifestyle and physical condition. On 4 July 1970, Plánička played his last match in goal in a senior team of former internationals. In 1985, UNESCO presented him with an Honorary Fair Play Award in recognition of his footballing career.

In 1994, after receiving a sports merit award, Plánička stated that he would like to see Slavia win the league while he was still alive. In the 1995–96 season, after a 48-year wait, Slavia won the league title, and Plánička was able to celebrate it. Two months later, he died at the age of 92. At the time of his death, he was the last living member of the Czech squad at the 1934 World Cup and the last surviving player from either team to play in the final. Czech national team midfielder Karel Poborský attended his burial, postponing his contract signing with Manchester United, which was scheduled to happen the same day.

== Honours ==
=== Club ===
SK Slavia Prague

- Czech league winner (8): 1925, 1928–29, 1929–30, 1930–31, 1932–33, 1933–34, 1934–35, 1936–37
- Mitropa Cup winner: 1938

=== International ===
Czechoslovakia

- FIFA World Cup Runner-up: 1934
- Central European International Cup: Runner-up: 1927–30

=== Individual ===
- FIFA World Cup All-Star Team: 1934, 1938
- FIFA World Cup Best Goalkeeper: 1938
- UNESCO International Fair Play Award: 1985
- Czech Fair Play Award: 1994

== See also ==
- List of men's footballers with the most official appearances

== Bibliography ==
- Šálek, Zdeněk (1980). "František Plan". Slavné nohy [Famous feet] (in Czech). Práce. p. 26-32.
- Jeřábek, Luboš (2007). Český a československý fotbal – lexikon osobností a klubů (in Czech). Prague: Grada Publishing. p. 154. ISBN 978-80-247-1656-5.
