= Ženíšek =

Ženíšek (feminine Ženíšková) is a Czech surname. Notable instances include:

- František Ženíšek (1849–1916), Czech painter
- Ladislav Ženíšek (1904–1985), Czech football defender and later a football manager.
- 22567 Zenisek (1998 HK33) is a main-belt asteroid discovered on April 20, 1998.
