= Estadio El Serpentario =

Football stadium in San Juan, Argentina

José Nehin Stadium
- Estadio José Nehin
- El Serpentario
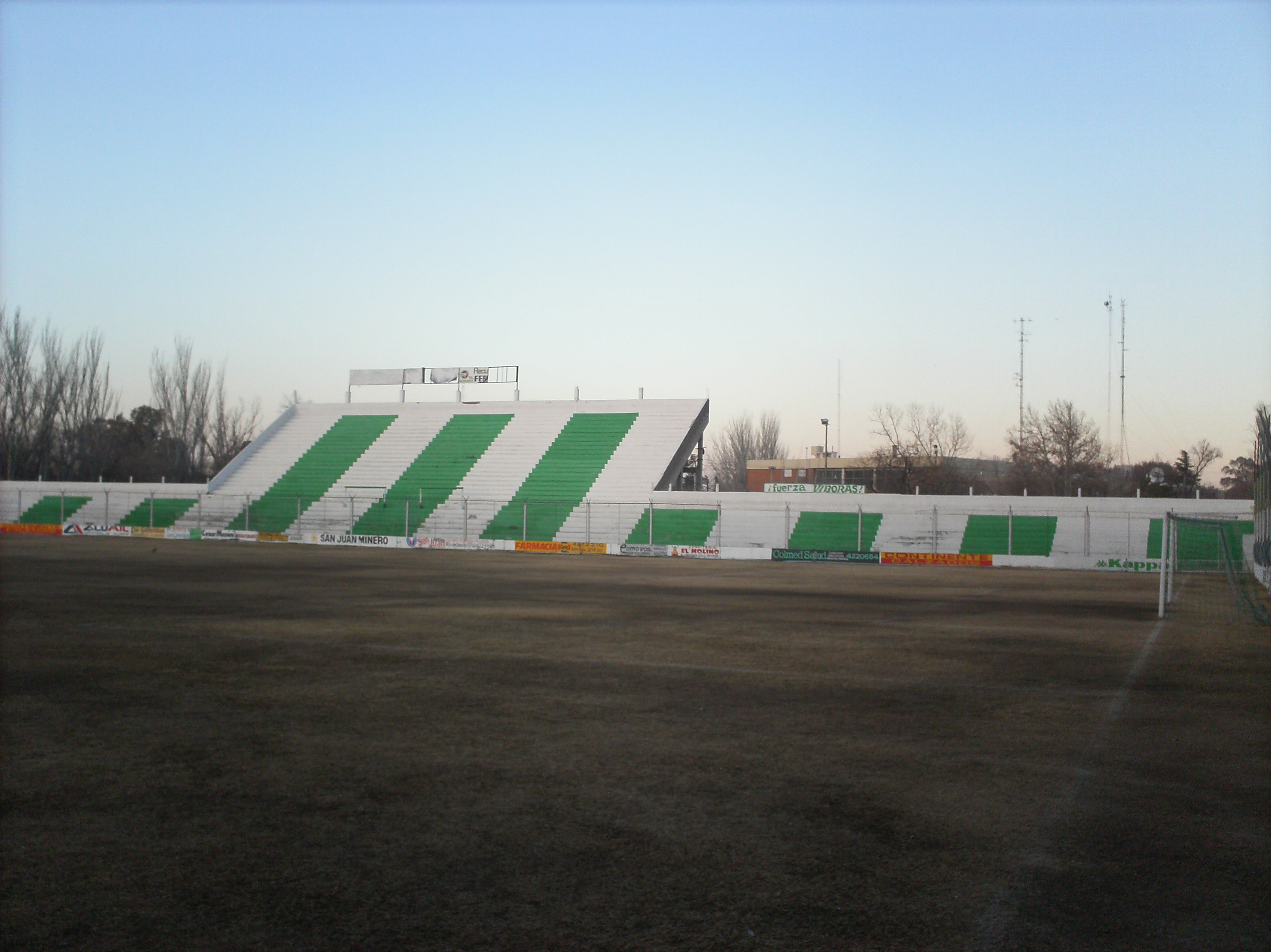
- The stadium in 2011
- Interactive map of José Nehin Stadium
- Address: Esteban Echeverría 99; San Juan; Argentina
- Owner: Sportivo Desamparados
- Capacity: 13,000
- Type: Stadium
- Surface: Grass
- Field size: 100 x 70 m

Construction
- Opened: 5 June 1960; 66 years ago
- Renovated: 2023

Tenant
- Sportivo Desamparados

Estadio José Nehin, popularly known as El Serpentario (the serpentarium), is a football stadium located in the city of San Juan in the homonymous province of Argentina. It is owned and operated by Club Sportivo Desamparados, and has a capacity of 13,000 spectators.

== Overview ==
The stadium was named after José Nehin, footballer of Sportivo Desamaparados between 1920 and 1932. Nehin also played for the Argentina national team at the 1934 FIFA World Cup. He is the only San Juan-born footballer to have played in a World Cup.

The stadium was inaugurated on 5 June 1960. The origin of its nickname, serpentarium, is related to Desamparados' nickname, Víbora (snake).

Estadio José Nahin inaugurated its lighting system in 2007. In 2023, it was replaced by a more modern system as part of several refurbishment works that included toilets and the construction of a restaurant for club members.
