= Urbieta =

Urbieta is a Basque surname. Notable people with this surname include:

- Constantino Urbieta Sosa (1907–1983), Paraguayan football player
- Fermin Lasala Urbieta
- Ibon Urbieta (born 1967), Spanish rower
- Imanol Urbieta
- Juan de Urbieta (died 1553), Basque infantryman
- Nicolás Redondo Urbieta (1927–2023), Spanish trade unionist and politician

== See also ==
- Urbieta street, San Sebastian, Spain
