= 1932 Mitropa Cup =

Tournament details
- Dates: 10 June – 17 July 1932
- Teams: 8

Final positions
- Champions: (Italy) AGC Bologna (1st title)
- Runners-up: (Austria) First Vienna

Tournament statistics
- Matches played: 12
- Top scorer: (Italy) Renato Cesarini (5 goals)

The 1932 season of the Mitropa Cup football club tournament was won by an Italian club for the first time.

The winners were AGC Bologna; after they defeated the holders, First Vienna in the semi-finals, they were awarded the cup as the final was scratched after Juventus and Slavia Prague, who contested the other semi-final, were both ejected from the competition following stone throwing and a pitch invasion in Prague, in what has been described as the worst violence ever in the competition's history. In one incident, Slavia goalkeeper František Plánička was badly injured when he was hit by a stone thrown by a spectator.

Despite the violence, Hugo Meisl, president of the Austrian Football Association, described the competition as a doubly valuable public magnet (Diese Mitropa-Cup-Konkurrenz erscheint ein doppelt schätzbarer Magnet für das Publikum zu sein).

This was the sixth edition of the tournament. Renato Cesarini of Juventus was the highest scorer with five goals.

== Quarterfinals ==
Team 1	Agg.	Team 2	1st leg	2nd leg
Slavia Prague (Czechoslovakia)	3–1	(Austria) Admira Wien	3–0	0–1
AGC Bologna (Italy)	5–3	(Czechoslovakia) Sparta Prague	5–0	0–3
Juventus (Italy)	7–3	(Hungary) Ferencváros	4–0	3–3
First Vienna (Austria)	6–4	(Hungary) Újpest	5–3	1–1

== Semifinals ==
Team 1	Agg.	Team 2	1st leg	2nd leg
AGC Bologna (Italy)	2–1	(Austria) First Vienna	2–0	0–1
Slavia Prague (Czechoslovakia)	4–2	(Italy) Juventus	4–0	0–2^{1}

^{1} The match was abandoned with Juventus leading 2–0 after the crowd, enraged Slavia had conceded two quick goals in the match and resorted to obstruction and time wasting, threw stones onto the pitch. After a stone hit and seriously injured Slavia goalkeeper František Plánička, Slavia's team walked off; both teams' fans invaded the pitch in response, leaving Slavia pinned in their dressing rooms for hours while 1,500 soldiers and policemen formed a cordon. Slavia Prague and Juventus FC were both ejected from the competition.

10 July 1932

AGC Bologna (Italy)	2–0	(Austria) First Vienna
Maini 60'; Sansone 89'

Littoriale, Bologna
Attendance: 18,000
Referee: František Cejnar (Czechoslovakia)

17 July 1932

First Vienna (Austria)	1–0	(Italy) AGC Bologna
Schönwetter 13' (pen.)

Hohe Warte, Vienna
Attendance: 15,000
Referee: René Mercet (Switzerland)

== Finals ==
The final was scratched and Bologna were awarded the cup after Slavia Prague and Juventus were both ejected from the competition.

1932 Mitropa Cup Champions

Bologna
1st Title

== Top goalscorers ==
Rank	Player	Team	Goals
1	(Italy) Renato Cesarini	(Italy) Juventus	5
2	(Austria) Franz Schönwetter	(Austria) First Vienna	4
3	(Czechoslovakia) Vlastimil Kopecký	(Czechoslovakia) Slavia Prague	3
3	(Italy) Bruno Maini	(Italy) AGC Bologna	3
3	(Czechoslovakia) František Svoboda	(Czechoslovakia) Slavia Prague	3
3	(Hungary) György Sárosi	(Hungary) Ferencváros	3
3	(Italy) Raimundo Orsi	(Italy) Juventus	3
