= Rinaldo Barlassina =

Italian association football referee

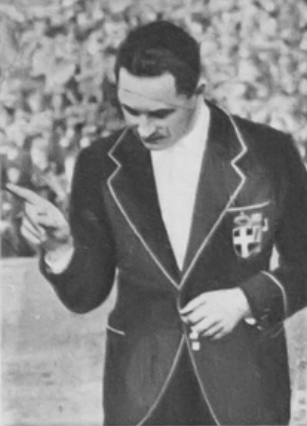
- Born: 2 May 1898; Novara, Italy
- Died: 23 December 1946 (aged 48); Bergamo, Italy
Years		Role
1931–1942		football referee

Rinaldo Barlassina (2 May 1898 in Novara, Italy – 23 December 1946 in Bergamo, Italy) was an Italian international football referee. He was one of the first three Italian referees to officiate in the World Cup (with Francesco Mattea and Albino Carraro).

== Career ==
He officiated 36 international matches and was FIFA referee in 1931–1942. He attributed 4 matches in 1934 (3) and 1938 (1) World Cup, 1938 World Cup qualifying (2), 1936 Olympic Games (1) and others were in friendly matches. He gave a red card in friendly match in 1935 between Hungary-Austria (6:3) to home team footballer Pál Titkos in 88th minute. He also attributed 4 matches in Central European International Cup in 1931 and 1934-1935 editions and 1937 Eduard Benes Cup Romania-Czechoslovakia (1:1) match which all were friendly matches.

In club football he officiated two Mitropa Cup matches in 1931 and 1936 editions which all of them were final matches.

Below are his important matches where he officiated:

Date	Match	Team1	Score	Score	Team2
27 May 1934	WC 1934 Round of 16	Hungary	4	2	Egypt
31 May 1934	WC 1934 Quarter final	Germany	2	1	Sweden
3 Jun. 1934	WC 1934 Semi final	Czechoslovakia	3	1	Germany
6 Aug. 1936	OG 1936 First Round	Peru	7	3	Finland
7 Nov. 1937	WC 1938 Qualification	Bulgaria	1	1	Czechoslovakia
3 Apr. 1938	WC 1938 Qualification	Yugoslavia	1	0	Poland
12 Jun. 1938	WC 1938 Quarter final	Hungary	2	0	Switzerland
