= Albert Heremans =

Belgian footballer

Personal information
- Full name: Albert Louis Heremans
- Date of birth: 13 April 1906
- Place of birth: Merchtem (Belgium)
- Date of death: 15 December 1997 (aged 91)
- Position: Defender

Senior career*
Years	Team	Apps	(Gls)
1924–1942	Daring Club Bruxelles		

International career
1931–1934	Belgium	7	(0)
- * Club domestic league appearances and goals

Albert "Berre" Heremans (13 April 1906 – 15 December 1997) was a Belgian footballer born in Merchtem (Belgium). He was a defender for Daring Club Bruxelles and Belgium before World War II.

He played seven times for the Diables Rouges from 1931 to 1934. He played as a striker in one match for Belgium in the 1934 World Cup, in Florence, against Germany (lost, 2–5).

== Honours ==
- Belgian international from 1931 to 1934 (7 caps)
- Selected for the 1934 World Cup (played one match)
- Belgian Champions in 1936 and 1937 with Daring Club Bruxelles
- Winner of the Belgian Cup in 1935 with Daring Club Bruxelles
