= Eraldo Monzeglio =

Italian footballer and manager (1906–1981)

- Monzeglio in 1934

Personal information
- Date of birth: 5 June 1906
- Place of birth: Vignale Monferrato, Italy
- Date of death: 3 November 1981 (aged 75)
- Place of death: Turin, Italy
- Height: 1.73 m (5 ft 8 in)
- Position: Defender

Senior career*
Years	Team	Apps	(Gls)
1923–1926	Casale	29	(1)
1926–1935	Bologna	245	(4)
1935–1939	Roma		

International career
1930–1938	Italy	35	(0)

Managerial career
- 1946–1947: Como
- 1947–1949: Pro Sesto
- 1949–1956: Napoli
- 1958–1962: Sampdoria
- 1964: Juventus
- 1966–1967: Chiasso
- 1973: Chiasso
Medal record
Men's Football
Representing Italy
FIFA World Cup
Winner	1934 Italy
Winner	1938 France
Central European International Cup
Winner	1927–30
Runner-up	1931–32
Winner	1933–35
- * Club domestic league appearances and goals

Eraldo Monzeglio (Italian pronunciation: [eˈraldo monˈdzeʎʎo]; 5 June 1906 – 3 November 1981) was an Italian association football coach and player, who played as a defender, in the position of full-back. Monzeglio had a highly successful career as a footballer, although he also later attracted controversy due to his close relationship with the Italian fascist dictator Benito Mussolini. At club level, he played for Casale, Bologna, and Roma, winning the Serie A title and two editions of the Mitropa Cup with Bologna. At international level, he also had success representing the Italy national football team, and was a member of the Italian teams that won consecutive FIFA World Cup titles in 1934 and 1938, being named to the tournament's All-star Team in 1934; he also won two editions of the Central European International Cup with Italy. Along with Giuseppe Meazza and Giovanni Ferrari, he is one of only three Italian players to have won two World Cups. Following his retirement as a player, he worked as a coach for Italian clubs Como, Pro Sesto, Napoli, Sampdoria, and Juventus, as well as Swiss club Chiasso. He was posthumously inducted into the Italian Football Hall of Fame in 2013.

== Club career ==
Monzeglio was born in Vignale Monferrato, in the province of Alessandria (Piedmont).

In his nineteen-year career as a football defender, which lasted from 1924 to 1943, he played for Casale, Bologna, and Roma. With Bologna, he was victorious in the 1928–29 championship, also winning two Mitropa Cups in 1932 and 1934.

== International career ==
At international level, Monzeglio played for the Italy national team on 35 occasions, which the team also won two FIFA World Cup finals, in 1934 and 1938, being named to the Team of the Tournament in 1934; he also won two Central European International Cups with Italy.

== Coaching career ==
Despite his success and fame as a footballer, following the conclusion of the Second World War, however, Monzeglio had initially attracted controversy, due to his political views and close friendship with the Italian fascist dictator Benito Mussolini, as well as his role as Mussolini's personal coach. Monzeglio later became a coach, managing the Italian teams of A.S. Roma, Como, Pro Sesto, Napoli, Sampdoria, Juventus, and Lecco, as well as Chiasso, in Switzerland, between 1941 and 1973. Monzeglio died in Turin, on 3 November 1981, at the age of 75. In 2013, he was posthumously inducted into the Italian Football Hall of Fame.

== Honours ==
=== Player ===
Bologna

- Serie A: 1928–29
- Mitropa Cup: 1932, 1934

Italy

- FIFA World Cup: 1934, 1938
- Central European International Cup: 1927–30, 1933–35; runner-up 1931–32

=== Manager ===
Napoli

- Serie B: 1949–50

=== Individual ===
- FIFA World Cup Team of the Tournament: 1934
- Seminatore d'oro: 1959–60
- Italian Football Hall of Fame: 2013 (Posthumous)
