= Roberto Irañeta =

Argentine footballer (1915–1993)

- Roberto Irañeta (1930)

Personal information
- Full name: Roberto Luis Irañeta
- Date of birth: March 21, 1915
- Place of birth: Argentina
- Date of death: November 30, 1993 (aged 78)
- Position: Forward

Senior career*
| Years | Team | Apps | (Gls) |
| 1930–1939 | Gimnasia y Esgrima de Mendoza | | |

International career
| 1934 | Argentina | 1 | (0) |
- * Club domestic league appearances and goals

Roberto Luis Irañeta (March 21, 1915 – November 30, 1993) was an Argentine football forward who played for Argentina in the 1934 FIFA World Cup. He also played for Gimnasia y Esgrima de Mendoza.

== Fifa World Cup Career ==
| National team | Year | Apps | Goals | Assists |
|---|---|---|---|---|
| Argentina | 1934 | 1 | 0 | 0 |
