= Ibrahim Abdel Hamidu Sharli =

Egyptian footballer (1907-2003)

Hamidu
Personal information
- Full name: Ibrahim Abdel Hamidu Sharli
- Date of birth: 1907
- Place of birth: Egypt
- Date of death: 2003 (aged 96)
- Position: Defender

Senior career*
Years	Team	Apps	(Gls)
- Al-Olympi Alexandria

International career
- Egypt
- * Club domestic league appearances and goals

Ibrahim Abdel Hamidu Sharli (1907–2003) was an Egyptian football defender who played for Egypt in the 1934 FIFA World Cup. He also played for Al-Olympi Alexandria.
