= Alfredo Devincenzi =

Italian Argentine footballer

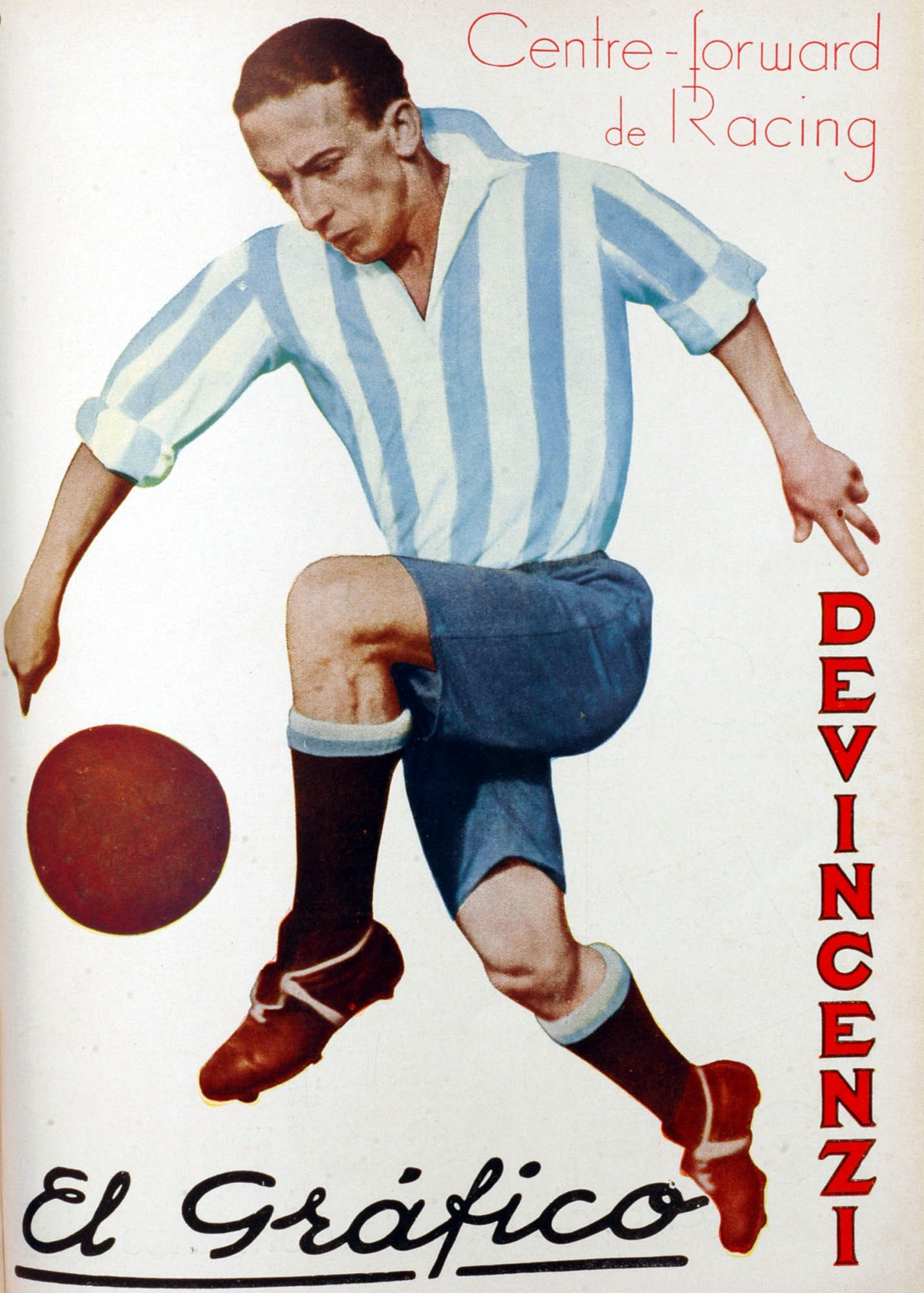
- The Graphic of April 23, 1932.

Personal information
- Full name: Alfredo Ciríaco Devincenzi
- Date of birth: June 9, 1907
- Place of birth: Buenos Aires, Argentina
- Date of death: unknown
- Height: 1.78 m (5 ft 10 in)
- Position: Striker

Youth career
- Estudiantil Porteño

Senior career*
Years	Team	Apps	(Gls)
1925–1927	Estudiantil Porteño		
1928	River Plate	7	(5)
1929–1930	Estudiantil Porteño	31	(23)
1931–1933	Racing Club	52	(32)
1934	Estudiantil Porteño	52	(21)
1934–1936	Ambrosiana-Inter	52	(21)

International career
	Argentina	8	(1)
- * Club domestic league appearances and goals

Alfredo Ciríaco Devincenzi, last name also spelled de Vincenzi (June 9, 1907 – date of death unknown) was an Italian Argentine professional footballer who played as a forward. He represented the Argentina national football team at the 1934 FIFA World Cup.

Devincenzi also held Italian citizenship and later played for the Italy national B team. He is deceased.

He made 52 appearances in domestic leagues, 2 at European competitions and 2 at Coppa Italia.
