= Antonín Puč =

Czech footballer (1907–1988)

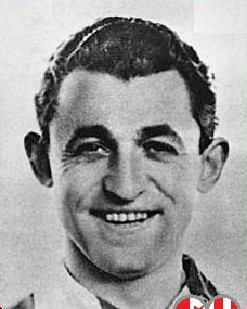

Personal information
- Date of birth: 16 May 1907
- Place of birth: Jinonice, Austria-Hungary
- Date of death: 18 April 1988 (aged 80)
- Place of death: Prague, Czechoslovakia
- Positions: Winger; striker

Youth career
- 1913–1920: Čechie Smíchov
- 1920–1925: SK Smíchov

Senior career*
Years	Team	Apps	(Gls)
1925	SK Smíchov		
1925–1938	Slavia Prague	146	(112)
1938–1940	Viktoria Žižkov	20	(11)
1940–1941	SK Smíchov		
Total		166	(123)

International career
1926–1938	Czechoslovakia	60	(34)
1939	Bohemia and Moravia	1	(1)

Managerial career
- 1943–1944: SK Nusle
- 1945–1946: Čechie Karlín
Medal record
Representing Czechoslovakia
Men's Football
FIFA World Cup
Runner-up	1934 Italy
- * Club domestic league appearances and goals

Antonín Puč (16 May 1907 – 18 April 1988) was a Czech footballer who played as a forward. He was the all-time leading scorer for the Czechoslovak national team.

Puč's international career lasted from 1926 to 1939, during which he played 61 matches for Czechoslovakia, scoring 35 goals. He played for Czechoslovakia at the 1934 FIFA World Cup, scoring two goals, including one in the final — a 2–1 loss against Italy — before going on to play in the 1938 edition. Puč spent most of his club career with Slavia Prague.

Following the dissolution of Czechoslovakia and the corresponding national team, Jan Koller surpassed Puč's record in 2005. Puč died in 1988 at the age of 80.

== Career statistics ==
Appearances and goals by national team and year
National team	Year	Apps	Goals
Czechoslovakia	1931	5	0
Czechoslovakia	1932	5	0
Czechoslovakia	1933	8	1
Czechoslovakia	1934	7	10
Czechoslovakia	1935	6	8
Czechoslovakia	1936	5	3
Czechoslovakia	1937	6	10
Czechoslovakia	1938	5	6
Czechoslovakia	1939	7	1
Czechoslovakia	1940	7	3
Czechoslovakia	1941	0	0
Czechoslovakia	1942	0	0
Czechoslovakia	1943	1	0
Total		62	42

Scores and results list Czechoslovakia's goal tally first, score column indicates score after each Puč goal.

List of international goals scored by Antonín Puč
No.	Cap	Date	Venue	Opponent	Score	Result	Competition
1	1	28 June 1926	Stadion Concordije, Zagreb, Yugoslavia	Yugoslavia	5–2	6–2	Friendly
2	3	28 October 1926	Stadion Slavii, Prague, Czechoslovakia	Italy	1–0	3–1	Friendly
3	5	20 February 1927	San Siro, Milan, Italy	Italy	1–0	3–1	Friendly
4	6	20 March 1927	Hohe Warte Stadium, Vienna, Austria	Austria	1–0	2–1	Friendly
5	7	24 April 1927	Stadion Slavii, Prague, Czechoslovakia	Hungary	1–0	3–1	Friendly
6	8	26 May 1927	Stadion Slavii, Prague, Czechoslovakia	Belgium	1–0	4–0	Friendly
7	8	26 May 1927	Stadion Slavii, Prague, Czechoslovakia	Belgium	4–0	4–0	Friendly
8	9	31 July 1927	Stadion S.K. Jugoslavija, Belgrade, Kingdom of Yugoslavia	Yugoslavia	1–1	1–1	Friendly
9	15	13 May 1928	Stade Olympique Yves-du-Manoir, Colombes, France	France	1–0	2–0	Friendly
10	15	13 May 1928	Stade Olympique Yves-du-Manoir, Colombes, France	France	2–0	2–0	Friendly
11	16	23 September 1928	Stadion Letná, Prague, Czechoslovakia	Hungary	4–1	6–1	Friendly
12	17	27 October 1928	Stadion Letná, Prague, Czechoslovakia	Poland	1–0	3–2	1928 Slavic tournament
13	17	27 October 1928	Stadion Letná, Prague, Czechoslovakia	Poland	3–0	3–2	1928 Slavic tournament
14	18	28 October 1928	Stadion Letná, Prague, Czechoslovakia	Yugoslavia	2–1	7–1	1928 Slavic tournament
15	18	28 October 1928	Stadion Letná, Prague, Czechoslovakia	Yugoslavia	7–1	7–1	1928 Slavic tournament
16	19	5 May 1929	Stade Olympique de la Pontaise, Lausanne, Switzerland	Switzerland	4–1	4–1	1927–30 Central European Cup
17	22	6 October 1929		Switzerland	1–0	5–0	1927–30 Central European Cup
18	22	6 October 1929		Switzerland	5–0	5–0	1927–30 Central European Cup
19	29	2 August 1931	Stadion S.K. Jugoslavija, Belgrade, Kingdom of Yugoslavia	Yugoslavia	2–1	2–1	Friendly
20	31	18 September 1932	Üllői úti stadion, Budapest, Hungary	Hungary	1–0	1–2	1931–32 Central European Cup
21	32	9 October 1932	Stadion Letná, Prague, Czechoslovakia	Yugoslavia	1–0	2–1	Friendly
22	35	9 April 1933	Hohe Warte Stadium, Vienna, Austria	Austria	1–0	2–1	Friendly
23	35	9 April 1933	Hohe Warte Stadium, Vienna, Austria	Austria	2–0	2–1	Friendly
24	36	10 June 1933	Stadion Letná, Prague, Czechoslovakia	France	1–0	4–0	Friendly
25	38	17 September 1933	Stadion Letná, Prague, Czechoslovakia	Austria	1–0	3–3	Friendly
26	38	17 September 1933	Stadion Letná, Prague, Czechoslovakia	Austria	3–3	3–3	Friendly
27	41	29 April 1934	Stadion Letná, Prague, Czechoslovakia	Hungary	2–1	2–2	1933–35 Central European Cup
28	42	16 May 1934	Stadion Letná, Prague, Czechoslovakia	England	2–1	2–1	Friendly
29	43	27 May 1934	Stadio Littorio, Trieste, Kingdom of Italy	Romania	1–1	2–1	1934 World Cup Round of 16
30	46	10 June 1934	Stadio Nazionale PNF, Rome, Kingdom of Italy	Italy	1–0	1–2	1934 FIFA World Cup Final
31	52	9 February 1936	Parc des Princes, Paris, France	France	1–0	3–0	Friendly
32	55	21 February 1937	Stadion Letná, Prague, Czechoslovakia	Switzerland	5–2	5–3	1936–38 Central European Cup
33	57	15 May 1937	Stadion Letná, Prague, Czechoslovakia	Scotland	1–1	1–3	Friendly
34	58	1 December 1937	White Hart Lane, London, England	England	1–1	4–5	Friendly
