= Héctor Freschi =

Argentine footballer (1911–1993)

Personal information
- Full name: Héctor Luis Freschi
- Date of birth: 22 May 1911
- Place of birth: Resistencia, Argentina
- Date of death: 18 July 1993 (aged 82)
- Height: 1.85 m (6 ft 1 in)
- Position: Goalkeeper

Senior career*
| Years | Team | Apps | (Gls) |
| 1930–1947 | Sarmiento de Resistencia | | |

International career
- Argentina
- * Club domestic league appearances and goals

Héctor Luis Freschi (22 May 1911 – 18 July 1993) was an Argentine football goalkeeper who played for the Argentina national team in the 1934 FIFA World Cup. He also played for Sarmiento de Resistencia.
