= Peter Platzer =

Austrian footballer

Personal information
- Date of birth: 29 May 1910
- Place of birth: Austria-Hungary
- Date of death: 13 December 1959 (aged 49)
- Position: Goalkeeper

Senior career*
Years	Team	Apps	(Gls)
1927–1929	Brigittenauer AC		
1929–1934	Floridsdorfer AC		
1934–1940	FC Admira Wacker Mödling		

International career
1931–1937	Austria	31	(0)
1939	Germany	2	(0)
- * Club domestic league appearances and goals

Peter Platzer (29 May 1910 – 13 December 1959) was an Austrian football goalkeeper who played for Austria in the 1934 FIFA World Cup. He later played two games for Germany. He also played for Brigittenauer AC, Floridsdorfer AC, and FC Admira Wacker Mödling.
