= Rudolf Viertl =

Austrian footballer

Personal information
- Date of birth: 12 November 1902
- Place of birth: Austria-Hungary
- Date of death: 9 December 1981 (aged 79)
- Position: Forward

Senior career*
Years	Team	Apps	(Gls)
1924–1928	1. Simmeringer Sportclub		
1928–1939	FK Austria Wien		
- Germania Schwechat
- Brunn

International career
1925–1937	Austria	16	(4)
- * Club domestic league appearances and goals

Rudolf Viertl (12 November 1902 – 9 December 1981) was an Austrian football forward who played for Austria in the 1934 FIFA World Cup. He also played for FK Austria Wien.
