= Arcadio López =

Argentine footballer

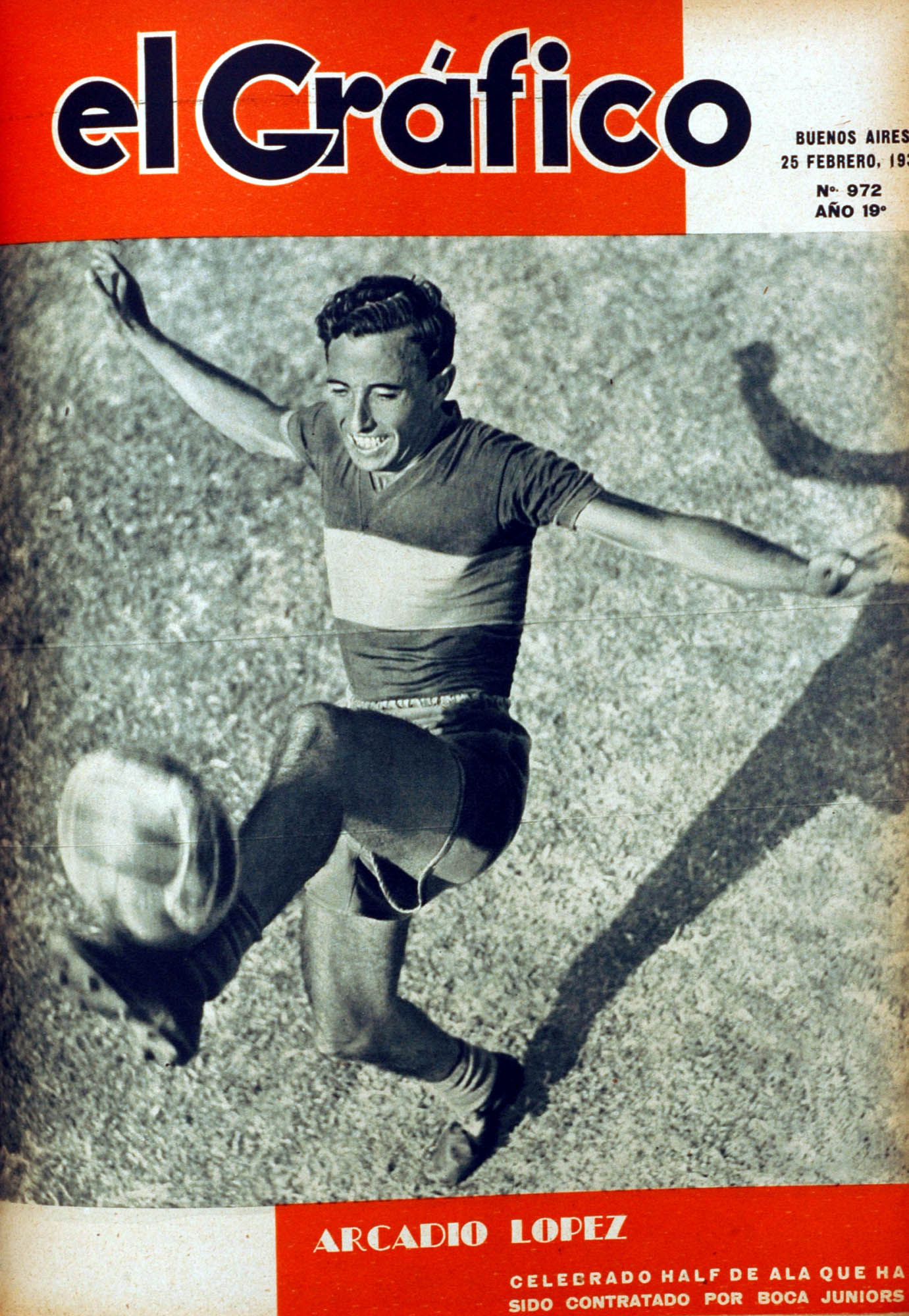

Personal information
- Full name: Arcadio Julio López
- Date of birth: September 15, 1910
- Place of birth: Buenos Aires, Argentina
- Date of death: April 12, 1972
- Place of death: Buenos Aires
- Position: Midfielder

Senior career*
Years	Team	Apps	(Gls)
1931–1934	Lanús	(total) 29	(11)
1934–1935	Sportivo Buenos Aires	1	(1)
1935–1937	Ferro Carril Oeste	65	(1)
1938–1942	Boca Juniors	59	(0)
1942	Lanús	(see above)	

International career
- Argentina

Managerial career
- 1963: Boca Juniors
- * Club domestic league appearances and goals

Arcadio Julio López (September 15, 1910 – April 12, 1972) was an Argentine football defender who played for Argentina in the 1934 FIFA World Cup. He played for many clubs, including Club Atlético Lanús (1931-1934 and 1942), Club Sportivo Buenos Aires (1934–1935), Ferro Carril Oeste (1935–1937) and Boca Juniors (1938–1942). He was coach substitute of the Boca Juniors in 1963, in the match Boca Juniors 1–Universidad de Chile 0 in the Copa Libertadores.

== Fifa World Cup Career ==
National team	Year	Apps	Goals	Assists
Argentina	1934	1	0	0
