= Hans Schwartz =

German footballer

Personal information
- Full name: Hans Schwartz
- Date of birth: 1 March 1913
- Place of birth: Germany
- Date of death: 31 May 1991 (aged 78)
- Place of death: Germany
- Position: Defender

Senior career*
Years	Team	Apps	(Gls)
- Victoria Hamburg

International career
1934	Germany	2	(0)
- * Club domestic league appearances and goals

Hans Schwartz (1 March 1913 – 31 May 1991) was a German football player who participated at the 1934 FIFA World Cup. He played club football with Victoria Hamburg.
