= Gyula Futó =

Hungarian footballer (1908–1977)

Personal information
- Date of birth: 29 December 1908
- Place of birth: Hungary
- Date of death: 2 October 1977 (aged 68)
- Position: Defender

International career
Years	Team	Apps	(Gls)
- Hungary

Gyula Futó (29 December 1908 – 2 October 1977) was a Hungarian footballer who played for Újpest FC, as well as on the Hungary national football team at the 1934 FIFA World Cup. He played 7 matches for the Hungary national team as a defender.
