= Hassan Raghab =

Egyptian footballer (1904-1973)

Personal information
- Date of birth: January 1, 1904
- Place of birth: Egypt
- Date of death: 1973 (aged 68–69)
- Position: Midfielder

Senior career*
Years	Team	Apps	(Gls)
- Union Recreation Ithad

International career
- Egypt
- * Club domestic league appearances and goals

Hassan Raghab (Arabic: حَسَن رَاغِب; January 1, 1904 – 1973) was an Egyptian football midfielder who played for Egypt in the 1934 FIFA World Cup. He also played for Union Recreation Ithad.
