= Johann Urbanek =

Austrian footballer

Personal information
- Date of birth: 10 October 1910
- Place of birth: Austria-Hungary
- Date of death: 7 July 2000 (aged 89)
- Position: Midfielder

Senior career*
Years	Team	Apps	(Gls)
1925–1930	Sportclub Wacker		
1930–1931	Nicholson Vienna		
1931–1947	FK Austria Wien		
1947–1949	Rapid Oberlaa		
1949–1953	Red Star Penzing		

International career
1931–1936	Austria	15	(0)
1941	Germany	1	(0)
- * Club domestic league appearances and goals

Johann Urbanek (10 October 1910 – 7 July 2000) was an Austrian football midfielder who played for Austria in the 1934 FIFA World Cup. He later played one game for Germany during World War II. He also played for FK Austria Wien.
