= Mohammed Hassan (footballer, born 1905) =

Egyptian footballer

Personal information
- Full name: Mohammed Hassan Moussa
- Date of birth: 5 February 1905
- Place of birth: Port Said, Egypt
- Date of death: 16 February 1973 (aged 68)
- Position: Forward

Senior career*
Years	Team	Apps	(Gls)
1930s	Al-Masry		

International career
1930s	Egypt		
- * Club domestic league appearances and goals

Mohammed Hassan Moussa (Arabic: مُحَمَّد حَسَن مُوسَى; 5 February 1905 – 16 February 1973) was an Egyptian footballer who played as a forward. At club level, he played for Al-Masry; he also represented Egypt internationally at the 1934 FIFA World Cup. He was also part of Egypt's squad for the 1928 Summer Olympics, but he did not play in any matches.
