= Paul Zielinski =

German footballer (1911–1966)

Personal information
- Date of birth: 20 November 1911
- Place of birth: Germany
- Date of death: 20 February 1966 (aged 54)
- Place of death: Germany
- Position: Midfielder

Senior career*
| Years | Team | Apps | (Gls) |
| 1930–1939 | SV Union Hamborn | | |
| 1939–1945 | LSV Markersdorf | | |
| 1945–1946 | Rapid Kassel | | |
| 1946–1948 | SV Union Hamborn | | |

International career
| 1934–1936 | Germany | 15 | (0) |

Managerial career
- 1946–1948: SV Union Hamborn
- 1960–1962: 1. FC Bocholt
- * Club domestic league appearances and goals

Paul Zielinski (20 November 1911 – 20 February 1966) was a German football player who participated in the 1934 FIFA World Cup.

== Club career ==
Zielinski played club football with SV Union Hamborn, LSV Markersdorf and Rapid Kassel.

== International career ==
Zielinski won 15 caps for the Germany national team in the mid-1930s.
