= Constant Joacim =

Belgian footballer

Constantinus Joacim

Personal information
- Date of birth: 3 March 1908
- Place of birth: Berchem (Belgium)
- Date of death: 12 June 1979 (aged 71)
- Position: Defender

Youth career
- 1926–1929: Royal Scaldis SC

Senior career*
Years	Team	Apps	(Gls)
1929–1935	R Berchem Sport		
1935–1939	Olympic Charleroi		
1941–1943	Royal Tilleur FC		
1943–1944	KVV Overpelt Fabriek		

International career
1931–1937	Belgium	11	(0)
- * Club domestic league appearances and goals

Constant Joacim (3 March 1908 in Berchem, Belgium – 12 June 1979) was a Belgian footballer.

He was a defender for Royal Berchem Sport, when he was picked for the Belgium team on 16 May 1931 (Belgium-England, 1-4). He played eleven times for the Diables Rouges, until 1937.

At Berchem, he worked with coach Émile Stijnen. The club finished third in the league in 1931, then fifth the year after, but in 1933, they were relegated to the lower division.

Constant Joacim and Émile Stijnen later reunited at Olympic de Charleroi from 1935 to 1939: they took part in the promotion of the Walloon club from Promotion C (Division 4) to the Division d'Honneur (Division 1). This famous team, composed of Flemish players, was nicknamed the "Flaminpic".

During the war, Constant Joacim played for Royal Tilleur FC and then KVV Overpelt Fabriek.

== Honours ==
- Belgian international from 1931 to 1937 (11 caps)
- First international match: 16 May 1931, Belgium-England (1-4)
- Participation in the 1934 World Cup in Italy (played in the match Belgium-Germany (2-5))
- Belgian D2 Champions in 1937 with Olympique Charleroi
