= Sjef van Run =

Dutch footballer

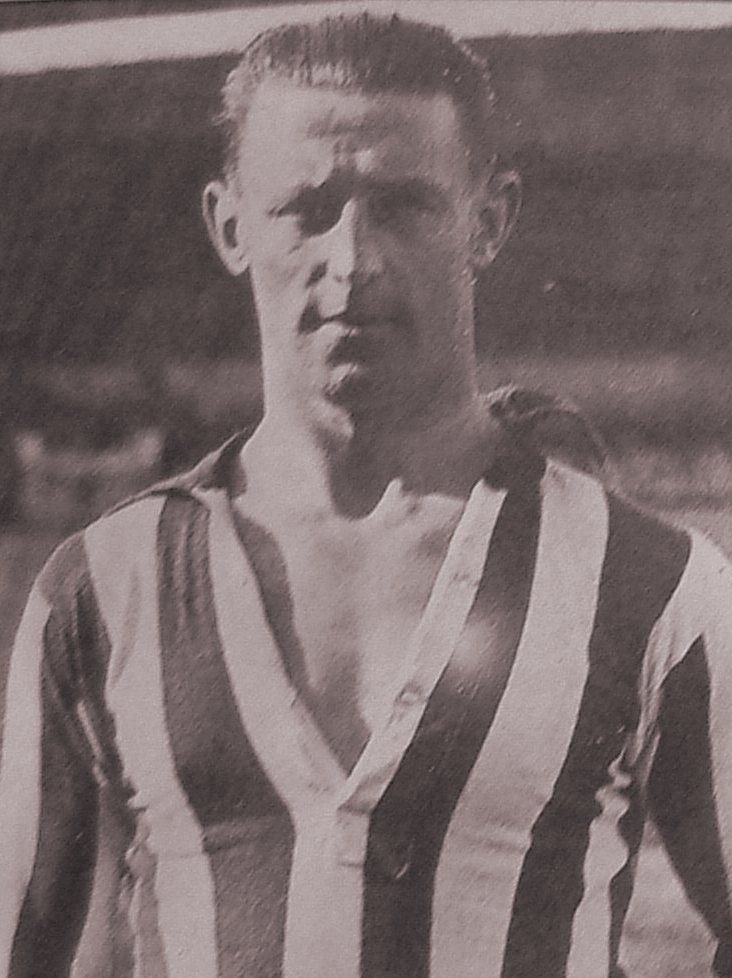

Personal information
- Date of birth: 12 January 1904
- Place of birth: 's-Hertogenbosch, Netherlands
- Date of death: 17 December 1973 (aged 69)
- Place of death: Eindhoven, Netherlands
- Position: Right back

Senior career*
Years	Team	Apps	(Gls)
1926–1942	PSV Eindhoven	359	(0)

International career
1931–1935	Netherlands	25	(0)
- * Club domestic league appearances and goals

Jozephus Johannes Antonius Franciscus "Sjef" van Run (12 January 1904 – 17 December 1973) was a Dutch footballer who played as a defender for the Netherlands in the 1934 FIFA World Cup. He also played for PSV Eindhoven, appearing in 359 league matches between 1926 and 1942. He was part of the Netherlands squad at the 1928 Summer Olympics, but did not play in any matches.
