= Heitor Canalli =

Brazilian footballer (1907-1990)

Personal information
- Full name: Heitor Canalli
- Date of birth: 12 March 1907
- Place of birth: Juiz de Fora, Brazil
- Date of death: 21 July 1990 (aged 83)
- Position: Midfielder

Senior career*
Years	Team	Apps	(Gls)
1927–1929	Petropolitano		
1929–1933	Botafogo		
1933	Flamengo		
1934–1935	Torino		
1935–1940	Botafogo		
1941	Canto do Rio		

International career
- Brazil
- * Club domestic league appearances and goals

Heitor Canalli (12 March 1907 – 21 July 1990) was a Brazilian football player who played for five clubs between 1927 and 1941. He also played for the Brazil national team.
