= 1933–34 Czechoslovak First League =

Czechoslovak First League
- Season: 1933–34
- Champions: Slavia Prague
- Relegated: FK Viktoria Žižkov; SK Náchod
- Top goalscorer: Raymond Braine; Jiří Sobotka (18 goals each)

Statistics of Czechoslovak First League in the 1933–34 season.

== Overview ==
It was contested by 10 teams, and Slavia Prague won the championship. Raymond Braine and Jiří Sobotka were the league's top scorers with 18 goals each.

== League standings ==
Pos	Team	Pld	W	D	L	GF	GA	GR	Pts
1	Slavia Prague (C)	18	14	2	2	63	26	2.423	30
2	Sparta Prague	18	10	5	3	59	32	1.844	25
3	SK Kladno	18	9	3	6	41	35	1.171	21
4	Teplitzer FK	18	6	6	6	33	27	1.222	18
5	FC Bohemians Praha	18	5	7	6	40	48	0.833	17
6	Viktoria Plzeň	18	8	0	10	38	40	0.950	16
7	Čechie Karlín	18	6	4	8	33	57	0.579	16
8	SK Židenice	18	5	4	9	36	45	0.800	14
9	Viktoria Žižkov (R)	18	4	4	10	34	46	0.739	12
10	SK Náchod (R)	18	4	3	11	29	50	0.580	11

Source: rsssf.com
(C) Champions; (R) Relegated

== Results ==
Home \ Away	BOH	KAR	KLA	NÁC	ŽID	SLA	SPA	TEP	PLZ	VŽI
Bohemians Prague		3–3	5–0	4–2	2–2	0–2	2–2	3–2	2–1	0–4
Čechie Karlín	2–2		1–2	2–0	1–4	2–1	2–7	0–4	2–1	3–3
SK Kladno	1–3	3–3		3–1	4–1	4–6	5–1	5–1	2–1	2–2
SK Náchod	1–1	3–1	0–2		2–2	1–6	3–6	0–0	3–0	3–1
SK Židenice	5–1	1–3	1–2	1–3		2–3	1–1	3–2	3–2	2–1
Slavia Prague	6–1	5–2	0–2	5–2	5–2		2–2	5–1	4–1	7–1
Sparta Prague	6–3	10–0	4–2	5–0	3–2	1–2		1–1	5–3	3–2
Teplitzer FK	3–3	5–0	0–0	4–1	3–0	0–0	0–0		3–1	2–0
Viktoria Plzeň	4–3	3–5	2–1	3–2	4–1	0–1	2–0	2–0		5–1
Viktoria Žižkov	2–2	0–1	3–1	4–2	3–3	2–3	0–2	3–2	2–3	

Source: statistiky1ligy.fotbal.cz
Legend: Blue = home team win; Yellow = draw; Red = away team win.
