= Heinrich Müller (footballer, born 1888) =

Swiss footballer and manager (1888-1957)

Personal information
- Full name: Heinrich Müller
- Date of birth: 1888
- Place of birth: Winterthur, Switzerland
- Date of death: May 11, 1957
- Place of death: Montreux, Switzerland
- Position: Defender

Senior career*
Years	Team	Apps	(Gls)
1904-1911	FC Winterthur		
1911-1912	FC Torino	13	(2)
1912-1917	FC Winterthur		

International career
1909–1913	Switzerland	10	(1)

Managerial career
- 1934: Switzerland
- * Club domestic league appearances and goals

Heinrich Müller (1888 - May 11, 1957) was a Swiss football player and manager. He played most of the time for FC Winterthur and was the only member of the team which was part of the team in all three championship titles of the club in the years 1906, 1908 and 1917. He played for 10 matches for Switzerland national team. He managed for Switzerland national team in 1934 FIFA World Cup
