= Franz Cisar =

Austrian footballer (1908–1943)

Personal information
- Date of birth: 28 November 1908
- Place of birth: Austria-Hungary
- Date of death: 10 August 1943 (aged 34)
- Place of death: Soviet Union
- Position: Defender

Senior career*
| Years | Team | Apps | (Gls) |
| 1926–1929 | Hertha Wien | | |
| 1929–1935 | Wiener AC | | |
| 1935–1936 | Moravská Slavia Brno | | |
| 1936–1937 | Metz | 8 | (0) |
| 1937–1938 | Prostějov | | |

International career
| 1933–1934 | Austria | 9 | (1) |
- * Club domestic league appearances and goals

Franz Cisar (28 November 1908 – 10 August 1943)) was an Austrian footballer who played as a defender for Austria in the 1934 FIFA World Cup. His career lasted from 1926 to 1938.

== Club career ==
Cisar played for several Austrian clubs before moving abroad for a season at Metz.

== International career ==
His first cap was against Hungary on 1 October 1933.

He took part in the 1934 FIFA World Cup where he played all of Austria's four games. The third place play-off lost against Germany was his last cap.

== Death ==
In the Second World War Cisar served as 'Obergefreiter' (Corporal) in a German Army tank regiment when he was killed in action on the Eastern Front in Russia on 10 August 1943, aged 34. He had already been wounded in action.
