= Ed Czerkiewicz =

American soccer player (1913–1990)

Personal information
- Full name: Adolph Chester Czerkiewicz
- Date of birth: March 5, 1913
- Place of birth: West Warwick, Rhode Island, U.S.
- Date of death: January 7, 1990 (aged 76)
- Place of death: Warwick, Rhode Island, U.S.
- Height: 5 ft 8 in (1.73 m)
- Position: Right full back

Senior career*
Years	Team	Apps	(Gls)
1933–1935	Pawtucket Rangers		
1935–1936	New York Americans		
1936–1941	Brooklyn St. Mary's Celtic		
1941–	Pawtucket F.C.		

International career
1934	United States	2	(0)
- * Club domestic league appearances and goals

Adolph "Ed" Chester Czerkiewicz (listed in some sources as Czerchiewicz; March 5, 1913 – January 7, 1990) was an American soccer right fullback who spent eight seasons in the American Soccer League and was a member of the United States national team at the 1934 FIFA World Cup.

== Club career ==
In 1933, Czerkiewicz began his club career with the Pawtucket Rangers of the American Soccer League (ASL). Rangers lost the 1934 National Challenge Cup final to Stix, Baer and Fuller F.C., and again in 1935 to St. Louis Central Breweries F.C. After the 1935 loss, Czerchiewicz moved to the New York Americans. After just one season, he moved to Brooklyn St. Mary's Celtic where he again lost a Challenge Cup final. In 1939, Czerkiewicz finally took home the National Challenge Cup when St. Mary's Celtic defeated Chicago Manhattan Beer. Czerkiewicz was drafted into the U.S. Army during World War II. When the war ended, he joined Pawtucket F.C. In 1942, Czerkiewicz lost his fourth Challenge Cup final when Pawtucket fell to Pittsburgh Gallatin.

== National team ==
Czerkiewicz earned two caps with the U.S. national team in 1934. His first game was a 4-2 World Cup qualifier victory over Mexico on May 24, 1934. This win put the U.S. into the 1934 FIFA World Cup. In the game, Czerkiewicz assisted on Aldo Donelli's goal, the first of the game. Czerkiewicz then played in the U.S.’s 7-1 loss to Italy in the first round of the finals.

== Personal life and death ==
Czerkiewicz's first name was Adolph, but he played under the nickname "Ed", which has led some sources to list him as "Ed", "Eddie" or "Edward" His Army induction records show him as Adolph C. Czerkiweicz.

Czerkiewicz died in Warwick, Rhode Island on January 7, 1990, at the age of 76.
