= Edmund Conen =

German footballer (1914–1990)

Personal information
- Date of birth: 10 November 1914
- Place of birth: Ürzig, Germany
- Date of death: 5 March 1990 (aged 75)
- Place of death: Leverkusen, West Germany
- Height: 1.78 m (5 ft 10 in)
- Position: Striker

Youth career
- 1924–1928: SV Ürzig
- 1928–1932: FV 03 Saarbrücken

Senior career*
Years	Team	Apps	(Gls)
1932–1935	FV 03 Saarbrücken		
1938–1944	Stuttgarter Kickers		
1943–1944	→ Mulhouse (guest player)		
1943–1944	→ HSV Groß Born (guest player)		
1945–1950	Stuttgarter Kickers	129	(57)
1950–1952	Young Fellows Zürich		

International career
1934–1942	Germany	28	(27)

Managerial career
- 1950–1952: Young Fellows Zürich (player manager)
- 1952–1956: Eintracht Braunschweig
- 1956–1957: Wuppertaler SV
- 1957–1959: Bayer Leverkusen
- SV Schlebusch
- 1970–1973: BV Opladen
Medal record
Men's football
Representing Germany
FIFA World Cup
Third place	1934 Italy
- * Club domestic league appearances and goals

Edmund Conen (10 November 1914 – 5 March 1990) was a German footballer who played as a striker.

== Career ==
Conen was born in Ürzig, Germany. He played with FV 03 Saarbrücken, Stuttgarter Kickers, Mülhausen 93, HSV Groß Born (Pommern) and a couple of smaller clubs. In 1934, he was approached by Werder Bremen but, instead of joining them, told the DFB that Werder were dishing out financial offers to players. At that time football was still strictly amateur in Germany (officially) and payments to players were not permitted. The affair ended in the club and some of their officials, players and the team manager being fined and suspended.

With four goals in the 1934 FIFA World Cup in Italy, Conen was the joint second top scorer with Angelo Schiavio of Italy, behind Oldřich Nejedlý of Czechoslovakia who had five goals.

He played from 1934 to 1942 in 28 international matches for Germany and scored 27 goals.

Just 19 years old, Germany youngster Conen made quite an impact at the second FIFA World Cup with his three goals in his first match of the tournament against Belgium on 27 May. The game was tied at 2–2 before the powerful forward netted three times in the final 17 minutes to hand the Germans a 5–2 win in Florence, Italy. This achievement could only be equalized by Gerd Müller in 1970 against Peru. He managed to hit the winner when the Germans took the bronze medal with a 3–2 win in the play-off for third place against Austria.

Two years later as a 21-year-old, Conen's career was halted due to illness. This kept him away from football for three and a half years. Conen was courageous and battled through to return to the national team on 25 June 1939. On this date in Copenhagen against Denmark Conen made the perfect comeback, with a goal in the 2–0 victory. During World War II in 1942, he played his last international match. The Germany national team won this final match 5–3 Budapest against Hungary. Conen and Fritz Walter performed well for Sepp Herberger's team.

After end of war Conen worked as a coach, in the middle of the 1950s, with Eintracht Braunschweig in the North and Wuppertaler SV in the West. He later coached Bayer Leverkusen and later other teams from the city of Leverkusen like SV Schlebusch and BV Opladen. Conen died in the spring of 1990 in Leverkusen, only months before West Germany were to win their third World Cup championship.

== Career statistics ==
=== Club ===
Appearances and goals by club, season and competition
Club	Season	League		
Club	Season	Division	Apps	Goals
Stuttgarter Kickers	1945–46	Oberliga	16	8
Stuttgarter Kickers	1946–47	Oberliga	29	20
Stuttgarter Kickers	1947–48	Oberliga	35	18
Stuttgarter Kickers	1948–49	Oberliga	21	7
Stuttgarter Kickers	1949–50	Oberliga	24	4
Total			125	57

=== International ===
Appearances and goals by national team and year
National team	Year	Apps	Goals
Germany	1934	5	5
Germany	1935	9	9
Germany	1936	0	0
Germany	1937	0	0
Germany	1938	0	0
Germany	1939	4	3
Germany	1940	5	8
Germany	1941	2	2
Germany	1942	3	0
Total		28	27
