= Julius Hjulian =

Swedish-American soccer player

Personal information
- Full name: Julius Hjulian
- Date of birth: March 15, 1903
- Place of birth: Eskilstuna, Sweden
- Date of death: February 1, 1974 (aged 70)
- Place of death: Palos Heights, Illinois, U.S.
- Height: 5 ft 9 in (1.75 m)
- Position: Goalkeeper

Senior career*
Years	Team	Apps	(Gls)
1921	IFK Eskilstuna		
- Pullman Cars
- Harvey FC
1925–1926	Celtic		
- Chicago Sparta
- Chicago Wonderbolts

International career
1934	United States	2	(0)

Managerial career
- –: IFK Eskilstuna
- * Club domestic league appearances and goals

Julius Hjulian (March 15, 1903 – February 1, 1974) was a soccer player who played as a goalkeeper. Born in Sweden, he represented the United States national team and played for them at the 1934 FIFA World Cup.

== Career ==
Hjulian started his career playing in Sweden, and became Swedish champion 1921 with IFK Eskilstuna. His name was then Julius Hjulin. Hjulin emigrated in 1922 to the United States together with his brother and settled in Chicago. Hjulian returned to Europe and in 1925–26 he played with Celtic F.C. but did not make any league appearances.

Hjulian spent his career in Chicago. In 1930, he is listed as playing with Chicago Sparta. At the time, Sparta dominated the National Soccer League of Chicago and consistently won the Peel Cup. In 1934, he was playing for the Chicago Wieboldt (Wonderbolts) when they broke Sparta's hold on the Peel Cup. That year, he was selected as the starting goalkeeper for the U.S. national team at the 1934 FIFA World Cup. Hjulian gained his first cap when the U.S. defeated Mexico, 4–2, in a World Cup qualifier. The U.S. then lost to Italy in the first round of the World Cup by 7–1.
