= Alberto Galateo =

Argentine footballer

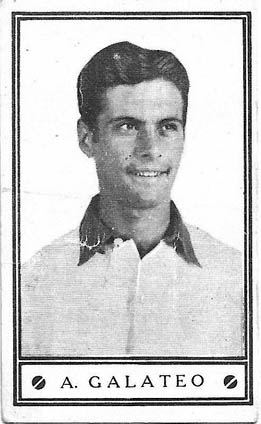
- Galateo depicted on a football card in 1934

Personal information
- Full name: Alberto Luis Galateo
- Date of birth: 4 May 1912
- Place of birth: Argentina
- Date of death: 26 February 1961 (aged 48)
- Place of death: Sáenz Peña, Buenos Aires, Argentina
- Height: 1.79 m (5 ft 10 in)
- Position: Forward

Youth career
- San Lorenzo de Santa Fe

Senior career*
Years	Team	Apps	(Gls)
1929	Colón		
1930–1934	Unión de Santa Fe		
1935–1937	Huracán	32	(9)
1938	Chacarita Juniors	22	(5)
1939	Racing Club	1	(0)
1940–1942	Sportivo Candioti		
1943	Colegiales	12	(1)

International career
1934	Argentina	1	(1)
- * Club domestic league appearances and goals

Alberto Luis Galateo (May 4, 1912 – February 26, 1961) was an Argentine football forward who played for Argentina in the 1934 FIFA World Cup. He also played for Unión de Santa Fe.

Galateo played professionally for Club Atlético Huracán, Chacarita Juniors and Racing Club de Avellaneda from 1935 to 1939.

== Death ==
In February 1961, Galateo was killed by his son David José, in a family dispute. He wanted to kill his wife, so his son came in her defense, shooting him dead. His grandson, Damián, produced a film (Terror Familiar) about these events.

== Fifa World Cup Career ==
National team	Year	Apps	Goals	Assists
Argentina	1934	1	1	0

=== International goals ===
Argentina's goal tally first

#	Date	Venue	Opponent	Score	Result	Competition
1.	27 May 1934	Stadio Littorale, Bologna, Italy	Sweden	2–1	2–3	1934 FIFA World Cup
