= Ernesto Belis =

Argentine footballer

Personal information
- Full name: Ernesto Antonio Belis
- Date of birth: 1 February 1909
- Place of birth: Argentina
- Date of death: Unknown
- Position: Defender

Senior career*
Years	Team	Apps	(Gls)
1927–1930	Excursionistas		
1931–1932	Platense	14	(2)
1934–1938	Defensores de Belgrano	(total) 53	(9)
1939–1940	Excursionistas	42	(2)
1944	Defensores de Belgrano	(see above)	

International career
1934	Argentina	1	(1)
- * Club domestic league appearances and goals

Ernesto Antonio Belis (1 February 1909 – ?) was an Argentine football defender who played for Argentina in the 1934 FIFA World Cup. He also played for Defensores de Belgrano. Belis is deceased.

== Fifa World Cup career ==
National team	Year	Apps	Goals	Assists
Argentina	1934	1	1	0

=== International goals ===
Argentina's goal tally first

#	Date	Venue	Opponent	Score	Result	Competition
1.	27 May 1934	Stadio Littorale, Bologna, Italy	Sweden	1–0	2–3	1934 FIFA World Cup

Sporting positions
Preceded by Lucien Laurent	FIFA World Cup opening goal 1934	Succeeded by Josef Gauchel
