= Frans Peeraer =

Belgian footballer

- Peeraer with Antwerp

Personal information
- Full name: Franciscus Albertus Arthur Peeraer
- Date of birth: 15 February 1913
- Place of birth: Borgerhout, Belgium
- Date of death: 28 March 1988 (aged 75)

Senior career*
Years	Team	Apps	(Gls)
1931–1937	Royal Antwerp FC	90	(6)
1937–1944	KFC Rhodienne-Verrewinkel		
Total		90	(6)

International career
1934	Belgium	3	(0)
- * Club domestic league appearances and goals

Franciscus Albertus Arthur Peeraer (15 February 1913 – 28 March 1988) was a Belgian footballer.

== Biography ==
Playing as a midfielder at Royal Antwerp FC in the 1930s, he won three caps for Belgium in 1934. He played one match during the World Cup of the same year.
