= Frank Wels =

Dutch footballer

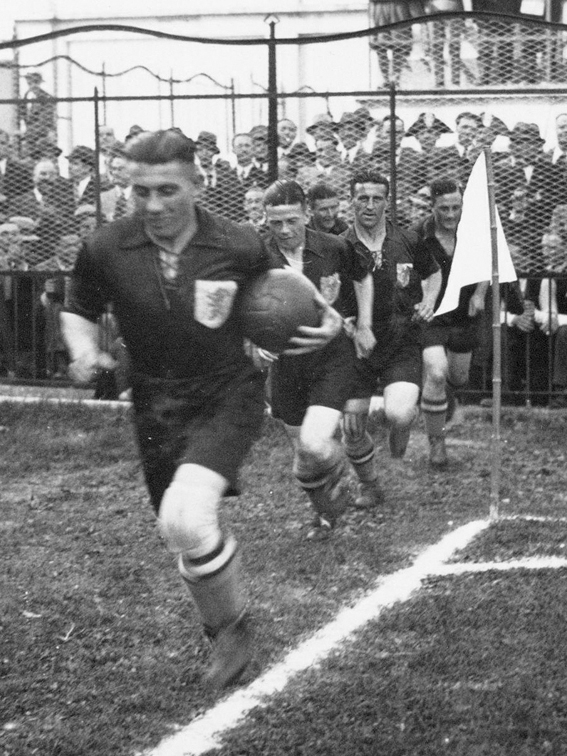

Personal information
- Date of birth: 21 February 1909
- Place of birth: Ede, Netherlands
- Date of death: 16 February 1982 (aged 72)
- Position: Forward

Senior career*
Years	Team	Apps	(Gls)
- Unitas Gorinchem
- Feijenoord
- Unitas Gorinchem

International career
1931–1938	Netherlands	36	(5)
- * Club domestic league appearances and goals

Frank Wels (21 February 1909 – 16 February 1982) was a Dutch football forward who played for Netherlands in the 1934 and 1938 FIFA World Cups. He also played for the amateur team of GVV Unitas in Gorinchem.
