= Francisco Rúa =

Argentine footballer

Personal information
- Full name: Francisco Rúa
- Date of birth: 4 February 1911
- Place of birth: Argentina
- Date of death: 5 August 1993
- Position: Forward

Senior career*
Years	Team	Apps	(Gls)
1932	Talleres (RE)	4	(0)
1933	Lanús	1	(0)
1934	Dock Sud		
1938	Vélez Sarsfield	4	(1)
1939	Newell's Old Boys	10	(6)
1940	CA Estudiantes	16	(3)
1946-1947	Temperley	8	(0)

International career
- Argentina
- * Club domestic league appearances and goals

Francisco Rúa (born in Buenos Aires, Argentina, 4 February 1911, died on 5 August 1993) was an Argentine football forward who played for Argentina in the 1934 FIFA World Cup. He also played for Talleres de Remedios de Escalada, Lanús, Dock Sud, Vélez Sarsfield, Newell's Old Boys, Estudiantes (BA) and Temperley.
