= Henk Pellikaan =

Dutch footballer (1910–1999)

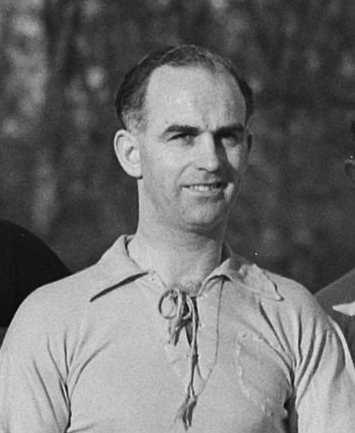

Personal information
- Date of birth: 10 October 1910
- Place of birth: Leerdam, Netherlands
- Date of death: 24 July 1999 (aged 88)
- Place of death: Tilburg, Netherlands
- Position: Midfielder

Senior career*
Years	Team	Apps	(Gls)
- Longa Tilburg

International career
1932–1946	Netherlands	13	(0)
- * Club domestic league appearances and goals

Hendricus Adriaan Henk Pellikaan (10 November 1910 – 24 July 1999) was a Dutch football midfielder who played for Netherlands in the 1934 FIFA World Cup. He also played for Longa Tilburg.
