= Federico Wilde =

Argentine footballer (1909–?)

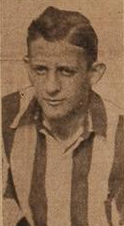

Personal information
- Date of birth: 1909
- Place of birth: Argentina
- Position: Forward

Senior career*
| Years | Team | Apps | (Gls) |
| 1924–1928 | San Martín de Santa Fe | | |
| 1928–1939 | Unión de Santa Fe | | |
| 1939 | Sportivo Buenos Aires | 1 | (0) |

International career
- Argentina
- * Club domestic league appearances and goals

Federico Wilde (born 1909, date of death unknown) was an Argentine football forward who played for Argentina in the 1934 FIFA World Cup. He also played for Unión de Santa Fe. Wilde is deceased.
