= Štefan Čambal =

Slovak footballer and manager

Personal information
- Date of birth: 16 December 1908
- Place of birth: Pozsony, Austria-Hungary (today's Bratislava, Slovakia)
- Date of death: 18 July 1990 (aged 81)
- Place of death: Prague, Czechoslovakia
- Height: 1.76 m (5 ft 9 1/2 in)
- Position: Midfielder

Youth career
- 1921–1923: SK Donaustadt
- 1923–1927: Ligeti SC

Senior career*
Years	Team	Apps	(Gls)
1927–1929	1. ČsŠK Bratislava		
1929–1930	Teplitzer FK		
1931–1936	Slavia Prague		
1937–1938	SK Baťa Zlín		
1938–1939	SK Židenice		

International career
1932–1935	Czechoslovakia	22	(0)

Managerial career
- 1939–1945: Slovakia
- 1945–1946: SK Baťa Zlín
- 1949: Czechoslovakia
- 1949–1952: Vítkovické železárny
- 1955: Jiskra Liberec
- 1957–1958: Dukla Pardubice
- 1959–1962: Vorwärts Berlin
- 1964–1966: FC Prague Sydney
- 1966–1968: Lokomotíva Košice
- 1975–1976: Sparta Prague
Medal record
Representing Czechoslovakia
Men's Football
FIFA World Cup
Runner-up	1934 Italy
- * Club domestic league appearances and goals

Štefan Čambal (17 December 1908 – 18 July 1990) was a Slovak football player and later a football manager. He played for Czechoslovakia, for which he played 22 matches. He was born in Pozsony and died in Prague.

He was a participant in the 1934 FIFA World Cup, where Czechoslovakia won the silver medal. At the tournament, Čambal became the first player of Slovak origin at a World Cup. In his country he started his career with 1. ČsŠK Bratislava, winning the 1927 amateur title in Czechoslovakia. He went on to play for clubs such as Teplitzer FK, SK Slavia Prague, SK Židenice and Baťa Zlín.

He was later a well-known football manager, coaching, amongst others, the Czechoslovakia national football team.

== Honours ==
=== Player ===
Slovan Bratislava

- Slovak League: 1927

Slavia Prague

- Czechoslovak First League: 1930–31, 1932–33, 1933–34, 1934–35

=== Manager ===
Sparta Prague

- Czechoslovak Second League: promotion 1975–76

Vorwärts Berlin

- DDR-Oberliga: 1962
