= Amadeo García =

Spanish football manager

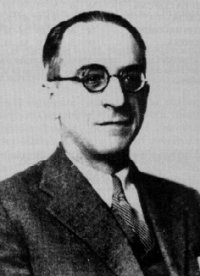

Personal information
- Full name: Amadeo García de Salazar y Luco
- Date of birth: 31 March 1887
- Place of birth: Vitoria, Kingdom of Spain
- Date of death: 18 June 1947 (aged 60)

Managerial career
- Years: Team
- 1934–1936: Spain

Amadeo García de Salazar y Luco (31 March 1887 – 18 June 1947) was a Spanish football manager. He was the manager of the Spain national football team from 1934 to 1936, and coached the team during the 1934 FIFA World Cup.
