= Willy Busch =

German footballer

Personal information
- Full name: Wilhelm Busch
- Date of birth: 4 January 1907
- Place of birth: Duisburg, German Empire
- Date of death: 4 March 1982 (aged 75)
- Position: Defender

Senior career*
Years	Team	Apps	(Gls)
1927–1948	TuS Duisburg		

International career
1933–1936	Germany	13	(0)
Medal record
Men's football
Representing Germany
FIFA World Cup
Third place	1934 Italy
- * Club domestic league appearances and goals

Wilhelm "Willy" Busch (4 January 1907 – 4 March 1982) was a German international footballer.

== Club career ==
He was a player of TuS Duisburg. From 1940 to 1943 he played with Toni Turek, the 1954 World Champion. And in the 1943–44 season he played in the final round of the German championship.

== International career ==
Busch won 13 cap for the Germany national football team, and took part in the 1934 FIFA World Cup.
