= László Sternberg =

Hungarian footballer

Personal information
- Date of birth: 28 May 1905
- Place of birth: Austria-Hungary
- Date of death: 1982
- Position: Defender

Senior career*
Years	Team	Apps	(Gls)
1925–1926	Novese Novi Ligure		
1926–1927	Andrea Doria		
1927–1928	Újpest		
1928–1929	New York Giants	7	(0)
1929–1930	Brooklyn Hakoah	32	(3)
1930–1931	Hakoah All-Stars	59	(0)
1932	New York Americans		
1932–1936	Újpest		
1936–1937	Red Star Paris		

International career
1928–1936	Hungary	19	(0)

Managerial career
- 1937–1938: Újpest
- * Club domestic league appearances and goals

László Sternberg (28 May 1905 – 4 July 1982) was a Hungarian footballer who played professionally in both Europe and the United States. A defender, he captained the Hungary national football team at the 1934 FIFA World Cup.

In 1925, Sternberg began his career with Novese Novi Ligure. After one season, he moved to Andrea Doria In 1927, a new law in Italy banned the use of foreign players on Italian teams. Sternberg returned to Hungary and joined Újpest FC. In 1928, Sternberg moved to the United States and signed with the New York Giants of the American Soccer League. With the outbreak of the "Soccer Wars" between the ASL and the United States Football Federation, Sternberg briefly played in the Eastern Professional Soccer League. In 1929, he moved to Brooklyn Hakoah, a predominantly Jewish team. In 1930, Brooklyn merged with New York Hakoah to form the Hakoah All-Stars. Brooklyn Hakoah won the 1929 National Challenge Cup. In 1932, he briefly played for the New York Americans. He then he returned to Europe and joined Újpest FC before finishing his career with Red Star Paris. He gained nineteen caps as a defender for Hungary.

He went on to coach Újpest FC from 1937 to 1938.
