= Imre Markos =

Hungarian footballer and coach

Personal information
- Date of birth: 9 June 1908
- Place of birth: Austria-Hungary
- Date of death: 27 September 1960 (aged 52)
- Position: Forward

Senior career*
Years	Team	Apps	(Gls)
–1936	Bocskai FC	?	(?)
1936–1937	Stade Rennais	?	(?)
Total		?	(?)

International career
1929–1935	Hungary	20	(5)

Managerial career
- CS Târgu Mureș
- 1947–1948: Debrecen
- 1948–1950: TPS Turku
- 1951–1953: Degerfors
- 1954: Pyrkivä Turku
- 1955: Fenerbahçe
- IFK Kristianstad
- * Club domestic league appearances and goals

Imre Markos (9 June 1908 – 27 September 1960) was a Hungarian football player and coach.

== Career ==
=== Playing career ===
Markos, who played as a forward, spent his professional career in both Hungary and France, playing for Bocskai FC and Stade Rennais.

Markos also represented Hungary at international level, scoring five goals in twenty games between 1929 and 1935.

=== Coaching career ===
Markos managed CS Târgu Mureș, Debreceni VSC, TPS Turku, Degerfors IF, Pyrkivä Turku, Fenerbahçe and IFK Kristianstad.
