= Rudolf Krčil =

Czech footballer and manager

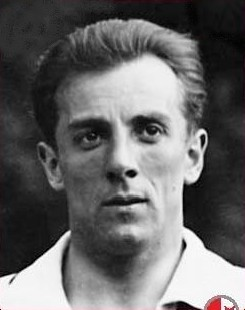

Personal information
- Date of birth: 5 March 1906
- Place of birth: Trnovany, Austria-Hungary
- Date of death: 3 April 1981 (aged 75)
- Place of death: Czechoslovakia
- Height: 1.70 m (5 ft 7 in)
- Position: Midfielder

Youth career
- 1919–1926: Teplitzer FK

Senior career*
| Years | Team | Apps | (Gls) |
| 1927–1933 | Teplitzer FK | | |
| 1933–1937 | Slavia Prague | | |
| 1937–1939 | Floriana | | |
| 1939–1943 | NSTG Teplitz | | |
| 1942 | → FC St. Pauli (loan) | | |

International career
| 1929–1935 | Czechoslovakia | 20 | (0) |

Managerial career
- 1947–1948: SK Teplice
- 1949: Czechoslovakia B
- 1952–1962: Ingstav Teplice
- 1962: Spartak Brno ZJŠ
- 1963: Spartak Plzeň
- 1969–1970: ASV Bergedorf 85
Medal record
Representing Czechoslovakia
Men's Football
FIFA World Cup
| Runner-up | 1934 Italy |
- * Club domestic league appearances and goals

Rudolf Krčil (5 March 1906 – 3 April 1981) was a Czech football player and later manager. He played as a midfielder for several clubs, including Teplitzer FK and Slavia Prague. He made 20 appearances for the Czechoslovakia national team and was a participant at the 1934 FIFA World Cup, where he played all four matches. Krčil later worked as a football manager, coaching among others FK Teplice and Rudá hvězda Brno.
