= József Vágó =

Hungarian footballer

Personal information
- Full name: József Vágó
- Date of birth: 30 June 1906
- Place of birth: Debrecen, Hungary
- Date of death: 26 August 1945 (age 39)
- Place of death: Hungary
- Position: Defender

Senior career*
Years	Team	Apps	(Gls)
- Debreceni VSC

International career
1934–1937	Hungary	13	(0)
- * Club domestic league appearances and goals

József Vágó (30 June 1906 – 26 August 1945) was a Hungarian football defender who played for Hungary in the 1934 FIFA World Cup. He also played for Debreceni VSC.
