= Karel Petrů =

Czech football manager (1891–1949)

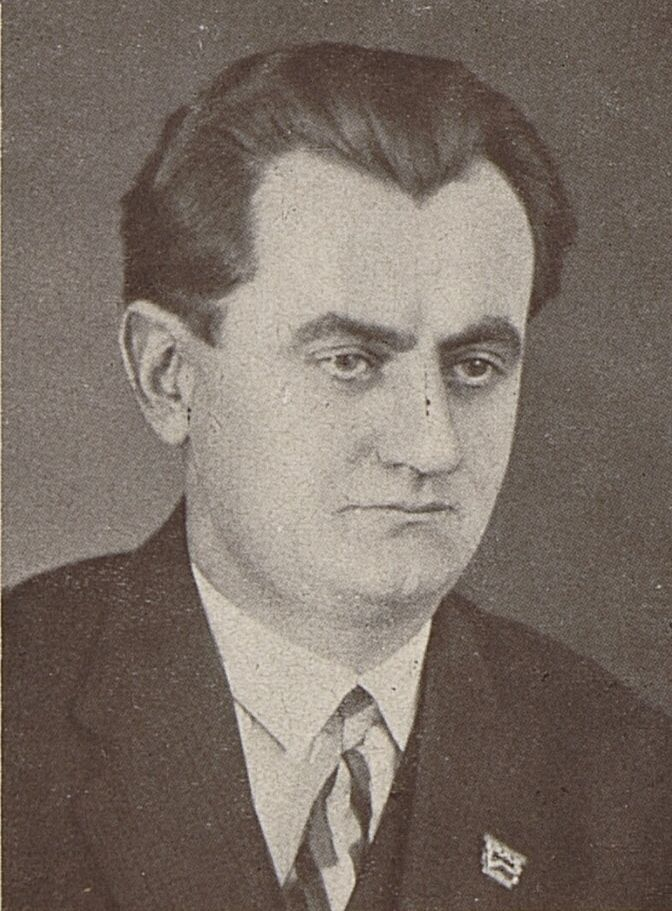

Personal information
- Full name: Karel Petrů
- Date of birth: 24 January 1891
- Place of birth: Březové Hory, Bohemia, Austria-Hungary
- Date of death: 1949

Managerial career
- Years: Team
- Czechoslovakia

Karel Petrů (24 January 1891 in Březové Hory – 1949) was the coach of the Czechoslovakia national football team when they finished second in the 1934 FIFA World Cup.
