= Josef Čtyřoký =

Czech footballer (1906–1985)

Personal information
- Date of birth: 30 September 1906
- Place of birth: Smíchov, Austria-Hungary
- Date of death: 11 January 1985 (aged 78)
- Place of death: Czechoslovakia
- Position: Defender

Youth career
- Slavia Prague

Senior career*
Years	Team	Apps	(Gls)
1925–1928	Slavia Prague		
1928–1930	SK Kladno		
1930–1939	Sparta Prague		

International career
1931–1938	Czechoslovakia	42	(0)
Medal record
Representing Czechoslovakia
Men's Football
FIFA World Cup
Runner-up	1934 Italy
- * Club domestic league appearances and goals

Josef Čtyřoký (30 September 1906 in Smíchov — 11 January 1985) was a Czech football player.

Čtyřoký played for SK Slavia Praha (until 1928), SK Kladno (1928–1930) and AC Sparta Prague (1930–1939).

He played for Czechoslovakia national team (42 matches), and was a participant at the 1934 FIFA World Cup, where he played all four matches.
