= Constantino Urbieta Sosa =

Paraguayan-Argentine footballer (1907-1983)

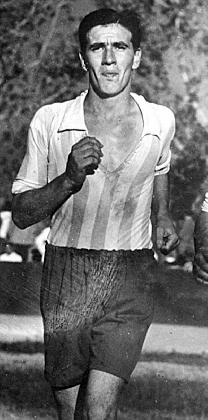

Personal information
- Full name: Constantino Urbieta Sosa
- Date of birth: 12 August 1907
- Place of birth: Asunción, Paraguay
- Date of death: 12 December 1983 (aged 76)
- Place of death: Avellaneda, Argentina
- Position: Midfielder

Senior career*
Years	Team	Apps	(Gls)
1931	Club Nacional		
1932	Tigre	21	(1)
1934	Godoy Cruz		
1935	San Lorenzo	3	(0)
1939	CA Estudiantes	6	(0)

International career
1931	Paraguay	2	(0)
1934	Argentina	1	(0)
- * Club domestic league appearances and goals

Constantino Urbieta Sosa (12 August 1907 – 12 December 1983) was a Paraguayan-Argentine footballer that played as a midfielder.

Born in Asunción, Urbieta started his career in Club Nacional before playing for Argentine clubs C.A. Tigre, Godoy Cruz Antonio Tomba, San Lorenzo de Almagro and C.A. Estudiantes.

Urbieta Sosa was part of the Paraguay national football team in 1931 and also played for the Argentina national team that participated in the 1934 FIFA World Cup, being the second foreign-born player to play for Argentina a FIFA World Cup.
