= José Nehin =

Argentine footballer

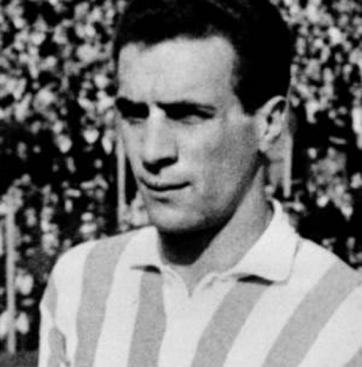

Personal information
- Full name: José Eduardo Nehin
- Date of birth: October 13, 1905
- Place of birth: San Juan, Argentina
- Date of death: December 16, 1957 (aged 52)
- Position: Midfielder

Senior career*
Years	Team	Apps	(Gls)
1928–1934	Sportivo Desamparados		
1935–1937	Estudiantes de La Plata	25	(6)

International career
- Argentina
- * Club domestic league appearances and goals

José Eduardo Nehin (born in San Juan, Argentina, October 13, 1905, death on December 16, 1957) was an Argentine footballer who played as a midfielder for Argentina in the 1934 FIFA World Cup. He also played for Sportivo Desamparados.

Nehin's father was one of the founders of Sportivo Desamparados, and he would begin his amateur football career with the club. Nehin helped the club win its first title, the Liga Sanjuanina de fútbol in 1928. His performances for Desamparados led to Nehin's selection to the national team that competed at the 1934 FIFA World Cup finals, where he would captain the side.

Nehin made his living as a cooper.

== Fifa World Cup Career ==
National team	Year	Apps	Goals	Assists
Argentina	1934	1	0	0
