= Raimundo Orsi =

Italian footballer (1901–1986)

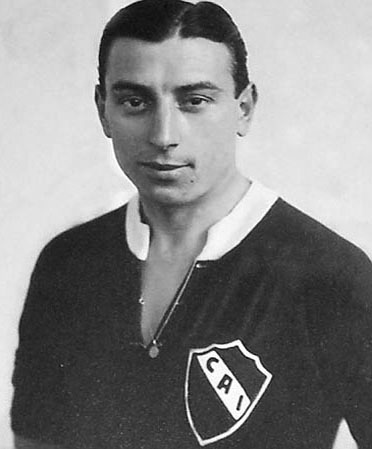
- Orsi in 1920 with Independiente

Personal information
- Full name: Raimundo Bibiani Orsi
- Date of birth: 2 December 1901
- Place of birth: Avellaneda, Argentina
- Date of death: 6 April 1986 (aged 84)
- Place of death: Santiago, Chile
- Height: 1.69 m (5 ft 7 in)
- Positions: Winger; forward

Senior career*
Years	Team	Apps	(Gls)
1920–1928	Independiente	249	(110)
1928–1935	Juventus	194	(88)
1935–1936	Independiente	21	(6)
1936	Boca Juniors	11	(0)
1937	Platense	27	(10)
1938	Almagro	23	(13)
1939–1940	Flamengo	13	(2)
1940–1942	Peñarol	0	(0)
1942–1943	Santiago National	9	(3)

International career
1924–1928	Argentina	12	(3)
1929–1935	Italy	35	(13)
1936–1939	Argentina	11	(3)

Managerial career
- 1973: Huracán SR
Medal record
Men's football
Representing Argentina
Copa América
Winner	1927 Peru
Olympic Games
Silver medal – second place	1928 Amsterdam
Representing Italy
FIFA World Cup
Winner	1934 Italy
Central European International Cup
Winner	1927–30 Europe
Winner	1933–35 Europe
Runner-up	1931–32 Europe
- * Club domestic league appearances and goals

Raimundo Bibiani "Mumo" Orsi (2 December 1901 – 6 April 1986) was an Italian Argentine footballer who played as a winger or as a forward. At the international level, he represented both Argentina and Italy, winning the 1927 Copa América and the silver medal at the 1928 Summer Olympics in Amsterdam, Netherlands, with Argentina, as well as two editions of the Central European International Cup and the 1934 FIFA World Cup, with Italy.

== Club career ==
His career began in Argentina with Club Atlético Independiente (1920–1928; 1935), but it was with Juventus that Orsi would have the most success in his club career. He joined the club in time for the 1928–29 season and would stay at Juventus until 1935, winning five consecutive league titles between 1931 and 1935. After leaving Italy, Orsi played the rest of his career in South America. He returned to Independiente before moving on to Boca Juniors (1936), Club Atlético Platense (1937–38), and Almagro (1939–40); he also played for Flamengo in Brazil (1939; 1940), Peñarol in Uruguay (1941–42), and Santiago National in Chile (1943).

== International career ==
His international debut for Argentina on August 10, 1924, was against Uruguay. Over the next 12 years, he played 13 times for Argentina and scored 3 goals, winning the 1927 Copa América and the silver medal at the 1928 Summer Olympics in Amsterdam, Netherlands. Orsi's career is strange by modern standards, however, in that he played for Italy as well as Argentina, allowing him to gain 35 caps and score 13 goals for his second country between December 1, 1929, and March 24, 1935. This also allowed him to win two editions of the Central European International Cup, and to be a part of the side that won the 1934 FIFA World Cup, in the final of which he scored. He died in 1986 aged 84.

== Style of play ==
Considered one of the greatest players of his time, and one of the best ever Italian players in his position, Orsi was a quick left-footed winger, who usually played on the left flank, due to his crossing ability. A prolific goalscorer, he was an accurate finisher, both with his head and his feet, and he excelled in the air and acrobatically; because of this he was also capable of playing as a striker, and on the right flank, a position in which he was able to make diagonal attacking runs or cut into the centre to shoot with his stronger foot. Nicknamed "Mumo", despite his lack of shooting power and physical strength, he was an extremely quick player, with excellent technical ability, who was renowned for his dribbling skills and his use of feints to beat opponents. He was also an accurate penalty kick taker.

== Honours ==
=== Club ===
Independiente

- Argentine Primera División: 1922, 1926
- Copa de Competencia: 1924, 1925, 1926

Juventus

- Serie A: 1930–31, 1931–32, 1932–33, 1933–34, 1934–35

Flamengo

- Rio State Championship: 1939

=== International ===
Argentina

- South American Football Championship: 1927
- Summer Olympics Silver Medal: 1928

Italy

- World Cup: 1934
- Central European International Cup: 1927–30, 1933–35; Runner-up: 1931–32

=== Individual ===
- FIFA World Cup Team of the Tournament: 1934
