= Oldřich Nejedlý =

Czech footballer (1909–1990)

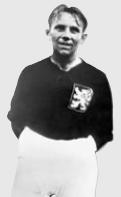
- Nejedlý in 1934

Personal information
- Full name: Oldřich Nejedlý
- Date of birth: 26 December 1909
- Place of birth: Žebrák, Austria-Hungary
- Date of death: 11 June 1990 (aged 80)
- Place of death: Rakovník, Czechoslovakia
- Height: 1.74 m (5 ft 9 in)
- Position: Inside left

Youth career
- 1920–1924: Spartak Žebrák

Senior career*
Years	Team	Apps	(Gls)
1924–1925	Čechoslovan Košíře		
1925–1926	Spartak Žebrák		
1926–1931	SK Rakovník		
1931–1941	Sparta Prague	187	(162)
1941–1950	SK Rakovník	38	(18)
1950–1956	Spartak Žebrák		
Total		225	(180)

International career
1931–1939	Czechoslovakia	44	(29)
Medal record
Representing Czechoslovakia
Men's Football
FIFA World Cup
Runner-up	1934 Italy
- * Club domestic league appearances and goals

Oldřich Nejedlý (26 December 1909 – 11 June 1990) was a Czech footballer. He spent his entire professional career at Sparta Prague as an inside-forward. Nejedlý was the top goalscorer of the 1934 FIFA World Cup at international level. He died in 1990 at the age of 80 during the FIFA World Cup of said year, a tournament which took place in Italy after the 1934 edition.

== Club career ==
Nejedlý played for Sparta Prague during his entire professional span. He scored 162 league goals in 187 games, winning four Czechoslovak First League championships in 1932, 1936, 1938 and 1939, adding a Mitropa Cup in 1935. He also scored 18 goals in 38 games for SK Rakovník (1943, 1944 and 1946), giving him a total of 180 league goals in 225 games. At the end of his career, Nejedlý returned to his hometown club of Zebrak before retiring from professional football at the age of almost 47 another leg injury.

== International career ==
For Czechoslovakia, Nejedlý scored 29 goals in 44 games. He was awarded the Bronze Ball in the 1934 World Cup as the third most outstanding player of the tournament and voted into the All-Star Team of the tournament.

Nejedlý participated in 1934 and 1938 FIFA World Cups, respectively in Italy and France. He was the outright top scorer in the former tournament with five goals, which has been officially recognized by FIFA since November 2006, as he was initially credited with only four, making him joint top scorer with Angelo Schiavio and Edmund Conen. Nejedlý also scored two goals in the latter tournament until a leg injury effectively ended his International career afterwards.

== Career statistics ==
=== International ===
Czechoslovakia
Year	Apps	Goals
1931	1	1
1932	6	3
1933	5	1
1934	9	9
1935	4	2
1936	4	1
1937	6	5
1938	8	6
1939	1	1
Total	44	29

== See also ==
- List of FIFA World Cup top goalscorers

Preceded by Guillermo Stábile	FIFA World Cup Golden Shoe; 1934	Succeeded by Leônidas
