= Ladislav Ženíšek =

Czech footballer and manager (1904–1985)

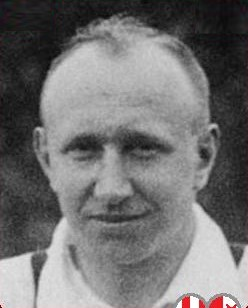

Personal information
- Date of birth: 7 March 1904
- Place of birth: Vinohrady, Austria-Hungary
- Date of death: 14 May 1985 (aged 81)
- Position: Defender

Youth career
- ČAFC Vinohrady
- SK Červený Kostelec
- SK Pardubice
- Teplitzer FK

Senior career*
| Years | Team | Apps | (Gls) |
| 1924–1927 | Viktoria Žižkov | | |
| 1927–1929 | Sparta Chicago | | |
| 1929 | Viktoria Žižkov | | |
| 1929–36 | Slavia Prague | | |
| 1937–1938 | Viktoria Žižkov | | |

International career
| 1926–1935 | Czechoslovakia | 22 | (0) |

Managerial career
- 1940–1944: Bohemians Prague
- 1945–1947: Viktoria Žižkov
- 1947–1948: Vítkovicke železárny
- 1949–1951: ATK Prag
- 1950–1951: Czechoslovakia
Medal record
Representing Czechoslovakia
Men's Football
FIFA World Cup
| Runner-up | 1934 Italy |
- * Club domestic league appearances and goals

Ladislav Ženíšek (7 March 1904 in Vinohrady – 14 May 1985) was a Czech football defender and later a football manager. He played 22 matches for Czechoslovakia.

He was a participant in the 1934 FIFA World Cup, where Czechoslovakia won the silver medal.

In his country he played mostly for Viktoria Žižkov and Slavia Prague.

As a football manager he coached several teams, including Viktoria Žižkov, as well as the Czechoslovak national team.
