= 1934 FIFA World Cup squads =

The 1934 FIFA World Cup was an international football tournament that was held in Italy from 27 May to 10 June 1934. Below are the squads the 16 national teams registered in the tournament.

Brazil and Czechoslovakia were the only teams that had players from foreign clubs.

Rosters include reserves, alternates, and pre-selected players who may have participated in qualifiers and/or pre-tournament friendlies but not in the finals themselves.

== Argentina ==
Head coach: (Italy) Felipe Pascucci

No.	Pos.	Player	Date of birth (age)	Caps	Club
	MF	Ernesto Albarracín	25 September 1907 (aged 26)	0	(Argentina) Sportivo Buenos Aires
	DF	Ramón Astudillo		0	(Argentina) Colón de Santa Fe
	DF	Ernesto Belis	1 February 1909 (aged 25)	0	(Argentina) Defensores de Belgrano
	DF	Enrique Chimento		0	(Argentina) Barracas Central
	FW	Alfredo Devincenzi (c)	24 January 1911 (aged 23)	3	(Argentina) Estudiantil Porteño
	GK	Héctor Freschi	22 May 1911 (aged 23)	0	(Argentina) Sarmiento
	FW	Alberto Galateo	4 March 1912 (aged 22)	0	(Argentina) Unión de Santa Fe
	GK	Ángel Grippa	2 March 1914 (aged 20)	0	(Argentina) Sportivo Alsina
	FW	Roberto Irañeta	21 March 1915 (aged 19)	0	(Argentina) Gimnasia y Esgrima de Mendoza
	FW	Luis Izzeta		0	(Argentina) Defensores de Belgrano
	MF	Arcadio López	15 September 1910 (aged 23)	2	(Argentina) Sportivo Buenos Aires
	MF	Alfonso Lorenzo		0	(Argentina) Barracas Central
	MF	José Nehin	13 October 1905 (aged 28)	0	(Argentina) Sportivo Desamparados
	DF	Juan Pedevilla	6 June 1909 (aged 24)	0	(Argentina) Estudiantil Porteño
	FW	Francisco Pérez		0	(Argentina) Almagro
	FW	Francisco Rúa	4 February 1911 (aged 23)	0	(Argentina) Sportivo Dock Sud
	MF	Constantino Urbieta Sosa	12 August 1907 (aged 26)	0	(Argentina) Godoy Cruz
	FW	Federico Wilde	1909	0	(Argentina) Unión de Santa Fe

== Austria ==
Head coach: Hugo Meisl

Although registered to the official list, Raftl, Janda, Stroh, Kaburek, Walzhofer and Hassmann remained on standby in Austria.

No.	Pos.	Player	Date of birth (age)	Caps	Club
	FW	Josef Bican	25 September 1913 (aged 20)	6	(Austria) Rapid Wien
	FW	Georg Braun	22 February 1907 (aged 27)	11	(Austria) Wiener AC
	DF	Franz Cisar	28 November 1908 (aged 25)	5	(Austria) Wiener AC
	GK	Friederich Franzl	6 March 1905 (aged 29)	15	(Austria) Wiener SC
	FW	Josef Hassmann	21 May 1910 (aged 24)	0	(Austria) First Vienna
	MF	Leopold Hofmann	31 October 1905 (aged 28)	19	(Austria) First Vienna
	FW	Johann Horvath	20 May 1903 (aged 31)	43	(Austria) First Vienna
	DF	Anton Janda	1 May 1904 (aged 30)	9	(Austria) Admira Wien
	FW	Matthias Kaburek	9 February 1911 (aged 23)	2	(Austria) Rapid Wien
	GK	Peter Platzer	29 May 1910 (aged 23)	11	(Austria) Admira Wien
	GK	Rudolf Raftl	7 February 1911 (aged 23)	1	(Austria) Rapid Wien
	FW	Anton Schall	22 June 1907 (aged 26)	26	(Austria) Admira Wien
	DF	Willibald Schmaus	16 June 1911 (aged 22)	0	(Austria) First Vienna
	DF	Karl Sesta	18 March 1906 (aged 28)	16	(Austria) Wiener AC
	FW	Matthias Sindelar	10 February 1903 (aged 31)	30	Austria Wien
	MF	Josef Smistik (c)	28 November 1905 (aged 28)	28	(Austria) Rapid Wien
	FW	Josef Stroh	5 March 1913 (aged 21)	0	Austria Wien
	MF	Johann Urbanek	10 October 1910 (aged 23)	1	(Austria) Admira Wien
	FW	Rudolf Viertl	12 November 1902 (aged 31)	9	Austria Wien
	MF	Franz Wagner	23 September 1911 (aged 22)	7	(Austria) Rapid Wien
	FW	Hans Walzhofer	23 March 1906 (aged 28)	4	(Austria) Wacker Wien
	FW	Karl Zischek	28 August 1910 (aged 23)	20	(Austria) Wacker Wien

== Belgium ==
Head coach: Hector Goetinck

Although registered to the official list, Bourgeois, Simons, Van Ingelgem, Ledent, Pappaert, Putmans, Versyp and Brichaut remained on standby in Belgium.

No.	Pos.	Player	Date of birth (age)	Caps	Club
	GK	Arnold Badjou	26 June 1909 (aged 24)	12	(Belgium) Royal Daring Club Molenbeek
	MF	Désiré Bourgeois	13 December 1908 (aged 25)	2	(Belgium) Royal FC Malinois
	FW	Jean Brichaut	29 July 1911 (aged 22)	11	(Belgium) Standard Liège
	FW	Jean Capelle	26 October 1913 (aged 20)	14	(Belgium) Standard Liège
	MF	Jean Claessens	18 June 1908 (aged 25)	12	(Belgium) Union Saint-Gilloise
	FW	François Devries	21 August 1913 (aged 20)	0	(Belgium) Royal Antwerp FC
	FW	Laurent Grimmonprez	14 December 1902 (aged 31)	9	(Belgium) Royal Racing Club de Gand
	MF	August Hellemans	14 September 1907 (aged 26)	28	(Belgium) Royal FC Malinois
	FW	Albert Heremans	13 April 1906 (aged 28)	6	(Belgium) Royal Daring Club Molenbeek
	DF	Constant Joacim	3 March 1908 (aged 26)	2	(Belgium) Royal Berchem Sport
	FW	Robert Lamoot	18 March 1911 (aged 23)	1	(Belgium) Royal Daring Club Molenbeek
	FW	Francois Ledent	4 July 1908 (aged 25)	3	(Belgium) Standard Liège
	DF	Jules Pappaert	5 November 1905 (aged 28)	4	(Belgium) Union Saint-Gilloise
	MF	Frans Peeraer	15 February 1913 (aged 21)	2	(Belgium) Royal Antwerp FC
	MF	Victor Putmans	29 May 1914 (aged 19)		(Belgium) Royale Union Hutoise
	MF	Charles Simons	10 April 1906 (aged 28)	10	(Belgium) Royal Antwerp FC
	DF	Philibert Smellinckx	17 January 1911 (aged 23)	5	(Belgium) Union Saint-Gilloise
	MF	Joseph Van Ingelgem	23 January 1912 (aged 22)	11	(Belgium) Royal Daring Club Molenbeek
	GK	André Vandewyer	21 June 1909 (aged 24)	4	(Belgium) Union Saint-Gilloise
	FW	Louis Versyp	5 December 1908 (aged 25)	33	(Belgium) Royal FC Brugeois
	FW	Bernard Voorhoof	10 May 1910 (aged 24)	31	(Belgium) KSK Liersche
	MF	Félix Welkenhuysen (c)	12 December 1908 (aged 25)	3	(Belgium) Union Saint-Gilloise

== Brazil ==
Head coach: Luiz Vinhaes

Although registered to the official list, Domingos, Tunga, Bile and Pamplona remained on standby in Brazil.

No.	Pos.	Player	Date of birth (age)	Caps	Club
	MF	Ariel	22 February 1910 (aged 24)	0	(Brazil) Botafogo
	FW	Armandinho	6 March 1911 (aged 23)	0	(Brazil) São Paulo
	FW	Áttila	16 December 1910 (aged 23)	0	(Brazil) Botafogo
	MF	Canalli	12 March 1907 (aged 27)	1	(Brazil) Botafogo
	FW	Carvalho Leite	25 June 1912 (aged 21)	4	(Brazil) Botafogo
	DF	Domingos da Guia	19 November 1912 (aged 25)	2	(Brazil) Vasco da Gama
	GK	Germano	14 March 1911 (aged 23)	0	(Brazil) Botafogo
	FW	Luisinho	29 March 1911 (aged 23)	0	(Brazil) São Paulo
	FW	Gabriel Fernando Bilé	15 March 1906 (aged 28)	0	(Brazil) Ypiranga SP
	FW	Leônidas	6 November 1913 (aged 20)	1	(Brazil) Vasco da Gama
	DF	Luiz Luz	29 November 1909 (aged 24)	0	(Brazil) Americano-RS
	MF	Martim	2 March 1911 (aged 23)	1	(Brazil) Botafogo
	DF	Octacílio	21 November 1909 (aged 24)	0	(Brazil) Botafogo
	MF	Pamplona	24 March 1904 (aged 30)	2	(Brazil) Botafogo
	FW	Patesko	12 November 1910 (aged 23)	0	(Uruguay) Nacional
	GK	Pedrosa	8 July 1913 (aged 20)	0	(Brazil) Botafogo
	DF	Sylvio Hoffmann	15 May 1908 (aged 26)	0	(Brazil) São Paulo
	MF	Tinoco	2 December 1904 (aged 29)	0	(Brazil) Vasco da Gama
	FW	Tunga	17 December 1908 (aged 25)	0	(Brazil) Palestra Italia
	MF	Waldyr	21 March 1912 (aged 22)	0	(Brazil) Botafogo
-	FW	Waldemar de Brito	17 May 1913 (aged 21)	0	(Brazil) São Paulo

- Notes
  - Domingos da Guia was not entered in the competition due to problems with the Nacional (URU), who had already ceded Patesko. The Uruguayan club demanded a compensation fee for CBD which was considered outrageous.
  - Benedicto (Torino), who was not registered officially, was part of the delegation helping in the training activities (Benedicto, who disputed the 1930 FIFA World Cup, in Italy).

== Czechoslovakia ==
Head coach: Karel Petrů

Although registered to the official list, Daučík, Srbek, Šterc and Šimperský remained on standby in Czechoslovakia.

No.	Pos.	Player	Date of birth (age)	Caps	Club
	MF	Jaroslav Bouček	13 November 1912 (aged 21)	1	(Czechoslovakia) Sparta Prague
	DF	Jaroslav Burgr	7 March 1906 (aged 28)	31	(Czechoslovakia) Sparta Prague
	MF	Štefan Čambal	17 December 1908 (aged 25)	14	(Czechoslovakia) Slavia Prague
	DF	Josef Čtyřoký	30 September 1906 (aged 27)	18	(Czechoslovakia) Sparta Prague
	DF	Ferdinand Daučík	31 May 1910 (aged 23)	1	(Czechoslovakia) ČsŠK Bratislava
	FW	František Junek	17 January 1907 (aged 27)	26	(Czechoslovakia) Slavia Prague
	FW	Géza Kalocsay	30 May 1913 (aged 20)	1	(Czechoslovakia) Sparta Prague
	MF	Vlastimil Kopecký	14 October 1912 (aged 21)	4	(Czechoslovakia) Slavia Prague
	MF	Josef Košťálek	31 August 1909 (aged 24)	11	(Czechoslovakia) Sparta Prague
	MF	Rudolf Krčil	5 March 1906 (aged 28)	12	(Czechoslovakia) Slavia Prague
	FW	Oldřich Nejedlý	25 December 1909 (aged 24)	14	(Czechoslovakia) Sparta Prague
	GK	Čestmír Patzel	2 December 1914 (aged 19)	0	(Czechoslovakia) Teplitzer FK
	GK	František Plánička (c)	2 June 1904 (aged 29)	48	(Czechoslovakia) Slavia Prague
	FW	Antonín Puč	16 May 1907 (aged 27)	42	(Czechoslovakia) Slavia Prague
	FW	Josef Silný	23 January 1902 (aged 32)	49	(France) Nîmes
	MF	Adolf Šimperský	5 August 1909 (aged 24)	11	(Czechoslovakia) Slavia Prague
	FW	Jiří Sobotka	6 June 1911 (aged 22)	3	(Czechoslovakia) Slavia Prague
	FW	Erich Srbek	4 June 1908 (aged 25)	6	(Czechoslovakia) Sparta Prague
	FW	František Šterc	27 January 1912 (aged 22)	0	(Czechoslovakia) Židenice
	FW	František Svoboda	5 August 1906 (aged 27)	39	(Czechoslovakia) Slavia Prague
	MF	Antonín Vodička	1 March 1907 (aged 27)	14	(Czechoslovakia) Slavia Prague
	DF	Ladislav Ženíšek	7 March 1904 (aged 30)	15	(Czechoslovakia) Slavia Prague

== Egypt ==
Head coach: (Scotland) James McCrae

Although registered to the official list, Bakhati, El-Soury and Youssef remained on standby in Egypt.

No.	Pos.	Player	Date of birth (age)	Caps	Club
	MF	Mohammed Bakhati		1	(Egypt) Zamalek
	MF	Hassan El-Far	21 May 1912 (aged 22)	2	(Egypt) Zamalek
	FW	Mahmoud El-Nigero		0	(Egypt) Cairo Shourta Police
	DF	Ali El-Kaf	15 June 1906 (aged 27)	2	(Egypt) Zamalek
	DF	Yacout El-Soury		4	(Egypt) Al-Ittihad
	FW	Mahmoud 'El-Tetsh' Mokhtar (c)	23 December 1907 (aged 26)	5	(Egypt) Al Ahly
	GK	Aziz Fahmy		1	(Egypt) Al Ahly
	FW	Abdulrahman Fawzi	11 August 1909 (aged 24)	2	(Egypt) Al-Masry AC Port Said
	MF	Ahmed Halim Ibrahim	10 February 1910 (aged 24)		(Egypt) Zamalek
	DF	Hamidu		2	(Egypt) Al-Olympi Alexandria
	FW	Mohammed Hassan	5 February 1905 (aged 29)	-	(Egypt) Al-Masry AC Port Said
	MF	Hafez Kasseb		0	(Egypt) Al-Olympi Alexandria
	FW	Mohamed Latif	23 October 1909 (aged 24)	2	(Egypt) Zamalek
	FW	Labib Mahmoud		0	(Egypt) Al Ahly
	GK	Mustafa Mansour	2 August 1914 (aged 19)		(Egypt) Al Ahly
	FW	Kamel Mosaoud	2 August 1914 (aged 19)		(Egypt) Al Ahly
	MF	Ismail Rafaat	12 March 1912 (aged 22)	0	(Egypt) Zamalek
	MF	Hassan Raghab	1 January 1909 (aged 25)	2	(Egypt) Al-Ittihad
	FW	Mostafa Taha	23 March 1910 (aged 24)		(Egypt) Zamalek
	MF	Moustafa Helmi Youssef	11 June 1911 (aged 22)	0	(Egypt) Al-Masry AC Port Said

== France ==
Head coach: (England) George Kimpton

Although registered to the official list, Défossé, Vandooren, Beaucourt, Delmer, Korb, Laurent and Courtois remained on standby in France.

No.	Pos.	Player	Date of birth (age)	Caps	Club
	FW	Joseph Alcazar	15 June 1911 (aged 22)	9	(France) Marseille
	FW	Alfred Aston	16 May 1912 (aged 22)	4	(France) Red Star Paris
	MF	Georges Beaucourt	15 April 1912 (aged 22)	0	(France) Olympique Lillois
	FW	Roger Courtois	30 May 1912 (aged 21)	1	(France) Sochaux
	GK	Robert Défossé	16 June 1909 (aged 24)	8	(France) Olympique Lillois
	MF	Edmond Delfour	1 November 1907 (aged 26)	24	(France) Racing Club
	MF	Célestin Delmer	15 February 1907 (aged 27)	11	(France) Excelsior Roubaix
	MF	Louis Gabrillargues	16 June 1914 (aged 19)	0	(France) Sète
	DF	Joseph Gonzales	19 February 1907 (aged 27)	0	(France) Fives
	FW	Fritz Keller	21 August 1913 (aged 20)	1	(France) Strasbourg
	FW	Pierre Korb	20 April 1908 (aged 26)	12	(France) Mulhouse
	FW	Lucien Laurent	10 December 1907 (aged 26)	9	(France) CA Paris
	MF	Noël Liétaer	17 November 1908 (aged 25)	5	(France) Excelsior Roubaix
	GK	René Llense	14 July 1913 (aged 20)	0	(France) Sète
	DF	Jacques Mairesse	27 February 1905 (aged 29)	5	(France) Red Star Paris
	DF	Étienne Mattler	25 December 1905 (aged 28)	21	(France) Sochaux
	FW	Jean Nicolas	9 June 1913 (aged 20)	11	(France) Rouen
	MF	Roger Rio	13 February 1913 (aged 21)	10	(France) Rouen
	GK	Alex Thépot (c)	30 July 1906 (aged 27)	27	(France) Red Star Paris
	DF	Jules Vandooren	30 December 1908 (aged 25)	7	(France) Olympique Lillois
	FW	Émile Veinante	12 June 1907 (aged 26)	11	(France) Racing Club
	MF	Georges Verriest	15 July 1909 (aged 24)	4	(France) Excelsior Roubaix

== Germany ==
Head coach: Otto Nerz

Although registered to the official list, Buchloh, Albrecht, Dienert and Streb remained on standby in Germany.

No.	Pos.	Player	Date of birth (age)	Caps	Club
	MF	Ernst Albrecht	12 November 1907 (aged 26)	17	(Germany) Fortuna Düsseldorf
	MF	Jakob Bender	23 March 1910 (aged 24)	3	(Germany) Fortuna Düsseldorf
	GK	Fritz Buchloh	26 November 1909 (aged 24)	5	(Germany) VfB Speldorf
	DF	Willy Busch	4 January 1907 (aged 27)	2	(Germany) TuS Duisburg
	FW	Edmund Conen	10 November 1914 (aged 19)	1	(Germany) FV Saarbrücken
	FW	Franz Dienert	1 January 1900 (aged 34)	0	(Germany) VfB Mühlburg
	MF	Rudolf Gramlich	6 June 1908 (aged 25)	7	(Germany) Eintracht Frankfurt
	DF	Sigmund Haringer	9 December 1908 (aged 25)	8	(Germany) Bayern Munich
	FW	Matthias Heidemann	7 February 1912 (aged 22)	1	(Germany) Werder Bremen
	MF	Karl Hohmann	18 June 1908 (aged 25)	8	(Germany) VfL Benrath
	GK	Hans Jakob	16 June 1908 (aged 25)	8	(Germany) Jahn Regensburg
	DF	Paul Janes	10 March 1912 (aged 22)	5	(Germany) Fortuna Düsseldorf
	FW	Stanislaus Kobierski	15 November 1910 (aged 23)	12	(Germany) Fortuna Düsseldorf
	GK	Willibald Kreß	13 November 1906 (aged 27)	13	(Germany) Dresdner SC
	FW	Ernst Lehner	7 November 1912 (aged 21)	3	(Germany) TSV Schwaben Augsburg
	DF	Reinhold Münzenberg	25 January 1909 (aged 25)	4	(Germany) Alemannia Aachen
	FW	Rudolf Noack	20 March 1913 (aged 21)	1	(Germany) SV Hamburg
	DF	Hans Schwartz	1 March 1913 (aged 21)	0	(Germany) Viktoria Hamburg
	FW	Otto Siffling	3 August 1912 (aged 21)	0	(Germany) Waldhof Mannheim
	FW	Josef Streb	16 April 1912 (aged 22)	0	(Germany) Wacker München
	FW	Fritz Szepan (c)	2 September 1907 (aged 26)	4	(Germany) Schalke 04
	MF	Paul Zielinski	20 November 1911 (aged 22)	0	(Germany) Union Hamborn

== Hungary ==
Head coach: Ödön Nádas

No.	Pos.	Player	Date of birth (age)	Caps	Club
	FW	István Avar	30 May 1905 (aged 28)	17	(Hungary) Újpest
	DF	Sándor Bíró	19 August 1911 (aged 22)	13	(Hungary) Hungária
	MF	János Dudás	13 February 1911 (aged 23)	0	(Hungary) Hungária
	DF	Gyula Futó	29 December 1908 (aged 25)	0	(Hungary) Újpest
	GK	József Háda	2 March 1911 (aged 23)	11	(Hungary) Ferencváros
	FW	Tibor Kemény	5 March 1913 (aged 21)	5	(Hungary) Ferencváros
	MF	Gyula Lázár	24 January 1911 (aged 23)	19	(Hungary) Ferencváros
	FW	Imre Markos	9 June 1908 (aged 25)	13	(Hungary) Bocskai
	MF	István Palotás	5 March 1908 (aged 26)	4	(Hungary) Bocskai
	MF	Gyula Polgár	8 February 1912 (aged 22)	5	(Hungary) Ferencváros
	FW	György Sárosi	15 September 1912 (aged 21)	22	(Hungary) Ferencváros
	MF	Rezső Somlai	22 May 1911 (aged 23)	0	(Hungary) Kispest
	DF	László Sternberg	28 May 1905 (aged 28)	7	(Hungary) Újpest
	GK	Antal Szabó	4 September 1910 (aged 23)	10	(Hungary) Hungária
	FW	Gábor P. Szabó	14 October 1902 (aged 31)	10	(Hungary) Újpest
	MF	Antal Szalay	12 March 1912 (aged 22)	8	(Hungary) Újpest
	MF	György Szűcs	23 April 1912 (aged 22)	3	(Hungary) Újpest
	FW	István Tamássy	30 June 1906 (aged 27)	1	(Hungary) Újpest
	FW	Pál Teleki	5 March 1906 (aged 28)	6	(Hungary) Bocskai
	FW	Géza Toldi	11 February 1909 (aged 25)	21	(Hungary) Ferencváros
	DF	József Vágó	30 June 1906 (aged 27)	1	(Hungary) Bocskai
	FW	Jenő Vincze	20 November 1908 (aged 25)	5	(Hungary) Bocskai

== Italy ==
Head coach: Vittorio Pozzo

No.	Pos.	Player	Date of birth (age)	Caps	Club
	DF	Luigi Allemandi	18 November 1903 (aged 30)	9	(Italy) Ambrosiana-Inter
	FW	Pietro Arcari	2 December 1909 (aged 24)	0	(Italy) Milan
	MF	Luigi Bertolini	13 September 1904 (aged 29)	19	(Italy) Juventus
	FW	Felice Borel	5 April 1914 (aged 20)	2	(Italy) Juventus
	DF	Umberto Caligaris	26 July 1901 (aged 32)	59	(Italy) Juventus
	MF	Armando Castellazzi	7 October 1904 (aged 29)	2	(Italy) Ambrosiana-Inter
	GK	Giuseppe Cavanna	18 September 1905 (aged 28)	0	(Italy) Napoli
	GK	Gianpiero Combi	20 November 1902 (aged 31)	42	(Italy) Juventus
	FW	Attilio Demaria	19 March 1909 (aged 25)	1	(Italy) Ambrosiana-Inter
	FW	Giovanni Ferrari	6 December 1907 (aged 26)	19	(Italy) Juventus
	MF	Attilio Ferraris	26 March 1904 (aged 30)	22	(Italy) Roma
	FW	Enrique Guaita	11 July 1910 (aged 23)	2	(Italy) Roma
	FW	Anfilogino Guarisi	26 December 1905 (aged 28)	5	(Italy) Lazio
	GK	Guido Masetti	22 November 1907 (aged 26)	0	(Italy) Roma
	MF	Giuseppe Meazza	23 August 1910 (aged 23)	22	(Italy) Ambrosiana-Inter
	MF	Luis Monti	15 May 1901 (aged 33)	10	(Italy) Juventus
	DF	Eraldo Monzeglio	5 June 1906 (aged 27)	12	(Italy) Bologna
	FW	Raimundo Orsi	2 December 1901 (aged 32)	27	(Italy) Juventus
	MF	Mario Pizziolo	7 December 1909 (aged 24)	8	(Italy) Fiorentina
	DF	Virginio Rosetta (c)	25 February 1902 (aged 32)	51	(Italy) Juventus
	FW	Angelo Schiavio	15 October 1905 (aged 28)	17	(Italy) Bologna
	MF	Mario Varglien	26 December 1905 (aged 28)	0	(Italy) Juventus

== Netherlands ==
Head coach: (England) Bob Glendenning

Although registered to the official list, Vrauwdeunt and Paauwe remained on standby in the Netherlands.

No.	Pos.	Player	Date of birth (age)	Caps	Club
	MF	Wim Anderiesen	27 November 1903 (aged 30)	20	(Netherlands) Ajax
	FW	Beb Bakhuys	16 April 1909 (aged 25)	7	(Netherlands) ZAC Zwolle
	FW	Jan Graafland	21 August 1909 (aged 24)	0	(Netherlands) HBS Craeyenhout
	GK	Leo Halle	17 February 1903 (aged 31)	2	(Netherlands) Go Ahead Eagles Deventer
	FW	Wim Langendaal	13 April 1909 (aged 25)	0	(Netherlands) Xerxes Rotterdam
	FW	Kees Mijnders	28 September 1912 (aged 21)	3	(Netherlands) DFC Dordrecht
	FW	Jaap Mol	3 February 1912 (aged 22)	5	(Netherlands) Kooger FC
	MF	Toon Oprinsen	25 November 1910 (aged 23)	1	(Netherlands) NOAD Breda
	MF	Bas Paauwe	4 October 1911 (aged 22)	1	(Netherlands) Feijenoord
	MF	Henk Pellikaan	10 November 1910 (aged 23)	10	(Netherlands) Longa Tilburg
	FW	Arend Schoemaker	8 November 1911 (aged 22)	1	(Netherlands) Quick Den Haag
	FW	Kick Smit	3 November 1911 (aged 22)	4	(Netherlands) HFC Haarlem
	GK	Gejus van der Meulen	23 January 1903 (aged 31)	53	(Netherlands) Koninklijke HFC
	DF	Jan van Diepenbeek	5 August 1903 (aged 30)	2	(Netherlands) Ajax
	MF	Puck van Heel (c)	21 January 1904 (aged 30)	41	(Netherlands) Feijenoord
	GK	Adri van Male	7 October 1910 (aged 23)	4	(Netherlands) Feijenoord
	FW	Joop van Nellen	15 March 1910 (aged 24)	17	(Netherlands) DHC
	DF	Sjef van Run	12 January 1904 (aged 30)	19	(Netherlands) PSV
	FW	Leen Vente	14 May 1911 (aged 23)	5	(Netherlands) Neptunus Rotterdam
	FW	Manus Vrauwdeunt	29 April 1915 (aged 19)	0	(Netherlands) Feijenoord
	DF	Mauk Weber	1 March 1914 (aged 20)	14	(Netherlands) ADO Den Haag
	FW	Frank Wels	21 February 1909 (aged 25)	14	(Netherlands) Unitas Gorinchem

== Romania ==
Head coach: Josef Uridil and Costel Rădulescu

The Romanian Football Federation had nominated Zoltán Beke in case Bindea did not recover in time from injury, but this contravened FIFA regulations and so Beke, who travelled with the team to Italy, was not eligible to play.

Although registered to the official list, Konrard, Bürger, Juhász, Weichelt, Baratky, Klimek and Schwartz remained on standby in Romania.

No.	Pos.	Player	Date of birth (age)	Caps	Club
	DF	Gheorghe Albu	12 September 1909 (aged 24)	20	(Romania) Venus București
	FW	Iuliu Baratky	14 May 1910 (aged 24)	1	(Romania) Crișana Oradea
	FW	Silviu Bindea	24 October 1912 (aged 21)	8	(Romania) Ripensia Timișoara
	FW	Iuliu Bodola	26 February 1912 (aged 22)	20	(Romania) CAO Oradea
	DF	Rudolf Bürger	31 October 1908 (aged 25)	14	(Romania) Ripensia Timișoara
	FW	Gheorghe Ciolac	10 August 1908 (aged 25)	14	(Romania) Ripensia Timișoara
	DF	Alexandru Cuedan	26 September 1910 (aged 23)	0	(Romania) Rapid București
	MF	Vasile Deheleanu	12 August 1910 (aged 23)	1	(Romania) Ripensia Timișoara
	FW	Ștefan Dobay	26 September 1909 (aged 24)	12	(Romania) Ripensia Timișoara
	MF	Gusztáv Juhász	19 December 1911 (aged 22)	0	(Romania) Juventus București
	FW	István Klimek	15 April 1913 (aged 21)	0	(Romania) ILSA Timișoara
	GK	Stanislav Konrad	23 October 1913 (aged 20)	0	(Romania) CA Timișoara
	MF	Rudolf Kotormány	23 January 1911 (aged 23)	6	(Romania) Ripensia Timișoara
	FW	Nicolae Kovács	29 December 1911 (aged 22)	19	(Romania) CAO Oradea
	MF	József Moravetz	14 January 1911 (aged 23)	8	(Romania) RGM Timișoara
	GK	Adalbert Püllöck	6 April 1907 (aged 27)	5	(Romania) Crișana Oradea
	FW	Sándor Schwartz	18 January 1909 (aged 25)	4	(Romania) Ripensia Timișoara
	FW	Grațian Sepi	30 December 1910 (aged 23)	18	(Romania) Universitatea Cluj
	DF	Lazăr Sfera	29 April 1909 (aged 25)	2	(Romania) Venus București
	DF	Emerich Vogl (c)	12 August 1905 (aged 28)	27	(Romania) Juventus București
	MF	Károly Weichelt	2 March 1906 (aged 28)	1	(Romania) CAO Oradea
	GK	Vilmos Zombori	11 January 1906 (aged 28)	3	(Romania) Ripensia Timișoara

== Spain ==
Head coach: Amadeo García

Although registered to the official list, Hilario and Sabater remained on standby in Spain.

No.	Pos.	Player	Date of birth (age)	Caps	Club
	MF	Crisant Bosch	26 December 1907 (aged 26)	7	(Spain) Espanyol
	FW	Campanal I	9 February 1912 (aged 22)	0	(Spain) Sevilla
	FW	Chacho	14 April 1911 (aged 23)	2	(Spain) Deportivo La Coruña
	MF	Leonardo Cilaurren	5 November 1912 (aged 21)	8	(Spain) Athletic Bilbao
	DF	Ciriaco	8 August 1904 (aged 29)	11	(Spain) FC Madrid
	MF	Fede	14 October 1912 (aged 21)	2	(Spain) Sevilla
	FW	Guillermo Gorostiza	15 February 1909 (aged 25)	9	(Spain) Athletic Bilbao
	MF	Hilario	8 December 1905 (aged 28)	1	(Spain) FC Madrid
	FW	José Iraragorri	16 March 1912 (aged 22)	1	(Spain) Athletic Bilbao
	FW	Lafuente	31 December 1907 (aged 26)	5	(Spain) Athletic Bilbao
	FW	Isidro Lángara	25 May 1912 (aged 22)	3	(Spain) FC Oviedo
	MF	Simón Lecue	11 February 1912 (aged 22)	0	(Spain) Betis Balompie
	MF	Martín Marculeta	24 September 1907 (aged 26)	13	(Spain) Donostia
	FW	Luis Marín Sabater	4 September 1906 (aged 27)	0	(Spain) Atlético Madrid
	MF	José Muguerza	15 September 1911 (aged 22)	1	(Spain) Athletic Bilbao
	GK	Juan José Nogués	28 March 1909 (aged 25)	0	(Spain) Barcelona
	DF	Jacinto Quincoces	17 July 1905 (aged 28)	19	(Spain) FC Madrid
	FW	Luis Regueiro	1 July 1908 (aged 25)	16	(Spain) FC Madrid
	MF	Pedro Solé	7 May 1905 (aged 29)	3	(Spain) Espanyol
	MF	Martí Ventolrà	16 December 1906 (aged 27)	5	(Spain) Barcelona
	DF	Ramón Zabalo	10 June 1910 (aged 23)	5	(Spain) Barcelona
	GK	Ricardo Zamora (c)	21 January 1901 (aged 33)	42	(Spain) FC Madrid

== Sweden ==
Head coach: József Nagy

Although registered to the official list, Hult, Jansson, Bunke, Holmberg and Lundhal remained on standby in Sweden.

No.	Pos.	Player	Date of birth (age)	Caps	Club
	MF	Ernst Andersson	26 March 1909 (aged 25)	11	(Sweden) IFK Göteborg
	DF	Otto Andersson	7 May 1910 (aged 24)	9	(Sweden) Örgryte IS
	DF	Sven Andersson	14 February 1907 (aged 27)	15	(Sweden) AIK
	DF	Nils Axelsson	18 January 1906 (aged 28)	7	(Sweden) Hälsingborgs IF
	FW	Lennart Bunke	3 April 1912 (aged 22)	5	(Sweden) Hälsingborgs IF
	MF	Rune Carlsson	1 October 1909 (aged 24)	5	(Sweden) IFK Eskilstuna
	MF	Victor Carlund	5 February 1906 (aged 28)	6	(Sweden) Örgryte IS
	FW	Gösta Dunker	16 September 1905 (aged 28)	13	(Sweden) Sandvikens IF
	FW	Ragnar Gustavsson	28 September 1907 (aged 26)	6	(Sweden) GAIS
	FW	Carl-Erik Holmberg	17 July 1906 (aged 27)	8	(Sweden) Örgryte IS
	GK	Sture Hult	19 October 1910 (aged 23)	5	(Sweden) IFK Eskilstuna
	FW	Gunnar Jansson	17 July 1907 (aged 26)	1	(Sweden) Gefle IF
	FW	Sven Jonasson	9 July 1909 (aged 24)	2	(Sweden) IF Elfsborg
	FW	Tore Keller	4 January 1905 (aged 29)	18	(Sweden) IK Sleipner
	FW	Knut Kroon	19 June 1906 (aged 27)	31	(Sweden) Hälsingborgs IF
	FW	Harry Lundahl	16 October 1905 (aged 28)	14	(Sweden) IFK Eskilstuna
	FW	Gunnar Olsson	19 July 1908 (aged 25)	6	(Sweden) GAIS
	GK	Anders Rydberg	3 March 1903 (aged 31)	18	(Sweden) IFK Göteborg
	MF	Nils Rosén (c)	22 May 1902 (aged 32)	20	(Sweden) Hälsingborgs IF
	FW	Arvid Thörn	29 October 1906 (aged 27)	2	(Sweden) IFK Grängesberg
	GK	Eivar Widlund	15 June 1905 (aged 28)	5	(Sweden) AIK

== Switzerland ==
Head coach: Heinrich Müller

Although registered to the official list, Huber, Gobet, Loichot and Hochsträsser remained on standby in Switzerland.

No.	Pos.	Player	Date of birth (age)	Caps	Club
	FW	André Abegglen	7 March 1909 (aged 25)	29	(Switzerland) Grasshopper
	GK	Renato Bizzozero	7 September 1912 (aged 21)	0	(Switzerland) Lugano
	FW	Joseph Bossi	29 August 1911 (aged 22)	3	(Switzerland) Bern
	FW	Albert Büche	1911	5	(Switzerland) Nordstern Basel
	FW	Otto Bühler			(Switzerland) Grasshopper
	MF	Ernst Frick		0	(Switzerland) Luzern
	DF	Louis Gobet	28 October 1908 (aged 25)	1	(Switzerland) Bern
	MF	Albert Guinchard	10 November 1914 (aged 19)	2	(Switzerland) Servette
	FW	Erwin Hochsträsser		2	(Switzerland) Lausanne-Sport
	GK	Willy Huber	17 December 1913 (aged 20)	2	(Switzerland) Grasshopper
	MF	Ernst Hufschmid	4 February 1913 (aged 21)	6	(Switzerland) Basel
	MF	Fernand Jaccard	8 October 1907 (aged 26)	0	(Switzerland) La Tour-de-Peilz
	FW	Alfred Jäck	2 August 1911 (aged 22)	16	(Switzerland) Basel
	FW	Willy Jäggi	28 July 1906 (aged 27)	14	(Switzerland) Lausanne-Sport
	FW	Leopold Kielholz	9 June 1911 (aged 22)	4	(Switzerland) Servette
	MF	Edmond Loichot		4	(Switzerland) Servette
	DF	Severino Minelli (c)	6 September 1909 (aged 24)	27	(Switzerland) Grasshopper
	DF	Arnoldo Ortelli	5 August 1913 (aged 20)	0	(Switzerland) Lugano
	FW	Raymond Passello	12 January 1905 (aged 29)	17	(Switzerland) Servette
	GK	Frank Séchehaye	3 November 1907 (aged 26)	31	(Switzerland) Servette
	FW	Willy von Känel	30 October 1909 (aged 24)	15	(Switzerland) Bienne-Biel
	DF	Walter Weiler	4 December 1903 (aged 30)	7	(Switzerland) Grasshopper

== United States ==
Head coach: David Gould

No.	Pos.	Player	Date of birth (age)	Caps	Club
	MF	Tom Amrhein	9 March 1911 (aged 23)	0	(United States) Baltimore Canton
	DF	Ed Czerkiewicz	8 July 1912 (aged 21)	1	(United States) Pawtucket Rangers
	FW	Walter Dick	20 September 1905 (aged 28)	0	(United States) Pawtucket Rangers
	FW	Aldo Donelli	22 July 1907 (aged 26)	1	(United States) Pittsburgh Curry Silver Tops
	MF	Bill Fiedler	10 January 1910 (aged 24)	0	(United States) Philadelphia German-Americans
	MF	Tom Florie	6 September 1897 (aged 36)	7	(United States) Pawtucket Rangers
	MF	Jimmy Gallagher	7 June 1901 (aged 32)	7	(United States) Cleveland Slavia
	MF	Billy Gonsalves	10 August 1908 (aged 25)	5	(United States) St. Louis Stix, Baer & Fuller
	DF	Al Harker	11 April 1910 (aged 24)	0	(United States) Philadelphia German-Americans
	GK	Julius Hjulian	15 March 1903 (aged 31)	1	(United States) Chicago Wonderbolts
	MF	William Lehman	20 December 1901 (aged 32)	1	(United States) St. Louis Stix, Baer & Fuller
	MF	Tom Lynch		0	(United States) Brooklyn Celtic
	DF	Joe Martinelli	22 August 1916 (aged 17)	0	(United States) Pawtucket Rangers
	FW	Willie McLean	27 January 1904 (aged 30)	1	(United States) St. Louis Stix, Baer & Fuller
	DF	George Moorhouse (c)	4 May 1901 (aged 33)	6	(United States) New York Americans
	FW	Werner Nilsen	24 February 1904 (aged 30)	1	(United States) St. Louis Stix, Baer & Fuller
	MF	Peter Pietras	21 April 1908 (aged 26)	1	(United States) Philadelphia German-Americans
	DF	Herman Rapp	6 December 1908 (aged 25)	0	(United States) Philadelphia German-Americans
	FW	Francis Ryan	10 January 1908 (aged 26)	2	(United States) Philadelphia German-Americans

== Coaches representation by country ==
Nº	Country	Coaches
2	England	Bob Glendenning (Netherlands), George Kimpton (France)
2	Italy	Felipe Pascucci (Argentina), Vittorio Pozzo
2	Romania	Costel Rădulescu, Josef Uridil
1	Austria	Hugo Meisl
1	Belgium	Hector Goetinck
1	Brazil	Luiz Vinhaes
1	Czechoslovakia	Karel Petrů
1	(German Empire) Germany	Otto Nerz
1	Hungary	Ödön Nádas
1	Scotland	James McCrae (Egypt)
1	Spain	Amadeo García
1	Sweden	József Nagy
1	Switzerland	Heinrich Müller
1	United States	David Gould
