= 1938 Egypt Cup final =

- Event: 1937–38 Egypt Cup
Zamalek SC	Al-Ahly
1	0
Zamalek SC	Al-Ahly
1	1
- Date: 14 May 1938
- Referee: Mohamed Foad Hafez

Replay
Zamalek SC	Al-Ahly
1	0
- Date: 2 December 1938
- Referee: Mohamed Foad Hafez

1938 Egypt Cup final, was the final match of 1937–38 Egypt Cup, between Zamalek SC (El-Mokhtalat) & Al-Ahly, with the game ending 1–1 meant the two sides could not be separated, so a replay was played during the following season, the replay game ends 1–0, Zamalek SC won the cup for the 4th time.

== Route to the final ==
Zamalek		Round	Al Ahly
Opponent	Result	1937–38 Egypt Cup	Opponent	Result
Ittihad	2–0	Quarterfinals
Teram	2–0	Semifinals	Sekka	3–2

== Game description ==
=== Match details ===
14 May 1938

Zamalek	1 – 1 (a.e.t.)	Al-Ahly
Hussein Labib 30'	Report	Hassan El-Far 87' (o.g.)

Referee: Mohamed Foad Hafez

Zamalek:
GK	(Egypt) Yehia Emam
RB	(Egypt) Ibrahim Negm El-Din
CB	(Egypt) Ibrahim Halim
CB	(Egypt) Hassan El-Far
LB	(Egypt) Omar Shendi
CM	(Egypt) Ali Shoair
CM	(Egypt) Hussein Labib
RW	(Egypt) Mahmoud Emam
AM	(Egypt) Abdulrahman Fawzi
LW	(Egypt) Mostafa Taha
CF	(Egypt) Zoklot
Manager:

Ahly:
GK	(Egypt) Aziz Fahmi
RB	(Egypt) El-Wahsh
CB	(Egypt) Kamel Masoud
CB	(Egypt) Mourad Fahmi
LB	(Egypt) Moustafa Elwani "El-Kassar"
CM	(Egypt) Hussein El-Far
CM	(Egypt) Hani Kamel
RW	(Egypt) Saleh El-Sawwaf
CM	(Egypt) Mahmoud Mokhtar El-Tetch
FW	(Egypt) Moustafa Latif
FW	(Egypt) Abdel Maguid El-Ashry
Manager:

Assistant referees:
Hassan Reyadh
Zaki Osman

=== Replay ===
2 December 1938

Zamalek	1 – 0	Al-Ahly
Hussein El-Far 30' (o.g.)	Report

Referee: Mohamed Foad Hafez

Zamalek:
GK	(Egypt) Yehia Emam
RB	(Egypt) Ibrahim Negm El-Din
CB	(Egypt) Ibrahim Halim
CB	(Egypt) Hassan El-Far
LB	(Egypt) Omar Shendi
CM	(Egypt) Qadry Moustafa
CM	(Egypt) Hussein Labib
RW	(Egypt) Mohamed Latif
AM	(Egypt) Mohammed Hassan Helmy
LW	(Egypt) Mostafa Taha
CF	(Egypt) Zoklot
Manager:

Ahly:
GK	(Egypt) Hassan Zohni
RB	(Egypt) El-Wahsh
CB	(Egypt) Kamel Masoud
CB	(Egypt) Mourad Fahmi
LB	(Egypt) Moustafa Elwani "El-Kassar"
CM	(Egypt) Hussein El-Far
CM	(Egypt) Moustafa Latif
RW	(Egypt) Abd El-Karim Sakr
CM	(Egypt) Saleh El-Sawwaf
FW	(Egypt) Hussein Madkour
FW	(Egypt) Abdel Maguid El-Ashry
Manager:
