= Albarracín (surname) =

Albarracín is a Spanish surname. Notable people with the surname include:

- Eric Albarracin (born c. 1983), American wrestler
- Ernesto Albarracín, Argentine footballer
- Francisco Albarracín (born 1985), Argentine rugby union player
- Justo Albarracín (born 1951), Argentine equestrian
- Miguel Albarracín (born 1981), Argentine judoka
- Paulo Albarracín (born 1989), Peruvian footballer
- Pilar Albarracín (born 1968), Spanish artist
- Severino Albarracín (1851–1878), Spanish anarchist
- Tobías Albarracín (born 1984), Argentine footballer
- Jose Albarracín (born 1988), Reliability Engineer
