= Chimento =

Chimento is a surname. Notable people with the surname include:

- Adriano Chimento, Italian jeweller and businessman
- Enrique Chimento, Argentine footballer
- Marcelo Chimento (born 1964), Argentine actor
