= Dienert =

Dienert is a surname. Notable people with the surname include:

- Franz Dienert (1900–1978), German football player
- Frédéric Dienert (1874–1948), French microbiologist
- Millie Dienert (1917–2015), American evangelist
