= Grippo =

Grippo is a surname. Notable people with the surname include:

- Angela Grippo, American neuroscientist
- Carlo Grippo (born 1955), Italian middle distance runner
- Charles Grippo, American playwright, author and producer
- Diego Lo Grippo (born 1978), Argentine-Italian basketball player
- Simone Grippo (born 1988), Swiss footballer
- Víctor Grippo (1936–2002), Argentine painter

== See also ==
- Grippo's, snack-food manufacturer
- Grippa, surname
