= Weichelt =

Weichelt is a German surname. Notable people with the surname include:

- Friedrich Weichelt (1894–1961), German explosives engineer
- Károly Weichelt (1906–1971), Romanian footballer
- Manuela Weichelt-Picard (born 1967), Swiss politician
- Stefanie Weichelt (born 1983), German footballer
- Ulrike Weichelt (born 1977), German cyclist
