= Grippa =

Grippa is an Italian surname – possibly of Lombard origin – which is derived from the Latin personal name Agrippa. Notable people with the surname include:

- Ángel Grippa (1914–?), Argentine footballer
- Carmela Grippa (born 1973), Italian politician
- Jacques Grippa (1913–1990), Belgian politician

== See also ==
- Grippo, surname
