= Graafland =

Graafland is a Dutch surname. Notable people with the surname include:

- Ronald Graafland, Dutch footballer
- Eddy Pieters Graafland, Dutch footballer
- Jan Graafland, Dutch footballer
- Jhr. J.L.M.Graafland (Joan Leo Magdalenus Graafland), author of the "Heraldische encyclopædie" with A. Stalins, 1925

== See also ==
- Graafland, South Holland, hamlet
