= Streb =

Streb is a surname. Notable people with the surname include:

- Elizabeth Streb, American choreographer, performer, and dance teacher
- Josef Streb, German footballer
- Marla Streb, American mountain bike racer
- Robert Streb, American golfer
