= Ladislau Csillag =

Romanian professional footballer

Personal information
- Date of birth: 8 February 1896
- Place of birth: Győrcsanak, Austria-Hungary
- Date of death: 29 October 1971 (aged 75)
- Place of death: Oradea, Romania
- Position: Midfielder

Youth career
- 1907–1914: Terézváros

Senior career*
Years	Team	Apps	(Gls)
1914–1919	Terézváros	16	(1)
1921–1927	CA Oradea	29	(0)
Total		45	(1)

International career
1924	Romania	1	(0)

Managerial career
- 1930–1932: Crișana Oradea
- 1933: Juventus București
- 1934: Gloria CFR Arad
- 1934: CA Oradea
- 1938: Juventus București (assistant)
- 1939–1940: Sportul Studențesc
- 1958–1960: CS Oradea
- * Club domestic league appearances and goals as of 7 July 2020

Ladislau Csillag (8 February 1896 – 29 October 1971) was a Romanian professional footballer and manager of Hungarian ethnicity. As a footballer, Csillag played for Terézváros and Club Atletic Oradea. After retirement, Csillag was the manager of Crișana Oradea, Juventus București, Gloria CFR Arad and Club Atletic Oradea, among others.

== International career ==
Ladislau Csillag played one friendly game for Romania, when he came as a substitute and replaced Károly Weichelt at half-time in a 4–1 away loss against Czechoslovakia.

== Honours ==
=== Player ===
CA Oradea

- Regional Championship: 1923–24, 1924–25

=== Manager ===
Crișana Oradea

- Regional Championship: 1930–31, 1931–32
