= Ali El-Kaf =

Egyptian footballer (1906–1979)

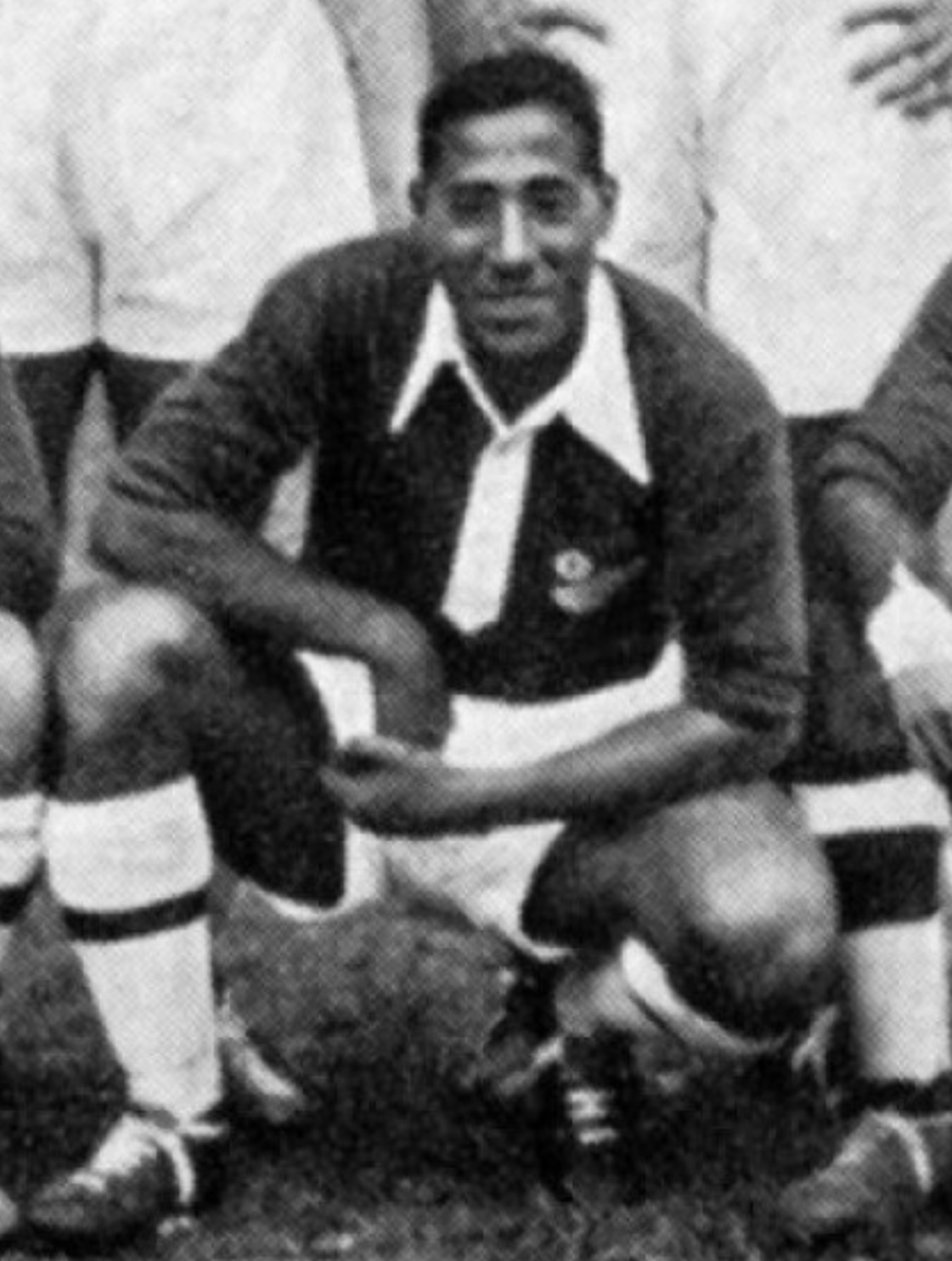
- El-Kaf with Egypt in 1936 Olympic Games

Personal information
- Full name: Ali Mohammed El-Kaf El-Sayed
- Date of birth: 15 June 1906
- Place of birth: Beni Suef, Egypt
- Date of death: 1979 (aged 73)
- Position: Defender

Senior career*
Years	Team	Apps	(Gls)
1924–1930	Tersana		
1930–1938	Zamalek		

International career
- Egypt
- * Club domestic league appearances and goals

Ali Mohammed El-Kaf El-Sayed (Arabic: علي محمد الكف السيد; 15 June 1906 – 1979) commonly known as Ali Kaf, was an Egyptian footballer who played as a defender for Egypt in the 1934 FIFA World Cup. He also played for Zamalek, and represented Egypt at the 1936 Summer Olympics.

== International career ==
He represented Egypt in the 1934 FIFA World Cup and 1936 Summer Olympics.

== Honors ==
Tersana

- Sultan Hussein Cup: 1930

Zamalek

- Egypt Cup: 1931–32, 1934–35, 1937–38
- Cairo League: 1931–32, 1933–34
- King Fouad Cup: 1933–34
