= Mahmoud Hafez =

Egyptian footballer (1918–1989)

Zoklot
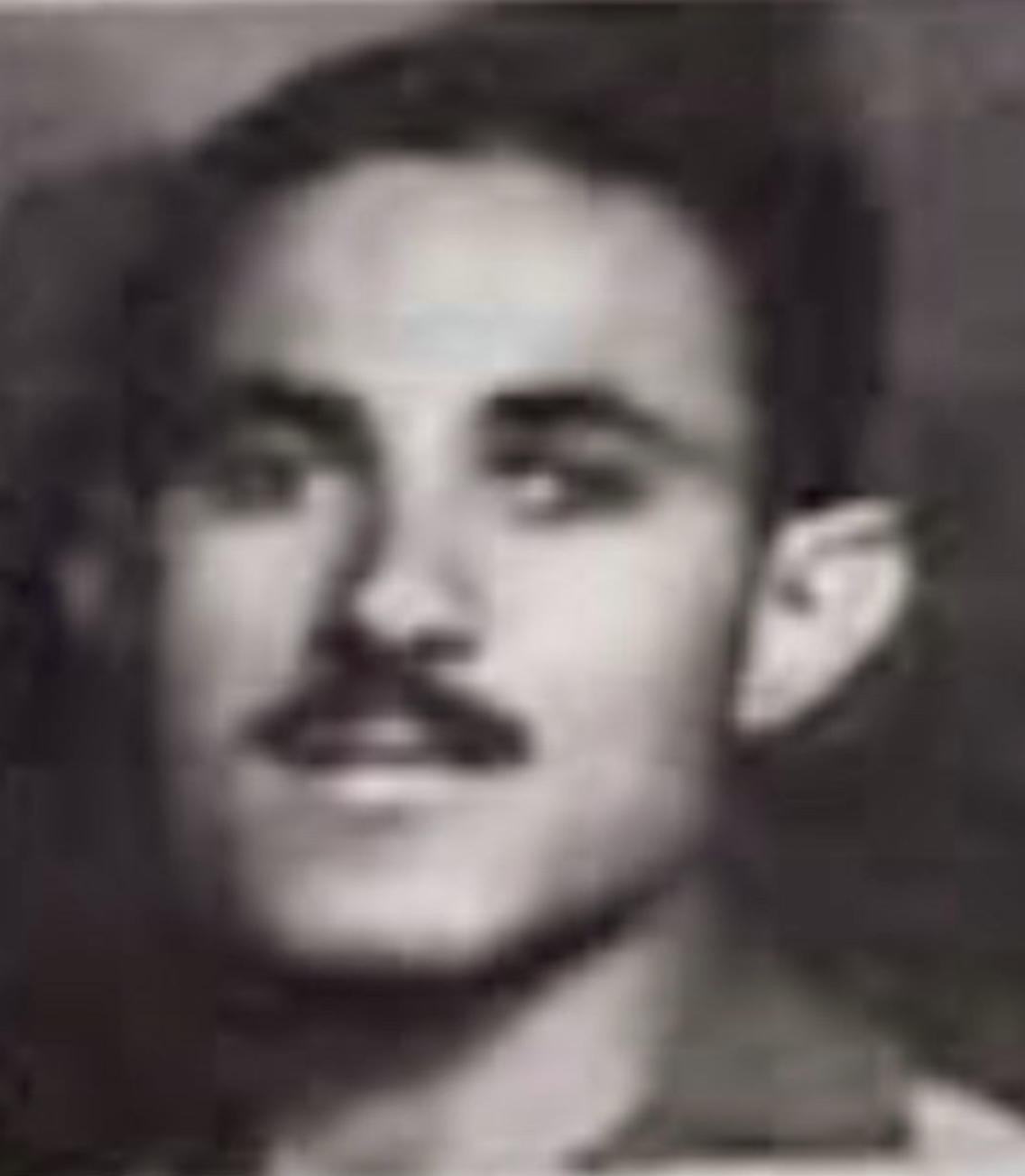
- Zoklot with Zamalek in 1944

Personal information
- Full name: Mahmoud Hafez
- Date of birth: 10 August 1918
- Place of birth: Cairo, Egypt
- Date of death: 2 May 1989 (aged 70)
- Place of death: Cairo, Egypt
- Height: 1.76 m (5 ft 9 in)
- Position: Winger

Senior career*
Years	Team	Apps	(Gls)
1936-1938	Tersana		
1938–1951	Zamalek		

International career
1942-1948	Egypt		
- * Club domestic league appearances and goals

Mahmoud Hafez (Arabic: ;محمود حافظ 10 August 1918 – 2 May 1989) commonly known as Zoklot (Arabic: زقلط), was an Egyptian professional footballer. He played for El-Zamalek and Egypt. He was also a fighter pilot in the Egyptian Air Force.

== Biography ==
Zoklot was born on 10 August 1918 in Cairo. He started his professional career in 1936 with Tersana. In 1938, he moved to Zamalek, and spent the rest of his career with the Cairo giants. He won with Zamalek 1938 Egypt Cup in his first season with the team. He also won with the White Castle the 1939–40 Cairo League followed 1940–41 Cairo League and the 1941 Egypt Cup. Zoklot is mostly known for his famous hat-trick against Al Ahly in the Cairo derby which took place in the 1944 Egypt Cup final. This was the highest scoring result in the history of the derby to date. Zoklot won with Zamalek the Cairo League for six times and three titles of the Egypt Cup. He played for the Egypt national football team in the 1948 Olympics in London. He retired in 1951.

Zoklot was a military officer, he graduated from the Egyptian Air College and worked as a fighter pilot in the Egyptian Air Force. He retired as a Brigadier general. Zoklot was the pilot who flew over Zamalek Stadium in its official opening in 1959. Besides his military career, Zoklot worked in Zamalek after retirement from football. He started his sports management career as a Sports director, then football director. He also held the post of the Club managing director. In 1971, Zoklot was elected as Zamalek's board member.

== Honours ==
=== Player ===
Zamalek

- Egypt Cup: 1938, 1941, 1943, 1944
- Cairo League: 1939–40, 1940–41, 1943–44, 1944–45, 1945–46, 1946–47, 1948–49, 1950–51
- King's Cup: 1941

== See also ==
- Football in Egypt
