= APA Distinguished Scientific Award for an Early Career Contribution to Psychology =

Annual award given by the American Psychological Association

The Distinguished Scientific Award for an Early Career Contribution to Psychology is an annual award that has been given by the American Psychological Association since 1974. It is given to outstanding research psychologists who are in the early stages of their career, defined as the first nine years after they receive their Ph.D. Every year, the award is given to five psychologists, each from one of ten different areas of psychology:

1. Animal learning and comparative psychology,
2. Developmental psychology,
3. Health psychology,
4. Cognitive psychology,
5. Psychopathology,
6. Behavioral and cognitive neuroscience,
7. Perception and motor control,
8. Social psychology,
9. Applied psychology, and
10. Individual differences.

This means that every two years, one psychologist from each area will receive the award.

== Notable past winners ==
Former winners of the Distinguished Scientific Award for an Early Career Contribution to Psychology include:

- David M. Buss (1989, personality)
- Michael S. Fanselow (1985, animal learning and behavior)
- Martha Farah (1992, perception/motor performance)
- Baruch Fischhoff (1980, methodological)
- Angela Grippo (2012, health)

== See also ==
- List of psychology awards
