= 1937–38 Egypt Cup =

Tournament details
- Country: Egypt

Final positions
- Champions: Zamalek (4th title)
- Runners-up: Al Ahly

The 1937–38 Egypt Cup was the 16th edition of the Egypt Cup.

The final was held on 14 May 1938. The match was contested by Al Ahly and Zamalek, with the first match ended in a 1–1 draw, a replay was played on 2 December 1938 which Zamalek won 1–0.

== Quarter-finals ==
Team 1	Score	Team 2
Zamalek	2–0	Al Ittihad Alexandria
Teram	2–0	Olympic Club
Al Masry	2–2	El Sekka El Hadid
Al Ahly	0–0	Cairo Police

- Replays

Team 1	Score	Team 2
El Sekka El Hadid	2–0	Al Masry
Cairo Police	0–0	Al Ahly
Al Ahly	2–1	Cairo Police

== Semi-finals ==
Team 1	Score	Team 2
Zamalek	2–0	Teram
Al Ahly	3–2	El Sekka El Hadid

== Final ==
14 May 1938

Zamalek	1–1	Al Ahly
Hussein Labib 30'	Report	Hassan El-Far 87' (o.g.)

Referee: Mohamed Fouad Hafez

=== Replay ===
2 December 1938

Zamalek	1–0	Al-Ahly
Hussein El-Far 30' (o.g.)	Report

Referee: Mohamed Fouad Hafez

Egypt Cup 1937-1938 Winners
Zamalek
4th title
