= Hafez Kasseb =

Egyptian footballer

Personal information
- Place of birth: Egypt
- Position: Midfielder

Senior career*
Years	Team	Apps	(Gls)
- El-Olympi
- Zamalek

International career
- Egypt
- * Club domestic league appearances and goals

Hafez Kasseb (date of birth and death unknown) was an Egyptian football midfielder who played for Egypt in the 1934 FIFA World Cup. He also played for El-Olympi and Zamalek. Kasseb is deceased.
