= Germano (footballer, born 1911) =

Brazilian footballer

Personal information
- Full name: Germano Boettcher Sobrinho
- Date of birth: 14 March 1911
- Place of birth: Rio de Janeiro, Brazil
- Date of death: 9 June 1977 (aged 66)
- Position: Goalkeeper

Senior career*
Years	Team	Apps	(Gls)
1928–1935	Botafogo		

International career
1934	Brazil	3	(0)
- * Club domestic league appearances and goals

Germano Boettcher Sobrinho (14 March 1911 – 9 June 1977), known as just Germano, was a Brazilian football player. He has played for the Brazil national team.
