= Ariel Nogueira =

Brazilian footballer

Personal information
- Full name: Ariel Augusto Nogueira
- Date of birth: 22 February 1910
- Place of birth: Petrópolis, Brazil
- Date of death: 1 August 2005 (aged 95)
- Position: Defender

Senior career*
Years	Team	Apps	(Gls)
1927	Hellênico		
1927–1929	Petropolitano		
1929–1934	Botafogo		

International career
- Brazil
- * Club domestic league appearances and goals

Ariel Augusto Nogueira (born 22 February 1910 – 1 August 2005) was a Brazilian football player. He played for the Brazil national team.
