= Adalbert Püllöck =

Romanian footballer

Personal information
- Date of birth: 6 January 1907
- Place of birth: Austria-Hungary
- Date of death: 7 December 1977 (aged 70)
- Position: Goalkeeper

Senior career*
Years	Team	Apps	(Gls)
1931–1935	Crişana Oradea		

International career
1932–1934	Romania	4	(0)
- * Club domestic league appearances and goals

Adalbert Püllöck (6 January 1907 – 7 December 1977) was a Romanian footballer who played as a goalkeeper. He was born in Austria-Hungary (today Romania).

== Biography ==
At club level, he played in Liga I for Crişana Oradea.

With the Romania national football team, he was picked by joint coaches Josef Uridil and Costel Rădulescu to play in the 1934 World Cup in Italy. The team were eliminated in the first round of this competition after a 3–2 defeat to Czechoslovakia.

== Notes and references ==
- Evidence of Adalbert Püllöck's caps for Romania national football team
- Adalbert Püllöck at National-Football-Teams.com
