= Severino Albarracín =

Spanish anarchist

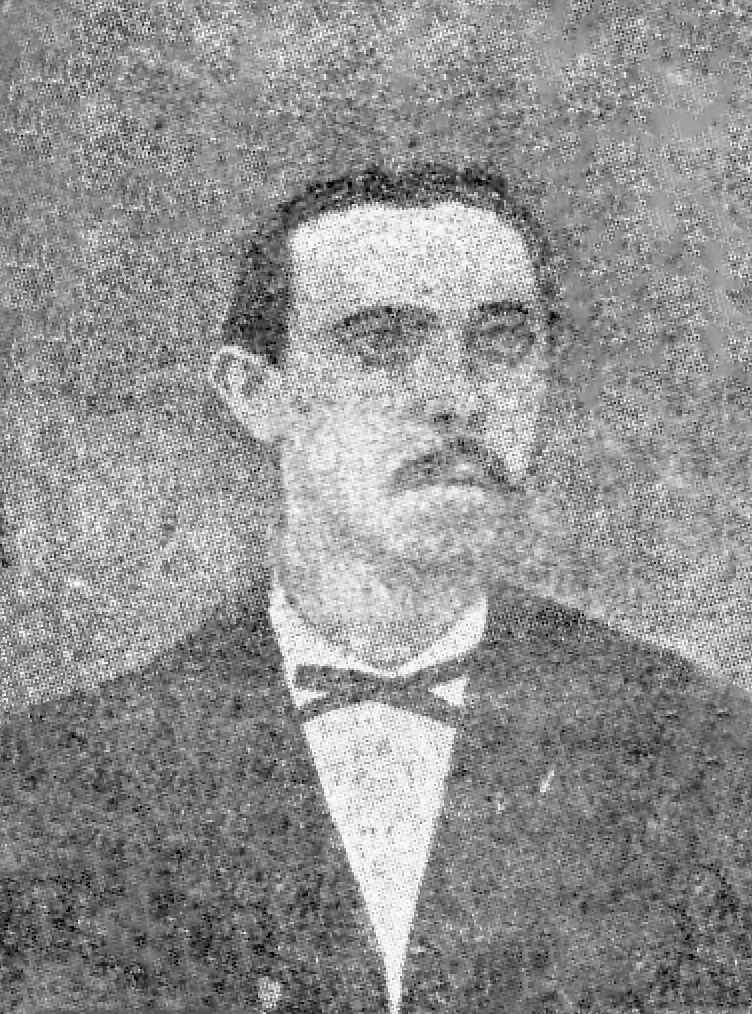
- Born: 1851; Llíria
- Died: February 5, 1878 (aged 26–27); Barcelona

Severino Albarracín Broseta (1851– February 5, 1878) was a Spanish anarchist. Trained as a teacher, he became a leader of the Spanish Regional Federation of the First International and was a prominent participant in the 1873 Petroleum Revolution general strike in Alcoy. Exiled in Switzerland, he participated in the Jura Federation, where he remained an insurrectionist while working as a laborer. He returned to Spain after several years, where he died of tuberculosis.

== Life ==
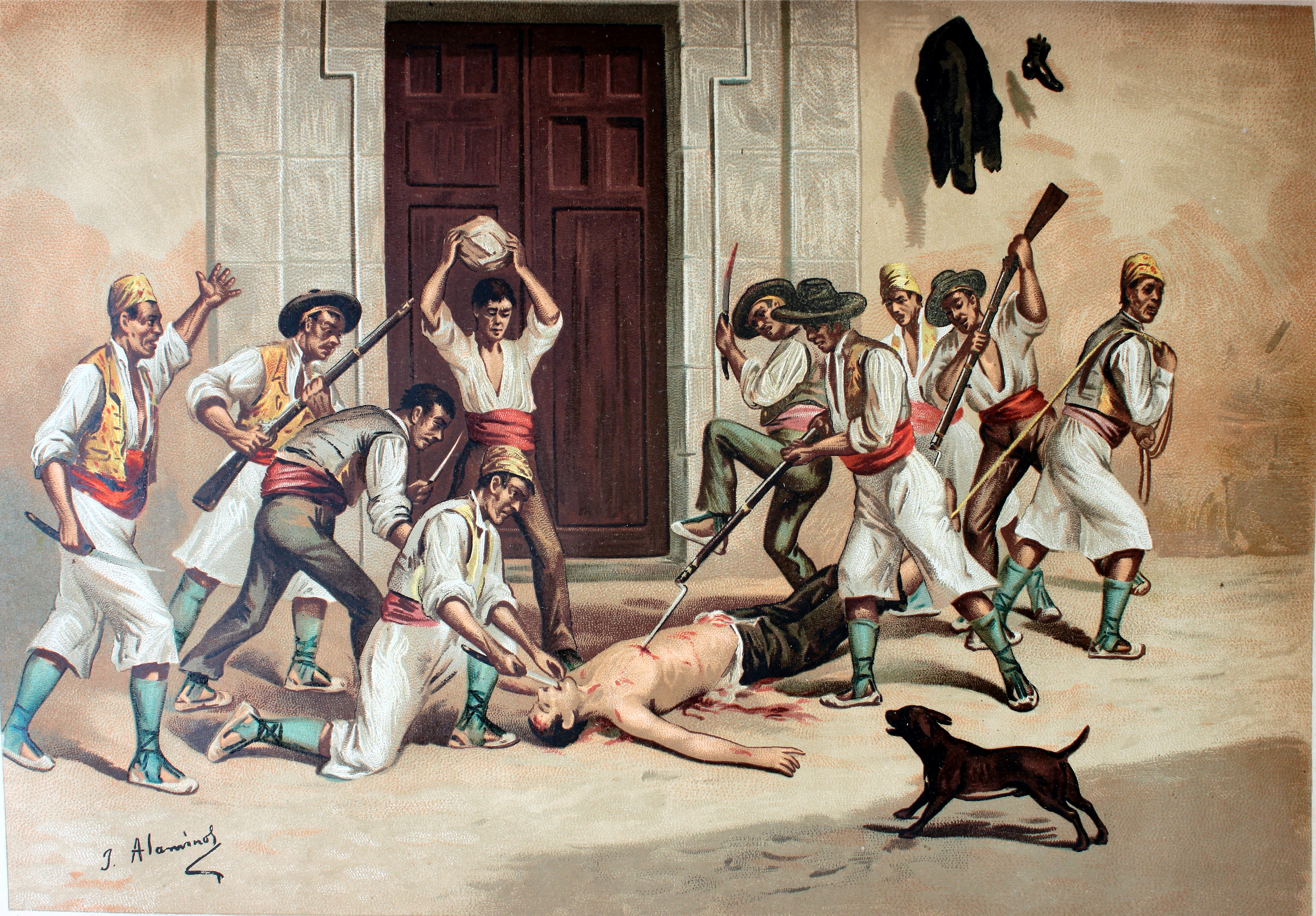
Illustration of the death of Alcoy mayor Agustí Albors during the Petroleum Revolution

Severino Albarracín Broseta was born in 1851 in Llíria, near Valencia, Spain. In his early years, following the 1868 Glorious Revolution, Albarracín joined the leftist Republican Youth of Valencia. He became a teacher after studying at the Valencia Normal School. Around 1871, Albarracín joined the First International and Bakunin's International Alliance of Socialist Democracy. He was an anarchist Spanish Regional Federation delegate to the International's 1872 Zaragoza Congress. The same year, was elected to the Regional's Federal Council and, later, was appointed its secretary, based in Alcoy. He attended the 1873 Córdoba Congress.

By this time, Albarracín supported insurrectionism and social revolution through local uprisings. He was a prominent participant in the July 1873 Petroleum Revolution general strike in Alcoy. Albarracín and others of the International demanded that the mayor transfer power to a revolutionary junta. He was arrested in association with the uprising and the next year was arrested in association with writing a First International manifesto. He gave a false name to sabotage his prosecution. Upon his release, he absconded to Switzerland. He participated in the Jura Federation, meeting Peter Kropotkin, James Guillaume, and Paul Brousse during his exile. Albarracín remained an insurrectionist in the Spanish Regional's most radical faction. He worked in an engravers cooperative in Le Locle and then for the communard Abraham Dargère. While named a Spanish delegate to the 1876 Bern Congress, Albarracín did not attend. Under the name Gabriel Albagès, Albarracín was twice elected to the International's federal council that year but stepped down to work as a painter plasterer in La Chaux-de-Fonds.

After an aborted attempt to translate Guillaume's Historical Sketches into Spanish and not finding other work, Albarracín returned to Spain in 1877. He continued his activism in Barcelona and kept a correspondence with Kropotkin. Albarracín died in Barcelona on February 5, 1878, of tuberculosis.

== Legacy ==
A street in Alcoy was named in his memory.
