= Tom Lynch (soccer) =

American soccer player

Personal information
- Full name: Thomas Lynch
- Place of birth: United States
- Position: Midfielder

International career
Years	Team	Apps	(Gls)
- United States

Thomas Lynch was an American soccer midfielder who was a member of the U.S. national team at the 1934 FIFA World Cup. He was born in Fall River, Massachusetts.

In 1934, Lynch was called into the U.S. team for the 1934 FIFA World Cup. However, he did not enter the lone U.S. game of the tournament, a 7–1 loss to eventual champion Italy.

Lynch played professionally in the American Soccer League, being listed with Brooklyn Celtic during the World Cup. In 1935, he was with the New York Americans.

Lynch is deceased.
