= Josef Hassmann =

Austrian footballer

Personal information
- Date of birth: 21 May 1910
- Place of birth: Austria-Hungary
- Date of death: 1 September 1969 (aged 59)
- Position: Forward

Senior career*
Years	Team	Apps	(Gls)
1926–1931	FC Admira Wacker Mödling		
1931–1937	FC Vienne		
1937–1941	Team Wiener Linien		
1941–1943	SK Rapid Wien		
1945	Team Wiener Linien		

International career
1934–1935	Austria	2	(0)
- * Club domestic league appearances and goals

Josef Hassmann (21 May 1910 – 1 September 1969) was an Austrian football forward who played for Austria in the 1934 FIFA World Cup. He also played for FC Admira Wacker Mödling, FC Vienne, Team Wiener Linien, and SK Rapid Wien.
