= Stanislau Konrad =

Romanian footballer

Personal information
- Date of birth: 23 October 1913
- Place of birth: Poland
- Date of death: 2 February 2000 (aged 86)
- Position: Goalkeeper

Senior career*
Years	Team	Apps	(Gls)
- CA Timişoara
1940–1950	UD Reșița		

International career
1947	Romania	1	(-3)
- * Club domestic league appearances and goals

Stanislau Konrad (Polish: Stanisław Konrad) (23 October 1913 - 2 February 2000) was a Romanian football goalkeeper who played for Romania national football team.

== International career ==
His only cap with Romania was on 22 June 1947 against Yugoslavia. He conceded 3 goals as Romania lost 3-1.

== Death ==
He died on 2 February 2000 aged 86.
