= Felipe Pascucci =

Italian football manager

Personal information
- Date of birth: 24 June 1907
- Place of birth: Genoa, Italy
- Date of death: 18 December 1966 (aged 59)

Managerial career
- Years: Team
- 1933: Club Atlético River Plate
- 1934: Argentina

Felipe Pascucci (Genoa, 24 June 1907 – 18 December 1966) was an Italian football manager who coached Argentina in the 1934 FIFA World Cup. He also coached Club Atlético River Plate. Until today, he remains the only non-Argentine to coach Argentina and the youngest coach ever at the World Cup, being just 26 years, 11 months, and 3 days when Argentina played the first match against Sweden.
