= Octacílio =

Brazilian footballer

Octacílio Pinheiro Guerra
Personal information
- Full name: Octacílio Pinheiro Guerra
- Date of birth: 21 November 1909
- Place of birth: Porto Alegre, Brazil
- Date of death: 26 February 1967 (aged 57)
- Position: Defender

Senior career*
Years	Team	Apps	(Gls)
1920–1924	Rio Grande		
1925–1937	Botafogo		
- * Club domestic league appearances and goals

Octacílio Pinheiro Guerra (21 November 1909 – 26 February 1967) was a Brazilian football player. He played for Brazil national team.
