= Adriano Chimento =

Italian jeweller and businessman

Adriano Chimento is an Italian jeweller and businessman, the founder and president of the Chimento jewellery company.

In 1946, Adriano Chimento founded Chimento in 1964 in Grisignano di Zocco, in the Italian province of Vicenza.

Adriano Chimento has been named in the Panama Papers.
