= Mohammed Bakhati =

Egyptian footballer

Personal information
- Place of birth: Egypt
- Position: Midfielder

Senior career*
Years	Team	Apps	(Gls)
- Zamalek SC

International career
- Egypt
- * Club domestic league appearances and goals

Mohammed Farid Bakhati (date of birth and death unknowns) was an Egyptian football midfielder who played for Egypt in the 1934 FIFA World Cup. He also played for Zamalek SC. Bakhati is deceased.
