= Renato Bizzozero =

Swiss footballer (1912–1994)

Personal information
- Date of birth: 7 September 1912
- Place of birth: Lugano, Switzerland
- Date of death: 10 November 1994 (aged 82)
- Place of death: Buenos Aires, Argentina
- Position: Goalkeeper

Senior career*
Years	Team	Apps	(Gls)
1934–1939	FC Lugano	17	(0)

International career
1935–1938	Switzerland	19	(0)
- * Club domestic league appearances and goals

Renato Bizzozero (7 September 1912 – 10 November 1994) was a Swiss football goalkeeper who was an unused squad member for Switzerland in the FIFA World Cup in 1934 and 1938. Though he received nineteen caps, he was only ever used by FC Lugano as a reserve goalkeeper.
