= Adolf Šimperský =

Czech footballer

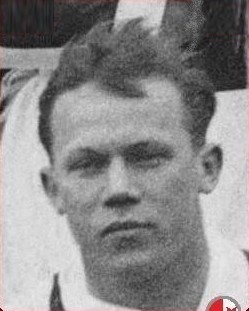
- Adolf Šimperský before 1942.

Personal information
- Date of birth: 5 August 1909
- Place of birth: Břevnov, Austria-Hungary
- Date of death: 15 February 1964 (aged 54)
- Place of death: Czechoslovakia
- Position: Midfielder

Youth career
- Březnice

Senior career*
Years	Team	Apps	(Gls)
1927–1936	SK Slavia Praha		
1937–1938	SK Slezská Ostrava		

International career
1930–1933	Czechoslovakia	10	(0)
Medal record
Representing Czechoslovakia
Men's Football
FIFA World Cup
Runner-up	1934 Italy
- * Club domestic league appearances and goals

Adolf Šimperský (5 August 1909 in Břevnov – 15 February 1964) is a former Czechoslovak football player who played mostly for SK Slavia Praha.

He played ten matches for the Czechoslovakia national team and was a participant at the 1934 FIFA World Cup.

== Biography ==
He started his professional career in 1927 with Prague's Slavia, where he played for nine seasons, contributing to the team's seven Czechoslovak championship titles. Šimperský appeared in a total of 338 matches for Slavia, scoring 11 goals.

On the international stage, Šimperský made his debut for the Czechoslovak national team in 1930, and over five years, he earned 10 caps. He was part of the squad that secured a silver medal at the 1934 FIFA World Cup in Italy, although he did not play in any matches during the tournament.

Šimperský's club success and involvement with the national team underscore his contributions to Czechoslovak football during his career.

Šimperský died in 1964 at the age of 54.
