= Angela Grippo =

American neuroscientist and health psychologist

- Education: Drake University, University of Iowa
- Awards: APA Distinguished Scientific Award for an Early Career Contribution to Psychology (2012)
- Scientific career
- Fields: Neuroscience
- Workplaces: Northern Illinois University

Angela J. Grippo is an American neuroscientist and health psychologist known for her research on stress, mood disorders, and cardiovascular disease. She is an associate professor of psychology at Northern Illinois University.

Grippo received the 2012 American Psychological Association Distinguished Scientific Award for an Early Career Contribution to Psychology in the area of health psychology. Her award citation emphasized "her creative contributions in investigating the association between depression and cardiovascular disease in preclinical animal models... [that] advance understanding of the connections among depression, stress, and physical disease in humans."

In addition to her award-winning research program, Grippo writes popular articles to help people better understand themselves and their circumstances. Her article "Why Reveal Your Disability or ‘Hidden Identity’ at Work?" encourages people to remain open about their disabilities, such as dyslexia. She embraces the ideas of individuality and self assurance. She and her colleague Joseph Magiano write a column for Psychology Today titled The Wide Wide World of Psychology. Grippo's articles emphasize brain-body interactions, stress, and health issues.

== Biography ==
Grippo grew up in Park Ridge, Illinois. She decided to go to college because it allowed for more flexible options in careers. This decision came from a childhood experience of Grippo volunteering with her friends as a breakfast server at 10 years old. She complained to her parents later that day that the customers were unpleasant and challenging. Therefore, she decided that she didn't want to work in the food service industry causing her parents to discuss with her the choice of going to college.

She received her Bachelors of Science degree from Drake University in 1998. She went to graduate school at University of Iowa where she obtained an MA in 2000, and a PhD in Behavioral Neuroscience in 2003, under the supervision of Alan Kim Johnson. Her dissertation used a rodent model to explore neurobiological mechanisms associated with heart disease.

After a one-year postdoctoral fellowship at Loyola University Medical Center (2003-2004), Grippo took a second postdoctoral position at the University of Illinois at Chicago (2004-2008). During her second postdoc, Grippo studied neuroendocrine functioning in relation to social behavior in prairie vole. Grippo joined the faculty of the Department of Psychology at Northern Illinois University in 2008. Her research has been supported by grants from the National Institutes of Health. She has served as Chair of the Women in Physiology Committee of the American Physiological Society. She frequently teaches Introduction to Brain and Behavior, Drugs and Behavior, Biopsychology, and Studies in Experimental Psychology, Social Neuroscience.

== Research ==
Grippo uses animal models to identify significant associations between stress, mood, and cardiovascular dysregulation. Several of her studies have used rats to explore how mood influences autonomic nervous system activity and immune response, and its potential impact on cardiovascular functioning. In one of her studies with Sprague−Dawley rats, exposure to unpredictable stress led to anhedonia, operationally defined as a reduction in the animal's intake of sucrose without any associated change in its intake of water and used as an indicator of depression in the animal model. Of potential clinical relevance, the researchers identified links between the occurrence of anhedonia and significant changes in levels of cytokine and stress hormones (e.g., corticosterone) in the rats' blood plasma.

Grippo and her colleagues have also conducted research on social isolation in relation to anxiety and depression in prairie vole, and associated disturbances in neuroendocrine activation that may be of clinical importance for understanding cardiovascular complications associated with stress. One of her studies investigated the hypothesis that social and environmental stressors, including long term social isolation, may alter the expression of gap junction proteins, Connexin 43 and Connexin 45. These proteins, located in the heart, play an important role in cardiac rhythmicity and intercellular communication. In this study, socially isolated prairie voles exhibited depressive behavior as compared to a control group (living in pairs). Social isolation was also found to alter the expression of Connexin 43 in the left ventricle of the heart, thus elucidating possible cellular mechanisms underlying altered cardiac rhythmicity in response to stress.

== Representative publications ==
- Grippo, A. J., Francis, J., Beltz, T. G., Felder, R. B., & Johnson, A. K. (2005). Neuroendocrine and cytokine profile of chronic mild stress-induced anhedonia. Physiology & Behavior, 84(5), 697–706.
- Grippo, A. J., Gerena, D., Huang, J., Kumar, N., Shah, M., Ughreja, R., & Carter, C. S. (2007). Social isolation induces behavioral and neuroendocrine disturbances relevant to depression in female and male prairie voles. Psychoneuroendocrinology, 32(8-10), 966–980.
- Grippo, A. J., & Johnson, A. K. (2002). Biological mechanisms in the relationship between depression and heart disease. Neuroscience & Biobehavioral Reviews, 26(8), 941–962.
- Grippo, A. J., & Johnson, A. K. (2009). Stress, depression and cardiovascular dysregulation: a review of neurobiological mechanisms and the integration of research from preclinical disease models. Stress, 12(1), 1-21.
- Grippo, A. J., Trahanas, D. M., Zimmerman II, R. R., Porges, S. W., & Carter, C. S. (2009). Oxytocin protects against negative behavioral and autonomic consequences of long-term social isolation. Psychoneuroendocrinology, 34(10), 1542–1553.
