= István Tamássy =

Hungarian footballer (1910–1994)

Personal information
- Date of birth: 4 November 1910
- Place of birth: Budapest, Hungary
- Date of death: 30 May 1994 (aged 83)
- Position: Forward

Senior career*
Years	Team	Apps	(Gls)
- Újpest FC

International career
1934	Hungary	2	(0)
- * Club domestic league appearances and goals

István Tamássy (4 November 1910 – 30 May 1994) was a Hungarian footballer who played as a forward for Újpest FC. He made two appearances for the Hungary national team, participating in the 1934 FIFA World Cup.
