= Friedrich Weichelt =

German explosives engineer

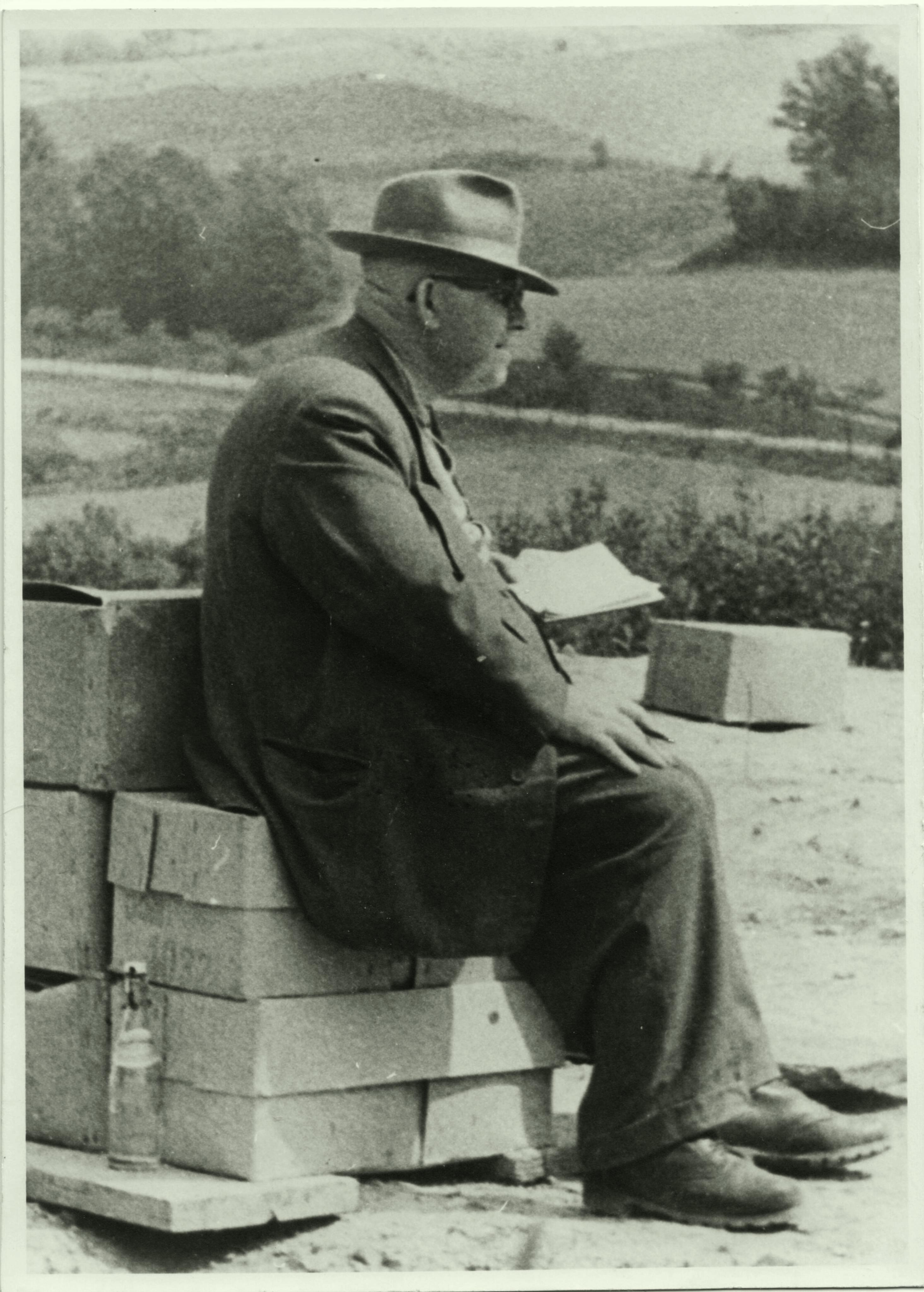
- Friedrich Weichelt 1959
- Born: December 1894; Döbeln, Saxony, Germany
- Died: November 1961 (aged 66); Dresden, East Germany
- Occupations: Explosives engineer Educator; Writer

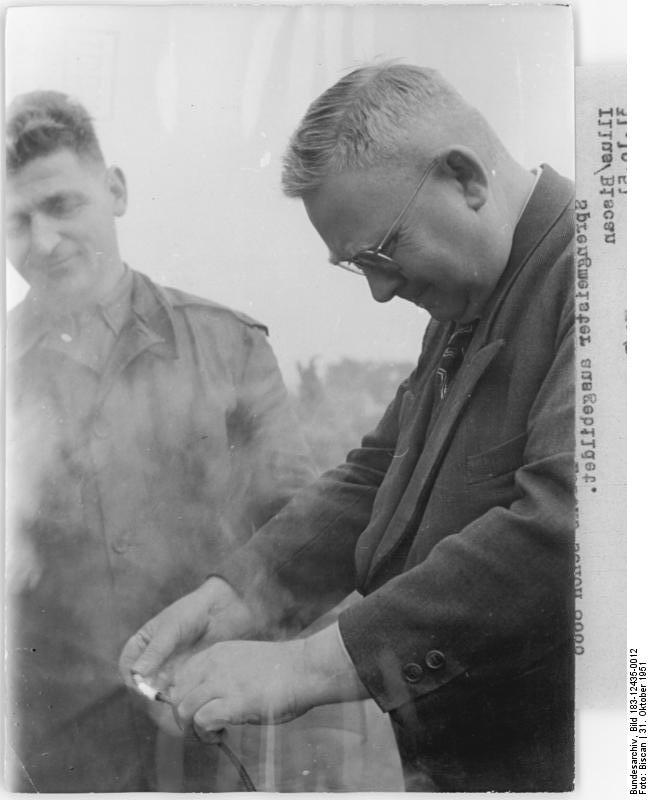
Friedrich Weichelt checking a fuse October 1951

Friedrich Weichelt (December 1894 – November 1961) was a leading German explosives engineer. He came to wider prominence on account of his training work and on account of various practical publications that he produced. After the end of the Second World War he began a long association with the newly established Dresden Explosives Academy, where he taught till his death in 1961.

== Life ==
Friedrich Weichelt was born, the son of a blasting contractor, in Döbeln, a small town a short distance to the west of Dresden in Saxony. He was educated to secondary level in the local schools and then went on to study at the Technical Engineering Academy in Dresden. Following his education he undertook a succession of practical internships, gaining experience of potash mining, stone quarrying, deep boring and tunnel blasting.

A period of further informal professional training in the family business followed, after which he undertook a period of study in engineering. In 1924 he set himself up as a self-employed explosives engineer working for various manufacturers of explosives and ignition devices in the region (which has a long history of mining). He also acquired specialist knowledge in agricultural applications of explosives technology. This experience was later applied to opening up planting holes for large plants and small trees, so as to facilitate root penetration into the ground and to improve drainage by break up water-blocking substrata.

In order to address a shortage, exacerbated by the slaughter of the First World War, of suitably qualified experts, Weichelt started to organise training courses on explosives technology, hoping to communicate his own expertise and experience to a new generation. In due course this was backed by a system of examinations and the issuance of state qualifications provided by experts employed by local ministerial departments for labour and the economy in the relevant regions.

From 1934 he was also employed part-time by research institutes and on expert committees on open mine blasting at the Freiberg University of Mining and Technology, bringing to the work his expertise on producing and using explosives and detonation devices. From 1941 he worked at the Siegen Mining Academy as a lecturer on explosives technology. He also contributed articles and commentaries to specialist publications. He communicated his own research results and experience-based knowledge on a range of blasting operations in training sessions and on day courses. He passed on his theoretical and practical knowledge in "masterclasses" provided for the "German Research Institute for Rocks and soil" ("Deutschen Forschungsinstitutes für Steine und Erden") at Köthen. In 1934 he published a pocket book for explosives technicians as a guide for workers in the sector. This formed the basis for an expanded version which in the end extended to three volumes and became a standard work for blasting contractors, technicians and engineers. This "textbook" remains a standard guide for the sector and is regularly updated. It covers matters such as the variables to be identified and applied when computing quantities of explosive, how to handle explosives and detonators, general safety requirements and other legal provisions.

After the war ended, formally in May 1945, Saxony found itself administered as part of the Soviet occupation zone, which four and a half years, in October 1949, was relaunched as the Soviet sponsored German Democratic Republic (East Germany). Weichelt stayed in East Germany. There was now a huge amount of work for explosives engineers due to the destructive aerial bombing attacks on cities and industrial facilities during the latter part of the war, and the resulting need to clear away the remnants of the ruined structures and the rubble before rebuilding could be contemplated. In 1946 Weichelt resumed training in explosives technology at Halle, where he was based till 1948. Regular educational courses were now established under the leadership of Friedrich Weichelt at the "German Research Institute for Rocks and soil" ("Deutschen Forschungsinstitutes für Steine und Erden") in Köthen. With the launch of the first regular courses in explosives technology a firmer differentiation was applied between blasting above ground and blasting below ground. Early in the 1950s Weichert moved the focus of his teaching activity to Dresden, which remained his base till he died in 1961.

In 1950 an expanded version of his textbook appeared with the title "Handbuch der gewerblichen Sprengtechnik für Sprengmeister, Techniker und Ingenieure in der Industrie der Steine und Erden, im Baugewerbe und Brunnenbau, in der Forst- und Landwirtschaft" ("Handbook of Commercial Blasting Technology for blasting team leaders technicians and engineers, in the soil and rock industries, building construction and well drilling, forestry and agriculture "). Frequently revised and republished subsequently, the work continues to provide a basis for training in the explosives sector. Reflecting the needs of the time, the basic training courses which he continued to provide focused in particular with then involvement of blasting technology in the context of clearing ruined buildings and rubble.

In what became East Germany, Friedrich Weichelt was responsible as the senior explosives engineer in respect of several of the largest postwar construction projects, including the following:

- Rubble clearance in large cities including Berlin, Magdeburg and Dresden
- Construction of the Rappbode Dam
- Construction of the Rostock Harbour
