= Joseph Van Ingelgem =

Belgian footballer

Personal information
- Full name: Joseph van Ingelgem
- Date of birth: 23 January 1912
- Place of birth: Jette (Belgium)
- Date of death: 29 May 1989 (aged 77)
- Position: Defender

Senior career*
Years	Team	Apps	(Gls)
1929–1942	Daring Club Bruxelles		

International career
1932–1934	Belgium	11	(0)
- * Club domestic league appearances and goals

Joseph "Jos" Van Ingelgem (23 January 1912 – 29 May 1989) was a Belgian footballer. He was a defender for Daring Club Bruxelles, where he was also picked for Belgium in 1932. He played eleven times for the Diables Rouges, until 1934.

== Honours ==
- Belgian international from 1932 to 1934 (11 caps)
- Picked for the 1934 World Cup (did not play)
- Champion of Belgium in 1936 and 1937 with Daring Club Bruxelles
