= Anton Janda =

Austrian footballer

Personal information
- Date of birth: 1 May 1904
- Place of birth: Austria-Hungary
- Date of death: 26 September 1985 (aged 81)
- Position: Defender

Senior career*
Years	Team	Apps	(Gls)
1924–1935	SK Admira Wien		
1935-1940	SC Austro Fiat		
1940-1946	SR Donaufeld		
1946-1947	SV Austria Salzburg		
1947-1948	FC Zell am See		
1948	HSV Wien		

International career
1928–1934	Austria	10	(0)
- * Club domestic league appearances and goals

Anton Janda (1 May 1904 – 26 September 1985) was an Austrian football defender who was part of Austria's squad in the 1934 FIFA World Cup. He also played for FC Admira Wacker Mödling.

== International career ==
He played 10 matches with Austria between 1928 and 1934. He was part of Austria squad for the 1934 FIFA World Cup but did not play any match of the tournament.

== Coaching career ==
After his playing career he became coach of SC Austro Fiat Vienna. After the Second World War he coached FC Zell am See, SV Austria Salzburg in the Salzburg province, Heiligenstädter SV and Austria XIII in Vienna.

== Death ==
He died on 26 September 1985 aged 81.
