= Jaap Mol =

Dutch footballer

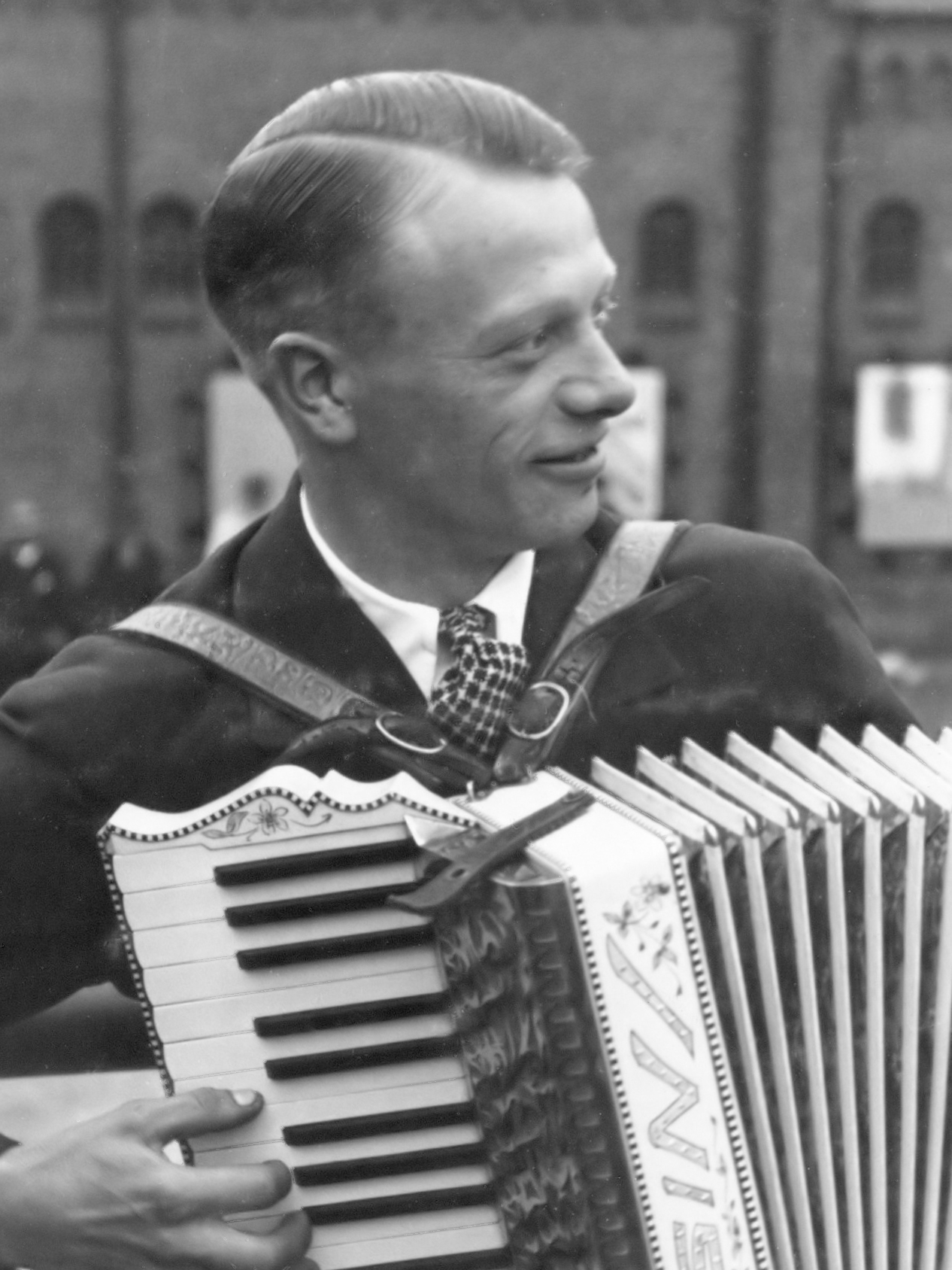
- Jaap Mol (1934)

Personal information
- Date of birth: 3 February 1912
- Place of birth: Koog aan de Zaan, Netherlands
- Date of death: 9 December 1972 (aged 60)
- Position: Forward

Senior career*
Years	Team	Apps	(Gls)
1928–1936	KFC		
1936–1937	DWS		
1937–1938	RKAV Amstelveen		
1938–1941	ZFC		

International career
1931–1934	Netherlands	5	(1)
- * Club domestic league appearances and goals

Jacob Mol (3 February 1912 – 9 December 1972) was a Dutch football forward who was selected for the Netherlands in the 1934 FIFA World Cup. He also played for KFC, DWS, RKAV Amstelveen and ZFC.
