= Tunga (footballer) =

Brazilian footballer (1908–?)

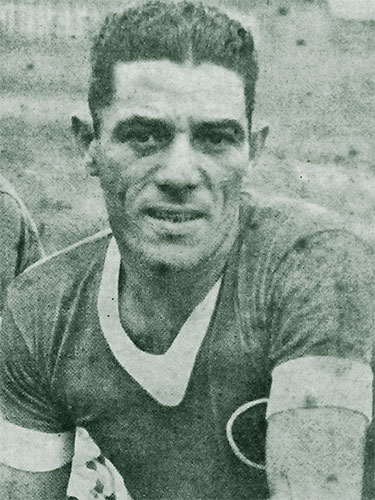

Personal information
- Full name: Sebastião Couto
- Date of birth: 17 December 1908
- Place of birth: Bananal, Brazil
- Position: Midfielder

Senior career*
Years	Team	Apps	(Gls)
- Palmeiras

International career
1937	Brazil	5	(0)
- * Club domestic league appearances and goals

Sebastião Couto (born 17 December 1908, date of death unknown), known as Tunga, was a Brazilian footballer who played as a midfielder for Palmeiras. He made five appearances for the Brazil national team in 1937. He was part of Brazil's squad for the 1937 South American Championship.
