= Yacout El-Soury =

Egyptian footballer (died 1987)

Personal information
- Full name: Gaber Yacout El-Soury
- Place of birth: Egypt
- Date of death: 2 July 1987
- Position: Defender

International career
Years	Team	Apps	(Gls)
- Egypt

Gaber Yacout El-Soury (Arabic: جَابِر يَاقُوت الصُّورِيّ; died 2 July 1987) was an Egyptian football defender who played for Egypt in the 1934 FIFA World Cup. He also competed in the men's tournament at the 1928 Summer Olympics.
