= Antonín Vodička =

Czech footballer

Personal information
- Date of birth: 1 March 1907
- Place of birth: Vršovice, Austria-Hungary
- Date of death: 9 August 1975 (aged 68)
- Place of death: Czechoslovakia
- Position: Midfielder

Youth career
- 1920–1923: Staroměstský SK Olympia
- 1923: Union Žižkov
- 1923–1925: Staroměstský SK Olympia

Senior career*
Years	Team	Apps	(Gls)
1925–1938	Slavia Prague	163	(3)
1938–	Hvězda Košíře		

International career
1926–1937	Czechoslovakia	18	(0)
Medal record
Representing Czechoslovakia
Men's Football
FIFA World Cup
Runner-up	1934 Italy
- * Club domestic league appearances and goals

Antonín Vodička (1 March 1907 – 9 August 1975) was a Czech football player.

He played club football for SK Slavia Praha.

He played 18 matches for the Czechoslovakia national team and was a participant at the 1934 FIFA World Cup.
