= Victor Putmans =

Belgian footballer

Personal information
- Full name: Victor Jean Ghislain Putmans
- Date of birth: 29 May 1914
- Place of birth: Namur, Belgium
- Date of death: 12 November 1989
- Place of death: Marchin, Belgium

Youth career
- 1927–1928: RFC Liège
- 1928–1931: Union FC Hutoise

Senior career*
Years	Team	Apps	(Gls)
1931–1936	Union FC Hutoise	123	(76)
1936–1946	Standard Liège	166	(76)
1946–1953	Union FC Hutoise	134	(23)

International career
- Belgium
- * Club domestic league appearances and goals

Victor Jean Ghislain Putmans (29 May 1914 – 12 November 1989) was a former Belgian footballer who could have played in the interwar period.

== Career ==
Putmans played for Union FC Hutoise and Standard Liège throughout his career. He was called up for the 1934 World Cup in Italy, but he did not feature in the competition.
