= Friederich Franzl =

Austrian footballer (1905–1989)

Personal information
- Date of birth: 6 March 1905
- Place of birth: Vienna, Austria-Hungary
- Date of death: 1989
- Position: Goalkeeper

Senior career*
Years	Team	Apps	(Gls)
1923–1931	FC Admira Wacker Mödling		
1931–1937	Wiener Sport-Club		

International career
1926–1931	Austria	15	(0)
- * Club domestic league appearances and goals

Friederich Franzl (6 March 1905 – 1989) was an Austrian football goalkeeper who played for Austria in the 1934 FIFA World Cup. He also played for FC Admira Wacker Mödling and Wiener Sport-Club.
