= Désiré Bourgeois =

Belgian footballer (1908-1996)

- Bourgeois with Mechelen

Personal information
- Full name: Desiderius Victor Bourgeois
- Date of birth: 13 December 1908
- Place of birth: Mechelen, Belgium
- Date of death: 29 January 1996 (aged 87)
- Position: Midfielder

Senior career*
Years	Team	Apps	(Gls)
1926–1938	RFC Malinois		

International career
1934	Belgium	2	(0)

Managerial career
- 1947–1953: RFC Malinois
- 1954–1955: RFC Malinois
- * Club domestic league appearances and goals

Desiderius "Désiré" or "Dis" Victor Bourgeois (13 December 1908 - 29 January 1996) was a Belgian footballer who was in Belgium’s squad for the 1934 FIFA World Cup.

== Biography ==
Désiré Bourgeois played for KV Mechelen (RFC malinois) from 1926 to 1940. A midfielder, he was Belgian D2 Champion in 1928 and contributed to returning Royal FC malinois to the élite.

He died on 29 January 1996 at the age of 87.

== International career ==
He played two matches for the Belgium in 1934 : on 25 February against Republic of Ireland and on 11 March against Netherlands

He was selected in the same year for the 1934 World Cup but he did not play in this compétition

== Honours ==
- Belgian D2 Champions in 1928 with FC malinois
