= Ramón Astudillo =

Argentine footballer

Personal information
- Full name: Benjamín Ramón Astudillo
- Place of birth: Argentina
- Position: Defender

Senior career*
Years	Team	Apps	(Gls)
1934-	Colón de Santa Fe		

International career
- Argentina
- * Club domestic league appearances and goals

Benjamín Ramón Astudillo is an Argentine football defender who played for Argentina in the 1934 FIFA World Cup. He also played for Colón de Santa Fe. Astudillo is deceased.
