= Herman Rapp =

German-American soccer player

Personal information
- Full name: Herman Rapp
- Date of birth: 6 December 1908
- Place of birth: Stuttgart, Germany
- Date of death: 1 May 1986 (aged 77)
- Place of death: Whiting, New Jersey, U.S.
- Position: Defender

International career
Years	Team	Apps	(Gls)
1934	United States		

Herman Rapp (6 December 1908 - May 1986) was a soccer player who played as a defender. Born in Germany, he was a member of the U.S. national team at the 1934 FIFA World Cup.

== Club career ==
In 1928, Rapp is listed with F.C. Schwaben of the International Soccer Football League of Chicago. He was then listed with the Philadelphia German-Americans of the American Soccer League during the World Cup.

== International career ==
In 1934, Rapp was called into the U.S. team for the 1934 FIFA World Cup. However, he did not enter the lone U.S. game of the tournament, a 7–1 loss to eventual champion Italy.

== Coaching ==
In 1938, Rapp was the head coach of the Schwaben. By then Schwaben competed in the National Soccer League of Chicago.
