= Grippo's =

American snack food company

Grippo's Snack Foods
- Introduced: 1919; 107 years ago
- Website: www.grippos.com
- Company
- Founded: 1919
- Headquarters: Cincinnati, Ohio, USA

Grippo's is a snack food company headquartered in Cincinnati, Ohio. Established in 1919, the company grew regionally, adding varieties of snack foods to its production. The company was founded by Angelo Grippo and originated from a one-room office on Court Street in downtown Cincinnati. Today, the business is headquartered at Colerain Avenue in Cincinnati.

== History ==
In 1919, Angelo Grippo began manufacturing rolled sugar cones. He later added traditional hand-twisted pretzels which sold for 1¢ at retailers throughout Greater Cincinnati in 1923. In 1930, Grippo invented the "loop pretzel", which resembles a tear drop shape. The effort was developed from the idea of creating a simplified pretzel shape which would be more resistant to breakage. Grippo also constructed and established the operation of the pretzel looping machines. In addition to the loop pretzel, Grippo's offers rod, braided, and twist pretzels.

By 1959, Grippo added potato chips to his snack food selection. Varieties currently produced include Bar-B-Q Potato Chips, Salt and Vinegar Chips, Cheddar Cheese and Jalapeno Chips, Hot Dill Pickle Chips, Smokin' Hot Kettle Chips, and Sweet Bermuda Onion Chips. Grippo's Bar-B-Q chips specifically are known for their often powdery and spicy barbecue coating. Popularity of the Bar-B-Q selection have inspired additional choices, such as X Hot BBQ Chips, XX Hot BBQ Chips, individual sale of Grippo's BBQ as a gourmet spice, and Grippo's Original BBQ Sauce. Although the origins to Grippo's have no known connection to the city of Evansville, Indiana, the Bar-B-Q Potato Chip product is incredibly popular there, and has become a significant part of the local culture. Grippo's has also expanded to other cities in the tristate area of Ohio, Kentucky and Indiana, with nostalgia and a "cult-like following" being cited for its popularity.
