= Mahmoud El-Nigero =

Egyptian footballer

Personal information
- Full name: Mahmoud Ismail El-Nigero
- Place of birth: Egypt
- Position: Forward

Senior career*
Years	Team	Apps	(Gls)
- Cairo Shourta Police

International career
- Egypt
- * Club domestic league appearances and goals

Mahmoud Ismail El-Nigero (dates of birth and death unknown) was an Egyptian football forward who played for Egypt in the 1934 FIFA World Cup. He also played for Cairo Shourta Police. El-Nigero is deceased.
