= Arnoldo Ortelli =

Swiss footballer (1913–1986)

Personal information
- Position: Defender

Senior career*
Years	Team	Apps	(Gls)
- FC Lugano

International career
1942	Switzerland	1	(0)
- * Club domestic league appearances and goals

Arnoldo Ortelli (5 August 1913 – 27 February 1986) was a Swiss footballer who played as a defender. He was a squad member for Switzerland in the 1934 FIFA World Cup. He earned his single cap in 1942. He also played for FC Lugano.
