= Charles Simons (footballer) =

Belgian footballer

Personal information
- Date of birth: 27 September 1906
- Place of birth: Antwerp, Belgium
- Date of death: 5 August 1979 (aged 72)

Senior career*
Years	Team	Apps	(Gls)
1923–1933	Royal Antwerp FC	177	(4)

International career
1931–1932	Belgium	10	(0)
- * Club domestic league appearances and goals

Charles Simons (27 September 1906 in Antwerp, Belgium – 5 August 1979) was a Belgian footballer who was in Belgium’s squad for the 1934 FIFA World Cup.

Simons died on 5 August 1979, at the age of 72.

== Career ==
Playing as a midfielder at Royal Antwerp FC, Charles Simons was Belgian champion in 1929 and 1931. He also played 10 times for the Diables Rouges in 1931 and 1932.

== Honours ==
- Belgian international in 1931 and 1932 (10 caps)
- Picked for the 1934 World Cup (did not play)
- Belgian Champions in 1929 and 1931 with Royal Antwerp FC
