= Otto Bühler =

Swiss footballer

Personal information
- Position: Forward

Senior career*
Years	Team	Apps	(Gls)
- Grasshopper Club Zürich

International career
1934	Switzerland	0	(0)
- * Club domestic league appearances and goals

Otto Bühler (dates of birth and death unknown) was a Swiss footballer who was a squad member for Switzerland in the 1934 FIFA World Cup. He also played for Grasshopper Club Zürich. Bühler is deceased.
