= Frédéric Dienert =

French biologist

Frédéric Vincent Dienert (6 September 1874 – 1948) was a French biologist who served as inspector general of the Paris water surveillance service. He was also a professor at the institute of agronomy and was among the first to note variation in yeast enzyme production in response to the sugars available in the medium, particularly the suppression of enzymes by the presence of glucose. In 1946 he served as president of the French Academy of Agriculture.

Dienert was influenced by the work of Louis Pasteur and worked on his thesis under Emile Duclaux (1840-1904). His 1900 thesis was to be the most influential work. He examined the fermentation of sugars by yeasts and noted that the fermentation of glucose and galactose could not be explained as being independent processes. Dienert used the word ‘l'accoutumance’ (habituation) to describe how yeasts raised in glucose and then placed in galactose lose their 'galactozymase'. He noted that it took time for the yeasts to ferment galactose and this "adaptation" took time.
