= Luis Izzeta =

Argentine footballer

Personal information
- Full name: Luis Luca Izzeta
- Date of birth: 1903
- Place of birth: Argentina
- Position: Forward

Senior career*
Years	Team	Apps	(Gls)
1934–1939	Defensores de Belgrano	64	(5)

International career
- Argentina
- * Club domestic league appearances and goals

Luis Luca Izzeta (b. 1903 - date of death unknown) was an Argentine football forward who played for Argentina in the 1934 FIFA World Cup. He also played for Defensores de Belgrano. Izzeta is deceased.
