= Helmi Moustafa =

Egyptian footballer (1911-1992)

Personal information
- Date of birth: 11 June 1911
- Date of death: 9 May 1992 (aged 80)

Senior career*
Years	Team	Apps	(Gls)
- Al Masry

International career
- Egypt
- * Club domestic league appearances and goals

Helmi Moustafa (11 June 1911 – 9 May 1992) was an Egyptian footballer who captained Al Masry SC. He competed in the men's tournament at the 1936 Summer Olympics.
