= Kamel Masoud =

Egyptian footballer (born 1914)

Personal information
- Date of birth: 2 August 1914
- Place of birth: Egypt
- Position: Forward

Senior career*
Years	Team	Apps	(Gls)
- Al Ahly

International career
- Egypt
- * Club domestic league appearances and goals

Kamel Masoud or Kamel Mosaoud (Arabic: كَامِل مَسْعُود; born 2 August 1914-date of death unknown) was an Egyptian football forward who played as a forward for Egypt in the 1934 FIFA World Cup. He also played for the Egyptian team Al Ahly. Masoud is deceased.
