= Jan Graafland =

Dutch footballer

Personal information
- Date of birth: 21 August 1909
- Place of birth: Leeuwarden, Netherlands
- Position: Forward

Senior career*
Years	Team	Apps	(Gls)
- HBS Craeyenhout
- * Club domestic league appearances and goals

Johannes Hendrikus Adrianus Graafland (born 21 August 1909-date of death unknown) was a Dutch football forward who was included in the Netherlands' squad at the 1934 FIFA World Cup. However, he did not play and never made an appearance for the national team. He also played for HBS Craeyenhout. Graafland is deceased.
