= Josef Streb =

German footballer

Personal information
- Date of birth: 16 April 1912
- Place of birth: Germany
- Date of death: 22 August 1986 (aged 74)
- Position: Striker

Senior career*
Years	Team	Apps	(Gls)
- Wacker München

International career
1934	Germany	0	(0)
- * Club domestic league appearances and goals

Josef Streb (16 April 1912 – 22 August 1986) was a German footballer who participated at the 1934 FIFA World Cup. He played club football with Wacker München.
