= Ernesto Albarracín =

Argentine footballer

Ernesto Albarracin
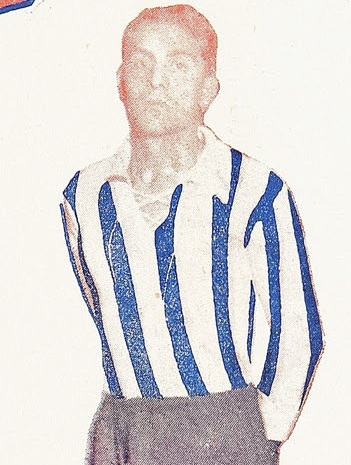
- Ernesto Albarracin

Personal information
- Full name: Ernesto Oscar Albarracín
- Place of birth: Argentina
- Position: Midfielder

Senior career*
Years	Team	Apps	(Gls)
? - 1930	Sportivo Barracas		
1931	River Plate	11	(0)
1931	Platense	2	(0)
1932-1934	Tigre	(total) 49	(0)
1934	Sportivo Buenos Aires		
1935	Tigre	(see above)	
1936	Argentinos Juniors	2	(0)
1937	Dock Sud	15	(3)
1938-1939	Barracas Central	31	(0)

International career
- Argentina
- * Club domestic league appearances and goals

Ernesto Oscar Albarracín is an Argentine football midfielder who played for Argentina in the 1934 FIFA World Cup. He has also played for Club Sportivo Buenos Aires. Albarracín is deceased.
