= Franz Dienert =

German footballer

Personal information
- Date of birth: 1 January 1900
- Date of death: 1978 (aged 78)
- Position: Striker

Senior career*
Years	Team	Apps	(Gls)
- VfB Mühlburg

International career
- Germany
- * Club domestic league appearances and goals

Franz Dienert (1 January 1900 – 1978) was a German footballer who participated at the 1934 FIFA World Cup. He played club football with VfB Mühlburg.
