= Ahmed Halim Ibrahim =

Egyptian footballer (born 1910)

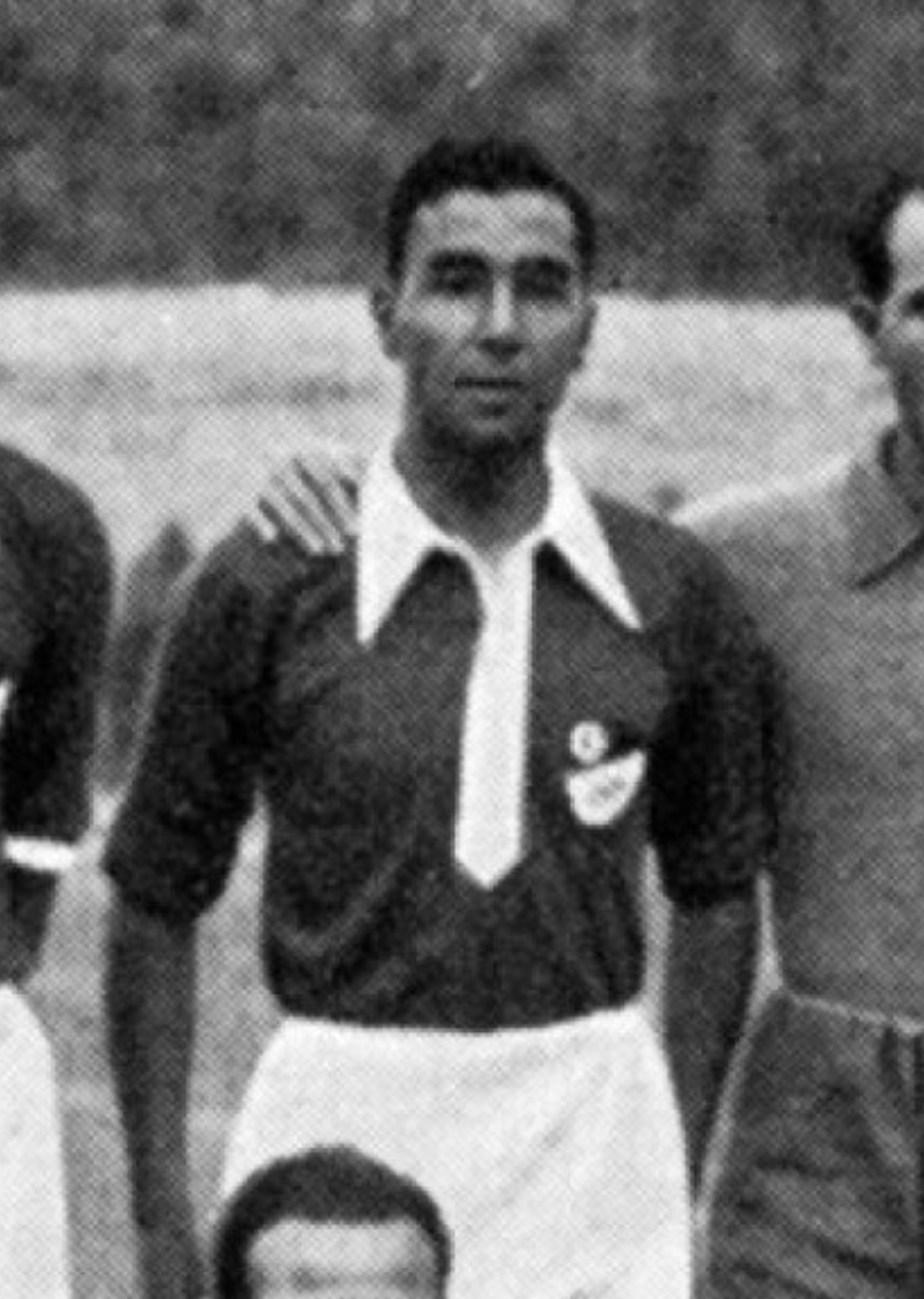
- Ibrahim with Egypt in the 1936 Olympic Games

Personal information
- Date of birth: 10 February 1910
- Place of birth: Egypt
- Position: Midfielder

Senior career*
Years	Team	Apps	(Gls)
- Zamalek SC

International career
- Egypt
- * Club domestic league appearances and goals

Ahmed Halim Ibrahim (Arabic: أَحْمَد حَلِيم إِبْرَاهِيم; born 10 February 1910, date of death unknown) was an Egyptian football midfielder who played for Egypt in the 1934 FIFA World Cup. He also played for Zamalek SC, and represented Egypt at the 1936 Summer Olympics. Ibrahim is deceased.
