= Aziz Fahmy =

Egyptian footballer

Abdel-Aziz Fahmy
Personal information
- Full name: Abdel-Aziz Fahmy Ahmed Abdel-Wahab Shehata
- Date of birth: 1914
- Place of birth: Egypt
- Date of death: 1992 (aged 77–78)
- Place of death: Canada
- Position: Goalkeeper

Senior career*
Years	Team	Apps	(Gls)
- Al Ahly
- Zamalek

International career
- Egypt
- * Club domestic league appearances and goals

Abdel-Aziz Fahmy Ahmed Abdel-Wahab Shehata (Arabic: عَبْد الْعَزِيز فَهْمِيّ أَحْمَد عَبْد الْوَهَّاب شَحَّاتَة; 1914 – 1991) was an Egyptian football goalkeeper who played for Egypt in the 1934 FIFA World Cup. He also played for Al Ahly and Zamalek
