= Ángel Grippa =

Argentine footballer

Personal information
- Full name: Ángel Grippa
- Date of birth: March 2, 1914
- Place of birth: Argentina
- Position: Goalkeeper

Senior career*
Years	Team	Apps	(Gls)
1934	Sportivo Alsina		
1935-1938	Argentinos Juniors	58	(0)

International career
- Argentina
- * Club domestic league appearances and goals

Ángel Grippa (2 March 1914; date of death unknown) is an Argentinian football goalkeeper who played for Argentina in the 1934 FIFA World Cup. He also played for Club Sportivo Alsina. Grippa is deceased.
