= Enrique Chimento =

Argentine footballer

Personal information
- Full name: Enrique Chimento
- Place of birth: Argentina
- Position: Defender

Senior career*
Years	Team	Apps	(Gls)
1931	Lanús	1	(0)
1934-1938	Barracas Central	40	(0)

International career
- Argentina
- * Club domestic league appearances and goals

Enrique Chimento is an Argentine football defender who played for Argentina in the 1934 FIFA World Cup. He also played for Barracas Central. Chimento is deceased.
