= Hassan El-Far =

Egyptian footballer (1912-1973)

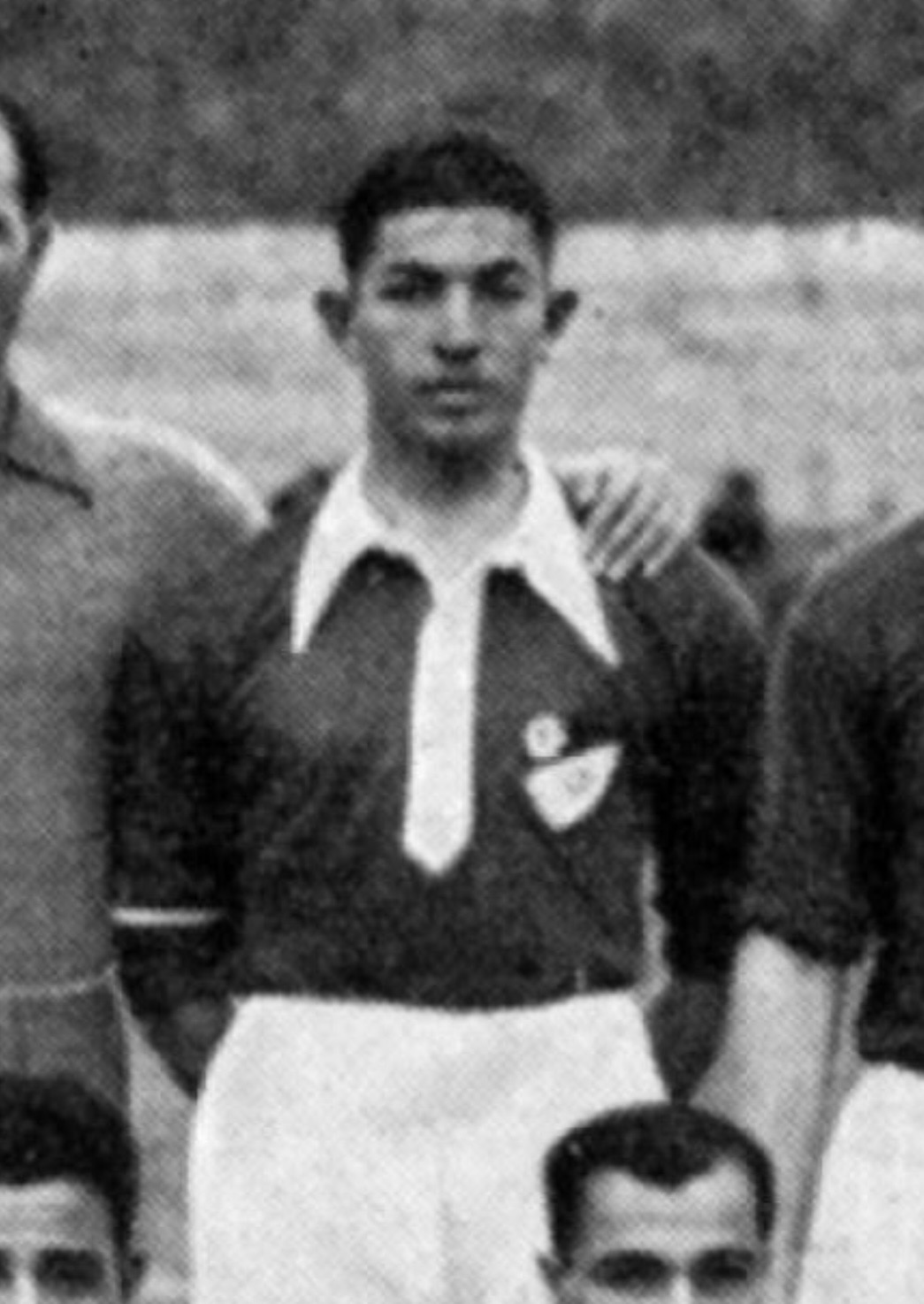
- El-Far with Egypt in the 1936 Olympic Games

Personal information
- Full name: Hassan Ahmed El-Far
- Date of birth: 21 May 1912
- Place of birth: Egypt
- Date of death: 8 August 1973 (aged 61)
- Height: 1.73 m (5 ft 8 in)
- Position: Midfielder

Senior career*
Years	Team	Apps	(Gls)
1930–1947	Zamalek SC		

International career
- Egypt
- * Club domestic league appearances and goals

Hassan Ahmed El-Far (Arabic: حَسَن أَحْمَد الْفَار; 21 May 1912 – 8 August 1973) was an Egyptian football midfielder who played for Egypt in the 1934 FIFA World Cup. He also participated in the 1936 Summer Olympics and played for Zamalek SC.

== Honours and achievements ==
=== Club ===
Zamalek

- Cairo League: (6) 1931–32, 1939–40, 1940–41, 1943–44, 1944–45, 1945–46
- Egypt Cup: (6) 1931–32, 1934–35, 1937–38, 1940–41, 1942–43, 1943–44
- King Fouad Cup: (2) 1933–34, 1940–41
