= Károly Weichelt =

Romanian footballer

Personal information
- Date of birth: 2 March 1906
- Place of birth: Nagyvárad, Austria-Hungary (now in Romania)
- Date of death: 4 July 1971 (aged 65)
- Position: Midfielder

Youth career
- 1924–1926: SG Arad

Senior career*
Years	Team	Apps	(Gls)
1933–1935	CA Oradea	14	(0)
1935–1937	Gloria CFR Arad	24	(0)
Total		28	(0)

International career
1924	Romania	1	(0)
- * Club domestic league appearances and goals

Károly Weichelt (Also spelled Carol Weichelt, 2 March 1906 – 4 July 1971) was a Romanian international footballer, who played as a midfielder.

== Biography ==
Weichelt spent his career in Liga I with Clubul Atletic Oradea.

With the Romania national football team, he was selected by joint coaches Josef Uridil and Costel Rădulescu to take part in the 1934 World Cup in Italy. The team was eliminated in the first round after a 2–1 defeat to Czechoslovakia. He made one appearance for the national team in 1924, in a friendly which ended with a 4–1 loss against Czechoslovakia.
