= 1938 FIFA World Cup final tournament =

Football competition

The final tournament of the 1938 FIFA World Cup was a single-elimination tournament involving the 16 teams which qualified for the tournament. The tournament began with the round of 16 on 4 June and concluded with the final on 19 June 1938. Italy won the final 4–2 for their second World Cup title.

Kick off times were scheduled at 17:00 for weekend matches (round of 16, quarter-finals and both finals), at 18:00 for matches in the middle of the week (semi-finals and replays).

== Bracket ==
Round of 16
5 June – Marseille
Italy (a.e.t.)	2
Norway	1
5 June – Colombes
France	3
Belgium	1
5 June – Strasbourg
Brazil (a.e.t.)	6
Poland	5
5 June – Le Havre
Czechoslovakia (a.e.t.)	3
Netherlands	0
5 June – Reims
Hungary	6
Dutch East Indies	0
4 / 9 June – Paris
Switzerland (rep.)	1 / 4
Germany	1 / 2
5 June – Lyon
Sweden	w/o
Austria
5 / 9 June – Toulouse
Cuba (rep.)	3 / 2
Romania	3 / 1

Quarter-finals
12 June – Colombes
Italy	3
France	1
12 / 14 June – Bordeaux
Brazil (rep.)	1 / 2
Czechoslovakia	1 / 1
12 June – Lille
Hungary	2
Switzerland	0
12 June – Antibes
Sweden	8
Cuba	0

Semi-finals
16 June – Marseille
Italy	2
Brazil	1
16 June – Paris
Hungary	5
Sweden	1

Final
19 June – Colombes
Italy	4
Hungary	2
Match for third place
19 June – Bordeaux
Brazil	4
Sweden	2

== Round of 16 ==
=== Switzerland vs Germany ===
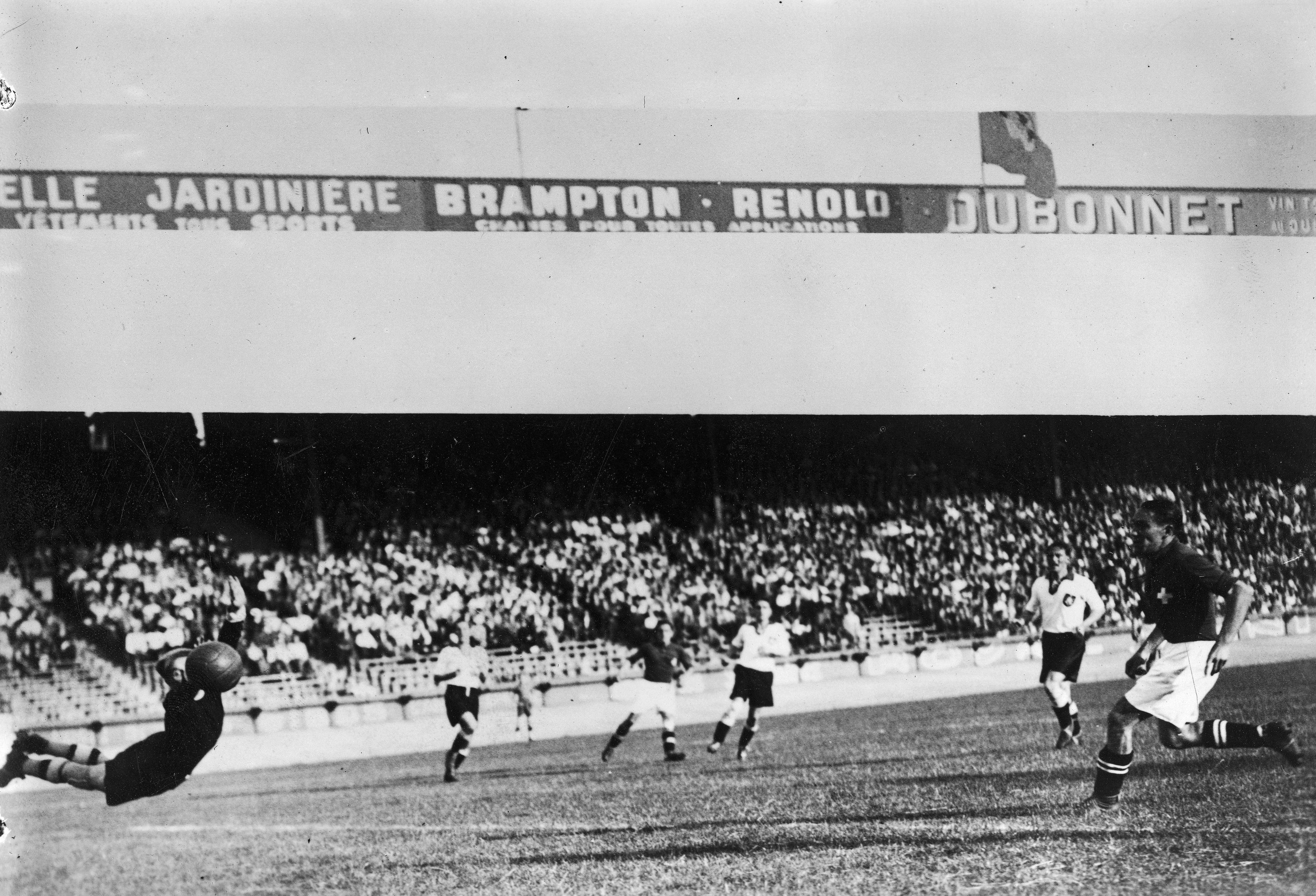
Germany v Switzerland

Switzerland adopted a precursor version of the Catenaccio system to try stopping the talented German forwards. Thanks to this tactical system, the Swiss managed to frustrate the Germans despite going behind after a goal from Josef Gauchel. Switzerland drew level through André Abegglen after a mistake from Willibald Schmaus. Although the Germans pushed for the win, the game ended with a draw, forcing a replay.

4 June 1938
17:00 WEST (UTC+01:00)

Switzerland	1–1 (a.e.t.)	Germany
Abegglen 43'		Gauchel 29'

Parc des Princes, Paris
Attendance: 27,152
Referee: John Langenus (Belgium)

Switzerland
Germany

GK	Willy Huber
RB	Severino Minelli (c)
LB	August Lehmann
RH	Hermann Springer
CH	Sirio Vernati
LH	Ernst Lörtscher
OR	Lauro Amadò
IR	André Abegglen
CF	Alfred Bickel
IL	Eugen Walaschek
OL	Georges Aeby
Manager:
Karl Rappan

GK	Rudolf Raftl
RB	Paul Janes
LB	Willibald Schmaus
RH	Andreas Kupfer
CH	Hans Mock (c)
LH	Albin Kitzinger
OR	Ernst Lehner
IR	Rudolf Gellesch
CF	Josef Gauchel
IL	Wilhelm Hahnemann
OL	Hans Pesser	(red card) 96'
Manager:
Sepp Herberger

Assistant referees:
Johannes van Moorsel (Netherlands)
Paul Marenco (France)

=== Hungary vs Dutch East Indies ===
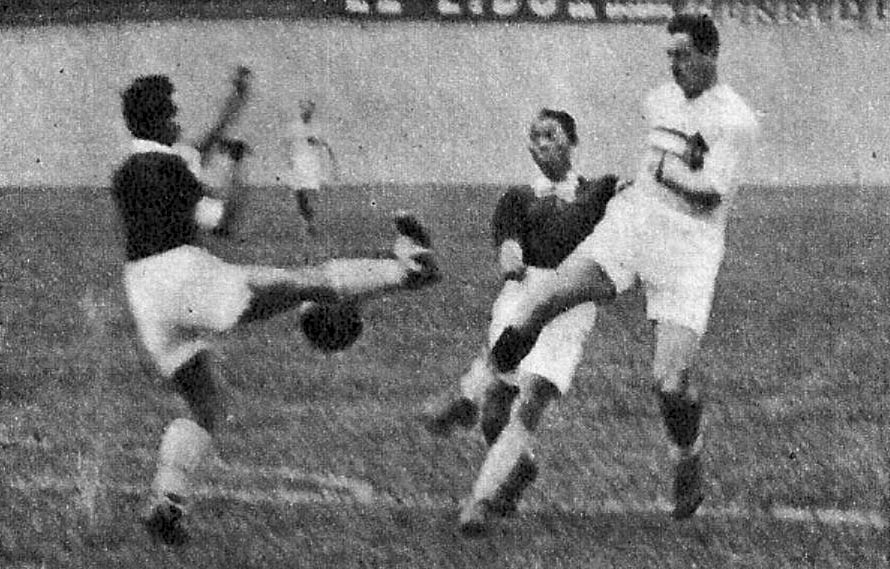
Hungary vs Dutch East Indies

The difference in strength between the two teams was evident as the game resulted in a humiliation for the Dutch East Indies, which managed to hold out for just 13 minutes. In the second half, although Hungary relaxed their pressure, they were never truly troubled by the opponents.

5 June 1938
17:00 WEST (UTC+01:00)

Hungary	6–0	Dutch East Indies
Kohut 13'; Toldi 15'; G. Sárosi 25', 89'; Zsengellér 30', 76'

Vélodrome Municipal, Reims
Attendance: 9,000
Referee: Roger Conrié (France)

Hungary
Dutch East Indies

GK	József Háda
RB	Lajos Korányi
LB	Sándor Bíró
RH	Gyula Lázár
CH	József Turay
LH	István Balogh
OR	Ferenc Sas
IR	Gyula Zsengellér
CF	György Sárosi (c)
IL	Géza Toldi
OL	Vilmos Kohut
Managers:
Károly Dietz; Alfréd Schaffer

GK	Mo Heng Tan
RB	Jack Samuels
LB	Frans G. Hukom
RH	Sutan Anwar
CH	Frans Alfred Meeng
LH	Achmad Nawir (c)
OR	M.J. Hans Taihuttu
IR	Tjaak Pattiwael
CF	Herman Zomers
IL	Suvarte Soedarmadji
OL	The Hong Djien
Manager:
Jan Mastenbroek

Assistant referees:
Charles de la Salle (France)
Karl Weingärtner (Germany)

=== Sweden vs Austria ===
Austria did not participate due to the Anschluss, so Sweden advanced directly to the quarter-finals.

5 June 1938

Sweden	Cancelled	Austria

Stade Gerland, Lyon

Sweden advanced on walkover.

=== Cuba vs Romania ===
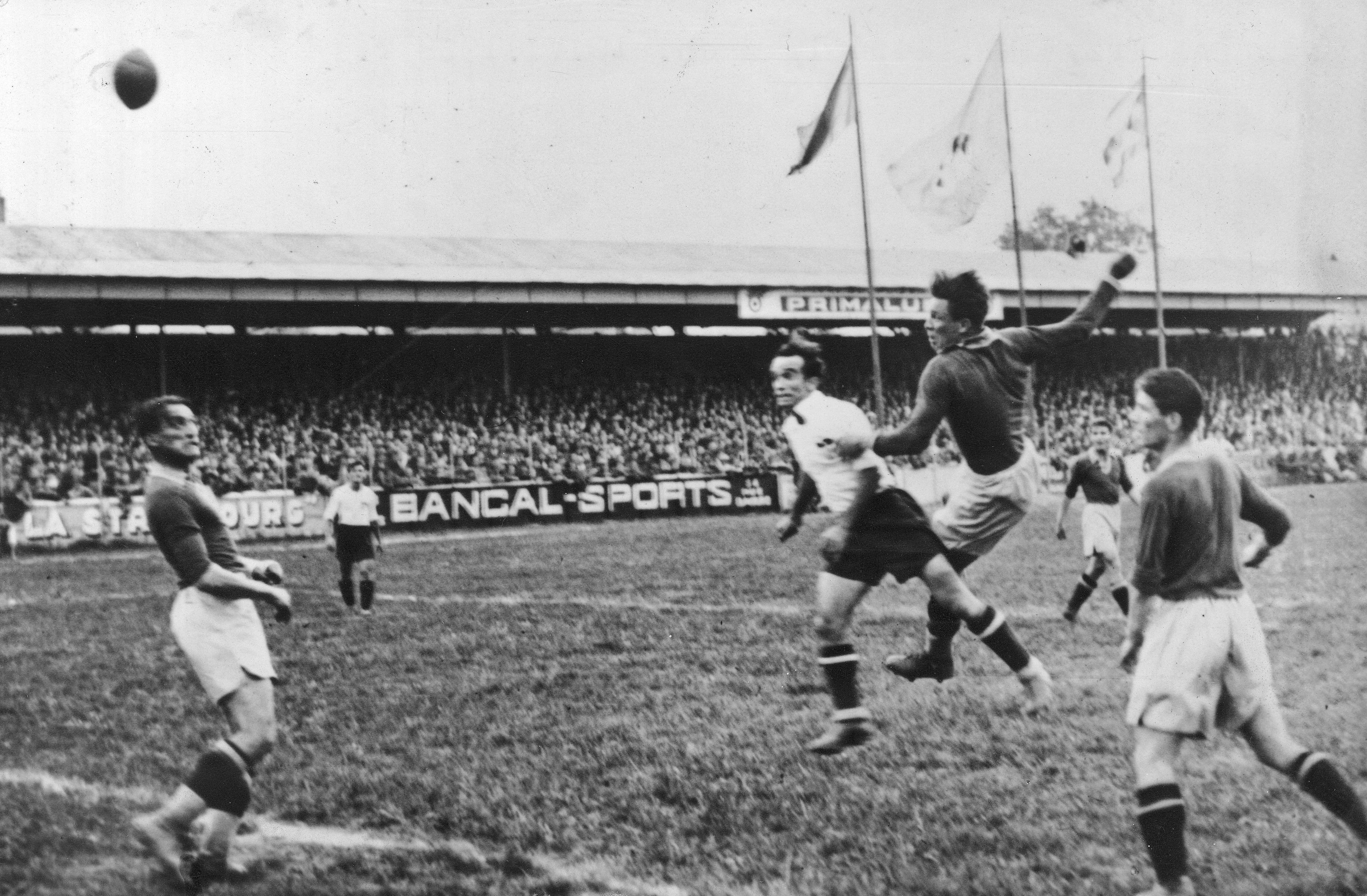
Cuba v Romania, first match

Cuba, who had only qualified because other Latin American selections had withdrawn, impressed against Romania. Romania scored first through either Silviu Bindea or Nicolae Kovács, depending on the source. Cuba drew level through Héctor Socorro, who converted a cross from José Magriñá and then took the lead with a goal from Magriñá himself. However, equalisers from Iuliu Baratky and Ștefan Dobay forced a replay.

5 June 1938
17:00 WEST (UTC+01:00)

Cuba	3–3 (a.e.t.)	Romania
Socorro 44', 103'; Magriñá 69'		Bindea 35'; Barátky 88'; Dobay 105'

Stade du T.O.E.C., Toulouse
Attendance: 7,000
Referee: Giuseppe Scarpi (Italy)

Cuba
Romania

GK	Benito Carvajales
RB	Jacinto Barquín
LB	Manuel Chorens (c)
RH	Joaquín Arias
CH	José Antonio Rodríguez
LH	Pedro Bergés
OR	José Magriñá
IR	Tomás Fernández
CF	Héctor Socorro
IL	Juan Tuñas
OL	Mario Sosa
Manager:
José Tapia

GK	Dumitru Pavlovici
RB	Rudolf Bürger
LB	Vasile Chiroiu
RH	Vintilă Cossini
CH	Gheorghe Rășinaru
LH	László Raffinsky
OR	Silviu Bindea
IR	Nicolae Kovács (c)
CF	Iuliu Baratky
IL	Iuliu Bodola
OL	Ștefan Dobay
Managers:
Alexandru Săvulescu; Costel Rădulescu

Assistant referees:
Ferdinand Valprede (France)
Jean Merckx (France)

=== France vs Belgium ===
The hosts took the lead with only 35 seconds on the clock thanks to a shot from close range by winger Émile Veinante. France doubled their advantage soon after, but the lead was halved before the interval thanks to Hendrik Isemborghs, who connected with a free kick from Bernard Voorhoof. In the second half, Jean Nicolas got his brace, sealing the victory for France.

5 June 1938
17:00 WEST (UTC+01:00)

France	3–1	Belgium
Veinante 1'; Nicolas 16', 69'		Isemborghs 38'

Stade Olympique de Colombes, Colombes
Attendance: 30,454
Referee: Hans Wüthrich (Switzerland)

France
Belgium

GK	Laurent Di Lorto
RB	Hector Cazenave
LB	Étienne Mattler (c)
RH	Jean Bastien
CH	Auguste Jordan
LH	Raoul Diagne
OR	Alfred Aston
IR	Oscar Heisserer
CF	Jean Nicolas
IL	Edmond Delfour
OL	Émile Veinante
Manager:
Gaston Barreau

GK	Arnold Badjou
RB	Robert Paverick
LB	Corneel Seys
RH	John Van Alphen
CH	Émile Stijnen (c)
LH	Alfons De Winter
OR	Charles Vanden Wouwer
IR	Bernard Voorhoof
CF	Hendrik Isemborghs
IL	Raymond Braine
OL	Fernand Buyle
Manager:
Jack Butler

Assistant referees:
Augustin Krist (Czechoslovakia)
Alfred Birlem (Germany)

=== Italy vs Norway ===
Mindful of the game played against Norway at the semi-finals of the 1936 Summer Olympics, when Italy managed to scrap a win only during extra time, Vittorio Pozzo was not to be overconfident. Italy managed to grab an early lead with Pietro Ferraris, but struggle to threaten Norway's goal further besides hitting the post once. In the second half, Norway was the better team, hitting the woodwork thrice and finally drawing level in the 83rd minute. Soon inside the extra time, Silvio Piola converted in goal a rebounded shot. Italy managed to hold out for the remaining time, reaching the quarter-finals.

5 June 1938
17:00 WEST (UTC+01:00)

Italy	2–1 (a.e.t.)	Norway
Ferraris 2'; Piola 94'		Brustad 83'

Stade Vélodrome, Marseille
Attendance: 19,000
Referee: Alois Beranek (Germany) (Note: Actually from Austria, but representing the German Football Association because of the Anschluss.)

Italy
Norway

GK	Aldo Olivieri
RB	Eraldo Monzeglio
LB	Pietro Rava
RH	Pietro Serantoni
CH	Michele Andreolo
LH	Ugo Locatelli
OR	Piero Pasinati
IR	Giuseppe Meazza (c)
CF	Silvio Piola
IL	Giovanni Ferrari
OL	Pietro Ferraris
Manager:
Vittorio Pozzo

GK	Henry Johansen
RB	Rolf Johannessen
LB	Øivind Holmsen
RH	Kristian Henriksen
CH	Nils Eriksen (c)
LH	Rolf Holmberg
OR	Odd Frantzen
IR	Reidar Kvammen
CF	Knut Brynildsen
IL	Magnar Isaksen
OL	Arne Brustad
Manager:
Asbjørn Halvorsen

Assistant referees:
Georges Boutoure (France)
Paul Tréhou (France)

=== Brazil vs Poland ===
5 June 1938
17:00 WEST (UTC+01:00)

Brazil	6–5 (a.e.t.)	Poland
Leônidas 18', 93', 104'; Romeu 25'; Perácio 44', 71'		Scherfke 23' (pen.); Wilimowski 53', 59', 89', 118'

Stade de la Meinau, Strasbourg
Attendance: 13,452
Referee: Ivan Eklind (Sweden)

Brazil
Poland

GK	Batatais
RB	Domingos da Guia
LB	Arthur Machado
RH	Zezé Procópio
CH	Martim (c)
LH	Afonsinho
OR	Lopes
IR	Romeu
CF	Leônidas
IL	José Perácio
OL	Hércules
Manager:
Adhemar Pimenta

GK	Edward Madejski
RB	Antoni Gałecki
LB	Władysław Szczepaniak (c)
RH	Ewald Dytko
CH	Erwin Nyc
LH	Wilhelm Góra
OR	Gerard Wodarz
IR	Ernst Wilimowski
CF	Friedrich Scherfke
IL	Leonard Piątek
OL	Ryszard Piec
Manager:
Józef Kałuża

Linesmen:
Louis Poissant (France)
Ernest Kissenberger (France)

=== Czechoslovakia vs Netherlands ===
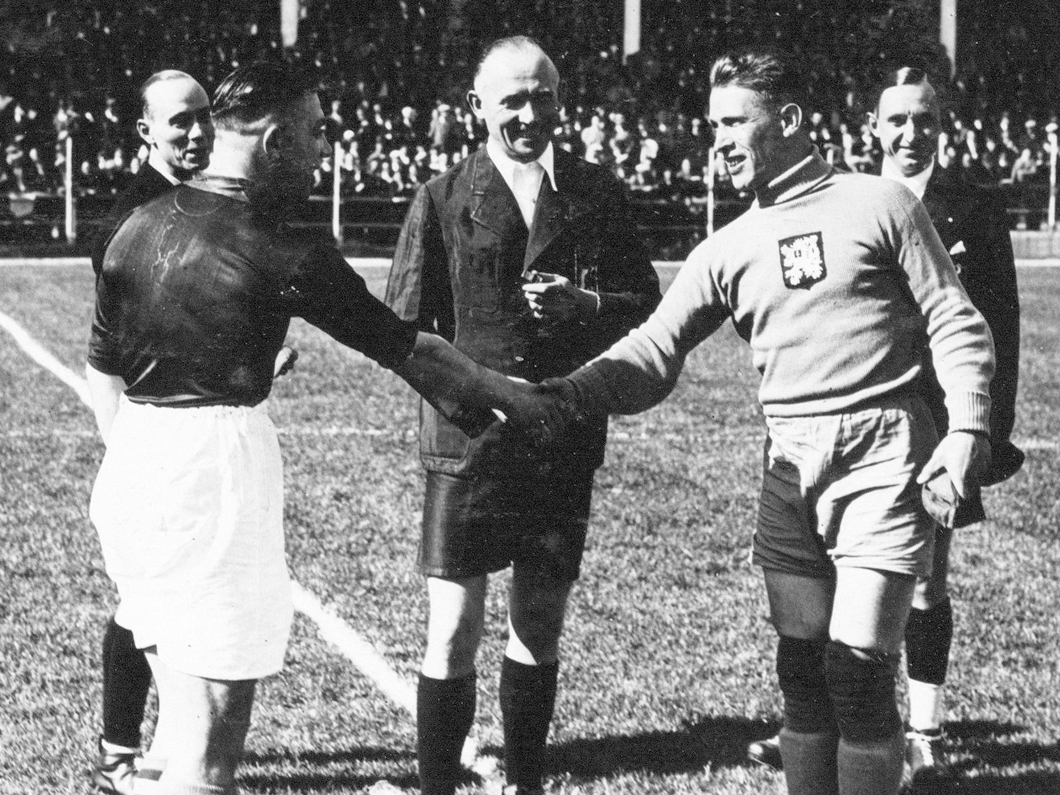
Both captains greeting

Finalist at the 1934 World Cup, Czechoslovakia faced a modest Dutch team. Czechoslovakia dominated the ball but did not manage to convert their possession into clear-cut chances against a defensively sound Dutch team. In fact, Czechoslovakia managed to take the lead only in extra-time through a long-range effort, scoring a further two goals by the end of the game.

5 June 1938
17:00 WEST (UTC+01:00)

Czechoslovakia	3–0 (a.e.t.)	Netherlands
Košťálek 93'; Nejedlý 111'; Zeman 118'

Stade Municipal, Le Havre
Attendance: 11,000
Referee: Lucien Leclercq (France)

Czechoslovakia
Netherlands

GK	František Plánička (c)
RB	Jaroslav Burgr
LB	Ferdinand Daučík
RH	Josef Košťálek
CH	Jaroslav Bouček
LH	Vlastimil Kopecký
OR	Jan Říha
IR	Ladislav Šimůnek
CF	Josef Zeman
IL	Oldřich Nejedlý
OL	Oldřich Rulc
Manager:
Josef Meissner

GK	Adri van Male
RB	Mauk Weber
LB	Bertus Caldenhove
RH	Bas Paauwe
CH	Wim Anderiesen
LH	Puck van Heel (c)
OR	Frank Wels
IR	Frans van der Veen
CF	Leen Vente
IL	Kick Smit
OL	Bertus de Harder
Manager:
Bob Glendenning

Assistant referees:
Eugené Olive (France)
Victor Sdez (France)

=== Replay: Switzerland vs Germany ===
This replay was five days later. Switzerland used the same line-ups as the first game, while Germany made a few changes. Georges Aeby was injured after a few minutes, forcing Switzerland to play with 10 men. Germany took soon advantage, scoring twice. However, Switzerland reacted well, and with Aeby back on the pitch in the second half, completed a remarkable comeback.

9 June 1938
18:00 WEST (UTC+01:00)

Switzerland	4–2	Germany
Walaschek 42'; Bickel 64'; Abegglen 75', 78'		Hahnemann 8'; Lörtscher 22' (o.g.)

Parc des Princes, Paris
Attendance: 20,025
Referee: Ivan Eklind (Sweden)

Switzerland
Germany

GK	Willy Huber
RB	Severino Minelli (c)
LB	August Lehmann
RH	Hermann Springer
CH	Sirio Vernati
LH	Ernst Lörtscher
OR	Lauro Amadò
IR	André Abegglen
CF	Alfred Bickel
IL	Eugen Walaschek
OL	Georges Aeby
Manager:
Karl Rappan

GK	Rudolf Raftl
RB	Paul Janes
LB	Jakob Streitle
RH	Andreas Kupfer
CH	Ludwig Goldbrunner
LH	Stefan Skoumal
OR	Ernst Lehner
IR	Josef Stroh
CF	Fritz Szepan (c)
IL	Wilhelm Hahnemann
OL	Leopold Neumer
Manager:
Sepp Herberger

Assistant referees:
Johannes van Moorsel (Netherlands)
Louis Baert (Belgium)

=== Replay: Cuba vs Romania ===
The performance of Cuba's replacement goalkeeper Juan Ayra was equally exceptional as the one from Benito Carvajales in the original match. Romania took the lead with Ștefan Dobay in the first half, but Cuba fought back and scored two goals in rapid succession soon after the beginning of the second and managed to hold on to the score against all odds and reach the quarter-finals.

9 June 1938
18:00 WEST (UTC+01:00)

Cuba	2–1	Romania
Socorro 51'; Fernández 57'		Dobay 35'

Stade du T.O.E.C., Toulouse
Attendance: 8,000
Referee: Alfred Birlem (Germany)

Cuba
Romania

GK	Juan Ayra
RB	Jacinto Barquín
LB	Manuel Chorens (c)
RH	Joaquín Arias
CH	José Antonio Rodríguez
LH	Pedro Bergés
OR	José Magriñá
IR	Tomás Fernández
CF	Héctor Socorro
IL	Juan Tuñas
OL	Mario Sosa
Manager:
José Tapia

GK	Robert Sadowski
RB	Rudolf Bürger
LB	Iacob Felecan
RH	Andrei Bărbulescu
CH	Gheorghe Rășinaru (c)
LH	László Raffinsky
OR	Ion Bogdan
IR	Ioachim Moldoveanu
CF	Iuliu Baratky
IL	Gyula Prassler
OL	Ștefan Dobay
Managers:
Alexandru Săvulescu; Costel Rădulescu

Assistant referees:
Georges Capdeville (France)
Paul Marenco (France)

== Quarter-finals ==
=== Hungary vs Switzerland ===
Hungary looked like the stronger team as the Swiss were missing key players such as Georges Aeby and Severino Minelli. Hungary took the lead with a header from György Sárosi. The result was in doubt for most of the second half, until Gyula Zsengellér sealed the game with a long-range effort in the dying minutes. Switzerland's manager Karl Rappan resigned after the game.

12 June 1938
17:00 WEST (UTC+01:00)

Hungary	2–0	Switzerland
G. Sárosi 40'; Zsengellér 89' (Note: RSSSF credits this goal as coming in the 90th minute.)

Stade Victor Boucquey, Lille
Attendance: 15,000
Referee: Rinaldo Barlassina (Italy)

Hungary
Switzerland

GK	Antal Szabó
RB	Lajos Korányi
LB	Sándor Bíró
RH	Antal Szalay
CH	József Turay
LH	Gyula Lázár
OR	Ferenc Sas
IR	Jenő Vincze
CF	György Sárosi (c)
IL	Gyula Zsengellér
OL	Vilmos Kohut
Managers:
Károly Dietz; Alfréd Schaffer

GK	Willy Huber
RB	Adolf Stelzer
LB	August Lehmann (c)
RH	Hermann Springer
CH	Sirio Vernati
LH	Ernst Lörtscher
OR	Lauro Amadò
IR	André Abegglen
CF	Alfred Bickel
IL	Eugen Walaschek
OL	Tullio Grassi
Manager:
Karl Rappan

Assistant referees:
Alois Beranek (Germany)
Georges Boutoure (France)

=== Sweden vs Cuba ===
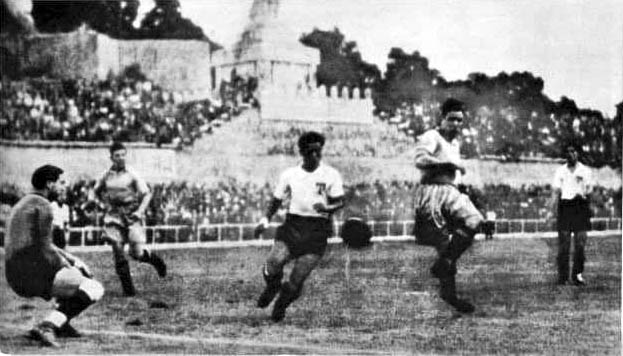
Sweden v Cuba

The result was never in doubt as Sweden was more accustomed to playing at this level. Gustav Wetterström netted a hat-trick before half-time, with the Cubans unable to deal with the relentless Swedish forward play, especially after Joaquín Arias was forced to leave the pitch injured. Tomás Fernández missed a penalty for Cuba.

12 June 1938
17:00 WEST (UTC+01:00)

Sweden	8–0	Cuba
H. Andersson 9', 81', 89' (Note: RSSSF credits the 81st-minute goal as coming in the 61st minute.); Wetterström 22', 37', 44'; Keller 80' (Note: RSSSF credits goal in the 80th minute as coming in the 60th minute.); Nyberg 84' (Note: RSSSF credits this goal as coming in the 89th minute.)

Stade du Fort Carré, Antibes
Attendance: 7,000
Referee: Augustin Krist (Czechoslovakia)

Sweden
Cuba

GK	Henock Abrahamsson
RB	Ivar Eriksson
LB	Olle Källgren
RH	Erik Almgren
CH	Sven Jacobsson
LH	Kurt Svanström
OR	Arne Nyberg
IR	Sven Jonasson
CF	Harry Andersson
IL	Tore Keller (c)
OL	Gustav Wetterström
Manager:
(Hungary) József Nagy

GK	Benito Carvajales
RB	Jacinto Barquín
LB	Manuel Chorens (c)
RH	Joaquín Arias
CH	José Antonio Rodríguez
LH	Pedro Bergés
OR	Pedro Ferrer
IR	Tomás Fernández
CF	Héctor Socorro
IL	Juan Tuñas
OL	Juan Alonzo
Manager:
José Tapia

Assistant referees:
Karl Weingärtner (Germany)
Victor Sedez (France)

=== Italy vs France ===
Title-holders Italy met hosts France in what was considered one of the most enticing games of the tournament. Italy wore their Fascist affiliated black shirts despite the anti-Fascism protests that the team had received in France. Italy had a better start, scoring within the first nine minutes, but France levelled immediately. In the second half, France tried to control the ball but, in doing so, they left themselves open for the lethal Italian counter-attack. Silvio Piola scored a brace while unmarked, leading Italy to the semi-finals.

12 June 1938
17:00 WEST (UTC+01:00)

Italy	3–1	France
Colaussi 9'; Piola 51', 72'		Heisserer 10'

Stade Olympique de Colombes, Colombes
Attendance: 58,455
Referee: Louis Baert (Belgium)

Italy
France

GK	Aldo Olivieri
RB	Alfredo Foni
LB	Pietro Rava
RH	Pietro Serantoni
CH	Michele Andreolo
LH	Ugo Locatelli
OR	Amedeo Biavati
IR	Giuseppe Meazza (c)
CF	Silvio Piola
IL	Giovanni Ferrari
OL	Gino Colaussi
Manager:
Vittorio Pozzo

GK	Laurent Di Lorto
RB	Hector Cazenave
LB	Étienne Mattler (c)
RH	Jean Bastien
CH	Auguste Jordan
LH	Raoul Diagne
OR	Alfred Aston
IR	Oscar Heisserer
CF	Jean Nicolas
IL	Edmond Delfour
OL	Émile Veinante
Manager:
Gaston Barreau

Assistant referees:
Hans Wüthrich (Switzerland)
Ivan Eklind (Sweden)

=== Brazil vs Czechoslovakia ===
12 June 1938
17:00 WEST (UTC+01:00)

Brazil	1–1 (a.e.t.)	Czechoslovakia
Leônidas 30'		Nejedlý 65' (pen.)

Parc Lescure, Bordeaux
Attendance: 22,021
Referee: Pál von Hertzka (Hungary)

Brazil
Czechoslovakia

GK	Walter
RB	Domingos da Guia
LB	Arthur Machado	(red card) 89'
RH	Zezé Procópio	(red card) 14'
CH	Martim (c)
LH	Afonsinho
OR	Lopes
IR	Romeu
CF	Leônidas
IL	José Perácio
OL	Hércules
Manager:
Adhemar Pimenta

GK	František Plánička (c)
RB	Jaroslav Burgr
LB	Ferdinand Daučík
RH	Josef Košťálek
CH	Jaroslav Bouček
LH	Vlastimil Kopecký
OR	Jan Říha	(red card) 89'
IR	Ladislav Šimůnek
CF	Josef Ludl
IL	Oldřich Nejedlý
OL	Antonín Puč
Manager:
Josef Meissner

Linesmen:
Giuseppe Scarpi (Italy)
Charles de la Salle (France)

=== Replay: Brazil vs Czechoslovakia ===
14 June 1938
18:00 WEST (UTC+01:00)

Brazil	2–1	Czechoslovakia
Leônidas 57'; Roberto 62' (Note: FIFA initially credited this goal to Leônidas, but changed it to Roberto in 2006.)		Kopecký 25'

Parc Lescure, Bordeaux
Attendance: 18,141
Referee: Georges Capdeville (France)

Brazil
Czechoslovakia

GK	Walter
RB	Jaú
LB	Nariz
RH	Britto
CH	Brandão
LH	Argemiro
OR	Roberto
IR	Luisinho
CF	Leônidas (c)
IL	Tim
OL	Patesko
Manager:
Adhemar Pimenta

GK	Karel Burkert
RB	Jaroslav Burgr (c)
LB	Ferdinand Daučík
RH	Josef Košťálek
CH	Jaroslav Bouček
LH	Arnošt Kreuz
OR	Václav Horák
IR	Karel Senecký
CF	Josef Ludl
IL	Vlastimil Kopecký
OL	Oldřich Rulc
Manager:
Josef Meissner

Assistant referees:
Ernest Kissenberger (France)
Paul Marenco (France)

== Semi-finals ==
=== Hungary vs Sweden ===
Sweden took the lead after just 35 seconds, but that remained the only goal scored by them. Hungary quickly settled in control of the game, scoring thrice before half-time. Sweden, who had impressed in previous games, could not resist the vastly superior opponent, who scored two additional goals in the second half, cruising towards the final after a comfortable win.

16 June 1938
18:00 WEST (UTC+01:00)

Hungary	5–1	Sweden
Jacobsson 19' (o.g.); Titkos 37'; Zsengellér 39', 85'; G. Sárosi 65'		Nyberg 1'

Parc des Princes, Paris
Attendance: 20,000
Referee: Lucien Leclercq (France)

Hungary
Sweden

GK	Antal Szabó
RB	Lajos Korányi
LB	Sándor Bíró
RH	Antal Szalay
CH	József Turay
LH	Gyula Lázár
OR	Ferenc Sas
IR	Gyula Zsengellér
CF	György Sárosi (c)
IL	Géza Toldi
OL	Pál Titkos
Managers:
Károly Dietz; Alfréd Schaffer

GK	Henock Abrahamsson
RB	Ivar Eriksson
LB	Olle Källgren
RH	Erik Almgren
CH	Sven Jacobsson
LH	Kurt Svanström
OR	Arne Nyberg
IR	Sven Jonasson
CF	Harry Andersson
IL	Tore Keller (c)
OL	Gustav Wetterström
Manager:
(Hungary) József Nagy

Assistant referees:
Giuseppe Scarpi (Italy)
Johannes van Moorsel (Netherlands)

=== Italy vs Brazil ===
The narrative leading to this highly anticipated match was built around an overconfident Brazil, who had impressed in the previous three matches. However, Italy had a better start to the game, creating the best chances but finding a well-positioned Walter stopping their attacks. In the second half, Italy soon found the net with Colaussi, before being awarded a penalty following a foul in the box by Domingos da Guia, his third in the tournament. The penalty was calmly converted by Meazza. At 2–0, Brazil pushed forward to break the Italian defence, but only managed to score a goal in the 87th minute with Romeu scoring from a corner kick. Some tense moments followed, but Italy managed to hold out for the remaining time, reaching their second final in a row.

16 June 1938
18:00 WEST (UTC+01:00)

Italy	2–1	Brazil
Colaussi 51'; Meazza 60' (pen.)		Romeu 87'

Stade Vélodrome, Marseille
Attendance: 33,000
Referee: Hans Wüthrich (Switzerland)

Italy
Brazil

GK	Aldo Olivieri
RB	Alfredo Foni
LB	Pietro Rava
RH	Pietro Serantoni
CH	Michele Andreolo
LH	Ugo Locatelli
OR	Amedeo Biavati
IR	Giuseppe Meazza (c)
CF	Silvio Piola
IL	Giovanni Ferrari
OL	Gino Colaussi
Manager:
Vittorio Pozzo

GK	Walter
RB	Domingos da Guia
LB	Arthur Machado
RH	Zezé Procópio
CH	Martim (c)
LH	Afonsinho
OR	Zéca Lopes
IR	Romeu
CF	Luisinho
IL	José Perácio
OL	Patesko
Manager:
Adhemar Pimenta

Assistant referees:
Alois Beranek (Germany)
Paul Marenco (France)

== Match for third place ==
Sweden started on the front foot, taking a double lead inside 38 minutes. In the first half, Brazil looked uninspired until they got one back before half-time. In the second half, Brazil was reinvigorated and pushed for the comeback. In the second half, Leônidas scored twice while Patesko missed a penalty. José Perácio secured the victory in the 80th minute.

19 June 1938
17:00 WEST (UTC+01:00)

Brazil	4–2	Sweden
Romeu 44'; Leônidas 63', 74'; Perácio 80'		Jonasson 28'; Nyberg 38'

Parc Lescure, Bordeaux
Attendance: 12,000
Referee: John Langenus (Belgium)

Brazil
Sweden

GK	Batatais
RB	Domingos da Guia
LB	Arthur Machado
RH	Zezé Procópio
CH	Brandão
LH	Afonsinho
OR	Roberto
IR	Romeu
CF	Leônidas (c)
IL	José Perácio
OL	Patesko
Manager:
Adhemar Pimenta

GK	Henock Abrahamsson
RB	Ivar Eriksson
LB	Erik Nilsson
RH	Erik Almgren
CH	Arne Linderholm
LH	Kurt Svanström (c)
OR	Arne Nyberg
IR	Sven Jonasson
CF	Harry Andersson
IL	Åke Andersson
OL	Erik Persson
Manager:
(Hungary) József Nagy

Assistant referees:
Ferdinand Valprede (France)
Eugené Olive (France)

== Final ==
19 June 1938
17:00 (WEST)

Italy	4–2	Hungary
Colaussi 6', 35'; Piola 16', 82'		Titkos 8'; G. Sárosi 70'

Stade Olympique de Colombes, Paris
Attendance: 45,000
Referee: Georges Capdeville (France)

Italy	Hungary

GK	Aldo Olivieri
RB	Alfredo Foni
LB	Pietro Rava
RH	Pietro Serantoni
CH	Michele Andreolo
LH	Ugo Locatelli
OR	Amedeo Biavati
IR	Giuseppe Meazza (c)
CF	Silvio Piola
IL	Giovanni Ferrari
OL	Gino Colaussi
Manager:
Vittorio Pozzo

GK	Antal Szabó
RB	Sándor Bíró
LB	Gyula Polgár
RH	Gyula Lázár
CH	György Szűcs
LH	Antal Szalay
OR	Pál Titkos
IR	Gyula Zsengellér
CF	György Sárosi (c)
IL	Jenő Vincze
OL	Ferenc Sas
Manager:
Károly Dietz

Assistant referees:
Hans Wüthrich (Switzerland)
Augustin Krist (Czechoslovakia)
