= Cuba at the FIFA World Cup =

International football delegation

This is a record of Cuba's results at the FIFA World Cup. The FIFA World Cup is an international association football competition contested by the men's national teams of the members of Fédération Internationale de Football Association (FIFA), the sport's global governing body. The championship has been awarded every four years since the first tournament in 1930, except in 1942 and 1946, due to World War II.

The tournament consists of two parts, the qualification phase and the final phase (officially called the World Cup Finals). The qualification phase, which currently take place over the three years preceding the Finals, is used to determine which teams qualify for the Finals. The current format of the Finals involves 48 teams competing for the title, at venues within the host nation (or nations) over a period of about a month. The World Cup final is the most widely viewed sporting event in the world, with an estimated 715.1 million people watching the 2006 tournament final.

Cuba has appeared in the quarter-finals of the FIFA World Cup on one occasion, in 1938.

== Record at the FIFA World Cup ==
FIFA World Cup record
| Year | Round | Position | Pld | W | D* | L | GF | GA |
|---|---|---|---|---|---|---|---|---|
| (Uruguay) 1930 | Not a FIFA member | | | | | | | |
| (Italy) 1934 | Did not qualify | | | | | | | |
| (France) 1938 | Quarter-finals | 8th | 3 | 1 | 1 | 1 | 5 | 12 |
| (Brazil) 1950 | Did not qualify | | | | | | | |
| (Switzerland) 1954 | Entry not accepted | | | | | | | |
| (Sweden) 1958 | Did not enter | | | | | | | |
| (Chile) 1962 | Did not enter | | | | | | | |
| (England) 1966 | Did not qualify | | | | | | | |
| (Mexico) 1970 | Entry not accepted | | | | | | | |
| (West Germany) 1974 | Did not enter | | | | | | | |
| (Argentina) 1978 | Did not qualify | | | | | | | |
| (Spain) 1982 | Did not qualify | | | | | | | |
| (Mexico) 1986 | Did not enter | | | | | | | |
| (Italy) 1990 | Did not qualify | | | | | | | |
| (United States) 1994 | Withdrew | | | | | | | |
| (France) 1998 | Did not qualify | | | | | | | |
| (South Korea) (Japan) 2002 | Did not qualify | | | | | | | |
| (Germany) 2006 | Did not qualify | | | | | | | |
| (South Africa) 2010 | Did not qualify | | | | | | | |
| (Brazil) 2014 | Did not qualify | | | | | | | |
| (Russia) 2018 | Did not qualify | | | | | | | |
| (Qatar) 2022 | Did not qualify | | | | | | | |
| (Canada) (Mexico) (United States) 2026 | Did not qualify | | | | | | | |
| (Morocco) (Portugal) (Spain) 2030 | To be determined | | | | | | | |
| (Saudi Arabia) 2034 | To be determined | | | | | | | |
| Total | Quarter-finals | 1/22 | 3 | 1 | 1 | 1 | 5 | 12 |

*Draws include knockout matches decided via penalty shoot-out

=== By match ===
| World Cup | Round | Opponent | Score | Result | Venue | Cuba scorers |
|---|---|---|---|---|---|---|
| 1938 | Round of 16 | Romania | 3–3 (a.e.t.) | D | Toulouse | H. Socorro (2), J. Magriñá |
| 1938 | Round of 16 | Romania | 2–1 | W | Toulouse | H. Socorro, T. Fernández |
| 1938 | Quarter-finals | Sweden | 0–8 | L | Antibes | — |

== Cuba at 1938 FIFA World Cup ==
Head coach: José Tapia

| No. | Pos. | Player | Date of birth (age) | Caps | Club |
|---|---|---|---|---|---|
| - | FW | Juan Alonzo | 1911 | | (Cuba) Fortuna Havana |
| - | MF | Joaquín Arias | 12 November 1914 (aged 23) | | (Cuba) Juventud Asturiana |
| - | GK | Juan Ayra | 23 June 1911 (aged 26) | | (Cuba) CD Centro Gallego |
| - | DF | Jacinto Barquín | 3 September 1915 (aged 22) | | (Cuba) CD Puentes Grandes |
| - | MF | Pedro Berges | 1906 | | (Cuba) Iberia Havana |
| - | GK | Benito Carvajales | 1913 | | (Cuba) Juventud Asturiana |
| - | DF | Manuel Chorens | 22 January 1916 (aged 22) | | (Cuba) CD Centro Gallego |
| - | FW | Tomás Fernández | 1915 | | (Cuba) CD Centro Gallego |
| - | FW | Pedro Ferrer | 1908 | | (Cuba) Iberia Havana |
| - | MF | Arturo Garcelan | | | (Cuba) Juventud Asturiana |
| - | FW | José Magriñá | 14 December 1917 (aged 20) | | (Cuba) CD Centro Gallego |
| * | FW | Carlos Oliveira | | | (Cuba) Hispano America |
| - | MF | José Antonio Rodríguez | | | (Cuba) CD Centro Gallego |
| - | FW | Héctor Socorro | 26 June 1912 (aged 25) | | (Cuba) CD Puentes Grandes |
| - | FW | Mario Sosa | 1910 | | (Cuba) Iberia Havana |
| - | FW | Juan Tuñas | 1 February 1917 (aged 21) | | (Cuba) Juventud Asturiana |

=== First round ===
5 June 1938
17:00 (WEST)

| Cuba | 3–3 (a.e.t.) | Romania |
|---|---|---|
| Socorro 44'; Fernández 87'; Tuñas 117' | Report | Bindea 35'; Baratky 88'; Dobay 105' |

Stade du T.O.E.C., Toulouse
Attendance: 7,000
Referee: Giuseppe Scarpi (Italy)

=== First round replay ===
9 June 1938
18:00 (WEST)

| Cuba | 2–1 | Romania |
|---|---|---|
| Socorro 51'; Oliveira 57' | Report | Dobay 35' |

Stade du T.O.E.C., Toulouse
Attendance: 8,000
Referee: Alfred Birlem (Germany)

=== Quarter-final ===
12 June 1938
17:00 (WEST)

| Sweden | 8–0 | Cuba |
|---|---|---|
| Keller 9', 80', 81'; Wetterström 32', 37', 44'; Nyberg 84'; H. Andersson 90' | Report |

Stade du Fort Carré, Antibes
Attendance: 6,846
Referee: Augustin Krist (Czechoslovakia)

== Player records ==
=== Most appearances ===
Eight players were fielded in all three matches in 1938, making them record World Cup players for Cuba.

| Rank | Player | Matches |
|---|---|---|
| 1 | Joaquín Arias | 3 |
| 1 | Jacinto Barquín | 3 |
| 1 | Pedro Berges | 3 |
| 1 | Manuel Chorens | 3 |
| 1 | Tomás Fernández | 3 |
| 1 | José Rodríguez | 3 |
| 1 | Héctor Socorro | 3 |
| 1 | Juan Tuñas | 3 |

=== Goalscorers ===
On 5 June 1938, Héctor Socorro made history by scoring Cuba's first-ever FIFA World Cup goal, coming in the 44th minute of their opening match against Romania in Toulouse.

| Player | Goals | 1938 |
|---|---|---|
| Héctor Socorro | 2 | 2 |
| Tomás Fernández | 1 | 1 |
| Juan Tuñas | 1 | 1 |
| Carlos Oliveira | 1 | 1 |
| Total | 5 | 5 |

== See also ==
- Cuba at the CONCACAF Gold Cup
- North, Central American and Caribbean nations at the FIFA World Cup

== Head-to-head record ==
| Opponent | Pld | W | D | L | GF | GA | GD | Win % |
|---|---|---|---|---|---|---|---|---|
| Romania | 2 | 1 | 1 | 0 | 5 | 4 | +1 | 50.00 |
| Sweden | 1 | 0 | 0 | 1 | 0 | 8 | −8 | 0.00 |
| Total | 3 | 1 | 1 | 1 | 5 | 12 | −7 | 33.33 |
