= Battle of Bordeaux (1938 FIFA World Cup) =

1938 FIFA World Cup Quarter-final
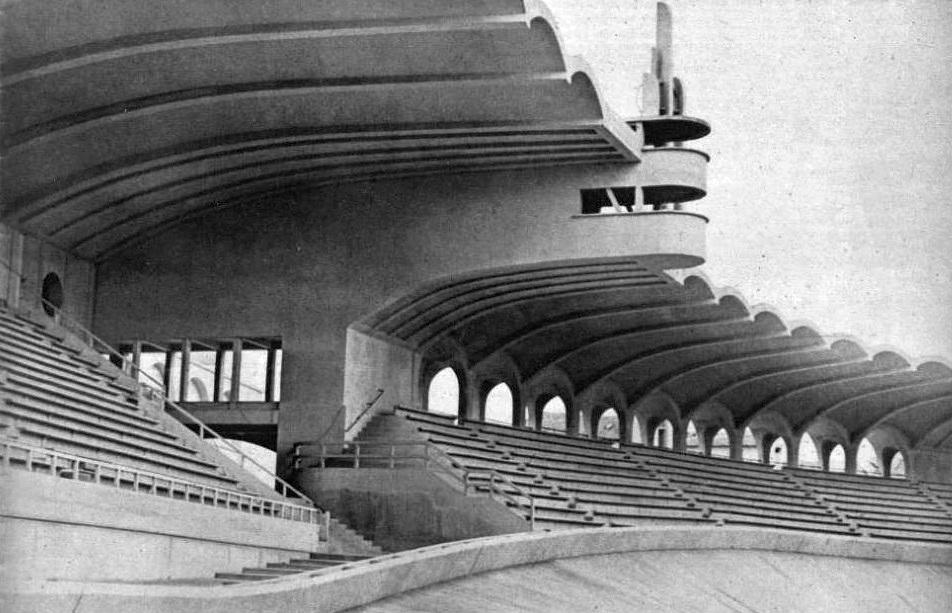
- Stade du Parc Lescure, venue
Brazil	Czechoslovakia
(Brazil)	(Czechoslovakia)
1	1
- Date: 12 June 1938
- Venue: Stade du Parc Lescure, Bordeaux
- Referee: Pál von Hertzka (Hungary)
- Attendance: 22,021

The Battle of Bordeaux (Czech: Bitva u Bordeaux, Portuguese: Batalha de Bordéus, French: Bataille de Bordeaux) is an informal name for the 1938 FIFA World Cup quarter-final tie between Brazil and Czechoslovakia on 12 June 1938 at Parc Lescure in Bordeaux, France. The match had a series of brutal fouls by both sides due to the lax officiating of Hungarian referee Pál von Hertzka.

== Match ==
=== Summary ===
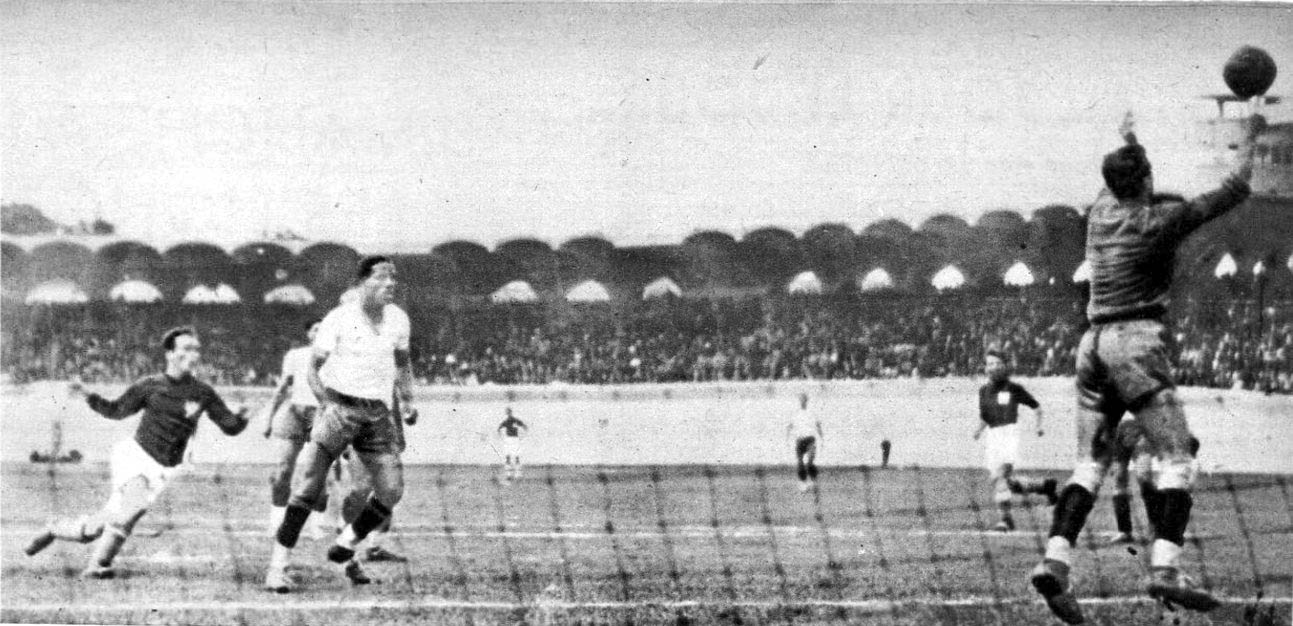
The Czechoslovak players celebrating their goal

At the match, which also opened the rebuilt Stade du Parc Lescure, Brazil took the lead 1–0, with Czechoslovakia equalizing on a penalty kick for ball handling by Domingos da Guia. Zezé Procópio was sent off after fourteen minutes, while Arthur Machado and Czechoslovakia's Jan Říha were sent off just before full time. It was the first time that three players were sent off in a World Cup match, a record that was equalled at the Battle of Berne 1954 between Hungary and Brazil, and exceeded at the 2006 World Cup match between Portugal and Netherlands. Captain František Plánička and Oldřich Nejedlý suffered a broken right arm and right leg respectively in the mayhem, while Josef Košťálek was injured in the stomach.

The match was drawn 1–1 after 90 minutes of full-time, and a 30-minute extra time had to be played. Nejedlý had been ruled out before the end of regulation time due to his injury, but Plánička stayed at the Czechoslovak goal in pain through the rest of the second half and extra time. Three other Brazilians, including Leônidas and José Perácio, also left the pitch with injuries.

=== Details ===
12 June 1938
17:00 WEST (UTC+01:00)

Brazil	1–1 (a.e.t.)	Czechoslovakia
Leônidas 30'		Nejedlý 65' (pen.)

Parc Lescure, Bordeaux
Attendance: 22,021
Referee: Pál von Hertzka (Hungary)

Brazil
Czechoslovakia

GK	Walter
RB	Domingos da Guia
LB	Arthur Machado	(red card) 89'
RH	Zezé Procópio	(red card) 14'
CH	Martim (c)
LH	Afonsinho
OR	Lopes
IR	Romeu
CF	Leônidas
IL	José Perácio
OL	Hércules
Manager:
Adhemar Pimenta

GK	František Plánička (c)
RB	Jaroslav Burgr
LB	Ferdinand Daučík
RH	Josef Košťálek
CH	Jaroslav Bouček
LH	Vlastimil Kopecký
OR	Jan Říha	(red card) 89'
IR	Ladislav Šimůnek
CF	Josef Ludl
IL	Oldřich Nejedlý
OL	Antonín Puč
Manager:
Josef Meissner

Linesmen:
Giuseppe Scarpi (Italy)
Charles de la Salle (France)

Match rules

- 90 minutes
- 30 minutes of extra time if necessary
- Replay at a later date if scores still level
- No substitutions permitted

== Aftermath ==
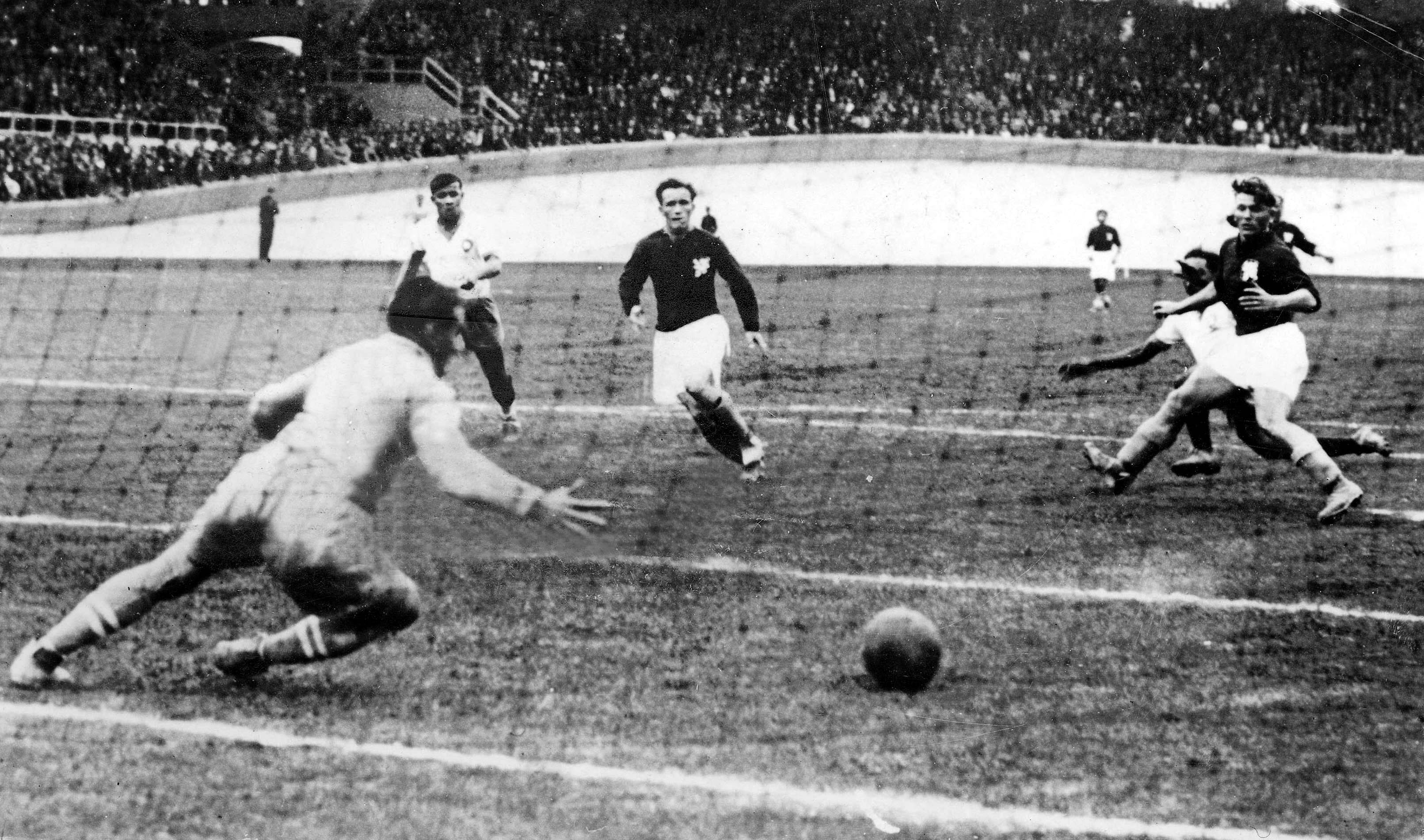
A moment of the replay

Because of the troubling effect of the first game, both teams had to make many changes to their line-ups for the replay (nine for Brazil and five for Czechoslovakia). Czechoslovakia took the lead through Vlastimil Kopecký in the 25th minute, but in the second half, stand-in captain Leônidas levelled the score for Brazil. Soon after, the referee disallowed a goal by Karel Senecký, despite the Czechoslovak players stating that it had crossed the line. The European representatives continued to attack following that moment, leaving space for the Brazilians to swiftly counter, which debutant Roberto took advantage of to score his nation's second goal. Brazil won and advanced to the semi-finals, where they faced eventual champions Italy.

== See also ==
- Battle of Berne (1954 FIFA World Cup)
- Brazil v Poland (1938 FIFA World Cup)
- Brazil at the FIFA World Cup
- Czech Republic at the FIFA World Cup
- Slovakia at the FIFA World Cup
