= 1938 FIFA World Cup qualification Group 5 =

Football tournament qualification stage

In the 1938 FIFA World Cup qualification Group 4, the two teams played against each once on neutral ground. The winner Switzerland qualified for the third FIFA World Cup held in France.

== Match ==
=== Switzerland vs Portugal ===
Switzerland	2 — 1 (final score after 90 minutes)	Portugal
Manager: (Austria) Karl Rappan Team: 01 - GK - Willy Huber; 02 - DF - Severino Minelli (capt.); 03 - DF - Adolf Stelzer; 04 - MF - Hermann Springer; 05 - MF - Sirio Vernati; 06 - MF - Ernst Lörtscher; 07 - FW - Alfred Bickel; 11 - FW - Lauro Amadò; 10 - FW - Leopold Kielholz; 08 - FW - André Abegglen; 09 - FW - Georges Aeby Substitutes: none Unused Substitutes: ? Scorers: 1-0 Georges Aeby (24'); 2-0 Lauro Amadò (29')	Half-time: 0-0 Competition: World Cup qualifier 1938 (Group 4) Date: Sunday; 1 May 1938 Kick off: ? Venue: Arena Civica, Milan ITA Attendance: 20000 Referee: Francesco Mattea ITA Assistants: ? Match rules: 90 minutes extra-time ? substitutes ?	Manager: (Portugal) Cândido de Oliveira Team: 01 - GK - João Azevedo; 02 - DF - José Simões; 03 - DF - Gustavo Teixeira (capt.); 04 - MF - Mariano Amaro; 05 - MF - Francisco Albino; 06 - MF - Carlos Pereira; 07 - FW - Adolfo Mourão; 08 - FW - Manuel Soeiro; 09 - FW - Fernando Peyroteo; 10 - FW - Pinga; 11 - FW - João Cruz Substitutes: none Unused Substitutes: ? Scorers: 2-1 Fernando Peyroteo (73', pen.)

NOTE: João Cruz missed a penalty after 55 minutes.

Switzerland qualified.

== Team stats ==
=== Switzerland ===
Head coach: (Austria) Karl Rappan

Pos.	Player	DoB	Games played	Goals	Minutes played	Sub off	Sub on	(Portugal)	Club
FW	André Abegglen	March 7, 1909	1	0	90	0	0	90	(Switzerland) Servette FC
FW	Georges Aeby	September 10, 1913	1	1	90	0	0	90	(Switzerland) Servette FC
FW	Lauro Amadò	March 15, 1912	1	1	90	0	0	90	(Switzerland) FC Lugano
FW	Alfred Bickel	May 12, 1918	1	0	90	0	0	90	(Switzerland) Grasshopper Club Zürich
GK	Willy Huber	December 17, 1913	1	0	90	0	0	90	(Switzerland) Grasshopper Club Zürich
FW	Leopold Kielholz	June 9, 1911	1	0	90	0	0	90	(Switzerland) FC St. Gallen
MF	Ernst Lörtscher	March 15, 1913	1	0	90	0	0	90	(Switzerland) Servette FC
DF	Severino Minelli	September 6, 1909	1	0	90	0	0	90	(Switzerland) Grasshopper Club Zürich
MF	Hermann Springer	December 4, 1908	1	0	90	0	0	90	(Switzerland) Grasshopper Club Zürich
DF	Adolf Stelzer	September 1, 1908	1	0	90	0	0	90	(Switzerland) Lausanne Sports
MF	Sirio Vernati	May 12, 1907	1	0	90	0	0	90	(Switzerland) Grasshopper Club Zürich

=== Portugal ===
Head coach: (Portugal) Cândido de Oliveira

Pos.	Player	DoB	Games played	Goals	Minutes played	Sub off	Sub on	(Switzerland)	Club
MF	Francisco Albino	November 2, 1912	1	0	90	0	0	90	(Portugal) S.L. Benfica
MF	Mariano Amaro	August 7, 1914	1	0	90	0	0	90	(Portugal) C.F. Os Belenenses
GK	João Azevedo	July 10, 1915	1	0	90	0	0	90	Sporting Clube de Portugal
FW	João Cruz	October 31, 1915	1	0	90	0	0	90	Sporting Clube de Portugal
FW	Adolfo Mourão	June 29, 1912	1	0	90	0	0	90	Sporting Clube de Portugal
MF	Carlos Pereira	September 3, 1910	1	0	90	0	0	90	(Portugal) F.C. Porto
FW	Fernando Peyroteo	March 10, 1918	1	1	90	0	0	90	Sporting Clube de Portugal
FW	Pinga	September 30, 1909	1	0	90	0	0	90	(Portugal) F.C. Porto
DF	José Simões	June 15, 1913	1	0	90	0	0	90	(Portugal) C.F. Os Belenenses
FW	Manuel Soeiro	March 17, 1909	1	0	90	0	0	90	Sporting Clube de Portugal
DF	Gustavo Teixeira	December 26, 1908	1	0	90	0	0	90	(Portugal) S.L. Benfica
