= 1938 FIFA World Cup final =

World Cup final, held in France

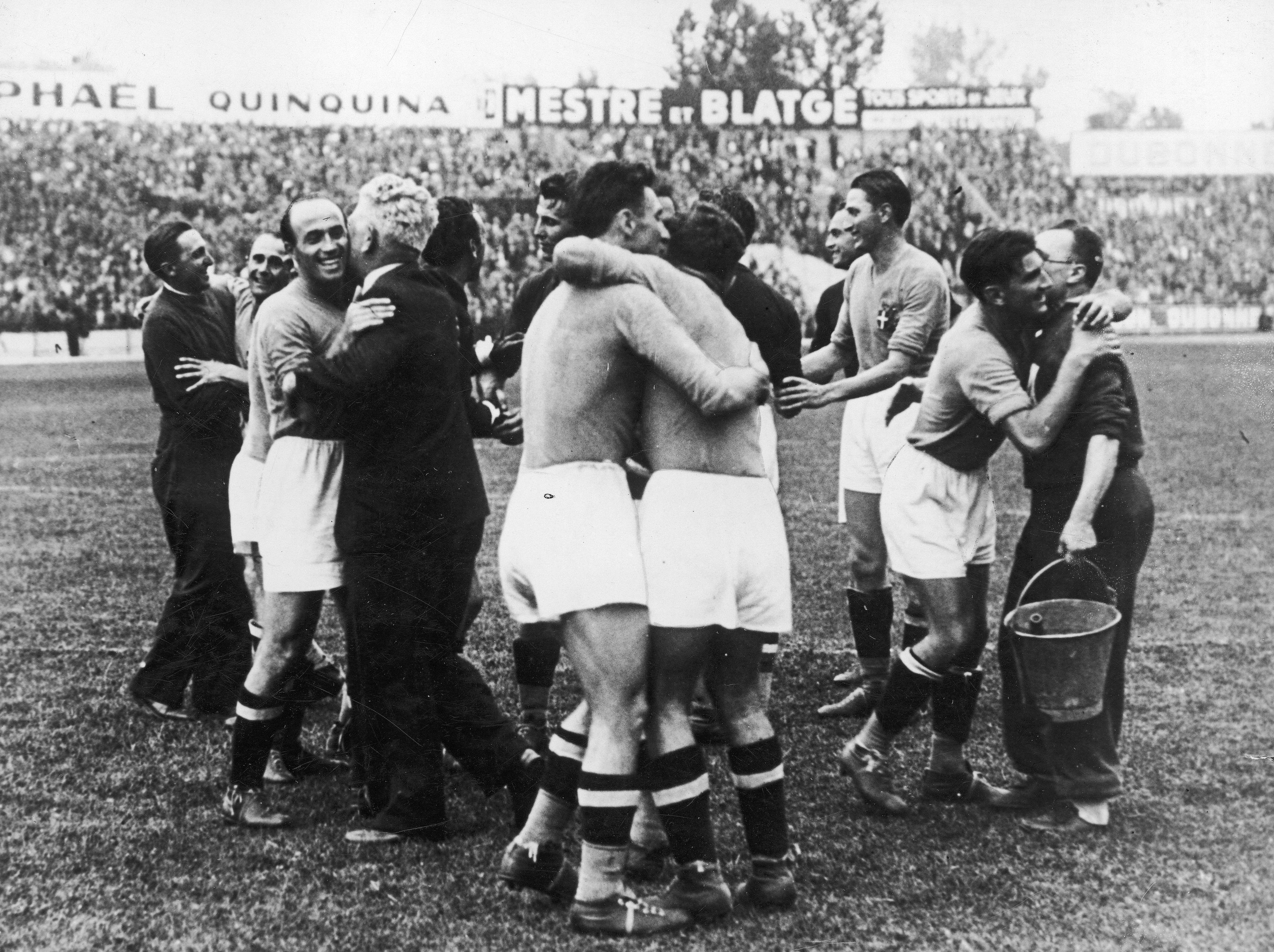
- Italy are champions
- Event: 1938 FIFA World Cup
Italy	Hungary
4	2
- Date: 19 June 1938
- Venue: Stade Olympique de Colombes, Colombes
- Referee: Georges Capdeville (France)
- Attendance: 45,000

The 1938 FIFA World Cup final was the third edition of the football quadrennial tournament match contested by the men's national teams of FIFA to determine the 1938 FIFA World Cup champions: Italy and Hungary. It was played on 19 June. Italy defended its claim to the championship 4–2 in the last tournament before World War II.

The final match took place at the Stade Olympique de Colombes in Colombes. Vittorio Pozzo's Italian side took the lead early, but Hungary equalised within two minutes. The Italians shortly regained the lead, and by the end of the first half were leading the Hungarians 3–1. At 4–2, Italy successfully defended its title, the inaugural team to win on foreign soil.

The last survivor of the game was Italy's Pietro Rava, who died on 5 November 2006 at the age of 90.

== Route to the final ==
Italy		Round	Hungary
Opponent	Result	Final tournament	Opponent	Result
Norway	2–1 (a.e.t.)	First round	Dutch East Indies	6–0
France	3–1	Quarter-finals	Switzerland	2–0
Brazil	2–1	Semi-finals	Sweden	5–1

== Match ==
=== Summary ===
After six minutes, Gino Colaussi opened the scoring for Italy; Pál Titkos equalised for Hungary two minutes later, but with just over a quarter of an hour played, Italy regained the lead with a goal from Silvio Piola. Ten minutes before half-time, Italy extended their lead to 3–1 after the unmarked Colaussi scored his second goal. Midway through the second half, Hungary captain György Sárosi got his side back to within a goal of the Italians, but with eight minutes to go, Piola scored his second goal to complete a 4–2 win for Italy.

=== Details ===
19 June 1938
17:00 (WEST)

Italy	4–2	Hungary
Colaussi 6', 35'; Piola 16', 82'		Titkos 8'; G. Sárosi 70'

Stade Olympique de Colombes, Paris
Attendance: 45,000
Referee: Georges Capdeville (France)

Italy	Hungary

GK	Aldo Olivieri
RB	Alfredo Foni
LB	Pietro Rava
RH	Pietro Serantoni
CH	Michele Andreolo
LH	Ugo Locatelli
OR	Amedeo Biavati
IR	Giuseppe Meazza (c)
CF	Silvio Piola
IL	Giovanni Ferrari
OL	Gino Colaussi
Manager:
Vittorio Pozzo

GK	Antal Szabó
RB	Sándor Bíró
LB	Gyula Polgár
RH	Gyula Lázár
CH	György Szűcs
LH	Antal Szalay
OR	Pál Titkos
IR	Gyula Zsengellér
CF	György Sárosi (c)
IL	Jenő Vincze
OL	Ferenc Sas
Manager:
Károly Dietz

Assistant referees:
Hans Wüthrich (Switzerland)
Augustin Krist (Czechoslovakia)

Match rules

- 90 minutes
- 30 minutes of extra time if necessary
- Replay if scores still level
- No substitutions permitted

== See also ==
- Hungary at the FIFA World Cup
- Italy at the FIFA World Cup
