= Chorens =

Chorens is a surname. Notable people with the surname include:

- Manuel Chorens (1916–?), Cuban footballer
- Olga Chorens (1924–2023), Cuban singer and actress
