= Vernati =

Vernati is a surname of Italian origin. Notable people with the surname include:

- Marisa Vernati (1920–1988), Italian actress
- Sirio Vernati (1907–1993), Swiss footballer

== See also ==
- Vernate (disambiguation)
