= Willy Huber =

Swiss footballer (1913–1998)

Personal information
- Full name: Wilhelm Huber
- Date of birth: 17 December 1913
- Place of birth: Zurich, Switzerland
- Date of death: August 1998 (aged 84)
- Place of death: Küsnacht, Switzerland
- Position: Goalkeeper

Senior career*
Years	Team	Apps	(Gls)
1934–1943	Grasshopper Club Zürich		

International career
1933–1942	Switzerland	16	(0)
- * Club domestic league appearances and goals

Wilhelm Huber, best known as Willy Huber (17 December 1913 – August 1998) was a Swiss football goalkeeper who played for Switzerland in the FIFA World Cup in 1934 and 1938. He also played for Grasshopper Club Zürich. He was Switzerland's Goalkeeper of the Year in 1937, 1942 and 1943.

== Career ==
Huber played for FC La Sarraz and for FC Blue Stars Zürich before he played for Grasshopper Club Zürich, with whom he won the Swiss championship in 1936–37, 1938–39, 1941–42 and 1942–43 and the Swiss Cup in 1933–34, 1936–37, 1937–38, 1939–40, 1940–41, 1941–42, 1942–43, thus winning the double in 1936–37, 1941–42 and 1942–43. Only Severino Minelli and Alfred Bickel, with eight victories each, have won the cup more often than his seven cup victories, and otherwise only Hermann Springer has equalled this total.

He ended his career at FC Zürich.
