= Joaquín Arias =

Joaquín Arias may refer to:

- Joaquín Arias (baseball) (born 1984), Dominican baseball player
- Joaquín Arias (footballer) (1914–?), Cuban football player
