= Vernate =

Vernate may refer to:

- Vernate, Lombardy, in Italy
- Vernate, Ticino, in Switzerland

== See also ==
- Vernati, an Italian surname
