= Jakob Streitle =

German footballer (1916–1982)

Personal information
- Date of birth: 11 December 1916
- Place of birth: German Empire
- Date of death: 24 June 1982 (aged 65)
- Position: Defender

Youth career
- Wacker München

Senior career*
Years	Team	Apps	(Gls)
1936–1954	Bayern Munich		

International career
1938–1941	Germany	8	(0)
1950–1952	West Germany	7	(0)

Managerial career
- 1954–1955: Bayern Munich
- * Club domestic league appearances and goals

Jakob Streitle (11 December 1916 – 24 June 1982) was a German footballer. During the course of his career, he played as a defender for Bayern Munich.

He was capped by the Germany national team a total of 15 times between 1938 and 1952. Streitle was a member of the German squad that took part in the FIFA World Cup 1938 in France, where he made his international debut in the round of 16 replay against Switzerland.

During World War II, Streitle served as an officer in the German Army.
