= Cuba at the CONCACAF Gold Cup =

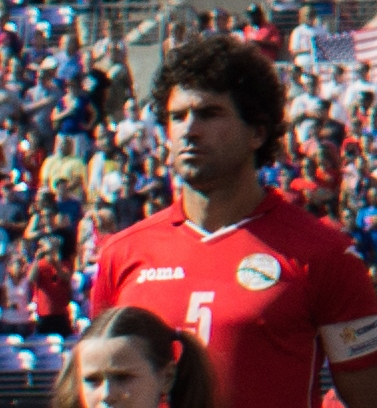
Defender Jorge Luis Clavelo represented Cuba at four CONCACAF Gold Cups, here as captain before the quarter-final against the United States in 2015.

The CONCACAF Gold Cup is North America's major tournament in senior men's football and determines the continental champion. Until 1989, the tournament was known as CONCACAF Championship. It is currently held every two years. From 1996 to 2005, nations from other confederations have regularly joined the tournament as invitees. In earlier editions, the continental championship was held in different countries, but since the inception of the Gold Cup in 1991, the United States are constant hosts or co-hosts.

From 1973 to 1989, the tournament doubled as the confederation's World Cup qualification. CONCACAF's representative team at the FIFA Confederations Cup was decided by a play-off between the winners of the last two tournament editions in 2015 via the CONCACAF Cup, but was then discontinued along with the Confederations Cup.

Since the inaugural tournament in 1963, the Gold Cup was held 28 times and has been won by seven different nations, most often by Mexico (13 titles).

Cuba have participated in the continental championship twelve times, but only won five out of their 40 matches, never more than one at a single tournament. Their best position was a fourth place in 1971. They rank 14th in the tournament's all-time table, but have the worst goal difference out of all 31 teams (−91).

== Record at the CONCACAF Championship/Gold Cup ==
CONCACAF Championship
Year	Result	Position	Pld	W	D	L	GF	GA
(El Salvador) 1963	Did not enter							
(Guatemala) 1965	Withdrew							
(Honduras) 1967	Did not qualify							
(Costa Rica) 1969	Did not enter							
(Trinidad and Tobago) 1971	Fourth place	4th	5	1	2	2	5	7
(Haiti) 1973	Did not enter							
(Mexico) 1977	Did not qualify							
(Honduras) 1981	Final Round	5th	5	1	2	2	4	8
1985	Did not enter							
1989	Did not qualify							
CONCACAF Gold Cup
(United States) 1991	Withdrew							
(Mexico) (United States) 1993	Did not enter							
(United States) 1996	Did not qualify							
(United States) 1998	Group stage	10th	2	0	0	2	2	10
(United States) 2000	Did not qualify							
(United States) 2002	Group stage	11th	2	0	1	1	0	1
(Mexico) (United States) 2003	Quarter-finals	8th	3	1	0	2	2	8
(United States) 2005	Group stage	12th	3	0	0	3	3	9
(United States) 2007	Group stage	12th	3	0	1	2	3	9
(United States) 2009	Withdrew							
(United States) 2011	Group stage	12th	3	0	0	3	1	16
(United States) 2013	Quarter-finals	8th	4	1	0	3	6	13
(Canada) (United States) 2015	Quarter-finals	8th	4	1	0	3	1	14
(United States) 2017	Did not qualify							
(United States) (Costa Rica) (Jamaica) 2019	Group stage	16th	3	0	0	3	0	17
(United States) 2021	Withdrew							
(Canada) (United States) 2023	Group stage	15th	3	0	0	3	3	9
(Canada) (United States) 2025	Did not qualify							
Total	12/28	14/33	40	5	6	29	30	121

=== Match overview ===
Tournament	Round	Opponent	Score	Venue
(Trinidad and Tobago) 1971	Final round	Costa Rica	0–3	Port of Spain
(Trinidad and Tobago) 1971	Final round	Honduras	3–1	Port of Spain
(Trinidad and Tobago) 1971	Final round	Mexico	0–1	Port of Spain
(Trinidad and Tobago) 1971	Final round	Trinidad and Tobago	2–2	Port of Spain
(Trinidad and Tobago) 1971	Final round	Haiti	0–0	Port of Spain
(Honduras) 1981	Final round	Mexico	0–4	Tegucigalpa
(Honduras) 1981	Final round	Honduras	0–2	Tegucigalpa
(Honduras) 1981	Final round	El Salvador	0–0	Tegucigalpa
(Honduras) 1981	Final round	Haiti	2–0	Tegucigalpa
(Honduras) 1981	Final round	Canada	2–2	Tegucigalpa
(United States) 1998	Group stage	United States	0–3	Oakland
(United States) 1998	Group stage	Costa Rica	2–7	Oakland
(United States) 2002	Group stage	United States	0–1	Pasadena
(United States) 2002	Group stage	South Korea	0–0	Pasadena
(United States) (Mexico) 2003	Group stage	Canada	2–0	Foxboro
(United States) (Mexico) 2003	Group stage	Costa Rica	0–3	Foxboro
(United States) (Mexico) 2003	Quarter-finals	United States	0–5	Foxboro
(United States) 2005	Group stage	United States	1–4	Seattle
(United States) 2005	Group stage	Costa Rica	1–3	Seattle
(United States) 2005	Group stage	Canada	1–2	Foxboro
(United States) 2007	Group stage	Mexico	1–2	East Rutherford
(United States) 2007	Group stage	Panama	2–2	East Rutherford
(United States) 2007	Group stage	Honduras	0–5	Houston
(United States) 2011	Group stage	Costa Rica	0–5	Arlington
(United States) 2011	Group stage	Mexico	0–5	Charlotte
(United States) 2011	Group stage	El Salvador	1–6	Chicago
(United States) 2013	Group stage	Costa Rica	0–3	Portland
(United States) 2013	Group stage	United States	1–4	Sandy
(United States) 2013	Group stage	Belize	4–0	East Hartford
(United States) 2013	Quarter-finals	Panama	1–6	Atlanta
(United States) (Canada) 2015	Group stage	Mexico	0–6	Chicago
(United States) (Canada) 2015	Group stage	Trinidad and Tobago	0–2	Glendale
(United States) (Canada) 2015	Group stage	Guatemala	1–0	Charlotte
(United States) (Canada) 2015	Quarter-finals	United States	0–6	Baltimore
(United States) (Costa Rica) (Jamaica) 2019	Group stage	Mexico	0–7	Pasadena
(United States) (Costa Rica) (Jamaica) 2019	Group stage	Martinique	0–3	Denver
(United States) (Costa Rica) (Jamaica) 2019	Group stage	Canada	0–7	Charlotte
(United States) (Canada) 2023	Group stage	Guatemala	0–1	Fort Lauderdale
(United States) (Canada) 2023	Group stage	Guadeloupe	1–4	Houston
(United States) (Canada) 2023	Group stage	Canada	2–4	Houston

=== Record by opponent ===
CONCACAF Championship/Gold Cup matches (by team)
Opponent	W	D	L	Pld	GF	GA
Belize	1	0	0	1	4	0
Canada	1	1	3	5	7	15
Costa Rica	0	0	6	6	3	24
El Salvador	0	1	1	2	1	6
Guadeloupe	0	0	1	1	1	4
Guatemala	1	0	1	2	1	1
Haiti	1	1	0	2	2	0
Honduras	1	0	2	3	3	8
Martinique	0	0	1	1	0	3
Mexico	0	0	6	6	1	25
Panama	0	1	1	2	3	8
South Korea	0	1	0	1	0	0
Trinidad and Tobago	0	1	1	2	2	4
United States	0	0	6	6	2	23

== Defections to the United States ==
The Gold Cups on US-American soil allowed the Cuban players to get visas for the duration of the tournament. The wet feet, dry feet policy established in 1995 essentially allowed Cuban refugees in the United States to qualify for permanent resident status. The policy and the dream of making a career as a professional footballer, at a much higher level than the Cuban top division made a defection to the United States an attractive option, which some of them took. Until the policy's cessation in 2017, the following Cuban internationals defected during the tournament:

- Rey Ángel Martínez and Alberto Delgado in 2002.
- Maykel Galindo in 2005.
- Osvaldo Alonso and Lester Moré in 2007.
- Yosniel Mesa in 2011.
- Keyler García, Arael Argüellez, Darío Suárez and Ariel Martínez in 2015.

== See also ==
- Cuba at the FIFA World Cup
