= Gyula Lázár =

Hungarian footballer and manager

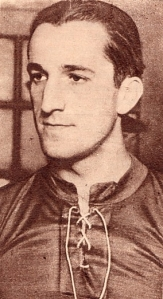
- Lázár Gyula

Personal information
- Full name: Gyula Lázár
- Date of birth: 8 February 1911
- Place of birth: Füzesgyarmat, Austria-Hungary
- Date of death: 27 February 1983 (aged 72)
- Place of death: Budapest, Hungary
- Position: Midfielder

Senior career*
Years	Team	Apps	(Gls)
- Ferencváros TC

International career
1931–1941	Hungary	49	(1)

Managerial career
- 1964: Iraklis Thessaloniki
Medal record
Representing Hungary
FIFA World Cup
Runner-up	1938 France
- * Club domestic league appearances and goals

Gyula Lázár (8 February 1911 – 27 February 1983) was a Hungarian footballer. He played for the Hungary national team a total of 49 times between 1931 and 1941.

Lazar was in the Hungarian squad for both the 1934 and 1938 World Cups. He played one game in the 1934 tournament, but in 1938 he played in 4 games, including the final against Italy.

At the time of the 1938 tournament he was playing his club football with Ferencváros TC.
