= Sándor Bíró =

Hungarian footballer

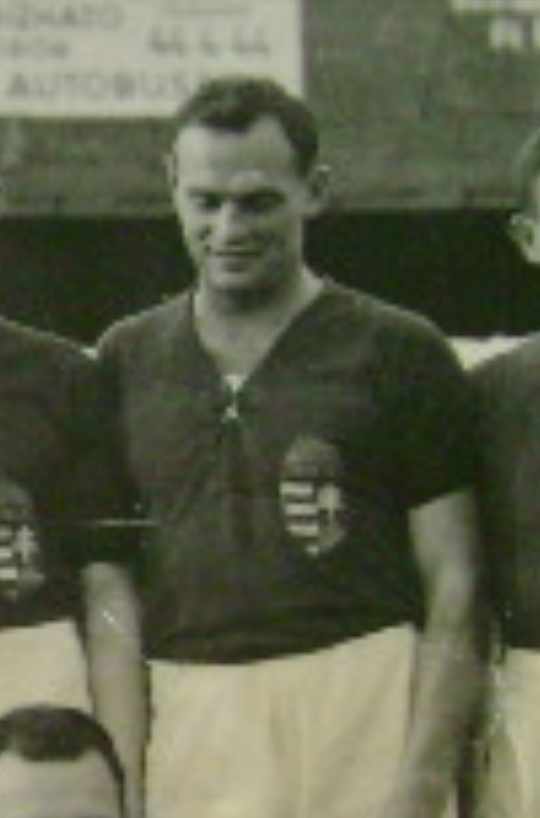
- Sándor Bíró ca. 1936-1938.

Personal information
- Date of birth: 19 August 1911
- Place of birth: Füzesabony, Hungary
- Date of death: 7 October 1988 (aged 77)
- Place of death: Budapest, Hungary
- Position: Defender

Senior career*
Years	Team	Apps	(Gls)
- MTK Hungária

International career
1932–1946	Hungary	54	(0)
Medal record
Representing Hungary
FIFA World Cup
Runner-up	1938 France
- * Club domestic league appearances and goals

Sándor Bíró (19 August 1911 – 7 October 1988) was a Hungarian international footballer who played as a defender.

He played for the Hungary national team 54 times between 1932 and 1946, and he played in all four Hungarian matches in the 1938 FIFA World Cup, including the final against Italy.

Between July 1933 and June 1938 he played his club football for MTK Hungária. After the 1938 World Cup, he played in a friendly for Hungary against Scotland on 7 December 1938.
