= Frans Alfred Meeng =

Indonesian footballer

Personal information
- Date of birth: 18 January 1910
- Place of birth: Palembang, Dutch East Indies
- Date of death: 18 September 1944 (aged 34)
- Position: Midfielder

Senior career*
Years	Team	Apps	(Gls)
- SVVB Batavia

International career
- Dutch East Indies
- * Club domestic league appearances and goals

Frans Alfred Meeng (18 January 1910 – 18 September 1944) was an Indonesian football midfielder who played for the Dutch East Indies in the 1938 FIFA World Cup. He also played for SVVB Batavia.

A corporal in the Netherlands Marine Corps in World War II who became a prisoner-of-war of the Japanese, he died along with thousands of others when the Japanese cargo ship Jun'yō Maru sank after being torpedoed by the British submarine HMS Tradewind.
