= Hector Cazenave =

French footballer (1914-1958)

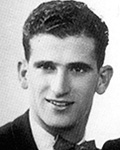

Personal information
- Full name: Hector Cazenave
- Date of birth: 13 April 1914
- Place of birth: Montevideo, Uruguay
- Date of death: 27 September 1958 (aged 44)
- Height: 1.80 m (5 ft 11 in)
- Position: Defender

Senior career*
Years	Team	Apps	(Gls)
1934–36	Defensor Sporting	47	(2)
1936–39	FC Sochaux-Montbéliard	68	(1)
1940–43	Defensor Sporting	68	(2)

International career
1937–38	France	8	(0)
- * Club domestic league appearances and goals

Héctor Cazenave (13 April 1914 in Montevideo – 27 September 1958) was a French footballer. He played for Peñarol, Defensor Sporting Club and FC Sochaux-Montbéliard. Born in Uruguay, Cazenave represented the France national football team.

== International career ==
Born in Uruguay to French parents, Cazenave earned 8 caps for the France national football team, and played in the 1938 FIFA World Cup.
