= Karel Burkert =

Czechoslovak footballer (1909–1991)

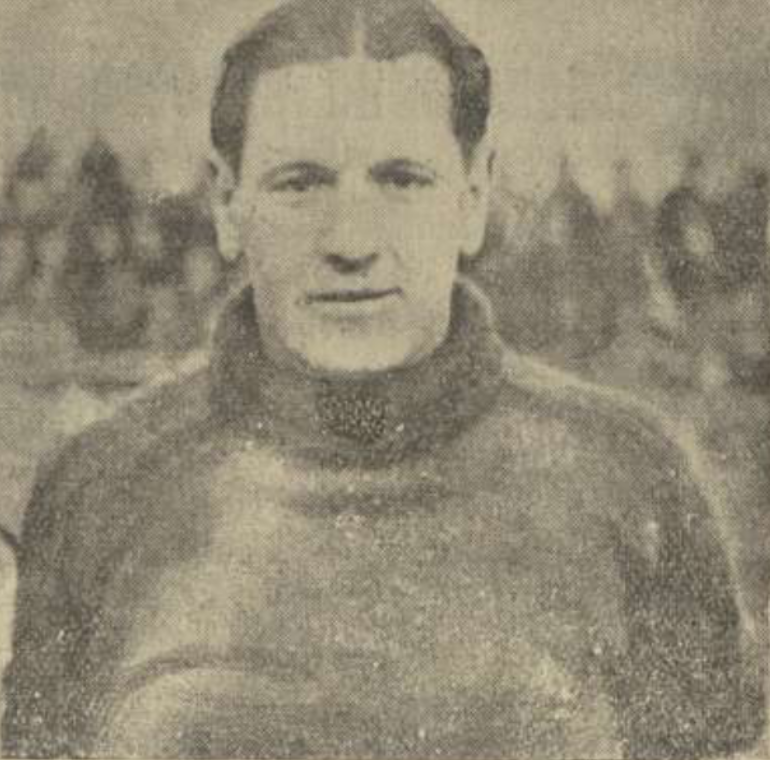

Personal information
- Date of birth: 1 December 1909
- Place of birth: Újpest
- Date of death: 26 March 1991 (aged 81)
- Position: Goalkeeper

Senior career*
Years	Team	Apps	(Gls)
1933–1934	Levski Sofia	7	(0)
1934–1940	SK Židenice	105	(0)
1941–1946	SK Borovina Třebíč		

International career
1934	Bulgaria	1	(0)
1934–1938	Czechoslovakia	5	(0)
1939	Bohemia and Moravia	1	(0)
- * Club domestic league appearances and goals

Karel Burkert (1 December 1909 – 26 March 1991) was a Czechoslovak football goalkeeper who played for Czechoslovakia in the 1938 FIFA World Cup. Burkert played in the Czechoslovak First League for SK Židenice, making 105 appearances between 1934 and 1940. He also made five appearances for Czechoslovakia between 1934 and 1938, as well as playing a game for Bohemia and Moravia after the Czechoslovakia team was disbanded, in 1939.
