= Argemiro =

Brazilian footballer (1915-1975)

Personal information
- Full name: Argemiro Pinheiro da Silva
- Date of birth: 3 June 1916
- Place of birth: Ribeirão Preto, Brazil
- Date of death: 4 July 1975 (aged 60)
- Height: 1.74 m (5 ft 8 1/2 in)
- Position: Midfielder

Senior career*
Years	Team	Apps	(Gls)
1931–1935	Rio Preto		
1935–1938	Portuguesa Santista		
1938–1945	Vasco da Gama		

International career
1938–1942	Brazil		
Medal record
Representing Brazil
FIFA World Cup
Third place	1938 France
- * Club domestic league appearances and goals

Argemiro Pinheiro da Silva known as Argemiro (3 June 1916 – 4 July 1975) was a Brazilian football player. He played for the Brazil national team at the 1938 FIFA World Cup finals.
