= Ferenc Sas =

Hungarian footballer

Personal information
- Full name: Ferenc Sohn
- Date of birth: 16 August 1915
- Place of birth: Budapest
- Date of death: 3 September 1988 (aged 73)
- Place of death: Buenos Aires
- Position: Right winger

Senior career*
Years	Team	Apps	(Gls)
1934–1938	Hungária MTK FC	334	(56)
1939–1940	Boca Juniors	28	(9)
1943–1945	Argentinos Juniors	74	(12)
Total		436	(77)

International career
1936–1938	Hungary	17	(2)

Managerial career
- 1953?: Macabi
Medal record
Representing Hungary
FIFA World Cup
Runner-up	1938 France
- * Club domestic league appearances and goals

Ferenc Sas (16 August 1915 – 3 September 1988), born as Ferenc Sohn, in Argentina known as Francisco "Sas" Sohn, was a Hungarian football player. With the Hungary he played in the final of the World Cup 1938. With Hungária MTK FC and CA Boca Juniors he won national championships.

== Life ==
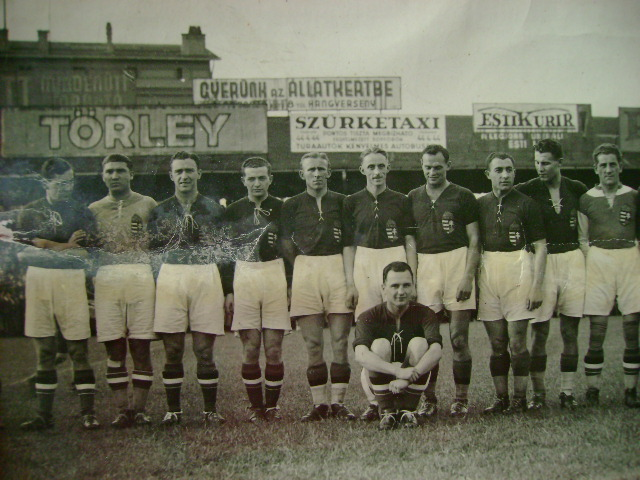
Hungarian national team, with Ferenc Sas (right) (image from his estate)

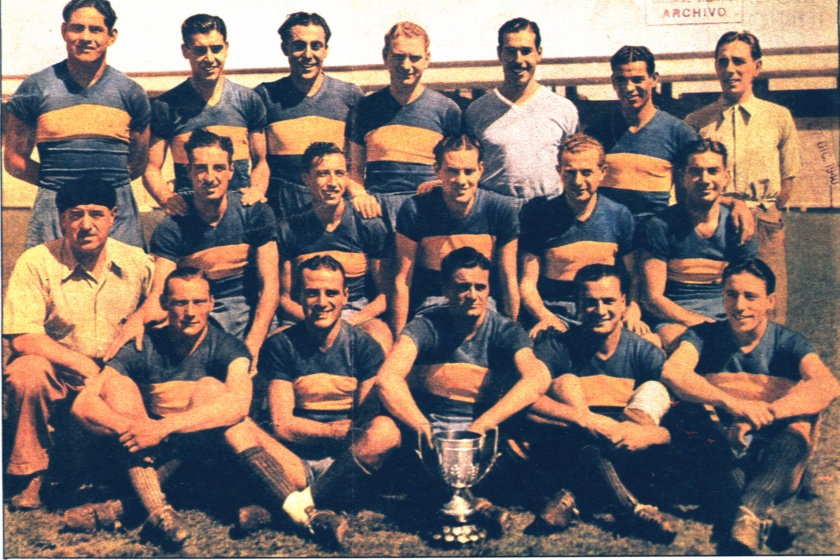
Boca Juniors, champions 1940. Francisco Sohn "Sas" is second from the right in the middle row

Ferenc Sas was born as the son of Leopold, who fell in World War I, and Roza Sohn. His parents were Jewish. He later hungarised his name, selecting "Sas", the Hungarian word for "Eagle", in order to get easier access to the Hungarian national team.

The right winger debuted in 1934 with Hungária FC, today's MTK Budapest. He impressed with his speed and technical abilities, one-on-ones were not his strength. He played in the front row alongside Pál Titkos and the Austrian Heinrich "Wudi" Müller in the team coached by Alfréd Schaffer that won the Hungarian Championships of 1936 and 1937.

In April 1936 Sas played for the first time for the national team, alongside Jenö Vincze on the right outfield, defeating Austria 5–3. A few days later in a match against Ireland he scores his first goal for the Magyars. Sas remained part of the Hungarian standard formation for the next two years.

In 1937 he was part of a Central-European selection that played in Amsterdam against a Western-European XI. In this match, which was organised by FIFA, he contributed with assists from György Sárosi and Italy's Silvio Piola two goals to the 3–1 victory of his side.

In 1938 he participated with Hungary at the World Cup in France. After 6–0 and 2–0 wins against Dutch East Indies (today's Indonesia) and Switzerland, Hungary, coached by Alfréd Schaffer, defeated Sweden in the semi-final 5–1. Despite the support of the majority of the crowd, in the final Hungary had little chance against Italy, led by Giuseppe Meazza and Silvio Piola, arguably two of the greatest players of the era, and lost 2–4.

After the World Cup he migrated to Argentina. In December 1938 he debuted in a friendly for CA Boca Juniors. In the ensuing season he played 24 matches for the Juniors, scoring 9 goals, sharing the club's top scorer honours with two other players. The following season, he won the championship of Argentina. Sas, now called Francisco Sohn, however faced strong competition within the team and only played four league matches in that season. A friendly in March 1941 was his last match for Boca Juniors.

From the beginning of 1943 he played for three seasons in the second division with Argentinos Juniors. There he scored 12 goals in 72 matches. He continued to play at amateur level with Macabi, where he also coached. He also coached at the Colegio David Wolfsohn.

In Argentina he married his fiancé who followed him from Hungary with whom he shared a son and three grandchildren. In later years he worked for the renown clothing store Raitor, cinemas and a jeweller's store.
