= Corneel Seys =

Belgian footballer

Cornelius Seys
Personal information
- Date of birth: 12 February 1912
- Place of birth: Antwerp (Belgium)
- Date of death: 10 January 1944 (aged 31)

Senior career*
Years	Team	Apps	(Gls)
1930–1943	Beerschot VAC		

International career
1938	Belgium	2	(0)
- * Club domestic league appearances and goals

Corneel "Neel" Seys (12 February 1912 – 10 January 1944) was a Belgian footballer. He was born in Antwerp.

He was a defender for Beerschot VAC from 1930 to 1943. With the Antwerp team, he twice won the Belgian First Division, in 1938 and 1939.

He played twice for the Diables Rouges, including one match at the 1938 World Cup.

== Honours ==
- International in 1938 (2 caps)
- Participation in the 1938 World Cup (played 1 match)
- Champion of Belgium in 1938 and 1939 with Beerschot VAC
