= Sutan Anwar =

Indonesian footballer

Anwar Sutan
Personal information
- Date of birth: 21 March 1914
- Place of birth: Padang, Dutch East Indies (now Indonesia)
- Date of death: unknown
- Position: Midfielder

Senior career*
Years	Team	Apps	(Gls)
- VIOS Batavia

International career
- Dutch East Indies
- * Club domestic league appearances and goals

Anwar Sutan (born 21 March 1914, date of death unknown) was an Indonesian football midfielder who played for the Dutch East Indies in the 1938 FIFA World Cup. He also played for VIOS Batavia. He has Minangkabau blood from his parents in West Sumatera. Sutan is deceased.
