= Frans G. Hukom =

Indonesian footballer

Frederikus Gerardus Hukom
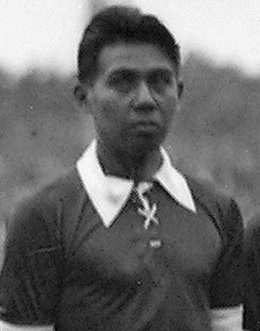

Personal information
- Date of birth: 28 September 1915
- Place of birth: Makassar Dutch East Indies
- Date of death: 3 July 1989 (aged 73)
- Position: Defender

Senior career*
Years	Team	Apps	(Gls)
1934—1945	Sparta Bandung		

International career
1938	Dutch East Indies	2	(0)
- * Club domestic league appearances and goals

Frederikus (Fred) Gerardus Hukom (28 September 1915 – 3 July 1989) was an Indonesian football defender who played for the Dutch East Indies in the 1938 FIFA World Cup. He also played for Sparta Bandung.

== Honours ==
VBBO (Voetbalbond Bandoeng en Omstreken)

- Dutch East Indies Championship: 1937
