= Arturo Galceran =

Cuban footballer

Arturo Galcerán
Personal information
- Full name: Arturo Galcerán Nogués
- Place of birth: Cuba
- Position: Midfielder

Senior career*
Years	Team	Apps	(Gls)
- Juventud Asturiana

International career
- Cuba
- * Club domestic league appearances and goals

Arturo Galcerán Nogués (date of birth and death unknowns) was a Cuban football midfielder who played for Cuba in the 1938 FIFA World Cup. He also played for Juventud Asturiana. Galcerán is deceased.
