= Carlos Oliveira (footballer) =

Cuban footballer

Personal information
- Full name: Carlos Oliveira Hernández
- Place of birth: Cuba
- Position: Forward

Senior career*
Years	Team	Apps	(Gls)
- Hispano America

International career
- Cuba
- * Club domestic league appearances and goals

Carlos Oliveira Hernández (date of birth and death unknown) was a Cuban footballer.

He represented Cuba at the 1938 FIFA World Cup in France. Oliveira is deceased.
