= José Magriñá =

Cuban footballer

Personal information
- Full name: José Antonio Magriñá Rodeiro
- Date of birth: December 14, 1917
- Place of birth: Cuba
- Date of death: August 2, 1988 (aged 70)
- Position: Forward

International career
Years	Team	Apps	(Gls)
- Cuba

José Antonio Magriñá Rodeiro (14 December 1917 – 2 August 1988) was a Cuban footballer.

== International career ==
He represented Cuba at the 1938 FIFA World Cup, scoring a goal against Romania.
