= Juan Alonzo =

Cuban footballer (born 1911)

Personal information
- Full name: Juan Alberto Alonzo López
- Date of birth: 24 June 1911
- Place of birth: Cuba
- Position: Forward

Senior career*
Years	Team	Apps	(Gls)
- Fortuna Havana

International career
- Cuba
- * Club domestic league appearances and goals

Juan Alberto Alonzo López (born 24 June 1911, date of death unknown) was a Cuban footballer.

Alonzo represented Cuba at the 1938 FIFA World Cup in France. In his only match in the World Cup, Cuba lost to Sweden 0-8. Alonzo is deceased.
