= Jaroslav Bouček =

Czech footballer

Personal information
- Date of birth: 13 November 1912
- Place of birth: Černošice, Austria-Hungary
- Date of death: 10 October 1987 (aged 74)
- Place of death: Prague, Czechoslovakia
- Position: Midfielder

Senior career*
Years	Team	Apps	(Gls)
1930–1931	AC Sparta Prague		
1931–1933	Stade Rennais FC	45	(2)
1933–1941	AC Sparta Prague		
1941–1942	FC Viktoria Plzeň		

International career
1934–1938	Czechoslovakia	28	(1)
1939	Bohemia and Moravia	3	(0)
Medal record
Representing Czechoslovakia
Men's Football
FIFA World Cup
Runner-up	1934 Italy
- * Club domestic league appearances and goals

Jaroslav Bouček (13 November 1912 – 10 October 1987) was a Czech footballer. He won four league titles with AC Sparta Prague in the 1930s. He also played club football for FC Viktoria Plzeň and French side Stade Rennais FC. Internationally Bouček played for Czechoslovakia.

He earned a total of 31 international caps, scoring 1 goal, from 1934 to 1939. He was part of the squad that finished as runners-up in the 1934 FIFA World Cup, but did not play in the tournament. Four years later, he played in the 1938 FIFA World Cup.
