= Adhemar Pimenta =

Brazilian football manager

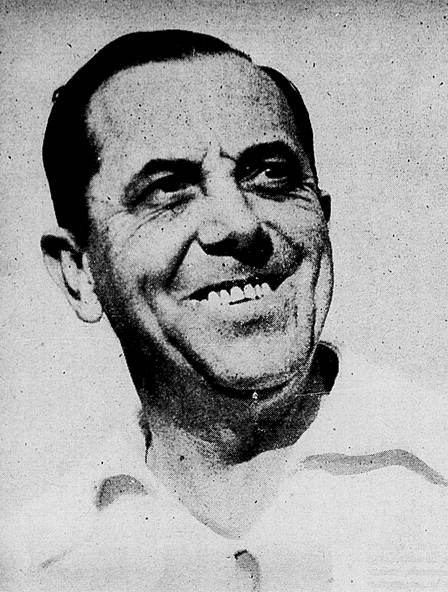

Personal information
- Date of birth: 12 April 1896
- Place of birth: Rio de Janeiro, Brazil
- Date of death: 26 August 1970 (aged 74)
- Place of death: Rio de Janeiro, Brazil

Managerial career
- Years: Team
- 1934–1936: Bangu AC
- 1935: XI of Rio de Janeiro (DF)
- 1936–1937: Madureira AC
- 1936–1937: São Cristóvão AC
- 1936–1938: Brazil
- 1939: Madureira AC
- 1939: XI of Pernambuco
- 1940–1942: Botafogo FC
- 1942: Brazil
- 1943: Santos FC
- 1943: Bonsucesso FC
- 1943: XI of Minas Gerais
- 1945: Bonsucesso FC
- 1947: São Cristóvão AC
- 1948: America FC (RJ)

Adhemar Pimenta (1896–1970) was a Brazilian football manager.

He was born in Rio de Janeiro on April 12, 1896, and died in the same city on August 26, 1970.
