= Benito Carvajales =

Cuban footballer

Benito Carbajales
Personal information
- Full name: Benito Carbajales Pérez
- Date of birth: 25 July 1913
- Place of birth: Orense, Spain
- Height: 1.86 m (6 ft 1 in)
- Position: Goalkeeper

Senior career*
Years	Team	Apps	(Gls)
- Juventud Asturiana

International career
1938	Cuba	2	(1)
- * Club domestic league appearances and goals

Benito Carbajales Pérez (born 25 July 1913, date of death unknown) was a Cuban footballer, who played as a goalkeeper. He was born in Orense. Carbajales is deceased.

== International career ==
Carbajales represented Cuba at the 1938 FIFA World Cup in France. Carbajales appeared in two matches.
