= Juan Ayra =

Cuban footballer (1911–2008)

Personal information
- Full name: Juan José Ayra Martínez
- Date of birth: June 23, 1911
- Place of birth: Guantánamo, Cuba
- Date of death: October 26, 2008 (aged 97)
- Position: Goalkeeper

Senior career*
Years	Team	Apps	(Gls)
- Hispano America
1944–45	Real Club España		

International career
- Cuba
- * Club domestic league appearances and goals

Juan José Ayra Martínez (23 June 1911 – 26 October 2008) was a Cuban international footballer. He played as goalkeeper

He represented Cuba at the 1938 FIFA World Cup in France. He appeared in one game, versus Romania, in a 2-1 victory.
