= Afonsinho (footballer, born 1914) =

Brazilian footballer

Personal information
- Full name: Afonso Guimarães da Silva
- Date of birth: 8 March 1914
- Place of birth: Rio de Janeiro, Brazil
- Date of death: 20 February 1997 (aged 82)
- Position: Midfielder

Senior career*
Years	Team	Apps	(Gls)
- América RJ
- Flamengo
- São Cristóvão
- Fluminense

International career
- Brazil
Medal record
Representing Brazil
FIFA World Cup
Third place	1938 France
- * Club domestic league appearances and goals

Afonso Guimarães da Silva, best known as Afonsinho (born in Rio de Janeiro, March 8, 1914 – February 20, 1997), was a Brazilian footballer who played as an attacking midfielder.

During his career (1931–1946), he played for America-RJ, Flamengo, São Cristóvão and Fluminense. He won four Rio de Janeiro State Championships (1931, 1940, 1941, 1946). For the Brazilian team, he played at the 1937 South American Championship, scoring one goal, and played four matches in the 1938 FIFA World Cup.

He died at the age of 82.
