= Ladislav Šimůnek =

Czech footballer

Personal information
- Full name: Ladislav Šimůnek
- Date of birth: 4 October 1916
- Date of death: 7 December 1969 (aged 53)

International career
Years	Team	Apps	(Gls)
1938	Czechoslovakia	4	(3)

Ladislav Šimůnek (4 October 1916 – 7 December 1969) was a Czech football player.

He was a devoted player of SK Slavia Praha.

He played for the Czechoslovakia national team (4 matches/3 goals) and was a participant at the 1938 FIFA World Cup, where he played two games.
