= Walter (footballer, born 1912) =

Brazilian footballer

Personal information
- Full name: Walter de Souza Goulart
- Date of birth: 17 July 1912
- Place of birth: Rio de Janeiro, Brazil
- Date of death: 13 November 1951 (aged 39)
- Position: Goalkeeper

Senior career*
Years	Team	Apps	(Gls)
1931	Andarahy		
1932–1933	E.C. Cocotá		
1934–1936	América		
1936	Santos		
1937–1938	Bangu		
1938–1941	Flamengo		
1942	Vasco da Gama		
1943	América		

International career
1938	Brazil		
Medal record
Representing Brazil
FIFA World Cup
Third place	1938 France
- * Club domestic league appearances and goals

Walter de Souza Goulart (17 July 1912 – 13 November 1951), known as just Walter, was a Brazilian footballer who played as a goalkeeper. He played for Brazil national team at the 1938 FIFA World Cup finals, where they managed a third-place finish.
