= Josef Ludl =

Czech footballer

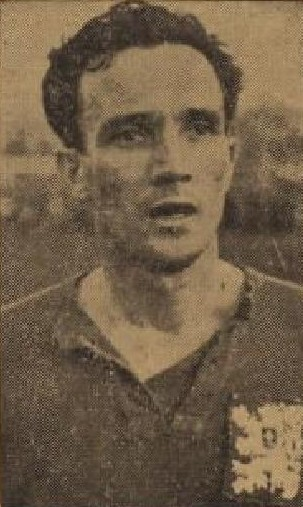

Personal information
- Date of birth: 3 June 1916
- Place of birth: Dalovice, Bohemia, Austria-Hungary
- Date of death: 1 August 1998 (aged 82)
- Place of death: Prague, Czech Republic
- Position: Striker

Senior career*
| Years | Team | Apps | (Gls) |
| 1934–1939 | Viktoria Žižkov | | |
| 1939–1951 | Sparta Prague | 213 | (99) |

International career
| 1937–1948 | Czechoslovakia | 16 | (6) |

Managerial career
- 1956: Spartak Hradec Králové
- 1957–1958: SONP Kladno
- 1960–1961: Jednota Trenčín
- * Club domestic league appearances and goals

Josef Ludl (3 June 1916 – 1 August 1998) was a Czech footballer. He played for Czechoslovakia, for which he played sixteen matches and scored six goals.

Ludl was a participant in the 1938 FIFA World Cup. He played for FK Viktoria Žižkov and AC Sparta Prague at club level.
