= Antal Szabó =

Hungarian footballer

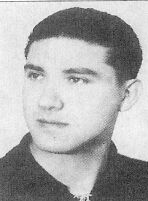
- Antal Szabó.

Personal information
- Date of birth: 4 September 1910
- Place of birth: Soroksár, Austria-Hungary
- Date of death: 18 April 1972 (aged 61)
- Place of death: Nürtingen, West Germany
- Height: 1.74 m (5 ft 9 in)
- Position: Goalkeeper

Senior career*
Years	Team	Apps	(Gls)
- MTK Hungaria

International career
	Hungary	42	(0)
Medal record
Representing Hungary
FIFA World Cup
Runner-up	1938 France
- * Club domestic league appearances and goals

Antal Szabó (4 September 1910 – 18 April 1972) was a Hungarian goalkeeper who played in the 1930s. Szabó appeared as goalkeeper for Hungary at the 1938 World Cup final. Szabó expressed his relief following his side's defeat against Italy despite letting in four goals in the loss. Referring to Mussolini's pre-match threats (Il Duce had been misquoted as telling the Italian players to "Win or die"), Szabó quipped "I may have let in four goals, but at least I saved their lives".

At club level Szabó played for MTK Hungaria. He made 40 appearances for the Hungary national football team.
