= José Tapia =

Cuban football manager

Personal information
- Full name: José Manuel Tapia Hernández
- Date of birth: February 19, 1905
- Place of birth: San José de las Lajas, Cuba

Managerial career
- Years: Team
- 1930–1938: Cuba

José Manuel Tapia Hernández (born 19 February 1905, date of death unknown) was a Cuban football coach who managed Cuba in the 1938 FIFA World Cup, where they were eliminated in the quarter finals by Sweden in what was, to date, Cuba's only appearance in a FIFA World Cup.
