= Mario Sosa =

Cuban footballer

Personal information
- Full name: Mario Sosa Casquero
- Date of birth: 1910
- Place of birth: Cuba
- Position: Forward

Senior career*
Years	Team	Apps	(Gls)
- Iberia La Habana

International career
1938	Cuba		
- * Club domestic league appearances and goals

Mario Sosa Casquero (born 1910, date of death unknown) was a Cuban footballer. Sosa is deceased.

== International career ==
He represented Cuba at the 1938 FIFA World Cup in France. Sosa appeared in two matches.
