= José Antonio Rodríguez (Cuban footballer) =

Cuban footballer

Personal information
- Full name: José Antonio Rodríguez Fernández
- Date of birth: 1915
- Place of birth: Cuba
- Date of death: 1975 (aged 59–60)
- Position: Midfielder

Senior career*
Years	Team	Apps	(Gls)
- Centro Gallego

International career
- Cuba
- * Club domestic league appearances and goals

José Antonio Rodríguez Fernández (Spain. José Antonio Rodríguez Fernández, 1915 – 1978) was a Cuban footballer.

== International career ==
He represented Cuba at the 1938 FIFA World Cup in France. Rodríguez appeared in all three matches.
