= Arthur Machado =

Brazilian footballer (1909–1997)

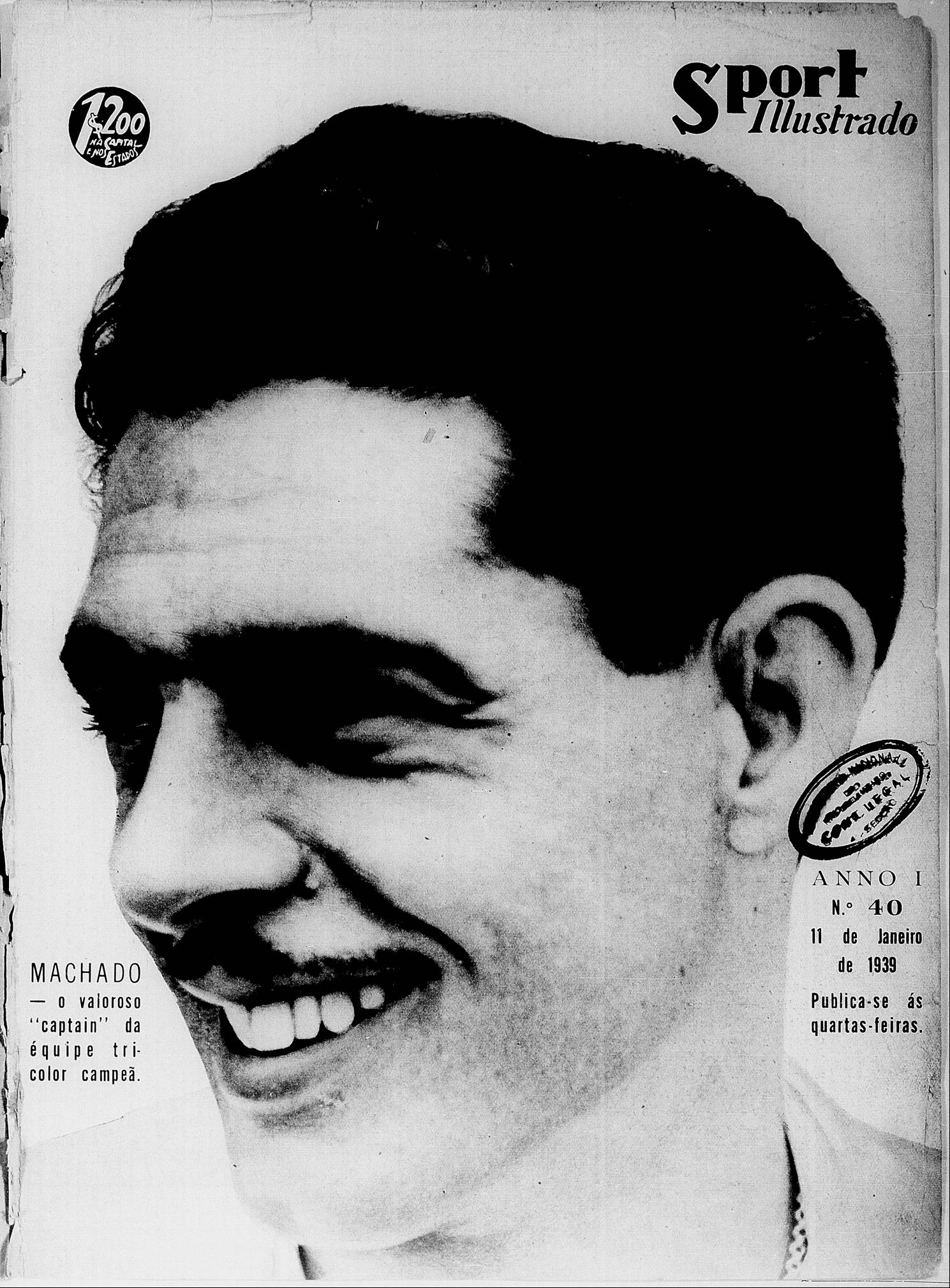

Personal information
- Full name: Arthur Machado
- Date of birth: 1 January 1909
- Place of birth: Niterói, Brazil
- Date of death: 20 February 1997 (aged 88)
- Height: 1.74 m (5 ft 8 1/2 in)
- Position: Defender

Senior career*
Years	Team	Apps	(Gls)
1927–1934	Portuguesa Desportos		
1935–1942	Fluminense		
1943–1944	Comercial-SP		
1945	Juventus		

International career
1938–1939	Brazil	6	(0)
Medal record
Representing Brazil
FIFA World Cup
Third place	1938 France
- * Club domestic league appearances and goals

Arthur Machado (1 January 1909 – 20 February 1997) was a former Brazilian football player. He has played for Brazil national team at the 1938 FIFA World Cup finals.
