= Pál Titkos =

Hungarian footballer (1908–1988)

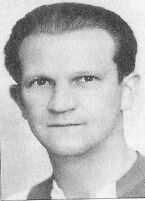
- Pál Titkos.

Personal information
- Full name: Pál Titkos
- Date of birth: 8 January 1908
- Place of birth: Kelenvölgy, Austria-Hungary
- Date of death: 9 October 1988 (aged 80)
- Place of death: Budapest, Hungary
- Position: Striker

Senior career*
Years	Team	Apps	(Gls)
1926–1929	Budai 33		
1929–1940	MTK Hungária FC		

International career
1929–1938	Hungary	48	(13)

Managerial career
- 1942–1943: Budapest Honvéd
- 1946–1947: MTK Budapest FC
- 1957–1958: Al Ahly
- 1958–1961: Egypt
- 1963: Zalaegerszegi TE
Medal record
Men's football
Representing Hungary (as player)
FIFA World Cup
Runner-up	1938 France
Representing United Arab Republic (as manager)
Africa Cup of Nations
Winner	1959 United Arab Republic
- * Club domestic league appearances and goals

Pál Titkos (8 January 1908 – 8 October 1988) was a Hungarian footballer who played as a forward for MTK Hungária FC and the Hungary national team. He scored two goals in the 1938 FIFA World Cup, including one in the final itself where Hungary were defeated 4–2 by Italy.

He coached MTK Budapest FC and Egypt.

== Honours ==
=== Player ===
Hungary

- FIFA World Cup runners-up: 1938

=== Manager ===
Al Ahly

- Egyptian Premier League: 1957–58
- Egypt Cup: 1958

United Arab Republic

- African Cup of Nations: 1959
