= Zéca Lopes =

Brazilian footballer (1910–1996)

Personal information
- Full name: José dos Santos Lopes
- Date of birth: 1 November 1910
- Place of birth: Batatais, Brazil
- Date of death: 28 August 1996 (aged 85)
- Position: Forward

Senior career*
Years	Team	Apps	(Gls)
1932–1941	Corinthians		

International career
1938	Brazil		
Medal record
Representing Brazil
FIFA World Cup
Third place	1938 France
- * Club domestic league appearances and goals

José dos Santos Lopes (1 November 1910 – 28 August 1996) known as Zéca Lopes, was a Brazilian footballer played as a forward for Brazil national team at the 1938 FIFA World Cup finals.
