= Pedro Bergés =

Cuban footballer

Personal information
- Full name: Pedro Manuel Bergés Naval
- Date of birth: 1906
- Place of birth: Cuba
- Date of death: 1978 (aged 71–72)
- Height: 1.67 m (5 ft 5 1/2 in)
- Position: Midfielder

Senior career*
Years	Team	Apps	(Gls)
- Iberia Havana

International career
- Cuba
- * Club domestic league appearances and goals

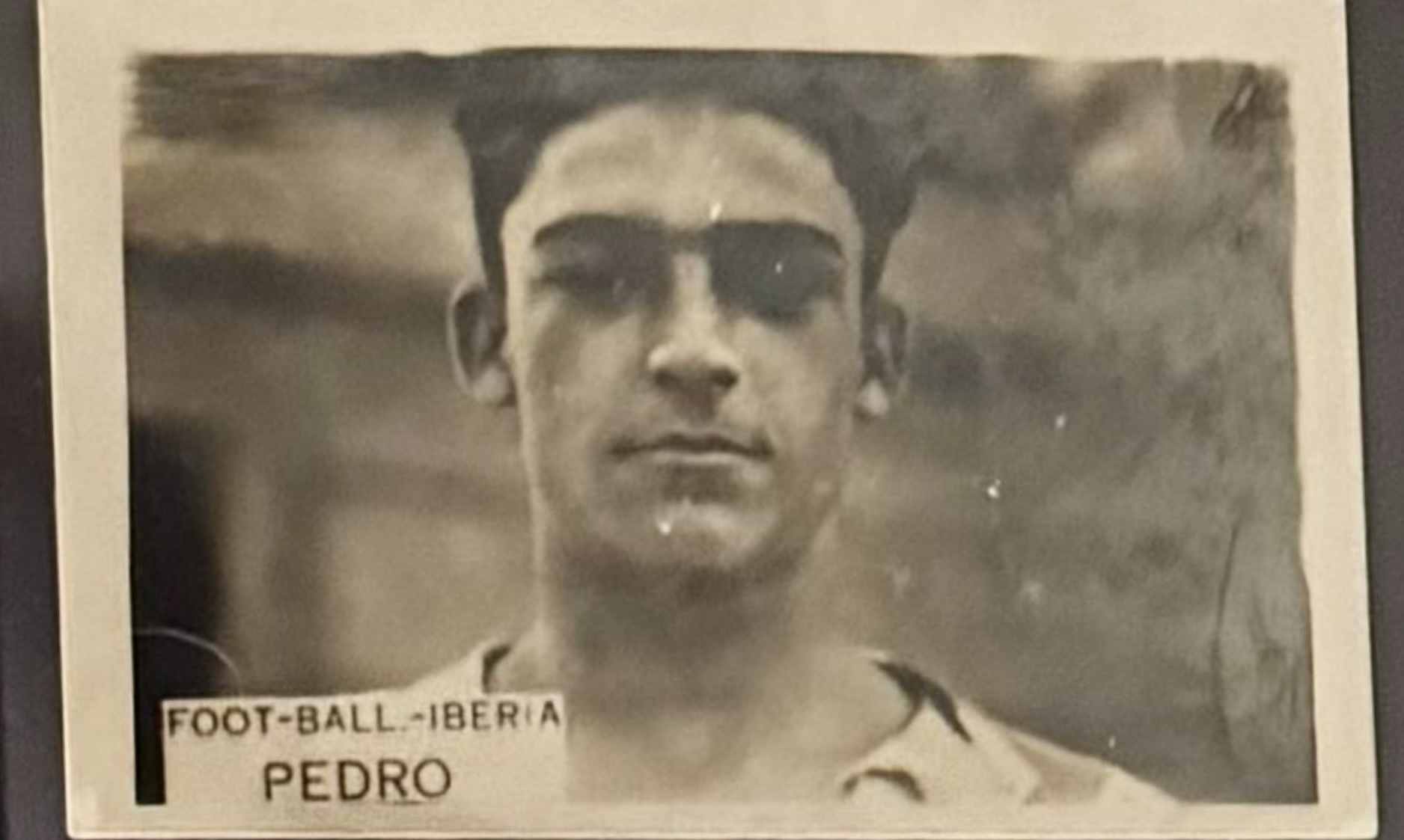
Pedro Bergés with Iberia (Havana)

Pedro Manuel Bergés Naval (1906–1978) was a Cuban footballer.

== International career ==
He represented Cuba at the 1938 FIFA World Cup in France. In his three matches, Bergés did not score a goal.
