= Károly Dietz =

Hungarian footballer (1885–1969)

Personal information
- Date of birth: 21 July 1885
- Place of birth: Sopron, Hungary
- Date of death: 9 July 1969 (aged 83)
- Place of death: Budapest, Hungary

Senior career*
Years	Team	Apps	(Gls)
- Magyar AC
- Műegyetemi AFC

Managerial career
- 1934–1939: Hungary
- * Club domestic league appearances and goals

Károly Dietz (21 July 1885 – 9 July 1969) was a Hungarian football player and manager who coached Hungary in the 1938 FIFA World Cup. He was the national football team's manager from 1934 to 1939. Dietz also played for Magyar AC and Műegyetemi AFC.
