= Jacinto Barquín =

Cuban footballer

Personal information
- Full name: Jacinto Barquín Rivero
- Date of birth: 3 September 1915
- Place of birth: Cuba
- Position: Defender

Senior career*
Years	Team	Apps	(Gls)
- Juventud Asturiana

International career
1938–1949	Cuba		
- * Club domestic league appearances and goals

Jacinto Barquín Rivero (3 September 1915 – date of death unknown) was a Cuban footballer. Barquín is deceased.

== International career ==
=== 1938 World Cup ===
He represented Cuba at the 1938 FIFA World Cup in France. In three matches, Barquín won once, drew once and lost once.

=== 1950 World Cup qualifiers ===
Barquín again represented Cuba internationally in 1949, losing twice to Mexico in qualifiers for the 1950 FIFA World Cup.
