= Ernst Lörtscher =

Swiss footballer (1913-1993)

Personal information
- Date of birth: 15 March 1913
- Place of birth: Bucharest, Romania
- Date of death: 30 November 1993
- Place of death: Switzerland
- Position: Midfielder

Youth career
- Forward Morges
- Lausanne-Sports
- BSC Young Boys

Senior career*
Years	Team	Apps	(Gls)
1932–1943	Servette		

International career
1934–1938	Switzerland	21	(1)
- * Club domestic league appearances and goals

Ernst Lörtscher (15 March 1913 – 30 November 1993) was a Swiss footballer. He played for Servette Genf and the Switzerland national football team, for whom he appeared in the 1938 FIFA World Cup, during which he became the second player in the event's history to score an own goal. This distinction occurred during Switzerland's 4–2 replay match victory against Germany on 9 June.
