= Martim Silveira =

Brazilian footballer

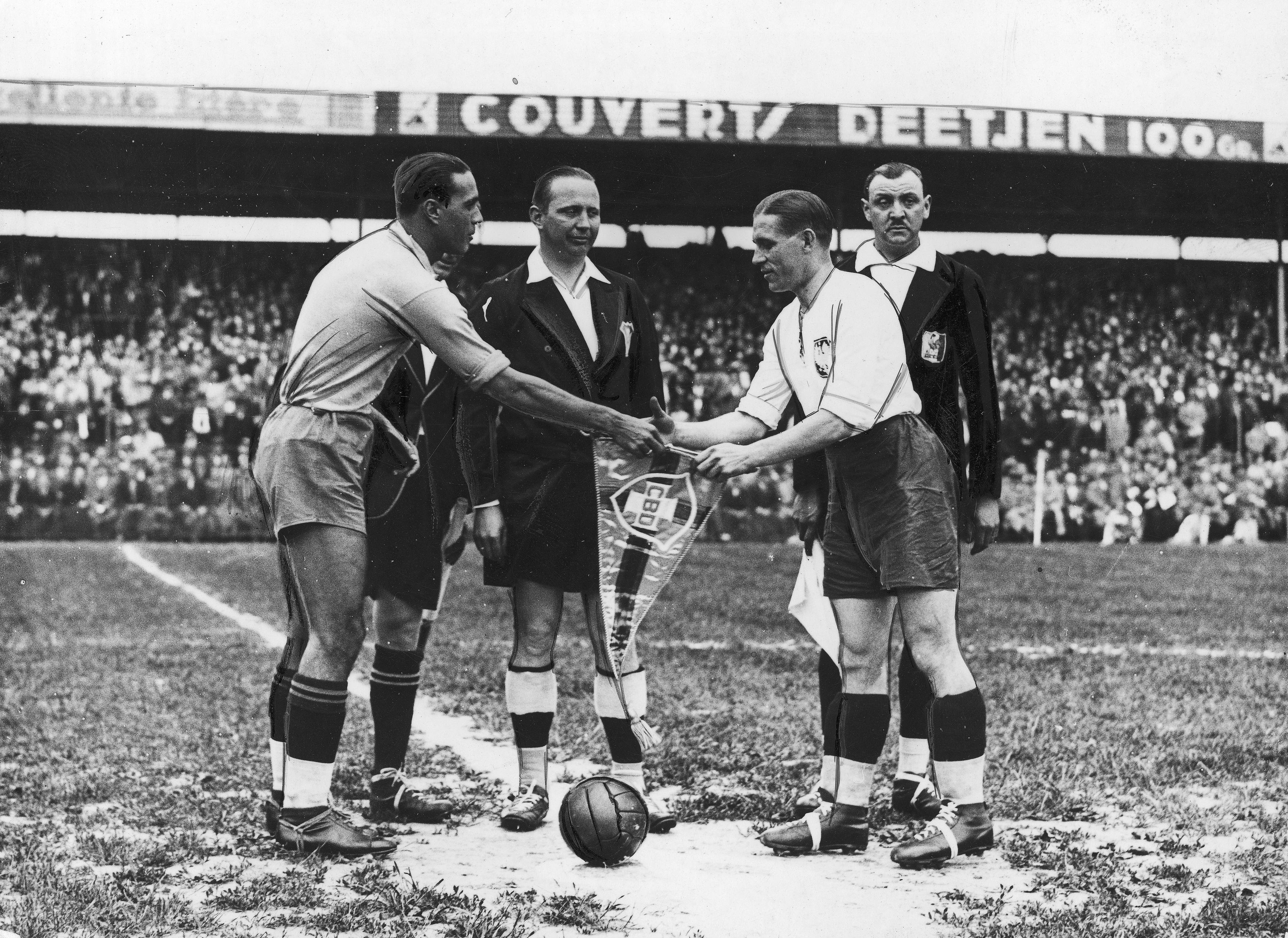
- Martim (left) exchanges pennants with Władysław Szczepaniak at the 1938 FIFA World Cup

Personal information
- Full name: Martim Mércio da Silveira
- Date of birth: 2 March 1911
- Place of birth: Bagé, Brazil
- Date of death: 26 May 1972 (aged 61)
- Position: Midfielder

Senior career*
| Years | Team | Apps | (Gls) |
| 1929 | Guarany FC (Bagé, RS) | | |
| 1929–1932 | Botafogo | | |
| 1933 | Boca Juniors | 28 | (0) |
| 1934–1940 | Botafogo | | |

International career
| 1934–1938 | Brazil | | |

Managerial career
- 1944: Botafogo
- 1946: Botafogo
- 1952–1953: Botafogo
Medal record
Representing Brazil
FIFA World Cup
| Third place | 1938 France |
- * Club domestic league appearances and goals

Martim Mércio da Silveira (2 March 1911 – 26 May 1972), in Argentina better known as Martín Mercío Silveyra, was a Brazilian football player. He played for Brazil national team at the 1934 and 1938 World Cup finals.

He commenced his career in 1929 with Guarany FC of Bagé in the state of Rio Grande do Sul. In October 1929 he moved on to Rio de Janeiro where he joined Botafogo FC where he won the Championships of Rio of the same year and 1932. From February to December 1933 he played for CA Boca Juniors in the Argentine capital Buenos Aires, where he was the first Brazilian in the club's history. After this he returned to Botafogo winning 1934 and 1935 two more city Championships, albeit in the amateur oriented league in the then divided football of Rio. He stayed with Botafogo until the end of his career in 1940.

After his death he was buried on 27 May 1972 in the Cemitério de São João Batista in Botafogo, Rio de Janeiro.
