= Héctor Socorro =

Cuban footballer

Personal information
- Full name: Héctor Socorro Varela
- Date of birth: June 26, 1912
- Place of birth: Cuba
- Date of death: 1980 (aged 67–68)
- Height: 1.75 m (5 ft 9 in)
- Position: Forward

Senior career*
Years	Team	Apps	(Gls)
- Iberia La Habana

International career
1938	Cuba	2	(3)
- * Club domestic league appearances and goals

Héctor Socorro Varela (26 June 1912 – 1980) was a Cuban footballer.

== International career ==
He represented Cuba at the 1938 World Cup in France, scoring three goals in the two matches against Romania.
