= Josef Meissner =

Czech football manager

Personal information
- Date of birth: 21 October 1893
- Place of birth: Prague, Austria-Hungary

Managerial career
- Years: Team
- 1938: Czechoslovakia

Josef Meissner (born 21 October 1893) was a Czechoslovak football manager who coached Czechoslovakia in the 1938 FIFA World Cup.
