= José Perácio =

Brazilian footballer

Perácio
Personal information
- Full name: José Perácio Berjun
- Date of birth: 2 November 1917
- Place of birth: Nova Lima, Brazil
- Date of death: 10 March 1977 (aged 59)
- Place of death: Rio de Janeiro, Brazil
- Position: Forward

Senior career*
Years	Team	Apps	(Gls)
1932–1936	Villa Nova		
1937–1941	Botafogo	58	(38)
1941	→ Canto do Rio (loan)	8	(5)
1941–1948	Flamengo	68	(60)
1951	Canto do Rio	7	(3)

International career
1938	Brazil	6	(4)
Medal record
Representing Brazil
FIFA World Cup
Third place	1938 France
- * Club domestic league appearances and goals

José Perácio Berjun, also known as Perácio (2 November 1917 in Nova Lima – 10 March 1977 in Rio de Janeiro) was a Brazilian footballer who played as a striker.

Throughout his career (1932–1951) he played for Villa Nova, Botafogo, Flamengo and Canto do Rio and won three Minas Gerais state championships (1933, 1934 and 1935) and three Rio de Janeiro State Championship (1942, 1943 and 1944). At international level, he participated at the 1938 FIFA World Cup with the Brazil, helping his team to a third place finish, playing in four games and scoring three goals.

He was a volunteer in the Brazilian Expeditionary Force (FEB) during World War II.

He died at 59 years old.

== Honours ==
Villa Nova

- Minas Gerais state championships: 1933, 1934, 1935

Flamengo

- Rio de Janeiro State Championship: 1942, 1943, 1944
