= Domingos da Guia =

Brazilian footballer (1912–2000)

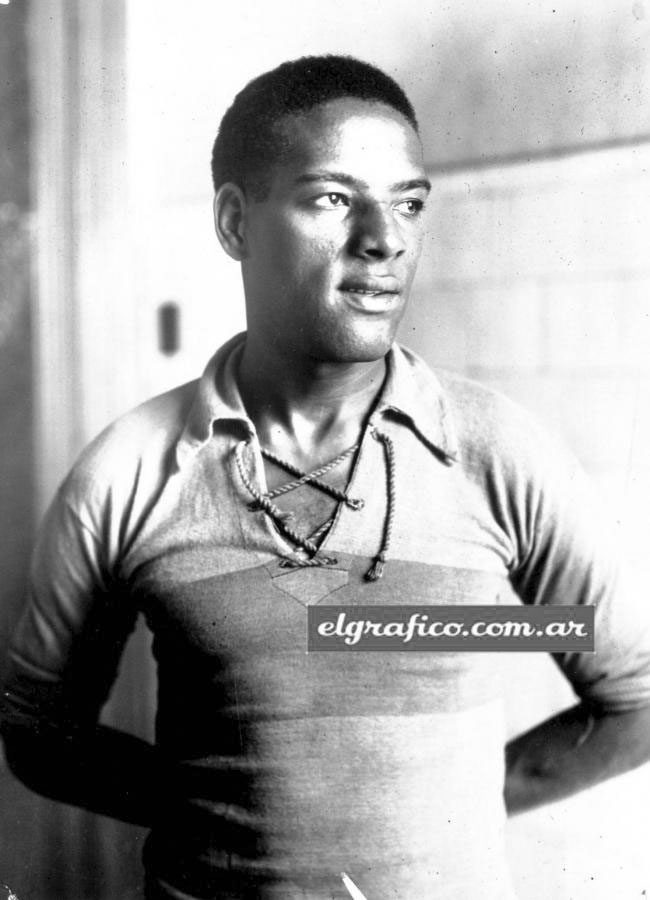
- Da Guia with Boca Juniors in 1936

Personal information
- Full name: Domingos Antônio da Guia
- Date of birth: 19 November 1912
- Place of birth: Rio de Janeiro, Brazil
- Date of death: 18 May 2000 (aged 87)
- Place of death: Rio de Janeiro, Brazil
- Height: 1.86 m (6 ft 1 in)
- Position: Centre-back

Senior career*
Years	Team	Apps	(Gls)
1929–1932	Bangu	57	(2)
1932	Vasco da Gama	14	(0)
1933	Nacional	25	(0)
1934	Vasco da Gama	12	(0)
1935–1937	Boca Juniors	56	(0)
1936	→ Flamengo (loan)	17	(0)
1937–1943	Flamengo	139	(0)
1944–1948	Corinthians	77	(0)
1948	Bangu	20	(0)
Total		417	(2)

International career
1931–1946	Brazil	30	(0)
Medal record
Representing Brazil
FIFA World Cup
Third place	1938 France
- * Club domestic league appearances and goals

Domingos Antônio da Guia (19 November 1912 – 18 May 2000) was a Brazilian footballer who played as a centre-back. He played in four matches for the Brazil national team in the 1938 FIFA World Cup finals. He is regarded as one of the best Brazilian defenders of all time.

== Honours ==
Nacional

- Uruguayan Primera División: 1933

Vasco da Gama

- Campeonato Carioca: 1934

Boca Juniors

- Argentine Primera División: 1935

Flamengo

- Campeonato Carioca: 1939, 1942, 1943

Corinthans

- Taça Cidade de São Paulo: 1947, 1948

Rio de Janeiro state team

- Campeonato Brasileiro de Seleções Estaduais: 1931, 1938, 1940

Brazil

- Copa Río Branco: 1931, 1932
- Roca Cup: 1945
- FIFA World Cup third-place: 1938
- Copa América runner-up: 1945, 1946

Individual

- FIFA World Cup All-Star Team: 1938
- South American Championship Player of the tournament: 1945
- Campeonato Paulista Team of the Tournament: 1946
