= Zezé Procópio =

Brazilian footballer (1913-1980)

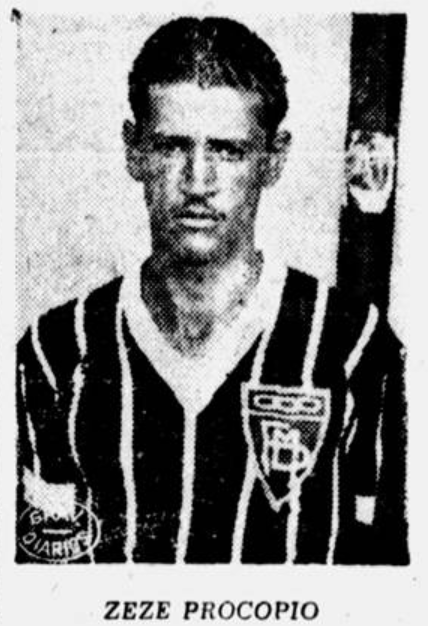

Personal information
- Full name: José Procópio Mendes
- Date of birth: 12 August 1913
- Place of birth: Valença, Brazil
- Date of death: 8 February 1980 (aged 66)
- Position: Midfielder

Senior career*
Years	Team	Apps	(Gls)
1932–1936	Villa Nova	?	(?)
1937–1938	Atlético Mineiro	30	(2)
1938–1942	Botafogo	?	(?)
1942–1943	Palmeiras	107	(1)
1943–1944	São Paulo	49	(1)
1945–1947	Palmeiras	?	(?)

International career
1938–1946	Brazil	20	(0)
Medal record
Representing Brazil
FIFA World Cup
Third place	1938 France
- * Club domestic league appearances and goals

José Procópio Mendes, best known as Zezé Procópio (12 August 1913 in Varginha, Minas Gerais State – 8 February 1980 in Valença, Rio de Janeiro State) was an association footballer who played as a midfielder.

In career (1932–1948) was played for Villa Nova, Atlético Mineiro, Botafogo, Palmeiras and São Paulo. He won a Brazilian Championship (1937), five Minas Gerais State Championship (1933, 1934, 1935, 1936, 1938) and two São Paulo State Championship (1942 and 1947). For Brazilian team he took part in 1938 FIFA World Cup, playing four matches without scoring goal.

He died at age 66.

== Honours ==
Villa Nova-MG

- Campeonato Mineiro: 1933, 1934, 1935

Atlético Mineiro

- Campeonato Mineiro: 1936 1938
- Campeonato Brasileiro: 1937

Palmeiras

- Campeonato Paulista: 1942, 1947

São Paulo

- Campeonato Paulista: 1943

Brazil

- FIFA World Cup: third-place 1938
- Copa América runner-up: 1945, 1946
