= Antal Szalay =

Hungarian footballer

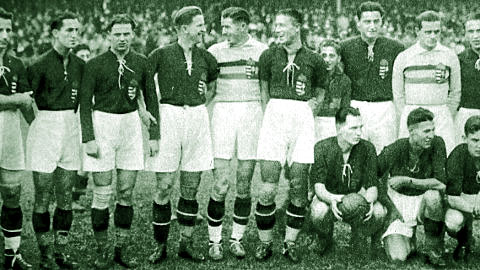

Personal information
- Full name: Antal Szalay
- Date of birth: 12 March 1912
- Place of birth: Hungary
- Date of death: 10 May 1959 (aged 47)
- Position: Midfielder

Senior career*
Years	Team	Apps	(Gls)
1930–1940	Újpest		
1940–1942	Ganz TE		
1944	Újpest		

International career
1932–1941	Hungary	29	(1)

Managerial career
- 1945: UTA Arad
- 1945-1946: FC Craiova
- 1947-1948: Carrarese
- 1949-1950: Pro Patria
Medal record
Representing Hungary
FIFA World Cup
Runner-up	1938 France
- * Club domestic league appearances and goals

Antal Szalay (12 March 1912 – 4 April 1960) was a Hungarian footballer who played for Újpest FC, as well as on the Hungary national football team at the 1934 and the 1938 FIFA World Cup. In 1938 he was part of the team that lost the World Cup final in Colombes, France, with 2–4 to Italy.

He went on to coach UTA Arad, FC Craiova, Carrarese Calcio, Pro Patria. There are reports that he may have spent 1957 in Luxembourg, where his compatriot Nándor Lengyel was coaching the national team in this period.

It is generally said, that he moved to Australia in the late 1950s, and that he may have coached St. George Budapest, a club run by Hungarian immigrants there. There is no record of Szalay having been the headcoach of the club. Also, hard information on his death is not readily available. There is a record of a man named Antal Szalay with the birthdate of 3 March 1912 who has died from a heart attack on 10 May 1959 in Olary in the outback of South Australia, circa 120 kilometres west of Broken Hill. This would imply, that Szalay found employment within the context of the local Radium Hill uranium mine. Some websites, such as National Football Teams report that he may have died on 21 April 1960.

== Honours ==
- World Cup: Finalist 1938
- Hungarian Championship: 1930–31, 1932–33, 1934–35, 1938–39
- Hungarian Cup: Finalist 1933
- Mitropa Cup: 1939
