= Tomás Fernández (footballer, born 1915) =

Cuban footballer

Personal information
- Full name: Tomás Fernández Ruiz
- Date of birth: 1915
- Place of birth: Spain
- Height: 1.81 m (5 ft 11 in)
- Position: Forward

Senior career*
Years	Team	Apps	(Gls)
- Centro Gallego

International career
- Cuba
- * Club domestic league appearances and goals

Tomás Fernández Ruiz (born in Spain, 1915 - date of death unknown) was a Cuban footballer.

== International career ==
He was born in Spain and represented Cuba at the 1938 FIFA World Cup in France, scoring a goal against Romania
