= Severino Minelli =

Swiss footballer (1909-1994)

Personal information
- Date of birth: 6 September 1909
- Place of birth: Küsnacht, Switzerland
- Date of death: 23 September 1994 (aged 85)
- Height: 1.74 m (5 ft 8 1/2 in)
- Position: Defender

Senior career*
Years	Team	Apps	(Gls)
1929–1930	Servette FC		
1930–1943	Grasshopper-Club Zurich		
1943–1946	FC Zürich	32	(3)

International career
1930–1943	Switzerland	80	(0)

Managerial career
- 1943–1946: FC Zürich
- 1949–1950: Switzerland
- * Club domestic league appearances and goals

Severino Minelli (6 September 1909 – 23 September 1994) was a Swiss footballer who played as a defender. He participated in the 1934 FIFA World Cup and the 1938 FIFA World Cup. He played a total of 80 matches for Switzerland.

He played as a sweeper in the revolutionary formation developed by the Austrian coach Karl Rappan in Grasshopper-Club Zurich as well as in Switzerland national football team, the "verrou" ("the bolt").

He coached FC Zürich and Switzerland.
