= Sirio Vernati =

Swiss footballer (1907-1993)

Personal information
- Date of birth: 12 May 1907
- Place of birth: Zurich, Switzerland
- Date of death: 22 February 1993 (aged 85)
- Position: Midfielder

Senior career*
Years	Team	Apps	(Gls)
1928–1933	FC Zürich		
1933–1940	Grasshopper Club Zürich		
1940–1943	FC Luzern		
1943–1946	Young Fellows Zürich		

International career
1936–1943	Switzerland	37	(0)
- * Club domestic league appearances and goals

Sirio Vernati (12 May 1907 – 22 February 1993) was a Swiss footballer who played for Switzerland in the 1938 FIFA World Cup. He also played for FC Zürich, Grasshopper Club Zürich, FC Luzern, and Young Fellows Zürich.
