= Hermann Springer =

Swiss footballer (1908-1978)

Personal information
- Date of birth: 4 December 1908
- Date of death: 12 December 1978 (aged 70)
- Position: Midfielder

Senior career*
Years	Team	Apps	(Gls)
1925–1934	FC Blue Stars Zürich		
1934–1946	Grasshopper Club Zürich		

International career
1929–1946	Switzerland	37	(1)
- * Club domestic league appearances and goals

Hermann Springer (4 December 1908 in Zurich– 12 December 1978) was a Swiss footballer who played for Switzerland in the 1938 FIFA World Cup. He also played for FC Blue Stars Zürich and Grasshopper Club Zürich.
