= Alfred Bickel =

Swiss footballer and manager (1918–1999)

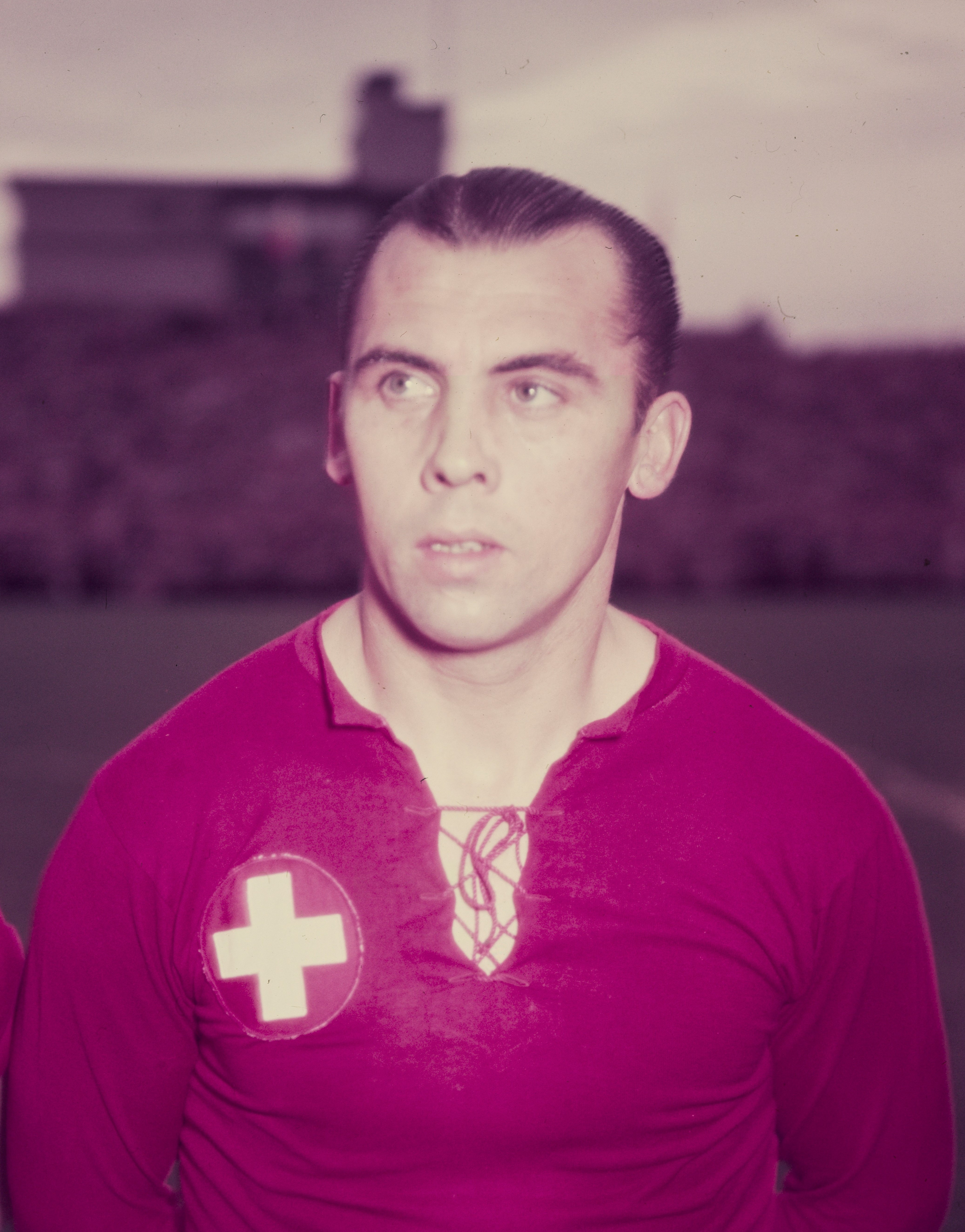
- Bickel in 1954

Personal information
- Date of birth: 12 May 1918
- Place of birth: Eppstein, German Empire
- Date of death: 18 August 1999 (aged 81)
- Position: Striker

Senior career*
Years	Team	Apps	(Gls)
1935–1956	Grasshopper Club Zürich	405	(202)

International career
1936–1954	Switzerland	71	(15)

Managerial career
- 1958–1960: Grasshopper Club Zürich
- 1963–1964: Grasshopper Club Zürich
- * Club domestic league appearances and goals

Alfred Bickel, also referred to as Fredy Bickel (12 May 1918 – 18 August 1999) was a Swiss football player and coach. He played as a forward for local club Grasshopper Club Zürich and the Switzerland national team, participating with the latter in the World Cup finals of 1938 and 1950.

He played 405 matches and scored 202 goals in the Swiss first division from 1935 to 1956, a period during which he won 7 league titles and 9 cup titles with Grasshopper.

He was a member of the Swiss national team from 1936 to 1954, earning 71 caps and scoring 15 goals, including one in their first-round victory over Nazi Germany in the 1938 World Cup. He was the first player in World Cup history to score against the country of his birth; the only other players to have done so were Breel Embolo, also for Switzerland, against Cameroon in 2022. and Wahbi Khazri for Tunisia, against France at the same tournament,

Bickel is one of only two footballers ever to participate in World Cups before and after World War II, the other being Sweden's Erik Nilsson.

Awards
Preceded by (Switzerland) Josef Stalder	Swiss Sportsman of the Year; 1953	Succeeded by (Switzerland) Ida Bieri-Schöpfer
