= Manuel Chorens =

Cuban footballer

Personal information
- Full name: Manuel Chorens García
- Date of birth: January 22, 1916
- Place of birth: Cuba
- Position: Defender

Senior career*
Years	Team	Apps	(Gls)
- Centro Gallego

International career
- Cuba
- * Club domestic league appearances and goals

Manuel Chorens García (born 22 January 1916, date of death unknown) was a Cuban footballer.

== International career ==
He represented Cuba at the 1938 FIFA World Cup in France, serving as captain.
