= Joaquín Arias (footballer) =

Cuban footballer (1914–??)

Personal information
- Full name: Joaquín Arias Blanco
- Date of birth: 12 November 1914
- Place of birth: Cuba
- Position: Midfielder

Senior career*
Years	Team	Apps	(Gls)
- Juventud Asturiana

International career
- Cuba
- * Club domestic league appearances and goals

Joaquín Arias Blanco (born 12 November 1914, date of death unknown) was a Cuban footballer.

Nicknamed Bolero, Arias represented Cuba at the 1938 FIFA World Cup in France. He played three matches.

Arias is deceased.
