= 1938 FIFA World Cup squads =

Below are the squads for the 1938 FIFA World Cup final tournament in France.

Hungary and Switzerland were the only teams who had players from foreign clubs. Both of such players represented French clubs.

Nine selected players by Germany came from the qualified but not participating Austria due to Anschluss.

Rosters include reserves, alternates, and preselected players that may have participated in qualifiers and/or pre-tournament friendlies but not in the finals themselves.

== Italy ==
Head coach: Vittorio Pozzo

No.	Pos.	Player	Date of birth (age)	Caps	Club
	MF	Michele Andreolo	6 September 1912 (aged 25)	11	(Italy) Bologna
	FW	Sergio Bertoni	23 September 1915 (aged 22)	3	(Italy) Pisa
	FW	Amedeo Biavati	4 April 1915 (aged 23)	0	(Italy) Bologna
	GK	Carlo Ceresoli	14 May 1910 (aged 28)	7	(Italy) Bologna
	MF	Bruno Chizzo	19 April 1916 (aged 22)	0	(Italy) Triestina
	FW	Gino Colaussi	4 March 1914 (aged 24)	12	(Italy) Triestina
	MF	Aldo Donati	29 September 1910 (aged 27)	0	(Italy) Roma
	FW	Giovanni Ferrari	6 December 1907 (aged 30)	38	(Italy) Ambrosiana-Inter
	FW	Pietro Ferraris	15 February 1912 (aged 26)	3	(Italy) Ambrosiana-Inter
	DF	Alfredo Foni	20 January 1911 (aged 27)	6	(Italy) Juventus
	MF	Mario Genta	1 March 1912 (aged 26)	0	(Italy) Genoa
	MF	Ugo Locatelli	5 February 1916 (aged 22)	7	(Italy) Ambrosiana-Inter
	GK	Guido Masetti	22 November 1907 (aged 30)	1	(Italy) Roma
	MF	Giuseppe Meazza (c)	23 August 1910 (aged 27)	43	(Italy) Ambrosiana-Inter
	DF	Eraldo Monzeglio	5 June 1906 (aged 31)	32	(Italy) Roma
	GK	Aldo Olivieri	2 October 1910 (aged 27)	8	(Italy) Lucchese
	MF	Renato Olmi	12 July 1914 (aged 23)	0	(Italy) Ambrosiana-Inter
	FW	Piero Pasinati	21 July 1910 (aged 27)	10	(Italy) Triestina
	MF	Mario Perazzolo	7 June 1911 (aged 26)	2	(Italy) Genoa
	FW	Silvio Piola	29 September 1913 (aged 24)	14	(Italy) Lazio
	DF	Pietro Rava	21 January 1916 (aged 22)	11	(Italy) Juventus
	MF	Pietro Serantoni	11 December 1906 (aged 31)	9	(Italy) Roma

== Hungary ==
Head coach: Károly Dietz

No.	Pos.	Player	Date of birth (age)	Caps	Club
	MF	István Balogh	21 September 1912 (aged 25)	3	(Hungary) Újpest FC
	FW	Mihály Bíró	20 July 1914 (aged 23)	0	(Hungary) Ferencváros FC
	DF	Sándor Bíró	19 August 1911 (aged 26)	26	(Hungary) MTK Hungária FC
	FW	László Cseh	4 April 1910 (aged 28)	32	(Hungary) MTK Hungária FC
	MF	János Dudás	13 February 1911 (aged 27)	12	(Hungary) MTK Hungária FC
	GK	József Háda	2 March 1911 (aged 27)	15	(Hungary) Ferencváros FC
	FW	Vilmos Kohut	17 July 1906 (aged 31)	24	(France) Marseille
	DF	Lajos Korányi	15 May 1907 (aged 31)	30	(Hungary) Ferencváros FC
	MF	Gyula Lázár	24 January 1911 (aged 27)	34	(Hungary) Ferencváros FC
	GK	József Pálinkás	10 March 1912 (aged 26)	5	(Hungary) Szeged FC
	DF	Gyula Polgár	8 February 1912 (aged 26)	14	(Hungary) Ferencváros FC
	MF	Béla Sárosi	15 May 1919 (aged 19)	0	(Hungary) Ferencváros FC
	FW	György Sárosi (c)	15 September 1912 (aged 25)	42	(Hungary) Ferencváros FC
	FW	Ferenc Sas	15 March 1915 (aged 23)	13	(Hungary) MTK Hungária FC
	GK	Antal Szabó	4 September 1910 (aged 27)	32	(Hungary) MTK Hungária FC
	MF	Antal Szalay	12 March 1912 (aged 26)	19	(Hungary) Újpest FC
	MF	György Szűcs	23 April 1912 (aged 26)	23	(Hungary) Újpest FC
	FW	Pál Titkos	8 January 1908 (aged 30)	45	(Hungary) MTK Hungária FC
	FW	Géza Toldi	11 February 1909 (aged 29)	39	(Hungary) Ferencváros FC
	MF	József Turay	1 March 1905 (aged 33)	41	(Hungary) MTK Hungária FC
	FW	Jenő Vincze	20 November 1908 (aged 29)	22	(Hungary) Újpest FC
	FW	Gyula Zsengellér	27 December 1915 (aged 22)	9	(Hungary) Újpest FC

== Brazil ==
Head coach: Adhemar Pimenta

No.	Pos.	Player	Date of birth (age)	Caps	Club
	MF	Afonsinho	8 March 1914 (aged 24)	6	(Brazil) São Cristóvão
	MF	Argemiro	3 June 1915 (aged 23)	0	(Brazil) Portuguesa Santista
	GK	Batatais	20 May 1910 (aged 28)	0	(Brazil) Fluminense
	MF	Brandão	21 April 1911 (aged 27)	6	(Brazil) Corinthians
	MF	Britto	6 May 1914 (aged 24)	3	(Brazil) America-RJ
	DF	Domingos da Guia	19 November 1912 (aged 25)	2	(Brazil) Flamengo
	FW	Hércules	2 July 1912 (aged 25)	2	(Brazil) Fluminense
	DF	Jaú	7 December 1909 (aged 28)	6	(Brazil) Corinthians
	FW	Leônidas	6 September 1913 (aged 24)	3	(Brazil) Flamengo
	FW	Lopes	1 November 1910 (aged 27)	0	(Brazil) Corinthians
	FW	Luisinho	29 March 1911 (aged 27)	7	(Brazil) Palestra Italia
	DF	Machado	1 January 1909 (aged 29)	6	(Brazil) Fluminense
	MF	Martim	21 April 1911 (aged 27)	3	(Brazil) Botafogo
	DF	Nariz	8 December 1912 (aged 25)	3	(Brazil) Botafogo
	FW	Niginho	12 February 1912 (aged 26)	5	(Brazil) Vasco da Gama
	FW	Patesko	12 November 1910 (aged 27)	8	(Brazil) Botafogo
	FW	Perácio	2 November 1917 (aged 20)	0	(Brazil) Botafogo
	FW	Roberto	20 June 1912 (aged 25)	6	(Brazil) São Cristóvão
	FW	Romeu	26 March 1911 (aged 27)	0	(Brazil) Fluminense
	FW	Tim	20 February 1915 (aged 23)	6	(Brazil) Fluminense
	GK	Walter	17 July 1912 (aged 25)	0	(Brazil) Flamengo
	MF	Zezé Procópio	12 August 1913 (aged 24)	0	(Brazil) Botafogo

1. Note: Niginho was not allowed to play the semi-final against Italy as he defected the Italian army.

== Sweden ==
Head coach: (Hungary) József Nagy

No.	Pos.	Player	Date of birth (age)	Caps	Club
	GK	Henock Abrahamsson	29 October 1909 (aged 28)	0	(Sweden) Gårda BK
	MF	Erik Almgren	28 January 1908 (aged 30)	5	(Sweden) AIK
	FW	Åke Andersson	22 April 1917 (aged 21)	2	(Sweden) GAIS
	FW	Harry Andersson	7 March 1913 (aged 25)	0	(Sweden) IK Sleipner
	FW	Curt Bergsten	21 August 1915 (aged 22)	6	(Sweden) Landskrona BoIS
	FW	Lennart Bunke	3 April 1912 (aged 26)	11	(Sweden) Helsingborgs IF
	DF	Ivar Eriksson	25 December 1909 (aged 28)	1	(Sweden) Sandvikens IF
	MF	Karl-Erik Grahn	5 November 1914 (aged 23)	15	(Sweden) IF Elfsborg
	FW	Knut Hansson	9 May 1911 (aged 27)	4	(Sweden) Landskrona BoIS
	MF	Sven Jacobsson	17 April 1914 (aged 24)	2	(Sweden) GAIS
	FW	Sven Jonasson	9 July 1909 (aged 28)	28	(Sweden) IF Elfsborg
	DF	Olle Källgren	7 September 1907 (aged 30)	6	(Sweden) Sandvikens IF
	FW	Tore Keller	4 January 1905 (aged 33)	22	(Sweden) IK Sleipner
	MF	Arne Linderholm	22 February 1916 (aged 22)	0	(Sweden) IK Sleipner
	DF	Erik Nilsson	6 August 1916 (aged 21)	0	(Sweden) Malmö FF
	DF	Harry Nilsson	5 January 1916 (aged 22)	0	(Sweden) Landskrona BoIS
	FW	Arne Nyberg	20 June 1913 (aged 24)	2	(Sweden) IFK Göteborg
	FW	Erik Persson	19 November 1909 (aged 28)	27	(Sweden) AIK
	GK	Gustav Sjöberg	23 March 1913 (aged 25)	7	(Sweden) AIK
	MF	Kurt Svanström	24 March 1915 (aged 23)	4	(Sweden) Örgryte IS
	FW	Sven Unger		0	(Sweden) IK Sleipner
	FW	Gustav Wetterström	15 October 1911 (aged 26)	4	(Sweden) IK Sleipner

1. Note: This player, although registered in the official list, remained on standby in Sweden.

== Czechoslovakia ==
Head coach: Josef Meissner

No.	Pos.	Player	Date of birth (age)	Caps	Club
	MF	Jaroslav Bouček	13 November 1912 (aged 25)	22	(Czechoslovakia) AC Sparta Prague
	FW	Vojtěch Bradáč	6 October 1913 (aged 24)	7	(Czechoslovakia) SK Slavia Prague
	DF	Jaroslav Burgr	7 March 1906 (aged 32)	51	(Czechoslovakia) AC Sparta Prague
	GK	Karel Burkert	1 December 1909 (aged 28)	1	(Czechoslovakia) SK Židenice
	DF	Karel Černý	1 February 1910 (aged 28)		(Czechoslovakia) SK Slavia Prague
	DF	Ferdinand Daučík	30 May 1910 (aged 28)	10	(Czechoslovakia) SK Slavia Prague
	FW	Václav Horák	27 September 1912 (aged 25)	9	(Czechoslovakia) SK Slavia Prague
	MF	Karel Kolský	21 September 1914 (aged 23)	10	(Czechoslovakia) AC Sparta Prague
	MF	Vlastimil Kopecký	14 October 1912 (aged 25)	13	(Czechoslovakia) SK Slavia Prague
	MF	Josef Košťálek	31 August 1909 (aged 28)	36	(Czechoslovakia) AC Sparta Prague
	FW	Arnošt Kreuz	9 May 1912 (aged 26)	2	(Czechoslovakia) SK Pardubice
	FW	Josef Ludl	3 June 1916 (aged 22)	3	(Czechoslovakia) Viktoria Žižkov
	FW	Oldřich Nejedlý	26 December 1909 (aged 28)	38	(Czechoslovakia) AC Sparta Prague
	MF	Otakar Nožíř	12 March 1917 (aged 21)	0	(Czechoslovakia) SK Slavia Prague
	DF	Josef Orth	20 May 1916 (aged 22)		(Czechoslovakia) ŠK Slovan Bratislava
	GK	František Plánička	2 June 1904 (aged 34)	71	(Czechoslovakia) SK Slavia Prague
	FW	Antonín Puč	16 May 1907 (aged 31)	59	(Czechoslovakia) SK Slavia Prague
	FW	Jan Říha	11 November 1915 (aged 22)	9	(Czechoslovakia) AC Sparta Prague
	FW	Oldřich Rulc	28 March 1911 (aged 27)	15	(Czechoslovakia) SK Židenice
	FW	Karel Senecký	17 March 1919 (aged 19)	2	(Czechoslovakia) AC Sparta Prague
	FW	Ladislav Šimůnek	4 October 1916 (aged 21)	2	(Czechoslovakia) SK Slavia Prague
	FW	Josef Zeman	23 January 1915 (aged 23)	3	(Czechoslovakia) AC Sparta Prague

== Switzerland ==
Head coach: (Germany) Karl Rappan

No.	Pos.	Player	Date of birth (age)	Caps	Club
	FW	André Abegglen	7 March 1909 (aged 29)	40	(Switzerland) Servette
	FW	Georges Aeby	10 September 1910 (aged 27)	20	(Switzerland) Servette
	FW	Paul Aeby	10 September 1910 (aged 27)	13	(Switzerland) Young Boys Bern
	FW	Lauro Amadò	14 March 1912 (aged 26)	14	(Switzerland) Lugano
	GK	Erwin Ballabio	20 October 1918 (aged 19)	0	(Switzerland) FC Grenchen
	FW	Alfred Bickel	2 May 1918 (aged 20)	20	(Switzerland) Grasshopper Club Zürich
	GK	Renato Bizzozero	7 September 1912 (aged 25)	19	(Switzerland) Lugano
	FW	Alessandro Frigerio	15 November 1914 (aged 23)	10	(France) Le Havre AC
	FW	Tullio Grassi	5 February 1910 (aged 28)	6	(Switzerland) Lugano
	MF	Albert Guinchard	10 November 1914 (aged 23)	10	(Switzerland) Servette
	GK	Willy Huber	17 December 1913 (aged 24)	11	(Switzerland) Grasshopper Club Zürich
	FW	Leopold Kielholz	9 June 1911 (aged 26)	17	(Switzerland) SC YF Juventus
	DF	August Lehmann	26 January 1909 (aged 29)	17	(Switzerland) Grasshopper Club Zürich
	MF	Ernst Lörtscher	15 March 1913 (aged 25)	18	(Switzerland) Servette
	DF	Severino Minelli	6 September 1909 (aged 28)	64	(Switzerland) Grasshopper Club Zürich
	MF	Oscar Rauch	20 March 1914 (aged 24)	3	(Switzerland) Grasshopper Club Zürich
	FW	Eugen Rupf	16 June 1914 (aged 23)	6	(Switzerland) Grasshopper Club Zürich
	MF	Hermann Springer	4 December 1908 (aged 29)	19	(Switzerland) Grasshopper Club Zürich
	DF	Adolf Stelzer	1 September 1908 (aged 29)	14	(Switzerland) Lausanne Sports
	MF	Sirio Vernati	12 May 1907 (aged 31)	20	(Switzerland) Grasshopper Club Zürich
	FW	Fritz Wagner	21 December 1913 (aged 24)	8	(Switzerland) Grasshopper Club Zürich
	FW	Eugen Walaschek	20 June 1916 (aged 21)	12	(Switzerland) Servette

1. Note: Rappan was Austrian, but Austria was annexed into Nazi Germany at the time.

== Cuba ==
Head coach: José Tapia

No.	Pos.	Player	Date of birth (age)	Caps	Club
	FW	Juan Alonzo	24 June 1911 (aged 26)	0	(Cuba) Centro Gallego
	MF	Joaquín Arias	12 November 1914 (aged 23)	0	(Cuba) Juventud Asturiana
	GK	Juan Ayra	23 June 1911 (aged 26)	5	(Cuba) Hispano America
	DF	Jacinto Barquín	3 September 1915 (aged 22)	5	(Cuba) Juventud Asturiana
	MF	Pedro Bergés	1906	0	(Cuba) Iberia Havana
	GK	Benito Carvajales	25 July 1913 (aged 24)	0	(Cuba) Centro Gallego
	DF	Manuel Chorens	22 January 1916 (aged 22)	0	(Cuba) Centro Gallego
	FW	Tomás Fernández	1915	0	(Cuba) Centro Gallego
	FW	Pedro Ferrer	1908	1	(Cuba) Iberia Havana
	FW	José Magriñá	14 December 1917 (aged 20)	3	(Cuba) Centro Gallego
	FW	Carlos Oliveira		0	(Cuba) Hispano America
	MF	José Antonio Rodríguez		0	(Cuba) Centro Gallego
	FW	Héctor Socorro	26 June 1912 (aged 25)	6	(Cuba) Iberia Havana
	FW	Mario Sosa	1910	5	(Cuba) Iberia Havana
	FW	Juan Tuñas	17 July 1917 (aged 20)	0	(Cuba) Centro Gallego

1. Note: Tapia was also registered as a player due to the few players who traveled to France.

== France ==
Head coach: Gaston Barreau

No.	Pos.	Player	Date of birth (age)	Caps	Club
	FW	Alfred Aston	16 May 1912 (aged 26)	15	(France) Red Star Olympique
	MF	Jean Bastien	21 June 1915 (aged 22)	0	(France) Marseille
	DF	Abdelkader Ben Bouali	25 October 1912 (aged 25)	1	(France) Marseille
	MF	François Bourbotte	24 February 1913 (aged 25)	9	(France) SC Fives
	FW	Michel Brusseaux	19 March 1913 (aged 25)	1	(France) FC Sète
	DF	Hector Cazenave	13 April 1914 (aged 24)	6	(France) FC Sochaux-Montbéliard
	FW	Roger Courtois	30 May 1912 (aged 26)	19	(France) FC Sochaux-Montbéliard
	GK	Julien Darui	16 February 1916 (aged 22)	0	(France) Olympique Lillois
	FW	Edmond Delfour	1 November 1907 (aged 30)	39	(France) RC Roubaix
	GK	Laurent Di Lorto	1 January 1909 (aged 29)	9	(France) FC Sochaux-Montbéliard
	MF	Raoul Diagne	10 November 1910 (aged 27)	11	(France) RC Paris
	FW	Oscar Heisserer	18 July 1914 (aged 23)	6	(France) RC Strasbourg
	MF	Lucien Jasseron	29 December 1913 (aged 24)	0	(France) Le Havre AC
	MF	Auguste Jordan	21 February 1909 (aged 29)	3	(France) RC Paris
	FW	Ignace Kowalczyk	27 December 1913 (aged 24)	5	(France) Metz
	GK	René Llense	14 July 1913 (aged 24)	9	(France) FC Sète
	DF	Étienne Mattler	25 December 1905 (aged 32)	38	(France) FC Sochaux-Montbéliard
	FW	Jean Nicolas	9 June 1913 (aged 24)	22	(France) FC Rouen
	DF	Martin Povolny	19 July 1914 (aged 23)	0	(France) Le Havre AC
	DF	Jules Vandooren	30 December 1908 (aged 29)	14	(France) Olympique Lillois
	FW	Émile Veinante	12 June 1907 (aged 30)	18	(France) RC Paris
	FW	Mario Zatelli	21 December 1912 (aged 25)	0	(France) Marseille

== Romania ==
Head coach: Alexandru Săvulescu and Costel Rădulescu

No.	Pos.	Player	Date of birth (age)	Caps	Club
	FW	Iuliu Baratky	14 May 1910 (aged 28)	10	(Romania) Rapid București
	MF	Andrei Bărbulescu	25 March 1917 (aged 21)	2	(Romania) Venus București
	FW	Silviu Bindea	24 October 1912 (aged 25)	18	(Romania) Ripensia Timişoara
	FW	Iuliu Bodola	26 February 1912 (aged 26)	39	(Romania) Venus București
	FW	Ion Bogdan	6 March 1915 (aged 23)	1	(Romania) Rapid București
	MF	Gheorghe Brandabura	23 February 1913 (aged 25)	4	(Romania) Juventus București
	DF	Rudolf Bürger	31 October 1908 (aged 29)	27	(Romania) Ripensia Timişoara
	DF	Vasile Chiroiu	13 August 1910 (aged 27)	5	(Romania) Ripensia Timişoara
	MF	Vintilă Cossini	21 November 1913 (aged 24)	12	(Romania) Rapid București
	GK	Mircea David	16 October 1914 (aged 23)	4	(Romania) Venus București
	FW	Ștefan Dobay	26 September 1909 (aged 28)	33	(Romania) Ripensia Timişoara
	FW	Coloman Braun-Bogdan	13 October 1905 (aged 32)	-	(Romania) Juventus București
	DF	Iacob Felecan	1 March 1914 (aged 24)	4	(Romania) Victoria Cluj
	FW	Nicolae Kovács	29 October 1911 (aged 26)	35	(Romania) CAO Oradea
	FW	Ioachim Moldoveanu	17 August 1913 (aged 24)	3	(Romania) Rapid București
	FW	Miklós Nagy	11 January 1918 (aged 20)	0	(Romania) Crişana Oradea
	GK	Dumitru Pavlovici	26 April 1912 (aged 26)	8	(Romania) Ripensia Timişoara
	FW	Gyula Prassler	16 January 1916 (aged 22)	1	(Romania) AMEF Arad
	MF	Gheorghe Rășinaru	10 February 1915 (aged 23)	1	(Romania) Rapid București
	MF	László Raffinsky	23 April 1905 (aged 33)	18	(Romania) Rapid București
	GK	Robert Sadowski	16 August 1914 (aged 23)	1	(Romania) AMEF Arad
	DF	Lazăr Sfera	29 April 1909 (aged 29)	5	(Romania) Venus București

== Germany ==
Head coach: Sepp Herberger

No.	Pos.	Player	Date of birth (age)	Caps	Club
	GK	Fritz Buchloh	26 November 1909 (aged 28)	17	(Germany) Hertha Berlin
	FW	Josef Gauchel	11 September 1916 (aged 21)	6	(Germany) TuS Koblenz-Neuendorf
	FW	Rudolf Gellesch	1 May 1914 (aged 24)	14	(Germany) FC Schalke 04
	DF	Ludwig Goldbrunner	5 March 1908 (aged 30)	31	(Germany) FC Bayern Munchen
	FW	Wilhelm Hahnemann	14 April 1914 (aged 24)	0	(Germany) Admira Wien
	GK	Hans Jakob	16 June 1908 (aged 29)	35	(Germany) Jahn Regensburg
	DF	Paul Janes	10 March 1912 (aged 26)	34	(Germany) Fortuna Düsseldorf
	MF	Albin Kitzinger	1 February 1912 (aged 26)	18	(Germany) 1. FC Schweinfurt 05
	MF	Andreas Kupfer	7 May 1914 (aged 24)	10	(Germany) 1. FC Schweinfurt 05
	FW	Ernst Lehner	7 November 1912 (aged 25)	39	(Germany) Schwaben Augsburg
	MF	Hans Mock	9 December 1906 (aged 31)	0	(Germany) SC Ostmark Wien
	DF	Reinhold Münzenberg	25 January 1909 (aged 29)	39	(Germany) Alemannia Aachen
	FW	Leopold Neumer	8 February 1919 (aged 19)	0	(Germany) SC Ostmark Wien
	FW	Hans Pesser	7 November 1911 (aged 26)	1	(Germany) Rapid Wien
	GK	Rudolf Raftl	7 February 1911 (aged 27)	0	(Germany) Rapid Wien
	DF	Willibald Schmaus	16 June 1911 (aged 26)	0	(Germany) First Vienna
	FW	Otto Siffling	3 August 1912 (aged 25)	31	(Germany) Waldhof Mannheim
	MF	Stefan Skoumal	29 November 1909 (aged 28)	0	(Germany) Rapid Wien
	DF	Jakob Streitle	11 December 1916 (aged 21)	0	(Germany) FC Bayern Munchen
	FW	Josef Stroh	5 March 1913 (aged 25)	0	(Germany) SC Ostmark Wien
	FW	Fritz Szepan	2 September 1907 (aged 30)	30	(Germany) FC Schalke 04
	MF	Franz Wagner	23 September 1911 (aged 26)	0	(Germany) Rapid Wien

1. Note 1: This player was previously capped for Austria prior to its annexation by Nazi Germany.
2. Note 2: Austria was part of Nazi Germany at the time.

== Poland ==
Head coach: Józef Kałuża

No.	Pos.	Player	Date of birth (age)	Caps	Club
	FW	Stanisław Baran	26 April 1920 (aged 18)	0	(Poland) Warszawianka Warszawa
	GK	Walter Brom	14 February 1921 (aged 17)	0	(Poland) Ruch Chorzów
	FW	Ewald Cebula	22 March 1917 (aged 21)	0	(Poland) Śląsk Świętochłowice
	MF	Ewald Dytko	18 October 1914 (aged 23)	16	(Poland) Dąb Katowice
	DF	Antoni Gałecki	4 June 1906 (aged 32)	16	(Poland) ŁKS Łódź
	DF	Edmund Giemsa	16 October 1912 (aged 25)	6	(Poland) Ruch Chorzów
	MF	Wilhelm Góra	18 January 1916 (aged 22)	8	(Poland) Cracovia
	FW	Bolesław Habowski	13 September 1914 (aged 23)	1	(Poland) Wisła Kraków
	FW	Józef Korbas	11 November 1914 (aged 23)	1	(Poland) Cracovia
	MF	Kazimierz Lis	9 April 1910 (aged 28)	0	(Poland) Warta Poznań
	FW	Antoni Łyko	27 May 1907 (aged 31)	1	(Poland) Wisła Kraków
	GK	Edward Madejski	11 August 1914 (aged 23)	6	Unattached
	MF	Erwin Nyc	24 May 1914 (aged 24)	4	(Poland) Polonia Warszawa
	FW	Leonard Piątek	3 October 1913 (aged 24)	9	(Poland) AKS Chorzów
	FW	Ryszard Piec	17 August 1913 (aged 24)	18	(Poland) Naprzód Lipiny
	MF	Wilhelm Piec	7 January 1915 (aged 23)	3	(Poland) Naprzód Lipiny
	FW	Fryderyk Scherfke	7 September 1909 (aged 28)	12	(Poland) Warta Poznań
	DF	Władysław Szczepaniak	19 May 1910 (aged 28)	22	(Poland) Polonia Warszawa
	DF	Edmund Twórz	12 February 1914 (aged 24)	2	(Poland) Warta Poznań
	MF	Jan Wasiewicz	6 January 1911 (aged 27)	14	(Poland) Pogoń Lwów
	FW	Ernst Wilimowski	23 June 1916 (aged 21)	14	(Poland) Ruch Chorzów
	FW	Gerard Wodarz	10 August 1913 (aged 24)	24	(Poland) Ruch Chorzów

1. Note: This player, although registered in the official list, remained on standby in Poland.

== Norway ==
Head coach: Asbjørn Halvorsen

No.	Pos.	Player	Date of birth (age)	Caps	Club
	FW	Arne Brustad	14 April 1912 (aged 26)	19	(Norway) Lyn
	FW	Knut Brynildsen	23 July 1917 (aged 20)	1	(Norway) Fredrikstad
	DF	Nils Eriksen	5 March 1911 (aged 27)	34	(Norway) Odd
	FW	Odd Frantzen	20 January 1913 (aged 25)	14	(Norway) Hardy
	MF	Kristian Henriksen	3 March 1911 (aged 27)	12	(Norway) Lyn
	MF	Rolf Holmberg	24 August 1914 (aged 23)	18	(Norway) Odd
	DF	Øivind Holmsen	28 April 1912 (aged 26)	22	(Norway) Lyn
	FW	Arne Ileby	2 December 1913 (aged 24)	0	(Norway) Fredrikstad
	FW	Magnar Isaksen	13 October 1910 (aged 27)	12	(Norway) Lyn
	DF	Rolf Johannessen	15 March 1910 (aged 28)	11	(Norway) Fredrikstad
	GK	Henry Johansen	21 July 1904 (aged 33)	44	(Norway) Vålerengen
	DF	Jørgen Juve	22 November 1906 (aged 31)	45	(Norway) Lyn
	FW	Reidar Kvammen	23 July 1914 (aged 23)	29	(Norway) Viking
	GK	Sverre Nordby	13 March 1910 (aged 28)	2	(Norway) Mjøndalen
	DF	Roald Amundsen	18 September 1913 (aged 24)	0	(Norway) Mjøndalen
	DF	Oddmund Andersen	21 December 1915 (aged 22)	1	(Norway) Mjøndalen
	MF	Gunnar Andreassen	5 January 1913 (aged 25)	0	(Norway) Fredrikstad
	FW	Hjalmar Andresen	18 July 1914 (aged 23)	0	(Norway) Sarpsborg
	MF	Sigurd Hansen	23 June 1913 (aged 24)	0	(Norway) Fram Larvik
	GK	Anker Kihle	19 April 1917 (aged 21)	0	(Norway) Storm
	FW	Alf Martinsen	29 December 1911 (aged 26)	17	(Norway) Lillestrøm
	MF	Sverre Berglie	21 October 1910 (aged 27)	0	(Norway) Drafn

1. Note: This player stayed home on reserve. Only 14 members of the squad actually travelled to France.

== Belgium ==
Head coach: (England) Jack Butler

No.	Pos.	Player	Date of birth (age)	Caps	Club
	GK	Arnold Badjou	26 June 1909 (aged 28)	29	(Belgium) Daring Club de Bruxelles Societe Royale
	GK	Robert Braet	11 February 1912 (aged 26)	14	(Belgium) Cercle Brugge
	FW	Raymond Braine	28 April 1907 (aged 31)	47	(Belgium) Royal Beerschot AC
	FW	Fernand Buyle	3 March 1918 (aged 20)	10	(Belgium) Daring Club de Bruxelles Societe Royale
	FW	Jean Capelle	26 October 1913 (aged 24)	30	(Belgium) Royal Standard Club Liège
	FW	Arthur Ceuleers	28 February 1916 (aged 22)	4	(Belgium) Royal Beerschot AC
	MF	Pierre Dalem	16 March 1912 (aged 26)	22	(Belgium) Royal Standard Club Liège
	MF	Alfons De Winter	12 September 1908 (aged 29)	18	(Belgium) Royal Beerschot AC
	FW	Jean Fievez	30 November 1910 (aged 27)	4	(Belgium) White Star Brüssel
	DF	Frans Gommers	5 April 1917 (aged 21)	1	(Belgium) Royal Beerschot AC
	MF	Paul Henry	6 September 1912 (aged 25)	1	(Belgium) Daring Club de Bruxelles Societe Royale
	FW	Hendrik Isemborghs	30 January 1914 (aged 24)	11	(Belgium) Royal Beerschot AC
	FW	Joseph Nelis	1 April 1917 (aged 21)	0	(Belgium) Berchem Sport
	DF	Robert Paverick	29 November 1912 (aged 25)	26	(Belgium) Royal Antwerp F.C.
	DF	Jean Petit	25 February 1914 (aged 24)	4	(Belgium) Royal Standard Club Liege
	DF	Corneel Seys	12 February 1912 (aged 26)	1	(Belgium) Royal Beerschot AC
	DF	Philibert Smellinckx	17 January 1911 (aged 27)	19	(Belgium) Union Royale Saint-Gilloise
	MF	Émile Stijnen	2 November 1907 (aged 30)	25	(Belgium) Royal Olympic Club de Charleroi
	MF	John Van Alphen	17 June 1914 (aged 23)	4	(Belgium) Royal Beerschot AC
	FW	Charles Vanden Wouwer	7 September 1916 (aged 21)	5	(Belgium) Royal Beerschot AC
	GK	André Vandeweyer	21 June 1909 (aged 28)	5	(Belgium) Union Royale Saint-Gilloise
	FW	Bernard Voorhoof	10 May 1910 (aged 28)	54	(Belgium) KSK Liersche

== Netherlands ==
Head coach: (England) Bob Glendenning

No.	Pos.	Player	Date of birth (age)	Caps	Club
	MF	Wim Anderiesen	27 November 1903 (aged 34)	40	(Netherlands) Ajax Amsterdam
	DF	Dick Been	2 July 1909 (aged 28)	0	(Netherlands) Ajax Amsterdam
	DF	Bertus Caldenhove	19 January 1914 (aged 24)	18	(Netherlands) DWS
	FW	Piet de Boer	10 October 1919 (aged 18)	1	(Netherlands) KFC (Kooger FC)
	FW	Bertus de Harder	14 January 1920 (aged 18)	1	(Netherlands) VUC Den Haag
	FW	Arie de Winter	27 October 1913 (aged 24)	0	(Netherlands) HFC Haarlem
	FW	Daaf Drok	23 May 1914 (aged 24)	7	(Netherlands) RFC Rotterdam
	MF	Frans Hogenbirk	18 March 1919 (aged 19)	0	(Netherlands) Be Quick 1887
	GK	Niek Michel	30 September 1912 (aged 25)	0	(Netherlands) VSV Velsen
	FW	Klaas Ooms	9 June 1916 (aged 21)	0	(Netherlands) DWS
	MF	Bas Paauwe	4 October 1911 (aged 26)	21	(Netherlands) SC Feyenoord Rotterdam
	MF	René Pijpers	15 September 1917 (aged 20)	0	(Netherlands) RFC Roermond
	DF	Hendrikus Plenter	23 June 1913 (aged 24)	0	(Netherlands) Be Quick 1887
	FW	Piet Punt	6 February 1909 (aged 29)	1	(Netherlands) DFC Dordrecht
	FW	Kick Smit	3 November 1911 (aged 26)	21	(Netherlands) HFC Haarlem
	FW	Frans van der Veen	25 March 1918 (aged 20)	1	(Netherlands) Heracles Almelo
	MF	Puck van Heel	21 January 1904 (aged 34)	62	(Netherlands) SC Feyenoord Rotterdam
	GK	Adri van Male	7 October 1910 (aged 27)	9	(Netherlands) SC Feyenoord Rotterdam
	FW	Henk van Spaandonck	25 June 1913 (aged 24)	7	(Netherlands) Neptunus Rotterdam
	FW	Leen Vente	14 May 1911 (aged 27)	14	(Netherlands) SC Feyenoord Rotterdam
	DF	Mauk Weber	1 March 1914 (aged 24)	25	(Netherlands) ADO Den Haag
	FW	Frank Wels	21 February 1909 (aged 29)	35	(Netherlands) Unitas Gorinchem

== Dutch East Indies ==
Head coach: (Netherlands) Johan Mastenbroek

No.	Pos.	Player	Date of birth (age)	Caps	Club
	MF	Sutan Anwar	21 March 1914 (aged 24)	0	(Dutch East Indies) VIOS Batavia
	GK	Leen van Beuzekom		0	(Dutch East Indies) Hercules Batavia
	MF	Gerrit Faulhaber	22 September 1912 (aged 25)	0	(Dutch East Indies) Go Ahead Semarang
	DF	Jan Harting		0	(Dutch East Indies) HBS Soerabaja
	DF	Frans G. Hukom	28 September 1915 (aged 22)	0	(Dutch East Indies) Sparta Bandung
	MF	Frans Meeng	18 January 1910 (aged 28)	2	(Dutch East Indies) SVBB Batavia
	MF	Achmad Nawir	30 June 1912 (aged 25)	0	(Dutch East Indies) HBS Soerabaja
	FW	Isaak "Tjaak" Pattiwael	23 February 1914 (aged 24)	0	(Dutch East Indies) Jong Ambon Batavia
	DF	Jack Samuels	29 March 1918 (aged 20)	0	(Dutch East Indies) Excelsior Soerabaja
	FW	Suvarte Soedarmadji	6 December 1915 (aged 22)	0	(Dutch East Indies) HBS Soerabaja
	FW	M.J. Hans Taihuttu	1909	0	(Dutch East Indies) Jong Ambon Batavia
	FW	Tan Hong Djien	12 January 1916 (aged 22)	3	(Dutch East Indies) Tiong Hoa Soerabaja
	GK	Tan "Bing" Mo Heng	28 February 1913 (aged 25)	0	(Dutch East Indies) HCTNH Soerabaja
	FW	Tan See Han	1910	0	(Dutch East Indies) Gie Hoo Soerabaja
	FW	Rudi Telwe		0	(Dutch East Indies) HBS Soerabaja
	MF	G. Van Den Burgh		0	(Dutch East Indies) SVV Semarang
	FW	Hendrikus V. "Henk" Zomers	19 November 1912 (aged 25)	0	(Dutch East Indies) Hercules Batavia

== Coaches representation by country ==
Nº	Country	Coaches
2	Hungary	Károly Dietz, József Nagy (Sweden)
2	England	Jack Butler (Belgium), Bob Glendenning (Netherlands)
2	(Nazi Germany) Germany	Sepp Herberger, Karl Rappan (Switzerland)
2	Romania	Costel Rădulescu, Alexandru Săvulescu
1	Brazil	Adhemar Pimenta
1	Cuba	José Tapia
1	Czechoslovakia	Josef Meissner
1	France	Gaston Barreau
1	Italy	Vittorio Pozzo
1	Netherlands	Johan Mastenbroek (Dutch East Indies)
1	Norway	Asbjørn Halvorsen
1	Poland	Józef Kałuża
