= Asian nations at the FIFA World Cup =

International football delegations

Association football is among the most popular sports in Asia, with 15 members of the Asian Football Confederation having competed at the sport's biggest international event, the men's FIFA World Cup. The highest ranked result in the World Cup for an Asian team is fourth place in the 2002 tournament by South Korea. AFC countries have hosted the finals two times.

== Overview ==
	1930 (Uruguay) (13)	1934 (Italy) (16)	1938 (France) (15)	1950 (Brazil) (13)	1954 (Switzerland) (16)	1958 (Sweden) (16)	1962 (Chile) (16)	1966 (England) (16)	1970 (Mexico) (16)	1974 (West Germany) (16)	1978 (Argentina) (16)	1982 (Spain) (24)	1986 (Mexico) (24)	1990 (Italy) (24)	1994 (United States) (24)	1998 (France) (32)	2002 (South Korea) (Japan) (32)	2006 (Germany) (32)	2010 (South Africa) (32)	2014 (Brazil) (32)	2018 (Russia) (32)	2022 (Qatar) (32)	2026 (Canada) (Mexico) (United States) (48)	2030 (Morocco) (Portugal) (Spain) (48)	2034 (Saudi Arabia) (48)	Total
Teams	0	0	(Dutch East Indies) (Note: Prior to independence in 1945 competed as Dutch East Indies, including their only World Cup finals appearance in 1938.)	0	(South Korea)	0	0	(North Korea)	(Israel)	0	(Iran)	(Kuwait)	(South Korea) (Iraq)	(South Korea) (United Arab Emirates)	(South Korea) (Saudi Arabia)	(South Korea) (Japan) (Iran) (Saudi Arabia)	(South Korea) (Japan) (China) (Saudi Arabia)	(South Korea) (Japan) (Iran) (Saudi Arabia)	(South Korea) (Japan) (North Korea) (Australia)	(South Korea) (Japan) (Iran) (Australia)	(South Korea) (Japan) (Iran) (Australia) (Saudi Arabia)	(South Korea) (Japan) (Iran) (Australia) (Saudi Arabia) (Qatar)	(South Korea) (Japan) (Iran) (Australia) (Saudi Arabia) (Qatar) (Iraq) (Jordan) (Uzbekistan)		(Saudi Arabia)	52
Top 32	—	—	—	—	—	—	—	—	—	—	—	—	—	—	—	—	—	—	—	—	—	—	2			2
Top 16	—	—	—	—	—	—	—	—	—	—	—	0 (Note: In 1982, the second round featured 12 teams of which 4 advanced to the semi-finals.)	0	0	1	0	2	0	2	0	1	3	0			9
Top 8	—	0	0	—	0	0	0	1	0	0	0	0	0	0	0	0	1	0	0	0	0	0	0			2
Top 4	0	0	0	0	0	0	0	0	0	0	0	0	0	0	0	0	1	0	0	0	0	0	0			1
Top 2	0	0	0	0	0	0	0	0	0	0	0	0	0	0	0	0	0	0	0	0	0	0	0			0
1st																										0
2nd																										0
3rd																										0
4th																	(South Korea)									1

Country	No.	Years (Note: Bold indicates year(s) of best finish.)	Best result
**South Korea**	12	1954, 1986, 1990, 1994, 1998, **2002**, 2006, 2010, 2014, 2018, 2022, 2026	4th
**Japan**	8	1998, **2002**, 2006, **2010**, 2014, **2018**, **2022**, 2026	R16
**Iran**	7	1978, 1998, 2006, 2014, 2018, 2022, 2026	GS
**Australia** (Note: In 2006 Australia qualified through OFC qualifying competition however the Football Federation Australia officially left the OFC and joined the AFC on 1 January 2006. They qualified in 1974 as a member of OFC.)	7	(1974, **2006**), 2010, 2014, 2018, **2022**, 2026	R16
**Saudi Arabia**	7	**1994**, 1998, 2002, 2006, 2018, 2022, 2026	R16
**North Korea**	2	**1966**, 2010	QF
**Qatar**	2	2022, 2026	GS
**Iraq**	2	1986, 2026	GS
**Indonesia**	1	1938	R1
**Israel** (Note: Israel was an AFC member when they appeared in the 1970 World Cup. They were expelled from AFC in 1974 and joined UEFA in 1994.)	1	1970	GS
**Kuwait**	1	1982	GS
**United Arab Emirates**	1	1990	GS
**China**	1	2002	GS
**Jordan**	1	2026	GS
**Uzbekistan**	1	2026	GS

== Results ==
=== Tournament standings ===
Team	Champions	Final	Semi-finals	Quarter-finals (Note: Knockout round of 8: 1934–1938, 1954–1970, and 1986–present; second group stage, top 8: 1974–1978)	Round of 16 (Note: Second group stage, top 12: 1982; knockout round of 16: 1986–present)	Round of 32 (Note: Knockout round of 32: 2026–present)
South Korea	0	0	1	1	3	0
North Korea	0	0	0	1	0	0
Japan	0	0	0	0	4	1
Australia	0	0	0	0	2	1
Saudi Arabia	0	0	0	0	1	0

=== Team results by tournament ===
The team ranking in each tournament is according to FIFA. The rankings, apart from the top four positions (top two in 1930), are not a result of direct competition between the teams; instead, teams eliminated in the same round are ranked by their full results in the tournament.

For each tournament, the number of teams in each finals tournament (in brackets) are shown.

FIFA World Cup results of AFC members
Team	1930 (Uruguay) (13)	1934 (Italy) (16)	1938 (France) (15)	1950 (Brazil) (13)	1954 (Switzerland) (16)	1958 (Sweden) (16)	1962 (Chile) (16)	1966 (England) (16)	1970 (Mexico) (16)	1974 (West Germany) (16)	1978 (Argentina) (16)	1982 (Spain) (24)	1986 (Mexico) (24)	1990 (Italy) (24)	1994 (United States) (24)	1998 (France) (32)	2002 (South Korea) (Japan) (32)	2006 (Germany) (32)	2010 (South Africa) (32)	2014 (Brazil) (32)	2018 (Russia) (32)	2022 (Qatar) (32)	2026 (Canada) (Mexico) (United States) (48)	2030 (Morocco) (Portugal) (Spain) (48)	2034 (Saudi Arabia) (48)	Total	Qual. Comp.
Australia	—N/a							•	•	GS1; 14th	•	•	•	•	•	•	•	R16; 16th	GS; 21st	GS; 30th	GS; 30th	R16; 11th	R32; 22nd	TBD	TBD	7	16
Australia	—N/a							member of OFC											GS; 21st	GS; 30th	GS; 30th	R16; 11th	R32; 22nd	TBD	TBD	7	16
China (Note: On 14 June 1952, FIFA acknowledged that the CFA on Mainland China, not the Republic of China Football Association (ROCFA) located on Taiwan, was the recognized authority over Chinese football with their membership dating to 1931.)	—N/a					•						•	•	•	•	•	GS; 31st	•	•	•	•	•	•	TBD	TBD	1	13
Indonesia			R16; 15th	×		•×	×			•	•	•	•	•	•	•	•	•	•	•	×	•	•	TBD	TBD	1	15
Iran	—N/a									•	GS1; 14th	×	×	•	•	GS; 20th	•	GS; T-25th	•	GS; 28th	GS; 18th	GS; 26th	GS; 33rd	TBD	TBD	7	12
Iraq	—N/a									•	×	•	GS; 23rd	•	•	•	•	•	•	•	•	•	GS; 48th	TBD	TBD	2	13
Israel		•	•	•	•	•	•	•	GS; 12th	OFC		UEFA	OFC		member of UEFA											1	8
Japan	××		×		•		•		•	•	•	•	•	•	•	GS; 31st	R16; 9th	GS; 28th	R16; 9th	GS; 28th	R16; 15th	R16; 9th	R32; 21st	TBD	TBD	8	17
Jordan	—N/a														•	•	•	•	•	•	•	•	GS; 44th	TBD	TBD	1	9
Kuwait	—N/a									•	•	GS1; 21st	•	•	•	•	•	•	•	•	•×	•	•	TBD	TBD	1	14
North Korea	—N/a							QF; 8th	•	•	•	•	•	•	•			•	GS; 32nd	•	•	•×	•	TBD	TBD	2	14
Qatar	—N/a									×	•	•	•	•	•	•	•	•	•	•	•	GS; 32nd	GS; 41st	TBD	TBD	2	13
Saudi Arabia	—N/a										•	•	•	•	R16; 12th	GS; 28th	GS; 32nd	GS; 28th	•	•	GS; 26th	GS; 25th	GS; 38th	TBD	Q	8	13
South Korea	—N/a				GS; 16th	×	•	×	•	•	•	•	GS; 20th	GS; 22nd	GS; 20th	GS; 30th	4th	GS; 17th	R16; 15th	GS; 27th	GS; 19th	R16; 16th	GS; 34th	TBD	TBD	12	17
United Arab Emirates	—N/a										×		•	GS; 24th	•	•	•	•	•	•	•	•	•	TBD	TBD	1	11
Uzbekistan	Part of Soviet Union														—N/a	•	•	•	•	•	•	•	GS; 46th	TBD	TBD	1	8

Legend

1st	Champions
2nd	Runners-up
3rd	Third place
4th	Fourth place
QF	Quarter-finals (1934–1938, 1954–1970, 1986–present)
R16	Knockout round of 16 (1934–1938, 1986–present)
R32	Knockout round of 32 (2026–present)
GS	Group stage (1930, 1950–1970, 1986–present)
GS1	First group stage (1974–1982)
GS2	Second group stage (1974–1982)

Q	Qualified for upcoming tournament
TBD	To be determined (may still qualify for upcoming tournament)
••	Qualified, but withdrew
××	Invited, but withdrew
•	Did not qualify
•×	Withdrew or disqualified during qualification (after playing matches)
×	Withdrew before qualification / Banned / Entry not accepted by FIFA
	Hosts
	Did not enter
—N/a	Not a FIFA member

=== Overall team records ===
As per statistical convention in football, matches decided in extra time are counted as wins and losses, while matches decided by penalty shoot-outs are counted as draws. 3 points per win, 1 point per draw and 0 points per loss.

As of 2026 FIFA World Cup

Team	Part	Pld	W	D	L	GF	GA	GD	Pts
South Korea	12	41	8	10	23	41	81	–40	34
Japan	8	29	8	8	13	33	38	–5	32
Australia	7	24	5	6	13	20	40	–20	21
Iran	7	21	3	7	11	16	34	–18	16
Saudi Arabia	7	22	4	4	14	15	49	–34	16
North Korea	2	7	1	1	5	6	21	–15	4
Israel	1	3	0	2	1	1	3	–2	2
Kuwait	1	3	0	1	2	2	6	–4	1
Qatar	2	6	0	1	5	3	17	–14	1
Jordan	1	3	0	0	3	3	8	−5	0
Indonesia	1	1	0	0	1	0	6	–6	0
United Arab Emirates	1	3	0	0	3	2	11	–9	0
Uzbekistan	1	3	0	0	3	2	11	−9	0
China	1	3	0	0	3	0	9	–9	0
Iraq	2	6	0	0	6	2	16	–14	0

== Appearances ==
=== Ranking of teams by number of appearances ===
Team	Appearances	Record streak	Active streak	Debut	Most recent	Best result (* = hosts)
South Korea	12	11	11	1954	2026	Fourth place (2002*)
Japan	8	8	8	1998	2026	Round of 16 (2002*, 2010, 2018, 2022)
Iran	7	4	4	1978	2026	First round / Group stage
Australia	7	6	6	1974	2026	Round of 16 (2006, 2022)
Saudi Arabia	7	4	3	1994	2026	Round of 16 (1994)
North Korea	2	1	0	1966	2010	Quarter-finals (1966)
Qatar	2	2	2	2022	2026	Group stage*
Iraq	2	1	1	1986	2026	Group stage
Indonesia	1	1	0	1938	1938	First round
Israel	1	1	0	1970	1970	Group stage
Kuwait	1	1	0	1982	1982	Group stage
United Arab Emirates	1	1	0	1990	1990	Group stage
China	1	1	0	2002	2002	Group stage
Jordan	1	1	1	2026	2026	Group stage
Uzbekistan	1	1	1	2026	2026	Group stage

=== Team debuts ===
Year	Debutants	Total
1938	Dutch East Indies	1
1954	South Korea	1
1966	North Korea	1
1970	Israel	1
1974	Australia	1
1978	Iran	1
1982	Kuwait	1
1986	Iraq	1
1990	United Arab Emirates	1
1994	Saudi Arabia	1
1998	Japan	1
2002	China	1
2022	Qatar	1
2026	Jordan, Uzbekistan	2
Total		15

=== Not qualified ===
32 of the 46 active FIFA and AFC members have never appeared in the final tournament.

Country	Number of qualifying attempts	1930 (Uruguay)	1934 (Italy)	1938 (France)	1950 (Brazil)	1954 (Switzerland)	1958 (Sweden)	1962 (Chile)	1966 (England)	1970 (Mexico)	1974 (West Germany)	1978 (Argentina)	1982 (Spain)	1986 (Mexico)	1990 (Italy)	1994 (United States)	1998 (France)	2002 (South Korea) (Japan)	2006 (Germany)	2010 (South Africa)	2014 (Brazil)	2018 (Russia)	2022 (Qatar)	2026 (Canada) (Mexico) (United States)	2030 (Morocco) (Portugal) (Spain)	2034 (Saudi Arabia)
Syria (Note: Syria entered qualifying in 1962 as part of United Arab Republic, but withdrew before playing a match)	15	—N/a			•×		•	×	×		•	•×	•	•	•	•	•	•	•	•	×	•	•	•	TBD	TBD
Hong Kong	14	—N/a									•	•	•	•	•	•	•	•	•	•	•	•	•	•	TBD	TBD
Malaysia	14	—N/a									•	•	•	•	•	•	•	•	•	•	•	•	•	•	TBD	TBD
Thailand (Note: Siam was invited to the 1930 WC, but withdrew.)	14	××									•	•	•	•	•	•	•	•	•	•	•	•	•	•	TBD	TBD
Chinese Taipei (Note: Entered World Cup qualifying as Taiwan in 1954, 1958, and 1978)	13	—N/a				×	×					•	•	•	•	•	•	•	•	•	•	•	•	•	TBD	TBD
Singapore	13	—N/a										•	•	•	•	•	•	•	•	•	•	•	•	•	TBD	TBD
Bahrain	12	—N/a										•	•	•	×	•	•	•	•	•	•	•	•	•	TBD	TBD
Bangladesh	11	—N/a			Part of Pakistan						—N/a			•	•	•	•	•	•	•	•	•	•	•	TBD	TBD
India	11	—N/a			••	×					×			•	×	•	•	•	•	•	•	•	•	•	TBD	TBD
Macau	11	—N/a											•	•		•	•	•	•	•	•	•	•	•	TBD	TBD
Yemen (Note: Prior to unification with South Yemen in 1990, Yemen competed as North Yemen)	11	—N/a												•	•	•	•	•	•	•	•	•	•	•	TBD	TBD
Oman	10	—N/a												×	•	•	•	•	•	•	•	•	•	•	TBD	TBD
Pakistan	10	—N/a													•	•	•	•	•	•	•	•	•	•	TBD	TBD
Vietnam (Note: Represented by South Vietnam from 1949 until 1975. North and South Vietnam maintained separate football teams from 1954 to 1975 (see North Vietnam national football team for information on the North Vietnam team). The current Vietnam national football team is considered a successor of the South Vietnam team as North Vietnam was not a FIFA member.)	10	—N/a				×					•					•	•	•	•	•	•	•	•	•	TBD	TBD
Lebanon	9	—N/a												×		•	•	•	•	•	•	•	•	•	TBD	TBD
Nepal	9	—N/a												•	•		•	•	×	•	•	•	•	•	TBD	TBD
Sri Lanka (Note: Entered World Cup qualifying as Ceylon in 1974)	9	—N/a									×	×				•	•	•	•	•	•	•	•	•	TBD	TBD
Maldives	8	—N/a													×		•	•	•	•	•	•	•	•	TBD	TBD
Tajikistan	8	Part of Soviet Union														—N/a	•	•	•	•	•	•	•	•	TBD	TBD
Turkmenistan	8	Part of Soviet Union														—N/a	•	•	•	•	•	•	•	•	TBD	TBD
Kyrgyzstan	8	Part of Soviet Union														—N/a	•	•	•	•	•	•	•	•	TBD	TBD
Cambodia	7	—N/a															•	•	×	•	•	•	•	•	TBD	TBD
Mongolia	7	—N/a																•	•	•	•	•	•	•	TBD	TBD
Palestine	7	—N/a																•	•	•	•	•	•	•	TBD	TBD
Afghanistan	6	—N/a																	•	•	•	•	•	•	TBD	TBD
Laos	6	—N/a																•	•		•	•	•	•	TBD	TBD
Philippines	6				×				×		×						•	•			•	•	•	•	TBD	TBD
Brunei	5	—N/a												•				•			×	•	•	•	TBD	TBD
Timor-Leste	5	—N/a										Part of Indonesia						—N/a		•	•	•	•	•	TBD	TBD
Myanmar (Note: Entered World Cup qualifying as Burma in 1950)	5	—N/a			×											×		×	×	•	•	•	•	•	TBD	TBD
Guam	4	—N/a																•	×	×	×	•	•	•	TBD	TBD
Bhutan	3	—N/a																				•	•	•	TBD	TBD
South Yemen	1	—N/a												•	×	Part of Yemen										

Legend

TBD	To be determined (may still qualify for upcoming tournament)
•	Did not qualify
•×	Withdrew or disqualified during qualification (after playing matches)
×	Withdrew before qualification / Banned / Entry not accepted by FIFA
••	Qualified, but withdrew before finals
××	Invited, but withdrew before finals
	Did not enter
—N/a	Not a FIFA member

== Summary of performance ==
This table shows the number of countries represented at the World Cup, the number of entries (#E) from around the world including any rejections and withdrawals, the number of Asian entries (#A), how many of those Asian entries withdrawn (#A-) before/during qualification or were rejected by FIFA, the Asian representatives at the World Cup finals, the number of World Cup Qualifiers each Asian representative had to play to get to the World Cup (#WCQ), the furthest stage reached, results, and coaches.

Year	Host	Size	#E	#A	#A-	Asian finalists	#WCQ	Stage	Results	Coach
1930	Uruguay	13	13	0	0	–				
1934	Italy	16	32	2	1 (Note: Entered in Africa and Asia. Turkey withdrew. Palestine football team consisted of nine British footballers, six Jewish footballers and one Arab footballer. FIFA states in reference to the 1930s Palestine Mandate team that The term 'Palestine team' that had participated in previous competitions in the 1930s was actually the forerunner of today's Israel team and as such bears no relation to the national team of the Palestinian authority." However, the region currently known as Palestine is considered "one of the first Asian teams to compete in the FIFA World Cup qualifiers".)	–				
1938	France	15	37	2	1 (Note: Japan withdrew.)	Dutch East Indies	0	Round of 16	lost 0–6 Hungary	(Netherlands) Johan Mastenbroek
1950	Brazil	13	34	4	4 (Note: Burma, the Philippines and Indonesia all withdrew, so India qualified automatically. But India later also withdrew "because of the expense of travelling such a long way to play" or, according to some reports, after a FIFA ruling that players were not allowed to play barefoot, and FIFA decided not to invite anyone else, leaving the World Cup three teams short.)	–				
1954	Switzerland	16	45	3	1 (Note: China PR withdrew the qualification.)	South Korea	2	Group stage	lost 0–9 Hungary, lost 0–7 Turkey	(South Korea) Kim Yong-sik
1958	Sweden	16	55	12	9 (Note: FIFA rejected the entries of Ethiopia and South Korea; China PR, Hong Kong, Turkey, Cyprus withdrew at the first round;Indonesia withdrew after FIFA rejected their request to play against Israel on neutral ground. Israel advanced to the Final Round automatically. Egypt withdrew, so Sudan advanced to the Final Round automatically; Sudan refused to play against Israel for political reasons, so Israel would technically qualify automatically, but before the qualification rounds began, FIFA ruled that no team would qualify without playing at least one match (except for the defending champions and the hosts), and Israel had yet to play any.)	–				
1962	Chile	16	56	3	1 (Note: Indonesia withdrew.)	–				
1966	England	16	74	4	2 (Note: Originally this was to be a four team group stage between Australia, North Korea, South Africa and South Korea played in Japan. However South Africa was suspended and South Korea withdrew because the 3 team tournament was moved from Japan to Cambodia. Because North Korea lacked diplomatic relations with most countries, finding a suitable venue for the match proved difficult, until Head of State Norodom Sihanouk, an ally of Kim Il-sung, said the matches could be held in Phnom Penh. The winner (North Korea) qualified for the eighth FIFA World Cup held in England.)	North Korea	2	Quarter-finals	lost 0–3 Soviet Union, drew 1–1 Chile, won 1–0 Italy; QF: lost 3–5 Portugal	(North Korea) Myung Rye-hyun
1970	Mexico	16	75	7 (Note: Israel qualified for their only World Cup to date as an Asian team. However, soon after this, they left the Asian Football Confederation, and nowadays compete in the European zone as they are now a member of UEFA.)	1 (Note: North Korea withdrew)	Israel	4	Group stage	lost 0–2 Uruguay, drew 1–1 Sweden, drew 0–0 Italy	(Israel) Emmanuel Scheffer
1974	West Germany	16	99	18	3 (Note: India, Sri Lanka and the Philippines withdrew)	–				
1978	Argentina	16	107	21	4 (Note: Sri Lanka, North Korea, Iraq, United Arab Emirates withdrew)	Iran	12	First round	lost 0–3 Netherlands, drew 1–1 Scotland, lost 1–4 Peru	(Iran) Heshmat Mohajerani
1982	Spain	24	109	21	1 (Note: Iran withdrew before the draw was made)	Kuwait	9	First round	drew 1–1 Czechoslovakia, lost 1–4 France, lost 0–1 England	(Brazil) Carlos Alberto Parreira
1986	Mexico	24	121	28	4 (Note: Chinese Taipei were assigned to the Oceanian zone instead. Oman, Lebanon withdrew. Iran was disqualified)	Iraq	8	Group stage	lost 0–1 Paraguay, lost 1–2 Belgium, lost 0–1 Mexico	(Brazil) Evaristo de Macedo
1986	Mexico	24	121	28	4	South Korea	8	Group stage	lost 1–3 Argentina, drew 1–1 Bulgaria, lost 2–3 Italy	(South Korea) Kim Jung-Nam
1990	Italy	24	116	26	2 (Note: Bahrain, India, Maldives and South Yemen withdrew without playing a qualifying match.)	South Korea	11	Group stage	lost 0–2 Belgium, lost 1–3 Spain, lost 0–1 Uruguay	(South Korea) Lee Hoe-taik
1990	Italy	24	116	26	2	United Arab Emirates	9	Group stage	lost 0–2 Colombia, lost 1–5 West Germany, lost 1–4 Yugoslavia	(Brazil) Carlos Alberto Parreira
1994	United States	24	147	30	2 (Note: Myanmar and Nepal withdrew.)	Saudi Arabia	11	Round of 16	lost 1–2 Netherlands, won 2–1 Morocco, won 1–0 Belgium; R16: lost 1–3 Sweden	(Argentina) Jorge Solari
1994	United States	24	147	30	2	South Korea	13	Group stage	drew 2–2 Spain, drew 0–0 Bolivia, lost 2–3 Germany	(South Korea) Kim Ho
1998	France	32	174	36	0	Iran	17	Group stage	lost 0–1 FR Yugoslavia, won 2–1 United States, lost 0–2 Germany	(Iran) Jalal Talebi
1998	France	32	174	36	0	Japan	14	Group stage	lost 0–1 Argentina, lost 0–1 Croatia, lost 1–2 Jamaica	(Japan) Takeshi Okada
1998	France	32	174	36	0	Saudi Arabia	14	Group stage	lost 0–1 Denmark, lost 0–4 France, drew 2–2 South Africa	(Brazil) Carlos Alberto Parreira (fired after two matches, replaced by (Saudi Arabia) Mohammed Al-Kharashy for the final match)
1998	France	32	174	36	0	South Korea	12	Group stage	lost 1–3 Mexico, lost 0–5 Netherlands, drew 1–1 Belgium	(South Korea) Cha Bum-kun (fired after two matches, replaced by (South Korea) Kim Pyung-seok for the final match)
2002	South Korea; Japan	32	199	35	5 (Note: Myanmar withdrew from the tournament after being placed in Group 2 but before any matches had been played, therefore reducing the group to 3 teams. Afghanistan, Bhutan, North Korea and Timor-Leste did not participate in the qualification process.)	China	14	Group stage	lost 0–2 Costa Rica, lost 0–4 Brazil, lost 0–3 Turkey	(Federal Republic of Yugoslavia) Bora Milutinović
2002	South Korea; Japan	32	199	35	5	Japan	0	Round of 16	drew 2–2 Belgium, won 1–0 Russia, won 2–0 Tunisia; R16: lost 0–1 Turkey	(France) Philippe Troussier
2002	South Korea; Japan	32	199	35	5	Saudi Arabia	14	Group stage	lost 0–8 Germany, lost 0–1 Cameroon, lost 0–3 Republic of Ireland	(Saudi Arabia) Nasser Al-Johar
2002	South Korea; Japan	32	199	35	5	South Korea	0	Fourth place	won 2–0 Poland, drew 1–1 United States, won 1–0 Portugal; R16: won 2–1 (a.s.d.e.t.) Italy; QF: won 0–0 (5–3 p) Spain; SF: lost 0–1 Germany; 3rd: lost 2–3 Turkey	(Netherlands) Guus Hiddink
2006	Germany	32	197	44	5 (Note: Cambodia, Philippines, Bhutan and Brunei decided not to take part, and Myanmar was banned from the competition.)	Iran	12	Group stage	lost 1–3 Mexico, lost 0–2 Portugal, drew 1–1 Angola	(Croatia) Branko Ivanković
2006	Germany	32	197	44	5	Japan	12	Group stage	lost 1–3 Australia, drew 0–0 Croatia, lost 1–4 Brazil	(Brazil) Zico
2006	Germany	32	197	44	5	Saudi Arabia	12	Group stage	drew 2–2 Tunisia, lost 0–4 Ukraine, lost 0–1 Spain	(Brazil) Marcos Paquetá
2006	Germany	32	197	44	5	South Korea	12	Group stage	won 2–1 Togo, drew 1–1 France, lost 0–2 Switzerland	(Netherlands) Dick Advocaat
2010	South Africa	32	205	(Note: The first time Australia attempted to qualify for the World Cup as a member of the AFC.) 43	3 (Note: Laos, Brunei and the Philippines did not attempt to qualify.)	Australia	14	Group stage	lost 0–4 Germany, drew 1–1 Ghana, won 2–1 Serbia	(Netherlands) Pim Verbeek
2010	South Africa	32	205	43	3	Japan	14	Round of 16	won 1–0 Cameroon, lost 0–1 Netherlands, won 3–1 Denmark; R16: lost 0–0 (3-5 p) Paraguay	(Japan) Takeshi Okada
2010	South Africa	32	205	43	3	North Korea	16	Group stage	lost 1–2 Brazil, lost 0–7 Portugal, lost 0–3 Ivory Coast	(North Korea) Kim Jong-hun
2010	South Africa	32	205	43	3	South Korea	14	Round of 16	won 2–0 Greece, lost 1–4 Argentina, drew 2–2 Nigeria; R16: lost 1–2 Uruguay	(South Korea) Huh Jung-moo
2014	Brazil	32	203	43	3 (Note: Brunei were suspended by FIFA from September 2009 through May 2011. Their reinstatement came too late for Brunei to participate in the 2014 FIFA World Cup. Bhutan and Guam are not participating in the 2014 FIFA World Cup.)	Australia	14	Group stage	lost 1–3 Chile, lost 2–3 Netherlands, lost 0–3 Spain	(Australia) Ange Postecoglou
2014	Brazil	32	203	43	3	Iran	16	Group stage	drew 0–0 Nigeria, lost 0–1 Argentina, lost 1–3 Bosnia and Herzegovina	(Portugal) Carlos Queiroz
2014	Brazil	32	203	43	3	Japan	14	Group stage	lost 1–2 Ivory Coast, drew 0–0 Greece, lost 1–4 Colombia	(Italy) Alberto Zaccheroni
2014	Brazil	32	203	43	3	South Korea	14	Group stage	drew 1–1 Russia, lost 2–4 Algeria, lost 0–1 Belgium	(South Korea) Hong Myung-bo
2018	Russia	32	210	46	0	Australia	22	Group stage	lost 1–2 France, drew 1–1 Denmark, lost 0–2 Peru	(Netherlands) Bert van Marwijk
2018	Russia	32	210	46	0	Iran	18	Group stage	won 1–0 Morocco, lost 0–1 Spain, drew 1–1 Portugal	(Portugal) Carlos Queiroz
2018	Russia	32	210	46	0	Japan	18	Round of 16	won 2–1 Colombia, drew 2–2 Senegal, lost 0–1 Poland; R16: lost 2–3 Belgium	(Japan) Akira Nishino
2018	Russia	32	210	46	0	Saudi Arabia	18	Group stage	lost 0–5 Russia, lost 0–1 Uruguay, won 2–1 Egypt	(Argentina) Juan Antonio Pizzi
2018	Russia	32	210	46	0	South Korea	18	Group stage	lost 0–1 Sweden, lost 1–2 Mexico, won 2–0 Germany	(South Korea) Shin Tae-yong
2022	Qatar	32	206	46	1	Australia	20	Round of 16	lost 1–4 France, won 1–0 Tunisia, won 1–0 Denmark; R16: lost 1–2 Argentina	(Australia) Graham Arnold
2022	Qatar	32	206	46	1	Iran	18	Group stage	lost 2–6 England, won 2–0 Wales, lost 0–1 United States	(Portugal) Carlos Queiroz
2022	Qatar	32	206	46	1	Japan	18	Round of 16	won 2–1 Germany, lost 0–1 Costa Rica, won 2–1 Spain; R16: lost 1–1 (1–3 p) Croatia	(Japan) Hajime Moriyasu
2022	Qatar	32	206	46	1	Qatar	8	Group stage	lost 0–2 Ecuador, lost 1–3 Senegal, lost 0–2 Netherlands	(Spain) Félix Sánchez
2022	Qatar	32	206	46	1	Saudi Arabia	18	Group stage	won 2–1 Argentina, lost 0–2 Poland, lost 1–2 Mexico	(France) Hervé Renard
2022	Qatar	32	206	46	1	South Korea	16	Round of 16	drew 0–0 Uruguay, lost 2–3 Ghana, won 2–1 Portugal; R16: lost 1–4 Brazil	(Portugal) Paulo Bento
2026	Canada; Mexico; United States	48	208	46	0	Australia	16	Round of 32	won 2–0 Turkey, lost 0–2 United States, drew 0–0 Paraguay; R32: lost 1–1 (2–4 p) Egypt	(Australia) Tony Popovic
2026	Canada; Mexico; United States	48	208	46	0	Iran	16	Group stage	drew 2–2 New Zealand, drew 0–0 Belgium, drew 1–1 Egypt	(Iran) Amir Ghalenoei
2026	Canada; Mexico; United States	48	208	46	0	Iraq	21	Group stage	lost 1–4 Norway, lost 0–3 France, lost 0–5 Senegal	(Australia) Graham Arnold
2026	Canada; Mexico; United States	48	208	46	0	Japan	16	Round of 32	drew 2–2 Netherlands, won 4–0 Tunisia, drew 1–1 Sweden; R32: lost 1–2 Brazil	(Japan) Hajime Moriyasu
2026	Canada; Mexico; United States	48	208	46	0	Jordan	16	Group stage	lost 1–3 Austria, lost 1–2 Algeria, lost 1–3 Argentina	(Morocco) Jamal Sellami
2026	Canada; Mexico; United States	48	208	46	0	Qatar	18	Group stage	drew 1–1 Switzerland, lost 0–6 Canada, lost 1–3 Bosnia and Herzegovina	(Spain) Julen Lopetegui
2026	Canada; Mexico; United States	48	208	46	0	Saudi Arabia	18	Group stage	drew 1–1 Uruguay, lost 0–4 Spain, drew 0–0 Cape Verde	(Greece) Georgios Donis
2026	Canada; Mexico; United States	48	208	46	0	South Korea	16	Group stage	won 2–1 Czech Republic, lost 0–1 Mexico, lost 0–1 South Africa	(South Korea) Hong Myung-bo
2026	Canada; Mexico; United States	48	208	46	0	Uzbekistan	16	Group stage	lost 1–3 Colombia, lost 0–5 Portugal, lost 1–3 DR Congo	(Italy) Fabio Cannavaro

== Competitive record ==
=== 1938: The first Asian nation at the World Cup ===
The Indonesian team, prior to independence in 1945 (as the Dutch East Indies). Indonesia was the first Asian team to participate in the FIFA World Cup when the team qualified for the 1938 tournament after its opponent, Japan, withdrew from the qualification heats. The 6–0 loss to eventual finalists Hungary in the first round of the tournament in Reims, France, remains the nation's only appearance in the World Cup. The straight knock-out format used at the time made it the only game ever played by the Indonesians. Thus, Indonesia holds the World Cup record as the team with the fewest matches played (1) and one of the teams with the fewest goals scored (0). They were 15th place in the rankings.

=== 1950: India's withdrawal ===
Burma, Philippines and Indonesia withdrew before the draw, so India qualified automatically. India later also withdrew because of the expense of traveling. Other teams economized by sailing, rather than flying, to the tournament. FIFA decided not to invite another team, leaving the World Cup three teams short.

=== 1954: South Korea's first World Cup ===
In the 1954 FIFA World Cup qualification, the Asian zone was allocated one place (out of 16) in the final tournament. In the 1954 World Cup qualification, three countries from the AFC participated. China PR withdrew, South Korea won against Japan and for the first time qualified for the World Cup. South Korea lost twice 0–9 to Hungary and 0–7 to Turkey. They were 16th place in the rankings.

=== 1958–1962: World Cup without Asia ===
At the 1958 World Cup qualification, FIFA rejected South Korea's entry. Qualifications were held with Africa, Turkey, Cyprus and China PR withdrew in the first qualification round, Indonesia and Egypt in second. Sudan withdrew in the final qualification round as they refused to play against Israel for political reasons. Israel technically would have qualified automatically, but before the qualification rounds began, FIFA ruled that no team would qualify without playing at least one match (except for the defending champions and the hosts), and Israel had yet to play any. A special play-off was created between Israel and the runner-up of one of the UEFA Groups, where the teams played against each other on a home-and-away basis, with the winner qualifying. After Belgium refused, Wales, the runner-up of UEFA Group 4, was the team drawn from the UEFA group runners-up. Israel lost both times 0–2 and did not reach the World Cup.

There was only one round of play at the 1962 FIFA World Cup qualification. The three teams played against each other on a home-and-away basis. The group winner would advance to the UEFA/AFC Intercontinental play-off. Indonesia withdrew. South Korea won twice against Japan and advanced to the UEFA/AFC Intercontinental play-off. South Korea lost both times against Yugoslavia and did not reach the World Cup.

=== 1966: North Korea's impressive performance ===
AFC, CAF, OFC confederations competed together in the qualification rounds. After having no teams from Africa or Asia qualifying for the previous two World Cups, FIFA decided to allocate a single spot to the winner of a four-way play-off between the winners of three African groups and the winner of the Asian zone. South Africa was suspended by FIFA due to apartheid. All 15 remaining African teams withdrew in protest against there being no automatic qualification for an African team, leaving the AFC–OFC winner to qualify by default. Japan then withdrew because the three-team tournament was moved from Japan to Cambodia, leaving only Australia and North Korea to contest the final place. Because North Korea lacked diplomatic relations with most countries, finding a suitable venue for the match proved difficult, until Head of State Norodom Sihanouk, an ally of Kim Il Sung, agreed to host the matches in Phnom Penh. North Korea easily won both legs to qualify. North Korea qualified for the eighth FIFA World Cup held in England.

North Korea got to Group 4. North Korea predictably lost the first game against the USSR by 0–3, the second was 1–1 against Chile. However, in an upset North Korea beat Italy 1–0 at Ayresome Park, Middlesbrough, and finished above them, thus earning qualification to the next round along with the USSR. This was the first time that a nation from outside Europe or the Americas had progressed from the first stage of a World Cup. In their match against Portugal, they lead 3–0 after only 22 minutes. Portugal's Eusébio changed the pace, scoring four goals in the game and José Augusto added a fifth in the 78th minute to earn Portugal a 5–3 win. In a 1999 documentary featuring interviews with surviving members of the team, they describe themselves as having been welcomed home as national heroes.

=== 1970: Israel's debut at the World Cup ===
The 1970 AFC and OFC FIFA World Cup qualification were held together. Israel, New Zealand and Rhodesia received byes and advanced to the second round directly. The remaining three teams, Australia, Japan and South Korea, played against each other twice in South Korea. Australia advanced to the second round Group 1 and won over Rhodesia and advanced to the final round. In Group 2, Israel advanced to the final round when they defeated New Zealand twice. North Korea, despite their good performance in the previous tournament staged in England in 1966, refused to play in Israel and withdrew. In the final round, Israel defeated Australia 2–1 on aggregate and reached the World Cup. Israel qualified for their only World Cup to date as an Asian team. Soon after this, however, they left the Asian Football Confederation, and now compete in the European zone as they are now a member of UEFA. As of 2026, this is Israel's only World Cup finals appearance.

Israel lost their first game 0–2 against Uruguay, the other ended in a 1–1 draw against Sweden and 0–0 with Italy. Israel ranked last in the group and did not advance in the tournament. The team finished 13th out of 16 teams.

=== 1974: Another World Cup without Asian nations ===
The Asian and Oceania zone competed for one place in the World Cup. India, Sri Lanka and the Philippines withdrew before the matches were played. The remaining 15 teams were divided into two zones, based on geographical and political considerations. Zone A had 7 teams (teams from East Asia, plus Israel). All matches were played in the Republic of Korea. Zone B had 8 teams (teams from West Asia and Oceania, plus Indonesia and North Korea). South Korea won Zone A and Australia Zone B. In the final round, South Korea and Australia were tied 2–2 on aggregate, and a play-off on neutral ground in Hong Kong was played to decide the qualifier. Australia won this match through a Jimmy Mackay goal, scored off a free kick.

=== 1978: Iran's debut ===
A total of 21 AFC and OFC teams and Israel entered the competition. However, South Vietnam could not compete after being annexed by Vietnam. The Asian zone was allocated one place (out of 16) in the final tournament. The 21 teams would be divided into 5 groups. Sri Lanka, North Korea, Iraq and the United Arab Emirates withdrew. Hong Kong, South Korea, Iran, Kuwait and Australia won in their group. Iran won the final group and qualified for the FIFA World Cup for the first time.

The group consisted of Iran, Netherlands, Peru and Scotland. Iran, the reigning Asian champion, went out of the tournament winless. Iran lost two of their three group stage games: 0–3 against the Netherlands and 1–4 against Peru. However, they managed to draw 1–1 against Scotland with a late Iraj Danaeifard goal. The team finished 14th out of the 16 teams.

=== 1982: Kuwait's debut ===
A total of 21 AFC and OFC teams entered the qualification. Iran withdrew before the draw was made. The Asian and Oceania zone was allocated two places (out of 24) in the final tournament. The remaining 20 teams would be divided into four groups. New Zealand, Saudi Arabia, Kuwait and China PR advanced to the Final Round. In the Final Round, Kuwait ranked first place and immediately qualified to the World Cup. China PR and New Zealand finished level on points and goal difference, and a play-off on neutral ground (Singapore) was played to decide the qualifier. Kuwait won 2–1 and qualified to the World Cup for the first time.

Kuwait's group consisted of Czechoslovakia, England and France. In the opening match, Kuwait held Czechoslovakia to a 1–1 draw. In the game between Kuwait and France, with France leading 3–1, France midfielder Alain Giresse scored a goal vehemently contested by the Kuwait team, who had stopped play after hearing a piercing whistle from the stands, which they thought had come from Soviet referee Miroslav Stupar. Play had not yet resumed when Sheikh Fahid Al-Ahmad Al-Sabah, brother of the Kuwaiti Emir and president of the Kuwaiti Football Association, rushed onto the pitch to remonstrate with the referee. Stupar countermanded his initial decision and disallowed the goal to the fury of the French. Maxime Bossis scored another valid goal a few minutes later and France won 4–1. Kuwait lost the third game 0–1 against England. Kuwait finished fourth in their group and 21st out of the 24 teams.

=== 1986: Iraq's debut, South Korea's return ===
A total of 27 AFC teams entered the competition. The Asian zone was allocated two places (out of 24) in the final tournament. Teams were divided into two zones, based on geographical considerations. Zone A had 13 teams (teams from West Asia) and Zone B had 14 teams (teams from East Asia). Lebanon, Oman withdrew. Iran were disqualified. Iraq won Zone A Final Round, South Korea won Zone B. Iraq and South Korea qualified for the 1986 World Cup.

This was the last time Iraq qualified for the finals until 2026. Iraq lost all three games: 0–1 against Paraguay, 1–2 against Belgium and 0–1 against Mexico, and finished 23 out of the 24 teams. However the defeat to Paraguay was controversial, as Iraq's Ahmed Radhi had scored a header from a corner right at the end of the first half which the referee disallowed as he incorrectly blew the whistle for half-time just before the header went into the back of the net. The defeat to Belgium was also controversial as the referee gave a yellow card to Iraq's Basil Gorgis in a case of mistaken identity (the yellow was supposed to be given to Ghanim Oraibi) while the score was 0–2. Gorgis sarcastically applauded the referee's incorrect decision which led to him getting sent off and Iraq lost 1–2. South Korea qualified for the first time since 1954. In its first game, South Korea lost 1–3 against Argentina, in the second game drew Bulgaria 1–1 in a downpour and in the third lost 2–3 against Italy. South Korea finished 20 out of the 24 teams.

=== 1990: United Arab Emirates first World Cup ===
Twenty-six teams were in the running for these spots; Bahrain, India, Maldives and South Yemen withdrew without playing a qualifying match. The Maldives withdrew before the final draw, leaving 25 teams to be divided into six groups of four or five teams each. South Korea, United Arab Emirates, Qatar, China PR, Saudi Arabia and North Korea advanced to the Final Round. South Korea and the United Arab Emirates qualified for the 1990 World Cup, taking the first two places.

The United Arab Emirates qualified for the FIFA World Cup for the first time, its only appearance to date, but lost all three of its games: 2–0 to Colombia, 5–1 to West Germany and 4–1 to Yugoslavia. All three of the UAE's first round opponents reached the last 16. They were 24th (and last) place in the rankings. South Korea also lost all its three games: 0–2 to Belgium, 1–3 to Spain and 0–1 to Uruguay, and finished 22 out of 24 teams.

=== 1994: Saudi Arabia reaches the Round of 16 ===
A total of 30 teams entered the qualification. The Asian zone was allocated two places (out of 24) in the final tournament. The 30 teams were divided into six groups of five teams each, although Myanmar and Nepal withdrew after playing no match. The teams would play against each other twice. The group winners would advance to the Final Round. Iraq, Iran, North Korea, South Korea, Saudi Arabia and Japan advanced to the Final Round, with Saudi Arabia and South Korea taking the first two places in the World Cup.

Saudi Arabia qualified for the World Cup finals for the first time. Their group consisted of Belgium, Netherlands, Saudi Arabia and Morocco. Saudi Arabia lost its first game 1–2 against Netherlands, although they scored the first goal. Later, they beat Morocco 2–1. Against Belgium, Saudi player Saaed Al-Owairan ran from his own half through a maze of Belgian players to score the game's only goal. With three teams on an identical 6 points and an identical goal difference of +1, there was little to separate the top three, and all three qualified for the second round: but Netherlands and Saudi Arabia were ranked in the first two places (with guaranteed qualification) ahead of Belgium (in third place and having to rely on being one of the four best third-placed teams) on goals scored, with the Dutch further ranked ahead of the Saudis by virtue of having defeated them in the match between the sides. Saudi Arabia wrote history by become the first Asian team since North Korea (also a debutant at the time) in 1966 to reach the knockout stage. In the first knockout stage match, Saudi Arabia faced Sweden and lost 1–3 after two goals from Kennet Andersson and one from Martin Dahlin. They were 12th place in the rankings.

South Korea's World Cup began with two draws against Spain (2–2) and Bolivia (0–0). However they lost the decisive match 2–3 against title holders Germany, being 3-0 down after 20 minutes, pulling two goals back shortly after half-time but being unable to force an equalizer. They finished at 20th place in the rankings, and more importantly, lowest of the six third-placed teams, of which the top four qualified for the second round.

=== 1998: Four Asian nations at the World Cup ===
A total of 36 teams entered the competition. The Asian zone was allocated 3.5 places (out of 32) in the final tournament, with three qualifiers by right and a fourth to play off against the winners of the Oceania qualifying tournament. The 36 teams were reduced to 10 by preliminary qualifying matches, who were drawn into two groups of five. Saudi Arabia and South Korea qualified automatically as group winners for the 1998 World Cup. Japan and Iran, the two second-placed teams, played off in a single match at a neutral venue, Japan won 3-2 after extra time and qualified for the first time. Iran, fourth in the qualifying tournament after losing to Japan, had to play off against the winners of the Oceania tournament, which was Australia. In a two-legged tie played home and away, both matches were drawn, 1–1 in Iran and 2–2 in Australia, Iran qualifying by scoring more "away" goals after coming back from 2-0 down.

==== Saudi Arabia ====
Saudi Arabia were placed in Group C alongside South Africa, Denmark and hosts France. Saudi Arabia started with a 1–0 defeat by Denmark. Next, France scored four to eliminate Saudi Arabia. Saudi Arabia (0–2–0), which again failed to show any resemblance to the 1994 team that reached the second round, played most of the game with ten men after defender Mohammed Al-Khilaiwi was given a direct red card in the 19th minute for a poor tackle on Bixente Lizarazu. Forward Thierry Henry scored two goals, while David Trezeguet and Lizarazu scored one each for France. With two goals against Saudi Arabia, South Africa led but watched in horror as the Saudis scored on two penalty kicks to gain a 2–2 draw. The Saudis entered the match under new coach Mohammed al-Kharashi, a longtime assistant, after Brazilian Carlos Alberto Parreira was fired following the 4–0 loss to France.

==== Japan ====
Japan lost all three of its matches in its debut, however Japan demonstrated relatively good performance for a debutant, with all three losses were just minimal. In the first, it fell 1–0 to Argentina, with Gabriel Batistuta scoring for the opponents, knocking the ball over the Japanese goalkeeper on the edge of the penalty area. In the second match, against Croatia, a late Davor Šuker goal ensured a 1–0 Croatia victory and his nation's progression to the next round, simultaneously eliminating Japan from the tournament. Japan's World Cup campaign officially ended with an unexpected 2–1 defeat to rank outsiders Jamaica. Two goals from Theodore Whitmore gave Jamaica their first ever win in the World Cup finals, although Masashi Nakayama had the honour of scoring Japan's first-ever goal at the World Cup finals, which came in the 74th minute.

==== Iran ====
Iran's first game of Group F was played against Yugoslavia, a 1–0 loss instigated by a Siniša Mihajlović free-kick. Iran recorded their first World Cup victory in the second game, beating the United States 2–1, with Hamid Estili and Mehdi Mahdavikia scoring goals for Iran. The Iran–U.S. World Cup match was preheated with much excitement owing to each country's political stance after the Iranian Revolution. In an act of defiance against all forms of hatred or politics in sports, however, both sides presented one another with gifts and flowers and took ceremonial pictures before the match kickoff. Following the defeat by Iran, the U.S. were eliminated from the World Cup. Iran played Germany in the third game, where they lost 2–0. German goals were scored from Oliver Bierhoff and Jürgen Klinsmann. The one win and two defeats left Iran third in the final group standings, not enough for progression to the next round.

==== South Korea ====
South Korea entered the 1998 World Cup without a single win to their name despite 14 World Cup games' experience. South Korea played Mexico, the Netherlands and Belgium. In the first game, South Korea lead in the 27th minute thanks to a Ha Seok-ju free-kick that was deflected into the Mexican goal. A couple of minutes after the goal was scored, however, Ha Seok-ju was sent off for a bad challenge from behind, and Mexico leveled the score through half-time substitute Ricardo Peláez. With approximately 15 minutes remaining, Luis Hernández put Mexico in the lead with a simple tap-in. Hernández then went on to complete the victory after scoring Mexico's third goal. South Korea had to wait four more years to record their first ever victory in a World Cup: its next game against the Netherlands was a heavy 0–5 defeat, the third-worst loss in the nation's World Cup history. Its third game was against Belgium. A big win would have given Belgium a chance of progressing and an early goal by Luc Nilis might have set them on the way. The Koreans, however, mounted stiff resistance and in the second half, and Yoo Sang-chul scored the equaliser in an eventual 1–1 draw.

=== 2002: South Korea and Japan host the World Cup ===
South Korea and Japan were selected as hosts by FIFA on 31 May 1996. Initially, South Korea, Japan and Mexico presented three rival bids. However, the two Asian countries agreed to unite their bids shortly before the decision was made, and they were chosen unanimously in preference to Mexico. This was the first World Cup to be hosted by two or more countries. The 2002 World Cup was the tournament's 17th staging. It was also the first World Cup held in Asia, and the last in which the golden goal rule was utilized. South Korea and Japan, the co-hosts, qualified automatically, leaving 2.5 spots open for competition between 40 teams. Myanmar withdrew from the tournament after being placed in Group 2 but before any matches had been played, therefore reducing the group to three teams. Afghanistan, Bhutan, North Korea and Timor-Leste did not participate in the qualification process. Asia's two remaining automatic qualifying berths were taken by Saudi Arabia and China PR. Iran failed to become a third Asian representative in the World Cup after losing their AFC/UEFA playoff against the Republic of Ireland.

==== China PR ====
China PR qualified for the finals for the first time. Coached by Bora Milutinović (the fifth national team he coached in five consecutive World Cups), the nation failed to earn a point or even score a goal. As football is widely followed in China, national team success is considered to be a source of national pride. Around 300 million people tuned into broadcasts of China's 2002 World Cup matches, with a staggering 170 million new television sets being bought by citizens in order to watch their nation's first World Cup appearance. Its first game was against Costa Rica. Costa Rica dealt China PR a harsh blow by taking the lead against the run of play on 61 minutes. Rónald Gómez's slick backheel played Paulo Wanchope in, and Wu Chengying's challenge only popped the ball up for Gómez to fire in a left-foot shot. China PR had no time to gather their thoughts before they were 2–0 down. China's PR best moment of the first-half came on 39 minutes when they broke quickly after fending off a Costa Rica free-kick. Its second game against Brazil was a 0–4 defeat. China PR looked lively and appeared to be enjoying themselves, even when they overhit the ball, but China PR could not do anything about Roberto Carlos's left-footed free-kick goal in the 15th minute. Ronaldo then scored two and Ronaldinho one to effectively end the match. China PR searched for their first goal of the tournament in their third match, against Turkey. After just ten minutes, however, they were already down 0–2. Just before the half-hour mark, China PR almost scored their first goal of the tournament when Yang Chen hit the post. Hasan Şaş again set up Turkey with a cross to the far post, this time for Ümit Davala to score off the post. China PR failed to score a goal and was eliminated from the tournament.

==== South Korea ====
South Korea beat Poland 2–0 after Hwang Sun-hong and Yoo Sang-chul scored. The first real chance for the home side came in the 20th minute, when Yoo Sang-chul shot across the face of an outstretched Jerzy Dudek. South Korea started to apply more pressure and took the lead in the 25th minute: Lee Eul-yong played the ball into Hwang Sun-hong, who hit the ball first-time into the net. In the 53rd minute, South Korea scored their second goal: Yoo Sang-chul ran towards Tomasz Wałdoch and Radosław Kałużny, then confidently shot between them and past goalkeeper Dudek. Even the President of Korea waved his hat at the goal, which secured South Korea's first-ever win at the World Cup finals. In its second match, against the United States, the game's first real scoring chance fell to the U.S.' Clint Mathis, who scored with a left-footed drive from the middle of the penalty area. Later on, in the 78th minute, an Ahn Jung-hwan glancing header completely stunned American goalkeeper Brad Friedel, who seemed rooted to the spot as the ball sailed into the net. South Korea missed the chance to take all three points right at the end when Choi Yong-soo stabbed another shot over the bar, with only Friedel to beat. South Korea played its third match against Portugal, needing a win to be guaranteed a place in the second round, though earning one point would suffice (for the U.S. as well, however).

The South Koreans tore apart a Portuguese side who had João Pinto and Beto sent off. In the 70th minute, Park Ji-sung smashed in a brilliant goal for Korea to secure a 1–0 victory and Korea's progression to the next round. Here, South Korea beat Italy 2–1 in sudden-death extra time. In the 18th minute, Christian Vieri headed Italy into the lead from a Francesco Totti corner. Ahn Jung-hwan had the best chance for Korea in the 36th minute when he shot over the bar from close range. Two minutes from time, the stadium erupted as Italy defender Christian Panucci failed to clear the ball, with Seol Ki-hyun pouncing on his mistake. Totti received his second yellow card for diving in the penalty area. Ten-men Italy finally fell to a 117th-minute, golden goal header scored by Ahn Jung-hwan, who at the time was ironically playing for Italian club Perugia.

In the quarter-finals, Spain were unable to win a second consecutive penalty shoot-out, losing to South Korea after having two goals controversially disallowed in normal time, with South Korea becoming the first (and, as of 2018, the only) team from outside Europe and the Americas to reach the last four of a World Cup. Four minutes after the restart, a Spanish goal was disallowed, while a second Spanish goal was disallowed after the linesman judged that the ball had gone out of play before Fernando Morientes headed the ball into the net. In the 100th minute, Morientes turned on a long throw-in and crashed his shot against the left post. Korea won 5–3 on penalties and became the first ever Asian nation to reach the semi-finals of the World Cup, where they would face Germany.

The match started slowly: South Korea kept possession well and Germany appeared content to keep the volume of the crowd down, with both sides entering half-time level at 0–0. In the 75th minute, however, Michael Ballack ran on to Oliver Neuville's low cross; his shot was blocked by goalkeeper Lee Woon-jae, but Ballack followed up to convert the rebound and secure Germany's place in the final with a 1–0 victory. With the semi-final defeat, Korea contested the match for third place in Daegu against the other defeated semi-finalist, Turkey. Turkey, however, won third place after an entertaining 3–2 victory in a match that included the fastest ever World Cup goal, scored by Parma striker Hakan Şükür after just 11 seconds. Lee Eul-yong replied in the ninth minute with a curling free-kick into the top right-hand corner, but shortly after, İlhan Mansız put Turkey back in front in the 13th minute after splitting the South Korean defence by playing a swift one-two with Şükür. Song Chong-gug then managed to stun Turkey goalkeeper Rüştü Reçber when his long-range shot deflected off of Cha Du-ri's bottom, in injury time, for a last consolation goal that ended the game on a slight high note for the home fans.

==== Saudi Arabia ====
Saudi Arabia were eliminated as the worst team in tournament, after three defeats and no goals scored, including an 0–8 loss to Germany, 0–1 to Cameroon and 0–3 to the Republic of Ireland.

==== Japan ====
Hosts Japan topped their group with two wins and one draw. In the first match, they drew 2–2 with Belgium. Marc Wilmots broke the deadlock with a beautiful overhead kick in the 57th minute. Two minutes later, Japan's Takayuki Suzuki, in the penalty area, got a foot on to Shinji Ono's pass from the half-way line. In the 67th minute, Arsenal's Junichi Inamoto ran through three defenders to give Japan a 2–1 lead. Five minutes later, the stadium was momentarily silenced when Peter Van Der Heyden, beating the offside trap on the edge of the area, neatly lobbed Japan goalkeeper Seigo Narazaki as he came off his line. Japan advanced to the second round with a 1–0 win over Russia and a 2–0 victory against Tunisia. Japan register their first ever World Cup finals victory. However, they subsequently exited the tournament during the Round of 16 after a 1–0 defeat to Turkey. Ümit Davala headed Turkey into the lead from an Ergün Penbe's corner in the 12th minute. An Alessandro Santos free-kick crashed against the woodwork later on to give the Japanese some hope for the second-half. Japan made a couple of substitutions at half-time as they looked for fresh initiative. Hidetoshi Nakata deflected shot almost troubled Turkish goalkeeper Rüştü Reçber. Japan continued to look for the equaliser, with Akinori Nishizawa's header on target and Tomokazu Myojin shooting just narrowly wide. With ten minutes left in the game, Nishizawa's shot flew over the bar and with it Japan's hopes of a place in the quarter-finals.

=== 2006: Setback of Asia ===
Forty-four Asian teams are affiliated with FIFA, but Cambodia, Philippines, Bhutan and Brunei decided not to take part, while Myanmar was banned from the competition, so a total of 39 teams took part to compete for 4.5 places in the World Cup. Qualification matches reduced them to two 4-team groups. Saudi Arabia, South Korea, Japan and Iran as the top two in each group qualified for the 2006 World Cup finals. The two third-placed teams played off (Bahrain and Uzbekistan drew 1–1 over two legs, Bahrain progressing on the away goals rule) for the right to face the fourth-placed CONCACAF team, but the result of this was that Bahrain lost 2–1 to Trinidad & Tobago. The tournament was a disappointment for teams from Asia, as none of them managed to reach the knockout stage.

==== Iran ====
Iran returned to World Cup after missing the 2002 edition and started their campaign with high expectations from fans and media. Their first match was against Mexico in Group D. The game was level 1–1 at the half-time, but Iran lost at the end because of a defensive mistake, and the match finished 3–1, with goals scored by Omar Bravo and Zinha for Mexico and Yahya Golmohammadi for Iran. Iran then played Portugal in the second game, losing 2–0; goals were scored by Deco and Cristiano Ronaldo, the latter from a penalty. The two losses meant Iran was eliminated from the competition even before contesting their third and final game against Angola. Iran drew 1–1, with Sohrab Bakhtiarizadeh scoring the Iran goal to send Iran bottom of their group with only a point.

==== Japan ====
Japan also failed to advance to the Round of 16 after finishing the group without a win, losing to Australia 1–3 in the first match. In the 26th minute, Shunsuke Nakamura scored the first goal, only for Australia to respond with three late goals in the 84th, 89th and 92nd minutes. In game two, Japan drew with Croatia 0–0. After defeats in the opening game, both Japan and Croatia seemed reluctant to take any early risks and for 20 minutes, little appeared to transpire. In the 21st minute, however, Niko Kranjčar missed penalty, while five minutes into the second-half, the ball arrived at the far post only for Atsushi Yanagisawa to horrendously miss an open goal, skewing the ball back across the goalmouth. In Japan's third match, it lost to world's powerhouse Brazil 1–4, despite scoring the game's first goal, in the 34th minute, from Keiji Tamada, and finished bottom.

==== South Korea ====
South Korea won its first match 2–1, against Togo; goals were scored by Lee Chun-soo and Ahn Jung-hwan. The victory marked Korea's their first World Cup finals win outside of home soil. In the second game, a 1–1 draw with France, Thierry Henry scored in the ninth minute, but Park Ji-sung leveled the score in 80th minute. Before the last match, against Switzerland, South Korea had a strong chance to reach the round of 16, in which only a draw would ensure the Koreans into the knockout stage, in case of France fail to beat Togo. However, the match ended in a complete disappointment for South Korea: Switzerland scored first from a Philippe Senderos headed a goal off a Hakan Yakin free-kick in the 23rd minute. France went ahead against Togo in the 55th minute, and as South Korea struggled to find the net of Switzerland, the Swiss star striker, Alexander Frei, doubled Switzerland's lead with 13 minutes to play while France won their match, resulting in South Korea's elimination from the competition with total disbelief from fans.

==== Saudi Arabia ====
Saudi Arabia, like Iran and Japan, went out without a win and finished last. The Saudis drew the first match 2–2 with Tunisia; Saudi Arabia had the lead as late as the 93rd minute, but Radhi Jaidi leveled the score. The Saudis' next game was against Ukraine, ended in a complete 0–4 defeat. Saudi Arabia knew before kick-off that they had to score at least four goals to stand a chance of qualifying, but hope was small when their next opponent was Spain. Thus, survival was clearly priority number one as they allowed Spain, who had changed their entire first 11, to feel their way into the match. Juanito scored at the 39th minute and buried their chances of progression beyond the group stage.

=== 2010: South Korea and Japan reach the Round of 16, Australia's first WC in AFC and North Korea's return ===
Forty-three teams competed for spots at the 2010 World Cup; Laos, Brunei and the Philippines did not enter qualification. This was the first time Timor-Leste competed in World Cup qualification and the first time Australia attempted to qualify as a member of the AFC, having moved from the Oceania Football Confederation at the start of 2006. Asia's four automatic qualifying berths were taken by Australia, Japan, North Korea and South Korea, collectively filling the top two places in two five-team groups. The two third-played teams, Bahrain and Saudi Arabia, played off for fifth place and the right to face an intercontinental playoff, against the winners of the Oceania qualifying group: and for the second World Cup in a row, Bahrain won the fifth-place Asian playoff on away goals, but lost the intercontinental playoff - this time to New Zealand.

==== North Korea ====
North Korea qualified for the first time since 1966; they were drawn into Group G, and played their first match against five-time winners Brazil on 15 June. Brazil won 2–1 in a game where North Korea were well organised defensively and showed resilience, frustrating the Brazilians. Despite their best efforts, however, they were nevertheless outmatched and eventually broken down. Maicon's relief was visible after his goal to finally put Brazil ahead. Their next game was against Portugal on 21 June, where they suffered a heavy 0–7 defeat. Despite starting well (much like against the Brazilians), with a defensive, well organised approach, once Portugal scored the first, the North Korean defense unfolded and the following six goals were scored with relative ease. In North Korea's last match, against the Ivory Coast on 25 June, the team fell 3–0. After losing all three matches in the group stages, North Korea were eliminated, finishing last in Group G with no point.

==== South Korea ====
South Korea were drawn into Group B alongside Argentina, Nigeria and Greece. South Korea registered the first win at the 2010 World Cup with a 2–0 victory over Greece, with goals scored by Lee Jung-soo and captain Park Ji-sung. In the second match, South Korea fell to Argentina 1–4, with striker Gonzalo Higuaín scoring a hat-trick and Park Chu-young scoring an own goal for the Argentines; Lee Chung-yong scored Korea's consolation goal. South Korea coach Huh Jung-moo, who played against Argentina's Diego Maradona at the 1986 World Cup, saw his team struggle to live with Argentina's quick tempo and the quality of their pass-and-move football. The decisive match was with Nigeria, which ended 2–2 and with subsequent triumph for South Korea, because paired with Argentina's defeat of Greece, the draw sealed their first-ever progression beyond the group stage on foreign soil.

As Group B runners-up, South Korea faced Uruguay in the last 16. The South Koreans were effervescent in their attacking third but shaky in their defence, which was exposed as early as the eighth minute: Diego Forlán was fed on the left and played a low ball across the six-yard area, which was misjudged by goalkeeper Jung Sung-ryong and his statuesque defence but not by Luis Suárez at the far post, who calmly slotted in for his second goal of the competition. In the 68th minute, the South Koreans' luck change when, off of a free-kick, Bolton's Lee Chung-yong pounced on Mauricio Victorino's attempted headed clearance to score a nod-in from eight yards out; it was the first goal Uruguay had conceded in the tournament. With ten minutes remaining, Suárez lurked on the fringes of the 18-yard area as a corner was swung in from the right. He cut in from the left before curling in a well-struck shot that left goalkeeper Jung Sung-ryong rooted as the ball clipped the post on its way in. The South Koreans pressed and should have taken the game into extra-time, but substitute Lee Dong-gook's weak shot squirmed under the shirt of Fernando Muslera before it was comfortably cleared.

==== Australia ====
Australia were drawn into Group D, which also featured three-time world champion Germany, Ghana and Serbia. On 14 June, Australia faced Germany in Durban; Pim Verbeek surprisingly chose to play without a recognised striker. Australia were comprehensively defeated 4–0, and Verbeek was heavily criticised for his tactics, with chief SBS Football Analyst Craig Foster calling for his immediate sacking.

Australia's second group match, against Ghana, resulted in a 1–1 draw. Australia shot its only goal early in the first half by Brett Holman after Ghana's goalkeeper Richard Kingson fumbled the ball following a Mark Bresciano free-kick. Shortly after, a goal-bound strike from Ghana's Jonathan Mensah was blocked on the goal line by Harry Kewell's upper arm, resulting in a penalty kick and a straight red card for Kewell. Ghanaian striker Asamoah Gyan scored the equalizing goal. Despite the man advantage, however, Ghana were mostly limited to long-range shots on Australia's goal, and some desperate defending from Australia saw the game finish a draw.

In their final group match, against Serbia, Tim Cahill was back from suspension and scored via a header in the second half to give Australia a 1–0 lead. Only four minutes later, Brett Holman doubled the scoreline with an impressive long-range effort. Late in the second half, Serbia managed to score a late goal through Marko Pantelić after Australian goalkeeper Mark Schwarzer fumbled the ball, with the game ultimately ending at 2–1. Germany had defeated Ghana 1–0, which meant that both Australia and Ghana finished on four points. Ghana, however, progressed to the knockout stage due to their superior goal difference. Verbeek completed his term as Australian coach at the end of the 2010 World Cup.

==== Japan ====
Japan hung on to win their first-ever World Cup match on foreign soil, defeating Cameroon 1–0. The game's only goal came in the 39th minute when Keisuke Honda controlled a cross at the far post and stabbed the ball past goalkeeper Souleymanou Hamidou. In the second game, Japan lost 0–1 to the Netherlands. Wesley Sneijder's powerful 52nd-minute winner from just outside the box settled a fascinating Group E contest between two contrasting sides who opened up in the second half and were creating good chances right up to the final whistle. Loitering just outside the penalty area, Sneijder lashed a powerful right-foot shot towards goal that goalkeeper Eiji Kawashima could only deflect into the net despite being well-placed to make the save. Japan had the best chance to level the score one minute from time, but unmarked substitute Shinji Okazaki fired over the net from ten yards out.

Japan's third, decisive match was against Denmark. Midfielder Keisuke Honda opened the scoreline, bending a 30-yard free-kick past Danish goalkeeper Thomas Sørensen in the 17th minute. Just 13 minutes later, teammate Yasuhito Endō fired past Sørensen's outstretched hand to make it 2–0 for Japan. Takeshi Okada's side had to survive a late scare as Jon Dahl Tomasson tapped in a rebound after goalkeeper Kawashima saved the Dane's penalty kick. However, substitute Shinji Okazaki's 88th-minute strike clinched second place in the group for Japan with a 3–1 victory.

Japan faced Paraguay in the last 16. The match was decided by a penalty shoot-out after the score was locked at 0–0 for 120 minutes. Paraguay won the shoot-out and progressed to its first ever World Cup quarter-final. The match was a generally unexciting affair, as Japan adopted a defensive posture while Paraguay itself maintained a solid defence. The first-half produced the occasional chance on goal, with Lucas Barrios having a shot saved shortly before a long-distance shot from Daisuke Matsui hit the crossbar of Paraguay's goal. The second half was similar, with both sides producing occasional chances to score rather than periods of outright dominance. The result of the deadlock was extra time, which continued goalless. A penalty shoot-out ensued, during which Yuichi Komano missed a spot kick for Japan. Paraguay scored all five of its penalties, clinching the win and subsequent progression to the quarter-finals.

=== 2014: Disappointment for the Asians ===
The 2014 FIFA World Cup, held in Brazil, marked the first time since 1990 where no Asian team managed to win a game, and where the AFC was the only FIFA confederation without both wins and teams represented in the knockout stages. Three of Asia's four qualifiers in 2010—Australia, Japan and South Korea—qualified for the 2014 tournament. Iran, meanwhile, qualified for the first time since 2006. Jordan and Uzbekistan played off for fifth-place (again as third-best teams from two groups), Jordan winning 9–8 on penalties after a 2–2 draw, but losing a subsequent intercontinental playoff - this time against CONMEBOL's fifth team, Uruguay.

Australia was eliminated early despite good performances against Chile and the Netherlands that both ended in close losses (1–3 and 2–3 respectively). In their third match, however, they were blown-out 3–0 to defending World Cup champions Spain, who were themselves also mathematically eliminated from the tournament. The Australian performance however, received praise from public fans for their determination in face of difficulties of their group, thus spared Australia from criticism unlike the rest of Asian teams.

Japan opened the scoring in its first match against the Ivory Coast, but lost the lead en route to an eventual 1–2 defeat. In the following games, the Japanese failed to break Greece's tight defence and finished in a goalless draw even when Greece had only 10 men, and afterwards, despite equalizing Colombia at half-time, eventually lost 4–1 to ensure an early tournament exit.

South Korea opened the score against Russia after a blunder by goalkeeper Igor Akinfeev, but wound up conceding the equalizing goal shortly after. A high-scoring match with Algeria had the Koreans defeated 4–2, and a 1–0 loss to Belgium ended South Korea's campaign.

After an opening 0–0 draw with Nigeria, the Iranian defense held Argentina goalless for most of the match before a Lionel Messi goal in injury time. Needing to beat the already-eliminated Bosnia and Herzegovina to clinch the group's second spot in the knockout stages, Iran wound up defeated 3–1 and lost the chance to qualify.

=== 2018: Five Asian teams at FIFA World Cup ===
The 2018 FIFA World Cup, held in Russia, marked the first time five Asian teams qualified for the final tournament. 46 teams were whittled down to two groups of 6, with the now-usual format of two automatic qualifiers from both groups, plus a play-off between the third-placed teams for fifth place who would face a further intercontinental playoff. Iran, South Korea (from Group A), Japan and Saudi Arabia (from Group B) formed the four automatic qualifiers: Australia played off against Syria for fifth place, won it 3–2 in extra time over two legs, and played off against the fourth CONCACAF team. Australia's 3–1 victory over Honduras over two legs thus made the fifth AFC qualifier.

Only Japan advanced past the group stage, a feat aided by fair-play points in tie-breaking (after being level on points, goal-difference and goals scored), at the expense of Senegal with whom they drew 2–2 in the group stages: Japan also defeated Colombia 2–1 and lost to Poland 1–0. This was the first time that fair-play had been used as a tie-breaker in a World Cup group stage. Aside from Australia, who only got a draw and two defeats, the other three had at least one win: Saudi Arabia secured a 2–1 comeback victory over Egypt, Iran defeated Morocco, and in the biggest upset, South Korea beat the defending champions Germany. In the round of 16, Japan surprised a favoured Belgium and earned a 2–0 lead, only to suffer a 3–2 comeback, with the two goals scored by Belgium from Jan Vertonghen and Marouane Fellaini. The match ended with a Belgian goal by Nacer Chadli in the last minute of stoppage time.

=== 2022: Three out of six Asian teams reach the second round for the first time ===
The 2022 FIFA World Cup was held in Qatar – the first time a single nation from the Asian federation had hosted it, after the joint hosting of Japan/South Korea in 2002: also the first time since the World Cup's earliest days, that a nation made their inaugural appearance as hosts without having previously qualified. Qatar thus being granted automatic qualification as hosts, Asia still retained their regular 4.5 qualifiers (4 automatic, 1 to go forward to an intercontinental playoff – this time the 5th Asian was drawn against the 5th CONMEBOL team). 46 nations entered. The first two rounds of qualification (the 12 lowest ranked teams playing off in the first round, to allow 6 to go through to the second stage and join the other 34) were combined with the qualification stages for the 2023 AFC Asian Cup, thus Qatar played in the second round but did not need to play in the subsequent stages. Qatar nevertheless won their second-round group: eight groups of five saw 12 qualifiers (7 group winners minus Qatar, and 5 second-place teams) sorted into a third round, of two groups of six. The second and third rounds in question was disrupted by the COVID-19 pandemic, many matches being delayed or rearranged, and North Korea withdrew outright after having played five of their eight matches. Asia's World Cup qualifiers from the competition were the same teams as in 2018: once again Iran and South Korea topped Group A, while Saudi Arabia and Japan headed Group B. Australia once again qualified as Asia's fifth team, by winning the playoff of the third-placed teams (2–1 against the UAE) followed by the intercontinental playoff (5–4 on penalties following a 0–0 draw against Peru): both matches having to be reduced to single matches rather than two-leg home-and-away affairs, played at a neutral venue – in Qatar itself – only a few months before the World Cup, thanks to pandemic-related delays. Australia's victory meant that five Asian teams joined Qatar to make six Asian teams in the World Cup for the first time, of whom three were to get through the group stage to the second round. Following the end of the group stage in the first FIFA World Cup in a West Asian nation, by irony, the most successful Asian sides in this edition, were entirely made up of East Asian nations.

==== Qatar ====
The hosts, drawn in a group with Ecuador, Senegal and the Netherlands, lost all three of their games. Ecuador beat them 2–0 in the opening match, a third goal being disallowed for offside by video assistance: Qatar scored their first and, as it turned out, only goal in a 3–1 defeat to Senegal: and then finally were defeated 2–0 by the Dutch, becoming the first tournament hosts to lose all their games at the World Cup. They were also the only Asian team to fail to win at least one match in this World Cup.

==== Iran ====
Iran, the highest ranked team from Asia at the time, arrived to the World Cup in Qatar with political turmoil at home and were hammered 6–2 by England in the first match in the group stage, but two injury-time goals to defeat Wales 2–0 gave Iran first-ever World Cup win against a European opposition, and meant that their fate was still in their own hands by the time of their third match against the USA. However, the USA scored a first-half goal to take second place in the group and send Iran home.

==== Saudi Arabia ====
Saudi Arabia came from behind to score a shock 2–1 win against Argentina with two goals from Saleh Al-Shehri and Salem Al-Dawsari, one of the tournament's perennial favourites, to give Asia's first ever win in the 2022 World Cup, which was described as one of the greatest football upsets in World Cup history. However, a sobering 2–0 defeat to Poland in the next match despite Saudi domination, which included a missed penalty from Salem Al-Dawsari, saw them needing to defeat a desperate Mexico in the third match to qualify. Instead, Mexico butchered the Saudis and put those hopes to bed in the second half by taking a 2–0 lead, two narrow offside decisions preventing a third goal; a Saudi goal in injury-time by Salem Al-Dawsari to pull the score back to 2–1 served only as consolation (and to ensure that Poland's qualification ahead of Mexico was on goal-difference rather than fair-play, little separating the two sides), the Saudis ultimately finishing at the bottom of the group, putting an end to West Asian involvement in the World Cup. Because of defeat to Mexico as well, Saudi Arabia suffered a 32 years knockout stage drought, standing second as a record for the longest knockout stage drought among Asian teams, after North Korea.

==== Australia ====
Australia opened the scoring against France, but slumped to a 4–1 defeat after the French rallied under Mbappe. However, a shock 1–0 victory against group dark horse Tunisia in the second match with a header from Mitch Duke gave them a chance to qualify by winning or possibly even drawing the third match against Denmark. A goal for Leckie halfway through the second half gave Australia the victory, and Australia finished the group in second place (on goal difference behind France, following Tunisia's surprise victory over the French which would have seen them progress at Australia's expense if Denmark had managed to equalize) and qualified for the second round for the second time in their history and for the first time as an AFC member, where they would face Argentina. The victory over Denmark marked the first time Australia had kept two clean sheets in succession at the World Cup, or kept a clean sheet against any European side, and the first time they had won two matches in a single World Cup. Against Argentina, though, their luck ran out: goals from Messi in the first half, and Alvarez in the second, gave Argentina a 2–0 lead. Australia pulled a goal back, thanks to an own goal by Fernandez from a deflected shot by Goodwin, and came perilously close to an injury-time equalizer, but Kuol's shot was saved by Martinez, Argentina winning 2–1 in the end, putting an end to Australia's most successful World Cup run.

==== Japan ====
Japan, 1–0 down at half-time, came back to beat Germany 2–1 to give Asia's second World Cup win and the biggest shock after Saudi Arabia's win over Argentina. They dominated possession and territory against Costa Rica in their second match, but it was Costa Rica scored a late goal and went away with a 1–0 win, leaving Japan needing at least a point against Spain. At half-time, again 1–0 down and with Spain having the majority of possession and territory, it appeared that Japan were down and out, especially with Germany seemingly dominant against Costa Rica despite having only one goal to show for it. However Japan turned it around in the second half, and scored two goals – the second including a potentially controversial VAR decision over whether the ball had previously gone out of play: most video angles showed the ball grounded on the wrong side of the line, but one crucial camera angle showed part of its curvature overhanging the edge of the line and thus still in play. Spain were unable to equalize, and Japan thus overtook them to top the group – ahead of Spain, who finished in second place ahead of Germany on goal difference, in what would be the greatest achievement in Japanese football history for beating two former world champions in a difficult group. Japan would go on to face Croatia in the second round: Maeda gave them the lead just before half-time, but Perisic equalized for Croatia shortly afterwards. Both teams tired in the second half, and a scrappy extra-time period produced few chances as the game went to a penalty shoot-out. Croatia's keeper Livakovic was the hero, saving three of Japan's penalties, Croatia winning the shoot-out 3–1 after four penalties for each side.

==== South Korea ====
South Korea drew their first match 0–0 against Uruguay. In the second, against Ghana, they were 2–0 down at half-time: they pulled both goals back, only to concede a third shortly later, and were unable to force an equalizer, losing 3–2, leaving them needing to beat already-qualified Portugal in their third match and hope the other result was favourable. Although this seemed a difficult task, South Korea came back from a goal down to beat Portugal 2–1, and since Uruguay only beat Ghana 2–0 (the same margin by which they had lost to Portugal), South Korea were level with them on goal difference and ahead on goals scored, and went forward to join Japan and Australia in the last sixteen to meet Brazil, the first time three teams from Asia had qualified for the knockout stage. The Koreans, however, were totally outclassed by Brazil, 4-0 down after barely half an hour, and it could have been even more before half-time but several clear chances were wasted. In the second half Brazil noticeably eased up, and scored no more, in fact the Koreans pulled a late goal back, but 4-1 marked the end of Korea's and Asia's participation in 2022.

=== 2026: Record nine Asian teams at FIFA World Cup ===
With the expansion to 48 teams, eight qualification berths were guaranteed for Asian nations at the 2026 FIFA World Cup held at Canada, Mexico and the United States, while another contested an intercontinental playoff. The qualifiers resulted in the return of the six from 2022 plus the debuts of Jordan and Uzbekistan, while the intercontinental playoff enabled Iraq to qualify for its second World Cup after 40 years.

Japan and Australia advanced past the group stage, the former with one win and two draws, and the latter with one win, one draw and one defeat. South Korea won its first game against Czechia, but lost the following two. Iran drew all three games, with their game against Egypt having a possible victory goal overturned, and the following day were disqualified of the possibility to move on as one of the best third-placed teams. Qatar managed to tie with Switzerland in the closing minutes of their opening match, but followed that with two blowout defeats, 0–6 to co-hosts Canada and 1–3 to Bosnia and Herzegovina. Saudi Arabia lost to Spain in-between draws against Uruguay and Cape Verde. Iraq, Jordan and Uzbekistan lost all their matches.

The new Round of 32 had both AFC teams eliminated right away. Japan opened the score against Brazil, but suffered two comeback goals during the second half. Australia managed to get a 1–1 against Egypt and were subsequently eliminated in the penalty shoot-outs.

== Notable players ==
In 2020, the AFC selected five World Cup heroes and invited three experts Philippe Troussier, Afshin Ghotbi and Steve Darby to decide the best player among them, as well as taking a poll of fans, which would be responsible for 25 percent of overall points. It also announced two versions of all-time XI at the World Cup on the basis of fans' vote and Opta's statistics.

Best player of all time
Rank	Player	Experts' pick	Fans' pick
1st	(South Korea) Park Ji-sung	1st	4th
2nd	(Australia) Tim Cahill	2nd	5th
3rd	(Saudi Arabia) Sami Al-Jaber	3rd	3rd
4th	(Iran) Alireza Beiranvand	5th	1st
4th	(Japan) Keisuke Honda	4th	2nd

All-time XI
Position	Fans' pick	Opta's pick
Goalkeeper	(Saudi Arabia) Mohamed Al-Deayea	(South Korea) Lee Woon-jae
Defenders	(South Korea) Lee Young-pyo	(South Korea) Song Chong-gug
Defenders	(South Korea) Hong Myung-bo	(South Korea) Hong Myung-bo
Defenders	(Saudi Arabia) Abdullah Zubromawi	(South Korea) Kim Tae-young
Defenders	(Japan) Yuto Nagatomo	(Japan) Yuto Nagatomo
Midfielders	(South Korea) Park Ji-sung	(South Korea) Park Ji-sung
Midfielders	(Saudi Arabia) Fuad Anwar	(Australia) Mile Jedinak
Midfielders	(Japan) Hidetoshi Nakata	(Japan) Hidetoshi Nakata
Midfielders	(Japan) Keisuke Honda	(Japan) Keisuke Honda
Forwards	(Saudi Arabia) Sami Al-Jaber	(Australia) Tim Cahill
Forwards	(South Korea) Son Heung-min	(South Korea) Son Heung-min
