= Van Beusekom =

Van Beusekom is a Dutch surname. Notable people with the surname include:

- Joke van Beusekom (born 1952), Dutch badminton player
- Willem van Beusekom (1947–2006), Dutch broadcaster and television presenter

== See also ==
- Leen van Beuzekom, Indonesian footballer
