= AC Ajaccio =

Football club in Ajaccio, Corsica, France

Ajaccio
- Full name: Athletic Club Ajaccien
- Nickname: L'ours (The Bear)
- Founded: 1910; 116 years ago
- Ground: Stade Michel Moretti
- Capacity: 10,446
- Owner: Holding Ajaccio Imperial Corse Investissement
- President: Michaël Torre
- Manager: Anthony Lippini
- League: Régional 1 Corsica
- 2025–26: Régional 2 Corsica, 1st of 12 (promoted)
- Website: www.ac-ajaccio.corsica
Home colours	Away colours

Athletic Club Ajaccien (Corsican: Athletic Club Aiaccini), commonly referred to as AC Ajaccio, ACA or simply Ajaccio (French pronunciation: [aʒaksjo]) is a French football club based in the city of Ajaccio on the island of Corsica. They compete in the Régional 1, the sixth tier of French football.

The club was founded in 1910. They play their home matches at the Stade Michel Moretti and are rivals with fellow Corsican club Bastia, with whom they contest the Corsica derby (Derby Corse).

== History ==
Depending on sources, it is agreed that Ajaccio began playing in 1909–10. Their adopted colors are red and white stripes. Though they used to play in what was previously utilised as a sand dump, they decided to move to another, cleaner, safer stadium upon the insistence of Jean Lluis, father-in-law of club president Louis Baretti. The new stadium that was chosen held 5,000 spectators and was in use until 1969.

AC Ajaccio were elected Corsican champions on eight occasions, in 1920, 1921, 1934, 1939, 1948, 1950, 1955 and 1964, and are one of three big "island" teams, along with Gazélec Ajaccio and Bastia, the competition between the three being kept no secret. Spectators during the 1946 Corsican Cup final, held between A.C.A. and Sporting Bastia, were handed umbrellas to shield themselves from the violence. Upon refusal of a penalty which would have been awarded to ACA, violence erupted between the fans, who used umbrellas both to cause and shield themselves from violence. This final was abandoned and replayed much later.

A.C.A. became a professional team in 1965 thanks to the ambitious efforts of the club's leaders. They initially adopted the symbol of the polar bear, but this has since been dropped in favour of a more stylised logo that uses a part of the Corsican flag. They brought back the polar bear in 2014.

In 1967, the team became the first Corsican club to play in France's top division. Prior to the 2022–23 season, they were most recently in Ligue 1 in the 2013–14 season, when they were relegated after finishing in last place, following a spell of three seasons in the top flight; the drop was confirmed with defeat at neighbours Bastia.

=== Takeover by the FLNC-Canal Habituel ===
AC Ajaccio, alongside rival club SC Bastia, played a pivotal role in the early period of the "Years of Lead", a period of intense infighting in the 1990s during the Corsican conflict. The FLNC-Canal Habituel, the island's second largest guerrilla group at the time behind the rival FLNC-Canal Historique, looking to expand their influence in their stronghold city of Ajaccio, secured the entire management team of AC Ajaccio. Alain Orsoni, Michel Moretti, and Antoine Antona became the club's figureheads; all three were high-ranking members of the FLNC-Canal Habituel (in fact, Orsoni was its leader). This group of Habituels continued to manage AC Ajaccio well after the dissolution of the FLNC-Canal Habituel in 1997. Moretti, who had been president since this acquisition, gave his position to Orsoni in July 2008. Orsoni led the group until 2015, and returned to the role of president briefly in 2022.

=== Recent history ===
On 4 July 2011, Ajaccio signed Mexican goalkeeper Guillermo Ochoa, who would make an impact on the club by being part of their historic XI, and would later be recognized as the greatest player ever to play for Ajaccio.

In November 2014, Olivier Pantaloni returned for a third spell as manager. His team came third in 2017–18, qualifying for the play-offs, where they beat Le Havre in a semi-final marred by violence on and off the pitch, before losing the final to Toulouse. The club were denied promotion in 2019–20 when the season was curtailed with ten games remaining due to the coronavirus pandemic; Ajaccio were one point off the top two, who were the only ones to go up as the play-offs could not be contested. In the 2021–22 Ligue 2 season, Ajaccio were promoted back to Ligue 1 after finishing second. However, with three games in hand, the club were relegated directly back down.

On 27 June 2024, Ajaccio was administratively relegated to the Championnat National by the Direction Nationale du Contrôle de Gestion (DNCG) due to financial issues. They appealed the decision, and on the 11th of July 2024, they were reinstated in Ligue 2 for the 2024–25 season. On 24 June 2025, the club was once again provisionally relegated to the Championnat National. On 16 July 2025, their administrative relegation was confirmed, and Boulogne was promoted to Ligue 2. On 14 August 2025, due to continuing financial issues, Ajaccio was excluded from any national-level competitions for 2025–26 season altogether. On 5 September 2025, Ajaccio was confirmed as being placed in the Régional 2, the seventh tier of French football, for the season.

In April 2026, Ajaccio secured promotion from the Régional 2 to the Régional 1.

== Coaches ==
- Jean Pietri (pre–1955)
- Félix Pironti (1955–57)
- Michel Brusseaux (1957–58)
- Jean Laune (1958–59)
- Jean-Pierre Knayer (1959–63)
- Mohamed Azzouz (1963–64)
- Ernst Stojaspal (1964–65)
- Alberto Muro (1965–70)
- Louis Hon (1970–71)
- Antoine Cuissard (1971–72)
- André Mori (1972–73)
- Louis Hon (1973–74)
- Lulu Accorsi (1974–75)
- Alain Mistre (1975–76)
- François Paoli (1976–78)
- Mohamed Azzouz (1978–79)
- Unknown (1979–92)
- Baptiste Gentili (1 July 1992 – 30 June 2001)
- Rolland Courbis (1 July 2001 – 30 June 2003)
- Dominique Bijotat (1 July 2002 – 21 September 2004)
- Olivier Pantaloni (2004)
- Rolland Courbis (8 February 2005 – 11 January 2006)
- Olivier Pantaloni (interim) (11 January 2006 – 12 January 2006)
- José Pasqualetti (12 January 2006 – 30 June 2006)
- Ruud Krol (1 July 2006 – 30 June 2007)
- Gernot Rohr (1 July 2007 – 30 August 2008)
- José Pasqualetti (1 September 2008 – 23 February 2009)
- Olivier Pantaloni (23 February 2009 – 13 June 2012)
- Alex Dupont (22 June 2012 – 17 December 2012)
- Albert Emon (21 December 2012 – 28 May 2013)
- Fabrizio Ravanelli (7 June 2013 – 2 November 2013)
- Christian Bracconi (interim) (3 November 2013 – 14 October)
- Thierry Debès (interim) (October 2014)
- Olivier Pantaloni (6 November 2014– 24 June 2024)
- Mathieu Chabert (2 July 2024– 3 January 2025)
- Thierry Debès (3 January 2025– 18 August 2025)
- Anthony Lippini (9 September 2025– present)

== Honours ==
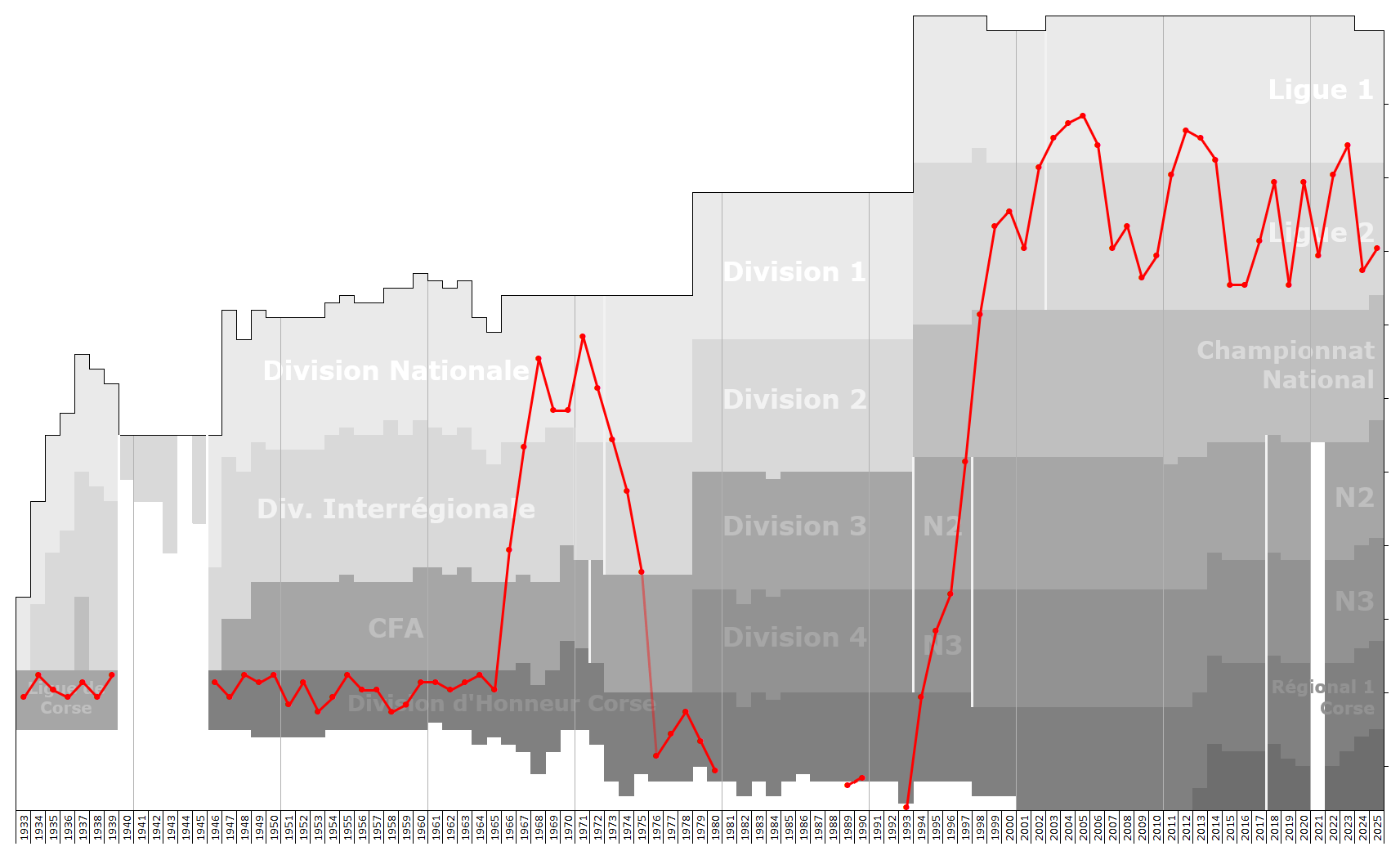
Historical league performance chart of AC Ajaccio

- Ligue 2
  - Champions (2): 1966–67, 2001–02
- Ligue 3
  - Champions (1): 1997–98
- Régional 1 Corsica
  - Champions (11): 1920, 1921, 1934, 1939, 1948, 1950, 1955, 1964, 1994, 2008, 2011
- Régional 2 Corsica
  - Champions (1): 2026
- Michel Moretti Challenge
  - Champions (3): 2009, 2010, 2012
