= Mihály Bíró =

Hungarian footballer

Personal information
- Full name: Mihály Bíró
- Date of birth: 27 September 1919
- Place of birth: Budapest, Hungary
- Date of death: June 1970 (aged 50)
- Position: Forward

Senior career*
Years	Team	Apps	(Gls)
1937-1940	Ferencvárosi TC	26	(7)
Medal record
Representing Hungary
FIFA World Cup
Runner-up	1938 France
- * Club domestic league appearances and goals

Mihály Bíró (27 September 1919 in Budapest - June 1970) was a Hungarian football forward who was a member of the Hungary national team at the 1938 FIFA World Cup. However, he was never capped for the national team. He also played for Ferencvárosi TC. His nickname was "Dani".
