= Josef Orth =

Czech footballer (born 1914)

Personal information
- Date of birth: 1914
- Position: Defender

Senior career*
Years	Team	Apps	(Gls)
- ŠK Slovan Bratislava
- * Club domestic league appearances and goals

Josef Orth (born 1914, date of death unknown) was a Czech football defender who was a member of the Czechoslovakia national team at the 1938 FIFA World Cup. However, he never earned a cap for the national team. He also played for ŠK Slovan Bratislava. Orth is deceased.
