= Pierre Dalem =

Belgian footballer

Personal information
- Full name: Pierre Antoine Henri Joseph Dalem
- Date of birth: 16 March 1912
- Place of birth: Liège (Belgium)
- Date of death: 22 February 1993 (aged 80)
- Position: Midfielder

Senior career*
Years	Team	Apps	(Gls)
1931–1939	Standard de Liège		

International career
1935–1939	Belgium	23	(0)
- * Club domestic league appearances and goals

Pierre Antoine Henri Joseph Dalem (born 16 March 1912 in Liège; died 22 February 1993) was a Belgian footballer.

== Career ==
A midfielder for Standard de Liège, Dalem played 162 matches and scored 5 goals in the Belgian First Division. He was a Belgian international from 1935 to 1939, and played 23 matches for the Diables Rouges.

== Honours ==
- International from 1935 to 1939 (23 caps)
- Picked for the 1938 World Cup (did not play)
- Belgian runners-up in 1936 with Standard de Liège
