= René Pijpers =

Dutch footballer (1917–1944)

Personal information
- Date of birth: 15 September 1917
- Place of birth: Swalmen, Netherlands
- Date of death: 22 March 1944 (aged 26)
- Place of death: Swalmen, Netherlands
- Position: Midfielder

Senior career*
Years	Team	Apps	(Gls)
- DOSKO
- RFC Roermond
- * Club domestic league appearances and goals

René Antoine Pijpers (15 September 1917 – 22 March 1944) was a Dutch football midfielder who was a member of the Netherlands' squad at the 1938 FIFA World Cup. However, he never made an appearance for the national team. With RFC Roermond he won the KNVB Cup in 1936 alongside his brothers Frans, Harry and Coen.
