= Sven Unger =

Swedish footballer

Personal information
- Date of birth: 1909
- Place of birth: Sweden
- Date of death: 2001 (aged 91–92)
- Position: Forward

Senior career*
Years	Team	Apps	(Gls)
- IK Sleipner

International career
- Sweden
- * Club domestic league appearances and goals

Sven Unger was a Swedish football forward who played for Sweden. He also played for IK Sleipner.
