= Otakar Nožíř =

Czech footballer

Personal information
- Date of birth: 12 March 1917
- Place of birth: Ledeč nad Sázavou, Bohemia, Austria-Hungary
- Date of death: 2 September 2006 (aged 89)
- Place of death: Olomouc, Czech Republic
- Position: Midfielder

Senior career*
Years	Team	Apps	(Gls)
1936–1941	SK Slavia Praha		
1941–1944	SK Olomouc ASO		
1944	SK Slavia Praha		
1945–1947	SK Olomouc ASO		

International career
1946	Czechoslovakia	2	(0)
- * Club domestic league appearances and goals

Otakar Nožíř (12 March 1917 in Ledeč nad Sázavou – 2 September 2006 in Olomouc) was a Czech football midfielder who played for Czechoslovakia in the 1938 FIFA World Cup. He also played for Slavia Praha.
