= Tan See Han =

Indonesian footballer

Personal information
- Date of birth: 1910
- Place of birth: Dutch East Indies
- Position: Striker

Senior career*
Years	Team	Apps	(Gls)
- Tiong Hoa Soerabaja

International career
- Dutch East Indies
- * Club domestic league appearances and goals

Tan See Han (born 1910, date of death unknown) was an Indonesian football forward who played for the Dutch East Indies in the 1938 FIFA World Cup. He also played for Tiong Hoa Soerabaja. Tan is deceased.
