= Rudi Telwe =

Indonesian footballer

Personal information
- Place of birth: Dutch East Indies
- Position: Forward

Senior career*
Years	Team	Apps	(Gls)
- HBS Soerabaja

International career
- Dutch East Indies
- * Club domestic league appearances and goals

Rudi Telwe (date of birth and death unknowns) was an Indonesian football forward who played for the Dutch East Indies in the 1938 FIFA World Cup. He also played for HBS Soerabaja. Telwe is deceased.
