= Karel Černý (footballer) =

Czech footballer

Personal information
- Date of birth: 1 February 1910
- Position: Defender

Senior career*
Years	Team	Apps	(Gls)
1932–1933	SK Plzeň		
1933–1937	SK Židenice		
1937–1942	SK Slavia Prague		
1942–1944	SK Nusle		
- * Club domestic league appearances and goals

Karel Černý (born 1 February 1910, date of death unknown) was a Czech football defender who was a member of the Czechoslovakia national team at the 1938 FIFA World Cup. However, he never earned a cap for the national team. At club level, he played for various clubs, most notably SK Slavia Prague, where he won three consecutive league championships in the 1939–40, 1940–41 and 1941–42 seasons. He also made 11 appearances in the Mitropa Cup. Černý is deceased.
