= Jean Petit (footballer, born 1914) =

Belgian footballer

Personal information
- Date of birth: 25 February 1914
- Place of birth: Liège, Belgium
- Date of death: 25 May 1944 (aged 30)
- Place of death: Liege, Belgium
- Position: Defender

Senior career*
Years	Team	Apps	(Gls)
1930–1939	Standard de Liège		

International career
1938	Belgium	4	(0)
- * Club domestic league appearances and goals

Jean Petit (French: [ʒɑ̃ pəti]; 25 February 1914 – 25 May 1944) was a Belgian footballer. He was born in Liège, Belgium. He played as a defender for Standard de Liège. He played four times for Belgium in 1938.

== Personal life and death ==
Petit retired from professional football early and became a medical doctor. He was killed during the Second World War in an Allied air raid in the Liege suburb of Kinkempois after attending a patient injured in an earlier raid.

== Honours ==
- Belgian international in 1938 (4 caps)
- Picked for the 1938 World Cup (did not play)
- Vice-Champion of Belgium in 1936 with Standard de Liège
