= Jan Harting =

Indonesian footballer

Personal information
- Place of birth: Dutch East Indies
- Position: Defender

Senior career*
| Years | Team | Apps | (Gls) |
- HBS Soerabaja

International career
- Dutch East Indies
- * Club domestic league appearances and goals

Jan Harting was an Indonesian football defender who played for the Dutch East Indies in the 1938 FIFA World Cup. He also played for HBS Soerabaja. Harting is deceased.
