= Hendrikus Plenter =

Dutch footballer

Henk Plenter
Personal information
- Date of birth: 23 June 1913
- Place of birth: Groningen, Netherlands
- Date of death: 12 May 1997 (aged 83)
- Place of death: Groningen
- Position: Defender

Senior career*
Years	Team	Apps	(Gls)
- Be Quick 1887
- * Club domestic league appearances and goals

Hendrikus A. Plenter (1913–1997) was a Dutch football defender who was a member of the Netherlands' squad at the 1938 FIFA World Cup. However, he never made an appearance for the national team. He also played for Be Quick 1887.
