= Klaas Ooms =

Dutch footballer

Personal information
- Date of birth: 9 June 1917
- Place of birth: Amsterdam, Netherlands
- Date of death: 17 January 1970 (aged 52)
- Position: Forward

Senior career*
Years	Team	Apps	(Gls)
- DWV
- * Club domestic league appearances and goals

Klaas Ooms (9 June 1917 – 17 January 1970) was a Dutch football forward who was a member of the Netherlands' squad at the 1938 FIFA World Cup. However, he never made an appearance for the national team. He also played for DWV.
