= Miklós Nagy (footballer) =

Romanian footballer

Personal information
- Full name: Niculae Nagy
- Date of birth: 11 January 1918
- Place of birth: Romania
- Date of death: Unknown
- Position: Forward

Senior career*
Years	Team	Apps	(Gls)
- Crişana Oradea
- * Club domestic league appearances and goals

Miklós Nagy or Niculae Nagy (born 11 January 1918, date of death unknown) was a Romanian football forward who was a member of the Romania national team at the 1938 FIFA World Cup. However, he never earned a cap for his country. He also played for Crişana Oradea. Nagy is deceased.
