= József Pálinkás (footballer, born 1912) =

Hungarian footballer

Personal information
- Full name: József Pálinkás
- Date of birth: March 10, 1912
- Place of birth: Hungary
- Date of death: 24 April 1991 (aged 79)
- Position: Goalkeeper

Senior career*
Years	Team	Apps	(Gls)
- Szeged FC

International career
- Hungary
Medal record
Representing Hungary
FIFA World Cup
Runner-up	1938 France
- * Club domestic league appearances and goals

József Pálinkás (March 10, 1912 – April 24, 1991) was a Hungarian football goalkeeper who played for Hungary in the 1938 FIFA World Cup. He also played for Szeged FC.
