= Hjalmar Andresen =

Norwegian footballer (1914-1982)

Personal information
- Date of birth: 18 July 1914
- Date of death: 22 June 1982 (aged 67)
- Position: Forward

Senior career*
Years	Team	Apps	(Gls)
- Sarpsborg

International career
	Norway	6	(0)
- * Club domestic league appearances and goals

Hjalmar "Hjallen" Andresen (18 July 1914 – 22 June 1982) was a Norwegian football forward. He played for Norway in the 1938 FIFA World Cup. He was capped six times. On the club level he played for Sarpsborg FK. He died in June 1982 and was buried in Tune.
