= Frans Hogenbirk =

Dutch footballer

Personal information
- Full name: Franciscus Hogenbirk
- Date of birth: 18 March 1918
- Place of birth: Groningen, Netherlands
- Date of death: 13 September 1998 (aged 80)
- Place of death: Haren, Netherlands
- Position: Midfielder

Senior career*
| Years | Team | Apps | (Gls) |
| 1934–1949 | Be Quick 1887 | | |

Managerial career
- 1953: Be Quick 1887
- 1956–1957: Be Quick 1887
- * Club domestic league appearances and goals

Franciscus Hogenbirk (18 March 1918 – 13 September 1998) was a Dutch football midfielder who was a member of the Netherlands' squad at the 1938 FIFA World Cup. However, he never made an appearance for the national team. He also played for Be Quick 1887 and coached the team in the 1950s.
