= Michel Brusseaux =

French footballer (1913-1986)

Personal information
- Date of birth: 19 March 1913
- Place of birth: Oran, French Algeria
- Date of death: 28 February 1986 (aged 72)
- Position: Striker

Senior career*
Years	Team	Apps	(Gls)
?–?	US Hammam Bou-Hadja		
1936–1937	Nice		
1937–1939	FC Sète		
1939–1940	Saint-Étienne		
1944–1947	Saint-Étienne		
1947–1948	Nancy		

International career
1938	France	1	(0)

Managerial career
- 1957–1958: Ajaccio
- * Club domestic league appearances and goals

Michel Brusseaux (19 March 1913 – 28 February 1986) was a professional French association footballer. He was born in Oran.
