= Frans Gommers =

Belgian footballer

François Gommers
Personal information
- Date of birth: 5 April 1917
- Place of birth: Antwerp, Belgium
- Date of death: 20 April 1996 (aged 79)

Senior career*
Years	Team	Apps	(Gls)
1935–1946	Beerschot VAC		
1946–1947	Standard de Liège		

International career
1938	Belgium	2	(0)

Managerial career
- 1952–1953: Beerschot VAC
- * Club domestic league appearances and goals

François Gommers (5 April 1917 in Antwerp, Belgium – 20 April 1996) was a Belgian footballer. He was a defender for Beerschot VAC with whom he was twice Belgian Champion in 1938 and 1939.

He was also a Belgium international in 1938, playing in two friendly matches. He finished his career in 1946, at Standard de Liège, and then rejoined his first club, where he coached the first team, from 1952 to 1953.

== Honours ==
- International from 1938 (2 caps)
- First international: France-Belgium, 5–3, 30 January 1938
- Picked for the 1938 World Cup (did not play)
- Belgian Champion in 1938 and 1939 with Beerschot VAC
