= Gerrit Faulhaber =

Indonesian footballer

Personal information
- Full name: Gerrit Henri Victor Lodewijk Faulhaber
- Date of birth: 22 September 1912
- Place of birth: Cileduk, Dutch East Indies
- Date of death: 1951 (aged 38–39)
- Position: Midfielder

Senior career*
Years	Team	Apps	(Gls)
- Djocoja Djokjakarta

International career
- Dutch East Indies
- * Club domestic league appearances and goals

Gerrit Henri Victor Lodewijk Faulhaber (22 September 1912 – 1951) was an Indonesian football midfielder who played for the Dutch East Indies in the 1938 FIFA World Cup. He also played for Djocoja Djokjakarta.
