= Paul Henry (Belgian footballer) =

Belgian footballer (1912–1989)

Personal information
- Date of birth: 6 September 1912
- Place of birth: Namur, Belgium
- Date of death: 6 October 1989 (aged 77)
- Position: Midfielder

Senior career*
Years	Team	Apps	(Gls)
1931–1935	Namur Sports		
1935–1942	Daring de Bruxelles		

International career
1936–1940	Belgium	9	(0)
- * Club domestic league appearances and goals

Paul Henry (6 September 1912 – 6 October 1989) was a Belgian footballer played as a midfielder for his hometown club Namur Sports, for Daring de Bruxelles and for the Belgium national team.

== Honours ==
DC Bruxelles

- Belgian First Division: 1936, 1937; runner-up 1938
