= Arie de Winter =

Dutch footballer (1915–1983)

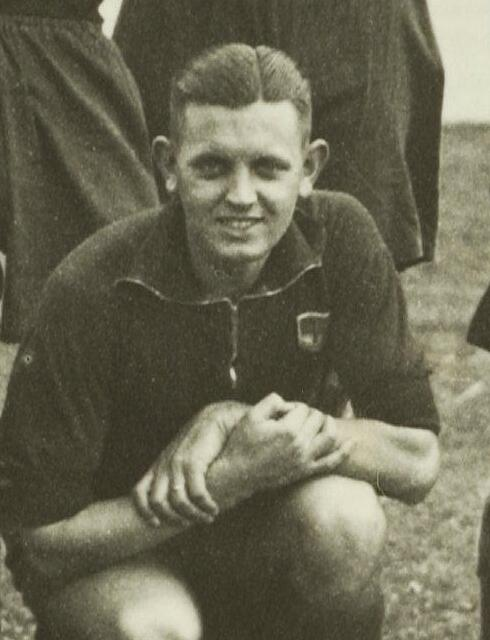
- De Winter (1939-40)

Personal information
- Full name: Arend Harm de Winter
- Date of birth: 28 August 1915
- Place of birth: Zwolle
- Date of death: 1 January 1983 (aged 67)
- Height: 1.79 m (5 ft 10 in)
- Position: Forward

Senior career*
Years	Team	Apps	(Gls)
	HFC Haarlem	261	
- * Club domestic league appearances and goals

Arend Harm "Arie" de Winter (1915–1983) was a Dutch football forward who was a member of the Netherlands' squad at the 1938 FIFA World Cup. However, he never made an appearance for the national team. He played 261 matches as an amateur footballer for HFC Haarlem and was captain of the only Haarlem team to win the Dutch championship, in 1946. He married Agatha Klootwijk in 1944 and in 1946 was employed as a civic servant. Little is written about him, and in the past Arie de Winter has also been identified as Adrianus Johannes de Winter (born 1913, Haarlem); however, in the Haarlemse Courant of July 1944, "A.H. de Winter" of the Haarlem football club is reported to have won the annual heptathlon for football players with a record score; the better known J.C. Smit of the same club was in second place.
