= Leen van Beuzekom =

Indonesian footballer

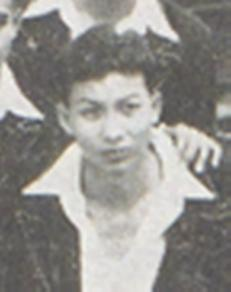
- Leen van Beuzekom in 1938

Personal information
- Full name: L. N. van Beuzekom
- Place of birth: Dutch East Indies
- Position: Goalkeeper

Senior career*
Years	Team	Apps	(Gls)
193?—1936	VIOS Batavia		
1936—194?	Hercules Batavia		

International career
- Dutch East Indies
- * Club domestic league appearances and goals

L.N. "Leen" van Beuzekom was an Indonesian footballer who played as a goalkeeper for the Dutch East Indies in the 1938 FIFA World Cup. He also played for VIOS Batavia and Hercules Batavia. Van Beuzekom is deceased.

== Honours ==
VBO (Voetbalbond Batavia en Omstreken)

- Dutch East Indies Championship: 1939
