= Jan Mastenbroek =

Dutch football manager

Personal information
- Full name: Johannes Christoffel Jan Mastenbroek
- Date of birth: 5 July 1902
- Place of birth: Dordrecht, Netherlands
- Date of death: 23 May 1978 (aged 75)
- Place of death: Enschede, Netherlands

Managerial career
- Years: Team
- 1934–1938: Dutch East Indies National team

Johannes Christoffel Jan Mastenbroek (5 July 1902 – 23 May 1978) was a Dutch football manager who coached the Dutch East Indies national team at the 1938 FIFA World Cup.

Mastenbroek was born and raised in Dordrecht, son of Klaas Mastenbroek, a tailor, and Goverdina Rackwitsz. In 1924, he married Johanna van den Bovenkamp in Hengelo, at which time he was a schoolteacher.

He was the chairman of the Nederlandsch-Indische Voetbal Unie (Dutch East Indies Football Union) and the vice-president of the Dutch East Indies Olympic Committee.
