= List of FIFA World Cup winning players =

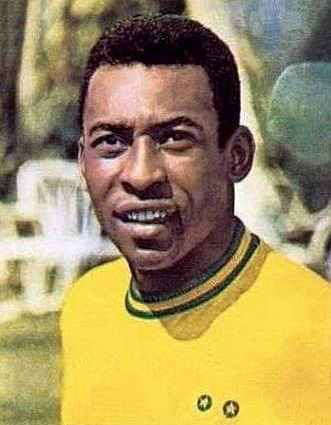
Pelé is the only player to win the World Cup three times, having been part of the Brazilian squad in 1958, 1962, and 1970.

This page is a list of all players who have won the mens FIFA World Cup tournament since its inception in 1930.

Participating teams have to register squads for each edition of the World Cup, which consisted of 22 players until 1998, then of 23 players from 2002 to 2018, and then of 26 players from 2022. Since 1978, winners' medals are given to all members of the winning squads. Prior to that, only players who were on the pitch during the final matches (or the de facto final in 1950) received medals. FIFA decided in 2007 to retroactively award winners' medals to all members of the winning squads between 1930 and 1974.

World Cup winning players are among a selected few who are officially allowed to touch the FIFA World Cup Trophy with bare hands; the group also includes managers who have won the competition, heads of state, and FIFA officials.

== Winning players ==
A total of 497 players have been in the winning team in the World Cup. Brazil's Pelé is the only one to have won three times, while another 21 have won twice. Only players from Brazil and Italy, and one player from Argentina, have won the World Cup more than once.

- No player so far has won two World Cups both as captain. Italy's Giuseppe Meazza (1938), Brazil's Bellini (1958), Mauro (1962), and Cafu (2002), and Argentina's Daniel Passarella (1978) lifted the trophy once as captain, but were not captain for the other tournament they won. Argentina's Diego Maradona, Brazil's Dunga, and France's Hugo Lloris captained their sides in two final matches, and Argentina's Lionel Messi captained his side in three final matches, but only won on one of their occasions, while West Germany's Karl-Heinz Rummenigge lost both finals as captain.
- Brazil's Vavá (1958, 1962) and Pelé (1958, 1970) scored in two finals for winning teams; three more players, West Germany's Paul Breitner and France's Zinedine Zidane and Kylian Mbappé, have scored in two finals, but only won on the first occasion. England's Geoff Hurst (1966) scored a hat-trick for the winning team in the final, while Mbappé achieved a hat-trick in the final he lost.
- Brazil's Cafu (1994, 1998, 2002) and Argentina's Lionel Messi (2014, 2022, 2026) are the only players to play in three finals, with Cafu the only player to play three consecutively. Brazilians Castilho, Nílton Santos, Pelé, and Ronaldo, and West Germany's Pierre Littbarski and Lothar Matthäus, also were three times in a squad that reached the final, but none of them were on the pitch for all three finals.
- Luis Monti is the only player to appear in two finals for different national teams. He played in the 1930 final for Argentina, who lost, and the 1934 final for Italy, who won. Attilio Demaría was also in Argentina's 1930 squad and Italy's 1934 squad, but appeared in neither final.
- Brazil's Mário Zagallo, having triumphed in 1958 and 1962 as player, went on to win as the manager in 1970, becoming the first to win both as player and manager. West Germany's Franz Beckenbauer is the second, winning as captain in 1974 and as manager in 1990. France's Didier Deschamps is the third: he led his team to victory in 1998 as captain, and then in 2018 as manager.
- Germany's Miroslav Klose is the only player to have won four World Cup medals: 2002 (silver), 2006, 2010 (both bronze), and 2014 (gold).

In the below table, years in bold indicate that the player appeared in the respective final match where his team won, while years in italics indicate that the player was an unused squad member in the respective tournament. Until 1974 members of squads who had not played in the respective final matches were not eligible for winners' medals, but in 2007 FIFA retroactively awarded 122 of these medals to the players concerned or their families.

Players who have won the World Cup
Player	Team	Titles won		Other appearances	Profile	Birth	Death
Player	Team	Number	Years	Other appearances	Profile	Birth	Death
Pelé	Brazil	3	**1958**, 1962, **1970**	1966	(Note: PELÉ (Edson Arantes do Nascimento) – FIFA competition record (archived))	1940	2022
Bellini	Brazil	2	**1958**, 1962	1966	(Note: BELLINI – FIFA competition record (archived))	1930	2014
Cafu	Brazil	2	**1994**, **2002**	1998, 2006	(Note: CAFU – FIFA competition record (archived))	1970	
Castilho	Brazil	2	1958, 1962	1950, 1954	(Note: CASTILHO – FIFA competition record (archived))	1927	1987
Didi	Brazil	2	**1958**, **1962**	1954	(Note: DIDI – FIFA competition record (archived))	1928	2001
Djalma Santos	Brazil	2	**1958**, **1962**	1954, 1966	(Note: DJALMA SANTOS – FIFA competition record (archived))	1929	2013
Giovanni Ferrari	Italy	2	**1934**, **1938**		(Note: Giovanni FERRARI – FIFA competition record (archived))	1907	1982
Garrincha	Brazil	2	**1958**, **1962**	1966	(Note: GARRINCHA – FIFA competition record (archived))	1933	1983
Gilmar	Brazil	2	**1958**, **1962**	1966	(Note: GILMAR (Gilmar Dos Santos Neves) – FIFA competition record (archived))	1930	2013
Guido Masetti	Italy	2	1934, 1938		(Note: Guido MASETTI – FIFA competition record (archived))	1907	1993
Mauro	Brazil	2	1958, **1962**	1954	(Note: MAURO RAMOS – FIFA competition record (archived))	1930	2002
Giuseppe Meazza	Italy	2	**1934**, **1938**		(Note: Giuseppe MEAZZA – FIFA competition record (archived))	1910	1979
Eraldo Monzeglio	Italy	2	**1934**, 1938		(Note: Eraldo MONZEGLIO – FIFA competition record (archived))	1906	1981
Nílton Santos	Brazil	2	**1958**, **1962**	1950, 1954	(Note: NILTON SANTOS – FIFA competition record (archived))	1925	2013
Daniel Passarella	Argentina	2	**1978**, 1986	1982	(Note: Daniel PASSARELLA – FIFA competition record (archived))	1953	
Pepe	Brazil	2	1958, 1962		(Note: PEPE – FIFA competition record (archived))	1935	
Ronaldo	Brazil	2	1994, **2002**	1998, 2006	(Note: RONALDO – FIFA competition record (archived))	1976	
Vavá	Brazil	2	**1958**, **1962**		(Note: VAVA – FIFA competition record (archived))	1934	2002
Mário Zagallo	Brazil	2	**1958**, **1962**		(Note: Mario ZAGALLO – FIFA competition record (archived))	1931	2024
Zito	Brazil	2	**1958**, **1962**	1966	(Note: ZITO – FIFA competition record (archived))	1932	2015
Zózimo	Brazil	2	1958, **1962**		(Note: ZOZIMO – FIFA competition record (archived))	1932	1977
Marcos Acuña	Argentina	1	**2022**	2018	(Note: Marcos ACUNA – FIFA competition record (archived))	1991	
Ado	Brazil	1	1970		(Note: ADO – FIFA competition record (archived))	1944	
Raúl Albiol	Spain	1	2010	2014	(Note: Raul ALBIOL – FIFA competition record (archived))	1985	
Aldair	Brazil	1	**1994**	1990, 1998	(Note: ALDAIR – FIFA competition record (archived))	1965	
Luigi Allemandi	Italy	1	**1934**		(Note: Luigi ALLEMANDI – FIFA competition record (archived))	1903	1978
Thiago Almada	Argentina	1	2022	2026		2001	
Sergio Almirón	Argentina	1	1986		(Note: Sergio ALMIRON – FIFA competition record (archived))	1958	
Norberto Alonso	Argentina	1	1978		(Note: Norberto ALONSO – FIFA competition record (archived))	1953	
Xabi Alonso	Spain	1	**2010**	2006, 2014	(Note: Xabi Alonso – FIFA competition record (archived))	1981	
José Altafini	Brazil	1	1958	1962 (for Italy)	(Note: Jose ALTAFINI – FIFA competition record (archived))	1938	
Altair	Brazil	1	1962	1966	(Note: ALTAIR – FIFA competition record (archived))	1938	2019
Alessandro Altobelli	Italy	1	**1982**	1986	(Note: Alessandro ALTOBELLI – FIFA competition record (archived))	1955	
Julián Alvarez	Argentina	1	**2022**	2026		2000	
Amarildo	Brazil	1	1962		(Note: AMARILDO – FIFA competition record (archived))	1939	
Marco Amelia	Italy	1	2006		(Note: Marco AMELIA – FIFA competition record (archived))	1982	
Ânderson Polga	Brazil	1	2002		(Note: ANDERSON POLGA – FIFA competition record (archived))	1979	
José Andrade	Uruguay	1	**1930**		(Note: Jose ANDRADE – FIFA competition record (archived))	1901	1957
Michele Andreolo	Italy	1	**1938**		(Note: Michele ANDREOLO – FIFA competition record (archived))	1912	1981
Peregrino Anselmo	Uruguay	1	1930		(Note: Juan ANSELMO – FIFA competition record (archived))	1902	1975
Giancarlo Antognoni	Italy	1	1982	1978	(Note: Giancarlo ANTOGNONI – FIFA competition record (archived))	1954	
Álvaro Arbeloa	Spain	1	2010		(Note: Álvaro Arbeloa – FIFA competition record (archived))	1983	
Pietro Arcari	Italy	1	1934		(Note: Pietro ARCARI – FIFA competition record (archived))	1909	1988
Osvaldo Ardiles	Argentina	1	**1978**	1982	(Note: Osvaldo ARDILES – FIFA competition record (archived))	1952	
Alphonse Areola	France	1	2018	2022	(Note: Alphonse AREOLA – FIFA competition record (archived))	1993	
Franco Armani	Argentina	1	2022	2018	(Note: Franco ARMANI – FIFA competition record (archived))	1986	
Jimmy Armfield	England	1	1966	1962	(Note: Jimmy ARMFIELD – FIFA competition record (archived))	1935	2018
Klaus Augenthaler	West Germany	1	**1990**	1986	(Note: Klaus AUGENTHALER – FIFA competition record (archived))	1957	
Raimond Aumann	West Germany	1	1990		(Note: Raimond AUMANN – FIFA competition record (archived))	1963	
Álex Baena	Spain	1	**2026**			2001	
Baldocchi	Brazil	1	1970		(Note: BALDOCHI – FIFA competition record (archived))	1946	
Héctor Baley	Argentina	1	1978	1982	(Note: Hector BALEY – FIFA competition record (archived))	1950	
Alan Ball	England	1	**1966**	1970	(Note: Alan BALL – FIFA competition record (archived))	1945	2007
Enrique Ballestrero	Uruguay	1	**1930**		(Note: Enrique BALLESTRERO – FIFA competition record (archived))	1905	1969
Gordon Banks	England	1	**1966**	1962, (Note: As per FIFA's website. Another source states that Banks was omitted from the 1962 squad.) 1970	(Note: Gordon BANKS – FIFA competition record (archived))	1937	2019
Franco Baresi	Italy	1	1982	1990, 1994	(Note: Franco BARESI – FIFA competition record (archived))	1960	2026
Simone Barone	Italy	1	2006		(Note: Simone BARONE – FIFA competition record (archived))	1978	
Fabien Barthez	France	1	**1998**	2002, 2006	(Note: Fabien BARTHEZ – FIFA competition record (archived))	1971	
Andrea Barzagli	Italy	1	2006	2014	(Note: Andrea BARZAGLI – FIFA competition record (archived))	1981	
Sergio Batista	Argentina	1	**1986**	1990	(Note: Sergio BATISTA – FIFA competition record (archived))	1962	
Hans Bauer	West Germany	1	1954		(Note: Hans BAUER – FIFA competition record (archived))	1927	1997
Bebeto	Brazil	1	**1994**	1990, 1998	(Note: BEBETO – FIFA competition record (archived))	1964	
Franz Beckenbauer	West Germany	1	**1974**	1966, 1970	(Note: Franz BECKENBAUER – FIFA competition record (archived))	1945	2024
Uwe Bein	West Germany	1	1990		(Note: Uwe BEIN – FIFA competition record (archived))	1960	
Juliano Belletti	Brazil	1	2002		(Note: BELLETTI – FIFA competition record (archived))	1976	
Giuseppe Bergomi	Italy	1	**1982**	1986, 1990, 1998	(Note: Giuseppe BERGOMI – FIFA competition record (archived))	1963	
Thomas Berthold	West Germany	1	**1990**	1986, 1994	(Note: Thomas BERTHOLD – FIFA competition record (archived))	1964	
Luigi Bertolini	Italy	1	**1934**		(Note: Luigi BERTOLINI – FIFA competition record (archived))	1904	1977
Daniel Bertoni	Argentina	1	**1978**	1982	(Note: Daniel BERTONI – FIFA competition record (archived))	1955	
Sergio Bertoni	Italy	1	1938		(Note: Sergio BERTONI – FIFA competition record (archived))	1915	1995
Amedeo Biavati	Italy	1	**1938**		(Note: Amedeo BIAVATI – FIFA competition record (archived))	1915	1979
Ulrich Biesinger	West Germany	1	1954		(Note: Uli BIESINGER – FIFA competition record (archived))	1933	2011
Laurent Blanc	France	1	1998		(Note: Laurent BLANC – FIFA competition record (archived))	1965	
Jérôme Boateng	Germany	1	**2014**	2010, 2018	(Note: Jerome BOATENG – FIFA competition record (archived))	1988	
Ricardo Bochini	Argentina	1	1986		(Note: Ricardo BOCHINI – FIFA competition record (archived))	1954	
Alain Boghossian	France	1	**1998**	2002	(Note: Alain BOGHOSSIAN – FIFA competition record (archived))	1970	
Peter Bonetti	England	1	1966	1970	(Note: Peter BONETTI – FIFA competition record (archived))	1941	2020
Rainer Bonhof	West Germany	1	**1974**	1978	(Note: Rainer BONHOF – FIFA competition record (archived))	1952	
Ivano Bordon	Italy	1	1982	1978	(Note: Ivano BORDON – FIFA competition record (archived))	1951	
Felice Borel	Italy	1	1934		(Note: Felice BOREL – FIFA competition record (archived))	1914	1993
Claudio Borghi	Argentina	1	1986		(Note: Claudio BORGHI – FIFA competition record (archived))	1964	
Branco	Brazil	1	**1994**	1986, 1990	(Note: BRANCO – FIFA competition record (archived))	1964	
Andreas Brehme	West Germany	1	**1990**	1986, 1994	(Note: Andreas BREHME – FIFA competition record (archived))	1960	2024
Paul Breitner	West Germany	1	**1974**	1982	(Note: Paul BREITNER – FIFA competition record (archived))	1951	
Brito	Brazil	1	**1970**	1966	(Note: BRITO – FIFA competition record (archived))	1939	2026
Julio César Britos	Uruguay	1	1950		(Note: Julio Cesar BRITOS – FIFA competition record (archived))	1926	1998
José Luis Brown	Argentina	1	**1986**		(Note: Jose BROWN – FIFA competition record (archived))	1956	2019
Guido Buchwald	West Germany	1	**1990**	1994	(Note: Guido BUCHWALD – FIFA competition record (archived))	1961	
Gianluigi Buffon	Italy	1	**2006**	1998, 2002, 2010, 2014	(Note: Gianluigi BUFFON – FIFA competition record (archived))	1978	
Juan Burgueño	Uruguay	1	1950		(Note: Juan BURGUENO – FIFA competition record (archived))	1923	1997
Jorge Burruchaga	Argentina	1	**1986**	1990	(Note: Jorge BURRUCHAGA – FIFA competition record (archived))	1962	
Sergio Busquets	Spain	1	**2010**	2014, 2018, 2022	(Note: Sergio BUSQUETS – FIFA competition record (archived))	1988	
Gerry Byrne	England	1	1966		(Note: Gerry BYRNE – FIFA competition record (archived))	1938	2015
Antonio Cabrini	Italy	1	**1982**	1978, 1986	(Note: Antonio CABRINI – FIFA competition record (archived))	1957	
Caju	Brazil	1	1970	1974	(Note: PAULO CESAR – FIFA competition record (archived))	1949	
Umberto Caligaris	Italy	1	1934		(Note: Umberto CALIGARIS – FIFA competition record (archived))	1901	1940
Ian Callaghan	England	1	1966		(Note: Ian CALLAGHAN – FIFA competition record (archived))	1942	
Juan Carlos Calvo	Uruguay	1	1930		(Note: Juan Carlos CALVO – FIFA competition record (archived))	1906	1977
Mauro Camoranesi	Italy	1	**2006**	2010	(Note: Mauro CAMORANESI – FIFA competition record (archived))	1976	
Vincent Candela	France	1	1998	2002	(Note: Vincent CANDELA – FIFA competition record (archived))	1973	
Fabio Cannavaro	Italy	1	**2006**	1998, 2002, 2010	(Note: Fabio CANNAVARO – FIFA competition record (archived))	1973	
Joan Capdevila	Spain	1	**2010**		(Note: Joan CAPDEVILA – FIFA competition record (archived))	1978	
Miguel Capuccini	Uruguay	1	1930		(Note: Miguel CAPPUCCINI – FIFA competition record (archived))	1904	1980
Carlos Alberto	Brazil	1	**1970**		(Note: CARLOS ALBERTO – FIFA competition record (archived))	1944	2016
Iker Casillas	Spain	1	**2010**	2002, 2006, 2014	(Note: Iker CASILLAS – FIFA competition record (archived))	1981	
Armando Castellazzi	Italy	1	1934		(Note: Armando CASTELLAZZI – FIFA competition record (archived))	1904	1968
Héctor Castro	Uruguay	1	**1930**		(Note: Hector CASTRO – FIFA competition record (archived))	1904	1960
Franco Causio	Italy	1	**1982**	1974, 1978	(Note: Franco CAUSIO – FIFA competition record (archived))	1949	
Giuseppe Cavanna	Italy	1	1934		(Note: Giuseppe CAVANNA – FIFA competition record (archived))	1905	1976
Pedro Cea	Uruguay	1	**1930**		(Note: Pedro CEA – FIFA competition record (archived))	1900	1970
Carlo Ceresoli	Italy	1	1938		(Note: Carlo CERESOLI – FIFA competition record (archived))	1910	1995
Lionel Charbonnier	France	1	1998		(Note: Lionel CHARBONNIER – FIFA competition record (archived))	1966	
Bobby Charlton	England	1	**1966**	1958, 1962, 1970	(Note: Bobby CHARLTON – FIFA competition record (archived))	1937	2023
Jack Charlton	England	1	**1966**	1970	(Note: Jack CHARLTON – FIFA competition record (archived))	1935	2020
Bruno Chizzo	Italy	1	1938		(Note: Bruno CHIZZO – FIFA competition record (archived))	1916	1969
Néstor Clausen	Argentina	1	1986		(Note: Nestor CLAUSEN – FIFA competition record (archived))	1962	
Clodoaldo	Brazil	1	**1970**		(Note: CLODOALDO – FIFA competition record (archived))	1949	
George Cohen	England	1	**1966**		(Note: George COHEN – FIFA competition record (archived))	1939	2022
Gino Colaussi	Italy	1	**1938**		(Note: Gino COLAUSSI – FIFA competition record (archived))	1914	1991
Fulvio Collovati	Italy	1	**1982**	1986	(Note: Fulvio COLLOVATI – FIFA competition record (archived))	1957	
Gianpiero Combi	Italy	1	**1934**		(Note: Giampiero COMBI – FIFA competition record (archived))	1902	1956
John Connelly	England	1	1966	1962	(Note: John CONNELLY – FIFA competition record (archived))	1938	2012
Bruno Conti	Italy	1	**1982**	1986	(Note: Bruno CONTI – FIFA competition record (archived))	1955	
Coutinho	Brazil	1	1962		(Note: COUTINHO – FIFA competition record (archived))	1943	2019
Ángel Correa	Argentina	1	2022		(Note: Angel CORREA – FIFA competition record (archived))	1995	
Pau Cubarsí	Spain	1	**2026**			2007	
José Luis Cuciuffo	Argentina	1	**1986**		(Note: Jose CUCIUFFO – FIFA competition record (archived))	1961	2004
Marc Cucurella	Spain	1	**2026**			1998	
Bernhard Cullmann	West Germany	1	1974	1978	(Note: Bernd CULLMANN – FIFA competition record (archived))	1949	
Dario	Brazil	1	1970		(Note: DARIO – FIFA competition record (archived))	1946	
Daniele De Rossi	Italy	1	**2006**	2010, 2014	(Note: Daniele DE ROSSI – FIFA competition record (archived))	1983	
De Sordi	Brazil	1	1958		(Note: DE SORDI – FIFA competition record (archived))	1931	2013
Alessandro Del Piero	Italy	1	**2006**	1998, 2002	(Note: Alessandro DEL PIERO – FIFA competition record (archived))	1974	
Attilio Demaría	Italy	1	1934	1930 (for Argentina)	(Note: Atilio DEMARIA – FIFA competition record (archived))	1909	1990
Ousmane Dembélé	France	1	2018	2022, 2026	(Note: Ousmane DEMBELE – FIFA competition record (archived))	1997	
Denílson	Brazil	1	**2002**	1998	(Note: DENILSON – FIFA competition record (archived))	1977	
Rodrigo De Paul	Argentina	1	**2022**	2026		1994	
Marcel Desailly	France	1	**1998**	2002	(Note: Marcel DESAILLY – FIFA competition record (archived))	1968	
Didier Deschamps	France	1	**1998**		(Note: Didier DESCHAMPS – FIFA competition record (archived))	1968	
Dida	Brazil	1	1958		(Note: DIDA – FIFA competition record (archived))	1934	2002
Dida	Brazil	1	2002	1998, 2006	(Note: DIDA – FIFA competition record (archived))	1973	
Ángel Di María	Argentina	1	**2022**	2010, 2014, 2018	(Note: Angel DI MARIA – FIFA competition record (archived))	1988	
Dino Sani	Brazil	1	1958		(Note: DINO SANI – FIFA competition record (archived))	1932	2026
Bernard Diomède	France	1	1998		(Note: Bernard DIOMEDE – FIFA competition record (archived))	1974	
Youri Djorkaeff	France	1	**1998**	2002	(Note: Youri DJORKAEFF – FIFA competition record (archived))	1968	
Aldo Donati	Italy	1	1938		(Note: Aldo DONATI – FIFA competition record (archived))	1910	1984
Pablo Dorado	Uruguay	1	**1930**		(Note: Pablo DORADO – FIFA competition record (archived))	1908	1978
Giuseppe Dossena	Italy	1	1982		(Note: Giuseppe DOSSENA – FIFA competition record (archived))	1958	
Julian Draxler	Germany	1	2014	2018	(Note: Julian DRAXLER – FIFA competition record (archived))	1993	
Christophe Dugarry	France	1	**1998**	2002	(Note: Christophe DUGARRY – FIFA competition record (archived))	1972	
Dunga	Brazil	1	**1994**	1990, 1998	(Note: DUNGA – FIFA competition record (archived))	1963	
Erik Durm	Germany	1	2014		(Note: Erik DURM – FIFA competition record (archived))	1992	
Paulo Dybala	Argentina	1	**2022**	2018	(Note: Paulo DYBALA – FIFA competition record (archived))	1993	
George Eastham	England	1	1966	1962	(Note: George EASTHAM – FIFA competition record (archived))	1936	2024
Horst Eckel	West Germany	1	**1954**	1958	(Note: Horst ECKEL – FIFA competition record (archived))	1932	2021
Edílson	Brazil	1	2002		(Note: EDILSON – FIFA competition record (archived))	1971	
Edmílson	Brazil	1	**2002**		(Note: EDMILSON – FIFA competition record (archived))	1976	
Edu	Brazil	1	1970	1966, 1974	(Note: EDU – FIFA competition record (archived))	1949	
Héctor Enrique	Argentina	1	**1986**		(Note: Hector ENRIQUE – FIFA competition record (archived))	1962	
Herbert Erhardt	West Germany	1	1954	1958, 1962	(Note: Herbert ERHARDT – FIFA competition record (archived))	1930	2010
Everaldo	Brazil	1	**1970**		(Note: EVERALDO – FIFA competition record (archived))	1944	1974
Cesc Fàbregas	Spain	1	**2010**	2006, 2014	(Note: Cesc FABREGAS – FIFA competition record (archived))	1987	
Nabil Fekir	France	1	**2018**		(Note: Nabil FEKIR – FIFA competition record (archived))	1993	
Félix	Brazil	1	**1970**		(Note: FELIX – FIFA competition record (archived))	1937	2012
Enzo Fernández	Argentina	1	**2022**	2026		2001	
Lorenzo Fernández	Uruguay	1	**1930**		(Note: Lorenzo FERNANDEZ – FIFA competition record (archived))	1900	1973
Attilio Ferraris	Italy	1	**1934**		(Note: Attilio FERRARIS – FIFA competition record (archived))	1904	1947
Pietro Ferraris	Italy	1	1938		(Note: Pietro FERRARIS – FIFA competition record (archived))	1912	1991
Ubaldo Fillol	Argentina	1	**1978**	1974, 1982	(Note: Ubaldo FILLOL – FIFA competition record (archived))	1950	
Heinz Flohe	West Germany	1	1974	1978	(Note: Heinz FLOHE – FIFA competition record (archived))	1948	2013
Ron Flowers	England	1	1966	1962	(Note: Ron FLOWERS – FIFA competition record (archived))	1934	2021
Alfredo Foni	Italy	1	**1938**		(Note: Alfredo FONI – FIFA competition record (archived))	1911	1985
Fontana	Brazil	1	1970		(Note: FONTANA – FIFA competition record (archived))	1940	1980
Juan Foyth	Argentina	1	2022			1998	
Américo Gallego	Argentina	1	**1978**	1982	(Note: Americo GALLEGO – FIFA competition record (archived))	1955	
Giovanni Galli	Italy	1	1982	1986	(Note: Giovanni GALLI – FIFA competition record (archived))	1958	
Luis Galván	Argentina	1	**1978**	1982	(Note: Luis GALVAN – FIFA competition record (archived))	1948	2025
Rubén Galván	Argentina	1	1978		(Note: Ruben GALVAN – FIFA competition record (archived))	1952	2018
Schubert Gambetta	Uruguay	1	**1950**		(Note: Schubert GAMBETTA – FIFA competition record (archived))	1920	1991
Eric Garcia	Spain	1	**2026**	2022		2001	
Joan Garcia	Spain	1	2026			2001	
Oscar Garré	Argentina	1	1986		(Note: Oscar GARRE – FIFA competition record (archived))	1956	
Gennaro Gattuso	Italy	1	**2006**	2002, 2010	(Note: Gennaro GATTUSO – FIFA competition record (archived))	1978	
Gavi	Spain	1	2026	2022		2004	
Mario Genta	Italy	1	1938		(Note: Mario GENTA – FIFA competition record (archived))	1912	1993
Claudio Gentile	Italy	1	**1982**	1978	(Note: Claudio GENTILE – FIFA competition record (archived))	1953	
Gérson	Brazil	1	**1970**	1966	(Note: GERSON – FIFA competition record (archived))	1941	
Álvaro Gestido	Uruguay	1	**1930**		(Note: Alvaro GESTIDO – FIFA competition record (archived))	1907	1957
Alcides Ghiggia	Uruguay	1	**1950**		(Note: Alcides GHIGGIA – FIFA competition record (archived))	1926	2015
Alberto Gilardino	Italy	1	2006	2010	(Note: Alberto GILARDINO – FIFA competition record (archived))	1982	
Gilberto Silva	Brazil	1	**2002**	2006, 2010	(Note: GILBERTO SILVA – FIFA competition record (archived))	1976	
Gilmar Rinaldi	Brazil	1	1994		(Note: GILMAR RINALDI – FIFA competition record (archived))	1959	
Matthias Ginter	Germany	1	2014	2018, 2022	(Note: Matthias GINTER – FIFA competition record (archived))	1994	
Olivier Giroud	France	1	**2018**	2014, 2022	(Note: Olivier GIROUD – FIFA competition record (archived))	1986	
Ricardo Giusti	Argentina	1	**1986**	1990	(Note: Ricardo GIUSTI – FIFA competition record (archived))	1956	
Papu Gómez	Argentina	1	2022		(Note: Alejandro GOMEZ – FIFA competition record (archived))	1988	
Juan Carlos González	Uruguay	1	1950		(Note: Juan Carlos GONZALEZ – FIFA competition record (archived))	1924	2010
Matías González	Uruguay	1	**1950**		(Note: Matias GONZALEZ – FIFA competition record (archived))	1925	1984
Mario Götze	Germany	1	**2014**	2022	(Note: Mario GOETZE – FIFA competition record (archived))	1992	
Jürgen Grabowski	West Germany	1	**1974**	1966, 1970	(Note: Juergen GRABOWSKI – FIFA competition record (archived))	1944	2022
Francesco Graziani	Italy	1	**1982**	1978	(Note: Francesco GRAZIANI – FIFA competition record (archived))	1952	
Jimmy Greaves	England	1	1966	1962	(Note: Jimmy GREAVES – FIFA competition record (archived))	1940	2021
Antoine Griezmann	France	1	**2018**	2014, 2022	(Note: Antoine GRIEZMANN – FIFA competition record (archived))	1991	
Álex Grimaldo	Spain	1	2026			1995	
Kevin Großkreutz	Germany	1	2014		(Note: Kevin GROßKREUTZ – FIFA competition record (archived))	1988	
Fabio Grosso	Italy	1	**2006**		(Note: Fabio GROSSO – FIFA competition record (archived))	1977	
Enrique Guaita	Italy	1	**1934**		(Note: Enrique GUAITA – FIFA competition record (archived))	1910	1959
Anfilogino Guarisi	Italy	1	1934		(Note: Anfilogino GUARISI – FIFA competition record (archived))	1905	1974
Stéphane Guivarc'h	France	1	**1998**		(Note: Stephane GUIVARCH – FIFA competition record (archived))	1970	
Thomas Häßler	West Germany	1	**1990**	1994, 1998	(Note: Thomas HAESSLER – FIFA competition record (archived))	1966	
Thierry Henry	France	1	1998	2002, 2006, 2010	(Note: Thierry HENRY – FIFA competition record (archived))	1977	
Günter Hermann	West Germany	1	1990		(Note: Guenther HERMANN – FIFA competition record (archived))	1960	
Lucas Hernandez	France	1	**2018**	2022, 2026	(Note: Lucas HERNANDEZ – FIFA competition record (archived))	1996	
Richard Herrmann	West Germany	1	1954		(Note: Richard HERRMANN – FIFA competition record (archived))	1923	1962
Dieter Herzog	West Germany	1	1974		(Note: Dieter HERZOG – FIFA competition record (archived))	1946	2025
Jupp Heynckes	West Germany	1	1974		(Note: Jupp HEYNCKES – FIFA competition record (archived))	1945	
Uli Hoeneß	West Germany	1	**1974**		(Note: Uli HOENESS – FIFA competition record (archived))	1952	
Bernd Hölzenbein	West Germany	1	**1974**	1978	(Note: Bernd HOELZENBEIN – FIFA competition record (archived))	1946	2024
Horst-Dieter Höttges	West Germany	1	1974	1966, 1970	(Note: Horst-Dieter HOETTGES – FIFA competition record (archived))	1943	2023
René Houseman	Argentina	1	**1978**	1974	(Note: Rene HOUSEMAN – FIFA competition record (archived))	1953	2018
Benedikt Höwedes	Germany	1	**2014**		(Note: Benedikt HOEWEDES – FIFA competition record (archived))	1988	
Mats Hummels	Germany	1	**2014**	2018	(Note: Mats HUMMELS – FIFA competition record (archived))	1988	
Roger Hunt	England	1	**1966**	1962	(Note: Roger HUNT – FIFA competition record (archived))	1938	2021
Norman Hunter	England	1	1966	1970	(Note: Norman HUNTER – FIFA competition record (archived))	1943	2020
Geoff Hurst	England	1	**1966**	1970	(Note: Geoff HURST – FIFA competition record (archived))	1941	
Vincenzo Iaquinta	Italy	1	**2006**	2010	(Note: Vincenzo IAQUINTA – FIFA competition record (archived))	1979	
Borja Iglesias	Spain	1	2026			1993	
Bodo Illgner	West Germany	1	**1990**	1994	(Note: Bodo ILLGNER – FIFA competition record (archived))	1967	
Andrés Iniesta	Spain	1	**2010**	2006, 2014, 2018	(Note: Andres INIESTA – FIFA competition record (archived))	1984	
Filippo Inzaghi	Italy	1	2006	1998, 2002	(Note: Filippo INZAGHI – FIFA competition record (archived))	1973	
Santos Iriarte	Uruguay	1	**1930**		(Note: Victoriano IRIARTE – FIFA competition record (archived))	1902	1968
Luis Islas	Argentina	1	1986	1994	(Note: Luis ISLAS – FIFA competition record (archived))	1965	
Jair	Brazil	1	1962		(Note: JAIR DA COSTA – FIFA competition record (archived))	1940	2025
Jair Marinho	Brazil	1	1962		(Note: JAIR MARINHO – FIFA competition record (archived))	1936	2020
Jairzinho	Brazil	1	**1970**	1966, 1974	(Note: JAIRZINHO – FIFA competition record (archived))	1944	
Joel	Brazil	1	1958		(Note: JOEL – FIFA competition record (archived))	1931	2003
Joel Camargo	Brazil	1	1970		(Note: JOEL CAMARGO – FIFA competition record (archived))	1946	2014
Jorginho	Brazil	1	**1994**	1990	(Note: JORGINHO – FIFA competition record (archived))	1964	
Juninho Paulista	Brazil	1	**2002**		(Note: JUNINHO PAULISTA – FIFA competition record (archived))	1973	
Júnior	Brazil	1	2002		(Note: JUNIOR – FIFA competition record (archived))	1973	
Jurandir	Brazil	1	1962		(Note: JURANDIR – FIFA competition record (archived))	1940	1996
Kaká	Brazil	1	2002	2006, 2010	(Note: KAKA – FIFA competition record (archived))	1982	
N'Golo Kanté	France	1	**2018**	2026	(Note: Ngolo KANTE – FIFA competition record (archived))	1991	
Jupp Kapellmann	West Germany	1	1974		(Note: Jupp KAPPELLMANN – FIFA competition record (archived))	1949	
Christian Karembeu	France	1	**1998**		(Note: Christian KAREMBEU – FIFA competition record (archived))	1970	
Mario Kempes	Argentina	1	**1978**	1974, 1982	(Note: Mario KEMPES – FIFA competition record (archived))	1954	
Sami Khedira	Germany	1	2014	2010, 2018	(Note: Sami KHEDIRA – FIFA competition record (archived))	1987	
Daniel Killer	Argentina	1	1978		(Note: Daniel KILLER – FIFA competition record (archived))	1949	
Presnel Kimpembe	France	1	2018		(Note: Presnel KIMPEMBE – FIFA competition record (archived))	1995	
Kléberson	Brazil	1	**2002**	2010	(Note: KLEBERSON – FIFA competition record (archived))	1979	
Wolfgang Kleff	West Germany	1	1974		(Note: Wolfgang KLEFF – FIFA competition record (archived))	1946	
Jürgen Klinsmann	West Germany	1	**1990**	1994, 1998	(Note: Juergen KLINSMANN – FIFA competition record (archived))	1964	
Bernhard Klodt	West Germany	1	1954	1958	(Note: Berni KLODT – FIFA competition record (archived))	1926	1996
Miroslav Klose	Germany	1	**2014**	2002, 2006, 2010	(Note: Miroslav KLOSE – FIFA competition record (archived))	1978	
Jürgen Kohler	West Germany	1	**1990**	1994, 1998	(Note: Juergen KOHLER – FIFA competition record (archived))	1965	
Werner Kohlmeyer	West Germany	1	**1954**		(Note: Werner KOHLMEYER – FIFA competition record (archived))	1924	1974
Andreas Köpke	West Germany	1	1990	1994, 1998	(Note: Andreas KOEPKE – FIFA competition record (archived))	1962	
Christoph Kramer	Germany	1	**2014**		(Note: Christoph KRAMER – FIFA competition record (archived))	1991	
Helmut Kremers	West Germany	1	1974		(Note: Helmut KREMERS – FIFA competition record (archived))	1949	
Toni Kroos	Germany	1	**2014**	2010, 2018	(Note: Toni KROOS – FIFA competition record (archived))	1990	
Heinz Kubsch	West Germany	1	1954		(Note: Heinz KUBSCH – FIFA competition record (archived))	1930	1993
Heinz Kwiatkowski	West Germany	1	1954	1958	(Note: Heinz KWIATKOWSKI – FIFA competition record (archived))	1926	2008
Ricardo La Volpe	Argentina	1	1978		(Note: Ricardo LA VOLPE – FIFA competition record (archived))	1952	
Fritz Laband	West Germany	1	1954		(Note: Fritz LABAND – FIFA competition record (archived))	1925	1982
Philipp Lahm	Germany	1	**2014**	2006, 2010	(Note: Philipp LAHM – FIFA competition record (archived))	1983	
Bernard Lama	France	1	1998		(Note: Bernard LAMA – FIFA competition record (archived))	1963	
Lamine Yamal	Spain	1	**2026**			2007	
Aymeric Laporte	Spain	1	**2026**	2022		1994	
Omar Larrosa	Argentina	1	**1978**		(Note: Omar LARROSA – FIFA competition record (archived))	1947	
Leão	Brazil	1	1970	1974, 1978, 1986	(Note: LEAO – FIFA competition record (archived))	1949	
Frank Leboeuf	France	1	**1998**	2002	(Note: Frank LEBOEUF – FIFA competition record (archived))	1968	
Thomas Lemar	France	1	2018		(Note: Thomas LEMAR – FIFA competition record (archived))	1995	
Leonardo	Brazil	1	1994	1998	(Note: LEONARDO – FIFA competition record (archived))	1969	
Werner Liebrich	West Germany	1	**1954**		(Note: Werner LIEBRICH – FIFA competition record (archived))	1927	1995
Pierre Littbarski	West Germany	1	**1990**	1982, 1986	(Note: Pierre LITTBARSKI – FIFA competition record (archived))	1960	
Bixente Lizarazu	France	1	**1998**	2002	(Note: Bixente LIZARAZU – FIFA competition record (archived))	1969	
Fernando Llorente	Spain	1	2010		(Note: Fernando LLORENTE – FIFA competition record (archived))	1985	
Marcos Llorente	Spain	1	2026	2022		1995	
Hugo Lloris	France	1	**2018**	2010, 2014, 2022	(Note: Hugo LLORIS – FIFA competition record (archived))	1986	
Ugo Locatelli	Italy	1	**1938**		(Note: Ugo LOCATELLI – FIFA competition record (archived))	1916	1993
Lúcio	Brazil	1	**2002**	2006, 2010	(Note: LUCIO – FIFA competition record (archived))	1978	
Luizão	Brazil	1	2002		(Note: LUIZAO – FIFA competition record (archived))	1975	
Leopoldo Luque	Argentina	1	**1978**		(Note: Leopoldo LUQUE – FIFA competition record (archived))	1949	2021
Alexis Mac Allister	Argentina	1	**2022**	2026		1998	
Karl Mai	West Germany	1	**1954**		(Note: Karl MAI – FIFA competition record (archived))	1928	1993
Sepp Maier	West Germany	1	**1974**	1966, 1970, 1978	(Note: Sepp MAIER – FIFA competition record (archived))	1944	
Steve Mandanda	France	1	2018	2010, 2022	(Note: Steve MANDANDA – FIFA competition record (archived))	1985	
Diego Maradona	Argentina	1	**1986**	1982, 1990, 1994	(Note: Diego MARADONA – FIFA competition record (archived))	1960	2020
Carlos Marchena	Spain	1	2010	2006	(Note: Carlos MARCHENA – FIFA competition record (archived))	1979	
Márcio Santos	Brazil	1	**1994**		(Note: MARCIO SANTOS – FIFA competition record (archived))	1969	
Marco Antônio	Brazil	1	1970	1974	(Note: MARCO ANTONIO – FIFA competition record (archived))	1951	
Marcos	Brazil	1	**2002**		(Note: MARCOS – FIFA competition record (archived))	1973	
Gianpiero Marini	Italy	1	1982		(Note: Giampiero MARINI – FIFA competition record (archived))	1951	
Emiliano Martínez	Argentina	1	**2022**	2026		1992	
Javi Martínez	Spain	1	2010	2014	(Note: Javi MARTINEZ – FIFA competition record (archived))	1988	
Lautaro Martínez	Argentina	1	**2022**	2026		1997	
Lisandro Martínez	Argentina	1	2022	2026		1998	
William Martínez	Uruguay	1	1950	1954, 1962	(Note: William MARTINEZ – FIFA competition record (archived))	1928	1997
Ernesto Mascheroni	Uruguay	1	**1930**		(Note: Ernesto MASCHERONI – FIFA competition record (archived))	1907	1984
Roque Máspoli	Uruguay	1	**1950**	1954	(Note: Roque MASPOLI – FIFA competition record (archived))	1917	2004
Daniele Massaro	Italy	1	1982	1994	(Note: Daniele MASSARO – FIFA competition record (archived))	1961	
Juan Mata	Spain	1	2010	2014	(Note: Juan MATA – FIFA competition record (archived))	1988	
Marco Materazzi	Italy	1	**2006**	2002	(Note: Marco MATERAZZI – FIFA competition record (archived))	1973	
Lothar Matthäus	West Germany	1	**1990**	1982, 1986, 1994, 1998	(Note: Lothar MATTHAEUS – FIFA competition record (archived))	1961	
Blaise Matuidi	France	1	**2018**	2014	(Note: Blaise MATUIDI – FIFA competition record (archived))	1987	
Mauro Silva	Brazil	1	**1994**		(Note: MAURO SILVA – FIFA competition record (archived))	1968	
Mazinho	Brazil	1	**1994**	1990	(Note: MAZINHO – FIFA competition record (archived))	1966	
Kylian Mbappé	France	1	**2018**	2022, 2026	(Note: Kylian MBAPPE – FIFA competition record (archived))	1998	
Paul Mebus	West Germany	1	1954		(Note: Paul MEBUS – FIFA competition record (archived))	1920	1993
Ángel Melogno	Uruguay	1	1930		(Note: Angel MELOGNO – FIFA competition record (archived))	1905	1945
Benjamin Mendy	France	1	2018		(Note: Benjamin MENDY – FIFA competition record (archived))	1994	
Mengálvio	Brazil	1	1962		(Note: MENGALVIO – FIFA competition record (archived))	1939	
Mikel Merino	Spain	1	**2026**			1996	
Per Mertesacker	Germany	1	**2014**	2006, 2010	(Note: Per MERTESACKER – FIFA competition record (archived))	1984	
Lionel Messi	Argentina	1	**2022**	2006, 2010, 2014, 2018, 2026	(Note: Lionel MESSI – FIFA competition record (archived))	1987	
Karl-Heinz Metzner	West Germany	1	1954		(Note: Karl-Heinz METZNER – FIFA competition record (archived))	1923	1994
Óscar Míguez	Uruguay	1	**1950**	1954	(Note: Oscar MIGUEZ – FIFA competition record (archived))	1927	2006
Frank Mill	West Germany	1	1990		(Note: Frank MILL – FIFA competition record (archived))	1958	2025
Moacir	Brazil	1	1958		(Note: MOACIR – FIFA competition record (archived))	1936	
Nahuel Molina	Argentina	1	**2022**	2026		1998	
Andreas Möller	West Germany	1	1990	1994, 1998	(Note: Andreas MOELLER – FIFA competition record (archived))	1967	
Luis Monti	Italy	1	**1934**	1930 (for Argentina)	(Note: Luis MONTI – FIFA competition record (archived))	1901	1983
Gonzalo Montiel	Argentina	1	**2022**	2026		1997	
Bobby Moore	England	1	**1966**	1962, 1970	(Note: Bobby MOORE – FIFA competition record (archived))	1941	1993
Rubén Morán	Uruguay	1	**1950**		(Note: Ruben MORAN – FIFA competition record (archived))	1930	1978
Max Morlock	West Germany	1	**1954**		(Note: Max MORLOCK – FIFA competition record (archived))	1925	1994
Müller	Brazil	1	1994	1986, 1990	(Note: MULLER – FIFA competition record (archived))	1966	
Gerd Müller	West Germany	1	**1974**	1970	(Note: Gerd MUELLER – FIFA competition record (archived))	1945	2021
Thomas Müller	Germany	1	**2014**	2010, 2018, 2022	(Note: Thomas MUELLER – FIFA competition record (archived))	1989	
Víctor Muñoz	Spain	1	2026			2003	
Shkodran Mustafi	Germany	1	2014		(Note: Shkodran MUSTAFI – FIFA competition record (archived))	1992	
José Nasazzi	Uruguay	1	**1930**		(Note: Jose NASAZZI – FIFA competition record (archived))	1901	1968
Jesús Navas	Spain	1	**2010**		(Note: Jesús NAVAS – FIFA competition record (archived))	1985	
Alessandro Nesta	Italy	1	2006	1998, 2002	(Note: Alessandro NESTA – FIFA competition record (archived))	1976	
Günter Netzer	West Germany	1	1974		(Note: Guenter NETZER – FIFA competition record (archived))	1944	
Manuel Neuer	Germany	1	**2014**	2010, 2018, 2022, 2026	(Note: Manuel NEUER – FIFA competition record (archived))	1986	
Norbert Nigbur	West Germany	1	1974		(Note: Norbert NIGBUR – FIFA competition record (archived))	1948	
Steven Nzonzi	France	1	**2018**		(Note: Steven NZONZI – FIFA competition record (archived))	1988	
Massimo Oddo	Italy	1	2006		(Note: Massimo ODDO – FIFA competition record (archived))	1976	
Julio Olarticoechea	Argentina	1	**1986**	1982, 1990	(Note: Julio OLARTICOECHEA – FIFA competition record (archived))	1958	
Jorge Olguín	Argentina	1	**1978**	1982	(Note: Jorge OLGUIN – FIFA competition record (archived))	1952	
Aldo Olivieri	Italy	1	**1938**		(Note: Aldo OLIVIERI – FIFA competition record (archived))	1910	2001
Renato Olmi	Italy	1	1938		(Note: Renato OLMI – FIFA competition record (archived))	1914	1985
Dani Olmo	Spain	1	**2026**	2022		1998	
Oreco	Brazil	1	1958		(Note: ORECO – FIFA competition record (archived))	1932	1985
Gabriele Oriali	Italy	1	**1982**		(Note: Gabriele ORIALI – FIFA competition record (archived))	1952	
Orlando	Brazil	1	**1958**	1966	(Note: ORLANDO – FIFA competition record (archived))	1935	2010
Raimundo Orsi	Italy	1	**1934**		(Note: Raimundo ORSI – FIFA competition record (archived))	1901	1986
Oscar Ortiz	Argentina	1	**1978**		(Note: Oscar ORTIZ – FIFA competition record (archived))	1953	
Washington Ortuño	Uruguay	1	1950		(Note: Washington ORTUNO – FIFA competition record (archived))	1928	1973
Nicolás Otamendi	Argentina	1	**2022**	2010, 2018, 2026	(Note: Nicolas OTAMENDI – FIFA competition record (archived))	1988	
Wolfgang Overath	West Germany	1	**1974**	1966, 1970	(Note: Wolfgang OVERATH – FIFA competition record (archived))	1943	
Miguel Oviedo	Argentina	1	1978		(Note: Miguel OVIEDO – FIFA competition record (archived))	1950	
Mikel Oyarzabal	Spain	1	**2026**			1997	
Mesut Özil	Germany	1	**2014**	2010, 2018	(Note: Mesut OEZIL – FIFA competition record (archived))	1988	
Rubén Pagnanini	Argentina	1	1978		(Note: Ruben PAGNANINI – FIFA competition record (archived))	1949	
Exequiel Palacios	Argentina	1	2022	2026		1998	
Terry Paine	England	1	1966		(Note: Terry PAINE – FIFA competition record (archived))	1939	
Leandro Paredes	Argentina	1	**2022**	2026		1994	
Pedro Pasculli	Argentina	1	1986		(Note: Pedro PASCULLI – FIFA competition record (archived))	1960	
Piero Pasinati	Italy	1	1938		(Note: Piero PASINATI – FIFA competition record (archived))	1910	2000
Paulo Sérgio	Brazil	1	1994		(Note: PAULO SERGIO – FIFA competition record (archived))	1969	
Benjamin Pavard	France	1	**2018**	2022	(Note: Benjamin PAVARD – FIFA competition record (archived))	1996	
Aníbal Paz	Uruguay	1	1950		(Note: Anibal PAZ – FIFA competition record (archived))	1917	2013
Pedri	Spain	1	**2026**	2022		2002	
Pedro	Spain	1	**2010**	2014	(Note: PEDRO – FIFA competition record (archived))	1987	
Mario Perazzolo	Italy	1	1938		(Note: Mario PERAZZOLO – FIFA competition record (archived))	1911	2001
Julio Pérez	Uruguay	1	**1950**	1954	(Note: Julio PEREZ – FIFA competition record (archived))	1926	2002
Simone Perrotta	Italy	1	**2006**		(Note: Simone PERROTTA – FIFA competition record (archived))	1977	
Angelo Peruzzi	Italy	1	2006		(Note: Angelo PERUZZI – FIFA competition record (archived))	1970	
Martin Peters	England	1	**1966**	1970	(Note: Martin PETERS – FIFA competition record (archived))	1943	2019
Emmanuel Petit	France	1	**1998**	2002	(Note: Emmanuel PETIT – FIFA competition record (archived))	1970	
Pedro Petrone	Uruguay	1	1930		(Note: Pedro PETRONE – FIFA competition record (archived))	1905	1964
Germán Pezzella	Argentina	1	**2022**			1991	
Alfred Pfaff	West Germany	1	1954		(Note: Alfred PFAFF – FIFA competition record (archived))	1926	2008
Hans Pflügler	West Germany	1	1990		(Note: Hans PFLUEGLER – FIFA competition record (archived))	1960	
Piazza	Brazil	1	**1970**	1974	(Note: WILSON PIAZZA – FIFA competition record (archived))	1943	
Rodolfo Pini	Uruguay	1	1950		(Note: Rodolfo PINI – FIFA competition record (archived))	1926	2000
Yéremy Pino	Spain	1	2026	2022		2002	
Silvio Piola	Italy	1	**1938**		(Note: Silvio PIOLA – FIFA competition record (archived))	1913	1996
Gerard Piqué	Spain	1	**2010**	2014, 2018	(Note: Gerard PIQUE – FIFA competition record (archived))	1987	
Robert Pires	France	1	1998		(Note: Robert PIRES – FIFA competition record (archived))	1973	
Conduelo Píriz	Uruguay	1	1930		(Note: Conduelo PIRIZ – FIFA competition record (archived))	1905	1976
Andrea Pirlo	Italy	1	**2006**	2010, 2014	(Note: Andrea PIRLO – FIFA competition record (archived))	1979	
Mario Pizziolo	Italy	1	1934		(Note: Mario PIZZIOLO – FIFA competition record (archived))	1909	1990
Lukas Podolski	Germany	1	2014	2006, 2010	(Note: Lukas PODOLSKI – FIFA competition record (archived))	1985	
Paul Pogba	France	1	**2018**	2014	(Note: Paul POGBA – FIFA competition record (archived))	1993	
Pedro Porro	Spain	1	**2026**			1999	
Josef Posipal	West Germany	1	**1954**		(Note: Jupp POSIPAL – FIFA competition record (archived))	1927	1997
Marc Pubill	Spain	1	2026			2003	
Nery Pumpido	Argentina	1	**1986**	1982, 1990	(Note: Nery PUMPIDO – FIFA competition record (archived))	1957	
Carles Puyol	Spain	1	**2010**	2002, 2006	(Note: Carles PUYOL – FIFA competition record (archived))	1978	
Helmut Rahn	West Germany	1	**1954**	1958	(Note: Helmut RAHN – FIFA competition record (archived))	1929	2003
Raí	Brazil	1	1994		(Note: RAI – FIFA competition record (archived))	1965	
Adil Rami	France	1	2018		(Note: Adil RAMI – FIFA competition record (archived))	1985	
Sergio Ramos	Spain	1	**2010**	2006, 2014, 2018	(Note: Sergio RAMOS – FIFA competition record (archived))	1986	
Pietro Rava	Italy	1	**1938**		(Note: Pietro RAVA – FIFA competition record (archived))	1916	2006
David Raya	Spain	1	2026	2022		1995	
Emilio Recoba	Uruguay	1	1930		(Note: Emilio RECOBA – FIFA competition record (archived))	1904	1992
Pepe Reina	Spain	1	2010	2006, 2014, 2018	(Note: Pepe REINA – FIFA competition record (archived))	1982	
Stefan Reuter	West Germany	1	**1990**	1998	(Note: Stefan REUTER – FIFA competition record (archived))	1966	
Ricardinho	Brazil	1	2002	2006	(Note: RICARDINHO – FIFA competition record (archived))	1976	
Ricardo Rocha	Brazil	1	1994	1990	(Note: RICARDO ROCHA – FIFA competition record (archived))	1962	
Karl-Heinz Riedle	West Germany	1	1990	1994	(Note: Karlheinz RIEDLE – FIFA competition record (archived))	1965	
Luis Rijo	Uruguay	1	1950		(Note: Luis RIJO – FIFA competition record (archived))	1927	2001
Carlos Riolfo	Uruguay	1	1930		(Note: Carlos RIOLFO – FIFA competition record (archived))	1905	1978
Rivaldo	Brazil	1	**2002**	1998	(Note: RIVALDO – FIFA competition record (archived))	1972	
Rivellino	Brazil	1	**1970**	1974, 1978	(Note: RIVELINO – FIFA competition record (archived))	1946	
Roberto	Brazil	1	1970		(Note: ROBERTO – FIFA competition record (archived))	1943	
Roberto Carlos	Brazil	1	**2002**	1998, 2006	(Note: ROBERTO CARLOS – FIFA competition record (archived))	1973	
Rodri	Spain	1	**2026**	2022		1996	
Guido Rodríguez	Argentina	1	2022			1994	
Víctor Rodríguez Andrade	Uruguay	1	**1950**	1954	(Note: Victor RODRIGUEZ ANDRADE – FIFA competition record (archived))	1927	1985
Rogério Ceni	Brazil	1	2002	2006	(Note: ROGERIO CENI – FIFA competition record (archived))	1973	
Romário	Brazil	1	**1994**	1990	(Note: ROMÁRIO (Romário de Souza Faria) – FIFA competition record (archived))	1966	
Carlos Romero	Uruguay	1	1950		(Note: Carlos ROMERO – FIFA competition record (archived))	1927	1999
Cristian Romero	Argentina	1	**2022**	2026		1998	
Ronaldão	Brazil	1	1994		(Note: RONALDAO – FIFA competition record (archived))	1965	
Ronaldinho	Brazil	1	**2002**	2006	(Note: RONALDINHO – FIFA competition record (archived))	1980	
Roque Júnior	Brazil	1	**2002**		(Note: ROQUE JUNIOR – FIFA competition record (archived))	1976	
Virginio Rosetta	Italy	1	1934		(Note: Virginio ROSETTA – FIFA competition record (archived))	1902	1975
Paolo Rossi	Italy	1	**1982**	1978, 1986	(Note: Paolo ROSSI – FIFA competition record (archived))	1956	2020
Oscar Ruggeri	Argentina	1	**1986**	1990, 1994	(Note: Oscar RUGGERI – FIFA competition record (archived))	1962	
Fabián Ruiz	Spain	1	**2026**			1996	
Gerónimo Rulli	Argentina	1	2022	2026		1992	
Zoilo Saldombide	Uruguay	1	1930		(Note: Zoilo SALDOMBIDE – FIFA competition record (archived))	1903	1981
Héctor Scarone	Uruguay	1	**1930**		(Note: Hector SCARONE – FIFA competition record (archived))	1898	1967
Hans Schäfer	West Germany	1	**1954**	1958, 1962	(Note: Hans SCHAEFER – FIFA competition record (archived))	1927	2017
Juan Alberto Schiaffino	Uruguay	1	**1950**	1954	(Note: Juan SCHIAFFINO – FIFA competition record (archived))	1925	2002
Angelo Schiavio	Italy	1	**1934**		(Note: Angelo SCHIAVIO – FIFA competition record (archived))	1905	1990
André Schürrle	Germany	1	**2014**		(Note: Andre SCHUERRLE – FIFA competition record (archived))	1990	
Hans-Georg Schwarzenbeck	West Germany	1	**1974**	1978	(Note: Hans Georg SCHWARZENBECK – FIFA competition record (archived))	1948	
Bastian Schweinsteiger	Germany	1	**2014**	2006, 2010	(Note: Bastian SCHWEINSTEIGER – FIFA competition record (archived))	1984	
Gaetano Scirea	Italy	1	**1982**	1978, 1986	(Note: Gaetano SCIREA – FIFA competition record (archived))	1953	1989
Franco Selvaggi	Italy	1	1982		(Note: Franco SELVAGGI – FIFA competition record (archived))	1953	
Pietro Serantoni	Italy	1	**1938**		(Note: Pietro SERANTONI – FIFA competition record (archived))	1906	1964
Djibril Sidibé	France	1	2018		(Note: Djibril SIDIBE – FIFA competition record (archived))	1992	
David Silva	Spain	1	2010	2014, 2018	(Note: David SILVA – FIFA competition record (archived))	1986	
Unai Simón	Spain	1	**2026**	2022		1997	
Ron Springett	England	1	1966	1962	(Note: Ron SPRINGETT – FIFA competition record (archived))	1935	2015
Paul Steiner	West Germany	1	1990		(Note: Paul STEINER – FIFA competition record (archived))	1957	
Nobby Stiles	England	1	**1966**	1970	(Note: Nobby STILES – FIFA competition record (archived))	1942	2020
Cláudio Taffarel	Brazil	1	**1994**	1990, 1998	(Note: TAFFAREL – FIFA competition record (archived))	1966	
Nicolás Tagliafico	Argentina	1	**2022**	2018, 2026	(Note: Nicolas TAGLIAFICO – FIFA competition record (archived))	1992	
Carlos Tapia	Argentina	1	1986		(Note: Carlos TAPIA – FIFA competition record (archived))	1962	
Alberto Tarantini	Argentina	1	**1978**	1982	(Note: Alberto TARANTINI – FIFA competition record (archived))	1955	
Marco Tardelli	Italy	1	**1982**	1978, 1986	(Note: Marco TARDELLI – FIFA competition record (archived))	1954	
Domingo Tejera	Uruguay	1	1930		(Note: Domingo TEJERA – FIFA competition record (archived))	1899	1969
Eusebio Tejera	Uruguay	1	**1950**	1954	(Note: Eusebio TEJERA – FIFA competition record (archived))	1922	2002
Florian Thauvin	France	1	2018		(Note: Florian THAUVIN – FIFA competition record (archived))	1993	
Olaf Thon	West Germany	1	1990	1986, 1998	(Note: Olaf THON – FIFA competition record (archived))	1966	
Lilian Thuram	France	1	**1998**	2002, 2006	(Note: Lilian THURAM – FIFA competition record (archived))	1972	
Corentin Tolisso	France	1	**2018**		(Note: Corentin TOLISSO – FIFA competition record (archived))	1994	
Luca Toni	Italy	1	**2006**		(Note: Luca Toni – FIFA competition record (archived))	1977	
Fernando Torres	Spain	1	**2010**	2006, 2014	(Note: Fernando TORRES – FIFA competition record (archived))	1984	
Ferran Torres	Spain	1	**2026**	2022		2000	
Tostão	Brazil	1	**1970**	1966	(Note: TOSTAO – FIFA competition record (archived))	1947	
Francesco Totti	Italy	1	**2006**	2002	(Note: Francesco TOTTI – FIFA competition record (archived))	1976	
David Trezeguet	France	1	1998	2002, 2006	(Note: David TREZEGUET – FIFA competition record (archived))	1977	
Marcelo Trobbiani	Argentina	1	**1986**		(Note: Marcelo TROBBIANI – FIFA competition record (archived))	1955	
Toni Turek	West Germany	1	**1954**		(Note: Toni TUREK – FIFA competition record (archived))	1919	1984
Samuel Umtiti	France	1	**2018**		(Note: Samuel UMTITI – FIFA competition record (archived))	1993	
Santos Urdinarán	Uruguay	1	1930		(Note: Santos URDINARAN – FIFA competition record (archived))	1900	1979
Jorge Valdano	Argentina	1	**1986**	1982	(Note: Jorge VALDANO – FIFA competition record (archived))	1955	
Víctor Valdés	Spain	1	2010		(Note: Víctor VALDÉS – FIFA competition record (archived))	1982	
José Daniel Valencia	Argentina	1	1978	1982	(Note: Jose VALENCIA – FIFA competition record (archived))	1955	
Vampeta	Brazil	1	2002		(Note: VAMPETA – FIFA competition record (archived))	1974	
Raphaël Varane	France	1	**2018**	2014, 2022	(Note: Raphael VARANE – FIFA competition record (archived))	1993	
Obdulio Varela	Uruguay	1	**1950**	1954	(Note: Obdulio VARELA – FIFA competition record (archived))	1917	1996
Mario Varglien	Italy	1	1934		(Note: Mario VARGLIEN – FIFA competition record (archived))	1905	1978
Ernesto Vidal	Uruguay	1	1950		(Note: Ernesto VIDAL – FIFA competition record (archived))	1921	1974
Patrick Vieira	France	1	**1998**	2002, 2006	(Note: Patrick VIEIRA – FIFA competition record (archived))	1976	
Pietro Vierchowod	Italy	1	1982	1986, 1990	(Note: Pietro VIERCHOWOD – FIFA competition record (archived))	1959	
Héctor Vilches	Uruguay	1	1950		(Note: Hector VILCHES – FIFA competition record (archived))	1926	1998
David Villa	Spain	1	**2010**	2006, 2014	(Note: David Villa – FIFA competition record (archived))	1981	
Ricardo Villa	Argentina	1	1978		(Note: Ricardo VILLA – FIFA competition record (archived))	1952	
Viola	Brazil	1	**1994**		(Note: VIOLA – FIFA competition record (archived))	1969	
Berti Vogts	West Germany	1	**1974**	1970, 1978	(Note: Berti VOGTS – FIFA competition record (archived))	1946	
Rudi Völler	West Germany	1	**1990**	1986, 1994	(Note: Rudi VOELLER – FIFA competition record (archived))	1960	
Fritz Walter	West Germany	1	**1954**	1958	(Note: Fritz WALTER – FIFA competition record (archived))	1920	2002
Ottmar Walter	West Germany	1	**1954**		(Note: Ottmar WALTER – FIFA competition record (archived))	1924	2013
Roman Weidenfeller	Germany	1	2014		(Note: Roman WEIDENFELLER – FIFA competition record (archived))	1980	
Nico Williams	Spain	1	**2026**	2022		2002	
Ray Wilson	England	1	**1966**	1962	(Note: Ray WILSON – FIFA competition record (archived))	1934	2018
Herbert Wimmer	West Germany	1	1974		(Note: Herbert WIMMER – FIFA competition record (archived))	1944	
Xavi	Spain	1	**2010**	2002, 2006, 2014	(Note: Xavi HERNANDEZ – FIFA competition record (archived))	1980	
Cristian Zaccardo	Italy	1	2006		(Note: Cristian Zaccardo – FIFA competition record (archived))	1981	
Gianluca Zambrotta	Italy	1	**2006**	2002, 2010	(Note: Gianluca ZAMBROTTA – FIFA competition record (archived))	1977	
Zé Maria	Brazil	1	1970	1974	(Note: ZE MARIA – FIFA competition record (archived))	1949	
Héctor Zelada	Argentina	1	1986		(Note: Hector ZELADA – FIFA competition record (archived))	1957	
Zequinha	Brazil	1	1962		(Note: ZEQUINHA – FIFA competition record (archived))	1934	2009
Zetti	Brazil	1	1994		(Note: ZETTI – FIFA competition record (archived))	1965	
Zinedine Zidane	France	1	**1998**	2002, 2006	(Note: Zinedine ZIDANE – FIFA competition record (archived))	1972	
Ron-Robert Zieler	Germany	1	2014		(Note: Ron-Robert ZIELER – FIFA competition record (archived))	1989	
Zinho	Brazil	1	**1994**		(Note: ZINHO – FIFA competition record (archived))	1967	
Dino Zoff	Italy	1	**1982**	1970, 1974, 1978	(Note: Dino ZOFF – FIFA competition record (archived))	1942	
Martín Zubimendi	Spain	1	**2026**			1999	

== By year ==
In the below table, players highlighted in bold appeared in the respective final matches, while players highlighted in italics were unused squad members in the respective tournaments.

Squads of teams that won the World Cup
Year	Team	Squad	Manager (Note: For a detailed list, see List of FIFA World Cup winning managers.)	Ref.
1930	Uruguay (detailed squad)	1 **J. Andrade** • 2 P. Anselmo • 3 **E. Ballestrero** • 4 J. Calvo • 5 M. Capuccini • 6 **H. Castro** • 7 **P. Cea** • 8 **P. Dorado** • 9 **L. Fernández** • 10 **Á. Gestido** • 11 **S. Iriarte** • 12 **E. Mascheroni** • 13 Á. Melogno • 14 **J. Nasazzi** • 15 P. Petrone • 16 C. Píriz • 17 E. Recoba • 18 C. Riolfo • 19 Z. Saldombide • 20 **H. Scarone** • 21 D. Tejera • 22 S. Urdinarán	(Uruguay) A. Suppici	
1934	Italy (detailed squad)	1 **L. Allemandi** • 2 P. Arcari • 3 **L. Bertolini** • 4 F. Borel • 5 U. Caligaris • 6 A. Castellazzi • 7 G. Cavanna • 8 **G. Combi** • 9 A. Demaría • 10 **G. Ferrari** • 11 **A. Ferraris** • 12 **E. Guaita** • 13 A. Guarisi • 14 G. Masetti • 15 **G. Meazza** • 16 **L. Monti** • 17 **E. Monzeglio** • 18 **R. Orsi** • 19 M. Pizziolo • 20 V. Rosetta • 21 **A. Schiavio** • 22 M. Varglien	(Italy) V. Pozzo	
1938	Italy (detailed squad)	1 **M. Andreolo** • 2 S. Bertoni • 3 **A. Biavati** • 4 C. Ceresoli • 5 B. Chizzo • 6 **G. Colaussi** • 7 A. Donati • 8 **G. Ferrari** • 9 P. Ferraris • 10 **A. Foni** • 11 M. Genta • 12 **U. Locatelli** • 13 G. Masetti • 14 **G. Meazza** • 15 E. Monzeglio • 16 **A. Olivieri** • 17 R. Olmi • 18 P. Pasinati • 19 M. Perazzolo • 20 **S. Piola** • 21 **P. Rava** • 22 **P. Serantoni**	(Italy) V. Pozzo	
1950	Uruguay (detailed squad)	1 J. Britos • 2 J. Burgueño • 3 **S. Gambetta** • 4 **A. Ghiggia** • 5 J. González • 6 **M. González** • 7 W. Martínez • 8 **R. Máspoli** • 9 **Ó. Míguez** • 10 **R. Morán** • 11 W. Ortuño • 12 A. Paz • 13 **J. Pérez** • 14 R. Pini • 15 L. Rijo • 16 **V. Rodríguez Andrade** • 17 C. Romero • 18 **J. Schiaffino** • 19 **E. Tejera** • 20 **O. Varela** • 21 E. Vidal • 22 H. Vilches	(Uruguay) J. López	
1954	West Germany (detailed squad)	1 **T. Turek** • 2 F. Laband • 3 **W. Kohlmeyer** • 4 H. Bauer • 5 H. Erhardt • 6 **H. Eckel** • 7 **J. Posipal** • 8 **K. Mai** • 9 P. Mebus • 10 **W. Liebrich** • 11 K.-H. Metzner • 12 **H. Rahn** • 13 **M. Morlock** • 14 B. Klodt • 15 **O. Walter** • 16 **F. Walter** • 17 R. Herrmann • 18 U. Biesinger • 19 A. Pfaff • 20 **H. Schäfer** • 21 H. Kubsch • 22 H. Kwiatkowski	(Germany) S. Herberger	
1958	Brazil (detailed squad)	1 Castilho • 2 **Bellini** • 3 **Gilmar** • 4 **Djalma Santos** • 5 Dino Sani • 6 **Didi** • 7 **M. Zagallo** • 8 Oreco • 9 Zózimo • 10 **Pelé** • 11 **Garrincha** • 12 **Nílton Santos** • 13 Moacir • 14 De Sordi • 15 **Orlando** • 16 Mauro • 17 Joel • 18 J. Altafini • 19 **Zito** • 20 **Vavá** • 21 Dida • 22 Pepe	(Brazil) V. Feola	
1962	Brazil (detailed squad)	1 **Gilmar** • 2 **Djalma Santos** • 3 **Mauro** • 4 **Zito** • 5 **Zózimo** • 6 **Nílton Santos** • 7 **Garrincha** • 8 **Didi** • 9 Coutinho • 10 Pelé • 11 Pepe • 12 Jair Marinho • 13 Bellini • 14 Jurandir • 15 Altair • 16 Zequinha • 17 Mengálvio • 18 Jair • 19 **Vavá** • 20 **Amarildo** • 21 **M. Zagallo** • 22 Castilho	(Brazil) A. Moreira	
1966	England (detailed squad)	1 **G. Banks** • 2 **G. Cohen** • 3 **R. Wilson** • 4 **N. Stiles** • 5 **J. Charlton** • 6 **B. Moore** • 7 **A. Ball** • 8 J. Greaves • 9 **B. Charlton** • 10 **G. Hurst** • 11 J. Connelly • 12 R. Springett • 13 P. Bonetti • 14 J. Armfield • 15 G. Byrne • 16 **M. Peters** • 17 R. Flowers • 18 N. Hunter • 19 T. Paine • 20 I. Callaghan • 21 **R. Hunt** • 22 G. Eastham	(England) A. Ramsey	
1970	Brazil (detailed squad)	1 **Félix** • 2 **Brito** • 3 **Piazza** • 4 **Carlos Alberto** • 5 **Clodoaldo** • 6 Marco Antônio • 7 **Jairzinho** • 8 **Gérson** • 9 **Tostão** • 10 **Pelé** • 11 **Rivellino** • 12 Ado • 13 Roberto • 14 Baldocchi • 15 Fontana • 16 **Everaldo** • 17 Joel • 18 Caju • 19 Edu • 20 Dario • 21 Zé Maria • 22 Leão	(Brazil) M. Zagallo	
1974	West Germany (detailed squad)	1 **S. Maier** • 2 **B. Vogts** • 3 **P. Breitner** • 4 **H.-G. Schwarzenbeck** • 5 **F. Beckenbauer** • 6 H.-D. Höttges • 7 H. Wimmer • 8 B. Cullmann • 9 **J. Grabowski** • 10 G. Netzer • 11 J. Heynckes • 12 **W. Overath** • 13 **G. Müller** • 14 **U. Hoeneß** • 15 H. Flohe • 16 **R. Bonhof** • 17 **B. Hölzenbein** • 18 D. Herzog • 19 J. Kapellmann • 20 H. Kremers • 21 N. Nigbur • 22 W. Kleff	(Germany) H. Schön	
1978	Argentina (detailed squad)	1 N. Alonso • 2 **O. Ardiles** • 3 H. Baley • 4 **D. Bertoni** • 5 **U. Fillol** • 6 **A. Gallego** • 7 **L. Galván** • 8 R. Galván • 9 **R. Houseman** • 10 **M. Kempes** • 11 D. Killer • 12 **O. Larrosa** • 13 R. La Volpe • 14 **L. Luque** • 15 **J. Olguín** • 16 **O. Ortiz** • 17 M. Oviedo • 18 R. Pagnanini • 19 **D. Passarella** • 20 **A. Tarantini** • 21 J. Valencia • 22 R. Villa	(Argentina) C. Menotti	
1982	Italy (detailed squad)	1 **D. Zoff** • 2 F. Baresi • 3 **G. Bergomi** • 4 **A. Cabrini** • 5 **F. Collovati** • 6 **C. Gentile** • 7 **G. Scirea** • 8 P. Vierchowod • 9 G. Antognoni • 10 G. Dossena • 11 G. Marini • 12 I. Bordon • 13 **G. Oriali** • 14 **M. Tardelli** • 15 **F. Causio** • 16 **B. Conti** • 17 D. Massaro • 18 **A. Altobelli** • 19 **F. Graziani** • 20 **P. Rossi** • 21 F. Selvaggi • 22 G. Galli	(Italy) E. Bearzot	
1986	Argentina (detailed squad)	1 S. Almirón • 2 **S. Batista** • 3 R. Bochini • 4 C. Borghi • 5 **J. Brown** • 6 D. Passarella • 7 **J. Burruchaga** • 8 N. Clausen • 9 **J. Cuciuffo** • 10 **D. Maradona** • 11 **J. Valdano** • 12 **H. Enrique** • 13 O. Garré • 14 **R. Giusti** • 15 L. Islas • 16 **J. Olarticoechea** • 17 P. Pasculli • 18 **N. Pumpido** • 19 **O. Ruggeri** • 20 C. Tapia • 21 **M. Trobbiani** • 22 H. Zelada	(Argentina) C. Bilardo	
1990	West Germany (detailed squad)	1 **B. Illgner** • 2 **S. Reuter** • 3 **A. Brehme** • 4 **J. Kohler** • 5 **K. Augenthaler** • 6 **G. Buchwald** • 7 **P. Littbarski** • 8 **T. Häßler** • 9 **R. Völler** • 10 **L. Matthäus** • 11 F. Mill • 12 R. Aumann • 13 K.-H. Riedle • 14 **T. Berthold** • 15 U. Bein • 16 P. Steiner • 17 A. Möller • 18 **J. Klinsmann** • 19 H. Pflügler • 20 O. Thon • 21 G. Hermann • 22 A. Köpke	(Germany) F. Beckenbauer	
1994	Brazil (detailed squad)	1 **Taffarel** • 2 **Jorginho** • 3 Ricardo Rocha • 4 Ronaldão • 5 **Mauro Silva** • 6 **Branco** • 7 **Bebeto** • 8 **Dunga** • 9 **Zinho** • 10 Raí • 11 **Romário** • 12 Zetti • 13 **Aldair** • 14 **Cafu** • 15 **Márcio Santos** • 16 Leonardo • 17 **Mazinho** • 18 Paulo Sérgio • 19 Müller • 20 Ronaldo • 21 **Viola** • 22 Gilmar	(Brazil) C. Parreira	
1998	France (detailed squad)	1 B. Lama • 2 V. Candela • 3 **B. Lizarazu** • 4 **P. Vieira** • 5 L. Blanc • 6 **Y. Djorkaeff** • 7 **D. Deschamps** • 8 **M. Desailly** • 9 **S. Guivarc'h** • 10 **Z. Zidane** • 11 R. Pires • 12 T. Henry • 13 B. Diomède • 14 **A. Boghossian** • 15 **L. Thuram** • 16 **F. Barthez** • 17 **E. Petit** • 18 **F. Leboeuf** • 19 **C. Karembeu** • 20 D. Trezeguet • 21 **C. Dugarry** • 22 L. Charbonnier	(France) A. Jacquet	
2002	Brazil (detailed squad)	1 **Marcos** • 2 **Cafu** • 3 **Lúcio** • 4 **Roque Júnior** • 5 **Edmílson** • 6 **Roberto Carlos** • 7 Ricardinho • 8 **Gilberto Silva** • 9 **Ronaldo** • 10 **Rivaldo** • 11 **Ronaldinho** • 12 Dida • 13 Belletti • 14 Ânderson Polga • 15 **Kléberson** • 16 Júnior • 17 **Denílson** • 18 Vampeta • 19 **Juninho Paulista** • 20 Edílson • 21 Luizão • 22 Rogério Ceni • 23 Kaká	(Brazil) L. Scolari	
2006	Italy (detailed squad)	1 **G. Buffon** • 2 C. Zaccardo • 3 **F. Grosso** • 4 **D. De Rossi** • 5 **F. Cannavaro** • 6 A. Barzagli • 7 **A. Del Piero** • 8 **G. Gattuso** • 9 **L. Toni** • 10 **F. Totti** • 11 A. Gilardino • 12 A. Peruzzi • 13 A. Nesta • 14 M. Amelia • 15 **V. Iaquinta** • 16 **M. Camoranesi** • 17 S. Barone • 18 F. Inzaghi • 19 **G. Zambrotta** • 20 **S. Perrotta** • 21 **A. Pirlo** • 22 M. Oddo • 23 **M. Materazzi**	(Italy) M. Lippi	
2010	Spain (detailed squad)	1 **I. Casillas** • 2 R. Albiol • 3 **G. Piqué** • 4 C. Marchena • 5 **C. Puyol** • 6 **A. Iniesta** • 7 **D. Villa** • 8 **Xavi** • 9 **F. Torres** • 10 **C. Fàbregas** • 11 **J. Capdevila** • 12 V. Valdés • 13 J. Mata • 14 **X. Alonso** • 15 **S. Ramos** • 16 **S. Busquets** • 17 Á. Arbeloa • 18 **Pedro** • 19 F. Llorente • 20 J. Martínez • 21 D. Silva • 22 **J. Navas** • 23 P. Reina	(Spain) V. del Bosque	
2014	Germany (detailed squad)	1 **M. Neuer** • 2 K. Großkreutz • 3 M. Ginter • 4 **B. Höwedes** • 5 **M. Hummels** • 6 S. Khedira • 7 **B. Schweinsteiger** • 8 **M. Özil** • 9 **A. Schürrle** • 10 L. Podolski • 11 **M. Klose** • 12 R.-R. Zieler • 13 **T. Müller** • 14 J. Draxler • 15 E. Durm • 16 **P. Lahm** • 17 **P. Mertesacker** • 18 **T. Kroos** • 19 **M. Götze** • 20 **J. Boateng** • 21 S. Mustafi • 22 R. Weidenfeller • 23 **C. Kramer**	(Germany) J. Löw	
2018	France (detailed squad)	1 **H. Lloris** • 2 **B. Pavard** • 3 P. Kimpembe • 4 **R. Varane** • 5 **S. Umtiti** • 6 **P. Pogba** • 7 **A. Griezmann** • 8 T. Lemar • 9 **O. Giroud** • 10 **K. Mbappé** • 11 O. Dembélé • 12 **C. Tolisso** • 13 **N. Kanté** • 14 **B. Matuidi** • 15 **S. Nzonzi** • 16 S. Mandanda • 17 A. Rami • 18 **N. Fekir** • 19 D. Sidibé • 20 F. Thauvin • 21 **L. Hernandez** • 22 B. Mendy • 23 A. Areola	(France) D. Deschamps	
2022	Argentina (detailed squad)	1 F. Armani • 2 J. Foyth • 3 **N. Tagliafico** • 4 **G. Montiel** • 5 **L. Paredes** • 6 **G. Pezzella** • 7 **R. De Paul** • 8 **M. Acuña** • 9 **J. Álvarez** • 10 **L. Messi** • 11 **Á. Di María** • 12 G. Rulli • 13 **C. Romero** • 14 E. Palacios • 15 Á. Correa • 16 T. Almada • 17 P. Gómez • 18 G. Rodríguez • 19 **N. Otamendi** • 20 **A. Mac Allister** • 21 **P. Dybala** • 22 **La. Martínez** • 23 **E. Martínez** • 24 **E. Fernández** • 25 Li. Martínez • 26 **N. Molina**	(Argentina) L. Scaloni	
2026	Spain (detailed squad)	1 D. Raya • 2 M. Pubill • 3 Á. Grimaldo • 4 **E. García** • 5 M. Llorente • 6 **M. Merino** • 7 **F. Torres** • 8 **F. Ruiz** • 9 Gavi • 10 **D. Olmo** • 11 Y. Pino • 12 **P. Porro** • 13 J. Garcia • 14 **A. Laporte** • 15 **Á. Baena** • 16 **Rodri** • 17 **N. Williams** • 18 **M. Zubimendi** • 19 **Lamine Yamal** • 20 **Pedri** • 21 **M. Oyarzabal** • 22 **P. Cubarsí** • 23 **U. Simón** • 24 **M. Cucurella** • 25 V. Muñoz • 26 B. Iglesias	(Spain) L. de la Fuente	

== See also ==
- List of players who have appeared in the most FIFA World Cups
- List of FIFA World Cup winning managers
- List of FIFA World Cup finals
