= Recoba =

Recoba may refer to:

- Álvaro Recoba (born 1976), Uruguayan footballer and manager
- Emilio Recoba (1904–1992), Uruguayan footballer
- Jeremía Recoba (born 2003), Uruguayan footballer, son of Álvaro
