= Carlo Ceresoli =

Italian footballer and manager (1910-1995)

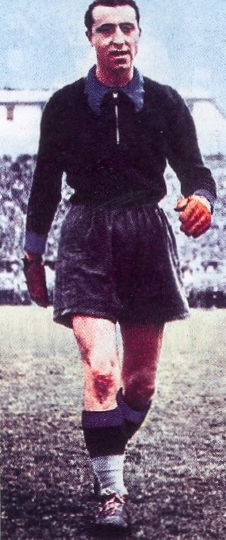
- Ceresoli with Inter Milan in the 1930s

Personal information
- Full name: Carlo Ceresoli
- Date of birth: 14 June 1910
- Place of birth: Kingdom of Italy
- Date of death: 22 April 1995 (aged 84)
- Position: Goalkeeper

International career
Years	Team	Apps	(Gls)
1934–1938	Italy	8	(0)
Medal record
Italy
Central European International Cup
Gold medal – first place	1933–35 Central European International Cup
FIFA World Cup
Gold medal – first place	1938 Italy

Carlo Ceresoli (Italian pronunciation: [ˈkarlo tʃereˈzɔːli]; 14 June 1910 – 22 April 1995) was an Italian football goalkeeper.

== Club career ==
Born in Bergamo, Ceresoli played club football in the Italian Serie B with Atalanta, and in the Serie A with Inter Milan, Bologna, Genoa and Juventus.

== International career ==
Ceresoli was considered one of the strongest Italian goalkeepers of the 1930s along with Gianpiero Combi, Guido Masetti & Aldo Olivieri. With the Italy national team he played the only qualifying match of the 1934 FIFA World Cup against Greece, and the famous Battle of Highbury against England, in which he saved a penalty from Eric Brook. As Gianpiero Combi retired from football after the 1934 World Cup, Ceresoli got to start the last three matches of the 1933-35 Central European International Cup. Winning his first tournament with the Italy national team. He also won the 1938 World Cup with the Italy national team, as a back up for Aldo Olivieri, and went on to win a total of 8 caps for Italy.

== Honours ==
=== International ===
Italy

- FIFA World Cup: 1938
- Central European International Cup: 1933–35
