= Chizzy =

Chizzy is a nickname. Notable people known by this name include the following:

== Nickname ==
- Andrea Chizoba "Chizzy" Akudolu (born 1973), British actress
- Chigozie Stephanie "Chizzy" Alichi (born 1993), Nigerian film actress
- Chizzy Chisholm, former band member of Big Mountain (band)
- Dave Chisnall (born 1980), English darts player

== Mononym ==
- Chizzy, mononym by which Charles Stephens III is known, K-pop and R & B songwriter and producer with credits such as Indigo (Chris Brown album), A.K.A. (album), Neo Zone & NCT 2020 Resonance

== See also ==
- Bruno Chizzo
