= List of FIFA World Cup winning managers =

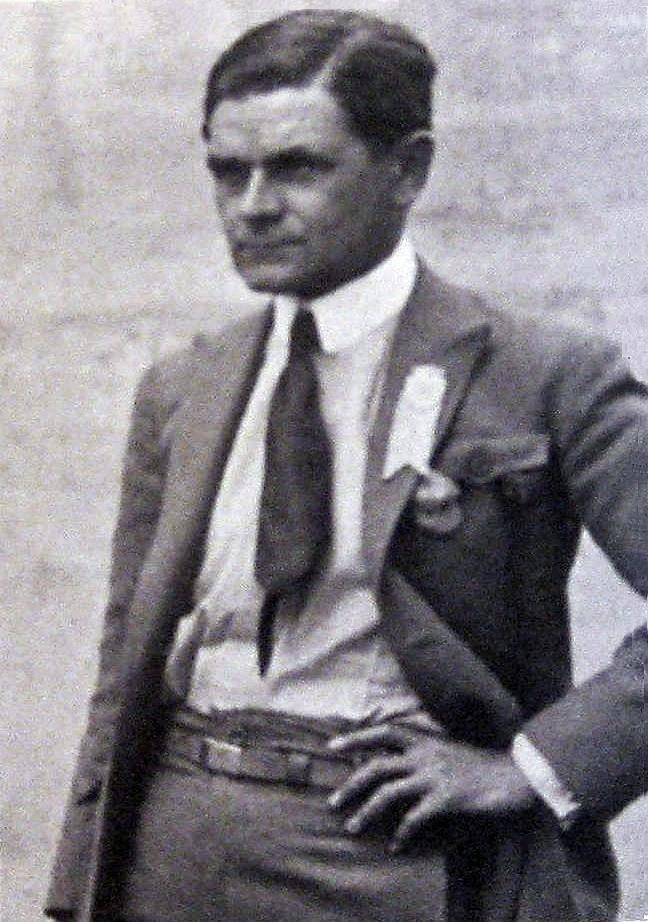
Vittorio Pozzo is the only manager to have won the World Cup twice.

The FIFA World Cup is considered to be the most prestigious association football tournament in the world. The twenty-three World Cup tournaments have been won by eight national teams. Brazil have won five times, followed by Germany and Italy with four titles each; Argentina with three titles, France, Uruguay and Spain with two titles each; and England with one title. The role of the manager is to select the squad for the World Cup and develop the tactics of the team. Pressure is attached to the role due to the significance of winning a World Cup and the lack of day-to-day contact with players during the regular club season, aside from international breaks.

Alberto Suppici led the Uruguay national team to victory in the inaugural tournament in 1930. Vittorio Pozzo is the only person who has won the World Cup twice as a manager, in 1934 and 1938 with Italy. Twenty-two different managers have won the World Cup and all winning managers led their own country's national team. Six other managers finished as winners once and runners-up once; Helmut Schön (winner in 1974, runner-up in 1966) for West Germany, Carlos Bilardo (winner in 1986, runner-up in 1990) for Argentina, Franz Beckenbauer (winner in 1990, runner-up in 1986) for West Germany, Mário Zagallo (winner in 1970, runner-up in 1998) for Brazil, Didier Deschamps (winner in 2018, runner-up in 2022) for France, and Lionel Scaloni (winner in 2022, runner-up in 2026) for Argentina.

Carlos Alberto Parreira holds the record for managing at the most FIFA World Cup final tournaments, with six appearances while in charge of five different national teams. Deschamps, who coached France to victory in the 2018 World Cup, has managed the most matches in the tournament at 27. He won a record 20 matches during his spell as France manager from 2014 to the 2026 World Cup. Suppici is the youngest manager to win the World Cup, aged 31 in 1930. Zagallo and César Luis Menotti were also in their 30s when they won the World Cup; Zagallo was 38 years old in 1970 and Menotti was 39 in 1978. Luis de la Fuente is the oldest coach to win the World Cup, aged 65 in 2026.

Three men have won the tournament both as a player and as a manager; Zagallo (as a player in 1958 and 1962, as a manager in 1970), Beckenbauer (as a player in 1974, as a manager in 1990) and Deschamps (as a player in 1998, as a manager in 2018). Both Beckenbauer and Deschamps were also the captain of their respective teams while winning the World Cup as a player.

== Winning managers ==
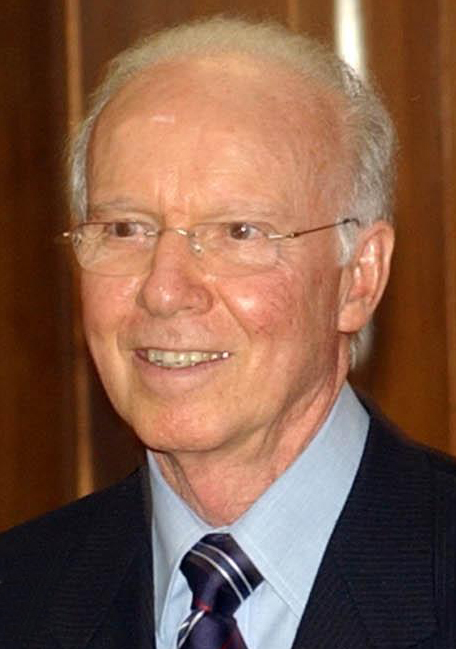
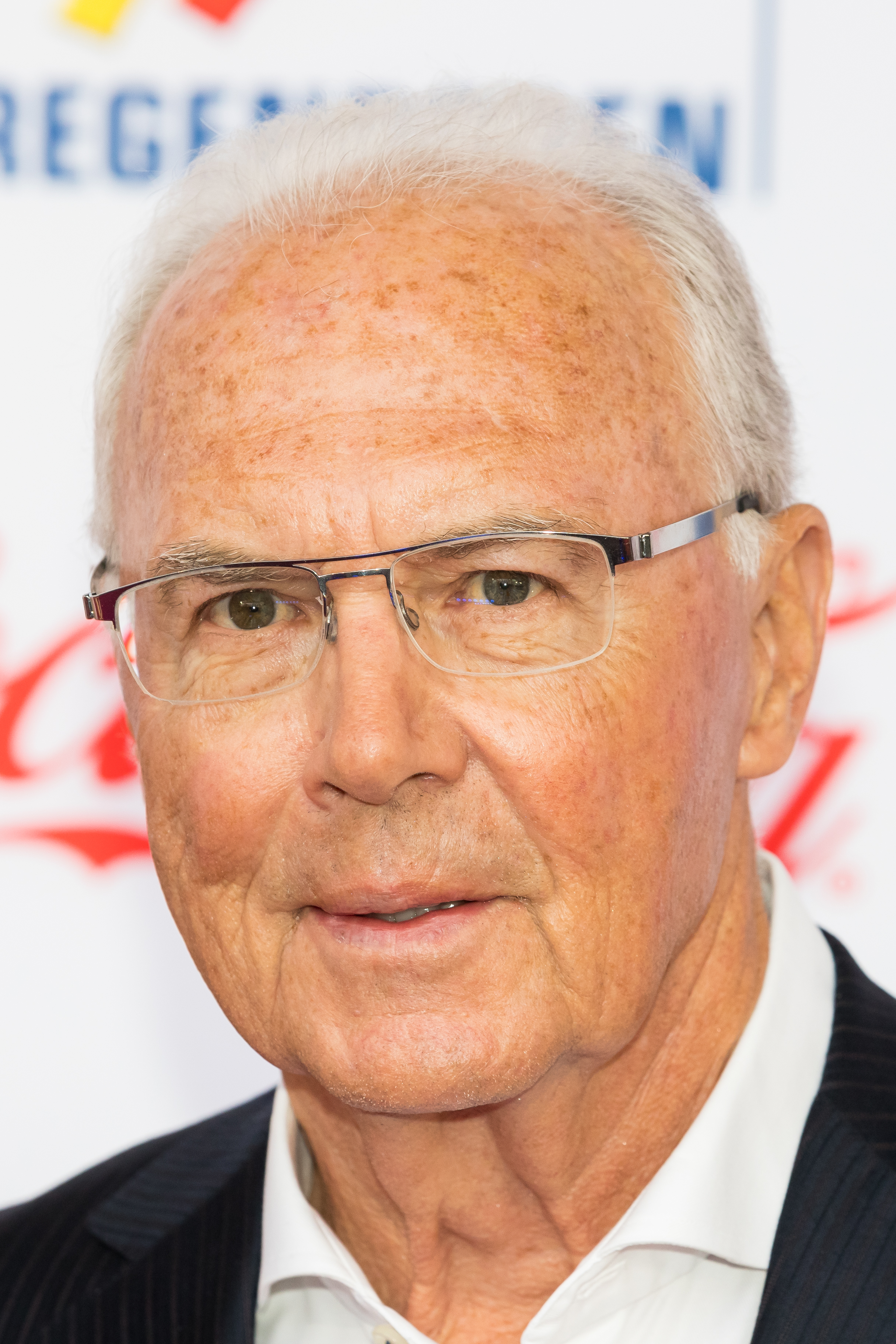
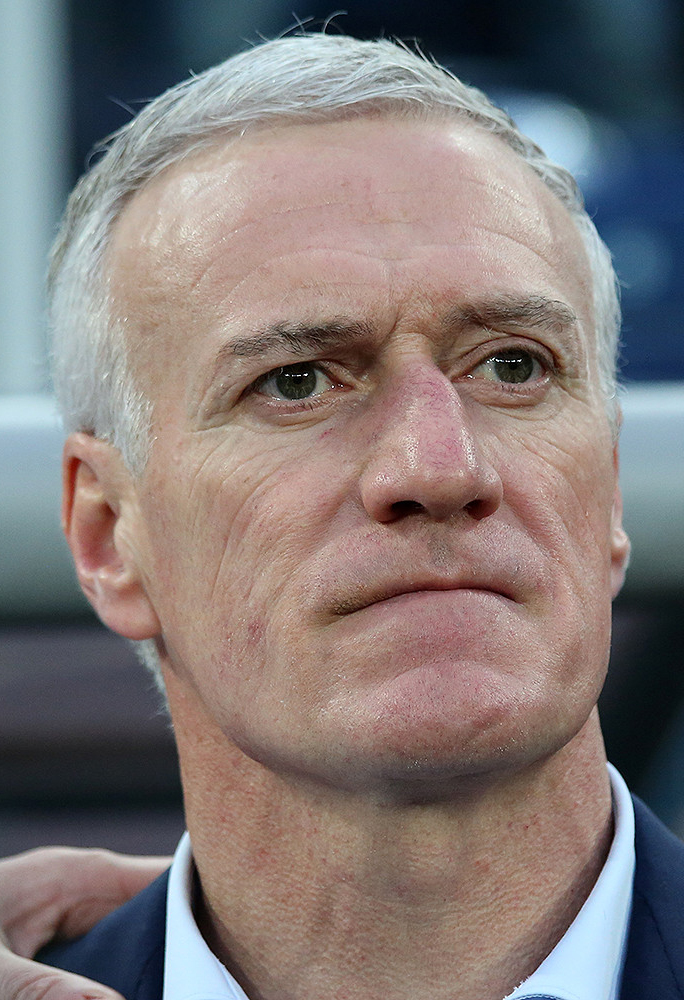
Mário Zagallo of Brazil (left), Franz Beckenbauer of Germany (middle) and Didier Deschamps of France (right), have won the World Cup as a player and a manager for their respective countries.

FIFA World Cup-winning managers
Tournament	Winning manager	Nationality	Winning national team
1930	Alberto Suppici	Uruguay	Uruguay
1934	Vittorio Pozzo	Italy	Italy
1938	Vittorio Pozzo	Italy	Italy
1950	Juan López Fontana	Uruguay	Uruguay
1954	Sepp Herberger	West Germany	West Germany
1958	Vicente Feola	Brazil	Brazil
1962	Aymoré Moreira	Brazil	Brazil
1966	Alf Ramsey	England	England
1970	Mário Zagallo	Brazil	Brazil
1974	Helmut Schön	West Germany	West Germany
1978	César Luis Menotti	Argentina	Argentina
1982	Enzo Bearzot	Italy	Italy
1986	Carlos Bilardo	Argentina	Argentina
1990	Franz Beckenbauer	West Germany	West Germany
1994	Carlos Alberto Parreira	Brazil	Brazil
1998	Aimé Jacquet	France	France
2002	Luiz Felipe Scolari	Brazil	Brazil
2006	Marcello Lippi	Italy	Italy
2010	Vicente del Bosque	Spain	Spain
2014	Joachim Löw	Germany	Germany
2018	Didier Deschamps	France	France
2022	Lionel Scaloni	Argentina	Argentina
2026	Luis de la Fuente	Spain	Spain

== By nationality ==
Nationality	Manager(s)	Number of wins
Brazil	5	5
Italy	3	4
Germany (Note: Includes West Germany)	4	4
Argentina	3	3
Uruguay	2	2
France	2	2
Spain	2	2
England	1	1

== See also ==
- List of FIFA World Cup winning players

== Bibliography ==
- Lisi, Clemente A. (2022). The FIFA World Cup: A History of the Planet's Biggest Sporting Event. Rowman & Littlefield. ISBN 978-1-5381-5643-8.
- Marshall, Anne (1997). Guinness Book of Knowledge. Guinness Publishing. ISBN 978-0-85112-046-1.
- McColl, Graham (2010). How to Win the World Cup. Transworld Publishers. ISBN 978-0-593-06622-5.
- Radnedge, Keir (2022). World Soccer Records. Welbeck Publishing Group. ISBN 978-1-80279-356-7.
