= Aníbal Paz =

Uruguayan footballer (1917-2013)

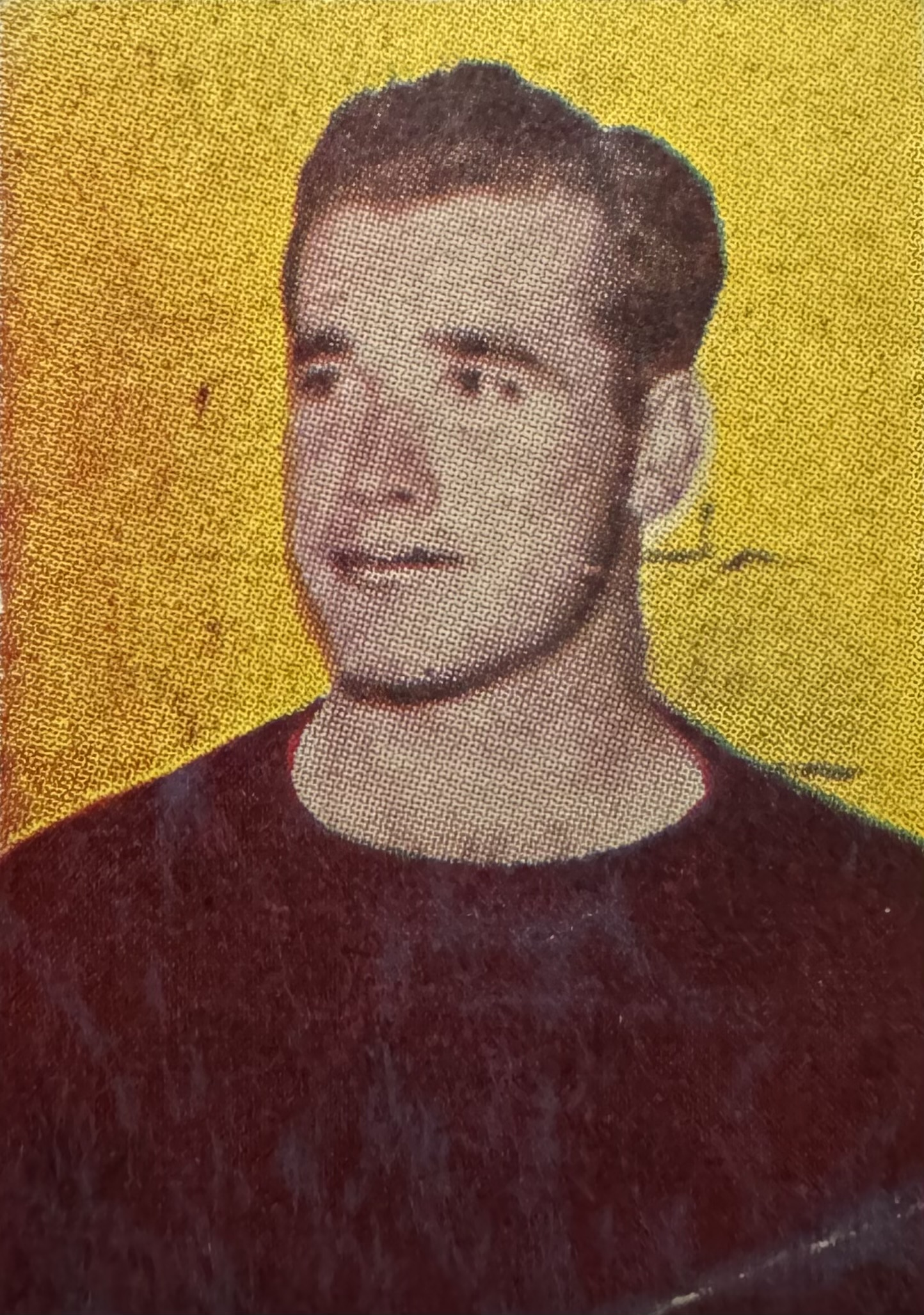
- Aníbal Paz

Personal information
- Full name: Aníbal Luis Paz Piuma
- Date of birth: 21 May 1917
- Place of birth: Montevideo, Uruguay
- Date of death: 21 March 2013 (aged 95)
- Place of death: Montevideo, Uruguay
- Position: Goalkeeper

Senior career*
| Years | Team | Apps | (Gls) |
| 1933–1937 | Liverpool Montevideo | | |
| 1937–1938 | Bella Vista | | |
| 1938–1953 | Nacional | 471 | (0) |
| 1954 | Racing | | |

International career
| 1940–1950 | Uruguay | 23 | (0) |
Medal record
Representing Uruguay
FIFA World Cup
| Winner | 1950 Brazil |
South American Championship
| Winner | 1942 Uruguay |
| Runner-up | 1941 Chile |
- * Club domestic league appearances and goals

Aníbal Luis Paz Piuma (21 May 1917 – 21 March 2013) was a Uruguayan footballer who played as a goalkeeper for Club Nacional de Futbol from 1939 to 1953 and for the Uruguay national team, earning 23 caps. With Nacional, he won the Uruguayan championship nine times (1939–43, '46–47, '50 and '52). He was part of Uruguay's championship winning team at the 1950 FIFA World Cup and was South American champion in 1942.

== Club career ==
Paz started his professional football career in 1933 with the Montevideo team Liverpool when he was 15 years old. Despite being from Montevideo himself, it was at Liverpool where he obtained his nickname “Canario.” In Uruguay, "canarito" is an affectionate nickname for people from the Canelones region, a department in the country. In the context of the Uruguayan national football team, "canarito" is also a nickname used for players and fans due to their passion for the team. Paz stayed with Liverpool through 1937, followed by a brief stint at Bella Vista.

Paz joined Nacional in 1939 and stayed until 1953. At just 23 years old and eager to succeed, he put his quality and youth at the service of the tricolor cause. His first derby as a starting goalkeeper was a 2-0 victory in the Nacional Championship on June 11, 1939, in the Campeonato de Honor. He defended for the club for 15 consecutive years, and in his final seasons wore the captain's armband. He was a Uruguayan champion with the Tricolores on nine occasions, a critical player in the Golden Five-Year Championship (Quinquenio de Oro), and won the Atlantic Cup (Copa del Atlántico) in 1947.

From his first victory on, he was virtually irreplaceable in the goal. Paz gradually acquired an innovative goalkeeping style and distinctive personality on the pitch. His shout commanding the entire defense could be heard from the stands. It was said to be impossible not to hear his cry of "mine” when he attacked the ball, devastating everyone, teammates and opponents alike. This famous cry was an order to his teammates, and a cause for doubt for opposing forwards, who knew that if he shouted "mine” he wouldn't make a mistake. Uncommon for goalkeepers of the time, Paz would come off his line to look for the cross or throw himself at the feet of the attacking striker. He was known to catch opponent shots in his hands rather than allowing the ball to strike his chest.

After playing for Nacional in 471 matches over 15 years, Paz retired from football, but returned to the Tricolores a few years later as a goalkeeping coach. He died on 21 March 2013 at the age of 95.

World Cup-winners status
| Preceded by Pietro Rava | Oldest living player 5 November 2006 – 21 March 2013 | Succeeded by Ottmar Walter |
