= Piero Pasinati =

Italian footballer (1910–2000)

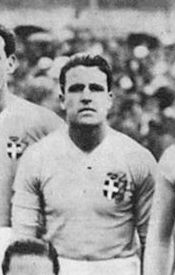
- Pasinati with the Italy national team in 1936

Personal information
- Date of birth: 21 July 1910
- Place of birth: Trieste, Austria-Hungary
- Date of death: 15 November 2000 (aged 90)
- Place of death: Trieste, Italy
- Position: Forward

Senior career*
Years	Team	Apps	(Gls)
1928–1939	Triestina	301	(34)
1939–1940	A.C. Milan	21	(3)
1940–1941	Novara	29	(6)
1941–1944	Triestina	67	(8)
1946–1948	Triestina	9	(0)
1949–1950	Cremonese	8	(0)
1948–1949	San Giovanni	?	(?)

International career
1936–1938	Italy	11	(5)

Managerial career
- 1946–1947: Cremonese
- 1950–1951: Ponziana
- 1952: Padova
- 1954: Sambenedettese
- 1955–1957: Triestina
- 1957–1961: Catanzaro
- 1961–1962: Crotone
- 1962: Salernitana
- 1963: Sambenedettese
- 1963–1964: Savona
Medal record
Italy
FIFA World Cup
Winner	FIFA World Cup	1938 France
- * Club domestic league appearances and goals

Piero Pasinati, born Pietro Pasinati (Italian pronunciation: [ˈpjɛː(t)ro paziˈnaːti]; 21 July 1910 – 15 November 2000) was an Italian football player and manager, who played as a forward.

== Club career ==
Pasinati was born in Trieste. During his club career, he played for Italian teams Triestina (1927–1939 and 1941–1946), A.C. Milan (1939–40), Novara Calcio (1940–41), Cremonese in Serie B (1946–48), and San Giovanni Trieste, in the third division (1948–49). With Triestina he played 256 Serie A matches.

== International career ==
With Italy, Pasinati obtained 11 international caps between 1936 and 1938, scoring 1 goal, which came in his only appearance in the team's victorious 1938 FIFA World Cup campaign, in the nation's first round match against Norway.

== Managerial career ==
Following his retirement, Pasinati coached Ponziana, Sambenedettese, Salernitana, Triestina, Catanzaro and Empoli.

== Managerial statistics ==
Team	Nat	From	To	Record				
Team	Nat	From	To	G	W	D	L	Win %
U.S. Catanzaro 1929	Italy	1 July 1957	22 January 1961	58	17	19	22	29.31
Total				58	17	19	22	29.31

== Honours ==
Italy

- FIFA World Cup: 1938

World Cup-winners status
Preceded by Guido Masetti	Oldest living player 26 November 1993 – 15 November 2000	Succeeded by Aldo Olivieri
