= Guido Masetti =

Italian footballer (1907–1993)

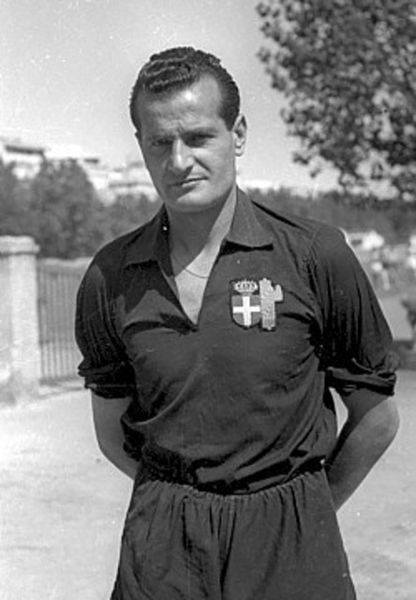

Personal information
- Date of birth: 22 November 1907
- Place of birth: Verona, Kingdom of Italy
- Date of death: 26 November 1993 (aged 86)
- Place of death: Rome, Italy
- Position: Goalkeeper

Senior career*
Years	Team	Apps	(Gls)
1926–1930	Hellas Verona		
1930–1943	Roma		

International career
1934–1939	Italy	2	(0)

Managerial career
- 1942–1943: Gubbio
- 1943–1945: Roma
- 1950–1951: Roma
- 1952: Palermo
- 1956–1957: Roma
Medal record
Italy
FIFA World Cup
Gold medal – first place	1934 Italy
Gold medal – first place	1938 France
- * Club domestic league appearances and goals

Guido Masetti (Italian pronunciation: [ˈɡwiːdo maˈzetti]; 22 November 1907 – 26 November 1993) was an Italian football player and manager.

== Club career ==
Born in Verona, Masetti played as a goalkeeper for Hellas Verona, and A.S. Roma from 1929 to 1943, appearing in 339 matches, winning an Italian title in the 1941–42 season.

== International career ==
Masetti was considered in the 1930s and 1940s to be one of the strongest goalkeepers, but as a member for the Italy national team he was merely used as a stand-in for Gianpiero Combi and Aldo Olivieri. The team won the World Cups of 1934 and 1938 without Masetti playing in any of the matches.

== Managerial career ==
In 1950s, he was manager of A.S. Roma for ten games (5 in season 1950–51, and another 5 in season 1956–57).

== Death ==
He died at age 86 in Rome.

== Honours ==
=== Player ===
Roma

- Serie A: 1941–42; runner-up 1930–31, 1935–36
- Coppa Italia runner-up: 1936–37, 1940–41

Italy

- FIFA World Cup: 1934, 1938

=== Individual ===
- A.S. Roma Hall of Fame: 2015

World Cup-winners status
Preceded by Angelo Schiavio	Oldest living player 17 September 1990 – 26 November 1993	Succeeded by Piero Pasinati
