= Ottmar Walter =

German footballer (1924–2013)

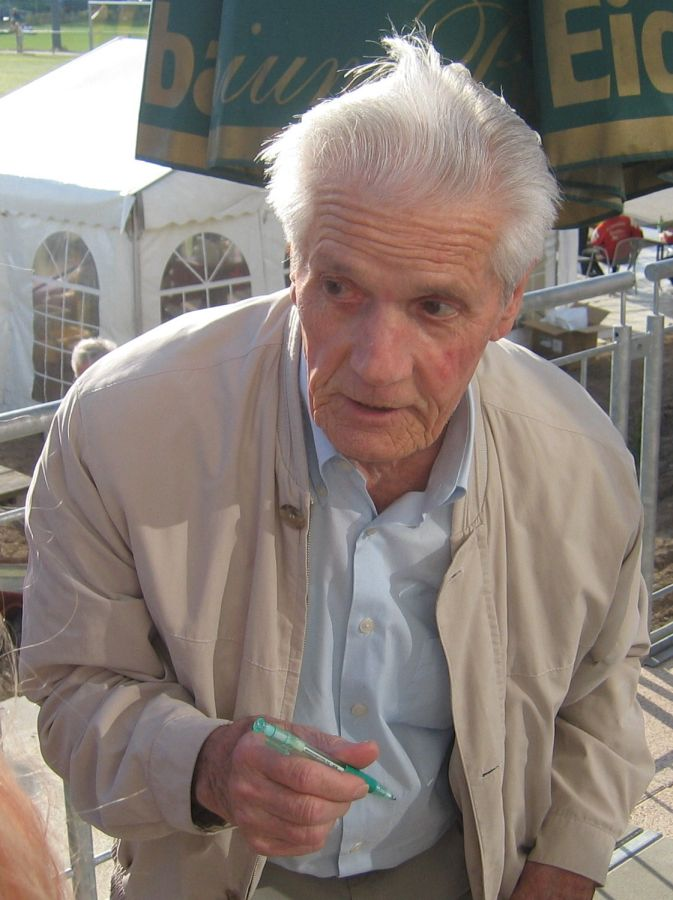
- Walter in 2005

Personal information
- Full name: Ottmar Kurt Herrmann Walter
- Date of birth: 6 March 1924
- Place of birth: Kaiserslautern, Germany
- Date of death: 16 June 2013 (aged 89)
- Place of death: Kaiserslautern, Germany
- Height: 1.77 m (5 ft 10 in)
- Position: Forward

Youth career
- 1933–1941: 1. FC Kaiserslautern

Senior career*
| Years | Team | Apps | (Gls) |
| 1941–1942 | 1. FC Kaiserslautern | 19 | (18) |
| 1942-1943 | SV Cuxhaven | | |
| 1943 | Holstein Kiel | 6 | (3) |
| 1946–1956 | 1. FC Kaiserslautern | 311 | (335) |
| Total | | 336 | (356) |

International career
| 1950–1955 | West Germany | 20 | (10) |
| 1956 | West Germany B | 1 | (1) |
Medal record
Men's football
Representing West Germany
FIFA World Cup
| Winner | 1954 Switzerland |
- * Club domestic league appearances and goals

Ottmar Kurt Herrmann Walter (6 March 1924 – 16 June 2013) was a German footballer who played as a forward.

He played together with his brother, Fritz Walter, at the club 1. FC Kaiserslautern. They also played together for the West Germany national team in the 1954 FIFA World Cup. Walter scored four goals in the tournament as West Germany won their first ever World Cup title. In total, Walter earned 20 caps and scored 10 goals for Germany. For his club 1. FC Kaiserslautern he scored an unequaled 336 goals in 321 league and cup matches. Walter debuted in the first team at the age of 18 in 1942 as an outside left in a 7–1 rout of Waldhof Mannheim.

During World War II, Walter was drafted into the Kriegsmarine and suffered heavy injuries in his right knee. After several operations, he was forced to end his career in 1958.

== Career ==
Born in Kaiserslautern, Walter and his two brothers Fritz and Ludwig all joined local club, 1. FC Kaiserslautern. After making his debut for the club in 1942 he was posted by the navy to Kiel, where he played for Holstein Kiel.

By the late-1940s, Walter was the center forward of 1. FC Kaiserslautern. Like his brother Fritz, he treated the ball elegantly and was also pacy and possessed a powerful shot. As a center forward he also often moved to the wing.

== Later life and death ==
After the end of his career, he concentrated on operating a gas station which he had taken at rent in 1954. When the contract was signed, Walter had failed to notice the fine print in the contract which determined that if the contract got withdrawn, the gas station and the goods on the ground of the gas station would subrogate to the new leaseholder. This happened in 1969 and in consequence of this Walter tried to commit suicide. However, he survived and later described that attempted suicide as a "panic reaction". Later Walter found a job as an employee of the city of Kaiserslautern.

He died 16 June 2013.

World Cup-winners status
| Preceded by Aníbal Paz | Oldest living player 21 March – 16 June 2013 | Succeeded by Nílton Santos |
