= Mario Perazzolo =

Italian footballer (1911–2001)

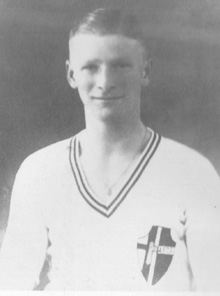
- Peralozzo c. 1944

Personal information
- Date of birth: 7 June 1911
- Place of birth: Padua, Italy
- Date of death: 3 August 2001 (aged 90)
- Place of death: Padua, Italy
- Height: 1.69 m (5 ft 7 in)
- Positions: Centre half; half-back; inside forward

Senior career*
Years	Team	Apps	(Gls)
1928–33	Padova	120	(33)
1933–36	Fiorentina	85	(7)
1936–42	Genoa	165	(14)
1942–48	Brescia	120	(4)
1949–50	Siracusa	1	(0)
Total		491	(58)

International career
1936–39	Italy	8	(0)
Medal record
Italy
FIFA World Cup
Gold medal – first place	1938 France
- * Club domestic league appearances and goals

Mario Perazzolo (Italian pronunciation: [ˈmaːrjo peratˈtsɔːlo]; 7 June 1911 – 3 August 2001) was an Italian footballer who played as a defender, as a midfielder or as a forward.

== Club career ==
During his career, Perazzolo played for Padova and Fiorentina before moving to Genoa, where he spent most of his career; he later also played for Brescia and Siracusa. Like many great players, Mario evolved technically. He started his career as an inside forward, a position he played for five years at Padova and three at Fiorentina. He later switched to centre-half and half-back where he played his best seasons for Genoa. For the national team, he also played in Meazza's position in an outing after the team had just won the 1936 Olympic title, subsequently switching to a midfield position as the World Cup approached. He was a starter in their final warm-up before leaving for Paris; however, Pozzo decided to go with Serantoni instead. He would win another six caps with the national team. At nearly forty years of age, he played his last season at Siracusa in Serie B, having won the FIFA World Cup and the Coppa Italia with Genoa.

== International career ==
Perazzolo was part of the 1938 FIFA World Cup-winning squad, Italy's second World Cup title. He earned eight caps for the Italy national team in the 1930s between 1936 and 1939.

== Death ==
Perazzolo died on 3 August 2001 in Padua, aged 90.

== Honours ==
Genoa

- Coppa Italia: 1936–37

Italy

- FIFA World Cup: 1938

World Cup-winners status
Preceded by Aldo Olivieri	Oldest living player 5 April – 3 August 2001	Succeeded by Pietro Rava
