= Juan Carlos Calvo =

Uruguayan footballer (1906-1977)

Personal information
- Full name: Juan Carlos Calvo
- Date of birth: June 26, 1906
- Place of birth: Uruguay
- Date of death: October 12, 1977 (aged 71)
- Position: Forward

Senior career*
Years	Team	Apps	(Gls)
1926–1937	Miramar Misiones		

International career
1930	Uruguay	0	(0)
Medal record
Men's football
Representing Uruguay
FIFA World Cup
Winner	1930 Uruguay
- * Club domestic league appearances and goals

Juan Carlos Calvo (June 26, 1906 in Montevideo – October 12, 1977) was a Uruguayan footballer. He was part of the squad that won the first World Cup in 1930 for Uruguay, but he did not play any matches in the tournament. He was a club player for Miramar Misiones.

== Honours ==
Miramar Misiones

- Divisional Intermedia (2nd level): 1935 (as Misiones)
- Divisional Extra (3rd level): 1937 (as Miramar)

Uruguay

- FIFA World Cup: 1930
