= Ado (footballer) =

Brazilian footballer (born 1944)

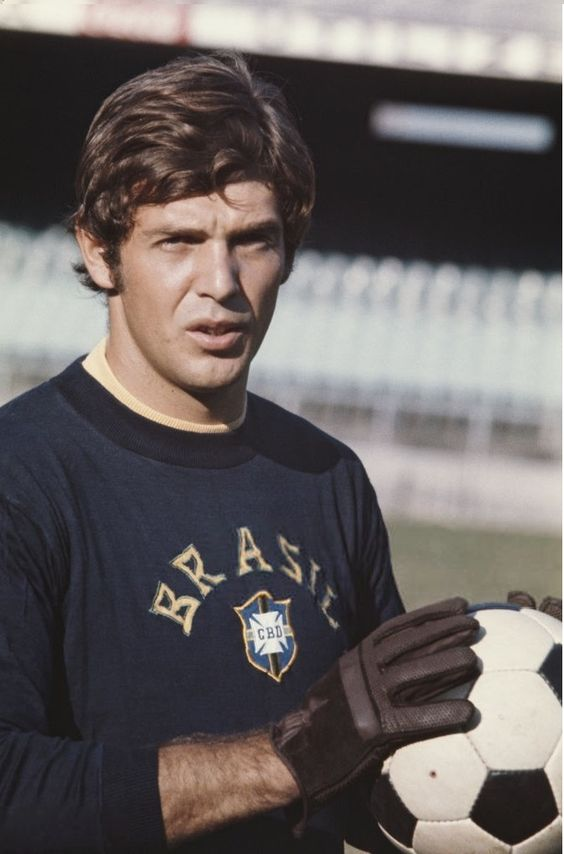
- Ado in 1970

Personal information
- Full name: Eduardo Roberto Stinghen
- Date of birth: 4 July 1944 (age 82)
- Place of birth: Jaraguá do Sul, Brazil
- Position: Goalkeeper

Senior career*
Years	Team	Apps	(Gls)
1964–1968	Londrina		
- Corinthians
- America-RJ
- Atlético Mineiro
- Portuguesa
- Velo Clube
- Fortaleza
- Ferroviário
- Bragantino

International career
1970	Brazil	3	(0)
Medal record
Men's Football
Representing Brazil
FIFA World Cup
Winner	1970 Mexico
- * Club domestic league appearances and goals

Eduardo Roberto Stinghen (born 4 July 1944), best known as Ado, is a Brazilian former footballer who played as a goalkeeper.

In his career (1964–1984) he played for Londrina, Corinthians, America-RJ, Atlético Mineiro, Portuguesa, Velo Clube, Fortaleza, Ferroviário and Bragantino. He was selected in the Brazilian team for their win in the 1970 World Cup without playing any games in the tournament.

== Honours ==
Brazil

- FIFA World Cup: 1970
