= Washington Ortuño =

Uruguayan footballer (1928-1973)

Personal information
- Full name: Washington Ortuño
- Date of birth: May 13, 1928
- Place of birth: Uruguay
- Date of death: September 15, 1973 (aged 45)
- Position: Midfielder

Senior career*
Years	Team	Apps	(Gls)
1946–1951	Peñarol		

International career
1950	Uruguay	0	(0)
Medal record
Representing Uruguay
FIFA World Cup
Winner	1950 Brazil
- * Club domestic league appearances and goals

Wáshington Ortuño (13 May 1928 – 15 September 1973) was a former Uruguayan footballer, who played for CA Peñarol.

For the Uruguay national football team, he was part of the 1950 FIFA World Cup winning team, but did not play in any matches in the tournament.
