= Héctor Zelada =

Argentine footballer

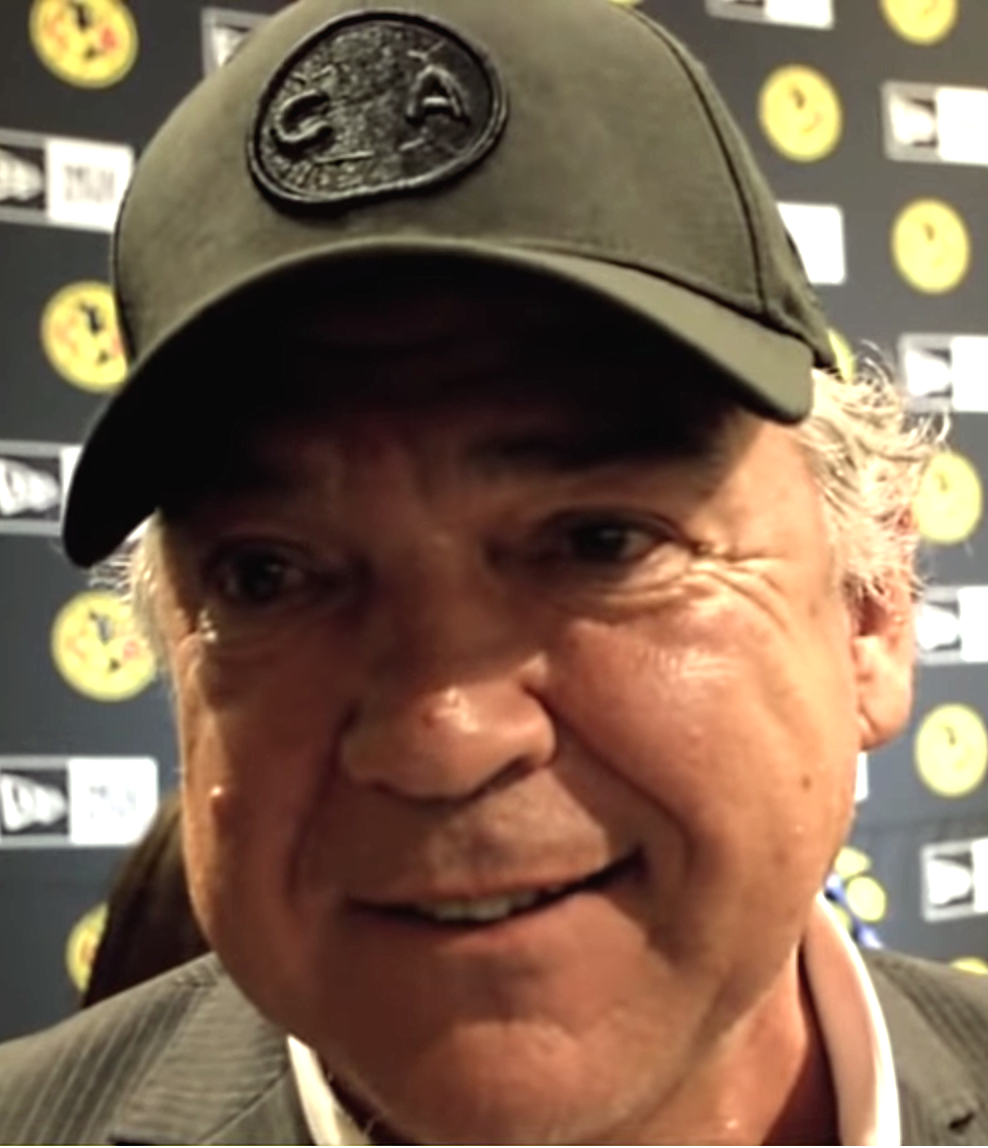
- Zelada in 2018

Personal information
- Full name: Héctor Miguel Zelada Bertoqui
- Date of birth: 30 April 1957 (age 69)
- Place of birth: Maciel, Santa Fe, Argentina
- Height: 1.78 m (5 ft 10 in)
- Position: Goalkeeper

Senior career*
Years	Team	Apps	(Gls)
1976–1978	Rosario Central	92	(0)
1978–1987	América	294	(0)
1988–1990	Atlante	58	(0)
Total		432	(0)

International career
1986	Argentina		
Medal record
Men's football
Representing Argentina
FIFA World Cup
Winner	1986 Mexico
- * Club domestic league appearances and goals

Héctor Miguel Zelada Bertoqui (born 30 April 1957) is an Argentine former footballer who played as a goalkeeper. He started his career at Rosario Central but he played mostly in Mexico, for Club América. He was the third-choice goalkeeper for the Argentina side that won the 1986 FIFA World Cup but did not play a minute of the tournament; in fact, he never played a game for the national team.

== Career ==
Héctor Miguel Zelada began his career with Rosario Central in 1976, making 92 appearances. In 1978, 20-year-old Zelada made a move to Mexico City club América. He would make his debut in a league match against Guadalajara on 4 March 1979. The match ended in a 0–0 draw. He won his first league title with América during the 1983–84 season, having a standout performance against Guadalajara in the second leg of the final, with the score 2–2 after the first leg. In the second-leg, the game was tied 0-0 when Zelada committed a foul in the penalty area. He subsequently saved Eduardo Cisneros' penalty kick. América would go on to win the final 3–1.

Zelada would go on to win the 1984–85 and the Prode-85 championships with América and play in over 250 matches for the club. His final match was a 1–1 draw against León in 1990. He would move to Atlante F.C. that same year, playing in 58 matches before officially retiring in 1992.

== Honours ==
=== Club ===
América

- Mexican Primera División: 1983–84, 1984–85, Prode-85
- Campeón de Campeones: 1988, 1989
- CONCACAF Champions' Cup: 1987

=== International ===
Argentina

- FIFA World Cup: 1986

=== Individual ===
- Mexican Primera División Golden Ball: 1983–84
