= Giuseppe Cavanna =

Italian footballer

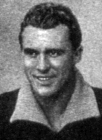

Personal information
- Full name: Giuseppe Cavanna
- Date of birth: 18 September 1905
- Place of birth: Vercelli, Kingdom of Italy
- Date of death: 3 November 1976 (aged 71)
- Place of death: Vercelli, Italy
- Height: 1.71 m (5 ft 7 in)
- Position: Goalkeeper

Youth career
- 1921–1925: Vercellesi Erranti

Senior career*
Years	Team	Apps	(Gls)
1925–1929	Pro Vercelli	65	(0)
1929–1936	Napoli	151	(0)
1936–1937	Benevento	26	(0)
1937–1939	Pro Vercelli	40	(0)
Total		282	(0)

International career
1931	Italy B	6	(0)
Medal record
Italy
FIFA World Cup
Gold medal – first place	1934 Italy
- * Club domestic league appearances and goals

Giuseppe Cavanna (18 September 1905 – 3 November 1976) was an Italian football goalkeeper.

== Club career ==
Born in Vercelli, Cavanna played in the 1920s and 1930s for Pro Vercelli and S.S.C. Napoli. He played 151 matches in Serie A. In the 1934–35 season he had the lowest goals conceded per game average (0.722) for Napoli, a record which stood until Dino Zoff broke it during the 1970–71 season.

== International career ==
Cavanna was the reserve goalkeeper for Italy that won the 1934 FIFA World Cup on home soil.

== Honours ==
=== International ===
Italy

- FIFA World Cup: 1934
