= Juan Burgueño =

Uruguayan footballer (1923–1997)

Personal information
- Full name: Juan Burgueño Pereira
- Date of birth: 4 February 1923
- Place of birth: Uruguay
- Date of death: 21 September 1997 (aged 74)
- Position: Forward

Senior career*
Years	Team	Apps	(Gls)
1947-1948	Atlanta	16	(3)
1950	Danubio		

International career
1947-1950	Uruguay	4	(0)
Medal record
Representing Uruguay
FIFA World Cup
Winner	1950 Brazil
- * Club domestic league appearances and goals

Juan Burgueño Pereira (4 February 1923 – 21 September 1997) was a Uruguayan footballer, who played for Danubio and the Argentine Club Atlético Atlanta.

For the Uruguay national football team, he was part of the 1950 FIFA World Cup-winning squad, but did not play in any matches in the tournament.
