= Carlos Riolfo =

Uruguayan footballer (1905–1978)

Personal information
- Full name: Juan Carlos Riolfo Seco
- Date of birth: November 5, 1905
- Place of birth: Uruguay
- Date of death: December 5, 1978 (aged 73)
- Position: Defender

Senior career*
Years	Team	Apps	(Gls)
1930	Peñarol		
1931	Nacional		
1934-1940	Nacional		

International career
1928	Uruguay	2	(0)
Medal record
Men's football
Representing Uruguay
FIFA World Cup
Winner	1930 Uruguay
- * Club domestic league appearances and goals

Juan Carlos Riolfo Seco (November 5, 1905 – December 5, 1978) was a Uruguayan footballer who played for the Uruguay national team. He played only 2 matches for national team, both in 1928 against Argentina, but was an unused member of the team which won the first ever World Cup in 1930. He played for Peñarol in club football.
