= Jair Marinho =

Brazilian footballer (1936–2020)

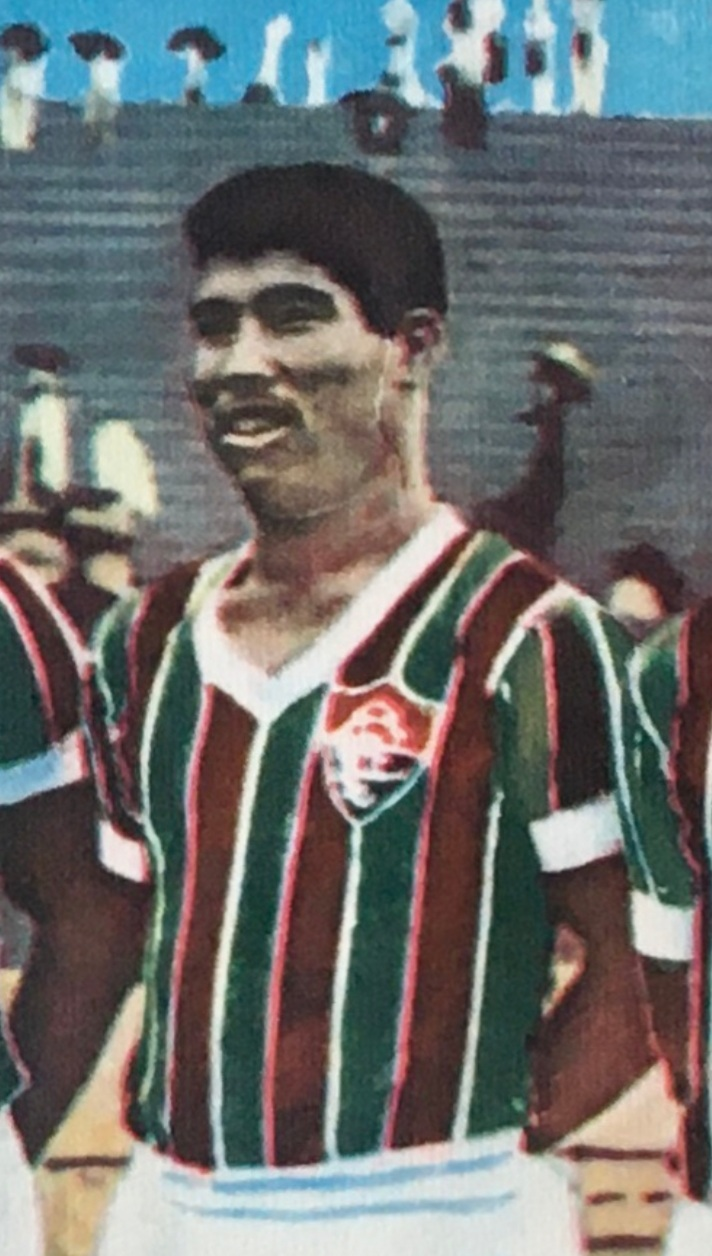

Personal information
- Full name: Jair Marinho de Oliveira
- Date of birth: 17 July 1936
- Place of birth: Santo Antônio de Padua, Brazil
- Date of death: 7 March 2020 (aged 83)
- Place of death: Niterói, Brazil
- Position: Right-back

Senior career*
Years	Team	Apps	(Gls)
1956–1963	Fluminense		
1964–1965	Portuguesa		
1965–1967	Corinthians		
1967	Vasco da Gama		
1968	Alianza Lima		
1970	Campo Grande		

International career
	Brazil	4	(0)
Medal record
Men's Football
Representing Brazil
FIFA World Cup
Winner	1962 Chile
- * Club domestic league appearances and goals

Jair Marinho de Oliveira (17 July 1936 – 7 March 2020), known as Jair Marinho, was a Brazilian footballer who played as a right-back.

He earned four caps for the Brazil national team. He was part of the 1962 FIFA World Cup winning squad, but he did not play any matches during the tournament.

Marinho died on 7 March 2020, aged 83.

== Honours ==
=== Club ===
Fluminense

- Campeonato Carioca: 1959
- Torneio Rio – São Paulo: 1957, 1960

=== International ===
Brazil

- Copa O'Higgins: 1961
- Copa Oswaldo Cruz: 1961
- FIFA World Cup: 1962
