= Rodolfo Pini =

Uruguayan footballer (1926-2000)

Personal information
- Full name: Rodolfo Pini Giovio
- Date of birth: November 12, 1926
- Place of birth: Uruguay
- Date of death: May 31, 2000 (aged 73)
- Position: Midfielder

Youth career
- Laureles F.C.

Senior career*
| Years | Team | Apps | (Gls) |
| 1939-1951 | Nacional | | |

International career
| 1944–1950 | Uruguay | 6 | (2) |
Medal record
Representing Uruguay
FIFA World Cup
| Winner | 1950 Brazil |
- * Club domestic league appearances and goals

Rodolfo Pini Giovio (12 November 1926 – 31 May 2000) was a Uruguayan footballer, who played for Club Nacional de Football.

For the Uruguay national football team, he was part of the 1950 FIFA World Cup winning team, but did not play in any matches in the tournament.
