= Heinz Kubsch =

German footballer

Personal information
- Date of birth: 20 July 1930
- Place of birth: Essen, Germany
- Date of death: 24 October 1993 (aged 63)
- Position: Goalkeeper

Youth career
- 1939–: Sportfreunde Katernberg

Senior career*
Years	Team	Apps	(Gls)
–1951	Sportfreunde Katernberg		
1951–1961	FK Pirmasens		

International career
1954–1956	West Germany	3	(0)
Medal record
Representing West Germany
FIFA World Cup
Winner	1954 Switzerland
- * Club domestic league appearances and goals

Heinz Kubsch (20 July 1930, Essen – 24 October 1993) was a German football goalkeeper.

He was part of the West German team that won the 1954 FIFA World Cup. In total he earned three caps for West Germany. During his club career he played for FK Pirmasens.

During the 1954 FIFA World Cup, Kubsch almost became the starter of the German team. The standard goalkeeper Toni Turek had shown some weaknesses in the first game against Turkey and the second goalkeeper Heinrich Kwiatkowski had conceded eight goals in the game against Hungary, which made Sepp Herberger consider giving Kubsch a chance in the second game against Turkey. However Kubsch was injured between matchdays after a boat trip. Kubsch stumbled badly and injured his shoulder on a concrete staircase, which impeded any chance of Kubsch getting a chance to start.

As a goalkeeper, Kubsch was very agile and showed fast reactions on the goalline. When he debuted in 1948 at the age of 17, he became the youngest goalkeeper in the Oberliga. He ended his career in April 1961 after having played in 222 Oberliga games.
