= Ulrich Biesinger =

German footballer

Personal information
- Full name: Ulrich Biesinger
- Date of birth: 6 August 1933
- Place of birth: Augsburg-Oberhausen, Germany
- Date of death: 18 June 2011 (aged 77)
- Place of death: Augsburg, Germany
- Height: 1.78 m (5 ft 10 in)
- Position: Forward

Senior career*
Years	Team	Apps	(Gls)
1952–1960	BC Augsburg		
1960–1963	SSV Reutlingen	78	(44)
1963–1965	BC Augsburg		
1965–1966	Schwaben Augsburg		

International career
1953–1959	West Germany B	7	(3)
1954–1959	West Germany	7	(2)
Medal record
Representing West Germany
FIFA World Cup
Winner	1954 Switzerland
- * Club domestic league appearances and goals

Ulrich "Uli" Biesinger (6 August 1933 – 18 June 2011) was a German footballer who played at both professional and international levels as a forward.

== Career ==
Born in Augsburg-Oberhausen, Biesinger was an attacker for BC Augsburg. Between 1954 and 1958, he played in seven matches for the Germany national team and scored two goals. He was the youngest player of the German team for the 1954 FIFA World Cup.

Biesinger played the position of center forward. He scored 105 goals in 187 games in the Oberliga Süd between his debut in 1952 and 1959, when BC Augsburg were relegated.
