= Ángel Melogno =

Uruguayan footballer (1905-1945)

Personal information
- Full name: Miguel Ángel Melogno
- Date of birth: 22 March 1905
- Place of birth: Uruguay
- Date of death: 27 March 1945 (aged 40)
- Position: Midfielder

Senior career*
Years	Team	Apps	(Gls)
1930-?	Bella Vista Montevideo		

International career
1924–1930	Uruguay	5	(0)
Medal record
Men's football
Representing Uruguay
Olympic Games
Gold medal – first place	1928 Amsterdam	Team
FIFA World Cup
Winner	1930 Uruguay
- * Club domestic league appearances and goals

Miguel Ángel Melogno (22 March 1905 – 27 March 1945) was a Uruguayan footballer who played 5 matches for Uruguay national team. He was part of the team which won the first ever World Cup in 1930. He has also won the gold medal with national team in 1928 Olympics, but he did not play in any matches. He played club football for Bella Vista Montevideo.
