= Luis Rijo =

Uruguayan footballer (1927-2001)

Personal information
- Full name: Luis Alberto Rijo
- Date of birth: September 28, 1927
- Date of death: May 8, 2001 (aged 73)
- Position: Forward

Senior career*
Years	Team	Apps	(Gls)
- Central Español

International career
1950	Uruguay	0	(0)
Medal record
Representing Uruguay
FIFA World Cup
Winner	1950 Brazil
- * Club domestic league appearances and goals

Luis Alberto Rijo (28 September 1927 – 8 May 2001) was a Uruguayan footballer, who played as a forward for Central Español. He never played any international matches in his career, but was part of the Uruguay national team which won 1950 FIFA World Cup.
