= Paul Mebus =

German footballer (1920–1993)

Personal information
- Date of birth: 9 June 1920
- Place of birth: Düsseldorf-Benrath, Germany
- Date of death: 11 December 1993 (aged 73)
- Height: 1.68 m (5 ft 6 in)
- Position: Midfielder

Senior career*
Years	Team	Apps	(Gls)
1945–1951	VfL 06 Benrath		
1951–1956	1. FC Köln		

International career
1951–1954	West Germany	6	(0)
Medal record
Representing West Germany
FIFA World Cup
Winner	1954 Switzerland
- * Club domestic league appearances and goals

Paul Mebus (9 June 1920 – 11 December 1993) was a German footballer.

He was part of the West Germany national team that won the 1954 FIFA World Cup. He earned six caps for West Germany and played twice for the German 'B-team'. During his club career he played for VfL 06 Benrath and 1. FC Köln.

== Career ==
Mebus was playing both as an inside forward and as a half back. In the latter role, he was considered to be one of the best in German football during the 1950s. Although he was a technically sound player, he failed to become a regular for West Germany mostly because his fitness was not the best. For Germany, he mostly played as a left half back, a position in which he had strong competition in Karl Mai. His only game in the 1954 FIFA World Cup was in the 8–3 defeat to Hungary. After that game West Germany coach Sepp Herberger caught Mebus singing under the shower. In face of the harsh defeat, this was unacceptable to Herberger and Mebus was not called up again by Herberger in the coming years.

Mebus finished his career in 1956. Afterwards he started coaching SV Troisdorf 05 SC Euskirchen and SV Schlebusch in the 1960s as well as Tura Hennef, TuS Höhenhaus and Eitorf 09 in the 1970s. He died in 1993.
