= Emilio Recoba =

Uruguayan footballer (1904-1992)

Personal information
- Full name: Emilio Recoba Cambón
- Date of birth: November 3, 1904
- Place of birth: Uruguay
- Date of death: September 12, 1992 (aged 87)
- Position: Defender

Youth career
- Charley

Senior career*
Years	Team	Apps	(Gls)
1925-1932	Nacional		
1934	Nacional		

International career
1926–1929	Uruguay	5	(0)
Medal record
Men's football
Representing Uruguay
FIFA World Cup
Winner	1930 Uruguay
South American Championship
Winner	1926 Chile
- * Club domestic league appearances and goals

Emilio Recoba Cambón (born 3 November 1904 in Montevideo — 12 September 1992) was a Uruguayan footballer. He was part of the team that won the first World Cup in 1930 for Uruguay, but did not play any matches in the tournament.

He was a club player of Nacional. When Emilio Recoba died on 12 September 1992 he was the last surviving member of Uruguay's 1930 World Cup-winning squad.
