= Aldo Olivieri =

Italian footballer (1910–2001)

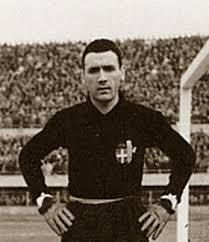

Personal information
- Date of birth: 2 October 1910
- Place of birth: San Michele Extra, Italy
- Date of death: 5 April 2001 (aged 90)
- Place of death: Lido di Camaiore, Italy
- Height: 1.78 m (5 ft 10 in)
- Position: Goalkeeper

Senior career*
Years	Team	Apps	(Gls)
1929–1933	Hellas Verona	99	(0)
1933–1934	Padova	8	(0)
1934–1938	Lucchese	121	(0)
1938–1942	Torino	81	(0)
1942–1943	Brescia	32	(0)
1943–1946	Viareggio	4	(0)
Total		345	(0)

International career
1936–1940	Italy	24	(0)

Managerial career
- 1950–1952: Inter Milan
- 1952–1953: Udinese
- 1953–1955: Juventus
- 1958–1959: Triestina
- 1959–1960: Hellas Verona
- 1967–1968: Casertana
Medal record
Italy
FIFA World Cup
Gold medal – first place	1938 France
- * Club domestic league appearances and goals

Aldo Olivieri (Italian pronunciation: [ˈaldo oliˈvjɛːri]; 2 October 1910 – 5 April 2001) was an Italian football goalkeeper from 1931 to 1943, and manager after World War II.

== Club career ==
Olivieri was born in San Michele Extra, Verona. He played for Hellas Verona, Lucchese, and Brescia in Serie B, and Torino in Serie A.

== International career ==
With the Italy national football team, Olivieri became World Champion in 1938.

== Style of play ==
A shot-stopper with efficient spring, Olivieri is regarded as one of Italy's greatest goalkeepers. Throughout his career he was known in particular for his quick reflexes, intelligence, and ability to rush off his line, and anticipate opposing forwards outside of his area, which earned him the nickname il Gatto Magico ("the Magic Cat"). He also excelled at coming out to block the ball.

== Death ==
He died in Lido di Camaiore at 90 years old.

== Honours ==
Italy

- FIFA World Cup: 1938

World Cup-winners status
Preceded by Piero Pasinati	Oldest living player 15 November 2000 – 5 April 2001	Succeeded by Mario Perazzolo
