= Bruno Chizzo =

Italian footballer (1916-1969)

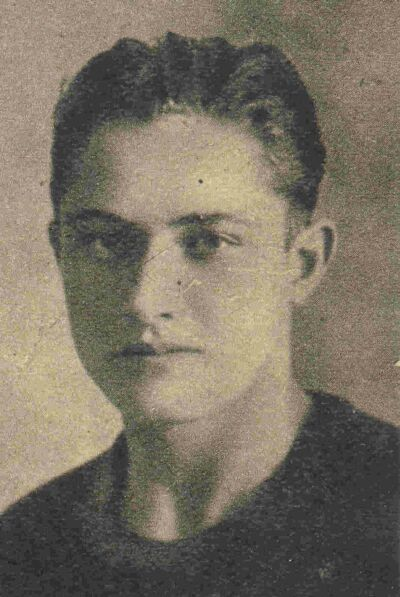

Personal information
- Full name: Bruno Chizzo
- Date of birth: 19 April 1916
- Place of birth: Udine, Italy
- Date of death: 14 August 1969 (aged 53)
- Height: 1.68 m (5 ft 6 in)
- Position: Midfielder

Senior career*
Years	Team	Apps	(Gls)
1933–35	Udinese	51	(0)
1935–39	Triestina	116	(11)
1939–40	A.C. Milan	25	(3)
1940–42	Genoa	11	(0)
1942–43	Anconitana	18	(2)
1944	Udinese	11	(1)
1945–47	Genoa	43	(4)
Total		275	(21)

International career
1938	Italy	0	(0)
Medal record
Italy
FIFA World Cup
Gold medal – first place	1938 France
- * Club domestic league appearances and goals

Bruno Chizzo (19 April 1916 – 14 August 1969) was an Italian association footballer who played as a midfielder.

== Club career ==
Born in Udine, Chizzo played in the 1930s and 1940s for Triestina, A.C. Milan, Genoa, Anconitana, and Udinese. He played 195 matches in Serie A and scored 18 goals.

== International career ==
With the Italy national football team, he was the youngest player selected to the 1938 FIFA World Cup squad and became world champion despite not playing a game throughout the tournament.

== Honours ==
=== Club ===
Udinese

- Serie A: 1934–35

=== International ===
Italy

- FIFA World Cup: 1938
