= 1930 FIFA World Cup Group 2 =

Football tournament group stage

Group 2 of the 1930 FIFA World Cup began on 14 July 1930 and concluded on 20 July 1930. Yugoslavia won the group, and advanced to the semi-finals. Brazil and Bolivia failed to advance.

During the first match, Yugoslavia unexpectedly beat group favorites, Brazil by A score of 2–1, they then proceeded to dominate their next match against Bolivia netting 4 goals. Brazil also beat Bolivia by a score of 4–0.

== Standings ==
Pos	Team	Pld	W	D	L	GF	GA	GD	Pts	Qualification
1	Yugoslavia	2	2	0	0	6	1	+5	4	Advance to the knockout stage
2	Brazil	2	1	0	1	5	2	+3	2	
3	Bolivia	2	0	0	2	0	8	−8	0	

Source: ESPN

== Matches ==
=== Yugoslavia vs Brazil ===
14 July 1930
12:45 UYT (UTC−03:30)

Yugoslavia	2–1	Brazil
Tirnanić 21'; Bek 30'		Preguinho 62'

Estadio Parque Central, Montevideo
Attendance: 24,059
Referee: Aníbal Tejada (Uruguay)

Yugoslavia
Brazil

GK	Milovan Jakšić
DF	Milutin Ivković (c)
DF	Dragoslav Mihajlović
MF	Milorad Arsenijević
MF	Ljubiša Stefanović
MF	Momčilo Đokić
FW	Aleksandar Tirnanić
FW	Blagoje Marjanović
FW	Ivan Bek
FW	Đorđe Vujadinović
FW	Branislav Sekulić
Manager:
Boško Simonović

GK	Joel
DF	Brilhante
DF	Itália
MF	Hermógenes
MF	Fausto
MF	Fernando
FW	Poly
FW	Nilo
FW	Araken
FW	Preguinho (c)
FW	Teóphilo
Manager:
Píndaro de Carvalho Rodrigues

Linesmen:
Ricardo Vallarino (Uruguay)
Thomas Balvay (France)

=== Yugoslavia vs Bolivia ===
17 July 1930
12:45 UYT (UTC−03:30)

Yugoslavia	4–0	Bolivia
Bek 60', 67'; Marjanović 65'; Vujadinović 85' (Note: This is one of several goals for which the statistical details are disputed. The goalscorers and timings used here are those of FIFA, the official record. Some other sources, such as RSSSF, state a different scorer, timing, or both.)

Estadio Parque Central, Montevideo
Attendance: 18,306
Referee: Francisco Mateucci (Uruguay)

Yugoslavia
Bolivia

GK	Milovan Jakšić
DF	Milutin Ivković (c)
DF	Dragoslav Mihajlović
MF	Milorad Arsenijević
MF	Ljubiša Stefanović
MF	Momčilo Đokić
FW	Aleksandar Tirnanić
FW	Blagoje Marjanović
FW	Ivan Bek
FW	Đorđe Vujadinović
FW	Dragutin Najdanović
Manager:
Boško Simonović

GK	Jesús Bermúdez
DF	Segundo Durandal
DF	Casiano Chavarría
MF	Juan Argote
MF	Diógenes Lara
MF	Jorge Valderrama
FW	Gumersindo Gómez
FW	José Bustamante
FW	Rafael Méndez (c)
FW	Mario Alborta
FW	René Fernández
Manager:
Ulises Saucedo

Linesmen:
Domingo Lombardi (Uruguay)
Alberto Warnken (Chile)

=== Brazil vs Bolivia ===
20 July 1930
13:00 UYT (UTC−03:30)

Brazil	4–0	Bolivia
Moderato 37', 73'; Preguinho 57', 83'

Estadio Centenario, Montevideo
Attendance: 25,466
Referee: Thomas Balvay (France)

Brazil
Bolivia

GK	Velloso
DF	Zé Luiz
DF	Itália
MF	Hermógenes
MF	Fausto
MF	Fernando
FW	Benedicto
FW	Russinho
FW	Carvalho Leite
FW	Preguinho (c)
FW	Moderato
Manager:
Píndaro de Carvalho Rodrigues

GK	Jesús Bermúdez
DF	Segundo Durandal
DF	Casiano Chavarría
MF	Renato Sáinz
MF	Diógenes Lara
MF	Jorge Valderrama
FW	Eduardo Reyes Ortiz
FW	José Bustamante
FW	Rafael Méndez (c)
FW	Mario Alborta
FW	René Fernández
Manager:
Ulises Saucedo

Linesmen:
Francisco Mateucci (Uruguay)
Gaspar Vallejo (Mexico)

== See also ==
- Bolivia at the FIFA World Cup
- Brazil at the FIFA World Cup
- Yugoslavia at the FIFA World Cup
