= 1926 South American Championship squads =

List of footballers

The following squads were named for the 1926 South American Championship that took place in Chile.

== Argentina ==
Head Coach:

No.	Pos.	Player	Date of birth (age)	Caps	Goals	Club
—	GK	Octavio Díaz	7 October 1900 (aged 26)	2	0	(Argentine Football Association) Rosario Central
—	DF	Ludovico Bidoglio	5 February 1900 (aged 26)	20	0	(Argentine Football Association) Boca Juniors
—	DF	Roberto Cochrane		2	0	(Argentine Football Association) Tiro Federal
—	DF	Ángel Médici	20 December 1897 (aged 28)	22	0	(Argentine Football Association) Boca Juniors
—	DF	Ramón Muttis	12 March 1899 (aged 27)	7	0	(Argentine Football Association) Boca Juniors
—	MF	Silvestre Conti	17 May 1902 (aged 24)	0	0	(Argentine Football Association) Nacional (R)
—	MF	Mario Fortunato	19 March 1905 (aged 21)	7	0	(Argentine Football Association) Boca Juniors
—	MF	Gabino Sosa	4 October 1899 (aged 27)	10	1	(Argentine Football Association) Central Córdoba (R)
—	MF	Luis Vaccaro	6 November 1898 (aged 27)	13	0	(Argentine Football Association) Argentinos Juniors
—	FW	Roberto Cherro	23 February 1907 (aged 19)	0	0	(Argentine Football Association) Boca Juniors
—	FW	Antonio De Miguel	25 June 1899 (aged 27)	8	0	(Argentine Football Association) Tiro Federal
—	FW	Benjamín Delgado	1 June 1897 (aged 29)	5	0	(Argentine Football Association) Boca Juniors
—	FW	Feliciano Perducca	9 June 1901 (aged 25)	3	0	(Argentine Football Association) Temperly
—	FW	Domingo Tarasconi	20 December 1903 (aged 22)	13	6	(Argentine Football Association) Boca Juniors

== Bolivia ==
Player coach: (Bolivia) Jorge Luis Valderrama

No.	Pos.	Player	Date of birth (age)	Caps	Goals	Club
—	FW	Teófilo Aguilar		0	0	(Bolivian Football Federation)
—	FW	Mario Alborta	19 September 1910 (aged 16)	0	0	(Bolivian Football Federation) Club Bolívar
—	MF	Eliseo Angulo		0	0	(Bolivian Football Federation)
—	GK	Hernán Araníbar		0	0	(Bolivian Football Federation)
—	GK	Jesús Bermúdez	24 January 1902 (aged 24)	0	0	(Bolivian Football Federation) Oruro Royal
—	FW	José Bustamante	1 January 1907 (aged 19)	0	0	(Bolivian Football Federation) Club Litoral
—	DF	Casiano José Chavarría	3 August 1901 (aged 25)	0	0	(Bolivian Football Federation) Calavera La Paz
—	MF	Diógenes Lara	6 April 1903 (aged 23)	0	0	(Bolivian Football Federation) Club Bolívar
—	FW	Rafael Méndez	1 January 1904 (aged 22)	0	0	(Bolivian Football Federation) Universitario de La Paz
—	MF	Renato Sáinz	14 December 1899 (aged 26)	0	0	(Bolivian Football Federation) Colegio Militar
—	MF	Carlos Soto		0	0	(Bolivian Football Federation)
—	DF	Jorge Soto		0	0	(Bolivian Football Federation)
—	DF	Alberto Urriolagoitía		0	0	(Bolivian Football Federation)
—	MF	Jorge Luis Valderrama	12 December 1906 (aged 19)	0	0	(Bolivian Football Federation) Oruro Royal

== Chile ==
Head coach: (Italy) José Rosetti

No.	Pos.	Player	Date of birth (age)	Caps	Goals	Club
—	GK	Roberto Cortés	2 February 1905 (aged 21)	0	0	(Football Federation of Chile) Chilex
—	GK	Carlos Hill	6 November 1906 (aged 19)	0	0	(Football Federation of Chile) Santiago Wanderers
—	DF	Manuel Figueroa	8 May 1904 (aged 22)	0	0	(Football Federation of Chile) Arturo Fernández Vial
—	DF	Víctor Morales	10 May 1905 (aged 21)	3	0	(Football Federation of Chile) Colo-Colo
—	DF	Ulises Poirrier	2 February 1897 (aged 29)	11	0	(Football Federation of Chile) La Cruz
—	MF	Francisco Sánchez		0	0	(Football Federation of Chile) Arturo Fernández Vial
—	DF	Leoncio Veloso	16 August 1897 (aged 29)	0	0	(Football Federation of Chile) Bádminton
—	DF	Oscar González	24 August 1894 (aged 32)	4	0	(Football Federation of Chile) La Cruz
—	MF	Guillermo Saavedra	5 November 1903 (aged 22)	0	0	(Football Federation of Chile) Caupolicán
—	MF	Víctor Toro		6	0	(Football Federation of Chile) 10 de Julio
—	FW	David Arellano	29 July 1901 (aged 25)	2	1	(Football Federation of Chile) Colo-Colo
—	FW	Carlos García	23 January 1902 (aged 24)	0	0	(Football Federation of Chile) Everton
—	FW	Humberto Moreno	28 October 1903 (aged 22)	0	0	(Football Federation of Chile) Colo-Colo
—	DF	Horacio Muñoz	18 May 1896 (aged 30)	8	0	(Football Federation of Chile) Arturo Fernández Vial
—	FW	José Olguín	2 August 1903 (aged 23)	3	0	(Football Federation of Chile) Colo-Colo
—		Manuel Ramírez		3	0	(Football Federation of Chile) The Commercial
—	DF	Guillermo Subiabre	25 February 1903 (aged 23)	0	0	(Football Federation of Chile) Santiago Wanderers

== Paraguay ==
Head coach: (Paraguay) Manuel Fleitas Solich

No.	Pos.	Player	Date of birth (age)	Caps	Goals	Club
—	FW	Bartolomé Brizuela		4	0	(Paraguayan Football Association) Nacional
—	GK	Modesto Denis	9 March 1901 (aged 25)	13	0	(Paraguayan Football Association) Nacional
—	FW	Diógenes Domínguez	1 January 1902 (aged 24)	0	0	(Paraguayan Football Association) Sportivo Luqueño
—		Francisco Duarte		0	0	(Paraguayan Football Association)
—	MF	Manuel Fleitas Solich	30 December 1900 (aged 25)	15	2	(Paraguayan Football Association) Nacional
—	FW	Luis Fretes		13	3	(Paraguayan Football Association) Guaraní
—	FW	Ildefonso López		14	4	(Paraguayan Football Association) Guaraní
—	FW	Gaspar Nessi		3	0	(Paraguayan Football Association) Libertad
—	FW	Lino Nessi	1 January 1904 (aged 22)	4	0	(Paraguayan Football Association) Libertad
—		Ceferino Ramírez		0	0	(Paraguayan Football Association)
—		Pablo Ramírez		0	0	(Paraguayan Football Association)
—	GK	Manuel Recalde		0	0	(Paraguayan Football Association) Libertad
—		Juan Rolón		0	0	(Paraguayan Football Association)
—	DF	Axel Sirvent		3	0	(Paraguayan Football Association) Olimpia
—	FW	Luis Vargas Peña	1 January 1905 (aged 21)	0	0	(Paraguayan Football Association) Olimpia

== Uruguay ==
Head coach: (Uruguay) Ernesto Fígoli

No.	Pos.	Player	Date of birth (age)	Caps	Goals	Club
—	GK	Fausto Batignani	2 July 1903 (aged 23)	5	0	(Uruguayan Football Association) Liverpool
—	GK	Andrés Mazali	22 July 1902 (aged 24)	10	0	(Uruguayan Football Association) Nacional
—	DF	Abraham Lobos		0	0	(Uruguayan Football Association) Lito
—	DF	José Nasazzi	24 March 1901 (aged 25)	13	0	(Uruguayan Football Association) Bella Vista
—	DF	Emilio Recoba	3 November 1904 (aged 21)	0	0	(Uruguayan Football Association) Nacional
—	DF	Domingo Tejera	9 July 1899 (aged 27)	13	0	(Uruguayan Football Association) Montevideo Wanderers
—	MF	José Andrade	22 November 1901 (aged 24)	11	0	(Uruguayan Football Association) Nacional
—	MF	Pascual Cabrera		1	0	(Uruguayan Football Association) Rampla Juniors
—	MF	Lorenzo Fernández	20 May 1900 (aged 26)	0	0	(Uruguayan Football Association) Capurro
—	DF	Alfredo Ghierra	31 August 1891 (aged 35)	12	0	(Uruguayan Football Association) Universal
—	MF	José Vanzzino	5 July 1893 (aged 33)	28	0	(Uruguayan Football Association) Nacional
—	FW	René Borjas	23 December 1897 (aged 28)	3	0	(Uruguayan Football Association) Montevideo Wanderers
—	FW	Hector Castro	29 November 1904 (aged 21)	2	3	(Uruguayan Football Association) Nacional
—	FW	Nicolás Conti	1 January 1904 (aged 22)	0	0	(Uruguayan Football Association) Montevideo Wanderers
—	FW	Ángel Romano	2 August 1893 (aged 33)	62	27	(Uruguayan Football Association) Nacional
—	FW	Zoilo Saldombide	26 October 1903 (aged 22)	3	1	(Uruguayan Football Association) Montevideo Wanderers
—	FW	Héctor Scarone	26 November 1898 (aged 27)	33	16	(Uruguayan Football Association) Nacional
—	FW	Santos Urdinarán	30 March 1900 (aged 26)	9	1	(Uruguayan Football Association) Nacional
