= List of managers at the FIFA World Cup =

This is a list of all managers who have appeared in the FIFA World Cup, the most prestigious tournament for national teams in association football. Over 400 individuals have managed or co-managed a team in at least one match in the competition.

== Statistics and notable achievements ==
Carlos Alberto Parreira is the manager who has taken part in the most editions of the World Cup, with six tournaments between 1982 and 2010. Parreira also shares with Bora Milutinović the record for most different nations managed in the World Cup, with five each. Didier Deschamps holds the records both for the most matches managed (27) and most matches won (20), all with France from 2014 to 2026.

Twenty-two managers have won the World Cup, with Vittorio Pozzo being the only one to do so twice, in 1934 and 1938 with Italy.

The first person to have the roles of both a player and a manager in the tournament was Milorad Arsenijević, who played for Yugoslavia in 1930 and then coached them in 1950. Three men who lifted the trophy as players went on to also triumph as managers: Brazil's Mário Zagallo in 1970, West Germany's Franz Beckenbauer in 1990 and France's Didier Deschamps in 2018.

The youngest manager to appear in the competition was Juan José Tramutola, who co-managed Argentina at age 27 in 1930, while the oldest was Dick Advocaat, who managed Curaçao at age 78 in 2026.

While many of the participating nations have on one or more occasions employed foreign managers for the World Cup, four-time winners Germany have always been led by natives. On the other side of the spectrum, Ecuador is the team with the most participations always coached by foreigners – five, always with managers coming from fellow South American countries. No foreign manager has ever won the World Cup, and only two have reached the final: Englishman George Raynor with Sweden in 1958, and Austrian Ernst Happel with the Netherlands in 1978.

== By team ==
Below, the teams are listed in decreasing order of number of appearances in the World Cup.

Skip to section
23:
- Brazil
21:
- Germany
19:
- Argentina
18:
- Italy
- Mexico
17:
- England
- France
- Spain
15:
- Belgium
- Uruguay
13:
- Serbia
- Sweden
- Switzerland
12:
- Netherlands
- South Korea
- United States
11:
- Russia
10:
- Czech Republic
9:
- Chile
- Hungary
- Paraguay
- Poland
- Portugal
- Scotland
8:
- Austria
- Cameroon
- Japan
7:
- Australia
- Bulgaria
- Colombia
- Croatia
- Iran
- Morocco
- Romania
- Saudi Arabia
- Tunisia
6:
- Costa Rica
- Denmark
- Nigeria
5:
- Algeria
- Ecuador
- Ghana
- Peru
4:
- Egypt
- Ivory Coast
- Norway
- Senegal
- South Africa
3:
- Bolivia
- Canada
- Greece
- Honduras
- New Zealand
- Northern Ireland
- Republic of Ireland
- Turkey
2:
- Bosnia and Herzegovina
- DR Congo
- El Salvador
- Haiti
- Iraq
- North Korea
- Panama
- Qatar
- Slovenia
- Wales
1:
- Angola
- Cape Verde
- China
- Cuba
- Curaçao
- East Germany
- Iceland
- Indonesia
- Israel
- Jamaica
- Jordan
- Kuwait
- Slovakia
- Togo
- Trinidad and Tobago
- Ukraine
- United Arab Emirates
- Uzbekistan

=== Brazil ===
| Year | Manager |
|---|---|
| 1930 | (Brazil) Píndaro |
| 1934 | (Brazil) Luiz Vinhaes |
| 1938 | (Brazil) Adhemar Pimenta |
| 1950 | (Brazil) Flávio Costa |
| 1954 | (Brazil) Zezé Moreira |
| 1958 | (Brazil) Vicente Feola |
| 1962 | (Brazil) Aymoré Moreira |
| 1966 | (Brazil) Vicente Feola |
| 1970 | (Brazil) Mário Zagallo |
| 1974 | (Brazil) Mário Zagallo |
| 1978 | (Brazil) Cláudio Coutinho |
| 1982 | (Brazil) Telê Santana |
| 1986 | (Brazil) Telê Santana |
| 1990 | (Brazil) Sebastião Lazaroni |
| 1994 | (Brazil) Carlos Alberto Parreira |
| 1998 | (Brazil) Mário Zagallo |
| 2002 | (Brazil) Luiz Felipe Scolari |
| 2006 | (Brazil) Carlos Alberto Parreira |
| 2010 | (Brazil) Dunga |
| 2014 | (Brazil) Luiz Felipe Scolari |
| 2018 | (Brazil) Tite |
| 2022 | (Brazil) Tite |
| 2026 | (Italy) Carlo Ancelotti |

=== Germany ===
Including West Germany (1954–1990).

| Year | Manager |
|---|---|
| 1934 | (Germany) Otto Nerz |
| 1938 | (Germany) Sepp Herberger |
| 1954 | (West Germany) Sepp Herberger |
| 1958 | (West Germany) Sepp Herberger |
| 1962 | (West Germany) Sepp Herberger |
| 1966 | (West Germany) Helmut Schön |
| 1970 | (West Germany) Helmut Schön |
| 1974 | (West Germany) Helmut Schön |
| 1978 | (West Germany) Helmut Schön |
| 1982 | (West Germany) Jupp Derwall |
| 1986 | (West Germany) Franz Beckenbauer |
| 1990 | (West Germany) Franz Beckenbauer |
| 1994 | (Germany) Berti Vogts |
| 1998 | (Germany) Berti Vogts |
| 2002 | (Germany) Rudi Völler |
| 2006 | (Germany) Jürgen Klinsmann |
| 2010 | (Germany) Joachim Löw |
| 2014 | (Germany) Joachim Löw |
| 2018 | (Germany) Joachim Löw |
| 2022 | (Germany) Hansi Flick |
| 2026 | (Germany) Julian Nagelsmann |

=== Argentina ===
| Year | Manager |
|---|---|
| 1930 | (Argentina) Francisco Olazar (Argentina) Juan José Tramutola |
| 1934 | (Italy) Felipe Pascucci |
| 1958 | (Argentina) Guillermo Stábile |
| 1962 | (Argentina) Juan Carlos Lorenzo |
| 1966 | (Argentina) Juan Carlos Lorenzo |
| 1974 | (Argentina) Vladislao Cap |
| 1978 | (Argentina) César Luis Menotti |
| 1982 | (Argentina) César Luis Menotti |
| 1986 | (Argentina) Carlos Bilardo |
| 1990 | (Argentina) Carlos Bilardo |
| 1994 | (Argentina) Alfio Basile |
| 1998 | (Argentina) Daniel Passarella |
| 2002 | (Argentina) Marcelo Bielsa |
| 2006 | (Argentina) José Pékerman |
| 2010 | (Argentina) Diego Maradona |
| 2014 | (Argentina) Alejandro Sabella |
| 2018 | (Argentina) Jorge Sampaoli |
| 2022 | (Argentina) Lionel Scaloni |
| 2026 | (Argentina) Lionel Scaloni |

=== Italy ===
| Year | Manager |
|---|---|
| 1934 | (Italy) Vittorio Pozzo |
| 1938 | (Italy) Vittorio Pozzo |
| 1950 | (Italy) Ferruccio Novo |
| 1954 | (Hungary) Lajos Czeizler |
| 1962 | (Italy) Paolo Mazza (Italy) Giovanni Ferrari |
| 1966 | (Italy) Edmondo Fabbri |
| 1970 | (Italy) Ferruccio Valcareggi |
| 1974 | (Italy) Ferruccio Valcareggi |
| 1978 | (Italy) Enzo Bearzot |
| 1982 | (Italy) Enzo Bearzot |
| 1986 | (Italy) Enzo Bearzot |
| 1990 | (Italy) Azeglio Vicini |
| 1994 | (Italy) Arrigo Sacchi |
| 1998 | (Italy) Cesare Maldini |
| 2002 | (Italy) Giovanni Trapattoni |
| 2006 | (Italy) Marcello Lippi |
| 2010 | (Italy) Marcello Lippi |
| 2014 | (Italy) Cesare Prandelli |

=== Mexico ===
| Year | Manager |
|---|---|
| 1930 | (Spain) (Mexico) Juan Luque de Serrallonga |
| 1950 | (Mexico) Octavio Vial |
| 1954 | (Spain) Antonio López Herranz |
| 1958 | (Mexico) Ignacio Trelles |
| 1962 | (Mexico) Ignacio Trelles |
| 1966 | (Mexico) Ignacio Trelles |
| 1970 | (Mexico) Raúl Cárdenas |
| 1978 | (Mexico) José Antonio Roca |
| 1986 | (Socialist Federal Republic of Yugoslavia) Bora Milutinović |
| 1994 | (Mexico) Miguel Mejía Barón |
| 1998 | (Mexico) Manuel Lapuente |
| 2002 | (Mexico) Javier Aguirre |
| 2006 | (Argentina) Ricardo La Volpe |
| 2010 | (Mexico) Javier Aguirre |
| 2014 | (Mexico) Miguel Herrera |
| 2018 | (Colombia) Juan Carlos Osorio |
| 2022 | (Argentina) Gerardo Martino |
| 2026 | (Mexico) Javier Aguirre |

=== England ===
| Year | Manager |
|---|---|
| 1950 | (England) Walter Winterbottom |
| 1954 | (England) Walter Winterbottom |
| 1958 | (England) Walter Winterbottom |
| 1962 | (England) Walter Winterbottom |
| 1966 | (England) Alf Ramsey |
| 1970 | (England) Alf Ramsey |
| 1982 | (England) Ron Greenwood |
| 1986 | (England) Bobby Robson |
| 1990 | (England) Bobby Robson |
| 1998 | (England) Glenn Hoddle |
| 2002 | (Sweden) Sven-Göran Eriksson |
| 2006 | (Sweden) Sven-Göran Eriksson |
| 2010 | (Italy) Fabio Capello |
| 2014 | (England) Roy Hodgson |
| 2018 | (England) Gareth Southgate |
| 2022 | (England) Gareth Southgate |
| 2026 | (Germany) Thomas Tuchel |

=== France ===
| Year | Manager |
|---|---|
| 1930 | (France) Raoul Caudron |
| 1934 | (England) Sid Kimpton |
| 1938 | (France) Gaston Barreau |
| 1954 | (France) Pierre Pibarot |
| 1958 | (France) Albert Batteux |
| 1966 | (France) Henri Guérin |
| 1978 | (France) Michel Hidalgo |
| 1982 | (France) Michel Hidalgo |
| 1986 | (France) Henri Michel |
| 1998 | (France) Aimé Jacquet |
| 2002 | (France) Roger Lemerre |
| 2006 | (France) Raymond Domenech |
| 2010 | (France) Raymond Domenech |
| 2014 | (France) Didier Deschamps |
| 2018 | (France) Didier Deschamps |
| 2022 | (France) Didier Deschamps |
| 2026 | (France) Didier Deschamps (France) Guy Stéphan (Note: During the tournament Deschamps was not present for one match due to personal reasons, for which his assistant Stéphan took over as stand-in manager.) |

=== Spain ===
| Year | Manager |
|---|---|
| 1934 | (Spain) Amadeo García |
| 1950 | (Spain) Guillermo Eizaguirre |
| 1962 | (Argentina) (France) Helenio Herrera |
| 1966 | (Spain) José Villalonga |
| 1978 | (Hungary) (Spain) László Kubala |
| 1982 | (Uruguay) (Spain) José Santamaría |
| 1986 | (Spain) Miguel Muñoz |
| 1990 | (Spain) Luis Suárez |
| 1994 | (Spain) Javier Clemente |
| 1998 | (Spain) Javier Clemente |
| 2002 | (Spain) José Antonio Camacho |
| 2006 | (Spain) Luis Aragonés |
| 2010 | (Spain) Vicente del Bosque |
| 2014 | (Spain) Vicente del Bosque |
| 2018 | (Spain) Fernando Hierro |
| 2022 | (Spain) Luis Enrique |
| 2026 | (Spain) Luis de la Fuente |

=== Belgium ===
| Year | Manager |
|---|---|
| 1930 | (Belgium) Hector Goetinck |
| 1934 | (Belgium) Hector Goetinck |
| 1938 | (England) Jack Butler |
| 1954 | (Scotland) Doug Livingstone |
| 1970 | (Belgium) Raymond Goethals |
| 1982 | (Belgium) Guy Thys |
| 1986 | (Belgium) Guy Thys |
| 1990 | (Belgium) Guy Thys |
| 1994 | (Belgium) Paul Van Himst |
| 1998 | (Belgium) Georges Leekens |
| 2002 | (Belgium) Robert Waseige |
| 2014 | (Belgium) Marc Wilmots |
| 2018 | (Spain) Roberto Martínez |
| 2022 | (Spain) Roberto Martínez |
| 2026 | (France) Rudi Garcia |

=== Uruguay ===
| Year | Manager |
|---|---|
| 1930 | (Uruguay) Alberto Suppici |
| 1950 | (Uruguay) Juan López |
| 1954 | (Uruguay) Juan López |
| 1962 | (Uruguay) Juan Carlos Corazzo |
| 1966 | (Uruguay) Ondino Viera |
| 1970 | (Argentina) (Uruguay) Juan Hohberg |
| 1974 | (Uruguay) Roberto Porta |
| 1986 | (Uruguay) Omar Borrás |
| 1990 | (Uruguay) Óscar Tabárez |
| 2002 | (Uruguay) Víctor Púa |
| 2010 | (Uruguay) Óscar Tabárez |
| 2014 | (Uruguay) Óscar Tabárez |
| 2018 | (Uruguay) Óscar Tabárez |
| 2022 | (Uruguay) Diego Alonso |
| 2026 | (Argentina) Marcelo Bielsa |

=== Serbia ===
Including Yugoslavia until 1990 and Serbia and Montenegro (FR Yugoslavia) in 1998–2006.

| Year | Manager |
|---|---|
| 1930 | (Kingdom of Yugoslavia) Boško Simonović |
| 1950 | (Socialist Federal Republic of Yugoslavia) Milorad Arsenijević |
| 1954 | (Socialist Federal Republic of Yugoslavia) Aleksandar Tirnanić |
| 1958 | (Socialist Federal Republic of Yugoslavia) Aleksandar Tirnanić |
| 1962 | (Socialist Federal Republic of Yugoslavia) Ljubomir Lovrić (Socialist Federal Republic of Yugoslavia) Prvoslav Mihajlović (Socialist Federal Republic of Yugoslavia) Hugo Ruševljanin |
| 1974 | (Socialist Federal Republic of Yugoslavia) Miljan Miljanić |
| 1982 | (Socialist Federal Republic of Yugoslavia) Miljan Miljanić |
| 1990 | (Socialist Federal Republic of Yugoslavia) Ivica Osim |
| 1998 | (Federal Republic of Yugoslavia) Slobodan Santrač |
| 2006 | (Serbia) Ilija Petković (Note: Although Serbia and Montenegro was represented at the 2006 World Cup, the country had ceased to exist a few days before the start of the tournament as its two constituent republics had become independent states, so Ratomir Dujković and Ilija Petković were legally Serbians at the time.) |
| 2010 | (Serbia) Radomir Antić |
| 2018 | (Serbia) Mladen Krstajić |
| 2022 | (Serbia) Dragan Stojković |

=== Sweden ===
| Year | Manager |
|---|---|
| 1934 | (Hungary) József Nagy |
| 1938 | (Hungary) József Nagy |
| 1950 | (England) George Raynor |
| 1958 | (England) George Raynor |
| 1970 | (Sweden) Orvar Bergmark |
| 1974 | (Sweden) Georg Ericson |
| 1978 | (Sweden) Georg Ericson |
| 1990 | (Sweden) Olle Nordin |
| 1994 | (Sweden) Tommy Svensson |
| 2002 | (Sweden) Lars Lagerbäck (Sweden) Tommy Söderberg |
| 2006 | (Sweden) Lars Lagerbäck |
| 2018 | (Sweden) Janne Andersson |
| 2026 | (England) Graham Potter |

=== Switzerland ===
| Year | Manager |
|---|---|
| 1934 | (Switzerland) Heinrich Müller |
| 1938 | (Germany) Karl Rappan (Note: Rappan was Austrian, but Austria was annexed into Nazi Germany at the time of the 1938 World Cup.) |
| 1950 | (Switzerland) Franco Andreoli |
| 1954 | (Austria) Karl Rappan |
| 1962 | (Austria) Karl Rappan |
| 1966 | (Italy) Alfredo Foni |
| 1994 | (England) Roy Hodgson |
| 2006 | (Switzerland) Köbi Kuhn |
| 2010 | (Germany) Ottmar Hitzfeld |
| 2014 | (Germany) Ottmar Hitzfeld |
| 2018 | (Bosnia and Herzegovina) (Switzerland) Vladimir Petković |
| 2022 | (Switzerland) Murat Yakin |
| 2026 | (Switzerland) Murat Yakin |

=== Netherlands ===
| Year | Manager |
|---|---|
| 1934 | (England) Bob Glendenning |
| 1938 | (England) Bob Glendenning |
| 1974 | (Netherlands) Rinus Michels |
| 1978 | (Austria) Ernst Happel |
| 1990 | (Netherlands) Leo Beenhakker |
| 1994 | (Netherlands) Dick Advocaat |
| 1998 | (Netherlands) Guus Hiddink |
| 2006 | (Netherlands) Marco van Basten |
| 2010 | (Netherlands) Bert van Marwijk |
| 2014 | (Netherlands) Louis van Gaal |
| 2022 | (Netherlands) Louis van Gaal |
| 2026 | (Netherlands) Ronald Koeman |

=== South Korea ===
| Year | Manager |
|---|---|
| 1954 | (South Korea) Kim Yong-sik |
| 1986 | (South Korea) Kim Jung-nam |
| 1990 | (South Korea) Lee Hoe-taik |
| 1994 | (South Korea) Kim Ho |
| 1998 | (South Korea) Cha Bum-kun (South Korea) Kim Pyung-seok (Note: Cha Bum-kun was sacked after two matches, and was replaced by Kim Pyung-seok for the remaining match.) |
| 2002 | (Netherlands) Guus Hiddink |
| 2006 | (Netherlands) Dick Advocaat |
| 2010 | (South Korea) Huh Jung-moo |
| 2014 | (South Korea) Hong Myung-bo |
| 2018 | (South Korea) Shin Tae-yong |
| 2022 | (Portugal) Paulo Bento (Portugal) Sérgio Costa (Note: During the tournament Bento was suspended for one match, for which his assistant Costa took over as stand-in manager.) |
| 2026 | (South Korea) Hong Myung-bo |

=== United States ===
| Year | Manager |
|---|---|
| 1930 | (Scotland) (United States) Robert Millar |
| 1934 | (Scotland) (United States) David Gould |
| 1950 | (Scotland) (United States) William Jeffrey |
| 1990 | (United States) Bob Gansler |
| 1994 | (Federal Republic of Yugoslavia) Bora Milutinović |
| 1998 | (United States) Steve Sampson |
| 2002 | (United States) Bruce Arena |
| 2006 | (United States) Bruce Arena |
| 2010 | (United States) Bob Bradley |
| 2014 | (Germany) Jürgen Klinsmann |
| 2022 | (United States) Gregg Berhalter |
| 2026 | (Argentina) Mauricio Pochettino |

=== Russia ===
Including Soviet Union until 1990.

| Year | Manager |
|---|---|
| 1958 | (Soviet Union) Gavriil Kachalin |
| 1962 | (Soviet Union) Gavriil Kachalin |
| 1966 | (Soviet Union) Nikolai Morozov |
| 1970 | (Soviet Union) Gavriil Kachalin |
| 1982 | (Soviet Union) Konstantin Beskov |
| 1986 | (Soviet Union) Valeriy Lobanovskyi |
| 1990 | (Soviet Union) Valeriy Lobanovskyi |
| 1994 | (Russia) Pavel Sadyrin |
| 2002 | (Russia) Oleg Romantsev |
| 2014 | (Italy) Fabio Capello |
| 2018 | (Russia) Stanislav Cherchesov |

=== Czech Republic ===
Including Czechoslovakia until 1990.

| Year | Manager |
|---|---|
| 1934 | (Czechoslovakia) Karel Petrů |
| 1938 | (Czechoslovakia) Josef Meissner |
| 1954 | (Czechoslovakia) Karol Borhy |
| 1958 | (Czechoslovakia) Karel Kolský |
| 1962 | (Austria) (Czechoslovakia) Rudolf Vytlačil |
| 1970 | (Czechoslovakia) Jozef Marko |
| 1982 | (Czechoslovakia) Jozef Vengloš |
| 1990 | (Czechoslovakia) Jozef Vengloš |
| 2006 | (Czech Republic) Karel Brückner |
| 2026 | (Czech Republic) Miroslav Koubek |

=== Chile ===
| Year | Manager |
|---|---|
| 1930 | (Hungary) György Orth |
| 1950 | (Chile) Alberto Buccicardi |
| 1962 | (Chile) Fernando Riera |
| 1966 | (Chile) Luis Álamos |
| 1974 | (Chile) Luis Álamos |
| 1982 | (Chile) Luis Santibáñez |
| 1998 | (Uruguay) (Chile) Nelson Acosta |
| 2010 | (Argentina) Marcelo Bielsa |
| 2014 | (Argentina) Jorge Sampaoli |

=== Hungary ===
| Year | Manager |
|---|---|
| 1934 | (Hungary) Ödön Nádas |
| 1938 | (Hungary) Károly Dietz (Hungary) Alfréd Schaffer |
| 1954 | (Hungary) Gusztáv Sebes |
| 1958 | (Hungary) Lajos Baróti |
| 1962 | (Hungary) Lajos Baróti |
| 1966 | (Hungary) Lajos Baróti |
| 1978 | (Hungary) Lajos Baróti |
| 1982 | (Hungary) Kálmán Mészöly |
| 1986 | (Hungary) György Mezey |

=== Paraguay ===
| Year | Manager |
|---|---|
| 1930 | (Argentina) José Durand Laguna |
| 1950 | (Paraguay) Manuel Fleitas Solich |
| 1958 | (Paraguay) Aurelio González |
| 1986 | (Paraguay) Cayetano Ré |
| 1998 | (Brazil) Paulo César Carpegiani |
| 2002 | (Italy) Cesare Maldini |
| 2006 | (Uruguay) Aníbal Ruiz |
| 2010 | (Argentina) Gerardo Martino |
| 2026 | (Argentina) Gustavo Alfaro |

=== Poland ===
| Year | Manager |
|---|---|
| 1938 | (Poland) Józef Kałuża |
| 1974 | (Poland) Kazimierz Górski |
| 1978 | (Poland) Jacek Gmoch |
| 1982 | (Poland) Antoni Piechniczek |
| 1986 | (Poland) Antoni Piechniczek |
| 2002 | (Poland) Jerzy Engel |
| 2006 | (Poland) Paweł Janas |
| 2018 | (Poland) Adam Nawałka |
| 2022 | (Poland) Czesław Michniewicz |

=== Portugal ===
| Year | Manager |
|---|---|
| 1966 | (Brazil) Otto Glória |
| 1986 | (Portugal) José Torres |
| 2002 | (Portugal) António Oliveira |
| 2006 | (Brazil) Luiz Felipe Scolari |
| 2010 | (Portugal) Carlos Queiroz |
| 2014 | (Portugal) Paulo Bento |
| 2018 | (Portugal) Fernando Santos |
| 2022 | (Portugal) Fernando Santos |
| 2026 | (Spain) Roberto Martínez |

=== Scotland ===
| Year | Manager |
|---|---|
| 1954 | (Scotland) Andy Beattie selection committee (Note: Beattie quit after the first match, and was replaced by a selection committee for the remaining match.) |
| 1958 | (Scotland) Dawson Walker (Note: Walker was officially only an acting manager. The official manager Matt Busby was seriously injured after the Munich air disaster earlier in 1958.) |
| 1974 | (Scotland) Willie Ormond |
| 1978 | (Scotland) Ally MacLeod |
| 1982 | (Scotland) Jock Stein |
| 1986 | (Scotland) Alex Ferguson |
| 1990 | (Scotland) Andy Roxburgh |
| 1998 | (Scotland) Craig Brown |
| 2026 | (Scotland) Steve Clarke |

=== Austria ===
| Year | Manager |
|---|---|
| 1934 | (Austria) Hugo Meisl |
| 1954 | (Austria) Walter Nausch |
| 1958 | (Austria) Josef Argauer |
| 1978 | (Austria) Helmut Senekowitsch |
| 1982 | (Austria) Felix Latzke (Austria) Georg Schmidt |
| 1990 | (Austria) Josef Hickersberger |
| 1998 | (Austria) Herbert Prohaska |
| 2026 | (Germany) Ralf Rangnick |

=== Cameroon ===
| Year | Manager |
|---|---|
| 1982 | (France) Jean Vincent |
| 1990 | (Soviet Union) Valery Nepomnyashchy |
| 1994 | (France) Henri Michel |
| 1998 | (France) Claude Le Roy |
| 2002 | (Germany) Winfried Schäfer |
| 2010 | (France) Paul Le Guen |
| 2014 | (Germany) Volker Finke |
| 2022 | (Cameroon) Rigobert Song |

=== Japan ===
| Year | Manager |
|---|---|
| 1998 | (Japan) Takeshi Okada |
| 2002 | (France) Philippe Troussier |
| 2006 | (Brazil) Zico |
| 2010 | (Japan) Takeshi Okada |
| 2014 | (Italy) Alberto Zaccheroni |
| 2018 | (Japan) Akira Nishino |
| 2022 | (Japan) Hajime Moriyasu |
| 2026 | (Japan) Hajime Moriyasu |

=== Australia ===
| Year | Manager |
|---|---|
| 1974 | (Socialist Federal Republic of Yugoslavia) (Australia) Rale Rasic |
| 2006 | (Netherlands) Guus Hiddink |
| 2010 | (Netherlands) Pim Verbeek |
| 2014 | (Australia) Ange Postecoglou |
| 2018 | (Netherlands) Bert van Marwijk |
| 2022 | (Australia) Graham Arnold |
| 2026 | (Australia) Tony Popovic |

=== Bulgaria ===
| Year | Manager |
|---|---|
| 1962 | (Bulgaria) Georgi Pachedzhiev |
| 1966 | (Austria) (Czechoslovakia) Rudolf Vytlačil |
| 1970 | (Bulgaria) Stefan Bozhkov |
| 1974 | (Bulgaria) Hristo Mladenov |
| 1986 | (Bulgaria) Ivan Vutsov |
| 1994 | (Bulgaria) Dimitar Penev |
| 1998 | (Bulgaria) Hristo Bonev |

=== Colombia ===
| Year | Manager |
|---|---|
| 1962 | (Argentina) Adolfo Pedernera |
| 1990 | (Colombia) Francisco Maturana |
| 1994 | (Colombia) Francisco Maturana |
| 1998 | (Colombia) Hernán Darío Gómez |
| 2014 | (Argentina) José Pékerman |
| 2018 | (Argentina) José Pékerman |
| 2026 | (Argentina) Néstor Lorenzo |

=== Croatia ===
| Year | Manager |
|---|---|
| 1998 | (Croatia) Miroslav Blažević |
| 2002 | (Croatia) Mirko Jozić |
| 2006 | (Croatia) Zlatko Kranjčar |
| 2014 | (Croatia) Niko Kovač |
| 2018 | (Croatia) Zlatko Dalić |
| 2022 | (Croatia) Zlatko Dalić |
| 2026 | (Croatia) Zlatko Dalić |

=== Iran ===
| Year | Manager |
|---|---|
| 1978 | (Iran) Heshmat Mohajerani |
| 1998 | (Iran) Jalal Talebi |
| 2006 | (Croatia) Branko Ivanković |
| 2014 | (Portugal) Carlos Queiroz |
| 2018 | (Portugal) Carlos Queiroz |
| 2022 | (Portugal) Carlos Queiroz |
| 2026 | (Iran) Amir Ghalenoei |

=== Morocco ===
| Year | Manager |
|---|---|
| 1970 | (Socialist Federal Republic of Yugoslavia) Blagoje Vidinić |
| 1986 | (Brazil) José Faria |
| 1994 | (Morocco) Abdellah Blinda |
| 1998 | (France) Henri Michel |
| 2018 | (France) Hervé Renard |
| 2022 | (France) (Morocco) Walid Regragui |
| 2026 | (Belgium) (Morocco) Mohamed Ouahbi |

=== Romania ===
| Year | Manager |
|---|---|
| 1930 | (Romania) Constantin Rădulescu |
| 1934 | (Austria) Josef Uridil (Romania) Constantin Rădulescu |
| 1938 | (Romania) Alexandru Săvulescu (Romania) Constantin Rădulescu |
| 1970 | (Romania) Angelo Niculescu |
| 1990 | (Romania) Emerich Jenei |
| 1994 | (Romania) Anghel Iordănescu |
| 1998 | (Romania) Anghel Iordănescu |

=== Saudi Arabia ===
| Year | Manager |
|---|---|
| 1994 | (Argentina) Jorge Solari |
| 1998 | (Brazil) Carlos Alberto Parreira (Saudi Arabia) Mohammed Al-Kharashy (Note: Parreira was sacked after two matches, and was replaced by Al-Kharashy for the remaining match.) |
| 2002 | (Saudi Arabia) Nasser Al-Johar |
| 2006 | (Brazil) Marcos Paquetá |
| 2018 | (Argentina) (Spain) Juan Antonio Pizzi |
| 2022 | (France) Hervé Renard |
| 2026 | (Greece) Georgios Donis |

=== Tunisia ===
| Year | Manager |
|---|---|
| 1978 | (Tunisia) Abdelmajid Chetali |
| 1998 | (Poland) Henryk Kasperczak (Tunisia) Ali Selmi (Note: Kasperczak was sacked after two matches, and was replaced by Selmi for the remaining match.) |
| 2002 | (Tunisia) Ammar Souayah |
| 2006 | (France) Roger Lemerre |
| 2018 | (Tunisia) Nabil Maâloul |
| 2022 | (Tunisia) Jalel Kadri |
| 2026 | (France) Sabri Lamouchi (France) Hervé Renard (Note: Lamouchi was sacked after one match, and was replaced by Renard for the remaining matches.) |

=== Costa Rica ===
| Year | Manager |
|---|---|
| 1990 | (Socialist Federal Republic of Yugoslavia) Bora Milutinović |
| 2002 | (Costa Rica) Alexandre Guimarães |
| 2006 | (Costa Rica) Alexandre Guimarães |
| 2014 | (Colombia) Jorge Luis Pinto |
| 2018 | (Costa Rica) Óscar Ramírez |
| 2022 | (Colombia) Luis Fernando Suárez |

=== Denmark ===
| Year | Manager |
|---|---|
| 1986 | (West Germany) Sepp Piontek |
| 1998 | (Sweden) Bo Johansson |
| 2002 | (Denmark) Morten Olsen |
| 2010 | (Denmark) Morten Olsen |
| 2018 | (Norway) Åge Hareide |
| 2022 | (Denmark) Kasper Hjulmand |

=== Nigeria ===
| Year | Manager |
|---|---|
| 1994 | (Netherlands) Clemens Westerhof |
| 1998 | (Federal Republic of Yugoslavia) Bora Milutinović |
| 2002 | (Nigeria) Festus Onigbinde |
| 2010 | (Sweden) Lars Lagerbäck |
| 2014 | (Nigeria) Stephen Keshi |
| 2018 | (Germany) Gernot Rohr |

=== Algeria ===
| Year | Manager |
|---|---|
| 1982 | (Algeria) Mahieddine Khalef (Algeria) Rachid Mekhloufi |
| 1986 | (Algeria) Rabah Saâdane |
| 2010 | (Algeria) Rabah Saâdane |
| 2014 | (Bosnia and Herzegovina) Vahid Halilhodžić |
| 2026 | (Bosnia and Herzegovina) (Switzerland) Vladimir Petković |

=== Ecuador ===
| Year | Manager |
|---|---|
| 2002 | (Colombia) Hernán Darío Gómez |
| 2006 | (Colombia) Luis Fernando Suárez |
| 2014 | (Colombia) Reinaldo Rueda |
| 2022 | (Argentina) Gustavo Alfaro |
| 2026 | (Argentina) Sebastián Beccacece |

=== Ghana ===
| Year | Manager |
|---|---|
| 2006 | (Serbia) Ratomir Dujković |
| 2010 | (Serbia) Milovan Rajevac |
| 2014 | (Ghana) James Kwesi Appiah |
| 2022 | (Germany) (Ghana) Otto Addo |
| 2026 | (Portugal) Carlos Queiroz |

=== Peru ===
| Year | Manager |
|---|---|
| 1930 | (Spain) Francisco Bru |
| 1970 | (Brazil) Didi |
| 1978 | (Peru) Marcos Calderón |
| 1982 | (Brazil) Tim |
| 2018 | (Argentina) Ricardo Gareca |

=== Egypt ===
| Year | Manager |
|---|---|
| 1934 | (Scotland) James McCrae |
| 1990 | (Egypt) Mahmoud El-Gohary |
| 2018 | (Argentina) Héctor Cúper |
| 2026 | (Egypt) Hossam Hassan |

=== Ivory Coast ===
| Year | Manager |
|---|---|
| 2006 | (France) Henri Michel |
| 2010 | (Sweden) Sven-Göran Eriksson |
| 2014 | (France) Sabri Lamouchi |
| 2026 | (France) (Ivory Coast) Emerse Faé |

=== Norway ===
| Year | Manager |
|---|---|
| 1938 | (Norway) Asbjørn Halvorsen |
| 1994 | (Norway) Egil Olsen |
| 1998 | (Norway) Egil Olsen |
| 2026 | (Norway) Ståle Solbakken |

=== Senegal ===
| Year | Manager |
|---|---|
| 2002 | (France) Bruno Metsu |
| 2018 | (Senegal) Aliou Cissé |
| 2022 | (Senegal) Aliou Cissé |
| 2026 | (Senegal) Pape Thiaw |

=== South Africa ===
| Year | Manager |
|---|---|
| 1998 | (France) Philippe Troussier |
| 2002 | (South Africa) Jomo Sono |
| 2010 | (Brazil) Carlos Alberto Parreira |
| 2026 | (Belgium) Hugo Broos |

=== Bolivia ===
| Year | Manager |
|---|---|
| 1930 | (Bolivia) Ulises Saucedo |
| 1950 | (Italy) Mario Pretto |
| 1994 | (Spain) Xabier Azkargorta |

=== Canada ===
| Year | Manager |
|---|---|
| 1986 | (England) Tony Waiters |
| 2022 | (England) John Herdman |
| 2026 | (United States) Jesse Marsch |

=== Greece ===
| Year | Manager |
|---|---|
| 1994 | (Greece) Alketas Panagoulias |
| 2010 | (Germany) Otto Rehhagel |
| 2014 | (Portugal) Fernando Santos |

=== Honduras ===
| Year | Manager |
|---|---|
| 1982 | (Honduras) Chelato Uclés |
| 2010 | (Colombia) Reinaldo Rueda |
| 2014 | (Colombia) Luis Fernando Suárez |

=== New Zealand ===
| Year | Manager |
|---|---|
| 1982 | (England) John Adshead |
| 2010 | (New Zealand) Ricki Herbert |
| 2026 | (England) Darren Bazeley |

=== Northern Ireland ===
| Year | Manager |
|---|---|
| 1958 | (Northern Ireland) Peter Doherty |
| 1982 | (Northern Ireland) Billy Bingham |
| 1986 | (Northern Ireland) Billy Bingham |

=== Republic of Ireland ===
| Year | Manager |
|---|---|
| 1990 | (England) Jack Charlton |
| 1994 | (England) Jack Charlton |
| 2002 | (Republic of Ireland) Mick McCarthy |

=== Turkey ===
| Year | Manager |
|---|---|
| 1954 | (Italy) Sandro Puppo |
| 2002 | (Turkey) Şenol Güneş |
| 2026 | (Italy) Vincenzo Montella |

=== Bosnia and Herzegovina ===
| Year | Manager |
|---|---|
| 2014 | (Bosnia and Herzegovina) Safet Sušić |
| 2026 | (Bosnia and Herzegovina) Sergej Barbarez |

=== DR Congo ===
Participated as Zaire in 1974.

| Year | Manager |
|---|---|
| 1974 | (Socialist Federal Republic of Yugoslavia) Blagoje Vidinić |
| 2026 | (France) Sébastien Desabre |

=== El Salvador ===
| Year | Manager |
|---|---|
| 1970 | (Chile) Hernán Carrasco |
| 1982 | (El Salvador) Pipo Rodríguez |

=== Haiti ===
| Year | Manager |
|---|---|
| 1974 | (Haiti) Antoine Tassy |
| 2026 | (France) Sébastien Migné |

=== Iraq ===
| Year | Manager |
|---|---|
| 1986 | (Brazil) Evaristo |
| 2026 | (Australia) Graham Arnold |

=== North Korea ===
| Year | Manager |
|---|---|
| 1966 | (North Korea) Myung Rye-hyun |
| 2010 | (North Korea) Kim Jong-hun |

=== Panama ===
| Year | Manager |
|---|---|
| 2018 | (Colombia) Hernán Darío Gómez |
| 2026 | (Denmark) (Spain) Thomas Christiansen |

=== Qatar ===
| Year | Manager |
|---|---|
| 2022 | (Spain) Félix Sánchez |
| 2026 | (Spain) Julen Lopetegui |

=== Slovenia ===
| Year | Manager |
|---|---|
| 2002 | (Slovenia) Srečko Katanec |
| 2010 | (Slovenia) Matjaž Kek |

=== Wales ===
| Year | Manager |
|---|---|
| 1958 | (Wales) Jimmy Murphy |
| 2022 | (Wales) Rob Page |

=== Angola ===
| Year | Manager |
|---|---|
| 2006 | (Angola) Oliveira Gonçalves |

=== Cape Verde ===
| Year | Manager |
|---|---|
| 2026 | (Cape Verde) Bubista |

=== China ===
| Year | Manager |
|---|---|
| 2002 | (Federal Republic of Yugoslavia) Bora Milutinović |

=== Cuba ===
| Year | Manager |
|---|---|
| 1938 | (Cuba) José Tapia |

=== Curaçao ===
| Year | Manager |
|---|---|
| 2026 | (Netherlands) Dick Advocaat |

=== East Germany ===
| Year | Manager |
|---|---|
| 1974 | (East Germany) Georg Buschner |

=== Iceland ===
| Year | Manager |
|---|---|
| 2018 | (Iceland) Heimir Hallgrímsson |

=== Indonesia ===
Participated as Dutch East Indies in 1938.

| Year | Manager |
|---|---|
| 1938 | (Netherlands) Jan Mastenbroek |

=== Israel ===
| Year | Manager |
|---|---|
| 1970 | (Israel) Emmanuel Scheffer |

=== Jamaica ===
| Year | Manager |
|---|---|
| 1998 | (Brazil) René Simões |

=== Jordan ===
| Year | Manager |
|---|---|
| 2026 | (Morocco) Jamal Sellami |

=== Kuwait ===
| Year | Manager |
|---|---|
| 1982 | (Brazil) Carlos Alberto Parreira |

=== Slovakia ===
| Year | Manager |
|---|---|
| 2010 | (Slovakia) Vladimír Weiss |

=== Togo ===
| Year | Manager |
|---|---|
| 2006 | (Germany) Otto Pfister |

=== Trinidad and Tobago ===
| Year | Manager |
|---|---|
| 2006 | (Netherlands) Leo Beenhakker |

=== Ukraine ===
| Year | Manager |
|---|---|
| 2006 | (Ukraine) Oleg Blokhin |

=== United Arab Emirates ===
| Year | Manager |
|---|---|
| 1990 | (Brazil) Carlos Alberto Parreira |

=== Uzbekistan ===
| Year | Manager |
|---|---|
| 2026 | (Italy) Fabio Cannavaro |

== By year ==
Flags indicate the managers' nationalities, while FIFA trigrammes indicate the teams they were in charge of.

| Year | Managers |
|---|---|
| 1930 | (Spain) F. Bru (PER) • (France) R. Caudron (FRA) • (Argentina) J. Durand Laguna (PAR) • (Belgium) H. Goetinck (BEL) • (Spain) (Mexico) J. Luque de Serrallonga (MEX) • (Scotland) (United States) R. Millar (USA) • (Argentina) F. Olazar & (Argentina) J. Tramutola (ARG) • (Hungary) G. Orth (CHI) • (Brazil) Píndaro (BRA) • (Romania) C. Rădulescu (ROU) • (Bolivia) U. Saucedo (BOL) • (Kingdom of Yugoslavia) B. Simonović (YUG) • (Uruguay) A. Suppici (URU) |
| 1934 | (Spain) A. García (ESP) • (England) B. Glendenning (NED) • (Belgium) H. Goetinck (BEL) • (Scotland) (United States) D. Gould (USA) • (England) S. Kimpton (FRA) • (Scotland) J. McCrae (EGY) • (Austria) H. Meisl (AUT) • (Switzerland) H. Müller (SUI) • (Hungary) Ö. Nádas (HUN) • (Hungary) J. Nagy (SWE) • (Germany) O. Nerz (GER) • (Italy) F. Pascucci (ARG) • (Czechoslovakia) K. Petrů (TCH) • (Italy) V. Pozzo (ITA) • (Austria) J. Uridil & (Romania) C. Rădulescu (ROU) • (Brazil) L. Vinhaes (BRA) |
| 1938 | (France) G. Barreau (FRA) • (England) J. Butler (BEL) • (Hungary) K. Dietz & (Hungary) A. Schaffer (HUN) • (England) B. Glendenning (NED) • (Norway) A. Halvorsen (NOR) • (Germany) S. Herberger (GER) • (Poland) J. Kałuża (POL) • (Netherlands) J. Mastenbroek (INH) • (Czechoslovakia) J. Meissner (TCH) • (Hungary) J. Nagy (SWE) • (Brazil) A. Pimenta (BRA) • (Italy) V. Pozzo (ITA) • (Germany) K. Rappan (SUI) • (Romania) A. Săvulescu & (Romania) C. Rădulescu (ROU) • (Cuba) J. Tapia (CUB) |
| 1950 | (Switzerland) F. Andreoli (SUI) • (Socialist Federal Republic of Yugoslavia) M. Arsenijević (YUG) • (Chile) A. Buccicardi (CHI) • (Brazil) F. Costa (BRA) • (Spain) G. Eizaguirre (ESP) • (Paraguay) M. Fleitas Solich (PAR) • (Scotland) (United States) W. Jeffrey (USA) • (Uruguay) J. López (URU) • (Italy) F. Novo (ITA) • (Italy) M. Pretto (BOL) • (England) G. Raynor (SWE) • (Mexico) O. Vial (MEX) • (England) W. Winterbottom (ENG) |
| 1954 | (Scotland) A. Beattie & selection committee (SCO) • (Czechoslovakia) K. Borhy (TCH) • (Hungary) L. Czeizler (ITA) • (West Germany) S. Herberger (FRG) • (South Korea) Kim Yong-sik (KOR) • (Scotland) D. Livingstone (BEL) • (Uruguay) J. López (URU) • (Spain) A. López Herranz (MEX) • (Brazil) Z. Moreira (BRA) • (Austria) W. Nausch (AUT) • (France) P. Pibarot (FRA) • (Italy) S. Puppo (TUR) • (Austria) K. Rappan (SUI) • (Hungary) G. Sebes (HUN) • (Socialist Federal Republic of Yugoslavia) A. Tirnanić (YUG) • (England) W. Winterbottom (ENG) |
| 1958 | (Austria) J. Argauer (AUT) • (Hungary) L. Baróti (HUN) • (France) A. Batteux (FRA) • (Northern Ireland) P. Doherty (NIR) • (Brazil) V. Feola (BRA) • (Paraguay) A. González (PAR) • (West Germany) S. Herberger (FRG) • (Soviet Union) G. Kachalin (URS) • (Czechoslovakia) K. Kolský (TCH) • (Spain) A. López Herranz (MEX) • (Wales) J. Murphy (WAL) • (England) G. Raynor (SWE) • (Argentina) G. Stábile (ARG) • (Socialist Federal Republic of Yugoslavia) A. Tirnanić (YUG) • (Scotland) D. Walker (SCO) • (England) W. Winterbottom (ENG) |
| 1962 | (Hungary) L. Baróti (HUN) • (Uruguay) J. Corazzo (URU) • (West Germany) S. Herberger (FRG) • (Argentina) (France) H. Herrera (ESP) • (Soviet Union) G. Kachalin (URS) • (Argentina) J. Lorenzo (ARG) • (Socialist Federal Republic of Yugoslavia) L. Lovrić, (Socialist Federal Republic of Yugoslavia) P. Mihajlović & (Socialist Federal Republic of Yugoslavia) H. Ruševljanin (YUG) • (Italy) P. Mazza & (Italy) G. Ferrari (ITA) • (Brazil) A. Moreira (BRA) • (Bulgaria) G. Pachedzhiev (BUL) • (Argentina) A. Pedernera (COL) • (Austria) K. Rappan (SUI) • (Chile) F. Riera (CHI) • (Mexico) I. Trelles (MEX) • (Austria) (Czechoslovakia) R. Vytlačil (TCH) • (England) W. Winterbottom (ENG) |
| 1966 | (Chile) L. Álamos (CHI) • (Hungary) L. Baróti (HUN) • (Italy) E. Fabbri (ITA) • (Brazil) V. Feola (BRA) • (Italy) A. Foni (SUI) • (Brazil) O. Glória (POR) • (France) H. Guérin (FRA) • (Argentina) J. Lorenzo (ARG) • (Soviet Union) N. Morozov (URS) • (North Korea) Myung Rye-hyun (PRK) • (England) A. Ramsey (ENG) • (West Germany) H. Schön (FRG) • (Mexico) I. Trelles (MEX) • (Uruguay) O. Viera (URU) • (Spain) J. Villalonga (ESP) • (Austria) (Czechoslovakia) R. Vytlačil (BUL) |
| 1970 | (Sweden) O. Bergmark (SWE) • (Bulgaria) S. Bozhkov (BUL) • (Mexico) R. Cárdenas (MEX) • (Chile) H. Carrasco (SLV) • (Brazil) Didi (PER) • (Belgium) R. Goethals (BEL) • (Argentina) (Uruguay) J. Hohberg (URU) • (Soviet Union) G. Kachalin (URS) • (Czechoslovakia) J. Marko (TCH) • (Romania) A. Niculescu (ROU) • (England) A. Ramsey (ENG) • (Israel) E. Scheffer (ISR) • (West Germany) H. Schön (FRG) • (Italy) F. Valcareggi (ITA) • (Socialist Federal Republic of Yugoslavia) B. Vidinić (MAR) • (Brazil) M. Zagallo (BRA) |
| 1974 | (Chile) L. Álamos (CHI) • (East Germany) G. Buschner (GDR) • (Argentina) V. Cap (ARG) • (Sweden) G. Ericson (SWE) • (Poland) K. Górski (POL) • (Netherlands) R. Michels (NED) • (Socialist Federal Republic of Yugoslavia) M. Miljanić (YUG) • (Bulgaria) H. Mladenov (BUL) • (Scotland) W. Ormond (SCO) • (Uruguay) R. Porta (URU) • (Socialist Federal Republic of Yugoslavia) (Australia) R. Rasic (AUS) • (West Germany) H. Schön (FRG) • (Haiti) A. Tassy (HAI) • (Italy) F. Valcareggi (ITA) • (Socialist Federal Republic of Yugoslavia) B. Vidinić (ZAI) • (Brazil) M. Zagallo (BRA) |
| 1978 | (Hungary) L. Baróti (HUN) • (Italy) E. Bearzot (ITA) • (Peru) M. Calderón (PER) • (Tunisia) A. Chetali (TUN) • (Brazil) C. Coutinho (BRA) • (Sweden) G. Ericson (SWE) • (Poland) J. Gmoch (POL) • (Austria) E. Happel (NED) • (France) M. Hidalgo (FRA) • (Hungary) (Spain) L. Kubala (ESP) • (Scotland) A. MacLeod (SCO) • (Argentina) C. Menotti (ARG) • (Iran) H. Mohajerani (IRN) • (Mexico) J. Roca (MEX) • (West Germany) H. Schön (FRG) • (Austria) H. Senekowitsch (AUT) |
| 1982 | (England) J. Adshead (NZL) • (Italy) E. Bearzot (ITA) • (Soviet Union) K. Beskov (URS) • (Northern Ireland) B. Bingham (NIR) • (Honduras) Chelato Uclés (HON) • (West Germany) J. Derwall (FRG) • (England) R. Greenwood (ENG) • (France) M. Hidalgo (FRA) • (Algeria) M. Khalef & (Algeria) R. Mekhloufi (ALG) • (Austria) F. Latzke & (Austria) G. Schmidt (AUT) • (Argentina) C. Menotti (ARG) • (Hungary) K. Mészöly (HUN) • (Socialist Federal Republic of Yugoslavia) M. Miljanić (YUG) • (Brazil) C. Parreira (KUW) • (Poland) A. Piechniczek (POL) • (El Salvador) P. Rodríguez (SLV) • (Uruguay) (Spain) J. Santamaría (ESP) • (Chile) L. Santibáñez (CHI) • (Scotland) J. Stein (SCO) • (Brazil) Telê Santana (BRA) • (Belgium) G. Thys (BEL) • (Brazil) Tim (PER) • (Czechoslovakia) J. Vengloš (TCH) • (France) J. Vincent (CMR) |
| 1986 | (Italy) E. Bearzot (ITA) • (West Germany) F. Beckenbauer (FRG) • (Argentina) C. Bilardo (ARG) • (Northern Ireland) B. Bingham (NIR) • (Uruguay) O. Borrás (URU) • (Brazil) Evaristo (IRQ) • (Brazil) J. Faria (MAR) • (Scotland) A. Ferguson (SCO) • (South Korea) Kim Jung-nam (KOR) • (Soviet Union) V. Lobanovskyi (URS) • (Hungary) G. Mezey (HUN) • (France) H. Michel (FRA) • (Socialist Federal Republic of Yugoslavia) B. Milutinović (MEX) • (Spain) M. Muñoz (ESP) • (Poland) A. Piechniczek (POL) • (West Germany) S. Piontek (DEN) • (Paraguay) C. Ré (PAR) • (England) B. Robson (ENG) • (Algeria) R. Saâdane (ALG) • (Brazil) Telê Santana (BRA) • (Belgium) G. Thys (BEL) • (Portugal) J. Torres (POR) • (Bulgaria) I. Vutsov (BUL) • (England) T. Waiters (CAN) |
| 1990 | (West Germany) F. Beckenbauer (FRG) • (Netherlands) L. Beenhakker (NED) • (Argentina) C. Bilardo (ARG) • (England) J. Charlton (IRL) • (Egypt) M. El-Gohary (EGY) • (United States) B. Gansler (USA) • (Austria) J. Hickersberger (AUT) • (Romania) E. Jenei (ROU) • (Brazil) S. Lazaroni (BRA) • (South Korea) Lee Hoe-taik (KOR) • (Soviet Union) V. Lobanovskyi (URS) • (Colombia) F. Maturana (COL) • (Socialist Federal Republic of Yugoslavia) B. Milutinović (CRC) • (Soviet Union) V. Nepomnyashchy (CMR) • (Sweden) O. Nordin (SWE) • (Socialist Federal Republic of Yugoslavia) I. Osim (YUG) • (Brazil) C. Parreira (UAE) • (England) B. Robson (ENG) • (Scotland) A. Roxburgh (SCO) • (Spain) L. Suárez (ESP) • (Uruguay) Ó. Tabárez (URU) • (Belgium) G. Thys (BEL) • (Czechoslovakia) J. Vengloš (TCH) • (Italy) A. Vicini (ITA) |
| 1994 | (Netherlands) D. Advocaat (NED) • (Spain) X. Azkargorta (BOL) • (Argentina) A. Basile (ARG) • (Morocco) A. Blinda (MAR) • (England) J. Charlton (IRL) • (Spain) J. Clemente (ESP) • (England) R. Hodgson (SUI) • (Romania) A. Iordănescu (ROU) • (South Korea) Kim Ho (KOR) • (Colombia) F. Maturana (COL) • (Mexico) M. Mejía Barón (MEX) • (France) H. Michel (CMR) • (Federal Republic of Yugoslavia) B. Milutinović (USA) • (Norway) E. Olsen (NOR) • (Greece) A. Panagoulias (GRE) • (Brazil) C. Parreira (BRA) • (Bulgaria) D. Penev (BUL) • (Italy) A. Sacchi (ITA) • (Russia) P. Sadyrin (RUS) • (Argentina) J. Solari (KSA) • (Sweden) T. Svensson (SWE) • (Belgium) P. Van Himst (BEL) • (Germany) B. Vogts (GER) • (Netherlands) C. Westerhof (NGA) |
| 1998 | (Uruguay) (Chile) N. Acosta (CHI) • (Croatia) M. Blažević (CRO) • (Bulgaria) H. Bonev (BUL) • (Scotland) C. Brown (SCO) • (Brazil) P. Carpegiani (PAR) • (South Korea) Cha Bum-kun & (South Korea) Kim Pyung-seok (KOR) • (Spain) J. Clemente (ESP) • (Colombia) H. Gómez (COL) • (Netherlands) G. Hiddink (NED) • (England) G. Hoddle (ENG) • (Romania) A. Iordănescu (ROU) • (France) A. Jacquet (FRA) • (Sweden) B. Johansson (DEN) • (Poland) H. Kasperczak & (Tunisia) A. Selmi (TUN) • (Mexico) M. Lapuente (MEX) • (France) C. Le Roy (CMR) • (Belgium) G. Leekens (BEL) • (Italy) C. Maldini (ITA) • (France) H. Michel (MAR) • (Federal Republic of Yugoslavia) B. Milutinović (NGA) • (Japan) T. Okada (JPN) • (Norway) E. Olsen (NOR) • (Brazil) C. Parreira & (Saudi Arabia) M. Al-Kharashy (KSA) • (Argentina) D. Passarella (ARG) • (Austria) H. Prohaska (AUT) • (United States) S. Sampson (USA) • (Federal Republic of Yugoslavia) S. Santrač (YUG) • (Brazil) R. Simões (JAM) • (Iran) J. Talebi (IRN) • (France) P. Troussier (RSA) • (Germany) B. Vogts (GER) • (Brazil) M. Zagallo (BRA) |
| 2002 | (Mexico) J. Aguirre (MEX) • (Saudi Arabia) N. Al-Johar (KSA) • (United States) B. Arena (USA) • (Argentina) M. Bielsa (ARG) • (Spain) J. Camacho (ESP) • (Poland) J. Engel (POL) • (Sweden) S.-G. Eriksson (ENG) • (Colombia) H. Gómez (ECU) • (Costa Rica) A. Guimarães (CRC) • (Turkey) Ş. Güneş (TUR) • (Netherlands) G. Hiddink (KOR) • (Croatia) M. Jozić (CRO) • (Slovenia) S. Katanec & (Slovenia) D. Popivoda (SVN) • (Sweden) L. Lagerbäck & (Sweden) T. Söderberg (SWE) • (France) R. Lemerre (FRA) • (Italy) C. Maldini (PAR) • (Republic of Ireland) M. McCarthy (IRL) • (France) B. Metsu (SEN) • (Federal Republic of Yugoslavia) B. Milutinović (CHN) • (Portugal) A. Oliveira (POR) • (Denmark) M. Olsen (DEN) • (Nigeria) F. Onigbinde (NGA) • (Uruguay) V. Púa (URU) • (Russia) O. Romantsev (RUS) • (Germany) W. Schäfer (CMR) • (Brazil) L. Scolari (BRA) • (South Africa) J. Sono (RSA) • (Tunisia) A. Souayah (TUN) • (Italy) G. Trapattoni (ITA) • (France) P. Troussier (JPN) • (Germany) R. Völler (GER) • (Belgium) R. Waseige (BEL) |
| 2006 | (Netherlands) D. Advocaat (KOR) • (Spain) L. Aragonés (ESP) • (United States) B. Arena (USA) • (Netherlands) M. van Basten (NED) • (Netherlands) L. Beenhakker (TRI) • (Ukraine) O. Blokhin (UKR) • (Czech Republic) K. Brückner (CZE) • (France) R. Domenech (FRA) • (Serbia) R. Dujković (GHA) • (Sweden) S.-G. Eriksson (ENG) • (Costa Rica) A. Guimarães (CRC) • (Netherlands) G. Hiddink (AUS) • (Croatia) B. Ivanković (IRN) • (Poland) P. Janas (POL) • (Germany) J. Klinsmann (GER) • (Croatia) Z. Kranjčar (CRO) • (Switzerland) K. Kuhn (SUI) • (Argentina) R. La Volpe (MEX) • (Sweden) L. Lagerbäck (SWE) • (France) R. Lemerre (TUN) • (Italy) M. Lippi (ITA) • (France) H. Michel (CIV) • (Angola) Oliveira Gonçalves (ANG) • (Brazil) M. Paquetá (KSA) • (Brazil) C. Parreira (BRA) • (Argentina) J. Pékerman (ARG) • (Serbia) I. Petković (SCG) • (Germany) O. Pfister (TOG) • (Uruguay) A. Ruiz (PAR) • (Brazil) L. Scolari (POR) • (Colombia) L. Suárez (ECU) • (Brazil) Zico (JPN) |
| 2010 | (Mexico) J. Aguirre (MEX) • (Serbia) R. Antić (SRB) • (Argentina) M. Bielsa (CHI) • (Spain) V. del Bosque (ESP) • (United States) B. Bradley (USA) • (Italy) F. Capello (ENG) • (France) R. Domenech (FRA) • (Brazil) Dunga (BRA) • (Sweden) S.-G. Eriksson (CIV) • (New Zealand) R. Herbert (NZL) • (Germany) O. Hitzfeld (SUI) • (South Korea) Huh Jung-moo (KOR) • (Slovenia) M. Kek (SVN) • (North Korea) Kim Jong-hun (PRK) • (Sweden) L. Lagerbäck (NGA) • (France) P. Le Guen (CMR) • (Italy) M. Lippi (ITA) • (Germany) J. Löw (GER) • (Argentina) D. Maradona (ARG) • (Argentina) G. Martino (PAR) • (Netherlands) B. van Marwijk (NED) • (Japan) T. Okada (JPN) • (Denmark) M. Olsen (DEN) • (Brazil) C.Parreira (RSA) • (Portugal) C. Queiroz (POR) • (Serbia) M. Rajevac (GHA) • (Germany) O. Rehhagel (GRE) • (Colombia) R. Rueda & (Colombia) A. Mendoza (HON) • (Algeria) R. Saâdane (ALG) • (Uruguay) Ó. Tabárez (URU) • (Netherlands) P. Verbeek (AUS) • (Slovakia) V. Weiss (SVK) |
| 2014 | (Ghana) J. Appiah (GHA) • (Portugal) P. Bento (POR) • (Spain) V. del Bosque (ESP) • (Italy) F. Capello (RUS) • (France) D. Deschamps (FRA) • (Germany) V. Finke (CMR) • (Netherlands) L. van Gaal (NED) • (Bosnia and Herzegovina) V. Halilhodžić (ALG) • (Mexico) M. Herrera (MEX) • (Germany) O. Hitzfeld (SUI) • (England) R. Hodgson (ENG) • (South Korea) Hong Myung-bo (KOR) • (Nigeria) S. Keshi (NGA) • (Germany) J. Klinsmann (USA) • (Croatia) N. Kovač (CRO) • (France) S. Lamouchi (CIV) • (Germany) J. Löw (GER) • (Argentina) J. Pékerman (COL) • (Colombia) J. Pinto (CRC) • (Australia) A. Postecoglou (AUS) • (Italy) C. Prandelli (ITA) • (Portugal) C. Queiroz (IRN) • (Colombia) R. Rueda (ECU) • (Argentina) A. Sabella (ARG) • (Argentina) J. Sampaoli (CHI) • (Portugal) F. Santos (GRE) • (Brazil) L. Scolari (BRA) • (Colombia) L. Suárez (HON) • (Bosnia and Herzegovina) S. Sušić (BIH) • (Uruguay) Ó. Tabárez (URU) • (Belgium) M. Wilmots (BEL) • (Italy) A. Zaccheroni (JPN) |
| 2018 | (Sweden) J. Andersson (SWE) • (Russia) S. Cherchesov (RUS) • (Senegal) A. Cissé (SEN) • (Argentina) H. Cúper (EGY) • (Croatia) Z. Dalić (CRO) • (France) D. Deschamps (FRA) • (Argentina) R. Gareca (PER) • (Colombia) H. Gómez (PAN) • (Iceland) H. Hallgrímsson (ISL) • (Norway) Å. Hareide (DEN) • (Spain) F. Hierro (ESP) • (Serbia) M. Krstajić (SRB) • (Germany) J. Löw (GER) • (Tunisia) N. Maâloul (TUN) • (Spain) R. Martínez (BEL) • (Netherlands) B. van Marwijk (AUS) • (Poland) A. Nawałka (POL) • (Japan) A. Nishino (JPN) • (Colombia) J. Osorio (MEX) • (Argentina) J. Pékerman (COL) • (Bosnia and Herzegovina) (Switzerland) V. Petković (SUI) • (Argentina) (Spain) J. Pizzi (KSA) • (Portugal) C. Queiroz (IRN) • (Costa Rica) Ó. Ramírez (CRC) • (France) H. Renard (MAR) • (Germany) G. Rohr (NGA) • (Argentina) J. Sampaoli (ARG) • (Portugal) F. Santos (POR) • (South Korea) Shin Tae-yong (KOR) • (England) G. Southgate (ENG) • (Uruguay) Ó. Tabárez (URU) • (Brazil) Tite (BRA) |
| 2022 | (Germany) (Ghana) O. Addo (GHA) • (Argentina) G. Alfaro (ECU) • (Uruguay) D. Alonso (URU) • (Australia) G. Arnold (AUS) • (Portugal) P. Bento & (Portugal) S. Costa (KOR) • (United States) G. Berhalter (USA) • (Senegal) A. Cissé (SEN) • (Croatia) Z. Dalić (CRO) • (France) D. Deschamps (FRA) • (Germany) H. Flick (GER) • (Netherlands) L. van Gaal (NED) • (England) J. Herdman (CAN) • (Denmark) K. Hjulmand (DEN) • (Tunisia) J. Kadri (TUN) • (Spain) Luis Enrique (ESP) • (Spain) R. Martínez (BEL) • (Argentina) G. Martino (MEX) • (Poland) C. Michniewicz (POL) • (Japan) H. Moriyasu (JPN) • (Wales) R. Page (WAL) • (Portugal) C. Queiroz (IRN) • (France) (Morocco) W. Regragui (MAR) • (France) H. Renard (KSA) • (Spain) F. Sánchez (QAT) • (Portugal) F. Santos (POR) • (Argentina) L. Scaloni (ARG) • (Cameroon) R. Song (CMR) • (England) G. Southgate (ENG) • (Serbia) D. Stojković (SRB) • (Colombia) L. Suárez (CRC) • (Brazil) Tite (BRA) • (Switzerland) M. Yakin (SUI) |
| 2026 | (Netherlands) D. Advocaat (CUW) • (Mexico) J. Aguirre (MEX) • (Argentina) G. Alfaro (PAR) • (Italy) C. Ancelotti (BRA) • (Australia) G. Arnold (IRQ) • (Bosnia and Herzegovina) S. Barbarez (BIH) • (England) D. Bazeley (NZL) • (Argentina) S. Beccacece (ECU) • (Argentina) M. Bielsa (URU) • (Belgium) H. Broos (RSA) • (Cape Verde) Bubista (CPV) • (Italy) F. Cannavaro (UZB) • (Denmark) (Spain) T. Christiansen (PAN) • (Scotland) S. Clarke (SCO) • (Croatia) Z. Dalić (CRO) • (France) S. Desabre (COD) • (France) D. Deschamps & (France) G. Stéphan (FRA) • (Greece) G. Donis (KSA) • (France) (Ivory Coast) E. Faé (CIV) • (Spain) L. de la Fuente (ESP) • (France) R. Garcia (BEL) • (Iran) A. Ghalenoei (IRN) • (Egypt) H. Hassan (EGY) • (South Korea) Hong Myung-bo (KOR) • (Netherlands) R. Koeman (NED) • (Czech Republic) M. Koubek (CZE) • (France) S. Lamouchi & (France) H. Renard (TUN) • (Spain) J. Lopetegui (QAT) • (Argentina) N. Lorenzo (COL) • (United States) J. Marsch (CAN) • (Spain) R. Martínez (POR) • (France) S. Migné (HAI) • (Italy) V. Montella (TUR) • (Japan) H. Moriyasu (JPN) • (Germany) J. Nagelsmann (GER) • (Belgium) (Morocco) M. Ouahbi (MAR) • (Bosnia and Herzegovina) (Switzerland) V. Petković (ALG) • (Argentina) M. Pochettino (USA) • (Australia) T. Popovic (AUS) • (England) G. Potter (SWE) • (Portugal) C. Queiroz (GHA) • (Germany) R. Rangnick (AUT) • (Argentina) L. Scaloni (ARG) • (Morocco) J. Sellami (JOR) • (Norway) S. Solbakken (NOR) • (Senegal) P. Thiaw (SEN) • (Germany) T. Tuchel (ENG) • (Switzerland) M. Yakin (SUI) |

== Record appearances ==
The below table lists the records of all managers who have appeared in either:

- a final match, (Note: Including the 1950 de facto final.) or
- 10 or more matches, or
- 3 or more World Cups

Key: T – tournaments appeared in; N – different nations managed; M – matches; W – wins; D – draws; L – losses.

As per statistical convention in football, matches decided in extra time are counted as wins and losses, while matches decided by penalty shoot-outs are counted as draws.

As of 2026 FIFA World Cup

| Manager | Nationality | T | N | M | W/D/L | Editions and teams |
|---|---|---|---|---|---|---|
| Carlos Alberto Parreira | Brazil | 6 | 5 | 23 | 10/4/9 | 1982 KUW, 1990 UAE, 1994 BRA, 1998 KSA, (Note: Sacked after two matches, replaced for the remaining match.) 2006 BRA, 2010 RSA |
| Bora Milutinović | Yugoslavia / FR Yugoslavia | 5 | 5 | 20 | 8/3/9 | 1986 MEX, 1990 CRC, 1994 USA, 1998 NGA, 2002 CHN |
| Carlos Queiroz | Portugal | 5 | 3 | 17 | 4/5/8 | 2010 POR, 2014 IRN, 2018 IRN, 2022 IRN, 2026 GHA |
| Sepp Herberger | Germany / West Germany | 4 | 1 | 18 | 9/4/5 | 1938 GER, 1954 FRG, 1958 FRG, 1962 FRG |
| Walter Winterbottom | England | 4 | 1 | 14 | 3/5/6 | 1950 ENG, 1954 ENG, 1958 ENG, 1962 ENG |
| Lajos Baróti | Hungary | 4 | 1 | 15 | 5/2/8 | 1958 HUN, 1962 HUN, 1966 HUN, 1978 HUN |
| Helmut Schön | West Germany | 4 | 1 | 25 | 16/5/4 | 1966 FRG, 1970 FRG, 1974 FRG, 1978 FRG |
| Henri Michel | France | 4 | 4 | 16 | 6/4/6 | 1986 FRA, 1994 CMR, 1998 MAR, 2006 CIV |
| Óscar Tabárez | Uruguay | 4 | 1 | 20 | 10/3/7 | 1990 URU, 2010 URU, 2014 URU, 2018 URU |
| Didier Deschamps | France | 4 | 1 | 27 | 20/3/4 | 2014 FRA, 2018 FRA, 2022 FRA, 2026 FRA |
| Constantin Rădulescu | Romania | 3 | 1 | 5 | 1/1/3 | 1930 ROU, 1934 ROU, (Note: Co-managed by Rădulescu and Josef Uridil.) 1938 ROU (Note: Co-managed by Rădulescu and Alexandru Săvulescu.) |
| Karl Rappan | Austria / Germany | 3 | 1 | 10 | 3/1/6 | 1938 SUI, 1954 SUI, 1962 SUI |
| Gavriil Kachalin | Soviet Union | 3 | 1 | 13 | 6/3/4 | 1958 URS, 1962 URS, 1970 URS |
| Mário Zagallo | Brazil | 3 | 1 | 20 | 13/3/4 | 1970 BRA, 1974 BRA, 1998 BRA |
| Enzo Bearzot | Italy | 3 | 1 | 18 | 9/6/3 | 1978 ITA, 1982 ITA, 1986 ITA |
| Guy Thys | Belgium | 3 | 1 | 16 | 6/3/7 | 1982 BEL, 1986 BEL, 1990 BEL |
| Dick Advocaat | Netherlands | 3 | 3 | 11 | 4/2/5 | 1994 NED, 2006 KOR, 2026 CUW |
| Guus Hiddink | Netherlands | 3 | 3 | 18 | 7/6/5 | 1998 NED, 2002 KOR, 2006 AUS |
| Hernán Darío Gómez | Colombia | 3 | 3 | 9 | 2/0/7 | 1998 COL, 2002 ECU, 2018 PAN |
| Sven-Göran Eriksson | Sweden | 3 | 2 | 13 | 6/5/2 | 2002 ENG, 2006 ENG, 2010 CIV |
| Lars Lagerbäck | Sweden | 3 | 2 | 11 | 2/5/4 | 2002 SWE, (Note: Co-managed by Lagerbäck and Tommy Söderberg.) 2006 SWE, 2010 NGA |
| Luiz Felipe Scolari | Brazil | 3 | 2 | 21 | 14/3/4 | 2002 BRA, 2006 POR, 2014 BRA |
| Javier Aguirre | Mexico | 3 | 1 | 13 | 7/2/4 | 2002 MEX, 2010 MEX, 2026 MEX |
| Marcelo Bielsa | Argentina | 3 | 3 | 10 | 3/3/4 | 2002 ARG, 2010 CHI, 2026 URU |
| José Pékerman | Argentina | 3 | 2 | 14 | 9/3/2 | 2006 ARG, 2014 COL, 2018 COL |
| Luis Fernando Suárez | Colombia | 3 | 3 | 10 | 3/0/7 | 2006 ECU, 2014 HON, 2022 CRC |
| Joachim Löw | Germany | 3 | 1 | 17 | 12/1/4 | 2010 GER, 2014 GER, 2018 GER |
| Fernando Santos | Portugal | 3 | 2 | 13 | 5/4/4 | 2014 GRE, 2018 POR, 2022 POR |
| Zlatko Dalić | Croatia | 3 | 1 | 18 | 8/6/4 | 2018 CRO, 2022 CRO, 2026 CRO |
| Roberto Martínez | Spain | 3 | 2 | 15 | 9/3/3 | 2018 BEL, 2022 BEL, 2026 POR |
| Hervé Renard | France | 3 | 3 | 8 | 1/1/6 | 2018 MAR, 2022 KSA, 2026 TUN |
| Vittorio Pozzo | Italy | 2 | 1 | 9 | 8/1/0 | 1934 ITA, 1938 ITA |
| Juan López | Uruguay | 2 | 1 | 9 | 6/1/2 | 1950 URU, 1954 URU |
| George Raynor | England | 2 | 1 | 11 | 6/2/3 | 1950 SWE, 1958 SWE |
| Vicente Feola | Brazil | 2 | 1 | 9 | 6/1/2 | 1958 BRA, 1966 BRA |
| Rudolf Vytlačil | Austria / Czechoslovakia | 2 | 2 | 9 | 3/1/5 | 1962 TCH, 1966 BUL |
| Alf Ramsey | England | 2 | 1 | 10 | 7/1/2 | 1966 ENG, 1970 ENG |
| Ferruccio Valcareggi | Italy | 2 | 1 | 9 | 4/3/2 | 1970 ITA, 1974 ITA |
| Michel Hidalgo | France | 2 | 1 | 10 | 4/2/4 | 1978 FRA, 1982 FRA |
| César Luis Menotti | Argentina | 2 | 1 | 12 | 7/1/4 | 1978 ARG, 1982 ARG |
| Antoni Piechniczek | Poland | 2 | 1 | 11 | 4/4/3 | 1982 POL, 1986 POL |
| Telê Santana | Brazil | 2 | 1 | 10 | 8/1/1 | 1982 BRA, 1986 BRA |
| Franz Beckenbauer | West Germany | 2 | 1 | 14 | 8/4/2 | 1986 FRG, 1990 FRG |
| Carlos Bilardo | Argentina | 2 | 1 | 14 | 8/4/2 | 1986 ARG, 1990 ARG |
| Bobby Robson | England | 2 | 1 | 12 | 5/4/3 | 1986 ENG, 1990 ENG |
| Berti Vogts | Germany | 2 | 1 | 10 | 6/2/2 | 1994 GER, 1998 GER |
| Raymond Domenech | France | 2 | 1 | 10 | 4/4/2 | 2006 FRA, 2010 FRA |
| Marcello Lippi | Italy | 2 | 1 | 10 | 5/4/1 | 2006 ITA, 2010 ITA |
| Vicente del Bosque | Spain | 2 | 1 | 10 | 7/0/3 | 2010 ESP, 2014 ESP |
| Jürgen Klinsmann | Germany | 2 | 2 | 11 | 6/2/3 | 2006 GER, 2014 USA |
| Bert van Marwijk | Netherlands | 2 | 2 | 10 | 6/1/3 | 2010 NED, 2018 AUS |
| Louis van Gaal | Netherlands | 2 | 1 | 12 | 8/4/0 | 2014 NED, 2022 NED |
| Gareth Southgate | England | 2 | 1 | 12 | 6/2/4 | 2018 ENG, 2022 ENG |
| Tite | Brazil | 2 | 1 | 10 | 6/2/2 | 2018 BRA, 2022 BRA |
| Lionel Scaloni | Argentina | 2 | 1 | 15 | 11/2/2 | 2022 ARG, 2026 ARG |
| Murat Yakin | Switzerland | 2 | 1 | 10 | 5/2/3 | 2022 SUI, 2026 SUI |
| Francisco Olazar | Argentina | 1 | 1 | 5 | 4/0/1 | 1930 ARG (Note: Co-managed by Olazar and Juan José Tramutola.) |
| Alberto Suppici | Uruguay | 1 | 1 | 4 | 4/0/0 | 1930 URU |
| Juan José Tramutola | Argentina | 1 | 1 | 5 | 4/0/1 | 1930 ARG (Note: Co-managed by Tramutola and Francisco Olazar.) |
| Karel Petrů | Czechoslovakia | 1 | 1 | 4 | 3/0/1 | 1934 TCH |
| Károly Dietz | Hungary | 1 | 1 | 4 | 3/0/1 | 1938 HUN (Note: Co-managed by Dietz and Alfréd Schaffer.) |
| Alfréd Schaffer | Hungary | 1 | 1 | 4 | 3/0/1 | 1938 HUN (Note: Co-managed by Schaffer and Károly Dietz.) |
| Flávio Costa | Brazil | 1 | 1 | 6 | 4/1/1 | 1950 BRA |
| Gusztáv Sebes | Hungary | 1 | 1 | 5 | 4/0/1 | 1954 HUN |
| Aymoré Moreira | Brazil | 1 | 1 | 6 | 5/1/0 | 1962 BRA |
| Rinus Michels | Netherlands | 1 | 1 | 7 | 5/1/1 | 1974 NED |
| Ernst Happel | Austria | 1 | 1 | 7 | 3/2/2 | 1978 NED |
| Jupp Derwall | West Germany | 1 | 1 | 7 | 3/2/2 | 1982 FRG |
| Arrigo Sacchi | Italy | 1 | 1 | 7 | 4/2/1 | 1994 ITA |
| Aimé Jacquet | France | 1 | 1 | 7 | 6/1/0 | 1998 FRA |
| Rudi Völler | Germany | 1 | 1 | 7 | 5/1/1 | 2002 GER |
| Alejandro Sabella | Argentina | 1 | 1 | 7 | 5/1/1 | 2014 ARG |
| Luis de la Fuente | Spain | 1 | 1 | 8 | 7/1/0 | 2026 ESP |
