= Francisco Sanchez =

Francisco Sanchez may refer to:

== Sportspeople ==
- Francisco Sánchez (swimmer) (born 1976), Venezuelan who swam at the 1996 and 2000 Summer Olympics
- Francisco Sánchez (runner) (born 1958), Spanish steeplechase runner
- Francisco Sánchez (boxer) (born 1956), Dominican Republic boxer
- Francisco Sánchez (wrestler, born 1970) (born 1970), Spanish wrestler who competed at the 1992 Olympics
- Francisco Sánchez (wrestler, born 1979) (born 1979), Spanish wrestler who competed at the 2008 Olympics
- Francisco Sánchez (footballer, born 1985), Chilean football midfielder
- Francisco Sánchez (volleyball) (born 1960), Spanish former volleyball player
- Francisco Sanchez d'Avolio (born 1986), Belgium footballer (soccer player)
- Francisco Sánchez (footballer, died 1951), Chilean footballer
- Francisco Javier Sánchez (born 1973), Mexican football player
- Francisco Sánchez Lara (born 1989), Spanish wheelchair basketball player
- Francisco Sánchez Martínez (1967–2022), Colombian long-distance runner
- Francisco Sánchez Ruiz (born 1991), Spanish pool player

== Others ==
- Francisco Sánchez (American politician) (1805–1862), alcalde (mayor) in 1843 San Francisco, California
- Francisco Sánchez (Argentine politician), member of the Chamber of Deputies of Argentina
- Francisco Sánchez Gomes (1947–2014), see Paco de Lucía, Spanish guitarist/composer
- Francisco Sánchez Chamuscado (1512–1582), Spanish conquistador of New Mexico
- Francisco Sanches (c. 1550–1623), Spanish-Portuguese philosopher and physician
- Francisco Sanchez (sailor) (born 1965), known as Kiko Sánchez
- Frank Sánchez (lawyer) (Francisco Sanchez, born 1959), United States Under Secretary for International Trade
- Joaquin Francisco Sanchez (born 1962), known as Keno, Filipino singer, actor writer
- Francisco Sanchez, suspect in the killing of Kathryn Steinle
- Francisco Sánchez Barbero (1764–1819), Spanish erudite, journalist, poet and writer
- Francisco Sánchez Ramos (born 1970), Mexican politician
- Francisco Sanchez, employee of the United States Small Business Administration, testified before Congress in 2023
