= Argote =

Argote is a Spanish surname. Notable people with this name include:

- Agustín Argote (1926–1996), Spanish boxer
- Carmen Argote (born 1981), Mexican-American performance artist and sculptor
- Estanislao Argote (born 1956), Spanish footballer
- Francisco de Santillán y Argote, 17th-century governor of Margarita (now Venezuela)
- Gonzalo Argote de Molina (1548–1596), Spanish historian
- José Argote (born 1980), Venezuelan football referee
- Juan Argote (born 1906), Bolivian footballer
- Linda Argote, American industrial and organizational psychologist
- Luis de Góngora y Argote, 16th-17th century Spanish poet
