= Gumersindo =

Gumersindo is a given name. Notable people with the name include:

- Gumersindo de Azcárate (1840–1917), Spanish philosopher, jurist and politician
- Gumersindo Ramírez Faustino, Equatoguinean imprisoned political activist
- Antonio Gumersindo Garay García or Sindo Garay (1867–1968), Cuban trova musician
- Gumersindo Gómez (1907–1980), Bolivian football striker
- Gumersindo Gómez (athlete) (1929–2010), Argentine long-distance runner
- Gumersindo Magaña (1939–2013), Mexican politician
