= Francisco Sánchez Barbero =

Spanish erudite, journalist, poet and writer

Francisco Sánchez Barbero (1764–October 23, 1819) was a Spanish journalist, poet and writer. His Latin and Castilian poems achieved success. During the Peninsular War, he was imprisoned for criticizing the French, though he later escaped. In December 1815, he was arrested and imprisoned in Melilla, where he died on October 23, 1819.
