= József Nagy (footballer, born 1892) =

Hungarian footballer and manager

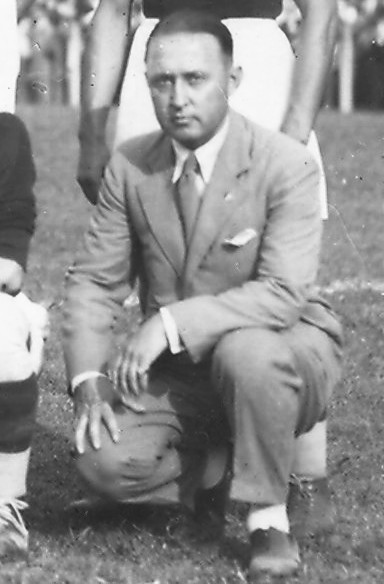
- József Nagy by the 1930s

Personal information
- Date of birth: 15 October 1892
- Place of birth: Budapest, Austria-Hungary
- Date of death: 17 January 1963 (aged 70)
- Position: Midfielder

Senior career*
Years	Team	Apps	(Gls)
- MTK Budapest

Managerial career
- Bocskay
- 1922–1924: Sleipner
- 1924–1925: IFK Malmö
- 1924–1927: Sweden
- 1925–1927: IFK Uddevalla
- 1928–1932: Pro Vercelli
- 1932–1933: Bologna
- 1933–1934: Genoa
- 1934: Sweden
- 1935–1942: Brage
- 1938: Sweden
- 1942–1943: Reymersholm
- 1943–1948: IFK Göteborg
- 1948–1952: Åtvidaberg
- 1952–1954: Oddevold
- 1957–1959: Karlstad
- * Club domestic league appearances and goals

József Nagy (15 October 1892 – 17 January 1963) was a Hungarian footballer and manager from Budapest. He is most noted for his career as a footballing manager. Nagy managed the Sweden national team and Swedish clubs and then he moved on to Serie A, where he managed three clubs, Pro Vercelli, Bologna and Genoa. He also managed Brage.

== Honours ==
Bologna

- Mitropa Cup (1): 1932
