= Velloso (footballer, born 1908) =

Brazilian footballer

Personal information
- Full name: Oswaldo de Barros Velloso
- Date of birth: 25 September 1908
- Place of birth: Corumbá, Brazil
- Date of death: 8 August 1996 (aged 87)
- Height: 1.87 m (6 ft 2 in)
- Position: Goalkeeper

Senior career*
Years	Team	Apps	(Gls)
1926–1928	Bahiano de Tênis	?	(?)
1928–1935	Fluminense	?	(?)

International career
1930	Brazil	3	(0)
- * Club domestic league appearances and goals

Oswaldo de Barros Velloso (25 August 1908 – 8 August 1996) was a Brazilian football player. He has played for Brazil national team at the 1930 FIFA World Cup finals.

== Honours ==
=== Club ===
- Campeonato Baiano (1):

Bahiano de Tênis: 1927

=== National ===
- Copa Río Branco (1):

Brazil: 1931
