= Joel (footballer, born 1904) =

Brazilian footballer

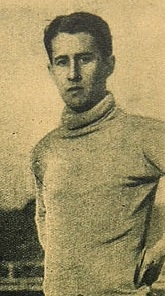

Personal information
- Full name: Joel de Oliveira Monteiro
- Date of birth: 1 May 1904
- Place of birth: Rio de Janeiro, Brazil
- Date of death: 6 April 1990 (aged 85)
- Height: 1.75 m (5 ft 9 in)
- Position: Goalkeeper

Senior career*
| Years | Team | Apps | (Gls) |
| 1927–1932 | America FC (RJ) | ? | (?) |

International career
| 1930 | Brazil | 4 | (0) |
- * Club domestic league appearances and goals

Joel de Oliveira Monteiro (1 May 1904 – 6 April 1990), known as just Joel, was a former Brazilian football player. He played for Brazil national team at the 1930 FIFA World Cup.

== Honours ==
=== Club ===
- Campeonato Carioca:

America FC (RJ): 1928
