= Eduardo Reyes Ortiz =

Bolivian footballer (1907-1955)

Personal information
- Full name: Eduardo Reyes Ortiz Velasco
- Date of birth: January 1, 1907
- Place of birth: Cochabamba, Bolivia
- Date of death: 22 October 1955
- Place of death: Bolivia
- Height: 1.60 m (5 ft 3 in)
- Position: Forward

Senior career*
| Years | Team | Apps | (Gls) |
| 1930 | The Strongest | | |

International career
| 1930 | Bolivia | 1 | (0) |
- * Club domestic league appearances and goals

Eduardo Reyes Ortiz Velasco (1 January 1907 – 22 October 1955) was a Bolivian football forward.

== Career ==
Born in Cochabamba, Reyes spent much of his career playing football at the club The Strongest. While he was studying in England, Reyes played for Trinity Rangers F.C. and Tradesmen F.C.

In 1932, Reyes was one of nearly 600 players and staff from The Strongest to participate in the Chaco War.

During his career he made one appearance for the Bolivia national team at the 1930 FIFA World Cup.

== Achievements ==
- First Division - Pre-National Federation Era: 1

1930
