= Hermógenes Fonseca =

Brazilian footballer (born 1908)

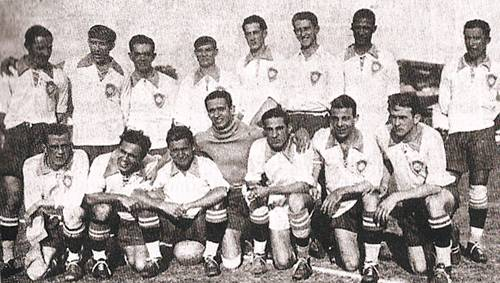

Personal information
- Full name: Hermógenes Valente Fonseca
- Date of birth: 4 November 1908
- Place of birth: Rio de Janeiro, Brazil
- Position: Midfielder

Senior career*
| Years | Team | Apps | (Gls) |
| 1922–1926 | Andarahy | ? | (?) |
| 1927–1934 | América | ? | (?) |
| 1935 | Andarahy | ? | (?) |

International career
| 1930–1931 | Brazil | 5 | (0) |
- * Club domestic league appearances and goals

Hermógenes Valente Fonseca (born 4 November 1908, date of death unknown) was a Brazilian football player. He played for the Brazil national team at the 1930 FIFA World Cup finals. Fonseca is deceased.

== Honours ==
=== Club ===
- Campeonato Carioca (2):

América: 1928, 1931
