= Carmen Argote =

Visual and performance artist (b. 1981)

Carmen Argote (born 1981) is a Los Angeles-based artist. She hails from Guadalajara. She is known for performance art and sculpture. Her work has been included in exhibitions and museum collections, including the Hammer Museum, the Los Angeles County Museum of Art, Denver Art Museum, Orange County Museum of Art and the National Museum of Mexican Art. She was a recipient of the Artadia Award in 2019, the Rema Hort Mann Foundation YoYoYo Grant in 2015, and a California Community Foundation Emerging Artist Grant in 2013. In 2016, the LA Weekly named Argote their "Best Up and Coming Artist".

== Early life ==
Argote's family moved to Los Angeles, CA from Guadalajara, Mexico when she was five years old. She attended community college near her home where she took her first art class and soon realized that art was what she wanted to pursue. The reason for her exploration of the "notion of home" came about after her father decided to return to Mexico when she was seventeen in order to build a home for his family. This experience led to Argote's ongoing artwork, “If only it were that easy…(2018)”.

Argote attended the University of California, Los Angeles where she received her BA in 2004 and her MFA in 2007. She was an "Artists in Residence" at the Skowhegan School of Painting and Sculpture in Maine during 2009.

== Career ==
Growing up in two countries created a mixed identity for Argote. Her art allowed her to incorporate her notions of home from Mexico into those of the United States by using reminders of her home in Guadalajara such as paintings, textiles and photographs. Her artwork combines the home and the immigrant experience through the use of personal objects.

== Work ==
Argote's artwork often revolves around Los Angeles. Her art focuses on combining architecture with the personal and using her surroundings her to tell her story. She explains her immigrant experience and how those surroundings create a sense of belonging and a notion of home. She demonstrates her personal stories, and works with others to create a larger vision.

Argote was commissioned to create public art for the Metro Expo Line Station at 17th and Colorado Avenue in Santa Monica. She uses materials that range from fiberglass to coffee pots or manta rays to produce photographs, sculptures and exhibits. Argote forms connections among our surroundings to expand beyond the individual to explore how we inhabit these spaces. These distinct landscapes create stories and narratives either from the past or present that can be felt through the body. Her work is featured in the collection of Pérez Art Museum Miami, Florida.

=== Major works ===
==== If only it were that easy…, 18th Street Arts Center Artist Lab, Santa Monica, CA ====
When Carmen Argote's father returned to Mexico he traveled on a California Moto Guzzi V11 EV motorcycle. This memory never left Argote's mind. When she visited her father she saw his motorcycle and realized the connection it had with her. She explains how riding the motorcycle back to where her father left would help her heal the pain from abandonment. She called out to artists who ride or have ridden motorcycles in order to learn how to ride the bike and understand the relationship it has with the rider. They gathered in Griffith Park and set up a system to speak with each other while riding that allowed those nearby to hear the conversation and learn what the riders were thinking about without necessarily riding the bikes themselves. This project helps explain the relationship that riders have with their bikes and how they inhabit each space that they reach. Her project culminates when she is able to bring her father's bike from Mexico to Los Angeles. This will allow her to understand her father's experience and journey and to interpret it through her body.

==== Filtration System for a Process Based Practice ====
The materials featured in this exhibition include linen, fiberglass, cotton rope, and unique articles. Her inspiration came from Lincoln Park, near the neighborhood she grew up in. She used to could go there to reflect and consider the inequalities that exist nearby. The work is 5 feet tall. Argote designed it after a mound in Lincoln Park Lake. Argote used the tall piece as an island in her studio, and located a cover underneath where paint drips would fall. She painted the mound with a variety of colors that reminded her of her visits to the park. The cover in the end was used to cover the piece to symbolize the mound at the lake that covered what was underneath.

=== Exhibitions ===
Argote has solo and group exhibitions beginning in 2004. Notably:

Solo exhibitions

- 2019
1. As Above, So Below, New Museum, New York, NY
2. Nutrition For A Better Life (Compre Chatarra), Istanbul, Turkey
3. Manéjese Con Cuidado, PAOS, Guadalajara, Mexico
- 2017
1. Deterioro y Poder, Instituto de Vision, Bogota, Colombia
2. Pyramids, Panel LA, Los Angeles, CA
- 2016
1. Alex's Room, Commonwealth and Council, Los Angeles, CA
2. Mansion Magnolia, Shulamit Nazarian, Venice, CA
- 2014
1. My father's side of Home, Human Resources, Los Angeles, CA
- 2010
1. 720 Sq.ft. Household Mutations, G727, Los Angeles, CA

Group exhibitions

- 2026
1. Several Eternities In A Day: Form in the Age of Living Materials, Hammer Museum, Los Angeles, CA
- 2018
1. Made in L.A. 2018, Hammer Museum, Los Angeles, CA
2. Pacific Standard Time Performance Festival, REDCAT, Los Angeles,
3. The House Imaginary, San Jose Museum of Art, San Jose, CA
- 2017
1. Monarchs, Museum of Contemporary Art, North Miami, FL
2. Mi Tierra: Contemporary Artists Explore Place, Denver Art Museum, Denver, CO
- 2014
1. 5th Chicana/o Biennial, MACLA, San Jose, CA

== Recognition ==
- Emerging Artist Grant by the California Community Foundation (2013)
- YoYoYo Grant by the Rema Hort Mann Foundation (2015)
- Best Up and Coming Artist, LA Weekly (2016)
- Artadia Award (2019)
