= René Fernández =

Bolivian footballer (1906-1956)

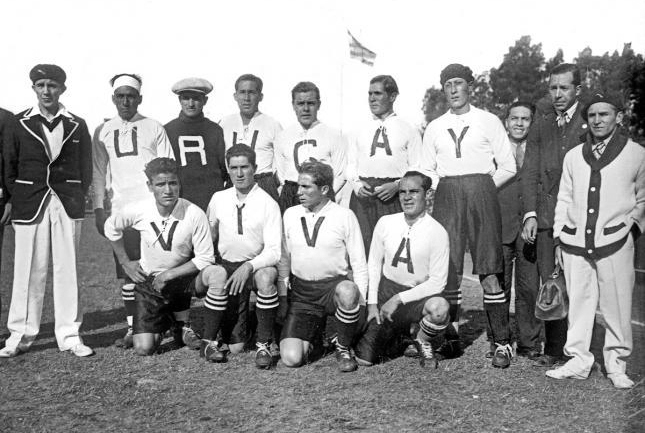

Personal information
- Date of birth: 1 January 1906
- Place of birth: Bolivia
- Date of death: 1956
- Height: 1.67 m (5 ft 5 1/2 in)
- Position: Forward

International career
Years	Team	Apps	(Gls)
1930	Bolivia	2	(0)

René Fernández (1 January 1906 – 1956) was a Bolivian football forward.

== Career ==
During his career he made two appearances for the Bolivia national team at the 1930 FIFA World Cup.
