= Francisco Sánchez (volleyball) =

Spanish volleyball player (born 1960)

Personal information
- Full name: Francisco Sánchez Jover
- Nationality: Spanish
- Born: April 24, 1960 (age 66); Murcia, Spain

Francisco Sánchez (born 24 April 1960) is a Spanish former volleyball player who competed in the 1992 Summer Olympics.
