= Zé Luiz (footballer, born 1904) =

Brazilian footballer

Personal information
- Full name: José Luiz de Oliveira
- Date of birth: 16 November 1904
- Place of birth: Rio de Janeiro, Brazil
- Position: Defender

Senior career*
Years	Team	Apps	(Gls)
1922–1924	Palmeiras-RJ	?	(?)
1925–1935	São Cristóvão	?	(?)
1938	Bangu	12	(0)

International career
1930	Brazil	3	(0)
- * Club domestic league appearances and goals

José Luiz "Zé Luiz" de Oliveira (born 16 November 1904, date of death unknown) was a Brazilian football player. He played for the Brazil national football team at the 1930 FIFA World Cup finals.

He played club football for Palmeiras and São Cristóvão, winning the 1926 Campeonato Carioca with São Cristóvão. De Oliveira is deceased.

== Honours ==
=== Club ===
- Campeonato Carioca (1):

São Cristóvão: 1926
