= Leoncio Veloso =

Chilean footballer (1897-1971)

Personal information
- Full name: Leoncio Veloso Cisternas
- Date of birth: 16 August 1897
- Date of death: 5 October 1971 (aged 74)
- Position: Defender

International career
Years	Team	Apps	(Gls)
1926	Chile	3	(0)

Leoncio Veloso Cisternas (16 August 1897 – 5 October 1971) was a Chilean footballer. He played in three matches for the Chile national football team in 1926. He was also part of Chile's squad for the 1926 South American Championship.
