= Carlos Hill =

Chilean footballer (1906–1969)

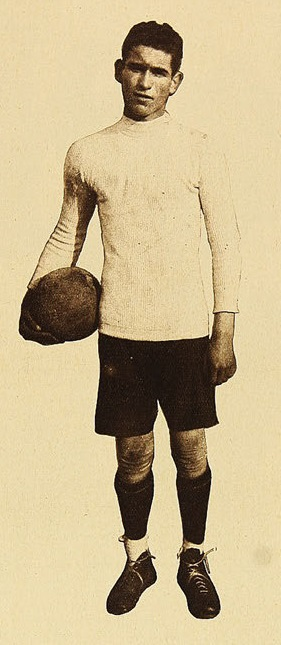

Personal information
- Full name: Carlos Manuel Hill Ovalle
- Date of birth: 6 November 1906
- Date of death: 6 September 1969 (aged 62)

International career
Years	Team	Apps	(Gls)
1926	Chile	1	(0)

Carlos Manuel Hill Ovalle (6 November 1906 – 6 September 1969) was a Chilean footballer. He played in one match for the Chile national football team in 1926. He was also part of Chile's squad for the 1926 South American Championship.
