= Segundo Durandal =

Bolivian footballer (1912-1976)

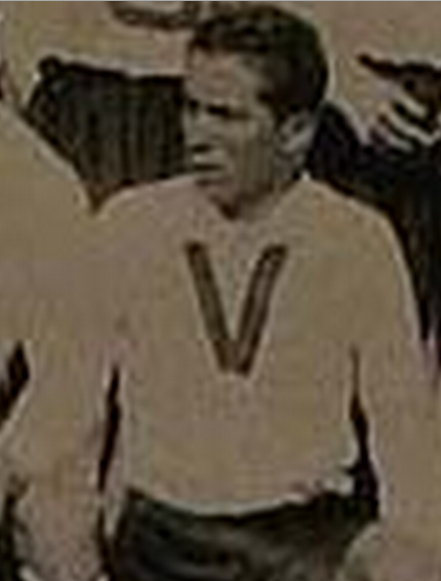

Personal information
- Date of birth: 17 March 1912
- Place of birth: Bolivia
- Date of death: 12 January 1976 (aged 63)
- Height: 1.63 m (5 ft 4 in)
- Position: Defender

Senior career*
Years	Team	Apps	(Gls)
1930–1938	San José Oruro		

International career
1930	Bolivia	2	(0)
- * Club domestic league appearances and goals

Segundo Durandal (17 March 1912 — 12 January 1976) was a Bolivian football defender.

== Club career ==
His career in club football was spent in Club San Josè between 1930 and 1938.

== International career ==
During his career he has made two appearances for the Bolivia national football team at the 1930 FIFA World Cup.
