= Manuel Figueroa =

Chilean footballer (1904-1986)

Personal information
- Full name: Manuel Segundo Figueroa Vergara
- Date of birth: 8 May 1904
- Date of death: 23 April 1986 (aged 81)
- Position: Defender

International career
Years	Team	Apps	(Gls)
1926	Chile	1	(0)

Manuel Segundo Figueroa Vergara (8 May 1904 – 23 April 1986) was a Chilean footballer. He played in one match for the Chile national football team in 1926. He was also part of Chile's squad for the 1926 South American Championship.
