= Ödön Nádas =

Hungarian footballer and coach (1891–1951)

Personal information
- Date of birth: 12 September 1891
- Place of birth: Budapest, Hungary
- Date of death: 9 October 1951 (aged 60)

Senior career*
Years	Team	Apps	(Gls)
- Budapesti EAC
- 33 FC

Managerial career
- 1932–1934: Hungary
- * Club domestic league appearances and goals

Ödön Nádas (12 September 1891 – 9 October 1951) was a Hungarian football trainer, who coached Hungary in the 1934 FIFA World Cup. He was also the national football team's manager from 1932 to 1934.
