= Silvestre Conti =

Argentine footballer

Personal information
- Date of birth: 9 December 1901
- Position: Midfielder

International career
Years	Team	Apps	(Gls)
1926	Argentina	1	(0)

Silvestre Conti (born 9 December 1901, date of death unknown) was an Argentine footballer. He played in one match for the Argentina national football team in 1926. He was also part of Argentina's squad for the 1926 South American Championship.
