= Carlos García (Chilean footballer) =

Chilean footballer (1902-1988)

Personal information
- Full name: Carlos Horacio Raimundo García Tello
- Date of birth: 23 January 1902
- Date of death: 4 September 1988 (aged 86)
- Position: Forward

International career
Years	Team	Apps	(Gls)
1926–1927	Chile	3	(0)

Carlos Horacio Raimundo García Tello (23 January 1902 – 4 September 1988) was a Chilean footballer. He played in three matches for the Chile national football team in 1926 and 1927. He was also part of Chile's squad for the 1926 South American Championship.
