= Gumercindo Gómez =

Bolivian footballer (1907-1980)

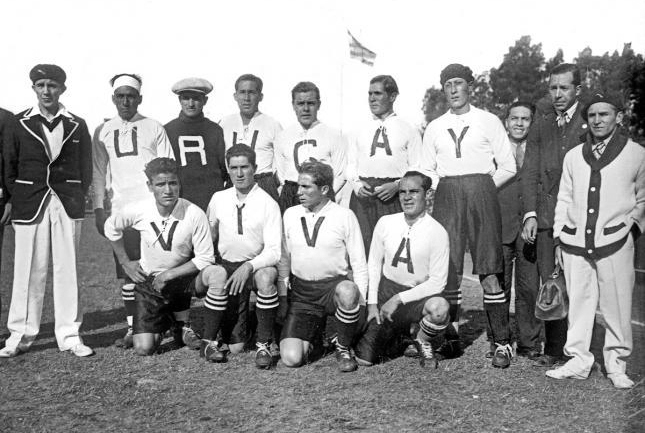

Personal information
- Date of birth: 21 January 1907
- Place of birth: Bolivia
- Date of death: 31 January 1980 (aged 73)
- Position: Forward

International career
Years	Team	Apps	(Gls)
1930	Bolivia	1	(0)

Gumercindo Gomez (21 January 1907– 31 January 1980) was a Bolivian football striker.

== Career ==
During his career he has made one appearance for the Bolivia national team at the 1930 FIFA World Cup. His career in club football was spent in Oruro Royal between 1929 and 1931.
