= Píndaro =

Brazilian footballer and manager

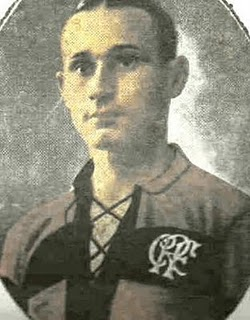

Personal information
- Full name: Píndaro de Carvalho Rodrigues
- Date of birth: June 1, 1892
- Place of birth: São Paulo, Brazil
- Date of death: August 30, 1965 (aged 73)
- Place of death: Rio de Janeiro, Brazil

Senior career*
Years	Team	Apps	(Gls)
1910–1911	Fluminense		
1912–1922	Flamengo		

International career
1914–1919	Brazil		

Managerial career
- 1930: Brazil
Medal record
Men's football
Representing Brazil
Copa América
Winner	1919 Brazil
- * Club domestic league appearances and goals

Píndaro de Carvalho Rodrigues (1 June 1892 – 30 August 1965) was a Brazilian football midfielder and manager. He was also part of Brazil's squad for the 1919 South American Championship.
