= Casiano Chavarría =

Bolivian footballer

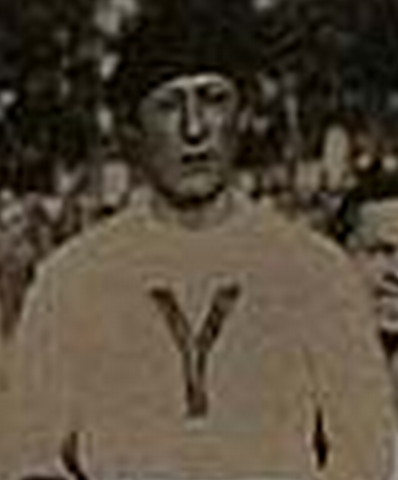

Personal information
- Full name: Casiano José Chavarría
- Date of birth: August 3, 1901
- Place of birth: La Paz, Bolivia
- Height: 1.70 m (5 ft 7 in)
- Position: Defender

Senior career*
Years	Team	Apps	(Gls)
1925–1930	Calavera La Paz		
1931–1932	The Strongest		

International career
1926–1930	Bolivia	8	(0)
- * Club domestic league appearances and goals

Casiano José Chavarria (born 3 August 1901 — date of death unknown) was a Bolivian footballer who played as a defender. Chavarría is deceased.

== Club career ==
His career in club football was spent in Calavera La Paz between 1925 and 1931.

== International career ==
During his career he participated in the 1926 and 1927 South American Championship, and made two appearances for the Bolivia national team at the 1930 FIFA World Cup.
