= José Bustamante (footballer, born 1907) =

Bolivian footballer

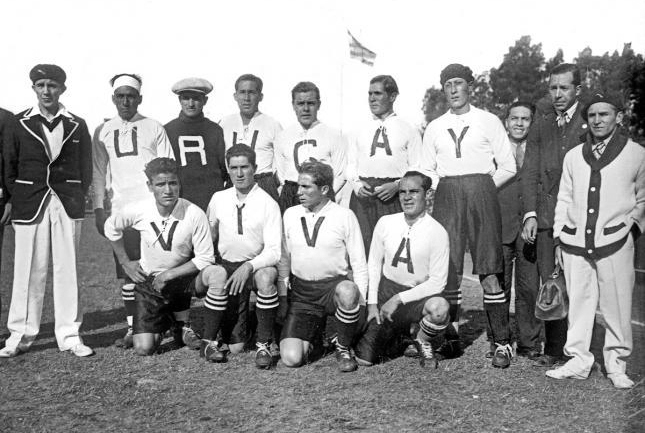

Personal information
- Date of birth: 1907
- Place of birth: La Paz, Bolivia
- Height: 1.64 m (5 ft 4 1/2 in)
- Position: Forward

Senior career*
| Years | Team | Apps | (Gls) |
- Club Litoral

International career
| 1926–1930 | Bolivia | 9 | (2) |
- * Club domestic league appearances and goals

José Bustamante Miramontes (born 1907, date of death unknown) was a Bolivian footballer who played as a forward for Bolívar Nimbles and Club Litoral of La Paz. Bustamante is deceased.

== Career ==
During his career who made two appearances for the Bolivia national team at the 1930 FIFA World Cup.
