= Francisco Sánchez (footballer, died 1951) =

Chilean footballer

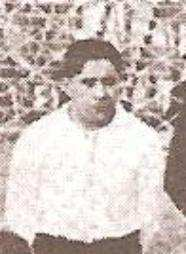

Personal information
- Full name: Francisco Sánchez Rojas
- Place of birth: Chile
- Date of death: 1951
- Place of death: Chile
- Positions: Midfielder; winger

Senior career*
Years	Team	Apps	(Gls)
1933	Colo Colo		
- * Club domestic league appearances and goals

Francisco Sánchez Rojas was a Chilean footballer. Sánchez is also one of the founding members of Colo-Colo, and has been credited as co-inventor of the bicycle kick, also known as "La Chilena".
