= Rafael Méndez (footballer) =

Bolivian footballer (1904–1982)

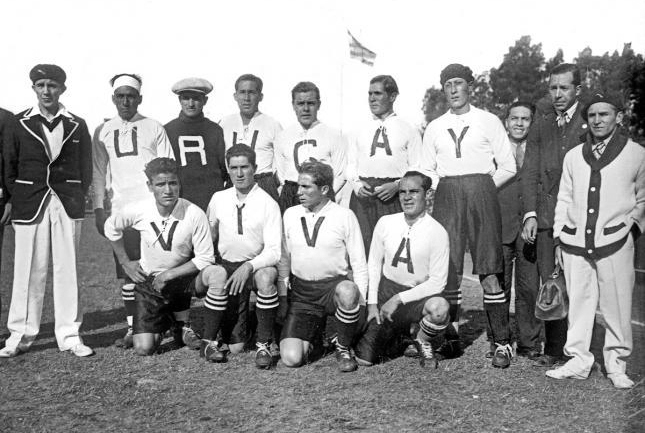

Personal information
- Full name: Rafael Méndez Claure
- Date of birth: 1904
- Place of birth: La Paz, Bolivia
- Date of death: 1982 (aged 77–78)
- Position: Forward

International career
Years	Team	Apps	(Gls)
1926–1930	Bolivia	9	(0)

Rafael Méndez Claure (1904 – 1982) was a Bolivian footballer who played as a forward.

== International career ==
During his international career, he made two appearances for the Bolivia national team at the 1930 FIFA World Cup.
