= Diógenes Lara =

Bolivian footballer (1903-1968)

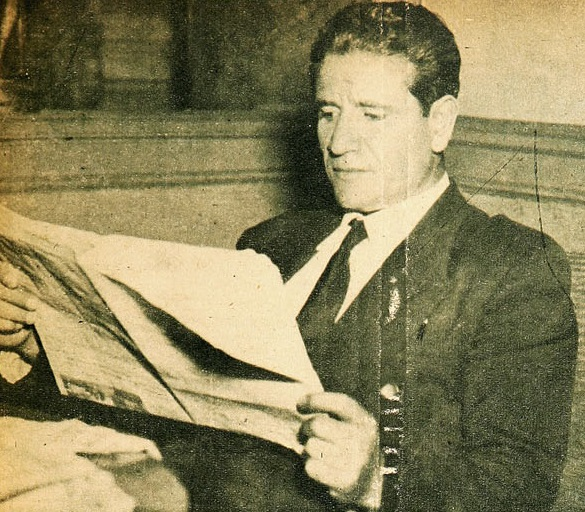

Personal information
- Date of birth: April 6, 1903
- Place of birth: La Paz, Bolivia
- Date of death: September 16, 1968 (aged 65)
- Position: Midfielder

Senior career*
Years	Team	Apps	(Gls)
- Bolívar

International career
1926–1930	Bolivia	9	(0)

Managerial career
- 1945–1946: Bolivia
- * Club domestic league appearances and goals

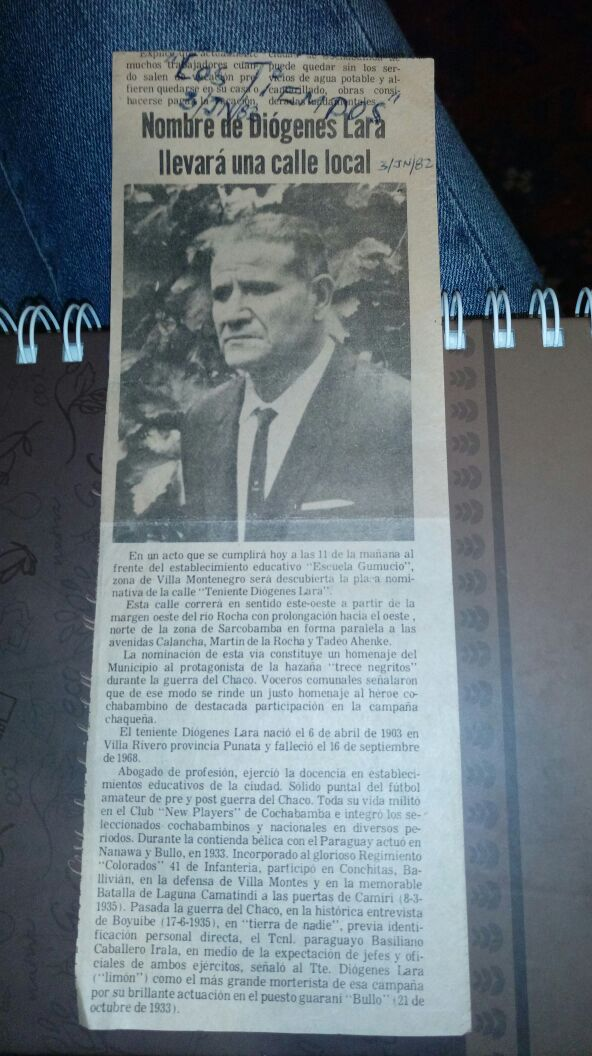
1982 article on the life of Diógenes Lara

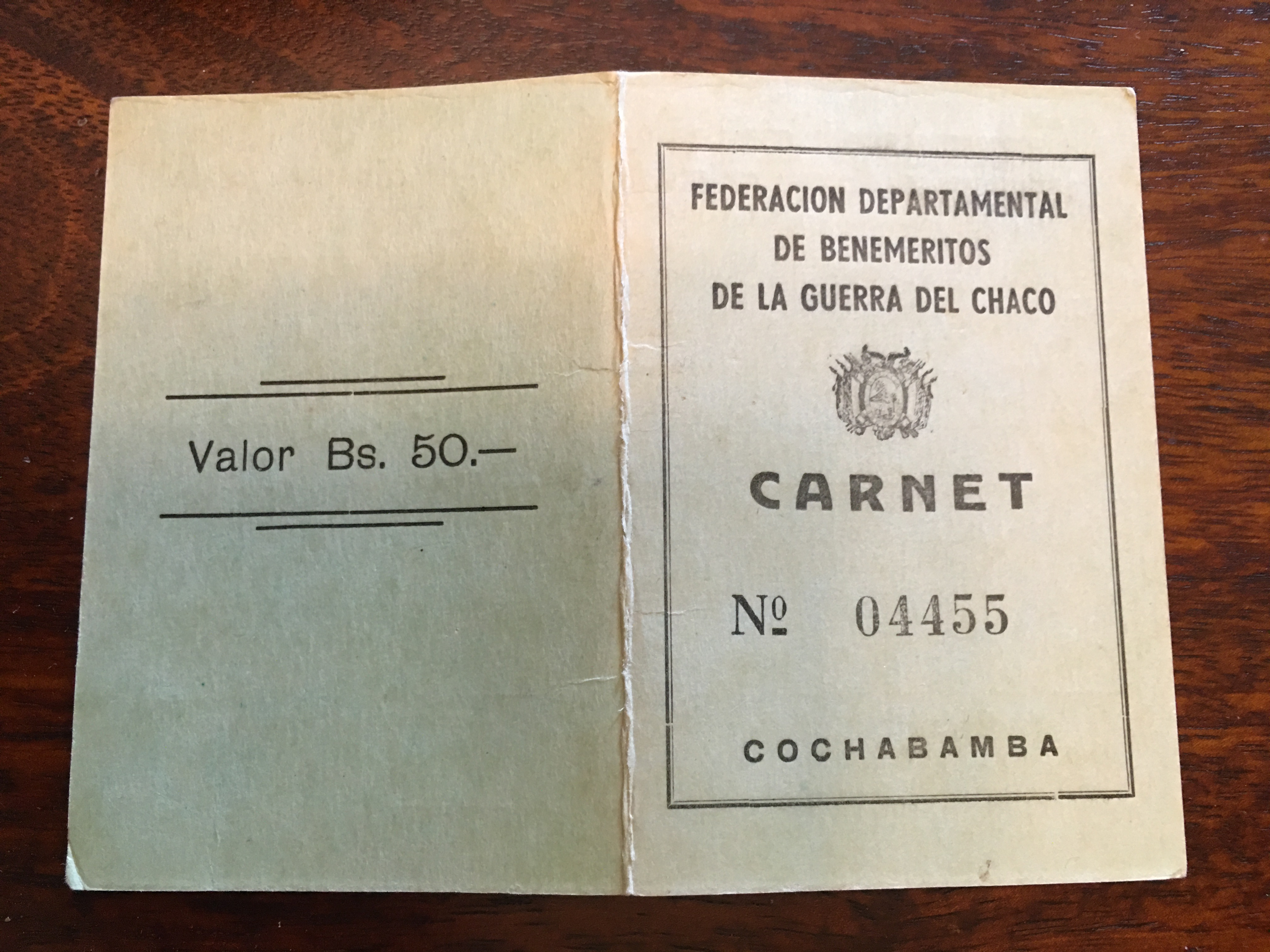
Record from Departmental Federation of Benemeritos of the Chaco War about Diógenes Lara

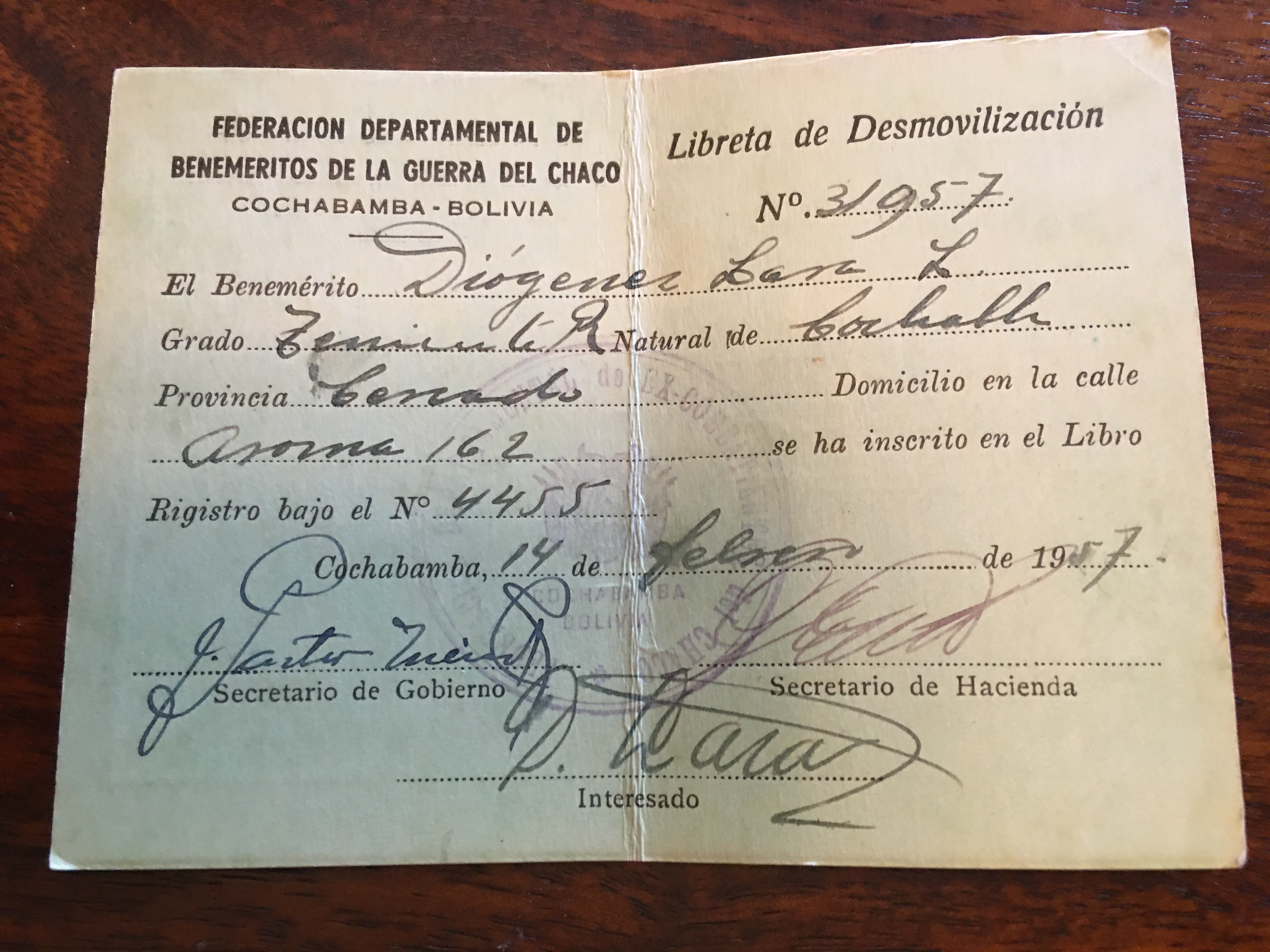
Record from Departmental Federation of Benemeritos of the Chaco War about Diógenes Lara

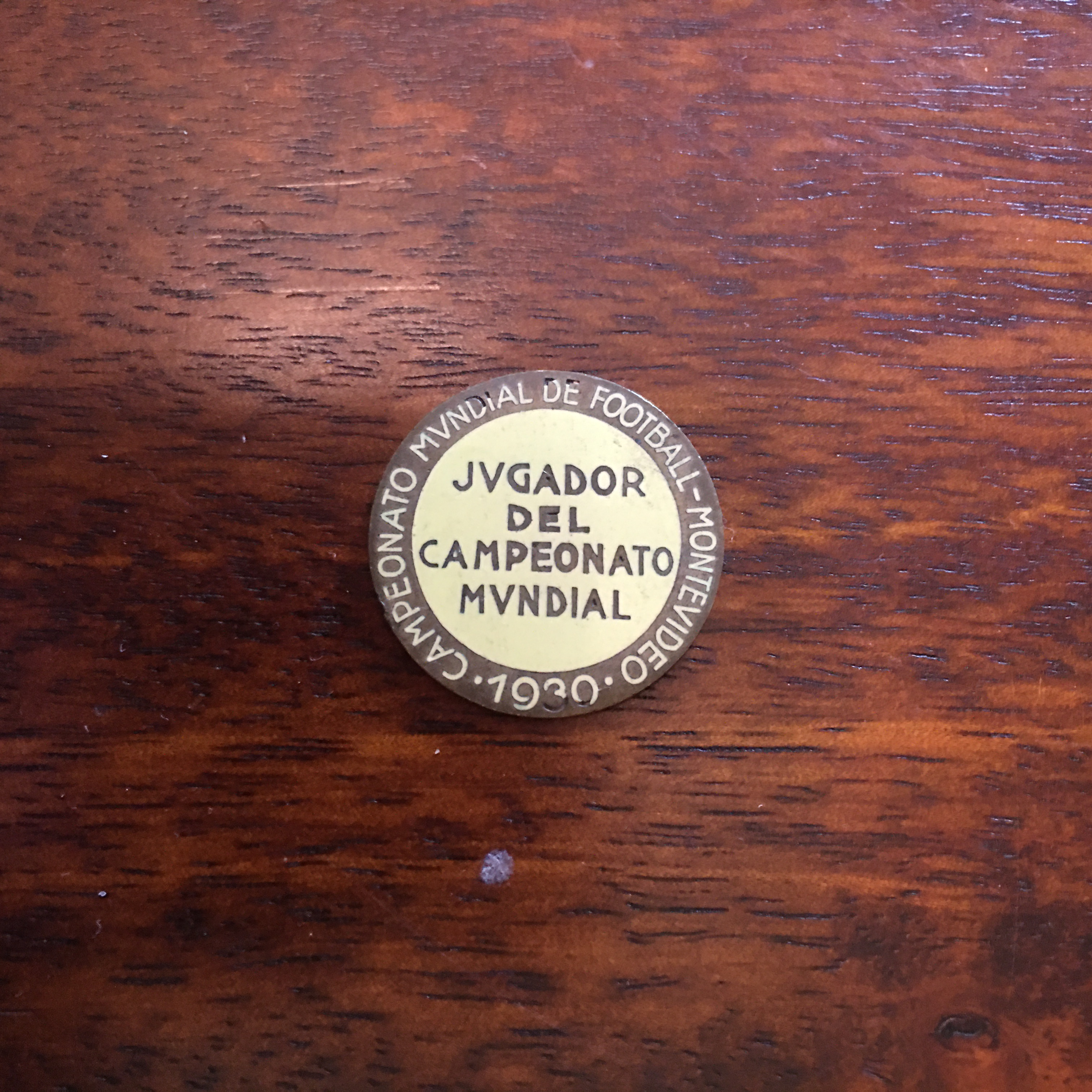
Medal to Diógenes Lara for 1930 FIFA World Cup

Diógenes Lara (6 April 1903 – 16 September 1968) was a Bolivian footballer who played as a midfielder. He was also a lieutenant in the Bolivian army.

== Career ==
He made two appearances for the Bolivia national team at the 1930 FIFA World Cup in the team, "New Players", winning a medal during the first Soccer World Cup in history. From 1945 to 1946, he then managed the national team.
