= Boško Simonović =

Serbian footballer (1898–1965)

Personal information
- Date of birth: 12 February 1898
- Place of birth: Šid, Austria-Hungary
- Date of death: 5 August 1965 (aged 67)
- Place of death: Belgrade, SFR Yugoslavia
- Position: Goalkeeper

Senior career*
Years	Team	Apps	(Gls)
- SK Srpski mač
- BSK Beograd

Managerial career
- 1929: Vojvodina
- 1930–1932: Kingdom of Yugoslavia
- 1933–1934: Kingdom of Yugoslavia
- 1935: Kingdom of Yugoslavia
- 1939: Kingdom of Yugoslavia
- 1939–1940: Kingdom of Yugoslavia
- * Club domestic league appearances and goals

Boško Simonović (Serbian Cyrillic: Бoшкo Cимoнoвић; 12 February 1898 – 5 August 1965) was a football coach, player, referee, and administrator. His most notable feat was coaching the Kingdom of Yugoslavia national team at the first World Cup in 1930 in Uruguay.

Though an architect by vocation, Simonović never worked in the profession he was trained for, instead devoting his whole life to sports – particularly football.

He played football as a goalkeeper in SK Srpski mač and later in BSK. Following a playing career he became a football referee and was the first Serb to referee an international match, in 1923 in Bucharest. He retired from refereeing following a broken leg in a sledding accident.
