= Renato Sáinz =

Bolivian footballer (1899-1982)

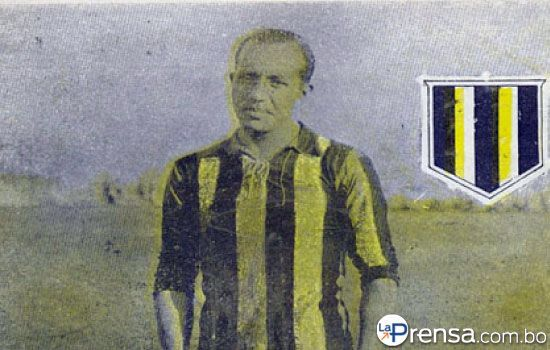

Personal information
- Full name: Renato Sainz Loza
- Date of birth: 14 December 1899
- Place of birth: La Paz, Bolivia
- Date of death: 28 December 1982 (aged 83)
- Position: Midfielder

Senior career*
Years	Team	Apps	(Gls)
1926–1930	The Strongest	?	(?)

International career
1926–1930	Bolivia	6	(0)
- * Club domestic league appearances and goals

Renato Sáinz Loza (14 December 1899 – 28 December 1982) was a Bolivian footballer who played as a midfielder. During his career he played for The Strongest and made one appearance for the Bolivia national team at the 1930 FIFA World Cup.

== Achievements ==
- First Division - Pre-National Federation Era: 1

1930
