= Jorge Valderrama =

Bolivian footballer (1906–1964)

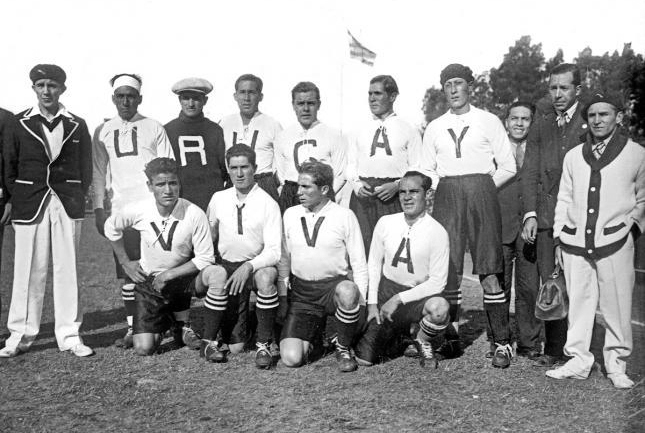
- Bolivia national football team line-up on July 17, 1930, right before the match against Yugoslavia. Valderrama is the one wearing the "I" shirt.

Personal information
- Full name: Jorge Luis Valderrama
- Date of birth: December 12, 1906
- Place of birth: Bolivia
- Date of death: December 1964 (aged 58 or 57)
- Position: Midfielder

Senior career*
Years	Team	Apps	(Gls)
1926–1927	Club Bolivar Nimbles		
1929–1930	Oruro Royal		

International career
1926–1930	Bolivia	7	(0)
- * Club domestic league appearances and goals

Jorge Luis Valderrama (12 December 1906 – December 1964) was a Bolivian football midfielder.

== Career ==
During his career he made two appearances for the Bolivia national team at the 1930 FIFA World Cup. He played for Club Bolívar Nimbles during 1926-1927. His final club was Oruro Royal.
