= Juan Argote =

Bolivian footballer (1907-1990)

Juan Jorge Argote
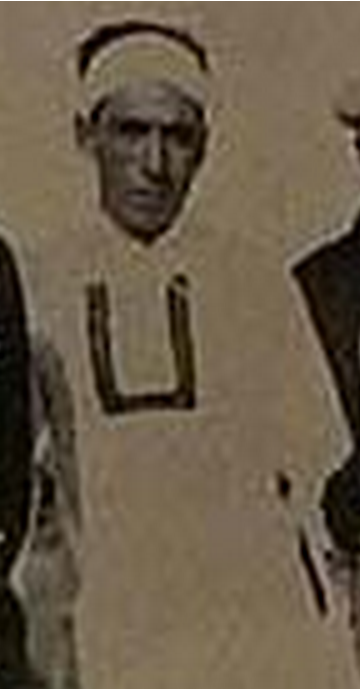

Personal information
- Date of birth: 6 January 1907
- Place of birth: Cochabamba, Bolivia
- Date of death: 13 September 1990 (aged 83)
- Height: 1.70 m (5 ft 7 in)
- Position: Midfielder

Senior career*
| Years | Team | Apps | (Gls) |
| 1929–1931 | Club Bolívar | | |

International career
| 1930 | Bolivia | 1 | (0) |
- * Club domestic league appearances and goals

Juan Jorge Argote (6 January 1907 - 13 September 1990) was a Bolivian footballer who played as a midfielder for Club Racin Oruro and Club Bolívar.

== Career ==
During his career who made one appearances for the Bolivia national team at the 1930 FIFA World Cup. His career in club football was spent in Club Bolivar between 1929 and 1931
