= Hungary national football team results (1930–1949) =

This article provides details of international football games played by the Hungary national football team from 1930 to 1949.

== Results ==
=== 1930 ===
13 April 1930 Friendly	Switzerland	2–2	Hungary	Switzerland
15:00	Baumeister 7'; Ramseyer 65'	Report	Toldi 37', 63'	Attendance: 20,000; Referee: Albert Prince-Cox (England)

1 May 1930 Friendly	Czechoslovakia	1–1	Hungary	Czechoslovakia
16:30	Hojer 73'	Report	Hirzer 3'	Attendance: 24,000; Referee: Per Andersen (Denmark)

11 May 1930 1927–30 Central European Cup	Hungary	0–5	Italy	Budapest, Hungary
16:30		Report	Meazza 17', 65', 70'; Magnozzi 72'; Costantino 84'	Stadium: Üllői úti stadion Attendance: 40,000; Referee: Peco Bauwens (Germany)

1 June 1930 Friendly	Hungary	2–1	Austria	Hungary
17:30	Kohut 5'; Turay 54'	Report	Adelbrecht 90'	Attendance: 20,000; Referee: Willem Eijmers (Denmark)

8 June 1930 Friendly	Hungary	6–2	Netherlands	Hungary
17:30	Turay 15', 56'; Avar 40', 44', 69' (pen.); Toldi 53'	Report	van der Heijden 48'; Landaal 90'	Attendance: 14,000; Referee: Peco Bauwens (Germany)

21 September 1930 Friendly	Austria	2–3	Hungary	Vienna, Austria
	Weselik 26'; Gschweidl 60'	Report	Turay 27', 79'; Titkos 30'	Stadium: Hohe Warte Stadium; Attendance: 50,000; Referee: Albino Carraro (Austria)

28 September 1930 Friendly	Germany	5–3	Hungary	Germany
15:00	Hofmann 59'; Hofmann 61', 86'; Ludwig 83'; Lachner 78'	Report	Takács 29', 35', 40'	Attendance: 41,500; Referee: Lauritz Andersen (Denmark)

26 October 1930 Friendly	Hungary	1–1	Czechoslovakia	Hungary
	Titkos 1'	Report	Šoltys 48'	Attendance: 12,000; Referee: Peco Bauwens (Germany)

=== 1931 ===
22 March 1931 1931–32 Central European Cup	Czechoslovakia	3–3	Hungary	Prague, Czechoslovakia
	Svoboda 35', 66'; Junek 45'	Report	Avar 11', 33', 53'	Stadium: Stadion Letná; Attendance: 26,700; Referee: Peco Bauwens (Germany)

12 April 1931 1931–32 Central European Cup	Hungary	6–2	Switzerland	Budapest, Hungary
	Avar 3', 71', 87'; Szábo 35' (pen.); Kalmár 75'; Tänzer 76'	Report	A. Abegglen 4', 8'	Stadium: Hungária körúti stadion Attendance: 25,000; Referee: Rinaldo Barlassina (Italy)

3 May 1931 1931–32 Central European Cup	Austria	0–0	Hungary	Vienna, Austria
		Report		Stadium: Hohe Warte Stadium; Attendance: 43,000; Referee: René Mercet (Switzerland)

21 May 1931 Friendly	Yugoslavia (Kingdom of Yugoslavia)	3–2	Hungary	Belgrade, Yugoslavia
	Marjanović 19'; Hitrec 55'; Lemešić 83'	Report	Avar 35', 50'	Stadium: Beogradski SK Stadium; Attendance: 12,000; Referee: Emil Gobel (Austria)

20 September 1931 Friendly	Hungary	3–0	Czechoslovakia	Hungary
14:00	Turay 10'; Avar 32'; Kalmár 32'	Report		Attendance: 10,000; Referee: Peco Bauwens (Germany)

4 October 1931 1931–32 Central European Cup	Hungary	2–2	Austria	Budapest, Hungary
	Szábo 42' (pen.); Spitz 65'	Report	Zischek 56', 86'	Stadium: Hungária körúti stadion Attendance: 32,000; Referee: Peco Bauwens (Germany)

8 November 1931 Friendly	Hungary	3–1	Sweden	Hungary
	Spitz 37'; Avar 34', 56'	Report	Rydell 9'	Attendance: 13,000; Referee: Rinaldo Barlassina (Italy)

13 December 1931 1931–32 Central European Cup	Italy	3–2	Hungary	Turin, Kingdom of Italy
	Libonatti 22'; Orsi 56'; Cesarini 90'	Report	Avar 53', 60'	Stadium: Stadio Filadelfia; Attendance: 40,000; Referee: René Mercet (Switzerland)

=== 1932 ===
19 February 1932 Friendly	Egypt	0–0	Hungary	Egypt
15:00		Report		Attendance: 6,500; Referee: Rinaldo Barlassina (Italy)

20 March 1932 Friendly	Czechoslovakia	1–3	Hungary	Czechoslovakia
16:00	Silný 51'	Report	Turay 64'; Závodi 65'; Toldi 71'	Attendance: 26,000; Referee: Sophus Hansen (Denmark)

24 April 1932 Friendly	Austria	8–2	Hungary	Austria
	Sindelar 3', 13', 31'; Schall 33', 50', 70', 73'; Gschweidl 52'	Report	Cseh 14', 44'	Attendance: 60,000; Referee: Alfred Birlem (Germany)

8 May 1932 1931–32 Central European Cup	Hungary	1–1	Italy	Budapest, Hungary
	Toldi 44' (pen.)	Report	Constantino 4'	Stadium: Hungária körúti stadion Attendance: 40,000; Referee: Sophus Hansen (Denmark)

19 June 1932 1931–32 Central European Cup	Switzerland	3–1	Hungary	Bern, Switzerland
	von Känel 47'; Passello 64'; A. Abegglen 81'	Report	Weiler 79' (o.g.)	Stadium: Wankdorf Stadium; Attendance: 22,000; Referee: Stanley Rous (England)

18 September 1932 1931–32 Central European Cup	Hungary	2–1	Czechoslovakia	Budapest, Hungary
16:00 UTC+1	Toldi 78'; Titkos 81'	Report	Puč 73'	Stadium: Üllői úti stadion Attendance: 25,000; Referee: Otto Ohlsson (Sweden)

2 October 1932 Friendly	Hungary	2–3	Austria	Budapest, Hungary
	Toldi 78'; Titkos 81'	Report	Puč 73'	Stadium: Üllői úti stadion Attendance: 25,000; Referee: Otto Ohlsson (Sweden)

30 October 1932 Friendly	Hungary	2–1	Germany	Hungary
	Déri 11'; Turay 80'	Report	Malik 71'	Attendance: 15,000; Referee: Albino Carraro (Italy)

27 November 1932 Friendly	Italy	4–2	Hungary	Milan, Italy
14:30 CET (UTC+01:00)	Orsi 26', 35'; Meazza 52'; Ferrari 79'	Report	Béla 40' (pen.); Markos 86'	Stadium: San Siro; Attendance: 32,000; Referee: William Bangerter (Switzerland)

=== 1933 ===
29 January 1933 Friendly	Portugal	1–0	Hungary	Portugal
	Pinga 36'	Report		Attendance: 15,000; Referee: Ramón Melcón (Spain)

5 March 1933 Friendly	Netherlands	1–2	Hungary	Netherlands
	Bihámy 37'	Report	van den Broek 24'; Teleky 73'	Attendance: 30,000; Referee: John Langenus (Belgium)

19 March 1933 Friendly	Hungary	2–0	Czechoslovakia	Hungary
16:00	Turay 22'; Cseh 71'	Report		Attendance: 25,000; Referee: William Bangerter (Switzerland)

30 April 1933 Friendly	Hungary	1–1	Austria	Budapest, Hungary
	Markos 85'	Report	Ostermann 35'	Stadium: Üllői úti stadion Attendance: 38,000; Referee: Rinaldo Barlassina (Italy)

2 July 1933 Friendly	Sweden	5–2	Hungary	Sweden
	Persson 49'; Karlsson 56'; Bunke 58', 89'; Nilsson 65'	Report	Sárosi 20'; Toldi 57'	Attendance: 18,569; Referee: Sophus Hansen (Denmark)

17 September 1933 1933–35 Central European Cup	Hungary	3–0	Switzerland	Budapest, Hungary
	Avar 7', 77'; Minelli 66' (o.g.)	Report		Stadium: Hungária körúti stadion Attendance: 17,000; Referee: Hans Frankenstein (Austria)

1 October 1933 Friendly	Austria	2–2	Hungary	Vienna, Austria
	Müller 15'; Schall 34'	Report	Avar 82'; Polgár 85'	Stadium: Praterstadion; Attendance: 60,000; Referee: Francesco Mattea (Italy)

22 October 1933 1933–35 Central European Cup	Hungary	0–1	Italy	Budapest, Hungary
		Report	Borel 43'	Stadium: Üllői úti stadion Attendance: 38,000; Referee: Stanley Rous (England)

=== 1934 ===
14 January 1934 Friendly	Germany	3–1	Hungary	Germany
	Lachner 17'; Stubb 55'; Conen 80'	Report	Polgár 30' (pen.)	Attendance: 38,000; Referee: Louis Baert (Belgium)

25 March 1934 1934 FIFA World Cup qualification	Bulgaria	1–4	Hungary	Sofia, Bulgaria
	Baikushev 27'	Report	Sárosi 29'; Szabó 61' (pen.); Toldi 88'; Markos 89'	Stadium: A.S. 23 Stadium; Attendance: 10,000; Referee: Denis Xifando (Romania)

15 April 1934 Friendly	Austria	5–2	Hungary	Austria
	Zischek 6'; Viertl 21'; Schall 30'; Bican 59', 73'	Report	Sárosi 1', 28'	Attendance: 55,000; Referee: Gustav Krist (Czechoslovakia)

29 April 1934 1933–35 Central European Cup	Czechoslovakia	2–2	Hungary	Prague, Czechoslovakia
	Sobotka 2'; Puč 42'	Report	Sárosi 30', 56'	Stadium: Letenský Stadion; Attendance: 30,000; Referee: Francesco Mattea (Italy)

29 April 1934 1934 FIFA World Cup qualification	Hungary	4–1	Bulgaria	Budapest, Hungary
	Szabó 9', 58'; Solti 60', 73'	Report	Todorov 61'	Stadium: Hungária-körút; Attendance: 10,000; Referee: Hans Frankenstein (Austria)

10 May 1934 Friendly	Hungary	2–1	England	Hungary
	Avar 56'; Sárosi 69'	Report	Tilson 84'	Attendance: 35,000; Referee: Rinaldo Barlassina (Italy)

27 May 1934 1934 FIFA World Cup Round of 16	Hungary	4–2	Egypt	Stadio Giorgio Ascarelli, Naples
	Teleki 11'; Toldi 31', 61'; Vincze 53'	Report	Fawzi 35', 39'	Attendance: 9,000; Referee: Rinaldo Barlassina (Italy)

31 May 1934 1934 FIFA World Cup quarter-finals	Austria	2–1	Hungary	Stadio Littoriale, Bologna
	Horvath 8'; Zischek 51'	Report	Sárosi 60' (pen.)	Attendance: 23,000; Referee: Francesco Mattea (Italy)

7 October 1934 1933–35 Central European Cup	Hungary	3–1	Austria	Budapest, Kingdom of Hungary
	Sárosi 34', 47'; Toldi 84'	Report	Zischek 17'	Stadium: Hungária körúti stadion Attendance: 33,000; Referee: Rinaldo Barlassina (Italy)

9 December 1934 Friendly	Italy	4–2	Hungary	Milan, Italy
	Guaita 27', 37'; Ferrari 63'; Meazza 83'	Report	Sárosi 18'; Avar 39'	Stadium: San Siro; Attendance: 45,000; Referee: Alois Beranek (Austria)

16 December 1934 Friendly	Ireland (Republic of Ireland)	2–4	Hungary	Ireland
14:30	Donnelly 36'; Bermingham 62' (pen.)	Report	Avar 19', 85'; Vincze 30'; Markos 86'	Attendance: 25,000; Referee: John Langenus (Belgium)

=== 1935 ===
14 April 1935 1933–35 Central European Cup	Switzerland	6–2	Hungary	Zürich, Switzerland
	Jäck 8'; Kielholz 21', 35', 57'; Abegglen 40', 63'	Report	Cseh 59', 72' (pen.)	Stadium: Hardturm; Attendance: 30,000; Referee: Walter Lewington (England)

12 May 1935 Friendly	Hungary	6–3	Austria	Budapest, Hungary
	Titkos 5', 15', (red card) 88'; Sárosi 7', 73', 76'; Toldi 80'	Report	Zischek 17', 28'; Durspekt 58'	Stadium: Üllői úti stadion Attendance: 32,000; Referee: Rinaldo Barlassina (Italy)

19 May 1935 Friendly	France	2–0	Hungary	France
15:00	Courtois 37', 72'	Report		Attendance: 25,000; Referee: Walter Lewington (England)

22 September 1935 1933–35 Central European Cup	Hungary	1–0	Czechoslovakia	Budapest, Hungary
	Markos 60'	Report		Stadium: Hungária körúti stadion Attendance: 22,000; Referee: John Langenus (Belgium)

6 October 1935 1933–35 Central European Cup	Austria	4–4	Hungary	Vienna, Austria
14:30	Bican 7', 11', 58'; Hofmann 66'	Report	Toldi 6'; Vincze 8', 30'; Sárosi 21'	Stadium: Praterstadion; Attendance: 40,000; Referee: Karl Wunderlin (Switzerland)

10 November 1935 Friendly	Hungary	6–1	Switzerland	Hungary
	Cseh 21'; Toldi 39'; Vincze 44', 90'; Sárosi 66', 82'	Report	Abegglen 72'	Attendance: 16,000; Referee: Rinaldo Barlassina (Italy)

24 November 1935 1933–35 Central European Cup	Italy	2–2	Hungary	Milan, Italy
	Colaussi 69'; Ferrari 70'	Report	Sárosi 43', 79'	Stadium: Arena Civica; Attendance: 26,000; Referee: Hans Wüthrich (Switzerland)

=== 1936 ===
15 March 1936 Friendly	Hungary	3–2	Germany	Hungary
	Titkos 14'; Cseh 53'; Sárosi 83'	Report	Urban 32'; Lenz 48'	Attendance: 35,000; Referee: Gustav Krist (Czechoslovakia)

5 April 1936 Friendly	Austria	3–5	Hungary	Vienna, Austria
16:30	Zischek 17'; Bican 46', 88'	Report	Cseh 16', 23'; Kállai 35', 72', 87'	Stadium: Hohe Warte Stadium; Attendance: 40,000; Referee: Lucien Leclerq (France)

3 May 1936 Friendly	Hungary	3–3	(Republic of Ireland) Ireland	Hungary
15:00	Sárosi 7', 48'; Sas 75'	Report	Dunne 12', 68'; O'Reilly 19'	Attendance: 15,000; Referee: Julius Brüll (Czechoslovakia)

31 May 1936 Friendly	Hungary	1–2	Italy	Budapest, Hungary
	Turay 70'	Report	Pasinati 31'; Meazza 77'	Stadium: Hidegkuti Nándor Stadium; Attendance: 32,000; Referee: Adolf Miesz (Austria)

27 September 1936 1936–38 Central European Cup	Hungary	5–3	Austria	Budapest, Hungary
	Toldi 15', 29', 63'; Cseh 40'; Titkos 72'	Report	Binder 2'; Sindelar 27', 64'	Stadium: Üllői úti stadion Attendance: 25,000; Referee: Lucien Leclerq (France)

4 October 1936 Friendly	Romania	1–2	Hungary	Bucharest, Romania
	Bindea 24'	Report	Lázár 65'; Toldi 83'	Stadium: Stadionul ONEF; Attendance: 35,000; Referee: John Langenus (Belgium)

18 October 1936 1936–38 Central European Cup	Czechoslovakia	5–2	Hungary	Prague, Czechoslovakia
	Kloz 27', 30', 79', 82'; Kopecký 87'	Report	Titkos 7'; Toldi 33'	Stadium: Generali Arena; Attendance: 22,000; Referee: Walter Lewington (England)

2 December 1936 Friendly	England	6–2	Hungary	England
14:00	Brook 25'; Drake 32', 40', 65'; Britton 52'; Carter 87'	Report	Cseh 29'; Vincze 48'	Attendance: 36,000; Referee: Lucien Leclerq (France)

6 December 1936 Friendly	Ireland (Republic of Ireland)	2–3	Hungary	Ireland
	Fallon 20'; Davis 72' (pen.)	Report	Titkos 37'; Cseh 38'; Toldi 48'	Attendance: 27,000; Referee: Harry Nattrass (England)

=== 1937 ===
11 April 1937 1936–38 Central European Cup	Switzerland	1–5	Hungary	Basel, Switzerland
	Aeby 58'	Report	Sárosi 26'; Zsengellér 41', 61', 71'; Dudas 77'	Stadium: Stadion Rankhof; Attendance: 16,000; Referee: John Langenus (Belgium)

25 April 1937 1936–38 Central European Cup	Italy	2–0	Hungary	Turin, Italy
	Colaussi 33'; Frossi 81'	Report		Stadium: Stadio Municipale Benito Mussolini; Attendance: 28,000; Referee: William Bangerter (Switzerland)

9 May 1937 Friendly	Hungary	1–1	Yugoslavia	Budapest, Hungary
17:00 (+1:00)	Cseh 60'	Report	Lešnik 42'	Stadium: Üllői úti Stadion; Attendance: 16,000; Referee: Rinadlo Barlassina (Italy)

23 May 1937 Friendly	Hungary	2–2	Austria	Budapest, Hungary
	Sas 2'; Cseh 85'	Report	Pesser 13', 45'	Stadium: Üllői úti stadion Attendance: 17,000; Referee: John Langenus (Belgium)

19 September 1937 1936–38 Central European Cup	Hungary	8–3	Czechoslovakia	Budapest, Hungary
	Zsengellér 15'; Sárosi 34', 51', 60', 62', 77', 80', 85'	Report	Riha 21'; Rulc 26'; Nejedlý 65'	Stadium: Hungaria uti Attendance: 27,000; Referee: Peco Bauwens (Germany)

10 October 1937 1936–38 Central European Cup	Austria	1–2	Hungary	Vienna, Austria
	Stroh 76'	Report	Sárosi 21'; Cseh 78'	Stadium: Praterstadion; Attendance: 44,000; Referee: Charles Argent (England)

14 November 1937 1936–38 Central European Cup	Hungary	2–0	Switzerland	Budapest, Hungary
	Sárosi 3'; Toldi 74'	Report		Stadium: Üllői úti stadion Attendance: 12,000; Referee: Mika Popovic (Yugoslavia)

=== 1938 ===
9 January 1938 Friendly	Portugal	4–0	Hungary	Lisbon, Portugal
15:00	Espírito Santo 14'; Cruz 15', 72'; Soeiro 48'	Report		Stadium: Estádio JM Soares; Attendance: 10,000; Referee: Georges Capdeville (France)

16 January 1938 Friendly	Luxembourg	0–6	Hungary	Luxembourg City, Luxembourg
		Report	Szendrődi 13', 59' (82); Kállai 73'; Zsengellér 75' (pen.); Miklósi 80'	Stadium: Stade Municipal; Attendance: 4,500; Referee: Peco Bauwens (Germany)

20 March 1938 Friendly	Germany	1–1	Hungary	Germany
14:30	Siffling 29'	Report	Toldi 49'	Attendance: 53,000; Referee: John Langenus (Belgium)

25 March 1938 1938 FIFA World Cup qualification	Hungary	11–1	Greece	Budapest, Hungary
	Zsengellér 14', 23' (pen.), 24', 65', 81', 83'; Titkos 17', 65'; Vincze 26'; Nemes 36', 40', 51'	Report	Makris 89'	Stadium: Hungária körúti stadion Attendance: 12,000; Referee: Denis Xifando (Romania)

5 June 1938 1938 World Cup Round of 16	Hungary	6–0	Dutch East Indies	Reims, France
17:00	Kohut 13'; Toldi 15'; Sárosi 28', 89'; Zsengellér 35', 76'	Report		Stadium: Vélodrome Municipal; Attendance: 9,000; Referee: Roger Conrié (France)

12 June 1938 1938 World Cup quarter-finals	Hungary	2–0	Switzerland	Lille, France
17:00	Sárosi 40'; Zsengellér 89'	Report		Stadium: Stade Victor Boucquey; Attendance: 15,000; Referee: Rinaldo Barlassina (Italy)

16 June 1938 1938 World Cup Semi-finals	Hungary	5–1	Sweden	Paris, France
18:00 WEST (UTC+01:00)	Jacobsson 19' (o.g.); Titkos 37'; Zsengellér 39', 85'; Sárosi 65'	Report	Nyberg 1'	Stadium: Parc des Princes; Attendance: 20,000; Referee: Lucien Leclerq (France)

19 June 1938 1938 FIFA World Cup Final	Italy	4–2	Hungary	Paris, France
17:00 (WEST)	Colaussi 6', 35'; Piola 16', 82'	Report	Titkos 8'; Sárosi 70'	Stadium: Stade Olympique de Colombes; Attendance: 45,000; Referee: Georges Capdeville (France)

7 December 1938 Friendly	Scotland	3–1	Hungary	Scotland
15:00	Walker 19' (pen.); Black 26'; Gillick 29'	Report	Sárosi 72' (pen.)	Attendance: 23,000; Referee: Harry Nattrass (England)

=== 1939 ===
26 February 1939 Friendly	Netherlands	3–2	Hungary	Netherlands
14:30	Vente 38', 46' de Harder 80'	Report	Zsengellér 6'; Gyetvai 78'	Attendance: 26,000; Referee: Laurie Dale (England)

16 March 1939 Friendly	France	2–2	Hungary	Paris, France
	Benbarek 15'; Heisserer 87'	Report	Kiszely 17', 56'	Stadium: Parc des Princes; Attendance: 27,367; Referee: Walter Lewington (England)

19 March 1939 Friendly	Ireland (Republic of Ireland)	2–2	Hungary	Ireland
	Bradshaw 14'; Carey 65'	Report	Zsengellér 35'; Kolláth 50'	Attendance: 12,000; Referee: Harry Nattrass (England)

2 April 1939 Friendly	Switzerland	3–1	Hungary	Switzerland
	Aeby 43'; Aebi 74'; Walaschek 80'	Report	Déri 54'	Attendance: 17,000; Referee: Raffaele Scorzoni (Italy)

18 May 1939 Friendly	Hungary	2–2	(Republic of Ireland) Ireland	Hungary
	Kolláth 41', 86'	Report	O'Flanagan 53', 80'	Referee: Peco Bauwens (Germany)

8 June 1939 Friendly	Hungary	1–3	Italy	Budapest, Hungary
	Kiszely 77'	Report	Piola 2'; Colaussi 59', 65'	Stadium: Üllői úti stadion Attendance: 36,000; Referee: Thomas Thompson (England)

27 August 1939 Friendly	Poland	4–2	Hungary	Warsaw, Poland
16:30 (UTC+1:00)	Wilimowski 33', 62', 75'; Piątek 74' (pen.)	Report	Zsengellér 14'; Ádám 28'	Stadium: Polish Army Stadium; Attendance: 21,000; Referee: Esko Pekonen (Finland)

24 September 1939 Friendly	Hungary	5–1	Germany	Hungary
15:30	Kincses 5'; Zsengellér 8', 51', 73'; Dudás 79'	Report	Lehner 38'	Attendance: 25,000; Referee: Generoso Dattilo (Italy)

22 October 1939 Friendly	Romania	1–1	Hungary	Bucharest, Romania
Report	Spielmann 78'		Tóth 74'	Stadium: Stadionul Agenţia Naţională de Educaţie Fizică; Attendance: 25,000; Referee: (Italy) Generoso Dattilo

12 November 1939 Friendly	Yugoslavia	0–2	Hungary	Belgrade, Yugoslavia
		Report	Sárosi 28'; Tóth 72'	Stadium: Beogradski SK Stadium; Attendance: 18,000; Referee: Hans Wüthrich (Switzerland)

=== 1940 ===
31 March 1940 Friendly	Hungary	3–0	Switzerland	Hungary
15:30	Sárosi 25', 64'; Sütő 32'	Report		Attendance: 25,000; Referee: Miljenko Podubsky (Yugoslavia)

7 April 1940 Friendly	Germany	2–2	Hungary	Germany
15:00	Gauchel 3'; Binder 25'	Report	Toldi 4'; Sárosi 45'	Attendance: 90,000; Referee: Louis Baert (Belgium)

2 May 1940 1940-41 Danube Cup	Hungary	1–0	Croatia	Budapest, Hungary
	Dudás 86'	Report		Stadium: Üllői út Attendance: 18,000; Referee: Constantin Rădulescu (Romania)

19 May 1940 1940-41 Danube Cup	Hungary	2–0	Romania	Budapest, Hungary
	György 68'; László 74'	Report		Stadium: Üllői út Attendance: 20,000; Referee: Mika Popović (Yugoslavia)

29 September 1940 Friendly tournament	Hungary	0–0	Yugoslavia	Budapest, Hungary
		Report		Stadium: Üllői úti Stadion; Attendance: 20,000; Referee: Alois Beranek (Austria)

6 October 1940 Friendly	Hungary	2–2	Germany	Hungary
15:00	Kiszely 31'; Kincses 61'	Report	Lehner 24'; Hahnemann 58'	Attendance: 32,000; Referee: Generoso Dattilo (Italy)

1 December 1940 Friendly	Italy	1–1	Hungary	Genoa, Italy
	Trevisan 14'	Report	Bodola 62'	Stadium: Stadio Luigi Ferraris; Attendance: 30,000; Referee: Peco Bauwens (Germany)

8 December 1940 Friendly	Croatia (Independent State of Croatia)	1–1	Hungary	Zagreb, Croatia, Yugoslavia
	Wölfl 10'	Report	Spielmann 26'	Stadium: Igralište Građanskog; Attendance: 8,000; Referee: Giuseppe Scarpi (Italy)

=== 1941 ===
23 March 1941 1940-41 Danube Cup	Yugoslavia	1–1	Hungary	Belgrade, Yugoslavia
	Valjarević 43'	Report	Gyetvai 8'	Stadium: Beogradski SK Stadium; Attendance: 15,000; Referee: Raffaele Scorzoni (Italy)

6 April 1941 Friendly	Germany	7–0	Hungary	Germany
15:00	Janes 24' (pen.); Walter 28'; Kobierski 33'; Hahnemann 51', 67'; Hahnemann 62', 81'	Report		Attendance: 65,000; Referee: Pedro Escartín (Spain)

16 November 1941 Friendly	Switzerland	1–2	Hungary	Switzerland
	Monnard 77'	Report	Covaci 45'; Olajkár 74'	Attendance: 22,000; Referee: Peco Bauwens (Germany)

=== 1942 ===
3 May 1942 Friendly	Hungary	3–5	Germany	Hungary
	Nagymarosi 18' (pen.); Zsengellér 30'; Tihanyi 45'	Report	Walter 16', 65'; Janes 59'; Dörfel 70'; Sing 89'	Attendance: 38,000; Referee: Rinaldo Barlassina (Italy)

14 June 1942 Friendly	Hungary	1–1	Croatia	Budapest, Hungary
	Szusza 60'	Report	Pleše 78'; Kacian (red card) 87'	Stadium: Üllői út Attendance: 35,000; Referee: Friedrich Müller (Germany)

1 November 1942 Friendly	Hungary	3–0	Switzerland	Hungary
	Bodola 30'; Németh 73'; Tóth 79'	Report		Attendance: 38,000; Referee: Helmut Fink (Germany)

=== 1943 ===
16 May 1943 Friendly	Switzerland	1–3	Hungary	Switzerland
	Monnard 16'	Report	Zsengellér 43'; Bodola 32', 43'	Attendance: 23,000; Referee: Peco Bauwens Germany

6 June 1943 Friendly	Bulgaria	2–4	Hungary	Bulgaria
	Milev 61'; Spasov 81'	Report	Zsengellér 3', 14', 8', 69'	Attendance: 15,000; Referee: Antun Marek (Croatia)

12 September 1943 Friendly	Sweden	2–3	Hungary	Sweden
	Nordahl 8', 40'; Tóth 72'	Report	Zsengellér 11'; Spielmann 50'; Leander 76' (o.g.)	Attendance: 38,000; Referee: Max Viinioksa (Finland)

15 September 1943 Friendly	Finland	0–3	Hungary	Finland
		Report	Tóth 11', 47'; Spielmann 35'	Attendance: 9,662; Referee: Ivan Eklind (Sweden)

7 November 1943 Friendly	Hungary	2–7	Sweden	Hungary
	Szusza 28', 45'	Report	Karlsson 14'; Nyberg 42', 87'; Nilsson 46', 75'; Nordahl 51', 71'	Stadium: 15:00; Attendance: 38,000; Referee: Adolf Miesz (Germany)

=== 1945 ===
19 August 1945 Friendly	Hungary	2–0	Austria	Budapest, Hungary
	Rudas 18'; Zsengellér 32'	Report		Stadium: Üllői úti stadion Attendance: 40,000; Referee: György Szigeti (Hungary)

20 August 1945 Friendly	Hungary	5–2	Austria	Budapest, Hungary
	Puskás 12'; Szusza 13', 56'; Zsengellér 15'; Vincze 38'	Report	Kominek 22'; Decker 44'	Stadium: Üllői úti stadion Attendance: 20,000; Referee: Pál Hertzka (Hungary)

30 September 1945 Friendly	Hungary	7–2	Romania	Budapest, Hungary
	Hidegkuti 8', 87'; Puskás 15', 69'; Zsengellér 25'; Rudas 32'; Nyers 33'	Report	20' Fabian; 40' Petschovschi	Stadium: Üllői út Attendance: 35000; Referee: Pál Hertzka

=== 1946 ===
14 April 1946 Friendly	Austria	3–2	Hungary	Vienna, Austria

6 October 1946 Friendly	Hungary	2–0	Austria	Budapest, Hungary

30 October 1946 Friendly	Luxembourg	2–7	Hungary	Esch-sur-Alzette, Luxembourg

=== 1947 ===
4 May 1947 Friendly	Hungary	5–2	Austria	Budapest, Hungary

11 May 1947 Friendly	Italy	3–2	Hungary	Turin, Italy

29 June 1947 1947 Balkan Cup	Yugoslavia	2–3	Hungary	Belgrade, Yugoslavia

17 August 1947 1947 Balkan Cup	Hungary	9–0	Bulgaria	Budapest, Hungary

20 August 1947 1947 Balkan Cup	Hungary	3–0	Albania	Budapest, Hungary

14 September 1947 Friendly	Austria	4–3	Hungary	Vienna, Austria

12 October 1947 1947 Balkan Cup	Romania	0–3	Hungary	Bucharest, Romania

=== 1948 ===
21 April 1948 1948–53 Central European Cup	Hungary	7–4	Switzerland	Budapest, Hungary
	Puskás 1', 88'; Deák 42', 86'; Gőcze 74'; Egresi 78'; Szusza 86'	Report	Lusenti 5'; Amadò 30'; Maillard 31'; Tamini 87'	Stadium: Üllői úti stadion Attendance: 32,000; Referee: Karl Czerny (Austria)

2 May 1948 1948–53 Central European Cup	Austria	3–2	Hungary	Vienna, Austria
	Melchior 20'; Wagner 67' (pen.); Körner 84'	Report	Szusza 15'; Deák 48'	Stadium: Praterstadion; Attendance: 57,000; Referee: Jaroslav Vlček (Czechoslovakia)

23 May 1948 1948 Balkan Cup	Albania	0–0	Hungary	Tirana, Albania
		Report		Stadium: Qemal Stafa Stadium; Attendance: 20,000; Referee: Leo Lemešić (Yugoslavia)

23 May 1948 1948 Balkan Cup and 1948–53 Central European Cup	Hungary	2–1	Czechoslovakia	Budapest, Hungary
	Egresi 16'; Deák 73'	Report	Schubert 81'	Stadium: Üllői út Attendance: 32,000; Referee: Marijan Matančić (Yugoslavia)

6 June 1948 1948 Balkan Cup	Hungary	9–0	Romania	Újpest, Hungary
	Mészáros 30', 46'; Egresi 43', 61', 72'; Puskás 58', 82'; Kocsis 67', 85'	Report		Stadium: Megyeri úti Stadion; Attendance: 45,000; Referee: Antun Mlinarić (Yugoslavia)

19 September 1948 1948 Balkan Cup	Poland	2–6	Hungary	Warsaw, Poland
	Kohut 37'; Cieślik 68'	Report	Bozsik 20'; Hidegkuti 25', 81'; Szusza 29'; Deák 69'; Tóth 72'	Stadium: Stadion Wojska Polskiego; Attendance: 40,000; Referee: Jaroslav Vlček (Czechoslovakia)

3 October 1948 Friendly	Hungary	2–1	Austria	Budapest, Hungary
	Deák 16'; Szusza 30'	Report	Melchior 41'	Stadium: Megyeri úti stadion Attendance: 30,000; Referee: Jaroslav Vlček (Czechoslovakia)

24 October 1948 1948 Balkan Cup	Romania	1–5	Hungary	Bucharest, Romania
	Pecsovszky 77'	Report	Puskás 44', 64', 83'; Deák 49', 68'	Stadium: Stadionul Republicii; Attendance: 40,000; Referee: Jaroslav Vlček (Czechoslovakia)

7 November 1948 1948 Balkan Cup	Bulgaria	1–0	Hungary	Sofia, Bulgaria
	Milanov 15'	Report		Stadium: Yunak Stadium; Attendance: 35,000; Referee: Constantin Iliescu (Romania)

=== 1949 ===
10 April 1949 1948–53 Central European Cup	Czechoslovakia	5–2	Hungary	Prague, Czechoslovakia
	Preis 43'; Šimanský 56'; Hlaváček 63', 66'; Pažický 71'	Report	Puskás 61'; Szusza 78'	Stadium: Stadion Československé Armády; Attendance: 55,000; Referee: Maksymilian Schneider (Poland)

8 May 1949 1948–53 Central European Cup	Hungary	6–1	Austria	Újpest, Hungary
	Deák 2', 49'; Kocsis 22'; Puskás 32', 82' (pen.), 89'	Report	Melchior 82'	Stadium: Megyeri úti Stadion; Attendance: 50,000; Referee: Jaroslav Vlček (Czechoslovakia)

12 June 1949 1948–53 Central European Cup	Hungary	1–1	Italy	Újpest, Hungary
18:00	Deák 29'	Report	Carapellese 11'	Stadium: Megyeri úti Stadion; Attendance: 45,000; Referee: Bill Evans (England)

19 June 1949 Friendly	Sweden	2–2	Hungary	Sweden
18:00	Jeppson 80'; Gren 86'	Report	Budai 26'; Kocsis 48'	Attendance: 37,781; Referee: Karel van der Meer (Netherlands)

10 July 1949 Friendly	Hungary	8–2	Poland	Hungary
17:30	Deák 14', 45', 51', 62'; Egresi 20'; Puskás 33', 86'; Keszthelyi 48'	Report	Kohut 73'; Mamoń 79'	Attendance: 28,000; Referee: Jozef Nemčovský (Czechoslovakia)

16 October 1949 Friendly	Austria	3–4	Hungary	Vienna, Austria
	Decker 2', 49' (pen.); Dienst 33'	Report	Puskás 9', 74' (pen.); Deák 23', 27'	Stadium: Praterstadion; Attendance: 65,000; Referee: William Evans (England)

30 October 1949 Friendly	Hungary	5–0	Bulgaria	Hungary
14:00	Deák 17'; Budai 57'; Rudas 67'; Puskás 70', 84'	Report		Attendance: 36,000; Referee: Jaroslav Vlček (Czechoslovakia)

20 November 1949 Friendly	Hungary	5–0	Sweden	Hungary
13:00	Kocsis 9', 49', 56'; Puskás 24'; Deák 70'	Report		Attendance: 46,000; Referee: George Reader (England)
