= List of Hungary national football team hat-tricks =

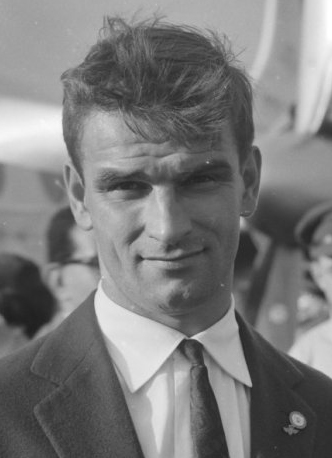
Sándor Kocsis holds the record for the most hat-tricks scored by a Hungarian player, with seven

Since Hungary's first international association football match in 1920, there have been 73 occasions when a Hungarian player has scored three or more goals (a hat-trick) in a game. The first hat-trick was scored by József Horváth against Bohemia on 7 April 1907. The record for the most goals scored in an international game by a Hungarian player is seven, which has been achieved on just one occasion: by György Sárosi against Austria in 1937, at the 1936–38 Central European International Cup.

Sándor Kocsis, Flórián Albert and László Kiss are the only Hungarian players to have scored a hat-trick at the world cup finals, with Sándor Kocsis doing it twice (including a poker) at the 1954 World Cup against South Korea and eventual champions West Germany. Two players have scored a hat-trick for the losing side: József Takács (3–5, 1930); and Ferenc Szusza (3–4, 1947).

== Hat-tricks scored by Hungary ==
No.	Player	Opponent	Goals	Score	Venue	Competition	Date	Ref(s)
1	József Horváth	Bohemia	3 – (21', 74', 85')	5–2	Millenáris Sporttelep, Budapest	Friendly	7 April 1907	
2	Jenő Károly	Bohemia	3 – (75', 86' (pen.), 87')	5–2	Millenáris Sporttelep, Budapest	Friendly	5 April 1908	
3	Imre Schlosser	Austria	3 – (35', 54' (pen.), 73' (pen.))	4–3	Vienna Cricket and Football-Club, Vienna	Friendly	2 May 1909	
4	Imre Schlosser (2)	France	3 – (10', 30', 49')	3–0	Stade Charentonneau, Maisons-Alfort	Friendly	1 January 1911	
5	Imre Schlosser (3)	Switzerland	6 – (18', 56', 62', 79', 83', 85')	9–0	Millenáris Sporttelep, Budapest	Friendly	29 October 1911	
6	Sándor Bodnár	Germany	3 – (59', 65', 75')	4–4	Millenáris Sporttelep, Budapest	Friendly	14 April 1912	
7	Sándor Bodnár (2)	Norway	3 – (49', 71', 73')	6–0	Kristiania, Oslo	Friendly	23 June 1912	
8	Imre Schlosser (4)	Germany	3 – (4', 40', 82')	3–1	Råsunda IP, Solna	1912 Summer Olympics consolation semi-finals	3 July 1912	
9	Mihály Pataki	Russia	4 – (9', 44', 49', 75' (pen.))	9–0	Sokolniki Pitch, Moscow	Friendly	12 July 1912	
10	Vilmos Kertész	Russia	3 – (47', 54', 84')	9–0	Sokolniki Pitch, Moscow	Friendly	12 July 1912	
11	Imre Schlosser (5)	Russia	5 – (39', 50', 69', 71', 90')	12–0	Sokolniki Pitch, Moscow	Friendly	14 July 1912	
12	Vilmos Kertész (2)	Russia	3 – (17', 36', 64')	12–0	Sokolniki Pitch, Moscow	Friendly	14 July 1912	
13	Sándor Bodnár (3)	France	3 – (20', 81', 87')	5–1	Üllői úti stadion, Budapest	Friendly	31 May 1914	
14	Alfréd Schaffer	Austria	3 – (21', 75', 90')	6–2	Üllői úti stadion, Budapest	Friendly	7 November 1915	
15	Alfréd Schaffer (2)	Austria	3 – (39', 73', 77')	4–1	Prater Sportplatz, Vienna	Friendly	15 July 1917	
16	György Orth	Sweden	3 – (15', 49', 54')	4–2	Üllői úti stadion, Budapest	Friendly	6 November 1921	
17	György Molnár	Italy	3 – (59', 60', 69')	7–1	Üllői úti stadion, Budapest	Friendly	6 April 1924	
18	József Takács	France	6 – (17', 41', 51', 60', 83', 85')	13–1	Üllői úti stadion, Budapest	Friendly	12 June 1927	
19	Vilmos Kohut	Austria	3 – (2', 27', 43')	5–5	Üllői úti stadion, Budapest	Friendly	6 May 1928	
20	István Avar	Netherlands	3 – (40', 44', 69' (pen.))	6–2	Üllői úti stadion, Budapest	Friendly	8 June 1930	
21	József Takács (2)	Germany	3 – (29', 35', 40')	3–5	Heinz-Steyer-Stadion, Dresden	Friendly	28 September 1930	
22	István Avar (2)	Czechoslovakia	3 – (11', 33', 53')	3–3	Stadion Letná, Prague	1931–32 Central European International Cup	22 March 1931	
23	István Avar (3)	Switzerland	3 – (3', 71', 87')	6–2	Hungária körúti stadion, Budapest	1931–32 Central European International Cup	12 April 1931	
24	György Sárosi	Austria	3 – (7', 73', 76')	6–3	Hohe Warte, Budapest	Friendly	12 May 1935	
25	Géza Toldi	Austria	3 – (15', 29', 63')	5–3	Üllői úti stadion, Budapest	1936–38 Central European International Cup	27 September 1936	
26	Gyula Zsengellér	Switzerland	3 – (41', 61', 71')	5–1	Stadion Rankhof, Basel	1936–38 Central European International Cup	11 April 1937	
27	György Sárosi (2)	Switzerland	7 – (34', 51', 60', 62', 77', 80', 85')	8–3	Hungária körúti stadion, Budapest	1936–38 Central European International Cup	19 September 1937	
28	Lajos Szendrődi	Luxembourg	3 – (13', 59', 82')	6–0	Stade Josy Barthel, Luxembourg City	Friendly	16 January 1938	
29	József Nemes	Greece	3 – (36', 40', 51')	11–1	Hungária körúti stadion, Budapest	1938 FIFA World Cup qualification	25 March 1938	
30	Gyula Zsengellér (2)	Greece	5 – (14', 23' (pen.), 24', 81', 83')	11–1	Hungária körúti stadion, Budapest	1938 FIFA World Cup qualification	25 March 1938	
31	Gyula Zsengellér (3)	Germany	3 – (8', 51', 73')	5–1	Hungária körúti stadion, Budapest	Friendly	24 September 1939	
32	Gyula Zsengellér (4)	Bulgaria	4 – (3', 8', 14', 69')	4–2	Yunak Stadium, Sofia	Friendly	6 June 1943	
33	Ferenc Deák	Luxembourg	3 – (15', 60', 85')	7–2	Stade Émile Mayrisch, Esch-sur-Alzette	Friendly	30 October 1946	
34	Ferenc Puskás	Luxembourg	3 – (15', 60', 85')	7–2	Stade Émile Mayrisch, Esch-sur-Alzette		30 October 1946	
35	Nándor Hidegkuti	Bulgaria	3 – (47', 50', 86')	9–0	Üllői úti stadion, Budapest	1947 Balkan Cup	17 August 1947	
36	Ferenc Deák (2)	Bulgaria	4 – (15', 34', 52', 79')	9–0	Üllői úti stadion, Budapest	1947 Balkan Cup	17 August 1947	
37	Ferenc Szusza	Austria	3 – (40', 49', 55')	3–4	Praterstadion, Vienna	Friendly	14 September 1947	
38	Béla Egresi	Romania	3 – (43', 61', 72')	9–0	Megyeri úti Stadion, Budapest	1948 Balkan Cup	6 June 1948	
39	Ferenc Puskás (2)	Romania	3 – (44', 63', 84')	5–1	Stadionul ONEF, Bucharest	1948 Balkan Cup	24 October 1948	
40	Ferenc Puskás (3)	Austria	3 – (32', 82' (pen.), 89')	6–1	Megyeri úti Stadion, Budapest	1948-53 Central European International Cup	8 May 1949	
41	Ferenc Deák (3)	Poland	3 – (14', 51', 62')	8–2	Nagyerdei Stadion, Debrecen	Friendly	10 July 1949	
42	Sándor Kocsis	Sweden	3 – (9', 49', 56')	5–0	Megyeri úti Stadion, Budapest	Friendly	20 November 1949	
43	Gyula Szilágyi	Poland	3 – (38', 48', 62')	5–2	Stadion Wojska Polskiego, Warsaw	Friendly	4 June 1950	
44	Ferenc Puskás (4)	Albania	4 – (18', 36', 75', 82')	12–0	Megyeri úti Stadion, Budapest	Friendly	24 September 1950	
45	László Budai	Albania	4 – (33', 52', 60', 65')	12–0	Megyeri úti Stadion, Budapest	Friendly	24 September 1950	
46	Ferenc Puskás (5)	Austria	3 – (10', 13', 90')	4–3	Megyeri úti Stadion, Budapest	Friendly	29 October 1950	
47	Nándor Hidegkuti (2)	Finland	3 – (9', 28', 85')	8–0	Megyeri úti Stadion, Budapest	Friendly	18 November 1951	
48	Sándor Kocsis (2)	Finland	3 – (49', 80', 84')	6–1	Olympiastadion, Helsinki	Friendly	22 June 1952	
49	Sándor Kocsis (3)	Czechoslovakia	3 – (27', 37', 78')	5–0	Megyeri úti Stadion, Budapest	Friendly	19 October 1952	
50	Nándor Hidegkuti (3)	England	3 – (1', 22', 53')	6–3	Wembley Stadium, London	Friendly	25 November 1953	
51	Sándor Kocsis (4)	South Korea	3 – (24', 36', 50')	9–0	Hardturm, Zürich	1954 FIFA World Cup	17 June 1954	
52	Sándor Kocsis (5)	West Germany	4 – (3', 21', 68', 77')	8–3	St. Jakob-Park, Basel	1954 FIFA World Cup	20 June 1954	
53	Sándor Kocsis (6)	Czechoslovakia	3 – (11', 60', 74')	4–1	Népstadion, Budapest	Friendly	24 October 1954	
54	Sándor Kocsis (7)	Sweden	3 – (16', 29', 81')	7–3	Råsunda Stadium, Solna	Friendly	11 May 1955	
55	Károly Sándor	Denmark	3 – (30', 70', 86')	6–0	Idrætsparken, Copenhagen	Friendly	15 May 1955	
56	Péter Palotás	Finland	3 – (7', 12', 43')	9–1	Olympiastadion, Helsinki	Friendly	19 May 1955	
57	Ferenc Machos	Bulgaria	3 – (5', 14', 30')	4–1	Népstadion, Budapest	1958 FIFA World Cup qualification	23 June 1957	
58	Károly Sándor (2)	Yugoslavia	3 – (15', 71', 79')	4–4	Stadion Maksimir, Zagreb	Friendly	5 October 1958	
59	Flórián Albert	Yugoslavia	3 – (4', 33', 69')	4–2	SK Jugoslavija, Belgrade	Friendly	11 October 1959	
60	Lajos Tichy	Switzerland	4 – (19', 28', 35', 66')	8–0	Népstadion, Budapest	1955–60 Central European International Cup	25 October 1959	
61	Flórián Albert (2)	Bulgaria	3 – (1', 6', 53')	6–1	Estadio Braden Copper Co, Rancagua	1962 FIFA World Cup	3 June 1962	
62	János Farkas	France	3 – (13', 57', 89')	4–2	Népstadion, Budapest	Friendly	28 September 1966	
63	János Farkas (2)	Austria	3 – (8', 74', 85')	3–1	Népstadion, Budapest	Friendly	30 October 1966	
64	János Farkas (3)	East Germany	3 – (9', 48', 50')	3–1	Népstadion, Budapest	UEFA Euro 1968 qualifying	27 September 1967	
65	Tibor Nyilasi	Luxembourg	5 – (21', 32', 44', 57', 67')	8–1	Rohonci út, Szombathely	UEFA Euro 1976 qualifying	19 October 1975	
66	László Kiss	El Salvador	3 – (70', 73', 77')	10–1	Martínez Valero, Elche	1982 FIFA World Cup	15 June 1982	
67	József Póczik	Luxembourg	3 – (31', 59', 71')	6–2	Stade de Luxembourg, Luxembourg City	UEFA Euro 1984 qualifying	27 March 1983	
68	Kálmán Kovács	United Arab Emirates	3 – (37', 67', 83')	3–0	Stade des Costières, Nîmes	Friendly	28 May 1990	
69	József Kiprich	Qatar	3 – (17', 40', 50')	4–1	Stade des Costières, Doha	Friendly	11 October 1992	
70	Vilmos Sebők	Liechtenstein	3 – (33', 41', 85' (pen.))	5–0	Üllői úti stadion, Budapest	UEFA Euro 2000 qualifying	27 March 1999	
71	Miklós Fehér	Lithuania	3 – (36', 62', 72')	5–0	Darius and Girėnas Stadium, Kaunas	2002 FIFA World Cup qualification	11 October 2000	
72	Zoltán Gera	San Marino	3 – (49', 60', 88')	3–0	Megyeri úti Stadion, Budapest	UEFA Euro 2004 qualifying	16 October 2002	
73	Ádám Szalai	San Marino	3 – (18', 27', 48')	8–0	Ferenc Puskás Stadium, Budapest	UEFA Euro 2012 qualifying	8 October 2010	

== Hat-tricks conceded by Hungary ==
No.	Player	Opponent	Goals	Score	Venue	Competition	Date	Ref(s)
1	Jan Studnicka	Austria	3 – (34', ??', ??')	0–5	Wiener A.C. Platz, Vienna	Friendly	12 October 1902	
2	Jan Studnicka (2)	Austria	3 – (24', 57', 72')	2–4	Wiener A.C. Platz, Vienna	Friendly	11 October 1903	
3	Charles Stansfield	Austria	4 – (23', 53', 83', 84')	4–5	Cricket Platz, Vienna	Friendly	9 October 1904	
4	Jan Košek	Bohemia	3 – (15', 35', 86')	3–5	Stadion Slavia, Prague	Friendly	6 October 1907	
5	George Hilsdon	England	4 – (28', 48', 71', 88')	0–7	Millenáris Sporttelep, Budapest	Friendly	10 June 1908	
6	Filip Johansson	Sweden	3 – (3', 27', 50')	2–6	Stockholm Olympic Stadium, Stockholm	Friendly	12 July 1925	
7	Franz Weselik	Austria	3 – (23', 37', 52')	5–5	Hungária körúti stadion, Budapest	Friendly	6 May 1928	
8	Giuseppe Meazza	Italy	3 – (17', 65', 70')	0–5	Stadion Albert Flórián, Budapest	1927–30 Central European International Cup	11 May 1930	
9	Matthias Sindelar	Austria	3 – (3', 13', 31')	2–8	Hohe Warte Stadium, Vienna	Friendly	24 April 1932	
10	Anton Schall	Austria	3 – (33', 50', 70', 73')	2–8	Hohe Warte Stadium, Vienna	Friendly	24 April 1932	
11	Leopold Kielholz	Switzerland	3 – (21', 35', 57')	2–6	Hardturm, Zürich	1933–35 Central European International Cup	14 April 1935	
12	František Kloz	Czechoslovakia	3 – (27', 30', 79', 82')	2–5	Generali Arena, Prague	1936–38 Central European International Cup	18 October 1936	
13	Ted Drake	England	3 – (32', 40', 65')	2–6	Highbury Stadium, London	Friendly	2 December 1936	
14	Ernst Wilimowski	Poland	3 – (33', 62', 75')	2–4	Polish Army Stadium, Warsaw	Friendly	27 August 1939	
15	Daniel Bertoni	Argentina	3 – (11', 18', 44')	1–5	La Bombonera, Buenos Aires	Friendly	27 February 1977	
16	Rupert Marko	Austria	3 – (19', 80', 88')	0–4	Puskás Aréna, Budapest	Friendly	17 May 1988	
17	Kjetil Rekdal	Norway	3 – (83', 89', 90' (pen.))	0–3	Ullevaal Stadion, Oslo	1998 FIFA World Cup qualification	9 October 1996	
18	Predrag Mijatović	FR Yugoslavia	3 – (26', 41', 51')	1–7	Stadion Albert Flórián, Budapest	1998 FIFA World Cup qualification	29 October 1997	
19	Predrag Mijatović (2)	FR Yugoslavia	4 – (44', 45' (pen.), 71', 88')	0–5	Red Star Stadium, Belgrade	1998 FIFA World Cup qualification	15 November 1997	
20	Robin van Persie	Netherlands	3 – (16', 44', 53'	1–8	Amsterdam ArenA, Amsterdam	2014 FIFA World Cup qualification	11 October 2013	

== Statistics ==
The following table lists the number of hat-tricks scored by Hungarian
players who have scored two or more hat-tricks.

Multiple hat-tricks
Rank	Player	Hat-tricks
1	Sándor Kocsis	7
2	Ferenc Puskás	5
2	Imre Schlosser	5
4	Gyula Zsengellér	4
5	Sándor Bodnár	3
5	Ferenc Deák	3
5	István Avar	3
5	János Farkas	3
5	Nándor Hidegkuti	3
11	Flórián Albert	2
11	Alfréd Schaffer	2
11	József Takács	2
11	Károly Sándor	2
11	György Sárosi	2
11	Vilmos Kertész	2

Hat-tricks by competition
Competition	Hat-tricks
Friendlies	47
Balkan Cup	4
Central European Cup	7
UEFA Euro qualifying	6
UEFA Euro	0
Summer Olympics	1
FIFA World Cup qualification	4
FIFA World Cup	4
Total	73

Hat-tricks by opponent
Rank	Opponent	Hat-tricks
1	Austria	10
2	Germany (incl. East and West Germany)	6
3	Bulgaria	5
3	Luxembourg	5
3	Switzerland	5
5	France	4
5	Russia	4
8	Czechoslovakia	3
8	Finland	3
8	Sweden	3
11	Albania	2
11	Bohemia	2
11	Greece	2
11	Poland	2
11	Romania	2
11	San Marino	2
11	Yugoslavia	2
18	Denmark	1
18	El Salvador	1
18	England	1
18	Italy	1
18	Liechtenstein	1
18	Lithuania	1
18	Netherlands	1
18	Norway	1
18	Qatar	1
18	South Korea	1
18	United Arab Emirates	1
Total		73

== See also ==
- Hungary national football team results (2010-19)
