= Hungary–Romania football rivalry =

Association football rivalry

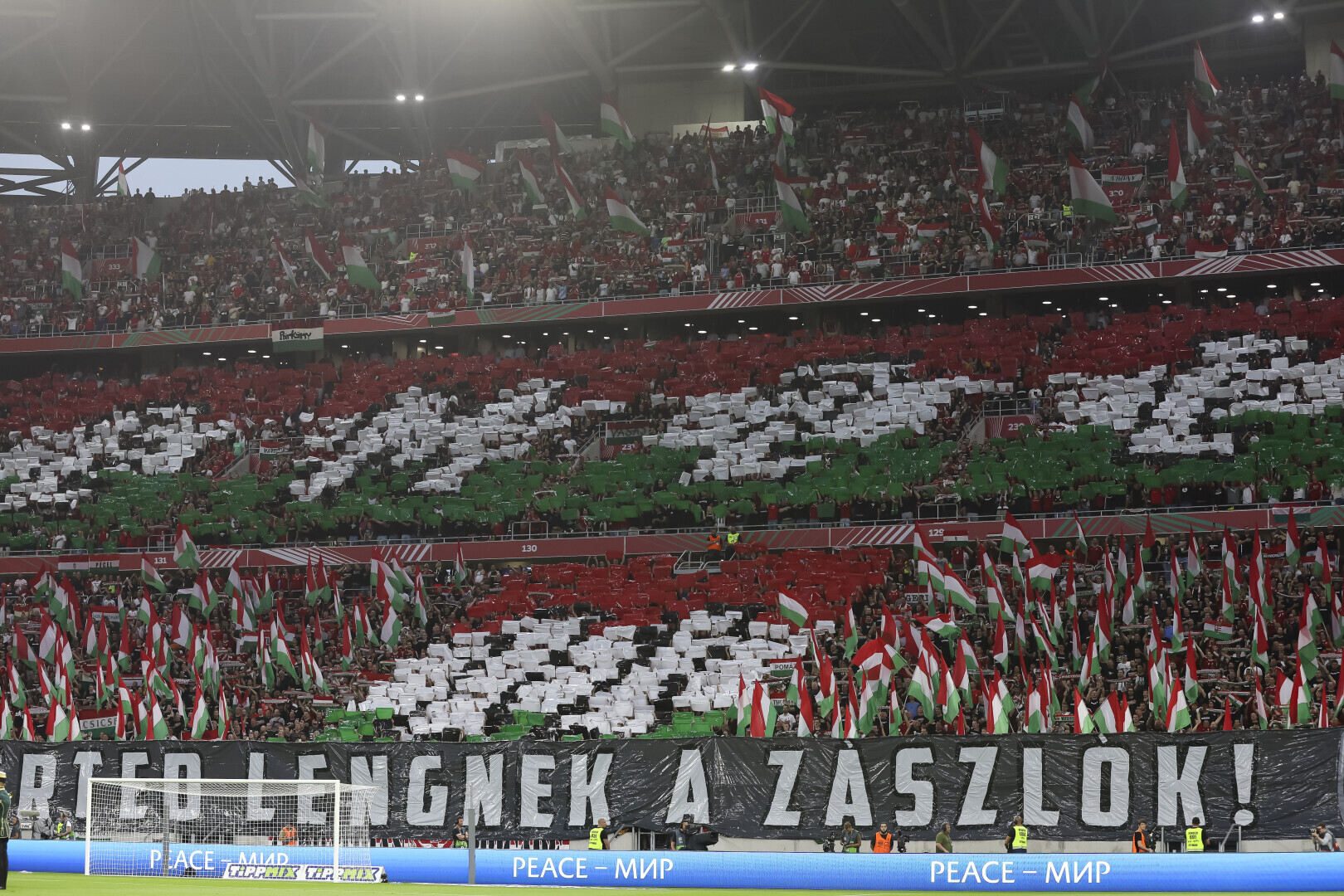
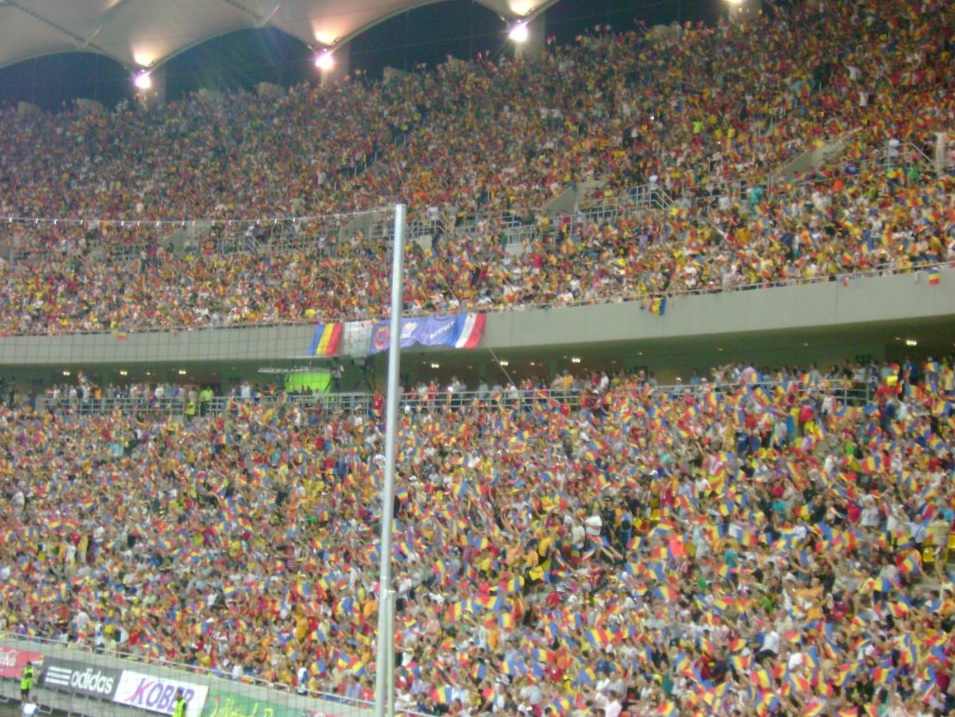
- Hungarian fans (top) and Romanian fans (bottom)
- Location: Europe (UEFA)
- Teams: Hungary; Romania
- First meeting: Romania 1–2 Hungary; Friendly; Bucharest (4 October 1936)
- Latest meeting: Hungary 0–0 Romania; UEFA Euro 2016 qualifying Budapest (4 September 2015)

Statistics
- Total meetings: 25
- Most wins: Hungary (11)
- Largest victory: Hungary 9–0 Romania; Friendly; Budapest (6 Jun 1948)

The Hungary–Romania football rivalry is a competitive sports rivalry that exists between the national football teams of the two countries and their respective sets of fans.

The national teams of Hungary and Romania are longtime rivals, as the two countries are neighbours and had numerous conflicts through history.

The first official match between the two teams dates back to 1936.

Due to the general tension of the matches between the two teams and the numerous fan incidents resulting from the general feeling of antipathy between the two countries, it can be considered one of the most bitter rivalries of the football world.

== Background ==
Hungary

Romania

While the two teams have not met often, the cause of the rivalry is a historic rivalry between the two countries.

After the end of the First World War and the Hungarian–Romanian War, the Treaty of Trianon was signed and Hungary lost Transylvania to Romania, as well as other territories to other neighboring countries. The Second Vienna Award during the Second World War substantially reversed this concession by reassigning Northern Transylvania to Hungary, but the award was nullified by the Allies at the conclusion of the war, and Transylvania has since been governed by Romania.

As a result, there is still a general feeling of antipathy between both countries today, and they often use sports to fuel it, football matches being the most important as football is the most popular sport in the two countries. While this also happens in other sports too, apart from football (for example basketball, handball, polo, volleyball, etc.), it is the football rivalry that gained most attention so far.

== Incidents ==
On 22 March 2013, during the FIFA World Cup 2014 qualification – UEFA Group D, around 5,000 Hungarian fans clashed with the Hungarian police after the game – the match was held with no spectators according to the former decision of FIFA because of the incidents of the Hungary–Israel friendly – at the Ferenc Puskás Stadium between the two teams finished 2–2.

Days before a 6 September 2013 match at the Arena Națională between the two teams, during the FIFA World Cup 2014 qualification – UEFA Group D, the Hungarian fans chanted xenophobic chants aimed at Romania at matches in the Hungarian League and posted messages aiming at violence towards Romanians in online forums. Hours before the game, hundreds of Hungarian hooligans attempted devastating the Bucharest Old Town and starting fights with the Romanian police, who promptly stopped them using tear gas and brute force. On 6 September 2013, during FIFA World Cup 2014 qualification – UEFA Group D in the Arena Națională, Romanian fans booed the Hungarian anthem and lit flares in some areas of the auditorium. After Hungary lost the match 0–3, Hungarian fans were quickly transported back home to prevent any conflict, but Hungarian fans clashed with both Romanian fans and police forces, angered by their team's crushing defeat against their biggest rivals.

For this group, Netherlands qualified directly for the 2014 FIFA World Cup with 28 points, Romania finished as second with 19 points and qualified for the play-offs, Hungary finished as third with 17 points, Turkey finished as fourth with 16 points, Estonia finished as fifth with 7 points, and Andorra finished last with no points and no goals. For the play-off matches, Romania needed to beat Greece. Greece won the first match in Athens with 3–1 and the match in Bucharest ended with a 1–1 draw among both teams, so Greece won 4–2, qualified for the tournament and meanwhile Romania eliminated from the World Cup. After the Greek win against Romania, many Hungarians celebrated it in social media and in Budapest too, because their biggest opponent got eliminated from the World Cup. They congratulated Greece and Greeks for this and meanwhile, they started to insult Romania. Furthermore, the Greeks and many Hungarians, criticized the Romanian fans' behaviour against Greek National Anthem, in Bucharest, when the Romanian fans booed the Greek Anthem.

On 11 October 2014, during the UEFA Euro 2016 qualifying Group F match between Romania and Hungary at the Arena Națională, illicit banners and crowd disturbances were detected by the UEFA. A part of the Hungarian fans went in Romania for the game with shirts showing the message "Hungary on Tour - Gypsyland II, Bucharest 2014.10.11.", as they exactly did in September 2013. After the Hungarian anthem was whistled by the Romanian fans, during the intonatation of the Romanian anthem, the Hungarian fans turned on their backs and showed obscene gestures. According to Gazeta Sporturilor, Romanian ultras were let to the Stadium without properly being searched and, before the match between Hungary and Romania, threw firecrackers, lighters and steam grenades at the Hungarian fans, who responded by throwing broken chairs at the Romanian ultras. After the anthems were played, Hungarian fans broke the barriers that held their sector in the stadium closed and attempted to start a fight with the Romanian fans. The security guards (employees of the BGS Security Division) brutally tried to make order in the Romanian sector and many spectators, including some innocent ones, were injured. In response, the Romanian ultras threw two security guards through a fence. According to Adevărul, the events were not far away from a cancellation of the match, that would have resulted in a 0–3 score for Hungary, because the Romanian fans used pyrotechnical tools in a huge amount. As a result of the continuous explosions of steam petards, the situation was compared with the one at the Gaza Strip. Finally, the Romanian Football Federation (FRF) apologized in front of the Romanian fans because of the actions of the security guards. Despite the FRF's earlier notifications, the Romanian fans made xenophobic chants like "Afară, afară cu ungurii din țară". In return, the Hungarian fans chanted "cigányok, cigányok".

During another game, Hungarian forward Ádám Szalai had a goal disallowed for offside six minutes before the break, causing Hungarian fans to set several seats on fire. The final result was 1–1, but the match was simply a side-note to the brutal violence both on and off the pitch. Scottish referee William Collum was forced to dish out 12 yellow cards during the match, while police sprayed tear gas at fans in the stands. Both sets of supporters created a deafening roar throughout the game, letting off flares and firecrackers, to the dismay of onlooking police. The UEFA started an investigation and at the end, both countries' football federations were punished.

One week before a 4 September 2015 game between the two teams, the Hungarian Football Federation fined 6 first league Hungarian clubs a total of over 3 million forints for xenophobic insults by their fans directed at Romania. These incidents occurred during the first league matches Diósgyőr–Újpest 2–1, Honvéd–Puskás Akadémia 0–0, Vasas–MTK 0–1 and Videoton–Debrecen 1–0, the fined clubs were Újpest, Honvéd, Videoton, Debrecen, MTK and Diósgyőr.

On 3 September 2015, one day before an UEFA Euro 2016 qualifying Group F match, Hungarian football hooligans clashed with the Hungarian police in the streets of Budapest, 16 of them being arrested. Furthermore, the hotel which was hosting the Romanian team was assaulted by Hungarian hooligans. Hours before the game, Hungarian fans attempted fights against the Romanian fans in the Romanian fanzone by throwing firecrackers and flares at them, but the Hungarian police forced stopped the two groups of fans from clashing. Also before the game, a small group of Romanian fans supporting rival Romanian teams (Steaua Bucharest and Dinamo Bucharest) started to insult and beat each other in one of the stands. The Steaua fans responsible for the altercation (there was already tension between the Dinamo and Steaua fans due to Steaua fans deciding to wear their SUD Steaua shirts at the game instead of Romania shirts like the other over 1000 Romanian fans, the altercation started when Steaua fans misheard Dinamo fans' "Trianon" chant directed at the Hungarian fans as "Dinamo" and tried attacking them) were escorted out of the arena. In return, the Hungarian fans chanted "cigányok" at the Romanian fans. The Romanian fans responded by chanting "bozgorii" at the Hungarian fans for much of the match. A few days before the match, there was a campaign by a section of Hungarians to show superiority during the rejection of the Romanian National Anthem, which was named "Ne fütyüld ki a román himnuszt!" (Which means: Do not whistle the Romanian Anthem!). However this did not happen. During the game, Hungarian fans booed Romania's national anthem with turning on their backs, showing obscene gestures, whistling all the time and lit flares and torches inside the stadium. They also chanted xenophobic chants such as "cigányok" at the Romanian team and its fans for the remainder of the game, which finished 0–0. After when the Romania's national anthem was booed by the Hungarian fans, during the intonatation of the Hungarian anthem, the Romanian fans turned on their backs, showed obscene gestures and shouted disgusting slogans against Hungary.

For this group, Northern Ireland finished as first with 21 points and qualified directly for the UEFA Euro 2016, Romania finished as second with 20 points and qualified directly for the UEFA Euro 2016, Hungary finished as third with 16 points and qualified for the play-offs, Finland finished as fourth with 12 points, Faroe Islands finished as fifth with 6 points (2 wins against Greece) and Greece finished as sixth with 6 points too, but due to the two Faroese wins against Greece, Faroe Islands finished as fifth and Greece as sixth and last. For the play-off matches, Hungary needed to beat Norway. Hungary won the first match in Oslo with 1–0 and the match in Budapest with 2–1, so Hungary won 3–1 and qualified for the tournament.

== Matches ==
4 October 1936
14:30
Friendly match

Romania	1–2	Hungary
Bindea 22'	Report	Lázár 65'; Toldi 83'

Stadionul ONEF, Bucharest, Romania
Attendance: 35,000
Referee: John Langenus (Belgium)

22 October 1939
15:30
Friendly match

Romania	1–1	Hungary
Spielmann 78'	Report	Tóth 76'

Stadionul ONEF, Bucharest, Romania
Attendance: 25,000
Referee: Generoso Dattilo (Italy)

19 May 1940
17:15
Friendly match

Hungary	2–0	Romania
Sárosi 73'; Gyetvai 75'	Report

Üllői úti stadion, Budapest, Hungary
Attendance: 20,000
Referee: Mika Popović (Yugoslavia)

30 September 1945
15:45
Friendly match

Hungary	7–2	Romania
Hidegkuti 8', 86'; Puskás 15', 66'; Zsengellér 25'; Rudas 32'; Nyers 39'	Report	Fabian 17'; Pecsovszky 43'

Üllői úti stadion, Budapest, Hungary
Attendance: 35,000
Referee: Pál Hertzka (Hungary)

12 October 1947
15:00
Friendly match

Romania	0–3	Hungary
	Report	Egresi 21'; Puskás 35', 74'

Stadionul CFR, Bucharest, Romania
Attendance: 25,000
Referee: Milenko Podubski (Yugoslavia)

6 June 1948
Friendly match

Hungary	9–0	Romania
Mészáros 30', 46'; Egresi 43', 60', 71'; Puskás 57', 87'; Kocsis 66', 84'	Report

Megyeri úti stadion, Budapest, Hungary
Attendance: 45,000
Referee: P. Mlinarić (Yugoslavia)

24 October 1948
14:15
Friendly match

Romania	1–5	Hungary
Pecsovszky 77'	Report	Puskás 44', 63', 84'; Deák 50', 68'

Stadionul Republicii, Bucharest, Romania
Attendance: 40,000
Referee: Vlček Jaroslav (Czechoslovakia)

15 July 1952
18:00
1952 Summer Olympics

Romania	1–2	Hungary
Suru 86'	Report	Czibor 22'; Kocsis 73'

Kupittaa, Turku, Finland
Attendance: 14,000
Referee: Nikolay Latyshev (Soviet Union)

19 September 1954
16:30
Friendly match

Hungary	5–1	Romania
Kocsis 20', 35'; Hidegkuti 44', 53'; Budai 68'	Report	Ozon 24'

Népstadion, Budapest, Hungary
Attendance: 93,000
Referee: Metoděj Charousek (Czechoslovakia)

26 October 1958
14:00
Friendly match

Romania	1–2	Hungary
Dinulescu 30'	Report	Vasas 72'; Tichy 78'

Stadionul 23. August, Bucharest, Romania
Attendance: 90,000
Referee: Elmar Saar (Soviet Union)

29 April 1972
17:00
First Leg
UEFA Euro 1972 quarter-finals

Hungary	1–1	Romania
Branikovits 11'	Report	Sătmăreanu 56'

Népstadion, Budapest, Hungary
Attendance: 70,000
Referee: David William Smith (England)
14 May 1972
17:00
Second Leg
UEFA Euro 1972 quarter-finals

Romania	2–2	Hungary
Dobrin 14'; Neagu 81'	Report	Szőke 5'; Kocsis 36'

Stadionul 23. August, Bucharest, Romania
Attendance: 60,300
Referee: Kurt Tschenscher (West Germany)
17 May 1972
20:00
Replay
UEFA Euro 1972 Quarter Finals

Hungary	2–1	Romania
Kocsis 26'; Szőke 89'	Report	Neagu 32'

Stadion JNA, Belgrade, Yugoslavia
Attendance: 32,130
Referee: Christos Michas (Greece)

Hungary won 5–4 on aggregate (After Replay; After Second Leg: 3–3)

13 May 1981
1982 FIFA World Cup qualification

Hungary	1–0	Romania
Fazekas 18'	Report

Népstadion, Budapest, Hungary
Attendance: 68,000
Referee: Alexis Ponnet (Belgium)
23 September 1981
1982 FIFA World Cup qualification

Romania	0–0	Hungary
	Report

Stadionul 23. August, Bucharest, Romania
Attendance: 70,000
Referee: Erich Linemayr (Austria)

14 October 1998
UEFA Euro 2000 Q

Hungary	1–1	Romania
Hrutka 82'	Report	Moldovan 50'

Nepstadion, Budapest, Hungary
Attendance: 30,000
Referee: Kim Milton Nielsen (DEN)
5 June 1999
UEFA Euro 2000 Q

Romania	2–0	Hungary
Ilie 2'; Munteanu 15'	Report

Stadionul Steaua, Bucharest, Romania
Attendance: 25,000
Referee: Rune Pedersen (NOR)

2 June 2001
2002 FIFA World Cup qualification

Romania	2–0	Hungary
M. Niculae 5', 54'	Report

Stadionul Steaua, Bucharest, Romania
Attendance: 22,000
Referee: Eric Poulat (France)
5 September 2001
2002 FIFA World Cup qualification

Hungary	0–2	Romania
	Report	A. Ilie 11'; M. Niculae 27'

Népstadion, Budapest, Hungary
Attendance: 10,000
Referee: Hugh Dallas (Scotland)

21 February 2004
Friendly match

Hungary	0–3	Romania
	Report	Mihuț 11'; Dănciulescu 89'; Caramarin 90+2'

GSP Stadium, Nicosia, Cyprus
Attendance: 1,200
Referee: Kapitanis (Cyprus)

12 August 2009
20:00
Friendly match

Hungary	0–1	Romania
	Report	Ghioane 42'

Népstadion, Budapest, Hungary
Attendance: 20,000
Referee: Vladimir Vnuk (Slovakia)

22 March 2013
20:30 GMT
FIFA World Cup qualification

Hungary	2–2	Romania
Vanczák 16'; Dzsudzsák 71' (pen.)	Report	Mutu 68' (pen.); Chipciu 90+2'

Ferenc Puskás Stadium, Budapest, Hungary
Attendance: 0
Referee: Wolfgang Stark (Germany)
6 September 2013
21:00 GMT
FIFA World Cup qualification

Romania	3–0	Hungary
Marica 3'; Pintilii 38'; Tănase 87'	Report

Arena Națională, Bucharest, Romania
Attendance: 41,405
Referee: Alberto Undiano Mallenco (Spain)

11 October 2014
18:00 (UTC+2)
UEFA Euro 2016 qualifying

Romania	1–1	Hungary
Rusescu 45'	Report	Dzsudzsák 82'

Arena Națională, Bucharest, Romania
Attendance: 50,000
Referee: William Collum (Scotland)
4 September 2015
20:45 (UTC+1)
UEFA Euro 2016 qualifying

Hungary	0–0	Romania
	Report

Groupama Arena, Budapest, Hungary
Attendance: 22,060
Referee: Felix Brych (Germany)

== Stadia ==
As of 1 September 2019

No	Stadium	Venue	Matches	Hungary wins	Draws	Romania wins
1.	Ferenc Puskás Stadium	Hungary, Budapest	7	2	3	2
2.	Stadionul 23. August	Romania, Bucharest	3	1	2	0
3.	Stadionul Republicii	Romania, Bucharest	3	2	1	0
4.	Üllői úti stadion	Hungary, Budapest	2	2	0	0
5.	Arena Națională	Romania, Bucharest	2	0	1	1
6.	Stadionul Ghencea	Romania, Bucharest	2	0	0	2
7.	Partizan Stadium	(Socialist Federal Republic of Yugoslavia) Yugoslavia, Belgrade	1	1	0	0
8.	Megyeri úti Stadium	Hungary, Budapest	1	1	0	0
9.	Stadionul CFR	Romania, Timișoara	1	1	0	0
10.	GSP Stadium	Cyprus, Nicosia	1	0	0	1
11.	Veritas Stadion	Finland, Turku	1	1	0	0
12.	Groupama Arena	Hungary, Budapest	1	0	1	0

== Statistics ==
As of 14 June 2016

Competition	Hungary wins	Draws	Romania wins
Total	11	8	6

== Top scorers ==
=== Hungary ===
- (Hungary) Ferenc Puskás (9 goals)
- (Hungary) Sándor Kocsis (5 goals)
- (Hungary) Béla Egresi (4 goals)
- (Hungary) Nándor Hidegkuti (4 goals)
- (Hungary) Ferenc Deák (2 goals)
- (Hungary) Balázs Dzsudzsák (2 goals)
- (Hungary) Lajos Kocsis (2 goals)
- (Hungary) József Mészáros (2 goals)
- (Hungary) István Szőke (2 goals)
- (Hungary) László Branikovits (1 goal)
- (Hungary) László Budai (1 goal)
- (Hungary) Zoltán Czibor (1 goal)
- (Hungary) László Fazekas (1 goal)
- (Hungary) László Gyetvai (1 goal)
- (Hungary) János Hrutka (1 goal)
- (Hungary) Gyula Lázár (1 goal)
- (Hungary) István Nyers (1 goal)
- (Hungary) Ferenc Rudas (1 goal)
- (Hungary) György Sárosi (1 goal)
- (Hungary) Lajos Tichy (1 goal)
- (Hungary) Géza Toldi (1 goal)
- (Hungary) Mátyás Tóth (1 goal)
- (Hungary) Vilmos Vanczák (1 goal)
- (Hungary) Mihály Vasas (1 goal)
- (Hungary) Gyula Zsengellér (1 goal)

=== Romania ===
- (Romania) Marius Niculae (3 goals)
- (Romania) Adrian Ilie (2 goals)
- (Romania) Alexandru Neagu (2 goals)
- (Romania) Iosif Petschovschi (2 goals)
- (Romania) Silviu Bindea (1 goal)
- (Romania) Gabriel Caramarin (1 goal)
- (Romania) Alexandru Chipciu (1 goal)
- (Romania) Ionel Dănciulescu (1 goal)
- (Romania) Constantin Dinulescu (1 goal)
- (Romania) Nicolae Dobrin (1 goal)
- (Romania) Francisc Fabian (1 goal)
- (Romania) Tiberiu Ghioane (1 goal)
- (Romania) Ciprian Marica (1 goal)
- (Romania) Dorin Mihuţ (1 goal)
- (Romania) Viorel Moldovan (1 goal)
- (Romania) Dorinel Munteanu (1 goal)
- (Romania) Adrian Mutu (1 goal)
- (Romania) Titus Ozon (1 goal)
- (Romania) Mihai Pintilii (1 goal)
- (Romania) Raul Rusescu (1 goal)
- (Romania) Francisc Spielmann (1 goal)
- (Romania) Ion Suru (1 goal)
- (Romania) Lajos Sătmăreanu (1 goal)
- (Romania) Cristian Tănase (1 goal)

- Active players in bold

== See also ==
- Austria–Hungary football rivalry
- Hungary–Romania relations
- Hungarians in Romania
- Romanians in Hungary
