= 1936–1938 Central European International Cup =

1936–38 Central European International Cup
Tournament details
- Dates: 22 March 1936 – 3 April 1938
- Teams: 5

Tournament statistics
- Matches played: 17
- Goals scored: 78 (4.59 per match)
- Top goal scorer: (Hungary) György Sárosi (10 goals)

The 1936–38 Central European International Cup was the fourth edition of the Central European International Cup played between 1936 and 1938. It was played in a round robin tournament between five teams involved in the tournament. This edition of the tournament was interrupted due to the annexation of Austria to Nazi Germany on 12 March 1938.

== Final standings ==
| Pos | Team | Pld | W | D | L | GF | GA | GD | Pts | HUN | ITA | TCH | AUT | SUI |
|---|---|---|---|---|---|---|---|---|---|---|---|---|---|---|
| 1 | Hungary | 7 | 5 | 0 | 2 | 24 | 15 | +9 | 10 | — | np. | 8–3 | 5–3 | 2–0 |
| 2 | Italy | 4 | 3 | 1 | 0 | 9 | 4 | +5 | 7 | 2–0 | — | np. | np. | 4–2 |
| 3 | Czechoslovakia (E) | 7 | 3 | 1 | 3 | 16 | 20 | −4 | 7 | 5–2 | 0–1 | — | 2–1 | 5–3 |
| 4 | Austria (E) | 6 | 2 | 1 | 3 | 13 | 14 | −1 | 5 | 1–2 | abd. | 1–1 | — | 4–3 |
| 5 | Switzerland (E) | 8 | 1 | 1 | 6 | 16 | 25 | −9 | 3 | 1–5 | 2–2 | 4–0 | 1–3 | — |

Source: RSSSF
(E) Eliminated

== Matches ==
22 March 1936

| Austria | 1–1 | Czechoslovakia |
|---|---|---|
| Bican 73' (pen.) | Report | Zajíček 59' |

Praterstadion, Vienna, Austria
Attendance: 53,000
Referee: Francesco Mattea (Italy)

27 September 1936
16:00 (+1:00)

| Hungary | 5–3 | Austria |
|---|---|---|
| Toldi 15', 29', 63'; Cseh 40'; Titkos 72' | Report | Binder 2'; Sindelar 27', 64' |

Üllői úti stadion, Budapest, Hungary
Attendance: 25,000
Referee: Lucien Leclerq (France)

18 October 1936
13:00 (UTC+1:00)

| Czechoslovakia | 5–2 | Hungary |
|---|---|---|
| Kloz 27', 30', 79', 82'; Kopecký 87' | Report | Titkos 7'; Toldi 33' |

Generali Arena, Prague, Czechoslovakia
Attendance: 22,000
Referee: Walter Lewington (England)

25 October 1936
15:00 CET (UTC+01:00)

| Italy | 4–2 | Switzerland |
|---|---|---|
| Meazza 26'; Piola 37', 53'; Pasinati 60' | Report | Bickel 31'; Diebold 76' |

San Siro, Milan, Italy
Attendance: 40,000
Referee: Peco Bauwens (Germany)

8 November 1936
15:00 (+1:00)

| Switzerland | 1–3 | Austria |
|---|---|---|
| Sesta 90' (o.g.) | Report | Binder 26', 80'; Hahnemann 71' |

Letzigrund, Zürich, Switzerland
Attendance: 22,000
Referee: Karl Weingartner (Germany)

21 February 1937
15:00 (+1:00)

| Czechoslovakia | 5–3 | Switzerland |
|---|---|---|
| Kopecký 15', 43'; Svoboda 44'; Horák 50'; Puč 76' | Report | Wagner 18' (pen.); Bickel 55', 84' |

Letenský Stadion, Prague, Czechoslovakia
Attendance: 20,000
Referee: Lucien Leclercq (France)

21 March 1937
15:30 (+1:00)

| Austria | 2–0 abandoned after 73' | Italy |
|---|---|---|
| Jerusalem 40'; Stroh 63' (pen.) | Report |

Praterstadion, Vienna, Austria
Attendance: 52,000
Referee: Carl Olsson (Sweden)

11 April 1937
15:00 (UTC+1:00) CET (UTC+01:00)

| Switzerland | 1–5 | Hungary |
|---|---|---|
| G. Aeby 58' | Report | Sárosi 26'; Zsengellér 41', 61', 71'; Dudás 77' |

Stadion Rankhof, Basel, Switzerland
Attendance: 16,000
Referee: John Langenus (Belgium)

25 April 1937
15:00 CET (UTC+01:00)

| Italy | 2–0 | Hungary |
|---|---|---|
| Colaussi 33'; Frossi 81' | Report |

Stadio Municipale Benito Mussolini, Turin, Italy
Attendance: 28,000
Referee: William Bangerter (Switzerland)

23 May 1937
16:00 CET (UTC+01:00)

| Czechoslovakia | 0–1 | Italy |
|---|---|---|
| | Report | Piola 24' |

Generali Arena, Prague, Czechoslovakia
Attendance: 30,000
Referee: Peco Bauwens (Germany)

19 September 1937
16:00 (+1:00)

| Hungary | 8–3 | Czechoslovakia |
|---|---|---|
| Zsengellér 15'; Sárosi 34', 51', 60', 62', 77', 80', 85' | Report | Riha 21'; Rulc 26'; Nejedlý 65' |

Hungaria uti, Budapest, Hungary
Attendance: 27,000
Referee: Peco Bauwens (Germany)

19 September 1937
16:00 (+1:00)

| Austria | 4–3 | Switzerland |
|---|---|---|
| Sindelar 2'; Jerusalem 8', 28'; Geiter 39' | Report | Walaschek 36'; P. Aeby 41'; G. Aeby 77' |

Praterstadion, Vienna, Austria
Attendance: 33,000
Referee: Mika Popović (Yugoslavia)

10 October 1937
15:30 (+1:00)

| Austria | 1–2 | Hungary |
|---|---|---|
| Stroh 76' | Report | Sárosi 21'; Cseh 78' |

Praterstadion, Vienna, Austria
Attendance: 44,000
Referee: Charles Argent (England)

24 October 1937
15:00 (+1:00)

| Czechoslovakia | 2–1 | Austria |
|---|---|---|
| Říha 75'; Kloz 76' | Report | Neumer 18' |

Letenský stadion, Prague, Czechoslovakia
Attendance: 35,000
Referee: Pál Hertzka (Hungary)

31 October 1937
15:00 CET (UTC+01:00)

| Switzerland | 2–2 | Italy |
|---|---|---|
| Walaschek 17' (pen.); Wagner 23' | Report | Piola 15', 85' |

Charmilles Stadium, Geneva, Switzerland
Attendance: 25,000
Referee: Walter Lewington (England)

14 November 1937
14:00 (+1:00)

| Hungary | 2–0 | Switzerland |
|---|---|---|
| Sárosi 3'; Toldi 74' | Report |

Üllői úti stadion, Budapest, Hungary
Attendance: 12,000
Referee: Mika Popovic (Yugoslavia)

3 April 1938
15:00 (+1:00)

| Switzerland | 4–0 | Czechoslovakia |
|---|---|---|
| Monnard 28'; Grassi 30'; G. Aeby 39'; Amadò 80' | Report |

Stadion Rankhof, Basel, Switzerland
Attendance: 20,000
Referee: Reginald Rudd (England)

=== Unplayed games ===
- Hungary–Italy
- Italy–Czechoslovakia
- Italy–Austria
- Austria–Italy (refixture)

== Winner ==
The competition was unfinished; either Hungary or Italy would have won it.

== Statistics ==
=== Goalscorers ===
There were 78 goals scored in 17 matches, for an average of 4.59 goals per match.

10 goals

- (Hungary) György Sárosi

5 goals

- (Czechoslovakia) František Kloz
- (Italy) Silvio Piola
- (Hungary) Géza Toldi

4 goals

- (Hungary) Gyula Zsengellér

3 goals

- (Austria) Matthias Sindelar
- (Austria) Franz Binder
- (Switzerland) Georges Aeby
- (Switzerland) Alfred Bickel
- (Czechoslovakia) Vlastimil Kopecký

2 goals

- (Austria) Camillo Jerusalem
- (Hungary) László Cseh
- (Hungary) Pál Titkos
- (Switzerland) Eugen Walaschek
- (Switzerland) Fritz Wagner
- (Czechoslovakia) Jan Říha

1 goal

- (Austria) Josef Bican
- (Austria) Josef Stroh
- (Austria) Leopold Neumer
- (Austria) Rudolf Geiter
- (Austria) Wilhelm Hahnemann
- (Hungary) János Dudás
- (Italy) Annibale Frossi
- (Italy) Gino Colaussi
- (Italy) Giuseppe Meazza
- (Italy) Piero Pasinati
- (Switzerland) Eugen Diebold
- (Switzerland) Paul Aeby
- (Switzerland) Lauro Amadò
- (Switzerland) Numa Monnard
- (Switzerland) Tullio Grassi
- (Czechoslovakia) František Svoboda
- (Czechoslovakia) Oldřich Zajíček
- (Czechoslovakia) Antonín Puč
- (Czechoslovakia) Václav Horák
- (Czechoslovakia) Oldřich Rulc
- (Czechoslovakia) Oldřich Nejedlý

1 own goal

- (Austria) Karl Sesta (against Switzerland)

== See also ==
Balkan Cup
Baltic Cup
Nordic Cup
Mediterranean Cup
