= 1935 Mitropa Cup =

Tournament details
- Dates: 15 June – 15 September 1935
- Teams: 16

Final positions
- Champions: (Czechoslovakia) Sparta Prague (2nd title)
- Runners-up: (Hungary) Ferencváros

Tournament statistics
- Matches played: 31
- Top scorer: (Hungary) György Sárosi (9 goals)

The 1935 season of the Mitropa Cup football club tournament was won by Sparta Prague who defeated Ferencváros 4–2 on aggregate in the final. It was Sparta's second victory in the competition, having won the inaugural competition in 1927. The two legs of the final were played on 8 September and 15 September.

This was the ninth edition of the tournament. Holders AGC Bologna failed to qualify for the competition.

== First round ==
| Team 1 | Agg. | Team 2 | 1st leg | 2nd leg |
|---|---|---|---|---|
| Admira Wien (Austria) | 4–9 | (Hungary) Hungária MTK | 3–2 | 1–7 |
| Viktoria Plzeň (Czechoslovakia) | 4–8 | (Italy) Juventus | 3–3 | 1–5 |
| First Vienna (Austria) | 4–6 | (Czechoslovakia) Sparta Prague | 1–1 | 3–5 |
| Újpest (Hungary) | 3–6 | (Italy) Fiorentina | 0–2 | 3–4 |
| Židenice (Czechoslovakia) | 5–4 | (Austria) Rapid Wien | 3–2 | 2–2 |
| Roma (Italy) | 3–9 | (Hungary) Ferencváros | 3–1 | 0–8 |
| Szegedi (Hungary) | 1–5 | (Czechoslovakia) Slavia Prague | 1–4 | 0–1 |
| Ambrosiana Inter (Italy) | 3–8 | Austria Wien | 2–5 | 1–3 |

== Quarterfinals ==
| Team 1 | Agg. | Team 2 | 1st leg | 2nd leg |
|---|---|---|---|---|
| Hungária MTK (Hungary) | 2–4 | (Italy) Juventus | 1–3 | 1–1 |
| Sparta Prague (Czechoslovakia) | 8–4 | (Italy) Fiorentina | 7–1 | 1–3 |
| Židenice (Czechoslovakia) | 5–8 | (Hungary) Ferencváros | 4–2 | 1–6 |
| Slavia Prague (Czechoslovakia) | 2–2^{a} | Austria Wien | 1–0 | 1–2 |

- ^{a} Match decided by play off.

=== Quarterfinal play off ===
| Team 1 | Score | Team 2 |
|---|---|---|
| Austria Wien | 5–2 | (Czechoslovakia) Slavia Prague |

== Semifinals ==
| Team 1 | Agg. | Team 2 | 1st leg | 2nd leg |
|---|---|---|---|---|
| Ferencváros (Hungary) | 6–5 | Austria Wien | 4–2 | 2–3 |
| Sparta Prague (Czechoslovakia) | 3–3^{a} | (Italy) Juventus | 2–0 | 1–3 |

- ^{a} Match decided by play off.

=== Semifinal play-off ===
| Team 1 | Score | Team 2 |
|---|---|---|
| Sparta Prague (Czechoslovakia) | 5–1 | (Italy) Juventus |

== Finals ==
| Team 1 | Agg. | Team 2 | 1st leg | 2nd leg |
|---|---|---|---|---|
| Ferencváros (Hungary) | 2–4 | (Czechoslovakia) Sparta Prague | 2–1 | 0–3 |

8 September 1935

| Ferencváros (Hungary) | 2–1 | (Czechoslovakia) Sparta Prague |
|---|---|---|
| Toldi 16'; Kiss 27' | | Braine 71' |

Üllői úti, Budapest
Attendance: 34,000
Referee: William Walden (England)

15 September 1935

| Sparta Prague (Czechoslovakia) | 3–0 | (Hungary) Ferencváros |
|---|---|---|
| Facsinek 26'; Braine 34', 69' |

Masaryk-Stadion, Prague
Attendance: 56,000
Referee: Albert Fogg (England)

1935 Mitropa Cup Champions

Sparta Prague
2nd Title

== Top goalscorers ==
| Rank | Player | Team | Goals |
|---|---|---|---|
| 1 | (Hungary) György Sárosi | (Hungary) Ferencváros | 9 |
| 2 | (Austria) Matthias Sindelar | Austria Wien | 8 |
| 3 | (Czechoslovakia) Oldřich Zajíček | (Czechoslovakia) Sparta Prague | 7 |
| 3 | (Belgium) Raymond Braine | (Czechoslovakia) Sparta Prague | 7 |
