= Hungary national football team results (2010–2019) =

This article provides details of international football games played by the Hungary national football team from 2010 to 2019.

== Results ==
Key
Win
Draw
Defeat

=== 2010 ===
3 March 2010 Friendly	Hungary	1–1	Russia	Győr, Hungary
19:30 UTC+1	Vanczák 39'	Report	Bilyaletdinov 59'	Stadium: ETO Park; Attendance: 10,423; Referee: Ante Vučemilović-Šimunović (Croatia)

29 May 2010 Friendly	Hungary	0–3	Germany	Budapest, Hungary
20:00 UTC+2		Report	Podolski 5' (pen.); Gómez 69'; Cacau 72'	Stadium: Ferenc Puskás Stadium; Attendance: 13,000; Referee: Claus Bo Larsen (Denmark)

5 June 2010 Friendly	Netherlands	6–1	Hungary	Amsterdam, Netherlands
14:00 UTC+2	van Persie 21'; Sneijder 56'; Robben 64', 78'; van Bommel 71'; Elia 74'		Dzsudzsák 6'	Stadium: Amsterdam ArenA; Attendance: 45,000; Referee: Florian Meyer (Germany)

11 August 2010 Friendly	England	2–1	Hungary	London, England
20:00 UTC+1	Gerrard 69', 73'	Report	Jagielka 62' (o.g.)	Stadium: Wembley Stadium; Attendance: 72,024; Referee: Stéphane Lannoy (France)

3 September 2010 UEFA Euro 2012 qualifying	Sweden	2–0	Hungary	Solna, Sweden
20:00 UTC+2	Wernbloom 51', 73'	Report		Stadium: Råsunda Stadium; Attendance: 32,304; Referee: Martin Atkinson (England)

7 September 2010 UEFA Euro 2012 qualifying	Hungary	2–1	Moldova	Budapest, Hungary
20:30 UTC+2	Rudolf 50'; Koman 66'	Report	Suvorov 79'	Stadium: Szusza Ferenc Stadion; Attendance: 9,209; Referee: Libor Kovařík (Czech Republic)

8 October 2010 UEFA Euro 2012 qualifying	Hungary	8–0	San Marino	Budapest, Hungary
19:00 UTC+2	Rudolf 11', 25'; Szalai 18', 27', 48'; Koman 60'; Dzsudzsák 89'; Gera 90+4' (pen.)	Report		Stadium: Stadium Puskás Ferenc; Attendance: 10,596; Referee: Hannes Kaasik (Estonia)

12 October 2010 UEFA Euro 2012 qualifying	Finland	1–2	Hungary	Helsinki, Finland
18:30 UTC+3	Forssell 86'	Report	Szalai 50'; Dzsudzsák 90+4'	Stadium: Olympic Stadium; Attendance: 18,532; Referee: Alan Kelly (Ireland)

17 November 2010 Friendly	Hungary	2–0	Lithuania	Székesfehérvár, Hungary
18:00 UTC+1	Priskin 61'; Dzsudzsák 80'	Report		Stadium: Sóstói Stadion; Attendance: 3,000; Referee: Bas Nijhuis (Netherlands)

=== 2011 ===
9 February 2011 Friendly	Azerbaijan	0–2	Hungary	Dubai, United Arab Emirates
21:00 UTC+4		Report	Rudolf 37'; Hajnal 81'	Stadium: Al Maktoum Stadium; Attendance: 1,000; Referee: Mohamed Al-Zarouni (United Arab Emirates)

25 March 2011 UEFA Euro 2012 qualifying	Hungary	0–4	Netherlands	Budapest, Hungary
20:30 UTC+1		Report	Van der Vaart 8'; Afellay 45'; Kuyt 54'; Van Persie 62'	Stadium: Ferenc Puskás Stadium; Attendance: 23,817; Referee: Carlos Velasco Carballo (Spain)

29 March 2011 UEFA Euro 2012 qualifying	Netherlands	5–3	Hungary	Amsterdam, Netherlands
20:30 UTC+2	Van Persie 13'; Sneijder 61'; Van Nistelrooy 73'; Kuyt 78', 81'	Report	Rudolf 46'; Gera 50', 75'	Stadium: Amsterdam Arena; Attendance: 51,774; Referee: Svein Oddvar Moen (Norway)

3 June 2011 Friendly	Luxembourg	0–1	Hungary	Luxembourg City, Luxembourg
20:15 UTC+2		Report	Szabics 53'	Stadium: Stade Josy Barthel; Attendance: 1,213; Referee: Þorvaldur Árnason (Iceland)

7 June 2011 UEFA Euro 2012 qualifying	San Marino	0–3	Hungary	Serravalle, San Marino
20:30 UTC+2		Report	Lipták 40'; Szabics 49'; Koman 83'	Stadium: Stadio Olimpico; Attendance: 1,915; Referee: Pavle Radovanović (Montenegro)

10 August 2011 Friendly	Hungary	4–0	Iceland	Budapest, Hungary
19:45 UTC+2	Koman 32'; Rudolf 45'; Dzsudzsák 59'; Elek 88'	Report		Stadium: Szusza Ferenc Stadion; Attendance: 12,508; Referee: Wolfgang Stark (Germany)

2 September 2011 UEFA Euro 2012 qualifying	Hungary	2–1	Sweden	Budapest, Hungary
19:45 UTC+2	Szabics 44'; Rudolf 90'	Report	Wilhelmsson 60'	Stadium: Ferenc Puskás Stadium; Attendance: 23,500; Referee: Damir Skomina (Slovenia)

6 September 2011 UEFA Euro 2012 qualifying	Moldova	0–2	Hungary	Chișinău, Moldova
20:45 UTC+3		Report	Vanczák 7'; Rudolf 83'	Stadium: Zimbru Stadium; Attendance: 10,500; Referee: Ivan Bebek (Croatia)

11 October 2011 UEFA Euro 2012 qualifying	Hungary	0–0	Finland	Budapest, Hungary
20:00 UTC+2		Report		Stadium: Ferenc Puskás Stadium; Attendance: 25,169; Referee: Alberto Undiano Mallenco (Spain)

11 November 2011 Friendly	Hungary	5–0	Liechtenstein	Budapest, Hungary
18:00 UTC+1	Priskin 10', 20'; Dzsudzsák 76'; Koman 79'; Feczesin 89'			Stadium: Ferenc Puskás Stadium; Attendance: 20,000; Referee: Cristian Balaj (Romania)

15 November 2011 Friendly	Poland	2–1	Hungary	Poznań, Poland
20:30 UTC+1	Brożek 37'; Vanczák 85' (o.g.)	Report	Priskin 79'	Stadium: Poznań Stadium; Attendance: 7,500; Referee: Hannes Kaasik (Estonia)

=== 2012 ===
29 February 2012 Friendly	Hungary	1–1	Bulgaria	Győr, Hungary
18:00 UTC+1	Szalai 42'	Report	Bojinov 87'	Stadium: ETO Park; Attendance: 15,000; Referee: Jonas Eriksson (Sweden)

1 June 2012 Friendly	Czech Republic	1–2	Hungary	Prague, Czech Republic
20:30 UTC+2	M. Kadlec 24' (pen.)	Report	Dzsudzsák 6'; Gyurcsó 88'	Stadium: Generali Arena; Attendance: 17,102; Referee: Lee Probert (England)

4 June 2012 Friendly	Hungary	0–0	Republic of Ireland	Budapest, Hungary
20:45 UTC+2		Report		Stadium: Ferenc Puskás Stadium; Attendance: 17,000; Referee: Kenn Hansen (Denmark)

15 August 2012 Friendly	Hungary	1–1	Israel	Budapest, Hungary
20:30 UTC+2	Dzsudzsák 51'	Report	Hemed 80'	Stadium: Ferenc Puskás Stadium; Attendance: 14,000; Referee: Ivan Kružliak (Slovakia)

7 September 2012 2014 World Cup qualification	Andorra	0–5	Hungary	Andorra la Vella, Andorra
20:30 UTC+2		Report	Juhász 12'; Gera 33'; Szalai 54'; Priskin 68'; Koman 82'	Stadium: Estadi Comunal; Attendance: 815; Referee: Emir Alecković (Bosnia and Herzegovina)

11 September 2012 2014 World Cup qualification	Hungary	1–4	Netherlands	Budapest, Hungary
20:30 UTC+2	Dzsudzsák 7' (pen.)	Report	Lens 3', 53'; Martins Indi 19'; Huntelaar 75'	Stadium: Ferenc Puskás Stadion; Attendance: 22,700; Referee: Pedro Proença (Portugal)

12 October 2012 2014 World Cup qualification	Estonia	0–1	Hungary	Tallinn, Estonia
21:30 UTC+3		Report	Hajnal 46'	Stadium: Lilleküla Stadium; Attendance: 5,661; Referee: Liran Liany (Israel)

16 October 2012 2014 World Cup qualification	Hungary	3–1	Turkey	Budapest, Hungary
20:30 UTC+2	Koman 31'; Szalai 50'; Gera 57' (pen.)	Report	Erdinç 22'	Stadium: Ferenc Puskás Stadion; Attendance: 21,563; Referee: Daniele Orsato (Italy)

14 November 2012 Friendly	Hungary	0–2	Norway	Budapest, Hungary
20:30 UTC+1		Report	Nielsen 39'; Abdellaoue 79'	Stadium: Ferenc Puskás Stadium; Attendance: 16,000; Referee: Marijo Strahonja (Croatia)

=== 2013 ===
6 February 2013 Friendly	Hungary	1–1	Belarus	Belek, Turkey
18:00 UTC+2	Szabics 32'	Report	Valadzko 58'	Stadium: İberostar Bellis Hotel Futbol Sahası; Attendance: 200; Referee: Bülent Yıldırım (Turkey)

22 March 2013 2014 World Cup qualification	Hungary	2–2	Romania	Budapest, Hungary
20:30 UTC+1	Vanczák 16'; Dzsudzsák 71' (pen.)	Report	Mutu 68' (pen.); Chipciu 90+2'	Stadium: Ferenc Puskás Stadion; Attendance: 0 (Note: Hungary v Romania was played without spectators due to sanctions imposed by FIFA as a result of racist chanting by Hungarian supporters at the friendly match against Israel on 15 August 2012.); Referee: Wolfgang Stark (Germany)

26 March 2013 2014 World Cup qualification	Turkey	1–1	Hungary	Istanbul, Turkey
20:30 UTC+2	Yılmaz 64'	Report	Böde 71'	Stadium: Şükrü Saracoğlu Stadium; Attendance: 37,904; Referee: Milorad Mažić (Serbia)

6 June 2013 Friendly	Hungary	1–0	Kuwait	Győr, Hungary
20:30 UTC+2	Vanczák 57'	Report		Stadium: ETO Park; Attendance: 8,000; Referee: Nikolaj Hänni (Switzerland)

14 August 2013 Friendly	Hungary	1–1	Czech Republic	Budapest, Hungary
20:30 UTC+2	Dzsudzsák 57' (pen.)	Report	Kozák 23'	Stadium: Ferenc Puskás Stadium; Attendance: 18,500; Referee: Howard Webb (England)

6 September 2013 2014 World Cup qualification	Romania	3–0	Hungary	Bucharest, Romania
21:00 UTC+3	Marica 2'; Pintilii 31'; Tănase 88'	Report		Stadium: Arena Națională; Attendance: 41,405; Referee: Alberto Undiano Mallenco (Spain)

10 September 2013 2014 World Cup qualification	Hungary	5–1	Estonia	Budapest, Hungary
20:30 UTC+2	Klavan 11' (o.g.); Hajnal 21'; Böde 41'; Németh 69'; Dzsudzsák 85'	Report	Kink 48'	Stadium: Ferenc Puskás Stadion; Attendance: 7,741; Referee: Aleksei Kulbakov (Belarus)

11 October 2013 2014 World Cup qualification	Netherlands	8–1	Hungary	Amsterdam, Netherlands
20:30 UTC+2	Van Persie 16', 44', 53'; Strootman 25'; Lens 38'; Devecseri 65' (o.g.); Van der Vaart 86'; Robben 90'	Report	Dzsudzsák 47' (pen.)	Stadium: Amsterdam Arena; Attendance: 52,027; Referee: Martin Atkinson (England)

15 October 2013 2014 World Cup qualification	Hungary	2–0	Andorra	Budapest, Hungary
20:00 UTC+2	Nikolić 51'; Lima 76' (o.g.)	Report		Stadium: Ferenc Puskás Stadion; Attendance: 5,200; Referee: Daniel Stefański (Poland)

=== 2014 ===
5 March 2014 Friendly	Hungary	1–2	Finland	Győr, Hungary
18:00 UTC+1	Rudolf 13'	Report	Pohjanpalo 74'; Eremenko 84' (pen.)	Stadium: ETO Park; Attendance: 14,000; Referee: Alexander Harkam (Austria)

22 May 2014 Friendly	Hungary	2–2	Denmark	Debrecen, Hungary
20:15 UTC+2	Dzsudzsák 25'; Varga 69'	Report	Eriksen 56'; Schöne 73'	Stadium: Nagyerdei Stadion; Attendance: 20,400; Referee: Szymon Marciniak (Poland)

4 June 2014 Friendly	Hungary	1–0	Albania	Budapest, Hungary
20:30 UTC+2	T. Priskin 82' (pen.)	Report		Stadium: Ferenc Puskás Stadium; Attendance: 4,492; Referee: Paul McLaughlin (Ireland)

7 June 2014 Friendly	Hungary	3–0	Kazakhstan	Budapest, Hungary
20:30 UTC+2	Priskin 26'; R. Varga 63'; Engel 90+1' (o.g.)	Report		Stadium: Ferenc Puskás Stadium; Attendance: 10,445; Referee: Alexandre Boucaut (Belgian)

7 September 2014 UEFA Euro 2016 qualifying	Hungary	1–2	Northern Ireland	Budapest, Hungary
18:00 UTC+2	Priskin 75'	Report	McGinn 81'; K. Lafferty 88'	Stadium: Groupama Arena; Attendance: 20,672; Referee: Deniz Aytekin (Germany)

11 October 2014 UEFA Euro 2016 qualifying	Romania	1–1	Hungary	Bucharest, Romania
19:00 UTC+3	Rusescu 45'	Report	Dzsudzsák 82'	Stadium: Arena Națională; Attendance: 52,000; Referee: William Collum (Scotland)

14 October 2014 UEFA Euro 2016 qualifying	Faroe Islands	0–1	Hungary	Tórshavn, Faroe Islands
19:45 UTC+1		Report	Szalai 21'	Stadium: Tórsvøllur; Attendance: 2,000; Referee: Aleksei Kulbakov (Belarus)

14 November 2014 UEFA Euro 2016 qualifying	Hungary	1–0	Finland	Budapest, Hungary
20:45 UTC+1	Gera 84'	Report		Stadium: Groupama Arena; Attendance: 19,600; Referee: Clément Turpin (France)

18 November 2014 Friendly	Hungary	1–2	Russia	Budapest, Hungary
20:30 UTC+1	Nikolić 86'	Report	Ignashevich 49'; Kerzhakov 80'	Stadium: Groupama Arena; Attendance: 5,340; Referee: Cüneyt Çakır (Turkey)

=== 2015 ===
29 March 2015 UEFA Euro 2016 qualifying	Hungary	0–0	Greece	Budapest, Hungary
20:45 UTC+2		Report		Stadium: Groupama Arena; Attendance: 22,000; Referee: Sergei Karasev (Russia)

5 June 2015 Friendly	Hungary	4–0	Lithuania	Debrecen, Hungary
18:30 UTC+2	Stieber 16'; Dzsudzsák 21'; Nikolić 30'; Priskin 31'	Report		Stadium: Nagyerdei Stadion; Attendance: 5,218; Referee: Miroslav Zelinka (Czech Republic)

13 June 2015 UEFA Euro 2016 qualifying	Finland	0–1	Hungary	Helsinki, Finland
19:00 UTC+3		Report	Stieber 82'	Stadium: Olympiastadion; Attendance: 20,434; Referee: Matej Jug (Slovenia)

4 September 2015 UEFA Euro 2016 qualifying	Hungary	0–0	Romania	Budapest, Hungary
20:45 UTC+2		Report		Stadium: Groupama Arena; Attendance: 22,060; Referee: Felix Brych (Germany)

7 September 2015 UEFA Euro 2016 qualifying	Northern Ireland	1–1	Hungary	Belfast, Northern Ireland
19:45 UTC+1	K. Lafferty 90+3'	Report	Guzmics 74'	Stadium: Windsor Park; Attendance: 10,200; Referee: Cüneyt Çakır (Turkey)

8 October 2015 UEFA Euro 2016 qualifying	Hungary	2–1	Faroe Islands	Budapest, Hungary
20:45 UTC+2	Böde 63', 71'	Report	Jakobsen 11'	Stadium: Groupama Arena; Attendance: 16,500; Referee: Robert Schörgenhofer (Austria)

11 October 2015 UEFA Euro 2016 qualifying	Greece	4–3	Hungary	Piraeus, Greece
19:00 UTC+2	Stafylidis 5'; Tachtsidis 57'; Mitroglou 79'; Kone 86'	Report	Lovrencsics 26'; Németh 55', 75'	Stadium: Karaiskakis Stadium; Attendance: 9,500; Referee: Ivan Bebek (Croatia)

12 November 2015 UEFA Euro 2016 qualifying play-offs	Norway	0–1	Hungary	Oslo, Norway
20:45 UTC+1		Report	Kleinheisler 26'	Stadium: Ullevaal Stadion; Attendance: 27,182; Referee: Mark Clattenburg (England)

15 November 2015 UEFA Euro 2016 qualifying play-offs	Hungary	2–1	Norway	Budapest, Hungary
20:45 UTC+1	Priskin 14'; Henriksen 83' (o.g.)	Report	Henriksen 87'	Stadium: Groupama Arena; Attendance: 22,189; Referee: Carlos Velasco Carballo (Spain)

=== 2016 ===
26 March 2016 Friendly	Hungary	1–1	Croatia	Budapest, Hungary
18:00 UTC+1	Mandžukić 18'	Report	Dzsudzsák 39'	Stadium: Groupama Arena; Attendance: 20,211; Referee: Radek Příhoda (Czech Republic)

20 May 2016 Friendly	Hungary	0–0	Ivory Coast	Budapest, Hungary
18:00 UTC+2		Report		Stadium: Groupama Arena; Attendance: 19,886; Referee: Vlado Glođović (Serbia)

4 June 2016 Friendly	Germany	2–0	Hungary	Gelsenkirchen, Germany
18:00 UTC+2	Lang 39' (o.g.); Müller 63'	Report		Stadium: Veltins-Arena; Attendance: 52,104; Referee: Martin Strömbergsson (Sweden)

14 June 2016 Euro 2016 Group F	Austria	0–2	Hungary	Bordeaux, France
18:00 UTC+2		Report	Szalai 62'; Stieber 87'	Stadium: Nouveau Stade de Bordeaux; Attendance: 34,424; Referee: Clément Turpin (France)

18 June 2016 Euro 2016 Group F	Iceland	1–1	Hungary	Marseille, France
18:00 UTC+2	G. Sigurðsson 40' (pen.)	Report	Sævarsson 88' (o.g.)	Stadium: Stade Vélodrome; Attendance: 60,842; Referee: Sergei Karasev (Russia)

22 June 2016 Euro 2016 Group F	Hungary	3–3	Portugal	Décines-Charpieu, France
18:00 UTC+2	Gera 19'; Dzsudzsák 47', 55'	Report	Nani 42'; Ronaldo 50', 62'	Stadium: Parc Olympique Lyonnais; Attendance: 55,514; Referee: Martin Atkinson (England)

26 June 2016 Euro 2016 Round of 16	Hungary	0–4	Belgium	Toulouse, France
21:00 20:45 UTC+2		Report	Alderweireld 10'; Batshuayi 78'; Hazard 80'; Carrasco 90+1'	Stadium: Stadium Municipal; Attendance: 28,921; Referee: Milorad Mažić (Serbia)

6 September 2016 2018 World Cup qualification	Faroe Islands	0–0	Hungary	Tórshavn, Faroe Islands
19:45 UTC+1		Report		Stadium: Tórsvøllur; Attendance: 4,066; Referee: Slavko Vinčić (Slovenia)

7 October 2016 2018 World Cup qualification	Hungary	2–3	Switzerland	Budapest, Hungary
20:45 UTC+2	Szalai 53', 71'		Seferovic 51'; Rodríguez 67'; Stocker 89'	Stadium: Groupama Arena; Attendance: 21,668; Referee: Björn Kuipers (Netherlands)

10 October 2016 2018 World Cup qualification	Latvia	0–2	Hungary	Riga, Latvia
21:45 UTC+3		Report	Gyurcsó 10'; Szalai 77'	Stadium: Skonto Stadium; Attendance: 4,715; Referee: Paweł Gil (Poland)

13 November 2016 2018 World Cup qualification	Hungary	4–0	Andorra	Budapest, Hungary
18:00 UTC+1	Gera 34'; Lang 43'; Gyurcsó 73'; Szalai 88'	Report		Stadium: Groupama Arena; Attendance: 20,479; Referee: Christos Nicolaides (Cyprus)

15 November 2016 Friendly	Hungary	0–2	Sweden	Budapest, Hungary
19:45 UTC+1			Larsson 30'; Kiese Thelin 67'	Stadium: Groupama Arena; Attendance: 16,842; Referee: Paolo Valeri (Italy)

=== 2017 ===
25 March 2017 2018 World Cup qualification	Portugal	3–0	Hungary	Lisbon, Portugal
19:45 UTC+0	A. Silva 32'; Ronaldo 36', 65'	Report		Stadium: Estádio da Luz; Attendance: 57,816; Referee: Szymon Marciniak (Poland)

5 June 2017 Friendly	Hungary	0–3	Russia	Budapest, Hungary
20:30 UTC+2		Report	Smolov 20'; Eppel 40' (o.g.); Poloz 89'	Stadium: Groupama Arena; Attendance: 12,442; Referee: Christian Dingert (Germany)

9 June 2017 2018 World Cup qualification	Andorra	1–0	Hungary	Andorra la Vella, Andorra
20:45 UTC+2	Rebés 26'	Report		Stadium: Estadi Nacional; Attendance: 2,407; Referee: Charalambos Kalogeropoulos (Greece)

31 August 2017 2018 World Cup qualification	Hungary	3–1	Latvia	Budapest, Hungary
20:45 UTC+2	Kádár 6'; Szalai 26'; Dzsudzsák 68'	Report	Freimanis 40'	Stadium: Groupama Arena; Attendance: 16,500; Referee: Yevhen Aranovsky (Ukraine)

3 September 2017 2018 World Cup qualification	Hungary	0–1	Portugal	Budapest, Hungary
20:45 UTC+2		Report	A. Silva 48'	Stadium: Groupama Arena; Attendance: 21,800; Referee: Danny Makkelie (Netherlands)

7 October 2017 2018 World Cup qualification	Switzerland	5–2	Hungary	Basel, Switzerland
20:45 UTC+2	Xhaka 18'; Frei 20'; Zuber 43', 49'; Lichtsteiner 83'	Report	Guzmics 59'; Ugrai 89'	Stadium: St. Jakob-Park; Attendance: 32,018; Referee: Paolo Tagliavento (Italy)

10 October 2017 2018 World Cup qualification	Hungary	1–0	Faroe Islands	Budapest, Hungary
20:45 UTC+2	Böde 81'	Report		Stadium: Groupama Arena; Attendance: 21,400; Referee: Roi Reinshreiber (Israel)

9 November 2017 Friendly	Luxembourg	2–1	Hungary	Luxembourg City, Luxembourg
20:00 UTC+1	Joachim 15'; Da Graça 84'	Report	Nikolić 18'	Stadium: Stade Josy Barthel; Attendance: 1,873; Referee: Sébastien Delferière (Belgium)

14 November 2017 Friendly	Hungary	1–0	Costa Rica	Budapest, Hungary
20:15 UTC+1	Nikolić 37'	Report		Stadium: Groupama Arena; Attendance: 9,860; Referee: Alexander Harkam (Austria)

=== 2018 ===
23 March 2018 Friendly	Hungary	2–3	Kazakhstan	Budapest, Hungary
19:00 UTC+1	Szalai 21'; Németh 68'	Report	Murtazayev 6'; Zaynutdinov 10'; Seydakhmet 39'	Stadium: Groupama Arena; Attendance: 9,038; Referee: Tomasz Musiał (Poland)

27 March 2018 Friendly	Hungary	0–1	Scotland	Budapest, Hungary
20:00 UTC+2		Report	Phillips 48'	Stadium: Groupama Arena; Attendance: 8,942; Referee: Harald Lechner (Austria)

6 June 2018 Friendly	Belarus	1–1	Hungary	Brest, Belarus
20:00 UTC+3	Saroka 26'	Report	Varga 29'	Stadium: Regional Sport Complex Brestsky; Attendance: 8,400; Referee: Sergey Lapochkin (Russia)

9 June 2018 Friendly	Hungary	1–2	Australia	Budapest, Hungary
17:30 UTC+2	Sainsbury 88' (o.g.)	Report	Arzani 74'; Kadar 90' (o.g.)	Stadium: Groupama Arena; Attendance: 10,091; Referee: Matej Jug (Slovenia)

8 September 2018 Nations League	Finland	1–0	Hungary	Tampere, Finland
19:00 UTC+3	Pukki 7'	Report		Stadium: Tampere Stadium; Attendance: 10,220; Referee: Gediminas Mažeika (Lithuania)

11 September 2018 Nations League	Hungary	2–1	Greece	Budapest, Hungary
20:45 UTC+2	Sallai 15'; Kleinheisler 43'	Report	Manolas 18'	Stadium: Groupama Arena; Attendance: 120 (Note: The Hungary v Greece match was played behind closed doors due to a UEFA punishment against Hungary for racist behaviour in their UEFA Euro 2016 qualifying home match against Romania.); Referee: Aleksei Kulbakov (Belarus)

12 October 2018 Nations League	Greece	1–0	Hungary	Athens, Greece
21:45 UTC+3	Mitroglou 65'	Report		Stadium: Olympic Stadium; Attendance: 9,040; Referee: Tobias Stieler (Germany)

15 October 2018 Nations League	Estonia	3–3	Hungary	Tallinn, Estonia
21:45 UTC+3	Luts 20'; Pátkai 70' (o.g.); Anier 79'	Report	D. Nagy 24'; Szalai 54', 81'	Stadium: A. Le Coq Arena; Attendance: 3,043; Referee: Halis Özkahya (Turkey)

14 November 2018 Nations League	Hungary	2–0	Estonia	Budapest, Hungary
20:45 UTC+1	Orbán 8'; Szalai 69'	Report		Stadium: Groupama Arena; Attendance: 7,775; Referee: Enea Jorgji (Albania)

18 November 2018 Nations League	Hungary	2–0	Finland	Budapest, Hungary
20:45 UTC+1	Szalai 29'; Á. Nagy 37'	Report		Stadium: Groupama Arena; Attendance: 9,200; Referee: Slavko Vinčić (Slovenia)

=== 2019 ===
21 March 2019 UEFA Euro 2020 qualifying	Slovakia	2–0	Hungary	Trnava, Slovakia
20:45 UTC+1	Duda 42'; Rusnák 85'	Report		Stadium: Anton Malatinský Stadium; Attendance: 14,235; Referee: Vladislav Bezborodov (Russia)

24 March 2019 UEFA Euro 2020 qualifying	Hungary	2–1	Croatia	Budapest, Hungary
18:00 UTC+1	Szalai 34'; Pátkai 76'	Report	Rebić 13'	Stadium: Groupama Arena; Attendance: 19,400; Referee: Willie Collum (Scotland)

8 June 2019 UEFA Euro 2020 qualifying	Azerbaijan	1–3	Hungary	Baku, Azerbaijan
20:00 UTC+4	Emreli 69'	Report	Orbán 18', 53'; Holman 71'	Stadium: Bakcell Arena; Attendance: 10,450; Referee: Kevin Blom (Netherlands)

11 June 2019 UEFA Euro 2020 qualifying	Hungary	1–0	Wales	Budapest, Hungary
20:45 UTC+2	Pátkai 80'	Report		Stadium: Groupama Arena; Attendance: 18,350; Referee: Matej Jug (Slovenia)

5 September 2019 Friendly	Montenegro	2–1	Hungary	Podgorica, Montenegro
20:45 UTC+2	Kosović 32'; Mugoša 75' (pen.)	Report	Holender 2'	Stadium: Podgorica City Stadium; Attendance: 3,370; Referee: Dimitar Meckarovski (North Macedonia)

9 September 2019 UEFA Euro 2020 qualifying	Hungary	1–2	Slovakia	Budapest, Hungary
20:45 UTC+2	Szoboszlai 50'	Report	Mak 40'; Boženík 56'	Stadium: Groupama Arena; Attendance: 21,700; Referee: Antonio Mateu Lahoz (Spain)

10 October 2019 UEFA Euro 2020 qualifying	Croatia	3–0	Hungary	Split, Croatia
20:45 UTC+2	Modrić 5'; Petković 24', 42'	Report		Stadium: Stadion Poljud; Attendance: 32,110; Referee: Daniele Orsato (Italy)

13 October 2019 UEFA Euro 2020 qualifying	Hungary	1–0	Azerbaijan	Budapest, Hungary
18:00 UTC+2	Korhut 10'	Report		Stadium: Groupama Arena; Attendance: 11,300; Referee: Dennis Higler (Netherlands)

15 November 2019 Friendly	Hungary	1–2	Uruguay	Budapest, Hungary
19:00 UTC+1	Szalai 24'	Report	Cavani 15'; B. Rodríguez 21'	Stadium: Puskás Aréna; Attendance: 65,114; Referee: Damir Skomina (Slovenia)

19 November 2019 UEFA Euro 2020 qualifying	Wales	2–0	Hungary	Cardiff, Wales
19:45 UTC+0	Ramsey 15', 47'	Report		Stadium: Cardiff City Stadium; Attendance: 31,762; Referee: Ovidiu Hațegan (Romania)
