= Oldřich Zajíček =

Czech footballer (1911–1956)

Personal information
- Date of birth: 5 August 1911
- Place of birth: Žižkov, Bohemia, Austria-Hungary
- Date of death: 21 March 1956 (aged 44)
- Position: Forward

Senior career*
Years	Team	Apps	(Gls)
1931–1934	Viktoria Žižkov	53	(28)
1934–1939	Sparta Prague	64	(30)
1939–1944	Viktoria Žižkov	33	(7)

International career
1933–1936	Czechoslovakia	6	(2)
- * Club domestic league appearances and goals

Oldřich Zajíček (5 August 1911 – 21 March 1956) was a Czechoslovak footballer who played as a forward. He had six caps for the Czechoslovakia national team.

== Career ==
Zajíček started his career at Viktoria Žižkov, making his debut on 10 May 1931 against SK Kladno. Following the club's relegation in the 1933–34 season, he joined Sparta Prague, where he went on to win three Czechoslovak First League titles in five seasons, as well as the 1935 Mitropa Cup, before returning to Viktoria Žižkov in 1939. Overall, he played 151 matches in the First League, scoring 67 goals.

He made his debut for the Czechoslovakia national team on 19 March 1933, in a 2–0 defeat to Hungary. In total, he made six international appearances for Czechoslovakia between 1933 and 1936, including once in both the 1933–1935 and 1936–1938 Central European International Cups, scoring twice.

== Career statistics ==
=== International goals ===
Scores and results list Czechoslovakia's goal tally first, score column indicates score after each Zajíček goal.

List of international goals scored by Oldřich Zajíček
No.	Date	Venue	Opponent	Score	Result	Competition
1	22 March 1936	Praterstadion, Vienna, Austria	Austria	1–0	1–1	1936–1938 Central European International Cup
2	26 April 1936	Stadion Letná, Prague, Czechoslovakia	Spain	1–0	1–0	Friendly
