= Rudolf Geiter =

Austrian footballer

Personal information
- Date of birth: 18 April 1913
- Date of death: 30 September 1978 (aged 65)
- Position: Midfielder

Senior career*
Years	Team	Apps	(Gls)
1924–1928	Wiener Sport-Club		
1933	Grasshopper Zürich		
1933–1946	Wiener Sport-Club		

International career
1936–1937	Austria	7	(2)
- * Club domestic league appearances and goals

Rudolf Geiter (18 April 1913 – 30 September 1978) was an Austrian football forward who played for Austria. He also played for Wiener Sport-Club and Grasshopper Zürich.
