= Evert van der Heijden =

Dutch footballer

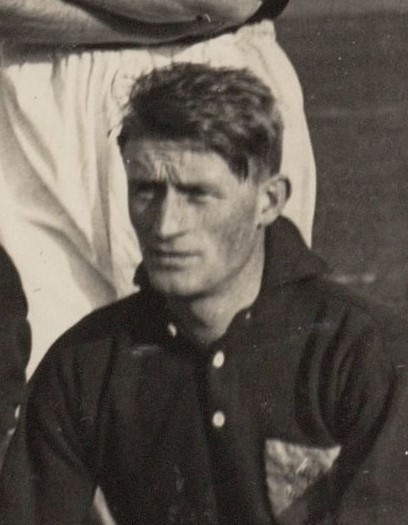
- Evert van der Heijden in 1929

Personal information
- Date of birth: 15 October 1900
- Place of birth: Wageningen, Netherlands
- Date of death: 27 December 1959 (aged 59)
- Place of death: Wageningen, Netherlands
- Position: Inside left

Senior career*
Years	Team	Apps	(Gls)
1917–1937	WVV Wageningen		

International career
1929–1931	Netherlands	8	(1)
- * Club domestic league appearances and goals

Evert van der Heijden (15 October 1900 – 27 December 1959) was a Dutch footballer. He played in eight matches for the Netherlands national football team from 1929 to 1931.

Van der Heijden played 20 years for WVV Wageningen ands scored the 250th goals in the history of the national team in 1930 against Hungary. he was Wageningen's only ever international player. A street in Wageningen was named after him.
