= József Turay =

Hungarian footballer

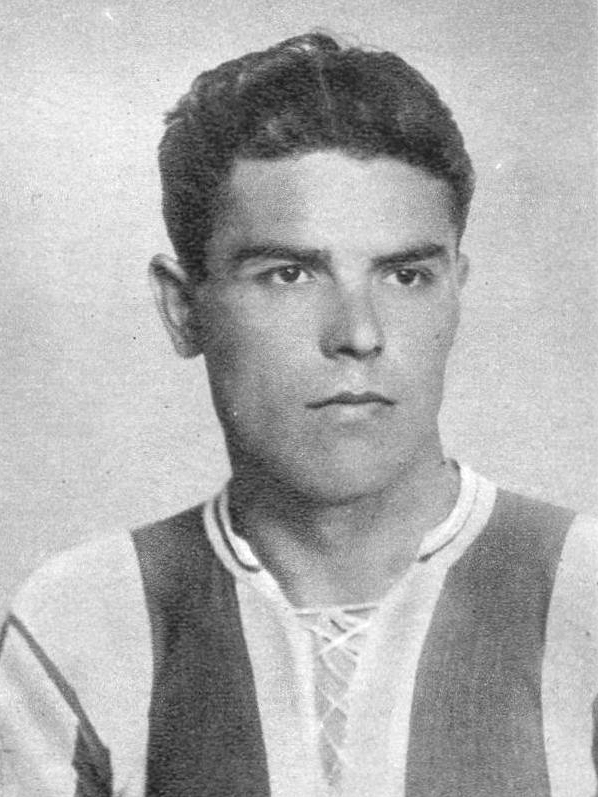

Personal information
- Date of birth: 1 March 1905
- Place of birth: Eger, Austria-Hungary
- Date of death: 24 June 1963 (aged 58)
- Place of death: Budapest, Hungary
- Position: Forward

Senior career*
| Years | Team | Apps | (Gls) |
| –1926 | Röppentyű utcai SC | | |
| 1926–1933 | Ferencvárosi TC | 115 | (62) |
| 1933–1940 | MTK Hungária FC | 155 | (28) |
| 1940 | Ganz TE | | |
| 1941–1942 | Újvidéki AC | 3 | (0) |

International career
| 1928–1939 | Hungary | 48 | (11) |
Medal record
Representing Hungary
FIFA World Cup
| Runner-up | 1938 France |
- * Club domestic league appearances and goals

József Turay (1 March 1905 – 24 June 1963) was a Hungarian football forward who played for Hungary in the 1938 FIFA World Cup.

He played with Ferencvárosi TC, MTK Hungária FC and Újvidéki AC in the Hungarian Championship. He also played for Ganz TE.

== Fifa World Cup Career ==
| National team | Year | Apps | Goals | Assists |
|---|---|---|---|---|
| Hungary | 1938 | 3 | 0 | 0 |
