= Leopold Neumer =

Austrian footballer

Personal information
- Date of birth: 8 February 1919
- Date of death: 19 March 1990 (aged 71)
- Position: Striker

Senior career*
Years	Team	Apps	(Gls)
1933–1935	1. Simmeringer SC		
1935–1947	Austria Vienna		
1947-1952	1.Simmeringer SC		

International career
1937–1946	Austria	4	(2)
1938	Germany	1	(0)
- * Club domestic league appearances and goals

Leopold Neumer (8 February 1919 – 19 March 1990) was an Austrian-German football striker.

== Career ==
He earned 4 caps and scored 2 goals for the Austria national football team. After the annexation of Austria by Germany, he earned 1 cap for the Germany national football team, and participated in the 1938 FIFA World Cup. He spent his club career at FK Austria Wien.
