= Leopold Hofmann (footballer) =

Austrian footballer

Personal information
- Date of birth: 31 October 1905
- Place of birth: Vienna, Austria-Hungary
- Date of death: 9 January 1976 (aged 70)
- Position: Midfielder

Senior career*
Years	Team	Apps	(Gls)
1924–1939	First Vienna FC		

International career
1925–1937	Austria	27	(1)
- * Club domestic league appearances and goals

Leopold Hofmann (31 October 1905 – 9 January 1976) was an Austrian football midfielder who played for Austria in the 1934 FIFA World Cup. He also played for First Vienna FC.

== Statistics ==
=== International ===
Appearances and goals by national team and year
National team	Year	Apps	Goals
Austria
Austria	1925	1	0
Austria	1927	5	0
Austria	1928	2	0
Austria	1930	4	0
Austria	1931	2	0
Austria	1932	4	0
Austria	1934	3	0
Austria	1935	3	1
Austria	1936	1	0
Austria	1937	2	0
Total		27	1

=== International goals ===
International goals by date, venue, cap, opponent, score, result and competition
No.	Date	Venue	Cap	Opponent	Score	Result	Competition
1	6 October 1935	Praterstadion, Vienna, Austria	24	Hungary	4–4	4–4	1933–35 Central European International Cup
