= Ferenc Kolláth =

Hungarian footballer

Personal information
- Date of birth: 6 October 1914
- Place of birth: Szolnok, Hungary
- Date of death: 11 December 1986 (aged 72)
- Place of death: Szolnok, Hungary
- Position: Midfielder

International career
Years	Team	Apps	(Gls)
1939–1942	Hungary	5	(0)

Ferenc Kolláth (6 October 1914 – 11 December 1986) was a Hungarian footballer. He played in five matches for the Hungary national football team from 1939 to 1942. He was also part of Hungary's squad for the football tournament at the 1936 Summer Olympics, but he did not play in any matches.
