= József Horváth (footballer, born 1890) =

Hungarian footballer (1890–1945)

Personal information
- Date of birth: 25 September 1890
- Place of birth: Budapest, Austria-Hungary
- Date of death: 23 February 1945 (aged 54)
- Position: Striker

Senior career*
Years	Team	Apps	(Gls)
1906–1914	Budapesti TC	32	(11)

International career
1906–1914	Hungary	6	(5)
- * Club domestic league appearances and goals

József Horváth (25 September 1890 – 23 February 1945), nicknamed Flamó, was a Hungarian footballer. He holds the record for the youngest player ever to score a hat-trick for a national team.

== Career ==
Horváth played for Budapesti TC, in which they finished third in the Nemzeti Bajnokság I twice, in 1908–09 and 1912–13. He also played in both matches against MTK Budapest FC in the 1909–10 Magyar Kupa.

Horváth made his debut for Hungary against Bohemia on 1 April 1906, at the age of 15 years and 188 days, thus becoming the youngest player in the history of the Hungarian national team, a record that still stands by nearly a year; as well as the second youngest player in the history of European international football, only behind Samuel Johnston of Ireland (15 years and 153 days). He earned his next cap for Hungary six months later, on 7 October 1906, scoring twice to salvage a 4–4 draw against Bohemia, and in doing so at the age of 16 years and 12 days, he not only became the country's youngest-ever scorer, a record that still stands; but also the second youngest scorer in European international football, once again only behind Johnston.

On 7 April 1907, Horváth scored a hat-trick against Bohemia, and in doing so at the age of 16 years and 194 days, he became the youngest ever to do so in international football, a record that still stands.

In total, Horváth managed to play six matches for Hungary scoring five goals, all of them against Bohemia. However, Horváth was forced to retire early due to lower back problems.

== Career statistics ==
=== Goals for Hungary ===
Hungary score listed first, score column indicates score after each Horváth goal.

List of international goals scored by József Horváth
No.	Date	Venue	Opponent	Score	Result	Competition
1	7 October 1906	Stadion Slavii, Prague, Kingdom of Bohemia	Bohemia	1–1	4–4	Friendly
2	7 October 1906	Stadion Slavii, Prague, Kingdom of Bohemia	Bohemia	4–3	4–4	Friendly
3	7 April 1907	Millenáris Sporttelep, Budapest, Hungary	Bohemia	1–1	5–2	Friendly
4	7 April 1907	Millenáris Sporttelep, Budapest, Hungary	Bohemia	3–2	5–2	Friendly
5	7 April 1907	Millenáris Sporttelep, Budapest, Hungary	Bohemia	5–2	5–2	Friendly

== See also ==
- List of footballers who achieved hat-trick records
