= Gyula Polgár =

Hungarian footballer

Personal information
- Full name: Gyula Polgár
- Date of birth: 8 February 1912
- Place of birth: Hungary
- Date of death: 18 June 1992 (aged 80)
- Place of death: Sydney, Australia
- Height: 1.77 m (5 ft 10 in)
- Position: Defender

Senior career*
Years	Team	Apps	(Gls)
- Ferencváros TC

International career
1932–1942	Hungary	26	(2)
Medal record
Representing Hungary
FIFA World Cup
Runner-up	1938 France
- * Club domestic league appearances and goals

Gyula Polgár (8 February 1912 – 18 June 1992) was a footballer who played for the Hungary national team. His birth name was Gyula Pigniczki.

He played for Hungary in the 1938 FIFA World Cup Final, having not competed in any of the earlier fixtures in the tournament.

At the time of the 1938 tournament he was playing his club football with Ferencváros TC.

After the 1938 World Cup, he played in a friendly for Hungary against Scotland on 7 December 1938. In total he made 26 appearances for Hungary between 1932 and 1942, and scored two goals.

He later worked as a coach in Australia.
