= Jan van den Broek =

Dutch footballer (1907–1964)

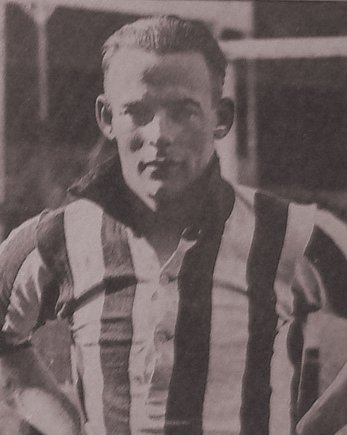

Personal information
- Date of birth: 8 June 1907
- Place of birth: Breda, Netherlands
- Date of death: 7 November 1964 (aged 57)
- Position: Forward

Senior career*
Years	Team	Apps	(Gls)
1924-1927	NAC		
1927-1937	PSV	200	(154)

International career
1927–1933	Netherlands	11	(4)

Managerial career
- 1938-1942: PSV
- * Club domestic league appearances and goals

Jan van den Broek (8 June 1907 – 7 November 1964) was a Dutch footballer. He played in eleven matches for the Netherlands national football team from 1927 to 1933.
