= János Dudás =

Hungarian footballer

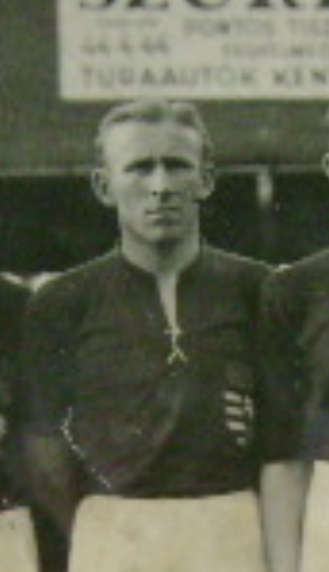
- János Dudás

Personal information
- Full name: János Dudás
- Date of birth: 13 February 1911
- Place of birth: Hungary
- Date of death: 4 November 1979
- Position: Midfielder

Senior career*
Years	Team	Apps	(Gls)
- MTK Budapest FC

International career
1935–1942	Hungary	21	(3)
Medal record
Representing Hungary
FIFA World Cup
Runner-up	1938 France
- * Club domestic league appearances and goals

János Dudás (13 February 1911 - 1979) was a Hungarian football midfielder who played for Hungary in the 1934 and 1938 FIFA World Cups. He also played for MTK Budapest F.C.
