= Walter Lewington =

English football referee and actor (1891–1965)

- Full name: Walter James Lewington
- Born: 2 September 1891; Gillingham, Kent, England
- Died: 29 May 1965 (aged 73); Addiscombe, London, England

Domestic
Years	League	Role
?–1939	Football League First Division	Referee

International
Years	League	Role
1933–39	FIFA listed	Referee

Walter James Lewington (2 September 1891 – 29 May 1965) was an English football referee who officiated matches in Spain from 1933 to 1939. He also had a brief acting career.

== Refereeing career ==
Born in Gillingham on 2 September 1891, Lewington received his qualification as a football referee in the early 1920s, and after over a decade of refereeing matches in the Second and First English Divisions, the FA's Referees Committee nominated him as an international referee in 1933, thus becoming o referee of FIFA. As such, he officiated a total of 15 international matches between 1933 and 1939, including four Central European International Cup matches.

On 12 February 1933, the 41-year-old Lewington made his international debut, refereeing a friendly match between Belgium and Italy in Brussels, which ended in a 2–3 win to the latter. He went on to officiate a further two matches of the Italian national team in 1935 and 1937, with the Italians scoring two goals in both matches, all of which being netted by Silvio Piola, who thus registered a ratio of two goals per game in matches refereed by him. On 24 January 1935, he refereed a friendly between Spain and France at the Estadio Chamartín, which ended in a 2–0 win to the former; the journalists of the Spanish newspaper La Vanguardia stated that "Mr. Lewington's refereeing has not been detrimental since he allowed the French to have their say, being tolerant of much violence" and that "he also allowed himself to be influenced by the linesmen".

In November 1936, Lewington helped Austrian sports journalist David Weiss to arrange a 14-day tour of the United Kingdom for the Yugoslavian club Građanski Zagreb, who used this tour as a chance to learn the more advanced tactics of the British clubs, thus adopting the WM formation, which some sources say helped them win the 1936–37 Yugoslav championship. In the following year, in March 1937, he and Weiss partnered again to arrange another tour, but this time for a different Yugoslavian club, SK Jugoslavija, and also to a different place, the British Isles, where they faced and lost to an Irish league XI on 17 March. Just two months later, on 17 May, Lewington refereed an international match between Ireland and Switzerland in Bern, which ended in a 0–1 win to the former. A few days later, on 27 May, he oversaw a match between Građanski Zagreb and Chelsea in Zagreb, which ended in a 0–1 win to the London club.

== Acting career ==
In 1939, Lewington had a small acting role in the British mystery film The Arsenal Stadium Mystery, which was one of the first feature films where football is a central element in the plot; he played a referee.

== Death ==
Lewington died in Addiscombe on 29 May 1965, at the age of 73.
