= Ferenc Rudas =

Hungarian footballer, coach, and administrator

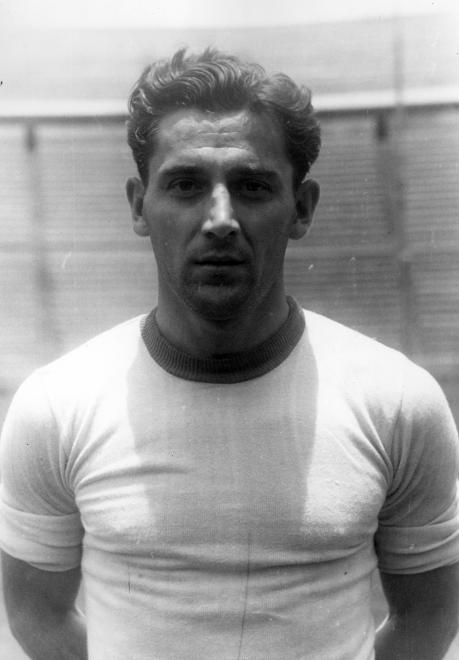

Personal information
- Date of birth: 6 July 1921
- Place of birth: Budapest, Hungary
- Date of death: 11 February 2016 (aged 94)
- Position: Defender

Senior career*
Years	Team	Apps	(Gls)
1938–1954	Ferencváros	276	(25)

International career
1943–1949	Hungary	23	(3)
- * Club domestic league appearances and goals

Ferenc Rudas (6 July 1921 – 11 February 2016) was a Hungarian football player, coach and administrator.

== Career ==
Born in Budapest, Rudas played as a defender for Ferencváros, scoring 25 goals in 276 league appearances.

He was also a Hungarian international, scoring 3 goals in 23 games between 1943 and 1949.

After retiring as a player in 1954, he worked as a coach, for the Hungarian Football Federation, and on the board at Ferencváros.

He died on 11 February 2016 at the age of 94.
