= László Gyetvai =

Hungarian footballer

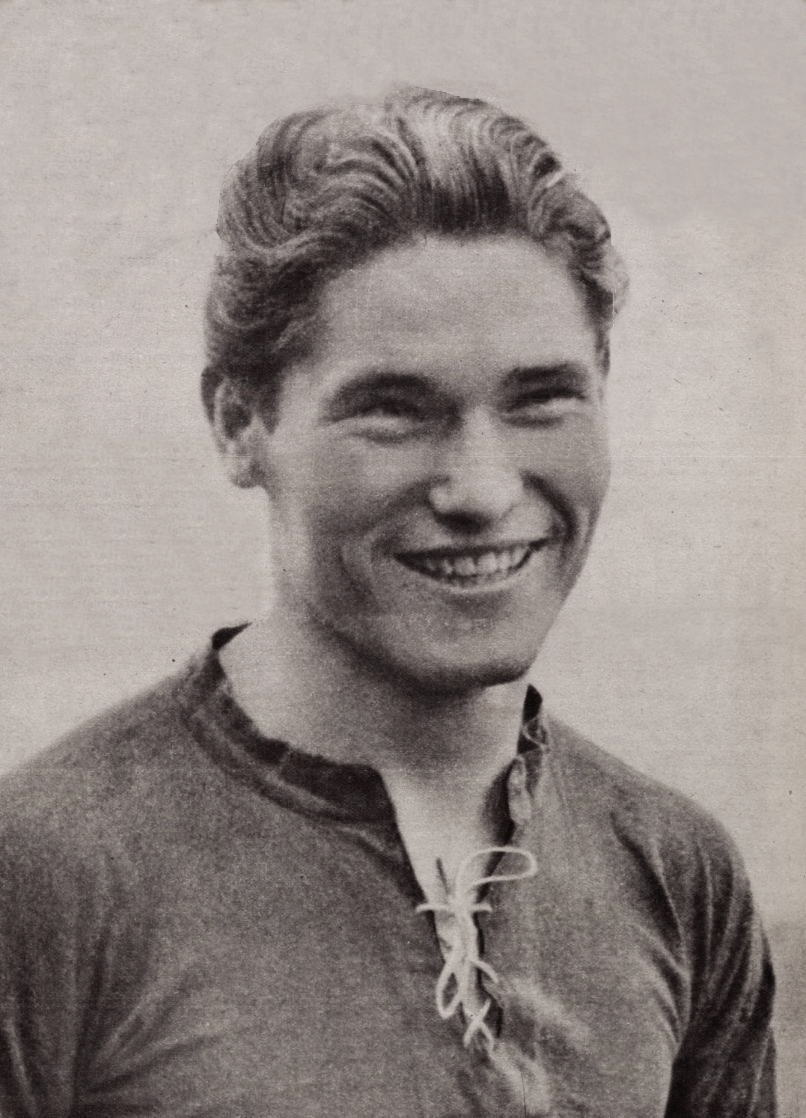
- Gyetvai in 1944

Personal information
- Date of birth: 11 December 1918
- Place of birth: Zólyom, Hungary
- Date of death: 28 August 2013 (aged 94)
- Place of death: Budapest, Hungary
- Position: Forward

Youth career
- 1933–1937: Ferencváros

Senior career*
| Years | Team | Apps | (Gls) |
| 1937–1948 | Ferencváros | 161 | (66) |
| Total | | 161 | (66) |

International career
| 1938–1942 | Hungary | 17 | (3) |

Managerial career
- 1956–1959: Egyetértés SC
- * Club domestic league appearances and goals

László Gyetvai (11 December 1918 – 28 August 2013) was a Hungarian professional footballer who played as a forward for Ferencváros and the Hungary national team.

== Death ==
Gyetvai died on 28 August 2013 in Budapest at the age of 94. He was the oldest living Hungarian international footballer.
