= Géza Toldi =

Hungarian footballer

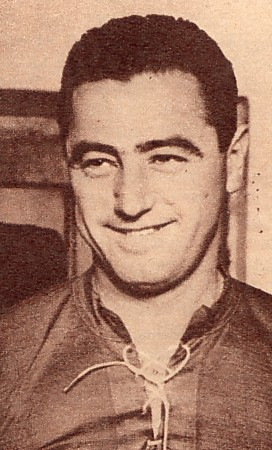
- Geza in 1928

Personal information
- Date of birth: 11 February 1909
- Place of birth: Budapest, Austria-Hungary
- Date of death: 16 August 1985 (aged 76)
- Place of death: Budapest, Hungary
- Position: Striker

Senior career*
Years	Team	Apps	(Gls)
1927–1939	Ferencvárosi TC	214	(203)
1939–1941	Gamma FC	36	(22)
1941–1942	Szegedi AK	30	(24)
1942–1943	Ferencvárosi TC	11	(10)
1945–1946	Zuglói MADISZ	32	(11)
Total		323	(270)

International career
1929–1940	Hungary	46	(25)

Managerial career
- Zuglói MADISZ
- 1949–1950: Vaasan Palloseura
- 1950–1954: Odense Boldklub
- 1954–1956: AGF
- 1956–1957: Zamalek SC
- 1957: Flyserd IF
- 1957–1958: Belgium
- 1958–1960: K. Berchem Sport
- 1960–1964: AGF
- 1965–1967: Viby IF
- 1967–1969: B 1909
- 1970–1971: IK Skovbakken
- 1972–1975: Braedstrup Horsens
Medal record
Representing Hungary
FIFA World Cup
Runner-up	1938 France
- * Club domestic league appearances and goals

Géza Toldi (11 February 1909 – 16 August 1985) was a Hungarian footballer who played as a forward. He played for Ferencvárosi TC, and from 1934 to 1938 for the Hungarian national team, serving as captain in 1936. He scored a goal in the 1938 FIFA World Cup.

== Club career ==
He grew up in the railway houses of Avar Street in Buda, Németvölgy. He began playing football in his place of residence, featuring for one of the local teams, ITE, in the fourth division of the youth championship, and he was pivotal in helping the club climb one division at a time almost every year, and in 1928 they also won the first division championship.

In 1928, he was noticed at the youth federation's Christmas round-robin tournament. He received offers from several teams, including Oradea and Ferencvárosi, and in the end, he chose the latter, staying with them for more than a decade, until 1939, and again from 1942 to 1943. He played in a total of 324 Nemzeti Bajnokság I matches, scoring 270 goals.

In 1939, Ferencvárosi lost 1-3 at the home of Bologna. In the second leg, the player, who was already considered "old," was added to the team due to injury. Ferencváros won 4-1, and the goals were all scored by Géza Toldi.

== International career ==
Between 1929 and 1940, he earned 46 caps for Hungary and scored a total of 25 goals. The highlight of his international career came in the 1936-38 edition, where he scored 5 goals, a tally that includes a hat-tricks against Austria in a 5-3 win on 27 September 1936. With 10 goals in the Central European Cup, he is among the top goal scorers in the competition's history. Toldi was also part of the Hungary team that played in two World Cups in the 1930s, in 1934 and in 1938, helping his nation reach the final of the latter, which they lost 2-4 to Italy.

== Managerial career ==
Between 1950 and 1954 he coached Danish top-flight side Odense Boldklub, before he became head coach for AGF Aarhus from 1954 to 1956, where he became the first coach to win the Danish double and in his first season in 1954–55, which also was the first championship and Danish Cup tournament AGF had won. He went on to win his second Danish Championship with AGF in 1955–56, then took over as head coach of Zamalek in 1956–57, and won with the Cairo giants the 1957 Egypt Cup. He then went on and coached the Belgium national football team, the "Red Devils", for six games from 27 October 1957 to 26 May 1958. He was succeeded by Constant Vanden Stock.

Thereafter, he became coach of the Belgian first division team K. Berchem Sport in 1958–59 and 1959–60, before he once again returned to Denmark to coach AGF Aarhus from 1960 to 1964, winning the double in 1960 and thus becoming the most successful coach in the club's very long history. He also coached B 1909.

== International goals ==
Hungary score listed first, score column indicates score after each Sárosi goal.

list of international goals scored by Géza Toldi
No.	Cap	Date	Venue	Opponent	Score	Result	Competition
1	1	14 April 1929	Stadion Wankdorf, Bern, Switzerland	Switzerland	3–2	5–4	1927-30 Central European Cup
2	3	13 April 1930	Stadion Rankhof, Basel, Switzerland	Switzerland	1–1	2–2	Friendly
3	3	13 April 1930	Stadion Rankhof, Basel, Switzerland	Switzerland	2–1	2–2	Friendly
4	5	8 June 1930	Üllői úti stadion, Budapest, Hungary	Netherlands	4–1	6–2	Friendly
5	8	20 March 1932	Letná Stadium, Prague, Czechoslovakia	Czechoslovakia	3–1	3–1	Friendly
6	10	8 May 1932	Hungária körúti stadion, Budapest, Hungary	Italy	1–1	1–1	1931-32 Central European Cup
7	12	18 September 1932	Letná Stadium, Prague, Czechoslovakia	Czechoslovakia	1–1	2–1	1931-32 Central European Cup
8	14	2 July 1933	Råsunda Stadium, Solna, Sweden	Sweden	2–2	2–5	Friendly
9	18	25 March 1934	Stadion Balgarska Armia, Sofia, Bulgaria	Bulgaria	3–1	4–1	1934 World Cup qualifying
10	22	29 April 1934	Stadio Giorgio Ascarelli, Naples, Italy	Egypt	2–0	4–2	1934 World Cup round of 16
11	22	29 April 1934	Stadio Giorgio Ascarelli, Naples, Italy	Egypt	4–2	4–2	1934 World Cup round of 16
12	24	7 October 1934	Hungária körúti stadion, Budapest, Hungary	Austria	3–1	3–1	1933-35 Central European Cup
13	25	12 May 1935	Üllői úti stadion, Budapest, Hungary	Austria	6–3	6–3	Friendly
14	27	6 October 1935	Praterstadion, Vienna, Austria	Austria	1–0	4–4	1933-35 Central European Cup
15	28	10 November 1935	Üllői úti stadion, Budapest, Hungary	Switzerland	2–0	6–1	Friendly
16	31	27 September 1936	Üllői úti stadion, Budapest, Hungary	Austria	1–1	5–3	1936-38 Central European Cup
17	31	27 September 1936	Üllői úti stadion, Budapest, Hungary	Austria	2–2	5–3	1936-38 Central European Cup
18	31	27 September 1936	Üllői úti stadion, Budapest, Hungary	Austria	4–2	5–3	1936-38 Central European Cup
19	32	4 October 1936	Stadionul ONEF, Bucharest, Romania	Romania	2–1	2–1	Friendly
20	33	18 October 1936	Letná Stadium, Prague, Czechoslovakia	Czechoslovakia	2–2	2–5	1936-38 Central European Cup
21	34	6 December 1936	Dalymount Park, Dublin, Ireland	Irish Free State	3–1	3–2	Friendly
22	38	14 November 1937	Üllői úti stadion, Budapest, Hungary	Switzerland	2–0	2–0	1936-38 Central European Cup
23	30	20 March 1938	Stadion der Hitlerjugend, Nuremberg, Germany	Germany	1–1	1–1	Friendly
24	40	5 June 1938	Stade Municipal Velodrome, Reims, France	Dutch East Indies	2–0	6–0	1938 World Cup round of 16
25	57	7 April 1940	Berlin, Berlin, Germany	Germany	1–1	2–2	Friendly

== Honours ==
=== Player ===
==== Club ====
Ferencváros

- Hungarian National Championship (4): 1928, 1932, 1934, 1938
- Hungarian Cup (4): 1928, 1933, 1935, 1943
- Mitropa Cup (1): 1937

==== International ====
Hungary

- FIFA World Cup runner-up: 1938
- Central European International Cup third place: 1931–32, 1933–35

==== Individual ====
- Nemzeti Bajnokság I: Top scorer 1933–34 with 27 goals

=== Manager ===
Zamalek

- Egypt Cup: 1956–57
