= Yugoslavia national football team results (1946–1969) =

This is a list of the Yugoslavia national football team games between 1946 and 1969.

== Federal People's Republic of Yugoslavia ==
=== 1946 ===
9 May 1946 International friendly	Czechoslovakia	0–2	Yugoslavia	Prague, Czechoslovakia
		Report	Tomašević 52'; Mitić 82'	Stadium: Letná Stadium; Attendance: 50,000; Referee: Mika Popović (Yugoslavia)

29 September 1946 International friendly	Yugoslavia	4–2	Czechoslovakia	Belgrade, Yugoslavia
	Mitić 3'; Matošić 21', 68'; Bobek 80'	Report	Plánický 1'; Klimek 90'	Stadium: JNA Stadium; Attendance: 30,000; Referee: Jan Raskota (Czechoslovakia)

7 October 1946 Balkan Cup	Albania	2–3	Yugoslavia	Tirana, Albania
	Mirashi 6'; Teliti 8'	Report	Matošić 47'; Bobek 48'; Čajkovski 78'	Stadium: Qemal Stafa Stadium; Attendance: 30,000; Referee: Radu Istrate (Romania)

11 October 1946 Balkan Cup	Yugoslavia	1–2	Romania	Tirana, Albania
	Simonovski 42'	Report	Reuter 18'; Fabian 24'	Stadium: Qemal Stafa Stadium; Attendance: 25,000; Referee: Andrey Zlatarev (Bulgaria)

13 October 1946 Balkan Cup	Yugoslavia	2–1	Bulgaria	Tirana, Albania
	Sandić 35', 70'	Report	Laskov 88'	Stadium: Qemal Stafa Stadium; Attendance: 25,000; Referee: Qazim Dervishi (Albania)

=== 1947 ===
11 May 1947 International friendly	Czechoslovakia	3–1	Yugoslavia	Prague, Czechoslovakia
	Bican 23', 85'; Cejp 37'	Report	Bobek 56'	Stadium: Letná Stadium; Attendance: 60,000; Referee: Nikolaj Latyshev (Soviet Union)

22 June 1947 Balkan Cup	Romania	1–3	Yugoslavia	Bucharest, Romania
	Farkaș 43'	Report	Bobek 38', 52'; Jezerkić 40'	Stadium: Stadionul Giulești-Valentin Stănescu; Attendance: 35,000; Referee: Molnár Imre (Hungary)

28 June 1947 Balkan Cup	Yugoslavia	2–3	Hungary	Belgrade, Yugoslavia
	Cimermančić 36'; Mihajlović 62'	Report	Szilágyi 34'; Puskás 57'; Mike 83'	Stadium: JNA Stadium; Attendance: 30,000; Referee: Constantin Iliescu (Romania)

14 September 1947 Balkan Cup	Albania	2–4	Yugoslavia	Tirana, Albania
	Boriçi 12'; Parapani 64'	Report	Bobek 21'; Krnić 27'; Mitić 30'; Cimermančić 42'	Stadium: Qemal Stafa Stadium; Attendance: 30,000; Referee: Viktor Vrhovac (Yugoslavia)

12 October 1947 Balkan Cup	Yugoslavia	2–1	Bulgaria	Zagreb, Yugoslavia
	Mihajlović 18', 43'	Report	Stankov 12'	Stadium: NK Zagreb Stadium; Attendance: 15,000; Referee: Béla Varga (Hungary)

19 October 1947 International friendly	Yugoslavia	7–1	Poland	Belgrade, Yugoslavia
	Jezerkić 4', 21', 23', 28'; Bobek 10', 38'; Mitić 11'	Report	Cieślik 76'	Stadium: JNA Stadium; Attendance: 25,000; Referee: Constantin Iliescu (Romania)

=== 1948 ===
27 June 1948 Balkan Cup	Yugoslavia	0–0	Albania	Belgrade, Yugoslavia
		Report		Stadium: JNA Stadium; Attendance: 25,000; Referee: Nikola Gelev (Bulgaria)

4 July 1948 Balkan Cup	Bulgaria	1–3	Yugoslavia	Sofia, Bulgaria
	Argirov 32'	Report	Wölfl 41'; Mitić 54'; Že. Čajkovski 72'	Stadium: Yunak Stadium; Attendance: 30,000; Referee: Constantin Iliescu (Romania)

31 July 1948 1948 Summer Olympics First round	Yugoslavia	6–1	Luxembourg	London, England
	Stanković 57'; Mihajlović 61'; Že. Čajkovski 65', 70'; Mitić 74'; Bobek 87'	Report	Schammel 10'	Stadium: Craven Cottage; Attendance: 7,000; Referee: Karel van der Meer (Netherlands)

5 August 1948 1948 Summer Olympics Quarter-finals	Yugoslavia	3–1	Turkey	London, England
	Že. Čajkovski 21'; Bobek 47'; Wölfl 83'	Report	Gulesin 36'	Stadium: Lynn Road; Attendance: 8,000; Referee: Victor Sdez (France)

11 August 1948 1948 Summer Olympics Semi-finals	Great Britain	1–3	Yugoslavia	London, England
	Donovan 20'	Report	Bobek 19'; Wölfl 24'; Mitić 48'	Stadium: Empire Stadium; Attendance: 40,000; Referee: Karel van der Meer (Netherlands)

13 August 1948 1948 Summer Olympics Final	Sweden	3–1	Yugoslavia	London, England
	Gren 24', 67' (pen.); G. Nordahl 48'	Report	Bobek 42'	Stadium: Empire Stadium; Attendance: 60,000; Referee: William Ling (England)

25 August 1948 International friendly	Poland	0–1	Yugoslavia	Warsaw, Poland
		Report	Mitić 24'	Stadium: Stadion Wojska Polskiego; Attendance: 38,000; Referee: Josef Nemčovský (Czechoslovakia)

=== 1949 ===
19 June 1949 International friendly	Norway	1–3	Yugoslavia	Oslo, Norway
	Bredesen 60'	Report	Mitić 76'; Bobek 84'; Zl. Čajkovski 88'	Stadium: Ullevaal Stadion; Attendance: 23,163; Referee: Klaas Schipper (Netherlands)

21 August 1949 1950 FIFA World Cup qualification First round	Yugoslavia	6–0	Israel	Belgrade, Yugoslavia
	Pajević 12', 19', 26'; Senčar 44'; Že. Čajkovski 63'; Bobek 83' (pen.)	Report		Stadium: JNA Stadium; Attendance: 35,000; Referee: Giovanni Galeati (Italy)

18 September 1949 1950 FIFA World Cup qualification First round	Israel	2–5	Yugoslavia	Tel Aviv, Israel
	Glazer 46', 78'	Report	Valok 15', 37'; Bobek 26'; Zl. Čajkovski 61'; Že. Čajkovski 75'	Stadium: Maccabiah Stadium; Attendance: 25,000; Referee: Yosef Kinstlich (Cyprus)

9 October 1949 1950 FIFA World Cup qualification Final round	Yugoslavia	1–1	France	Belgrade, Yugoslavia
	Že. Čajkovski 36'	Report	Baillot 55'	Stadium: JNA Stadium; Attendance: 50,000; Referee: Karel van der Meer (Netherlands)

30 October 1949 1950 FIFA World Cup qualification Final round	France	1–1	Yugoslavia	Paris, France
	Baillot 9'	Report	Bobek 44'	Stadium: Stade Olympique de Colombes; Attendance: 53,569; Referee: Giovanni Galeati (Italy)

13 November 1949 International friendly	Yugoslavia	2–5	Austria	Belgrade, Yugoslavia
	Že. Čajkovski 35'; Bobek 59'	Report	Huber 23', 38'; Decker 29', 70', 73'	Stadium: JNA Stadium; Attendance: 50,000; Referee: Agostino Gamba (Italy)

11 December 1949 1950 FIFA World Cup qualification Final round	Yugoslavia	3–2	France	Florence, Italy
	Mihajlović 12', 84' (pen.); Že. Čajkovski 114'	Report	Walter 13'; Luciano 83'	Stadium: Stadio Giovanni Berta; Attendance: 25,000; Referee: Giovanni Galeati (Italy)

=== 1950 ===
28 May 1950 International friendly	Yugoslavia	5–1	Denmark	Belgrade, Yugoslavia
	Vukas 34'; Hočevar 35'; Mitić 54', 56', 86'	Report	Pilmark 45'	Stadium: JNA Stadium; Attendance: 50,000; Referee: Genoroso Datillo (Italy)

11 June 1950 International friendly	Switzerland	0–4	Yugoslavia	Bern, Switzerland
		Report	Že. Čajkovski 14'; Tomašević 23'; Bobek 39'; Atanacković 89'	Stadium: Wankdorf Stadium; Attendance: 16,000; Referee: Luis Andre Baert (Belgium)

25 June 1950 1950 FIFA World Cup Group 1	Yugoslavia	3–0	Switzerland	Belo Horizonte, Brazil
	Mitić 59'; Tomašević 70'; Ognjanov 84'	Report		Stadium: Estádio Independência; Attendance: 7,336; Referee: Giovanni Galeati (Italy)

29 June 1950 1950 FIFA World Cup Group 1	Yugoslavia	4–1	Mexico	Porto Alegre, Brazil
	Bobek 20'; Že. Čajkovski 23', 51'; Tomašević 81'	Report	Ortiz 89' (pen.)	Stadium: Estádio dos Eucaliptos; Attendance: 11,078; Referee: Reginald Leafe (England)

1 July 1950 1950 FIFA World Cup Group 1	Brazil	2–0	Yugoslavia	Rio de Janeiro, Brazil
	Ademir 4'; Zizinho 69'	Report		Stadium: Estádio do Maracanã; Attendance: 142,429; Referee: Benjamin Griffiths (Wales)

3 September 1950 International friendly	Sweden	1–2	Yugoslavia	Stockholm, Sweden
	Lindskog 8'	Report	Valok 13'; Herceg 27'	Stadium: Råsunda Stadium; Attendance: 37,677; Referee: Reginald Leafe (England)

7 September 1950 International friendly	Finland	3–2	Yugoslavia	Helsinki, Finland
	Vaihela 23'; Asikainen 50'; Lehtovirta 66'	Report	Bobek 14'; Vukas 20'	Stadium: Helsinki Olympic Stadium; Attendance: 16,897; Referee: John Erik Andersson (Sweden)

10 September 1950 International friendly	Denmark	1–4	Yugoslavia	Copenhagen, Denmark
	Hasen 11' (pen.)	Report	Živanović 6'; Bobek 10'; Mitić 33'; Herceg 64'	Stadium: Københavns Idrætspark; Attendance: 37,000; Referee: Folke Bålstad (Norway)

8 October 1950 International friendly	Austria	7–2	Yugoslavia	Vienna, Austria
	Decker 3'; Stojaspal 21', 68'; Wagner 25'; Aurednik 50'; Melchior 56', 87'	Report	Mitić 34'; Živanović 74'	Stadium: Praterstadion; Attendance: 60,000; Referee: Jean Lutz (Switzerland)

5 November 1950 International friendly	Yugoslavia	4–0	Norway	Belgrade, Yugoslavia
	Ognjanov 35', 46'; Mitić 40'; Rupnik 45'	Report		Stadium: JNA Stadium; Attendance: 45,000; Referee: Klaas Schipper (Netherlands)

22 November 1950 International friendly	England	2–2	Yugoslavia	London, England
	Lofthouse 29', 34'	Report	Compton 40' (o.g.); Živanović 72'	Stadium: Highbury; Attendance: 62,000; Referee: Karel van der Meer (Netherlands)

=== 1951 ===
2 February 1951 International friendly	France	2–1	Yugoslavia	Paris, France
	Strappe 4'; Flamion 62'	Report	Tomašević 14'	Stadium: Parc des Princes; Attendance: 33,534; Referee: Laurent Franken (Belgium)

6 May 1951 International friendly	Italy	0–0	Yugoslavia	Milan, Italy
		Report		Stadium: San Siro; Attendance: 50,000; Referee: Jean Lutz (Sweden)

24 June 1951 International friendly	Yugoslavia	7–3	Switzerland	Belgrade, Yugoslavia
	Bobek 14', 40'; Mitić 4', 48'; Zebec 5', 37'; Rajkov 35'	Report	Bickel 43'; Ballaman 52', 80'	Stadium: JNA Stadium; Attendance: 50,000; Referee: Alois Beranek (Austria)

23 August 1951 International friendly	Norway	2–4	Yugoslavia	Oslo, Norway
	Dybwad 33', 57'	Report	Vukas 8'; Bobek 23', 30'; Zebec 27'	Stadium: Ullevaal Stadion; Attendance: 30,867; Referee: Aksel Asmussen (Denmark)

2 September 1951 International friendly	Yugoslavia	2–1	Sweden	Belgrade, Yugoslavia
	Bobek 19'; Ognjanov 74'	Report	Rydell 2'	Stadium: JNA Stadium; Attendance: 50,000; Referee: Luis Andre Baert (Belgium)

=== 1952 ===
25 June 1952 International friendly	Yugoslavia	4–1	Norway	Zagreb, Yugoslavia
	Vukas 8', 10'; Mitić 18'; Zebec 59'	Report	Sagvaag 19'	Stadium: Stadion Maksimir; Attendance: 30,000; Referee: Eugenio Scherz (Switzerland)

15 July 1952 1952 Summer Olympics	Yugoslavia	10–1	India	Helsinki, Finland
	Vukas 2', 62'; Mitić 14', 63'; Zebec 17', 23', 60', 87'; Ognjanov 52', 67'	Report	Khan 89'	Stadium: Töölön Pallokenttä; Attendance: 10,000; Referee: John Best (United States)

20 July 1952 1952 Summer Olympics	Yugoslavia	5–5	Soviet Union	Tampere, Finland
	Mitić 29'; Ognjanov 33'; Zebec 44', 59'; Bobek 29'	Report	Bobrov 53', 77', 87'; Trofimov 75'; Petrov 89'	Stadium: Ratina Stadion; Attendance: 17,000; Referee: Arthur Ellis (England)

22 July 1952 1952 Summer Olympics	Yugoslavia	3–1	Soviet Union	Tampere, Finland
	Mitić 19'; Bobek 29' (pen.); Čajkovski 54'	Report	Bobrov 6'	Stadium: Ratina Stadion; Attendance: 16,916; Referee: Arthur Ellis (England)

25 July 1952 1952 Summer Olympics	Yugoslavia	5–3	Denmark	Helsinki, Finland
	Čajkovski 19'; Ognjanov 35'; Vukas 41'; Bobek 78'; Zebec 81'	Report	Lundberg 63'; Seebach 85'; Hansen 87'	Stadium: Töölön Pallokenttä; Attendance: 11,496; Referee: Waldemar Karni (Finland)

29 July 1952 1952 Summer Olympics	Yugoslavia	3–1	Germany	Helsinki, Finland
	Mitić 3', 24'; Čajkovski 30'	Report	Stollenwerk 12'	Stadium: Olympic Stadium; Attendance: 25,821; Referee: Wolf Waldemar Karni (Finland)

2 August 1952 1952 Summer Olympics	Hungary	2–0	Yugoslavia	Helsinki, Finland
	Puskás 70'; Czibor 88'	Report		Stadium: Olympic Stadium; Attendance: 58,553; Referee: Arthur Ellis (England)

21 September 1952 International friendly	Yugoslavia	4–2	Austria	Belgrade, Yugoslavia
	Bobek 14', 50', 8', 87' (pen.); Vukas 55' (pen.)	Report	Körner 61'; Cejka 74'	Stadium: JNA Stadion; Attendance: 50,000; Referee: William H. Evans (England)

2 November 1952 International friendly	Yugoslavia	5–0	Egypt	Belgrade, Yugoslavia
	Rajkov 8'; Cokic 45'; Vukas 70'; Jocic 75', 81'	Report		Stadium: JNA Stadion; Attendance: 30,000; Referee: Erich Steiner (Austria)

21 December 1952 International friendly	West Germany	3–2	Yugoslavia	Ludwigshafen, West Germany
	Walter 2'; Morlock 44'; Rahn 70'	Report	Čajkovski 40'; Bobek 42' (pen.)	Stadium: Südweststadion; Attendance: 70,000; Referee: Arthur Ellis (England)

=== 1953 ===
6 January 1953 International friendly	Egypt	1–3	Yugoslavia	Cairo, Egypt
	El-Dhizui 38'	Report	Vukas 20', 80'; Mitić 74'	Stadium: FC National Stadium; Attendance: 25,000; Referee: Reginald Leafe (England)

9 May 1953 1954 FIFA World Cup qualification Group 10	Yugoslavia	1–0	Greece	Belgrade, Yugoslavia
	Matošić 21'	Report		Stadium: JNA Stadium; Attendance: 50,000; Referee: Erich Steiner (Austria)

14 May 1953 International friendly	Belgium	1–3	Yugoslavia	Brussels, Belgium
	Anoul 88'	Report	Vukas 10', 43'; Rajkov 21'	Stadium: Heysel Stadium; Attendance: 39,435; Referee: Emil Schmetzer (Germany)

21 May 1953 International friendly	Yugoslavia	5–2	Wales	Belgrade, Yugoslavia
	Mitić 10', 14', 24'; Vukas 15'; Rajkov 55'	Report	Ford 36', 52'	Stadium: JNA Stadion; Attendance: 50,000; Referee: John Best (United States)

5 June 1953 International friendly	Turkey	2–2	Yugoslavia	Istanbul, Turkey
	Sargın 60'; Kırcan 74'	Report	Rajkov 31'; Mitić 88'	Stadium: Mithatpaşa Stadium; Attendance: 22,467; Referee: Kostas Tsitsis (Greece)

18 October 1953 International friendly	Yugoslavia	3–1	France	Zagreb, Yugoslavia
	Veselinović 47'; Rajkov 55'; Dvornić 61'	Report	Marcel 44'	Stadium: Stadion Maksimir; Attendance: 45,000; Referee: Erich Steiner (Austria)

8 November 1953 1954 FIFA World Cup qualification Group 10	Yugoslavia	1–0	Israel	Skopje, Yugoslavia
	Milutinović 2'	Report		Stadium: Gradski Stadion Skopje; Attendance: 25,000; Referee: Albert Alsteen (Belgium)

=== 1954 ===
21 March 1954 1954 FIFA World Cup qualification Group 10	Israel	0–1	Yugoslavia	Ramat Gan, Israel
		Report	Zebec 80'	Stadium: Ramat Gan Stadium; Attendance: 50,000; Referee: Reginald Leafe (England)

28 March 1954 1954 FIFA World Cup qualification Group 10	Greece	0–1	Yugoslavia	Athens, Greece
		Report	Veselinović 51'	Stadium: Leoforos Alexandras Stadium; Attendance: 25,000; Referee: Wilhelm Rufli (Switzerland)

9 May 1954 International friendly	Yugoslavia	0–2	Belgium	Zagreb, Yugoslavia
		Report	Coppens 43'; Mermans 55'	Stadium: Stadion Maksimir; Attendance: 35,000; Referee: Erich Steiner (Austria)

16 May 1954 International friendly	Yugoslavia	1–0	England	Belgrade, Yugoslavia
	Mitić 88'	Report		Stadium: JNA Stadion; Attendance: 50,000; Referee: Erich Steiner (Austria)

16 June 1954 1954 FIFA World Cup Group 1	Yugoslavia	1–0	France	Lausanne, Switzerland
	Milutinović 15'	Report		Stadium: Stade Olympique de la Pontaise; Attendance: 16,000; Referee: Benjamin Griffiths (Wales)

19 June 1954 1954 FIFA World Cup Group 1	Brazil	1–1 (a.e.t.)	Yugoslavia	Lausanne, Switzerland
	Zebec 48'	Report	Didi 69'	Stadium: Stade Olympique de la Pontaise; Attendance: 24,637; Referee: Charlie Faultless (Scotland)

27 June 1954 1954 FIFA World Cup Quarter-finals	West Germany	2–0	Yugoslavia	Geneva, Switzerland
	Horvat 2' (o.g.); Rahn 85'	Report		Stadium: Charmilles Stadium; Attendance: 17,000; Referee: Istvan Zsolt (Hungary)

22 September 1954 International friendly	Wales	1–3	Yugoslavia	Cardiff, Wales
	Allchurch 56'	Report	Veselinović 62', 77' (pen.), 89'	Stadium: Ninian Park; Attendance: 45,000; Referee: Leopold Horn (Netherlands)

26 September 1954 International friendly	Saar	1–5	Yugoslavia	Saarbrücken, West Germany
	Emse 17'	Report	Vukas 5', 71', 84'; Bobek 56'; Veselinović 59'	Stadium: Ludwigsparkstadion; Attendance: 25,000; Referee: Alois Smidts (Belgium)

3 October 1954 International friendly	Austria	2–2	Yugoslavia	Vienna, Austria
	Wagner 3'; Haummer 50'	Report	Stanković 18'; Bobek 31'	Stadium: Praterstadion; Attendance: 60,000; Referee: Leopold Horn (Netherlands)

17 October 1954 International friendly	Yugoslavia	5–1	Turkey	Sarajevo, Yugoslavia
	Bobek 40', 41', 71'; Pašić 47'; Marković 78'	Report	Sargın 85'	Stadium: Stadion Koševo; Attendance: 40,000; Referee: Friedrich Seipelt (Austria)

=== 1955 ===
5 May 1955 International friendly	Yugoslavia	2–2	Scotland	Belgrade, Yugoslavia
	Veselinović 13'; Vukas 38'	Report	Reilly 29'; Smith 40'	Stadium: JNA Stadium; Attendance: 20,000; Referee: Vincenzo Orlandini (Italy)

29 May 1955 1955–60 Central European International Cup	Italy	0–4	Yugoslavia	Turin, Italy
		Report	Veselinović 48'; Zebec 65'; Bergamaschi 81' (o.g.); Vukas 82'	Stadium: Stadio Comunale; Attendance: 65,000; Referee: Erich Steiner (Austria)

26 June 1955 1955–60 Central European International Cup	Yugoslavia	0–0	Switzerland	Belgrade, Yugoslavia
		Report		Stadium: JNA Stadium; Attendance: 40,000; Referee: Istvan Zsolt (Hungary)

25 September 1955 International friendly	Yugoslavia	3–1	West Germany	Belgrade, Yugoslavia
	Milutinović 31'; Rajkov 36'; Veselinović 83'	Report	Morlock 89'	Stadium: JNA Stadium; Attendance: 50,000; Referee: Istvan Zsolt (Hungary)

19 October 1955 International friendly	Republic of Ireland	1–4	Yugoslavia	Dublin, Ireland
	Fitzsimons 33'	Report	Milutinović 10', 14', 44'; Veselinović 77'	Stadium: Dalymount Park; Attendance: 30,000; Referee: Archie Murdoch (England)

30 October 1955 1955–60 Central European International Cup	Austria	2–1	Yugoslavia	Vienna, Austria
	Grohs 17'; Hanappi 47'	Report	Milutinović 26'	Stadium: Praterstadion; Attendance: 60,000; Referee: Francesco Liverani (Italy)

11 November 1955 International friendly	France	1–1	Yugoslavia	Paris, France
	Piantoni 88'	Report	Veselinović 25'	Stadium: Stade Colombes; Attendance: 60,654; Referee: Vincenzo Orlandini (Italy)

=== 1956 ===
22 April 1956 International friendly	Yugoslavia	0–1	Romania	Belgrade, Yugoslavia
			Cacoveanu 84'	Stadium: JNA Stadium; Attendance: 45,000; Referee: Giorgio Bernardi (Italy)

29 April 1956 1955–60 Central European International Cup	Hungary	2–2	Yugoslavia	Budapest, Hungary
	Fenyvesi 43'; Bozsik 55'		Vukas 5'; Veselinović 76'	Stadium: Népstadion; Attendance: 110,000; Referee: Lucien Van Nuffel (Belgium)

17 June 1956 1955–60 Central European International Cup	Yugoslavia	1–1	Austria	Zagreb, Yugoslavia
	Rajkov 60'		Koller 55'	Stadium: Stadion Maksimir; Attendance: 30,000; Referee: Sándor Harangozó (Hungary)

9 September 1956 International friendly	Yugoslavia	4–2	Indonesia	Belgrade, Yugoslavia
	Milutinović 35', 38', 68'; Kostić 85'		Stanković 89' (o.g.); Danu 89'	Stadium: JNA Stadium; Attendance: 25,000; Referee: Yordan Takov (Bulgaria)

16 September 1956 1955–60 Central European International Cup	Yugoslavia	1–3	Hungary	Belgrade, Yugoslavia
	Petaković 7'		Czibor 5'; Koscis 27'; Puskás 56'	Stadium: JNA Stadium; Attendance: 50,000; Referee: Friedrich Seipelt (Austria)

30 September 1956 1955–60 Central European International Cup	Yugoslavia	1–2	Czechoslovakia	Belgrade, Yugoslavia
	Stanković 66'		Přáda 42', 60'	Stadium: JNA Stadium; Attendance: 50,000; Referee: Friedrich Mayer (Austria)

21 November 1956 International friendly	Scotland	2–0	Yugoslavia	Glasgow, Scotland
	Mudie 35'; Baird 52'			Stadium: Hampden Park; Attendance: 55,521; Referee: Pieter Roomer (Netherlands)

28 November 1956 International friendly	England	3–0	Yugoslavia	London, England
	Brooks 12'			Stadium: Wembley Stadium; Attendance: 75,000; Referee: Édouard Harzic (France)

28 November 1956 1956 Summer Olympics Quarterfinals	Yugoslavia	9–1	United States	Melbourne, Australia
	Veselinović 10', 84', 90'; Antić 12', 73'; Mujić 16', 35', 56'; Papec 20'		Zerhusen 42'	Stadium: Olympic Park Stadium; Attendance: 5,292; Referee: Maurice Swain (New Zealand)

4 December 1956 1956 Summer Olympics Semifinals	Yugoslavia	4–1	India	Melbourne, Australia
	Papec 54', 65'; Veselinović 57'; Salam 78' (o.g.)		D'Souza 52'	Stadium: Melbourne Cricket Ground; Attendance: 16,626; Referee: Nikolay Latyshev (Soviet Union)

4 December 1956 1956 Summer Olympics Finals	Soviet Union	1–0	Yugoslavia	Melbourne, Australia
	Ilyin 48'			Stadium: Melbourne Cricket Ground; Attendance: 86,716; Referee: Ron Wright (Australia)

23 December 1956 International friendly	Indonesia	1–5	Yugoslavia	Jakarta, Indonesia
	Hou 53' (pen.)		Lipošinović 16'; Veselinović 40', 48'; Radović 69'; Papec 89'	Stadium: Senejan; Attendance: 40,000; Referee: Ch. H. Vensveen (Indonesia)

=== 1957 ===
5 May 1957 1958 FIFA World Cup qualification	Greece	0–0	Yugoslavia	Athens, Greece
				Stadium: Leoforos Alexandras Stadium; Attendance: 25,000; Referee: Jacques Devillers (France)

12 May 1957 1955–60 Central European International Cup	Yugoslavia	6–1	Italy	Zagreb, Yugoslavia
	Zebec 10'; Milutinović 27', 48'; Lipošinović 40'; Rajkov 50'; Vukas 81'		Cervato 57' (pen.)	Stadium: Stadion Maksimir; Attendance: 45,000; Referee: Martin Macko (Soviet Union)

18 May 1957 1955–60 Central European International Cup	Czechoslovakia	1–0	Yugoslavia	Bratislava, Czechoslovakia
	Borovička 57'			Stadium: Tehelné pole Attendance: 45,000; Referee: Vasilis Diamantopoulos (Greece)

15 September 1957 International friendly	Yugoslavia	3–3	Austria	Belgrade, Yugoslavia
	Rajkov 15'; Koller 28' (o.g.); Milutinović 70'		Happel 36' (pen.); Dienst 45', 62'	Stadium: JNA Stadium; Attendance: 50,000; Referee: Vincenzo Orlandini (Italy)

29 September 1957 1958 FIFA World Cup qualification	Romania	1–1	Yugoslavia	Bucharest, Romania
	A. Ene 70'		Mujić 52'	Stadium: Stadionul Național; Attendance: 68,758; Referee: Alfred Grill (Austria)

10 November 1957 1958 FIFA World Cup qualification	Yugoslavia	4–1	Greece	Belgrade, Yugoslavia
	Mujić 6', 61'; Krstić 9'; Petaković 67'		Nestoridis 28'	Stadium: JNA Stadium; Attendance: 45,000; Referee: Cesare Jonni (Italy)

17 November 1957 1958 FIFA World Cup qualification	Yugoslavia	2–0	Romania	Belgrade, Yugoslavia
	Milutinović 53', 80'			Stadium: JNA Stadium; Attendance: 55,000; Referee: Fridriech Seipelt (Austria)

=== 1958 ===
4 April 1958 International friendly	Hungary	2–0	Yugoslavia	Budapest, Hungary
	Sándor 15'; Vasas 56'			Stadium: Népstadion; Attendance: 100,000; Referee: Lucien Van Nuffel (Belgium)

11 May 1958 International friendly	Yugoslavia	5–0	England	Belgrade, Yugoslavia
	Milutinović 23'; Petaković 56', 77', 83'; Veselinović 86'			Stadium: JNA Stadium; Attendance: 55,000; Referee: István Zsolt (Hungary)

8 June 1958 1958 FIFA World Cup Group 2	Yugoslavia	1–1	Scotland	Västerås, Sweden
	Petaković 6'		Murray 6'	Stadium: Arosvallen; Attendance: 9,591; Referee: Raymond Wyssling (Switzerland)

11 June 1958 1958 FIFA World Cup Group 2	Yugoslavia	3–2	France	Västerås, Sweden
	Petaković 16'; Veselinović 63', 88'		Fontaine 4', 85'	Stadium: Arosvallen; Attendance: 12,217; Referee: Benjamin Griffiths (Wales)

15 June 1958 1958 FIFA World Cup Group 2	Paraguay	3–3	Yugoslavia	Tunavallen, Sweden
	Parodi 20', 80'; Aguero 51'		Ognjanović 11'; Veselinović 28'; Rajkov 73'	Stadium: Arosvallen; Attendance: 13,103; Referee: Martin Macko (Czechoslovakia)

19 June 1958 1958 FIFA World Cup Quarter-finals	West Germany	1–0	Yugoslavia	Tunavallen, Sweden
	Rahn 12'			Stadium: Arosvallen; Attendance: 13,103; Referee: Raymond Wyssling (Switzerland)

14 September 1958 International friendly	Austria	3–4	Yugoslavia	Vienna, Austria
	Happel 7'; Ninaus 18'; Körner 25'		Veselinović 31', 66', 70'; Mujić 61'	Stadium: Praterstadion; Attendance: 65,000; Referee: Louis Fauquemberghe (France)

5 October 1958 International friendly	Yugoslavia	4–4	Hungary	Zagreb, Yugoslavia
	Zebec 11', 76'; Petaković 54'; Veselinović 65'		Sándor 15', 70', 79'; Göröcs 78'	Stadium: Stadion Maksimir; Attendance: 40,000; Referee: Francesco Liverani (Italy)

=== 1959 ===
19 April 1959 International friendly	Hungary	4–0	Yugoslavia	Budapest, Hungary
	Sándor 38'; Tichy 53', 68'; Pal 87'			Stadium: Népstadion; Attendance: 100,000; Referee: Giulio Campanati (Italy)

26 April 1959 1955–60 Central European International Cup	Switzerland	1–5	Yugoslavia	Basel, Switzerland
	Rey 58'		Kostić 6'; Šekularac 41', 48'; Veselinović 82', 86'	Stadium: St. Jakob Stadium; Attendance: 37,000; Referee: Cesare Jonny (Italy)

31 May 1959 1960 European Nations' Cup qualifying Round of 16	Yugoslavia	2–0	Bulgaria	Belgrade, Yugoslavia
	Galić 1'; Tasić 87'			Stadium: JNA Stadium; Attendance: 23,418; Referee: Mihai Popa (Romania)

11 October 1959 International friendly	Yugoslavia	2–4	Hungary	Belgrade, Yugoslavia
	Mujić 12'; Kostić 15'		Albert 4', 34', 69'; Bundzsák 82'	Stadium: JNA Stadium; Attendance: 55,000; Referee: Cesare Jonny (Italy)

21 October 1959 1960 Summer Olympics qualifying	Israel	2–2	Yugoslavia	Ramat Gan, Israel
	Stelmach 69', 74'		Kostić 6', 75'	Stadium: Ramat Gan Stadium; Attendance: 40,000; Referee: Orhan Gönül (Turkey)

25 October 1959 1960 European Nations' Cup qualifying Round of 16	Bulgaria	1–1	Yugoslavia	Sofia, Bulgaria
	Diev 55'		Mujić 57'	Stadium: Vasil Levski National Stadium; Attendance: 27,560; Referee: Kurt Tschenscher (Germany)

15 November 1959 1960 Summer Olympics qualifying	Yugoslavia	4–0	Greece	Belgrade, Yugoslavia
	Mujić 31', 43'; Mihajlović 45'; Kostić 78'			Stadium: JNA Stadium; Attendance: 25,000; Referee: Victor Schicker (Switzerland)

20 December 1959 International friendly	West Germany	1–1	Yugoslavia	Hannover, West Germany
	Schmidt 72'		Mujić 5'	Stadium: Niedersachsenstadion; Attendance: 83,000; Referee: Johan Martens (Netherlands)

=== 1960 ===
1 January 1960 International friendly	Morocco	0–5	Yugoslavia	Casablanca, Morocco
			Mihajlović 27'; Kostić 38', 57' (pen.); Maravić 65'; Anković 78'	Stadium: Stade d`Honneur; Attendance: 7,000; Referee: Hermínio Soares (Portugal)

3 January 1960 International friendly	Tunisia	1–5	Yugoslavia	Tunis, Tunisia
	Tiemcani 58'		Kostić 25'; Knez 28'; Maravić 35'; Mihajlović 81'; Čebinac 83'	Stadium: Stade Municipal Géo-André; Attendance: 10,000; Referee: Francesco Liverani (Italy)

8 January 1960 International friendly	Egypt	0–1	Yugoslavia	Cairo, Egypt
			Mihajlović 81'	Stadium: Al Zamalek Stadium; Attendance: 35,000; Referee: Cesare Jonny (Italy)

10 April 1960 1960 Summer Olympics qualifying	Yugoslavia	1–2	Israel	Belgrade, Yugoslavia
	Mujić 33'		Levi 2', 73'	Stadium: JNA Stadium; Attendance: 30,000; Referee: Friedrich Seipelt (Austria)

24 April 1960 1960 Summer Olympics qualifying	Greece	0–5	Yugoslavia	Athens, Greece
			Kostić 36'; Žanetić 67'; Takač 69'; Galić 81'; Knez 83'	Stadium: Leoforos Alexandras Stadium; Attendance: 25,000; Referee: Dimitar Rumenchev (Bulgaria)

8 May 1960 1960 European Nations' Cup qualifying Round of 16	Portugal	2–1	Yugoslavia	Lisbon, Portugal
	Santana 30'; Matateu 70'		Kostić 81'	Stadium: Estádio Nacional; Attendance: 39,978; Referee: Joseph Barbéran (France)

11 May 1960 International friendly	England	3–3	Yugoslavia	London, England
	Douglas 42'; Greaves 48'; Haynes 88'		Galić 27', 58'; Kostić 80'	Stadium: Wembley Stadium; Attendance: 70,000; Referee: Robert Davidson (Scotland)

22 May 1960 1960 European Nations' Cup qualifying Round of 16	Yugoslavia	5–1	Portugal	Belgrade, Yugoslavia
	Šekularac 9'; Čebinac 45'; Kostić 50', 68'; Galić 80'		Cavém 30'	Stadium: JNA Stadium; Attendance: 43,000; Referee: Josef Stoll (Austria)

6 July 1960 1960 European Nations' Cup Semi-finals	France	4–5	Yugoslavia	Paris, France
	Vincent 12'; Heutte 43', 62'; Wysnieski 53'		Galić 11'; Žanetić 55'; Knez 75'; Jerković 78', 79'	Stadium: Parc des Princes; Attendance: 26,370; Referee: Gaston Grandain (Belgium)

10 July 1960 1960 European Nations' Cup Final	Soviet Union	2–1 (a.e.t.)	Yugoslavia	Paris, France
	Metreveli 49'; Ponedelnik 113'		Galić 43'	Stadium: Parc des Princes; Attendance: 17,966; Referee: Arthur Ellis (England)

6 August 1960 International friendly	Yugoslavia	7–0	Tunisia	Belgrade, Yugoslavia
	Knez 2', 13', 49'; Kostić 26', 39'; Galić 28'; Maravić 48'			Stadium: JNA Stadium; Attendance: 15,000; Referee: Živko Bajić (Yugoslavia)

26 August 1960 1960 Summer Olympics Group A	Yugoslavia	6–1	Egypt	Grosseto, Italy
	Rifai 3' (o.g.); Galić 30' (pen.); Kostić 32', 61', 63'; Knez 49'		Attia 72'	Stadium: Stadio Olimpico Comunale; Attendance: 10,000; Referee: Cesare Jonni (Italy)

29 August 1960 1960 Summer Olympics Group A	Yugoslavia	4–0	Turkey	Florence, Italy
	Kostić 10', 89'; Galić 46'; Knez 61'			Stadium: Stadio Comunale; Attendance: 1,858; Referee: Vincenzo Orlandini (Italy)

1 September 1960 1960 Summer Olympics Group A	Yugoslavia	3–3	Bulgaria	Rome, Italy
	Galić 50', 57', 69'		Kovachev 59'; Debarski 81', 89'	Stadium: Stadio Flaminio; Attendance: 15,000; Referee: Cesare Jonni (Italy)

5 September 1960 1960 Summer Olympics Semi-finals	Italy	1–1 (a.e.t.)	Yugoslavia	Naples, Italy
	Tumburas 109'		Galić 107'	Stadium: Stadio San Paolo; Attendance: 16,568; Referee: Josef Kandlbinder (Germany)

10 September 1960 1960 Summer Olympics Final	Yugoslavia	3–1	Denmark	Rome, Italy
	Galić 1'; Matuš 11'; Kostić 69'		Nielsen 90'	Stadium: Stadio Flaminio; Attendance: 23,042; Referee: Concitto Lo Bello (Italy)

9 October 1960 International friendly	Hungary	1–1	Yugoslavia	Budapest, Hungary
	Göröcs 10'		Kostić 70'	Stadium: Népstadion; Attendance: 70,000; Referee: Friedrich Seipelt (Austria)

=== 1961 ===
7 May 1961 International friendly	Yugoslavia	2–4	Hungary	Belgrade, Yugoslavia
	Kostic 16'; Matuš 16'		Albert 4'; Zebec 13' (o.g.); Tichy 55', 80'	Stadium: JNA Stadium; Attendance: 50,000; Referee: Gino Rigato (Italy)

4 June 1961 1962 FIFA World Cup qualification	Yugoslavia	2–1	Poland	Belgrade, Yugoslavia
	Kaloperović 42' (pen.); Kostic 49'; Matuš 16'		Brychczy 65'	Stadium: JNA Stadium; Attendance: 30,000; Referee: Dimosthenis Stathatos (Greece)

18 June 1961 International friendly	Yugoslavia	3–2	Morocco	Belgrade, Yugoslavia
	Mujić 47', 50'; Matuš 79'		Mustafa 20'; Ali 39'	Stadium: JNA Stadium; Attendance: 20,000; Referee: Petar Dzhonev (Bulgaria)

25 June 1961 1962 FIFA World Cup qualification	Poland	1–1	Yugoslavia	Chorzów, Poland
	Schmidt 29'		Galić 1'	Stadium: Stadion Śląski; Attendance: 57,000; Referee: Václav Korelus (Czechoslovakia)

8 October 1961 1962 FIFA World Cup qualification	Yugoslavia	5–1	South Korea	Belgrade, Yugoslavia
	Čebinac 42'; Šekularac 54', 70'; Radaković 67'; Galić 89'		Chug Sun-cheon 82'	Stadium: JNA Stadium; Attendance: 20,000; Referee: Konstantinos Ioannidis (Greece)

19 November 1961 International friendly	Yugoslavia	2–1	Austria	Zagreb, Yugoslavia
	Jerković 2', 75'		Nemec 29'	Stadium: Stadion Maksimir; Attendance: 45,000; Referee: János Pósa (Hungary)

26 November 1961 1962 FIFA World Cup qualification	South Korea	1–3	Yugoslavia	Seoul, South Korea
	Yoo Pan-sun 61'		Galić 17', 27'; Jerković 89'	Stadium: Hyochang Stadium; Attendance: 25,000; Referee: Mak Xeun Fei (Hong Kong)

29 November 1961 International friendly	Japan	0–1	Yugoslavia	Tokyo, Japan
			Čebinac 75'	Stadium: National Olympic Stadium; Attendance: 19,000; Referee: Yozo Yokoyama (Japan)

2 December 1961 International friendly	Hong Kong	1–2	Yugoslavia	Hong Kong, China
	Kwok Mun Won 89'		Mujić 40'; Bego 60'	Stadium: Government Stadium; Attendance: 30,000; Referee: Tat Sun Luk (Hong Kong)

7 December 1961 International friendly	Indonesia	1–5	Yugoslavia	Jakarta, Indonesia
	Hipy 27'		Radaković 34'; Galić 53'; Šekularac 56'; Mujić 58'; Bego 82'	Stadium: Gelora Senayan Main Stadium; Attendance: 35,000; Referee: Chris Wensveen (Indonesia)

14 December 1961 International friendly	Israel	0–2	Yugoslavia	Ramat Gan, Israel
			Galić 35', 53'	Stadium: Ramat Gan Stadium; Attendance: 25,000; Referee: Giuseppe Adami (Italy)

=== 1962 ===
16 May 1962 International friendly	Yugoslavia	3–1	East Germany	Belgrade, Yugoslavia
	Galić 54', 83'; Skoblar 66'		Ducke 69'	Stadium: JNA Stadium; Attendance: 40,000; Referee: Ferenc Virágh (Hungary)

31 May 1961 1962 FIFA World Cup Group 1	Soviet Union	2–0	Yugoslavia	Arica, Chile
	Ivanov 51'; Ponedelnik 83'			Stadium: Estadio Carlos Dittborn; Attendance: 9,622; Referee: Albert Dusch (Germany)

2 June 1962 1962 FIFA World Cup Group 1	Yugoslavia	3–1	Uruguay	Arica, Chile
	Skoblar 25' (pen.); Galić 29'; Jerković 49'		Cabrera 18'	Stadium: Estadio Carlos Dittborn; Attendance: 8,829; Referee: Karol Galba (Czechoslovakia)

7 June 1962 1962 FIFA World Cup Group 1	Yugoslavia	5–0	Colombia	Arica, Chile
	Galić 20', 61'; Jerković 25', 87'; Melić 82'			Stadium: Estadio Carlos Dittborn; Attendance: 7,167; Referee: Carlos Robles (Chile)

10 June 1962 1962 FIFA World Cup Quarter-finals	Yugoslavia	1–0	West Germany	Santiago, Chile
	Radaković 85'			Stadium: Estadio Nacional; Attendance: 63,324; Referee: Arturo Yamasaki Maldonado (Peru)

13 June 1962 1962 FIFA World Cup Semi-finals	Czechoslovakia	3–1	Yugoslavia	Viña del Mar, Chile
	Kadabra 69'; Scherer 81', 85' (pen.)		Jerković 69'	Stadium: Estadio Sausalito; Attendance: 5,890; Referee: Gottfried Dienst (Switzerland)

16 June 1962 1962 FIFA World Cup Third place	Chile	1–0	Yugoslavia	Santiago, Chile
	Rojas 90'			Stadium: Estadio Nacional; Attendance: 66,697; Referee: Juan Gardeazábal Garay (Spain)

16 September 1962 International friendly	East Germany	2–2	Yugoslavia	Leipzig, East Germany
	Wirth 45'; Schröter 49'		Zambata 20'; Jerković 43'	Stadium: Zentralstadion; Attendance: 35,000; Referee: Václav Korelus (Czechoslovakia)

19 September 1962 International friendly	Yugoslavia	5–2	Ethiopia	Belgrade, Yugoslavia
	Lukarić 3'; Matuš 5', 8' (pen.); Zambata 12', 54'		Vassalo 4'; Worku 19'	Stadium: Stadion Karaburma; Attendance: 8,000; Referee: Jenö Gero (Hungary)

30 September 1962 International friendly	Yugoslavia	2–3	West Germany	Zagreb, Yugoslavia
	Galić 10', 75'		Strehl 19', 24', 61'	Stadium: Stadion Maksimir; Attendance: 50,000; Referee: Gino Rigato (Italy)

14 October 1962 International friendly	Hungary	0–1	Yugoslavia	Budapest, Hungary
			Galić 70'	Stadium: Népstadion; Attendance: 35,000; Referee: Friedrich Seipelt (Austria)

4 November 1962 1964 European Nations' Cup qualifying	Yugoslavia	3–2	Belgium	Belgrade, Yugoslavia
	Skoblar 12', 32' (pen.); Vasović 89'		Stockman 26'; Jurion 58'	Stadium: JNA Stadium; Attendance: 25,430; Referee: Alojz Obtulovič (Czechoslovakia)

=== 1963 ===
31 March 1963 1964 European Nations' Cup qualifying	Belgium	0–1	Yugoslavia	Brussels, Belgium
			Galić 21'	Stadium: Heysel Stadium; Attendance: 24,583; Referee: Vicente Caballero (Spain)

== Socialist Federal Republic of Yugoslavia ==
19 June 1963 1964 European Nations' Cup qualifying	Yugoslavia	0–0	Sweden	Belgrade, Yugoslavia
				Stadium: JNA Stadium; Attendance: 45,098; Referee: Karl Kainer (Austria)

18 September 1963 1964 European Nations' Cup qualifying	Sweden	3–2	Yugoslavia	Malmö, Sweden
	Persson 30', 60'; Bild 72'		Zambata 21'; Galić 64'	Stadium: Malmö Stadion; Attendance: 20,774; Referee: Jack Taylor (England)

6 October 1963 International friendly	Yugoslavia	2–0	Hungary	Belgrade, Yugoslavia
	Skoblar 12'; Samardžić 28'			Stadium: JNA Stadium; Attendance: 50,000; Referee: Alfred Haberfelner (Austria)

6 October 1963 International friendly	Romania	2–1	Yugoslavia	Bucharest, Romania
	Ţîrcovnicu 17'; Haidu 33'		Smajlović 5'	Stadium: Stadionul August 23; Attendance: 40,000; Referee: Włodzimierz Storoniak (Poland)

3 November 1963 International friendly	Yugoslavia	2–0	Czechoslovakia	Zagreb, Yugoslavia
	Zambata 50'; Skoblar 54'			Stadium: Stadion Maksimir; Attendance: 40,000; Referee: Ryszard Banasiuk (Poland)

=== 1964 ===
18 March 1964 International friendly	Bulgaria	0–1	Yugoslavia	Sofia, Bulgaria
			Zambata 40'	Stadium: Vasil Levski National Stadium; Attendance: 30,000; Referee: Petre Sotir (Romania)

1 April 1964 International friendly	Yugoslavia	1–0	Bulgaria	Niš, Yugoslavia
	Zambata 65'			Stadium: Čair Stadium; Attendance: 10,000; Referee: Yiannis Kalofisoudis (Greece)

17 May 1964 International friendly	Czechoslovakia	2–3	Yugoslavia	Prague, Czechoslovakia
	Mráz 56'; Masný 86'		Skoblar 25'; Samardžić 36'; Zambata 72'	Stadium: Stadion Československé Armády; Attendance: 15,000; Referee: Friedrich Mayer (Austria)

17 June 1964 International friendly	Yugoslavia	1–2	Romania	Belgrade, Yugoslavia
	Takač 61'		Georgescu 69'; Popescu 82'	Stadium: JNA Stadium; Attendance: 10,000; Referee: Gábor Soós (Hungary)

20 September 1964 1966 FIFA World Cup qualification Group 3	Yugoslavia	3–1	Luxembourg	Belgrade, Yugoslavia
	Kovačević 15'; Jerković 25'; Galić 86'		Schmit 71'	Stadium: JNA Stadium; Attendance: 35,000; Referee: Petros Tzouvaras (Greece)

27 September 1964 International friendly	Austria	3–2	Yugoslavia	Vienna, Austria
	Vasović 35'; Nemec 48', 90'		Melić 35'	Stadium: Praterstadion; Attendance: 55,000; Referee: Jenö Gero (Hungary)

13 October 1964 1964 Summer Olympics Group B	Yugoslavia	3–1	Morocco	Yokohama, Japan
	Samardžić 8'; Belin 12', 59'		Bouachra 2'	Stadium: Mitsuzawa Soccer Stadium; Attendance: 12,685; Referee: Hussein Imam (Egypt)

15 October 1964 1964 Summer Olympics Group B	Hungary	6–5	Yugoslavia	Setagaya, Japan
	Csernai 5', 11', 44', 63' (pen.); Farkas 18'; Bene 25' (pen.)		Osim 1', 82'; Belin 12', 35'; Zambata 31'	Stadium: Komazawa Olympic Park Stadium; Attendance: 19,316; Referee: Genichi Fukushima (Japan)

18 October 1964 1964 Summer Olympics Quarter-finals	East Germany	1–0	Yugoslavia	Tokyo, Japan
	Frenzel 1'			Stadium: Chichibunomiya Rugby Stadium; Attendance: 15,767; Referee: Gregg de Silva (Malaysia)

20 October 1964 1964 Summer Olympics consolation round	Japan	1–6	Yugoslavia	Osaka, Japan
	Kamamoto 61'		Zambata 3', 5', 43', 63'; Osim 28', 60'	Stadium: Nagai Stadium; Attendance: 20,000; Referee: Hussein Imam (Egypt)

22 October 1964 1964 Summer Olympics 5th place match	Romania	3–0	Yugoslavia	Osaka, Japan
	Pavlovici 50'; Pîrcălab 72'; Constantin 78'			Stadium: Nagai Stadium; Attendance: 10,000; Referee: István Zsolt (Hungary)

25 October 1964 International friendly	Hungary	2–1	Yugoslavia	Budapest, Hungary
	Albert 9', 39'		Skoblar 89'	Stadium: Népstadion; Attendance: 30,000; Referee: Josef Stoll (Austria)

28 October 1964 International friendly	Israel	2–0	Yugoslavia	Tel Aviv, Israel
	Spiegler 63'; Cohen 70'			Stadium: Bloomfield Stadium; Attendance: 17,000; Referee: Helmut Fritz (Germany)

22 November 1964 International friendly	Yugoslavia	1–1	Soviet Union	Belgrade, Yugoslavia
	Zambata 22'		Serebryanikov 9'	Stadium: Red Star Stadium; Attendance: 30,000; Referee: Nicolae Mihăilescu (Romania)

=== 1965 ===
18 April 1965 1966 FIFA World Cup qualification Group 3	Yugoslavia	1–0	France	Belgrade, Yugoslavia
	Galić 59'			Stadium: Red Star Stadium; Attendance: 23,906; Referee: Dimitros Vlachoyannis (Austria)

9 May 1965 International friendly	Yugoslavia	1–1	England	Belgrade, Yugoslavia
	Kovačević 15'		Bridges 20'	Stadium: Red Star Stadium; Attendance: 60,000; Referee: Jenö Gere (Hungary)

16 June 1965 1966 FIFA World Cup qualification Group 3	Norway	3–0	Yugoslavia	Oslo, Norway
	Seemann 9'; Nilsen 60'; Berg 87'			Stadium: Ullevaal Stadion; Attendance: 29,726; Referee: John Lowry (Wales)

4 September 1965 International friendly	Soviet Union	0–0	Yugoslavia	Moscow, Soviet Union
				Stadium: Lenin Central Stadium; Attendance: 60,000; Referee: Włodzimierz Storoniak (Poland)

19 September 1965 1966 FIFA World Cup qualification Group 3	Luxembourg	2–5	Yugoslavia	Luxembourg, Luxembourg
	Pilot 39', 50'		Galić 3', 11'; Džajić 37', 58'; Mušović 42'	Stadium: Stade Municipal; Attendance: 10,780; Referee: Zdeněk Valeš (Czechoslovakia)

9 October 1965 1966 FIFA World Cup qualification Group 3	France	1–0	Yugoslavia	Paris, France
	Gondet 77'			Stadium: Parc des Princes; Attendance: 35,546; Referee: Frede Hansen (Denmark)

7 November 1965 1966 FIFA World Cup qualification Group 3	Yugoslavia	1–1	Norway	Belgrade, Yugoslavia
	Vasović 23'		Stavrum 8'	Stadium: JNA Stadium; Attendance: 30,000; Referee: Menachen Ashkenazy (Israel)

=== 1966 ===
4 May 1966 International friendly	England	2–0	Yugoslavia	London, England
	Greaves 10'; Charlton 35'			Stadium: Wembley Stadium; Attendance: 54,000; Referee: Johannes Malka (Germany)

8 May 1966 International friendly	Yugoslavia	2–0	Hungary	Zagreb, Yugoslavia
	Gugleta 9'; Skoblar 75'			Stadium: Stadion Maksimir; Attendance: 30,000; Referee: Atanas Stavrev (Bulgaria)

1 June 1966 International friendly	Yugoslavia	0–2	Bulgaria	Belgrade, Yugoslavia
			Zhekov 20', 51'	Stadium: JNA Stadium; Attendance: 20,000; Referee: Václav Davídek (Soviet Union)

23 June 1966 International friendly	West Germany	2–0	Yugoslavia	Hannover, West Germany
	Overath 32'; Seeler 76'			Stadium: Niedersachsenstadion; Attendance: 75,000; Referee: Bertil Lööw (Sweden)

27 June 1966 International friendly	Sweden	1–1	Yugoslavia	Malmö, Sweden
	Nildén 16'		Santrač 61'	Stadium: Malmö Stadion; Attendance: 15,784; Referee: Kurt Tschenscher (Germany)

18 September 1966 International friendly	Yugoslavia	1–2	Soviet Union	Belgrade, Yugoslavia
	Mušović 49'		Krasnitskiy 15'; Matveyev 45' (pen.)	Stadium: JNA Stadium; Attendance: 15,000; Referee: Gyula Emsberger (Hungary)

12 October 1966 International friendly	Israel	1–3	Yugoslavia	Tel Aviv, Israel
	Spiegler 35'		Zambata 34'; Bukal 42', 86'	Stadium: Bloomfield Stadium; Attendance: 17,000; Referee: Aharon Shoshani (Israel)

19 October 1966 International friendly	Yugoslavia	1–0	Czechoslovakia	Belgrade, Yugoslavia
	Džajić 20'			Stadium: JNA Stadium; Attendance: 25,000; Referee: Eduard Babauczek (Austria)

6 November 1966 International friendly	Bulgaria	6–1	Yugoslavia	Sofia, Bulgaria
	Zhekov 7', 15'; Vasilev 28'; Dermendzhiev 48'; Dimitrov 78', 79'		Gugleta 43'	Stadium: Vasil Levski National Stadium; Attendance: 10,000; Referee: Jan Pawlik (Poland)

=== 1967 ===
23 April 1967 International friendly	Hungary	1–0	Yugoslavia	Budapest, Hungary
	Bene 25'			Stadium: Népstadion; Attendance: 30,000; Referee: Robert Héliès (France)

3 May 1967 UEFA Euro 1968 qualifying Group 4	Yugoslavia	1–0	West Germany	Belgrade, Yugoslavia
	Skoblar 67'			Stadium: JNA Stadium; Attendance: 36,508; Referee: José María Ortiz de Mendíbil (Spain)

14 May 1967 UEFA Euro 1968 qualifying Group 4	Albania	0–2	Yugoslavia	Tirana, Albania
			Zambata 22', 56'	Stadium: Stadiumi Qemal Stafa; Attendance: 18,573; Referee: Costas Xanthoulis (Cyprus)

7 October 1967 UEFA Euro 1968 qualifying Group 4	West Germany	3–1	Yugoslavia	Hamburg, West Germany
	Löhr 10'; Müller 71'; Seeler 86'		Zambata 46'	Stadium: Volksparkstadion; Attendance: 70,573; Referee: Concetto Lo Bello (Italy)

1 November 1967 International friendly	Netherlands	1–2	Yugoslavia	Rotterdam, Netherlands
	Swart 54'		Belin 80'; Osim 81'	Stadium: Stadion Feijenoord; Attendance: 64,000; Referee: Kurt Tschenscher (Germany)

17 December 1967 UEFA Euro 1968 qualifying Group 4	Yugoslavia	4–0	Albania	Belgrade, Yugoslavia
	Sprečo 44'; Osim 48', 82'; Lazarević 56'			Stadium: JNA Stadium; Attendance: 30,000; Referee: Andrei Rădulescu (Romania)

=== 1968 ===
6 April 1968 UEFA Euro 1968 qualifying play-offs	France	1–1	Yugoslavia	Marseille, France
	Di Nallo 78'		Musemić 66'	Stadium: Stade Vélodrome; Attendance: 35,423; Referee: Erwin Vetter (Germany)

24 April 1968 UEFA Euro 1968 qualifying play-offs	Yugoslavia	5–1	France	Belgrade, Yugoslavia
	Petković 2', 32'; Musemić 13', 79'; Džajić 14'		Di Nallo 33'	Stadium: Red Star Stadium; Attendance: 47,747; Referee: Paul Schiller (Austria)

27 April 1968 International friendly	Czechoslovakia	3–0	Yugoslavia	Bratislava, Czechoslovakia
	Kuna 5'; Jokl 30'; Adamec 50'			Stadium: Tehelné pole Attendance: 25,000; Referee: Todor Bechirov (Bulgaria)

5 June 1968 UEFA Euro 1968 Semi-finals	Yugoslavia	1–0	England	Florence, Italy
	Džajić 86'			Stadium: Stadio Comunale; Attendance: 21,834; Referee: José María Ortiz de Mendíbil (Spain)

8 June 1968 UEFA Euro 1968 Final	Italy	1–1 (a.e.t.)	Yugoslavia	Rome, Italy
	Domenghini 80'		Džajić 39'	Stadium: Stadio Olimpico; Attendance: 68,817; Referee: Gottfried Dienst (Switzerland)

10 June 1968 UEFA Euro 1968 Final (Replay)	Italy	2–0	Yugoslavia	Rome, Italy
	Riva 12'; Anastasi 31'			Stadium: Stadio Olimpico; Attendance: 32,886; Referee: José María Ortiz de Mendíbil (Spain)

25 June 1968 International friendly	Yugoslavia	0–2	Brazil	Belgrade, Yugoslavia
	Torres 14' (pen.); Tostão 40'			Stadium: JNA Stadium; Attendance: 30,000; Referee: István Zsolt (Hungary)

25 September 1968 1970 FIFA World Cup qualification Group 6	Yugoslavia	9–1	Finland	Belgrade, Yugoslavia
	Zambata 9', 73', 87'; Musemić 39', 57', 90'; Džajić 58', 65'; Osim 62'		Tolsa 88'	Stadium: JNA Stadium; Attendance: 6,810; Referee: Mitko Chukov (Bulgaria)

16 October 1968 1970 FIFA World Cup qualification Group 6	Belgium	3–0	Yugoslavia	Brussels, Belgium
	Devrindt 35', 73'; Polleunis 84'			Stadium: Émile Versé Stadium; Attendance: 20,233; Referee: Josef Krňávek (Czechoslovakia)

27 October 1968 1970 FIFA World Cup qualification Group 6	Yugoslavia	0–0	Spain	Belgrade, Yugoslavia
				Stadium: Red Star Stadium; Attendance: 23,963; Referee: Ferdinand Marschall (Austria)

17 December 1968 International friendly	Brazil	3–3	Yugoslavia	Rio de Janeiro, Brazil
	Torres 39'; Pelé 60'; Babá 66'		Spasovski 7'; Džajić 48'; Bukal 90'	Stadium: Maracanã Stadium; Attendance: 70,000; Referee: Miguel Angel Comesańa (Argentina)

19 December 1968 International friendly	Brazil	3–2	Yugoslavia	Belo Horizonte, Brazil
	Ronaldo 35'; Amauri 41'; Vaguinho 53'		Musemić 8'; Bjeković 11'	Stadium: Mineirão; Attendance: 35,000; Referee: Ramón Barreto (Uruguay)

22 December 1968 International friendly	Argentina	1–1	Yugoslavia	Belo Horizonte, Argentina
	Olmedo 76'		Musemić 20'	Stadium: Estadio San Martín; Attendance: 50,000; Referee: Miguel Angel Comesańa (Argentina)

=== 1969 ===
26 February 1969 International friendly	Yugoslavia	2–1	Sweden	Split, Yugoslavia
	Bjeković 20'; Musemić 31'	Report	Magnusson 37'	Stadium: Stadion Poljud; Attendance: 20,000; Referee: Aurelio Angonese (Italy)

30 April 1969 International friendly	Spain	2–1	Yugoslavia	Barcelona, Spain
	Bustillo 20'; Varela 27'	Report	Pavlović 67'	Stadium: Camp Nou; Attendance: 29,914; Referee: Rudolf Scheurer (Switzerland)

4 June 1969 1970 FIFA World Cup qualification Group 6	Finland	1–5	Yugoslavia	Helsinki, Finland
	Tolsa 20'	Report	Džajić 14'; Bukal 22', 71'; Pirić 40'; Sprečo 60'	Stadium: Helsinki Olympic Stadium; Attendance: 8,740; Referee: Stanisław Eksztajn (Poland)

3 September 1969 International friendly	Yugoslavia	1–1	Romania	Belgrade, Yugoslavia
	Mujkić 56'	Report	Dembrovschi 28'	Stadium: JNA Stadium; Attendance: 15,000; Referee: László Vízhányó (Hungary)

24 September 1969 International friendly	Yugoslavia	1–3	Soviet Union	Belgrade, Yugoslavia
	Džajić 16'	Report	Asatiani 21'; Nodiya 37'; Byshovets 63'	Stadium: JNA Stadium; Attendance: 15,000; Referee: Andrei Radulescu (Romania)

19 October 1969 1970 FIFA World Cup qualification Group 6	Yugoslavia	4–0	Belgium	Skopje, Yugoslavia
	Belin 2'; Spasovski 31', 33'; Džajić 51'	Report		Stadium: Gradski stadion Skopje; Attendance: 21,583; Referee: Brunon Piotrowicz (Poland)

== See also ==
- Yugoslavia national football team results (1920–41)
- Yugoslavia national football team results (1970–92)
- Croatia national football team results
- Serbia national football team results
