= 1955–1960 Central European International Cup =

1955–60 Central European International Cup
Dr. Gerö Cup

Tournament details
- Dates: 27 March 1955 – 6 January 1960
- Teams: 6

Final positions
- Champions: Czechoslovakia (1st title)
- Runners-up: Hungary
- Third place: Austria
- Fourth place: Yugoslavia

Tournament statistics
- Matches played: 30
- Goals scored: 122 (4.07 per match)
- Attendance: 1,667,369 (55,579 per match)
- Top goal scorer: (Hungary) Lajos Tichy (7 goals)

The 1955–60 Central European International Cup was the final edition of the Central European International Cup. It was replaced by the European Nations Championship. Yugoslavia took part for the first time.

== Final standings ==
Pos	Team	Pld	W	D	L	GF	GA	GD	Pts	(Czechoslovakia)	(Hungary)	(Austria)	(Socialist Federal Republic of Yugoslavia)	(Italy)	(Switzerland)
1	Czechoslovakia	10	7	2	1	24	14	+10	16	—	1–3	3–2	1–0	2–1	2–1
2	Hungary	10	6	3	1	34	16	+18	15	2–4	—	6–1	2–2	2–0	8–0
3	Austria	10	4	3	3	21	21	0	11	2–2	2–2	—	2–1	3–2	4–0
4	Yugoslavia	10	3	3	4	21	13	+8	9	1–2	1–3	1–1	—	6–1	0–0
5	Italy	10	2	3	5	12	21	−9	7	1–1	1–1	2–1	0–4	—	3–0
6	Switzerland	10	0	2	8	10	37	−27	2	1–6	4–5	2–3	1–5	1–1	—

Source: EU-Football

== Matches ==
27 March 1955
16:00 UTC+1

Czechoslovakia	3–2	Austria
Procházka 6'; Crha 33' (pen.); Pešek 52'	Report	Probst 35'; Dienst 42'

Stadion Za Lužánkami, Brno
Attendance: 45,000
Referee: Leo Lemešić (Yugoslavia)

24 April 1955
17:00 UTC+1

Austria	2–2	Hungary
Probst 11', 30'	Report	Fenyvesi 7'; Hidegkuti 29'

Praterstadion, Vienna
Attendance: 60,000
Referee: Vasilis Diamantopoulos (Greece)

1 May 1955
15:00 UTC+1

Switzerland	2–3	Austria
Hügi 21'; Vonlanthen 42'	Report	Hofbauer 27'; Brousek 54' (pen.); Probst 58'

Wankdorf Stadium, Bern
Attendance: 40,000
Referee: Vincenzo Orlandini (Italy)

29 May 1955
16:00 UTC+1

Italy	0–4	Yugoslavia
	Report	Veselinović 48'; Zebec 65'; Bergamaschi 81' (o.g.); Vukas 82'

Stadio Comunale, Turin
Attendance: 65,000
Referee: Erich Steiner (Austria)

26 June 1955
17:30 UTC+1

Yugoslavia	0–0	Switzerland
	Report

JNA Stadium, Belgrade
Attendance: 40,000
Referee: István Zsolt (Hungary)

17 September 1955
17:00 UTC+1

Switzerland	4–5	Hungary
Vonlanthen 16', 43'; Antenen 64', 73'	Report	Machos 20', 22'; Kocsis 26'; Puskás 57', 85' (pen.)

Stade Olympique de la Pontaise, Lausanne
Attendance: 40,000
Referee: Jacques Devillers (France)

2 October 1955
15:30 UTC+1

Czechoslovakia	1–3	Hungary
Přáda 74'	Report	Kocsis 6'; Czibor 69'; Tichy 84'

Great Strahov Stadium, Prague
Attendance: 50,000
Referee: Laurent Franken (Belgium)

16 October 1955
14:30 UTC+1

Hungary	6–1	Austria
Tichy 4'; Kocsis 60'; Czibor 65', 81'; Tóth 67'; Puskás 84'	Report	Grohs 53'

Népstadion, Budapest
Attendance: 104,000
Referee: Karel van der Meer (Netherlands)

30 October 1955
15:00 UTC+1

Austria	2–1	Yugoslavia
Grohs 18'; Hanappi 48'	Report	Milutinović 26'

Praterstadion, Vienna
Attendance: 60,000
Referee: Francesco Liverani (Italy)

27 November 1955
14:00 UTC+1

Hungary	2–0	Italy
Puskás 81'; Tóth 84'	Report

Népstadion, Budapest
Attendance: 70,000
Referee: Nikolay Latyshev (Soviet Union)

29 April 1956
16:30 UTC+1

Hungary	2–2	Yugoslavia
Fenyvesi 42'; Bozsik 55'	Report	Vukas 6'; Veselinović 75'

Népstadion, Budapest
Attendance: 100,000
Referee: Lucien van Nuffel (Belgium)

10 May 1956
15:00 UTC+1

Switzerland	1–6	Czechoslovakia
Ballaman 1'	Report	Borovička 16'; Feureisl 21', 31', 61', 66'; Masopust 88'

Charmilles Stadium, Geneva
Attendance: 20,669
Referee: Jan Bronkhorst (Netherlands)

20 May 1956
17:00 UTC+1

Hungary	2–4	Czechoslovakia
Machos 28'; Bozsik 56' (pen.)	Report	Feureisl 8'; Moravčík 27', 55'; Pazdera 70'

Népstadion, Budapest
Attendance: 90,000
Referee: Leo Lemešić (Yugoslavia)

17 June 1956
17:00 UTC+1

Yugoslavia	1–1	Austria
Rajkov 60'	Report	Koller 55'

Stadion Maksimir, Zagreb
Attendance: 30,000
Referee: Sándor Harangozó (Hungary)

16 September 1956
15:00 UTC+1

Yugoslavia	1–3	Hungary
Petaković 7'	Report	Czibor 5'; Kocsis 26'; Puskás 66'

JNA Stadium, Belgrade
Attendance: 55,000
Referee: Friedrich Seipelt (Austria)

30 September 1956
15:30 UTC+1

Yugoslavia	1–2	Czechoslovakia
Stanković 66'	Report	Přáda 42', 60'

JNA Stadium, Belgrade
Attendance: 50,000
Referee: Friedrich Mayer (Austria)

11 November 1956
15:00 UTC+1

Switzerland	1–1	Italy
Ballaman 26'	Report	Firmani 35'

Wankdorf Stadium, Bern
Attendance: 57,700
Referee: Leo Horn (Netherlands)

9 December 1956
14:30 UTC+1

Italy	2–1	Austria
Longoni 37', 48'	Report	Körner 55'

Stadio Luigi Ferraris, Genoa
Attendance: 55,000
Referee: Emilio Guidi (Switzerland)

14 April 1957
15:30 UTC+1

Austria	4–0	Switzerland
Buzek 8', 53'; Haummer 62'; Koller 77'	Report

Praterstadion, Vienna
Attendance: 65,000
Referee: Vasa Stefanović (Yugoslavia)

12 May 1957
16:30 UTC+1

Yugoslavia	6–1	Italy
Zebec 10'; Milutinović 26'; Lipošinović 40', 47'; Rajkov 49'; Vukas 80'	Report	Cervato 58' (pen.)

Stadion Maksimir, Zagreb
Attendance: 45,000
Referee: Martin Macko (Czechoslovakia)

18 May 1957
16:30 UTC+1

Czechoslovakia	1–0	Yugoslavia
Borovička 57'	Report

Tehelné pole, Bratislava
Attendance: 45,000
Referee: Vasilis Diamantopoulos (Greece)

13 October 1957
14:30 UTC+1

Austria	2–2	Czechoslovakia
Körner 30'; Senekowitsch 54'	Report	Moravčík 5', 7'

Praterstadion, Vienna
Attendance: 56,000
Referee: Gottfried Dienst (Switzerland)

23 March 1958
15:00 UTC+1

Austria	3–2	Italy
Kozlicek 4'; Körner 79'; Buzek 82'	Report	Petris 47'; Firmani 61'

Praterstadion, Vienna
Attendance: 60,000
Referee: Gérard Versyp (Belgium)

20 September 1958
16:00 UTC+1

Czechoslovakia	2–1	Switzerland
Scherer 41'; Moravčík 49'	Report	Meier 28'

Tehelné pole, Bratislava
Attendance: 50,000
Referee: Lucien van Nuffel (Belgium)

13 December 1958
14:30 UTC+1

Italy	1–1	Czechoslovakia
Galli 83'	Report	Masopust 26'

Stadio Luigi Ferraris, Genoa
Attendance: 40,000
Referee: Kurt Tschenscher (West Germany)

26 April 1959
15:00 UTC+1

Switzerland	1–5	Yugoslavia
Rey 57'	Report	Lipošinović 3'; Šekularac 41', 48'; Veselinović 82', 86'

St. Jakob Stadium, Basel
Attendance: 37,000
Referee: Cesare Jonni (Italy)

25 October 1959
14:00 UTC+1

Hungary	8–0	Switzerland
Göröcs 1', 79'; Tichy 19', 28', 35', 66'; Sándor 22'; Albert 27'	Report

Népstadion, Budapest
Attendance: 70,000
Referee: Ivan Lukyanov (Soviet Union)

1 November 1959
14:15 UTC+1

Czechoslovakia	2–1	Italy
Dolinský 29'; Scherer 41'	Report	Lojacono 9'

Great Strahov Stadium, Prague
Attendance: 45,000
Referee: Reg Leafe (England)

29 November 1959
14:30 UTC+1

Italy	1–1	Hungary
Cervato 56' (pen.)	Report	Tichy 50'

Stadio Comunale, Florence
Attendance: 67,000
Referee: Piet Roomer (Netherlands)

6 January 1960
14:30 UTC+1

Italy	3–0	Switzerland
Magerli 47' (o.g.); Stacchini 64'; Montuori 81'	Report

Stadio San Paolo, Naples
Attendance: 55,000
Referee: Daniel Zariquiegui (Spain)

== Winner ==
1955–60 Central European International Cup

Czechoslovakia
first title

== Statistics ==
=== Goalscorers ===
There were 122 goals scored in 30 matches, for an average of 4.07 goals per match.

7 goals

- (Hungary) Lajos Tichy

5 goals

- (Hungary) Ferenc Puskás
- (Czechoslovakia) Anton Moravčík
- (Czechoslovakia) Jiří Feureisl

4 goals

- (Austria) Erich Probst
- (Hungary) Zoltán Czibor
- (Hungary) Sándor Kocsis
- (Socialist Federal Republic of Yugoslavia) Todor Veselinović

3 goals

- (Austria) Alfred Körner
- (Austria) Hans Buzek
- (Hungary) Ferenc Machos
- (Switzerland) Roger Vonlanthen
- (Czechoslovakia) Ladislav Přáda
- (Socialist Federal Republic of Yugoslavia) Miloš Milutinović
- (Socialist Federal Republic of Yugoslavia) Bernard Vukas

2 goals

- (Austria) Herbert Grohs
- (Italy) Angelo Longoni
- (Italy) Eddie Firmani
- (Italy) Sergio Cervato
- (Hungary) János Göröcs
- (Hungary) József Bozsik
- (Hungary) József Tóth
- (Hungary) Máté Fenyvesi
- (Switzerland) Charles Antenen
- (Switzerland) Robert Ballaman
- (Czechoslovakia) Adolf Scherer
- (Czechoslovakia) Jaroslav Borovička
- (Czechoslovakia) Josef Masopust
- (Socialist Federal Republic of Yugoslavia) Branko Zebec
- (Socialist Federal Republic of Yugoslavia) Dragoslav Šekularac
- (Socialist Federal Republic of Yugoslavia) Luka Lipošinović
- (Socialist Federal Republic of Yugoslavia) Zdravko Rajkov

1 goal

- (Austria) Gerhard Hanappi
- (Austria) Helmut Senekowitsch
- (Austria) Paul Kozlicek
- (Austria) Richard Brousek
- (Austria) Robert Dienst
- (Austria) Walter Haummer
- (Austria) Otto Hofbauer
- (Italy) Carlo Galli
- (Italy) Francisco Lojacono
- (Italy) Gino Stacchini
- (Italy) Gianfranco Petris
- (Italy) Miguel Montuori
- (Hungary) Flórián Albert
- (Hungary) Károly Sándor
- (Hungary) Nándor Hidegkuti
- (Switzerland) Eugen Meier
- (Switzerland) Josef Hügi
- (Switzerland) Gilbert Rey
- (Czechoslovakia) Arnošt Pazdera
- (Czechoslovakia) Jiří Pešek
- (Czechoslovakia) Josef Crha
- (Czechoslovakia) Milan Dolinský
- (Czechoslovakia) Zdeněk Procházka
- (Socialist Federal Republic of Yugoslavia) Aleksandar Petaković
- (Socialist Federal Republic of Yugoslavia) Branko Stanković

1 own goal

- (Italy) Mario Bergamaschi (against Yugoslavia)
- (Switzerland) Rolf Magerli (against Italy)

== See also ==
Balkan Cup
Baltic Cup
Nordic Cup
Mediterranean Cup
