= Italy national football team results (1950–1969) =

Sport result

- Win Draw Loss

This is a list of the Italy national football team results from 1950 to 1969. During this period, Italy achieved first place at UEFA Euro 1968.

== Results ==
=== 1950 ===
5 March 1950 International friendly	Italy	3–1	Belgium	Bologna, Italy
15:00 CET (UTC+01:00)	Muccinelli 38', 53'; Amadei 63'	Report	Chaves 14'	Stadium: Stadio Comunale; Attendance: 60,000; Referee: Alois Beranek (Austria)

2 April 1950 1948–53 Central European International Cup	Austria	1–0	Italy	Wien, Austria
16:30 CET (UTC+01:00)	Melchior 52'	Report		Stadium: Ernst-Happel-Stadion; Attendance: 63,000; Referee: Henry Pearce (England)

25 June 1950 1950 FIFA World Cup; Group 3	Sweden	3–2	Italy	São Paulo, Brazil
15:00 BRT (UTC−03:00)	Jeppson 25', 68'; Andersson 33'	Report	Carapellese 7'; Muccinelli 75'	Stadium: Estádio do Pacaembu; Attendance: 36,502; Referee: Jean Lutz (Switzerland)

2 July 1950 1950 FIFA World Cup; Group 3	Italy	2–0	Paraguay	São Paulo, Brazil
15:00 BRT (UTC−03:00)	Carapellese 12'; Pandolfini 62'	Report		Stadium: Estádio do Pacaembu; Attendance: 25,811; Referee: Arthur Ellis (England)

=== 1951 ===
8 April 1951^{1} International friendly	Portugal	1–4	Italy	Oeiras, Portugal
16:00 WEST (UTC+01:00)	Correia 85'	Report	Pandolfini 7'; Burini 14'; Amadei 59'; Cappello 72' (pen.)	Stadium: Estádio Nacional; Attendance: 70,000; Referee: William Ling (England)

6 May 1951 International friendly	Italy	0–0	Yugoslavia	Milan, Italy
15:30 CET (UTC+01:00)		Report		Stadium: San Siro; Attendance: 50,000; Referee: Jean Lutz (Switzerland)

3 June 1951 International friendly	Italy	4–1	France	Genoa, Italy
16:00 CET (UTC+01:00)	Lorenzi 37', 56'; Amadei 67'; Cappello 87'	Report	Grumellon 34'	Stadium: Stadio Luigi Ferraris; Attendance: 60,000; Referee: Jean Lutz (Switzerland)

11 November 1951 International friendly	Italy	1–1	Sweden	Florence, Italy
15:00 CET (UTC+01:00)	Amadei 56' (pen.)	Report	Löfgren 6'	Stadium: Stadio Comunale; Attendance: 70,000; Referee: William Ling (England)

25 November 1951 1948–53 Central European International Cup	Switzerland	1–1	Italy	Lugano, Switzerland
14:30 CET (UTC+01:00)	Riva 15'	Report	Boniperti 84'	Stadium: Cornaredo Stadium; Attendance: 30,000; Referee: William Ling (England)

=== 1952 ===
24 February 1952^{1} International friendly	Belgium	2–0	Italy	Brussels, Belgium
15:00 CET (UTC+01:00)	Moës 24' (pen.), 35'	Report		Stadium: Stade du Heysel; Attendance: 58,000; Referee: Paul Wyssling (Switzerland)

18 May 1952 International friendly	Italy	1–1	England	Florence, Italy
16:00 CET (UTC+01:00)	Amadei 58'	Report	Broadis 4'	Stadium: Stadio Comunale; Attendance: 60,000; Referee: Alois Beranek (Austria)

16 July 1952 1952 Summer Olympics; Preliminary round	Italy	8–0	United States	Tampere, Finland
19:00 EET (UTC+02:00)	Gimona 3', 51', 75'; Pandolfini 16', 62'; Venturi 27'; Fontanesi 52'; Mariani 87'	Report		Stadium: Ratina Stadion; Attendance: 15,342; Referee: Arthur Ellis (England)

21 July 1952 1952 Summer Olympics; First round	Hungary	3–0	Italy	Helsinki, Finland
19:00 EET (UTC+02:00)	Palotás 11', 20'; Kocsis 83'	Report		Stadium: Töölön Pallokenttä; Attendance: 13,870; Referee: Karel van der Meer (Netherlands)

26 October 1952 International friendly	Sweden	1–1	Italy	Stockholm, Sweden
14:00 CET (UTC+01:00)	Persson 17'	Report	Vivolo 7'	Stadium: Råsunda Stadium; Attendance: 40,000; Referee: William Evans (England)

28 December 1952 International friendly	Italy	2–0	Switzerland	Palermo, Italy
14:30 CET (UTC+01:00)	Pandolfini 3' (pen.); Frignani 72'	Report		Stadium: Stadio La Favorita; Attendance: 40,000; Referee: Laurent Franken (Belgium)

=== 1953 ===
26 April 1953 1948–53 Central European International Cup	Czechoslovakia	2–0	Italy	Prague, Czechoslovakia
15:00 CET (UTC+01:00)	Pažický 79', 82'	Report		Stadium: Generali Arena; Attendance: 35,000; Referee: Laurent Franken (Belgium)

17 May 1953 1948–53 Central European International Cup	Italy	0–3	Hungary	Rome, Italy
16:15 CET (UTC+01:00)		Report	Hidegkuti 40'; Puskás 63', 70'	Stadium: Stadio Olimpico; Attendance: 80,000; Referee: William Evans (England)

13 November 1953^{1} 1954 FIFA World Cup qualification Group 9	Egypt	1–2	Italy	Cairo, Egypt
15:00 CET (UTC+01:00)	Ad-Diba 33'	Report	Frignani 62'; Muccinelli 79'	Stadium: Al Ahly Stadium; Attendance: 22,000; Referee: Carl Steiner (Austria)

13 December 1953 1948–53 Central European International Cup	Italy	3–0	Czechoslovakia	Genoa, Italy
14:45 CET (UTC+01:00)	Cervato 23'; Ricagni 27'; Pandolfini 47' (pen.)	Report		Stadium: Stadio Luigi Ferraris; Attendance: 50,000; Referee: Henri Bauwens (Belgium)

=== 1954 ===
24 January 1954 1954 FIFA World Cup qualification Group 9	Italy	5–1	Egypt	Milan, Italy
14:30 CET (UTC+01:00)	Pandolfini 1'; Frignani 62'; Boniperti 65', 86'; Ricagni 84'	Report	El-Hamouly 32'	Stadium: San Siro; Attendance: 40,000; Referee: Leo Horn (Netherlands)

11 April 1954 International friendly	France	1–3	Italy	Colombes, France
15:00 CET (UTC+01:00)	Piantoni 26'	Report	Pandolfini 29'; Galli 35', 50'	Stadium: Stade Olympique Yves-du-Manoir; Attendance: 65,000; Referee: Arthur Ellis (England)

17 June 1954 1954 FIFA World Cup; Group 4	Switzerland	2–1	Italy	Lausanne, Switzerland
17:50 CET (UTC+01:00)	Ballaman 18'; Hügi 78'	Report	Boniperti 44'	Stadium: Stade Olympique de la Pontaise; Attendance: 43,000; Referee: Mário Vianna (Brazil)

20 June 1954 1954 FIFA World Cup; Group 4	Italy	4–1	Belgium	Lugano, Switzerland
17:00 CET (UTC+01:00)	Pandolfini 41' (pen.); Galli 48'; Frignani 58'; Lorenzi 78'	Report	Anoul 81'	Stadium: Cornaredo Stadium; Attendance: 24,000; Referee: Carl Steiner (Austria)

23 June 1954 1954 FIFA World Cup; Play-off	Switzerland	4–1	Italy	Basel, Switzerland
18:00 CET (UTC+01:00)	Hügi 14', 85'; Ballaman 48'; Fatton 90'	Report	Nesti 67'	Stadium: St. Jakob Stadium; Attendance: 30,000; Referee: Benjamin Griffiths (Wales)

5 December 1954^{1} International friendly	Italy	2–0	Argentina	Rome, Italy
14:30 CET (UTC+01:00)	Frignani 1'; Galli 48'	Report		Stadium: Stadio Olimpico; Attendance: 80,000; Referee: Carl Steiner (Austria)

=== 1955 ===
16 January 1955 International friendly	Italy	1–0	Belgium	Bari, Italy
14:30 CET (UTC+01:00)	Boniperti 43'	Report		Stadium: Stadio della Vittoria; Attendance: 42,000; Referee: Harangozó Sándor (Hungary)

30 March 1955 International friendly	West Germany	1–2	Italy	Stuttgart, West Germany
15:30 CET (UTC+01:00)	Juskowiak 29' (pen.)	Report	Frignani 9'; Pivatelli 40'	Stadium: Neckarstadion; Attendance: 82,000; Referee: István Zsolt (Hungary)

29 May 1955 1955–60 Central European International Cup	Italy	0–4	Yugoslavia	Turin, Italy
16:00 CET (UTC+01:00)		Report	Veselinović 48'; Zebec 65'; Bergamaschi 81' (o.g.); Vukas 82'	Stadium: Stadio Comunale; Attendance: 70,000; Referee: Carl Steiner (Austria)

27 November 1955 1955–60 Central European International Cup	Hungary	2–0	Italy	Budapest, Hungary
14:30 CET (UTC+01:00)	Puskás 81'; Tóth 83'	Report		Stadium: Népstadion; Attendance: 70,000; Referee: Nikolay Latyshev (Soviet Union)

18 December 1955 International friendly	Italy	2–1	West Germany	Rome, Italy
14:30 CET (UTC+01:00)	Mai 38' (o.g.); Boniperti 83'	Report	Röhrig 88'	Stadium: Stadio Olimpico; Attendance: 80,000; Referee: Arthur Ellis (England)

=== 1956 ===
15 February 1956 International friendly	Italy	2–0	France	Bologna, Italy
15:00 CET (UTC+01:00)	Carapellese 51'; Gratton 75'	Report		Stadium: Stadio Comunale; Attendance: 45,000; Referee: Leo Lemešić (Croatia)

25 April 1956 International friendly	Italy	3–0	Brazil	Milan, Italy
15:30 CET (UTC+01:00)	Virgili 13', 62' de Sordi 76' (o.g.)	Report		Stadium: San Siro; Attendance: 80,000; Referee: Leo Horn (Netherlands)

24 June 1956 International friendly	Argentina	1–0	Italy	Buenos Aires, Argentina
15:00 ARST (UTC−03:00)	Conde 65'	Report		Stadium: Estadio Monumental Antonio Vespucio Liberti; Attendance: 100,000; Referee: Reg Leafe (England)

1 July 1956 International friendly	Brazil	2–0	Italy	Rio de Janeiro, Brazil
15:30 BRT (UTC−03:00)	Ferreira 29'; Canário 75'	Report		Stadium: Maracanã Stadium; Attendance: 190,000; Referee: John Husband (England)

11 November 1956 1955–60 Central European International Cup	Switzerland	1–1	Italy	Bern, Switzerland
15:00 CET (UTC+01:00)	Ballaman 26'	Report	Firmani 35'	Stadium: Wankdorf Stadium; Attendance: 57,000; Referee: Leo Horn (Netherlands)

9 December 1956 1955–60 Central European International Cup	Italy	2–1	Austria	Genoa, Italy
14:30 CET (UTC+01:00)	Longoni 37', 48'	Report	Körner 55'	Stadium: Stadio Luigi Ferraris; Attendance: 55,000; Referee: Emilio Guidi (Switzerland)

=== 1957 ===
25 April 1957^{1} 1958 FIFA World Cup qualification Group 8	Italy	1–0	Northern Ireland	Rome, Italy
15:30 CET (UTC+01:00)	Cervato 3'	Report		Stadium: Stadio Olimpico; Attendance: 70,000; Referee: Maurice Guigue (France)

12 May 1957 1955–60 Central European International Cup	Yugoslavia	6–1	Italy	Zagreb, Yugoslavia
15:30 CET (UTC+01:00)	Zebec 10'; Milutinović 26', 47'; Lipošinović 40'; Rajkov 49'; Vukas 80'	Report	Cervato 58' (pen.)	Stadium: Stadion Maksimir; Attendance: 45,000; Referee: Martin Macko (Czechoslovakia)

26 May 1957 1958 FIFA World Cup qualification Group 8	Portugal	3–0	Italy	Lisbon, Portugal
16:30 WEST (UTC+01:00)	Vasques 41'; Teixeira 81'; Matateu 87'	Report		Stadium: Estádio Nacional; Attendance: 37,000; Referee: Werner Treichel (West Germany)

4 December 1957 International friendly	Northern Ireland	2–2	Italy	Belfast, Northern Ireland
14:15 GMT (UTC±00:00)	Cush 27', 60'	Report	Ghiggia 24'; Montuori 50'	Stadium: Windsor Park; Attendance: 53,000; Referee: Thomas Mitchell (Northern Ireland)

22 December 1957 1958 FIFA World Cup qualification Group 8	Italy	3–0	Portugal	Milan, Italy
14:30 WEST (UTC+01:00)	Gratton 36', 72'; Pivatelli 84'	Report		Stadium: San Siro; Attendance: 50,000; Referee: Ezio Damiani (Yugoslavia)

=== 1958 ===
15 January 1958 1958 FIFA World Cup qualification Group 8	Northern Ireland	2–1	Italy	Belfast, Northern Ireland
14:15 GMT (UTC±00:00)	McIlroy 13'; Cush 28'	Report	Da Costa 56'	Stadium: Windsor Park; Attendance: 43,000; Referee: István Zsolt (Hungary)

23 March 1958 1955–60 Central European International Cup	Austria	3–2	Italy	Wien, Austria
15:00 CET (UTC+01:00)	Kozlicek 41'; Körner 79'; Buzek 82'	Report	Petris 47'; Firmani 61'	Stadium: Ernst-Happel-Stadion; Attendance: 60,000; Referee: Gérard Versyp (Belgium)

9 November 1958^{1} International friendly	France	2–2	Italy	Colombes, France
14:30 CET (UTC+01:00)	Vincent 15'; Fontaine 84'	Report	Nicolè 57', 65'	Stadium: Stade Olympique Yves-du-Manoir; Attendance: 60,000; Referee: Juan Gardeazábal (Spain)

13 December 1958^{1} 1955–60 Central European International Cup	Italy	1–1	Czechoslovakia	Genoa, Italy
14:30 CET (UTC+01:00)	Galli 82'	Report	Masopust 26'	Stadium: Stadio Luigi Ferraris; Attendance: 58,000; Referee: Kurt Tschenscher (West Germany)

=== 1959 ===
28 February 1959 International friendly	Italy	1–1	Spain	Rome, Italy
15:00 CET (UTC+01:00)	Lojacono 84'	Report	Di Stéfano 68'	Stadium: Stadio dei Centomila; Attendance: 65,000; Referee: Friedrich Seipelt (Austria)

6 May 1959 International friendly	England	2–2	Italy	London, England
15:00 BST (UTC+01:00)	Charlton 26'; Bradley 38'	Report	Brighenti 56'; Mariani 61'	Stadium: Wembley Stadium; Attendance: 92,000; Referee: Albert Dusch (West Germany)

1 November 1959 1955–60 Central European International Cup	Czechoslovakia	2–1	Italy	Prague, Czechoslovakia
14:00 CET (UTC+01:00)	Dolinský 29'; Scherer 41'	Report	Lojacono 9'	Stadium: Strahov Stadium; Attendance: 45,000; Referee: Reg Leafe (England)

29 November 1959 1955–60 Central European International Cup	Italy	1–1	Hungary	Florence, Italy
14:00 CET (UTC+01:00)	Cervato 56' (pen.)	Report	Tichy 50'	Stadium: Stadio Comunale; Attendance: 67,000; Referee: Piet Roomer (Netherlands)

=== 1960 ===
6 January 1960^{1} 1955–60 Central European International Cup	Italy	3–0	Switzerland	Naples, Italy
14:30 CET (UTC+01:00)	Mägerli 47' (o.g.); Stacchini 64'; Montuori 81'	Report		Stadium: Stadio San Paolo; Attendance: 60,000; Referee: Daniel Zariquiegui Izco (Spain)

13 March 1960 International friendly	Spain	3–1	Italy	Barcelona, Spain
16:30 CET (UTC+01:00)	Vergés 53'; Di Stéfano 60'; Martínez 85'	Report	Lojacono 39'	Stadium: Estadio del Club de Fútbol Barcelona; Attendance: 85,000; Referee: Albert Dusch (West Germany)

10 December 1960^{1} International friendly	Italy	1–2	Austria	Naples, Italy
18:30 CET (UTC+01:00)	Boniperti 27'	Report	Hof 7'; Kaltenbrunner 55'	Stadium: Stadio San Paolo; Attendance: 15,000; Referee: Pierre Schwinte (France)

=== 1961 ===
25 April 1961 International friendly	Italy	3–2	Northern Ireland	Bologna, Italy
15:30 CET (UTC+01:00)	Stacchini 30', 58'; Sívori 78'	Report	Dougan 71'; McAdams 72'	Stadium: Stadio Comunale; Attendance: 17,500; Referee: Jacques Devillers (France)

24 May 1961 International friendly	Italy	2–3	England	Rome, Italy
16:00 CET (UTC+01:00)	Sívori 43'; Brighenti 74'	Report	Hitchens 39', 77'; Greaves 86'	Stadium: Stadio Olimpico; Attendance: 62,000; Referee: Nikolay Latyshev (Soviet Union)

15 June 1961 International friendly	Italy	4–1	Argentina	Florence, Italy
21:30 CET (UTC+01:00)	Lojacono 13'; Sívori 20', 41'; Mora 86' (pen.)	Report	Sacchi 67'	Stadium: Stadio Comunale; Attendance: 36,500; Referee: Marcel Bois (France)

15 October 1961 1962 FIFA World Cup qualification Group 7	Israel	2–4	Italy	Ramat Gan, Israel
15:00 IST (UTC+02:00)	Stelmach 15'; Young 38'	Report	Lojacono 53' (pen.); Altafini 79'; Corso 87', 90'	Stadium: Ramat Gan Stadium; Attendance: 40,000; Referee: Yordan Takov (Bulgaria)

4 November 1961 1962 FIFA World Cup qualification Group 7	Italy	6–0	Israel	Turin, Italy
14:30 CET (UTC+01:00)	Sivori 16', 52', 65', 88'; Corso 59'; Angelillo 69'	Report		Stadium: Stadio Comunale; Attendance: 64,000; Referee: Manuel Asensi Martín (Spain)

=== 1962 ===
5 May 1962^{1} International friendly	Italy	2–1	France	Florence, Italy
16:00 CET (UTC+01:00)	Altafini 47', 51'	Report	Piumi 28'	Stadium: Stadio Comunale; Attendance: 45,000; Referee: Josef Kandlbinder (West Germany)

13 May 1962 International friendly	Belgium	1–3	Italy	Brussels, Belgium
16:00 CET (UTC+01:00)	Van Himst 52'	Report	Menichelli 22'; Altafini 61', 89'	Stadium: Stade du Heysel; Attendance: 50,000; Referee: Jarl Hansen (Denmark)

31 May 1962 1962 FIFA World Cup; Group 2	West Germany	0–0	Italy	Santiago, Chile
15:00 CLT (UTC−04:00)		Report		Stadium: Estadio Nacional; Attendance: 65,440; Referee: Robert Holley Davidson (Scotland)

2 June 1962 1962 FIFA World Cup; Group 2	Chile	2–0	Italy	Santiago, Chile
15:00 CLT (UTC−04:00)	Ramírez 73'; Toro 87'	Report		Stadium: Estadio Nacional; Attendance: 66,057; Referee: Kenneth Aston (England)

7 June 1962 1962 FIFA World Cup; Group 2	Italy	3–0	Switzerland	Santiago, Chile
15:00 CLT (UTC−04:00)	Mora 2'; Bulgarelli 65', 67'	Report		Stadium: Estadio Nacional; Attendance: 59,828; Referee: Nikolay Latyshev (Soviet Union)

11 November 1962^{1} International friendly	Austria	1–2	Italy	Wien, Austria
14:00 CET (UTC+01:00)	Nemec 90'	Report	Pascutti 64', 77'	Stadium: Ernst-Happel-Stadion; Attendance: 60,000; Referee: Joseph Barbéran (France)

2 December 1962 1964 European Nations' Cup qualifying Preliminary round	Italy	6–0	Turkey	Bologna, Italy
14:30 CET (UTC+01:00)	Rivera 15', 47'; Orlando 22', 29', 35', 85'	Report		Stadium: Stadio Comunale; Attendance: 28,000; Referee: Lucien van Nuffel (Belgium)

=== 1963 ===
27 March 1963 1964 European Nations' Cup qualifying Preliminary round	Turkey	0–1	Italy	Istanbul, Turkey
13:30 EET (UTC+02:00)		Report	Sormani 86'	Stadium: Mithat Paşa Stadium; Attendance: 27,290; Referee: Dimitar Rumenchev (Bulgaria)

12 May 1963 International friendly	Italy	3–0	Brazil	Milan, Italy
16:00 CET (UTC+01:00)	Sormani 35'; A. Mazzola 39' (pen.); Bulgarelli 76'	Report		Stadium: San Siro; Attendance: 72,000; Referee: Marcel Bois (France)

9 June 1963 International friendly	Austria	0–1	Italy	Wien, Austria
17:00 CET (UTC+01:00)		Report	Trapattoni 56'	Stadium: Praterstadion; Attendance: 38,000; Referee: Josef Kandlbinder (West Germany)

13 October 1963 1964 European Nations' Cup qualifying First round	Soviet Union	2–0	Italy	Moscow, Soviet Union
17:00 MT (UTC+03:00)	Ponedelnik 22'; Chislenko 42'	Report		Stadium: Central Lenin Stadium; Attendance: 102,358; Referee: Ryszard Banasiuk (Poland)

10 November 1963 1964 European Nations' Cup qualifying First round	Italy	1–1	Soviet Union	Rome, Italy
14:30 CET (UTC+01:00)	Rivera 89'	Report	Gusarov 33'	Stadium: Stadio Olimpico; Attendance: 69,567; Referee: Daniel Mellet (Switzerland)

14 December 1963 International friendly	Italy	1–0	Austria	Turin, Italy
16:00 CET (UTC+01:00)	Rivera 75'	Report		Stadium: Stadio Comunale; Attendance: 35,000; Referee: Gérard Versyp (Belgium)

=== 1964 ===
11 April 1964 International friendly	Italy	0–0	Czechoslovakia	Florence, Italy
16:30 CET (UTC+01:00)		Report		Stadium: Stadio Comunale; Attendance: 50,000; Referee: José González Echeverría (Spain)

10 May 1964 International friendly	Switzerland	1–3	Italy	Lausanne, Switzerland
14:30 CET (UTC+01:00)	A. Mazzola 6'; Corso 37'; Rivera 55'	Report	Eschmann 13' (pen.)	Stadium: Stade Olympique de la Pontaise; Attendance: 43,000; Referee: Gere Gyula (Hungary)

4 November 1964 1964 FIFA World Cup qualification Group 8	Italy	6–1	Finland	Genoa, Italy
14:45 CET (UTC+01:00)	Facchetti 1'; Holmqvist 8' (o.g.); Rivera 16'; Bulgarelli 49'; A. Mazzola 54', 83'	Report	Peltonen 88'	Stadium: Stadio Luigi Ferraris; Attendance: 23,000; Referee: Manuel Lousada (Portugal)

5 December 1964 International friendly	Italy	3–1	Denmark	Bologna, Italy
14:30 CET (UTC+01:00)	Pascutti 77', 85'; Bulgarelli 79'	Report	Enoksen 43'	Stadium: Stadio Comunale; Attendance: 24,000; Referee: Johannes Malka (West Germany)

=== 1965 ===
13 March 1965 International friendly	West Germany	1–1	Italy	Hamburg, Germany
16:00 CET (UTC+01:00)	Sieloff 41' (pen.)	Report	A. Mazzola 75'	Stadium: Volksparkstadion; Attendance: 70,000; Referee: Gunnar Michaelsen (Denmark)

18 April 1965 1964 FIFA World Cup qualification Group 8	Poland	0–0	Italy	Warsaw, Poland
12:00 CET (UTC+01:00)		Report		Stadium: Stadion Dziesięciolecia; Attendance: 33,000; Referee: Piet Roomer (Netherlands)

1 May 1965 International friendly	Italy	4–1	Wales	Florence, Italy
16:00 CET (UTC+01:00)	Lodetti 24', 76'; Barison 62'; Nocera 90'	Report	Godfrey 80'	Stadium: Stadio Comunale; Attendance: 43,000; Referee: Michel Kitabdjian (France)

16 June 1965 International friendly	Sweden	2–2	Italy	Malmö, Sweden
19:00 CET (UTC+01:00)	Larsson 68' (pen.); Persson 81'	Report	Pascutti 36'; A. Mazzola 59'	Stadium: Malmö Stadion; Attendance: 32,000; Referee: Kestutis Andziulis (Soviet Union)

23 June 1965 1964 FIFA World Cup qualification Group 8	Finland	0–2	Italy	Helsinki, Finland
19:00 EET (UTC+02:00)		Report	A. Mazzola 33', 78'	Stadium: Helsinki Olympic Stadium; Attendance: 25,000; Referee: Tofik Bakhramov (Soviet Union)

27 June 1965 International friendly	Hungary	2–1	Italy	Budapest, Hungary
18:00 CET (UTC+01:00)	Albert 37'; Bene 81'	Report	A. Mazzola 46'	Stadium: Népstadion; Attendance: 20,000; Referee: Friedrich Mayer (Austria)

1 November 1965 1964 FIFA World Cup qualification Group 8	Italy	6–1	Poland	Rome, Italy
14:45 CET (UTC+01:00)	A. Mazzola 5'; Barison 25', 65', 87'; Rivera 71'; Mora 79'	Report	Lubański 84'	Stadium: Stadio Olimpico; Attendance: 80,000; Referee: Abraham Klein (Israel)

9 November 1965 1964 FIFA World Cup qualification Group 8	Scotland	1–0	Italy	Glasgow, Scotland
19:30 GMT (UTC±00:00)	Greig 88'	Report		Stadium: Hampden Park; Attendance: 103,000; Referee: Rudolf Kreitlein (West Germany)

7 December 1965 1964 FIFA World Cup qualification Group 8	Italy	3–0	Scotland	Naples, Italy
14:30 CET (UTC+01:00)	Pascutti 38'; Facchetti 73'; Mora 89'	Report		Stadium: Stadio San Paolo; Attendance: 77,000; Referee: István Zsolt (Hungary)

=== 1966 ===
19 March 1966 International friendly	France	0–0	Italy	Paris, France
15:00 CET (UTC+01:00)		Report		Stadium: Parc des Princes; Attendance: 35,000; Referee: Joseph Hannet (Belgium)

14 June 1966 International friendly	Italy	6–1	Bulgaria	Bologna, Italy
18:30 CEST (UTC+02:00)	A. Mazzola 26'; Perani 32'; Rizzo 58', 70'; Barison 68'; Meroni 82'	Report	Asparuhov 53'	Stadium: Stadio Comunale; Attendance: 25,000; Referee: Rudolf Kreitlein (West Germany)

18 June 1966 International friendly	Italy	1–0	Austria	Milan, Italy
19:00 CEST (UTC+02:00)	Burgnich 73'	Report		Stadium: San Siro; Attendance: 40,000; Referee: Bertil Lööw (Sweden)

22 June 1966 International friendly	Italy	3–0	Argentina	Turin, Italy
19:00 CEST (UTC+02:00)	Pascutti 32', 47'; Meroni 81'	Report		Stadium: Stadio Comunale; Attendance: 65,000; Referee: Manuel Lousada (Portugal)

29 June 1966 International friendly	Italy	5–0	Mexico	Florence, Italy
19:00 CEST (UTC+02:00)	Bulgarelli 26', 34'; Rivera 59', 85'; A. Mazzola 78'	Report		Stadium: Stadio Comunale; Attendance: 45,000; Referee: István Zsolt (Hungary)

13 July 1966 1966 FIFA World Cup; Group 4	Italy	2–0	Chile	Sunderland, England
20:30 BST (UTC+01:00)	A. Mazzola 8'; Barison 88'	Report		Stadium: Roker Park; Attendance: 27,199; Referee: Gottfried Dienst (Switzerland)

16 July 1966 1966 FIFA World Cup; Group 4	Soviet Union	1–0	Italy	Sunderland, England
15:00 BST (UTC+01:00)	Chislenko 57'	Report		Stadium: Roker Park; Attendance: 27,793; Referee: Rudolf Kreitlein (West Germany)

19 July 1966 1966 FIFA World Cup; Group 4	North Korea	1–0	Italy	Middlesbrough, England
19:30 BST (UTC+01:00)	Pak Doo-ik 42'	Report		Stadium: Ayresome Park; Attendance: 17,829; Referee: Pierre Schwinte (France)

1 November 1966^{1} International friendly	Italy	1–0	Soviet Union	Milan, Italy
14:30 CET (UTC+01:00)	Guarneri 22'	Report		Stadium: San Siro; Attendance: 55,000; Referee: Juan Gardeazábal (Spain)

26 November 1966 UEFA Euro 1968 qualifying Group 6	Italy	3–1	Romania	Naples, Italy
14:30 CET (UTC+01:00)	A. Mazzola 30', 67'; De Paoli 43'	Report	Dobrin 7'	Stadium: Stadio San Paolo; Attendance: 75,000; Referee: Gerhard Schulenburg (West Germany)

=== 1967 ===
22 March 1967 UEFA Euro 1968 qualifying Group 6	Cyprus	0–2	Italy	Nicosia, Cyprus
15:45 EET (UTC+02:00)		Report	Domenghini 76'; Facchetti 88'	Stadium: GSP Stadium; Attendance: 11,105; Referee: Atanas Stavrev Kiryakov (Bulgaria)

27 March 1967 International friendly	Italy	1–1	Portugal	Rome, Italy
15:00 CET (UTC+01:00)	Cappellini 74'	Report	Eusébio 24'	Stadium: Stadio Olimpico; Attendance: 65,000; Referee: Jim Finney (England)

25 June 1967^{1} UEFA Euro 1968 qualifying Group 6	Romania	0–1	Italy	Bucharest, Romania
17:30 EET (UTC+02:00)		Report	Bertini 81'	Stadium: Stadionul 23. August; Attendance: 54,371; Referee: Manuel Gomez Arribas (Spain)

1 November 1967 UEFA Euro 1968 qualifying Group 6	Italy	5–0	Cyprus	Cosenza, Italy
14:30 CET (UTC+01:00)	A. Mazzola 12', 22'; Riva 46', 55', 59'	Report		Stadium: Stadio San Vito; Attendance: 22,059; Referee: Antoine Queudeville (Luxembourg)

18 November 1967 UEFA Euro 1968 qualifying Group 6	Switzerland	2–2	Italy	Bern, Switzerland
14:45 CET (UTC+01:00)	Quentin 34'; Künzli 68'	Report	Riva 66', 85' (pen.)	Stadium: Wankdorf Stadium; Attendance: 53,137; Referee: István Zsolt (Hungary)

23 December 1967 UEFA Euro 1968 qualifying Group 6	Italy	4–0	Switzerland	Cagliari, Italy
14:30 CET (UTC+01:00)	A. Mazzola 3'; Riva 13'; Domenghini 45', 67'	Report		Stadium: Stadio Amsicora; Attendance: 24,743; Referee: Tiny Wharton (Scotland)

=== 1968 ===
6 April 1968 UEFA Euro 1968 qualifying Quarter-final	Bulgaria	3–2	Italy	Sofia, Bulgaria
17:00 EET (UTC+02:00)	Kotkov 11' (pen.); Dermendzhiev 66'; Zhekov 73'	Report	Penev 60' (o.g.); Prati 83'	Stadium: Vasil Levski National Stadium; Attendance: 68,000; Referee: Gerhard Schulenburg (West Germany)

20 April 1968 UEFA Euro 1968 qualifying Quarter-final	Italy	2–0	Bulgaria	Naples, Italy
16:00 CET (UTC+01:00)	Prati 14'; Domenghini 55'	Report		Stadium: Stadio San Paolo; Attendance: 90,000; Referee: Gottfried Dienst (Switzerland)

5 June 1968 UEFA Euro 1968; Semi-final	Italy	0–0 (a.e.t.)	Soviet Union	Naples, Italy
18:00 CEST (UTC+02:00)		Italy win on coin toss		Stadium: Stadio San Paolo; Attendance: 68,582; Referee: Kurt Tschenscher (West Germany)
Note: Italy captain Giacinto Facchetti called the coin toss correctly.

8 June 1968 UEFA Euro 1968; Final	Italy	1–1 (a.e.t.)	Yugoslavia	Rome, Italy
22:15 CEST (UTC+02:00)	Domenghini 80'	Report	Džajić 39'	Stadium: Stadio Olimpico; Attendance: 68,817; Referee: Gottfried Dienst (Switzerland)

8 June 1968 UEFA Euro 1968; Final (replay)	Italy	2–0	Yugoslavia	Rome, Italy
21:15 CEST (UTC+02:00)	Riva 12'; Anastasi 31'	Report		Stadium: Stadio Olimpico; Attendance: 32,866; Referee: José María Ortiz de Mendíbil (Spain)

23 October 1968 1970 FIFA World Cup qualification Group 3	Wales	0–1	Italy	Cardiff, Wales
19:30 GMT (UTC±00:00)		Report	Riva 44'	Stadium: Ninian Park; Attendance: 18,558; Referee: Joaquim Campos (Portugal)

=== 1969 ===
1 January 1969 International friendly	Mexico	2–3	Italy	Mexico City, Mexico
16:30 CST (UTC−06:00)	Borja 44'; González 71'	Report	Riva 57', 89'; Anastasi 59'	Stadium: Estadio Azteca; Attendance: 65,000; Referee: Abel Aguilar Elizalde (Mexico)

5 January 1969 International friendly	Mexico	1–1	Italy	Mexico City, Mexico
12:00 CST (UTC−06:00)	Padilla 62'	Report	Bertini 89'	Stadium: Estadio Azteca; Attendance: 65,000; Referee: Antonio Sbardella (Italy)

29 March 1969 1970 FIFA World Cup qualification Group 3	East Germany	2–2	Italy	East Berlin, East Germany
15:00 CET (UTC+01:00)	Vogel 26'; Kreische 75'	Report	Riva 54', 82'	Stadium: Walter-Ulbricht-Stadion; Attendance: 52,117; Referee: Antonio Sbardella (Italy)

24 May 1969 International friendly	Italy	0–0	Bulgaria	Turin, Italy
17:00 CET (UTC+01:00)		Report		Stadium: Stadio Comunale; Attendance: 60,000; Referee: Jim Finney (England)

4 November 1969 1970 FIFA World Cup qualification Group 3	Italy	4–1	Wales	Rome, Italy
14:30 CET (UTC+01:00)	Riva 37', 73', 81'; A. Mazzola 55'	Report	England 67'	Stadium: Stadio Olimpico; Attendance: 67,481; Referee: Todor Bechirov (Bulgaria)

22 November 1969 1970 FIFA World Cup qualification Group 3	Italy	3–0	East Germany	Naples, Italy
14:30 CET (UTC+01:00)	A. Mazzola 7'; Domenghini 25'; Riva 36'	Report		Stadium: Stadio San Paolo; Attendance: 84,293; Referee: Paul Schiller (Austria)

^{1}Indicates new coach / Technical Commission
