= Anton Moravčík =

Slovak footballer

Personal information
- Full name: Anton Moravčík
- Date of birth: 3 June 1931
- Place of birth: Komárno, Czechoslovakia
- Date of death: 12 December 1996 (aged 65)
- Place of death: Bratislava, Slovakia
- Position: Midfielder

Senior career*
Years	Team	Apps	(Gls)
1949–1953	Sokol Slovena Žilina		
1953–1955	ÚDA Praha		
1955–1964	Slovan Bratislava		

International career
1952–1960	Czechoslovakia	25	(10)
Medal record
Men's football
Representing Czechoslovakia
Central European International Cup
Gold medal – first place	1955-60 Central European International Cup
- * Club domestic league appearances and goals

Anton Moravčík (3 June 1931 in Komárno – 12 December 1996 in Bratislava) was a Slovak football player.

He played for several clubs, including Iskra Žilina, ÚDA Prague and Slovan Bratislava.

He played for the Czechoslovakia national team (25 matches/10 goals) and was a participant at the 1958 FIFA World Cup and the 1955-60 Central European International Cup, which Czechoslovakia national team won, with him being his teams joint top scorer.

== International ==
Czechoslovakia

- Central European International Cup: 1955-60
