= Zdeněk Procházka =

Czechoslovak footballer

Personal information
- Date of birth: 12 January 1928
- Place of birth: Czechoslovakia
- Date of death: 24 September 2016 (aged 88)
- Position: Midfielder

Senior career*
Years	Team	Apps	(Gls)
1946–1952	SK Viktoria Žižkov		
1952–1961	AC Sparta Prague	167	(15)
1961–1965	TJ Viktoria Žižkov		

International career
1953–1957	Czechoslovakia	8	(1)
- * Club domestic league appearances and goals

Zdeněk Procházka (12 January 1928 – 24 September 2016) was a Czechoslovak football midfielder who played for Czechoslovakia in the 1954 FIFA World Cup. He also played for AC Sparta Prague.
