= 1970 FIFA World Cup qualification – UEFA Group 3 =

Football tournament qualification stage

The 1970 FIFA World Cup qualification UEFA Group 3 was a UEFA qualifying group for the 1970 FIFA World Cup. The group comprised East Germany, Italy and Wales.

== Standings ==
Rank	Team	Pld	W	D	L	GF	GA	GD	Pts
1	Italy	4	3	1	0	10	3	+7	7
2	East Germany	4	2	1	1	7	7	0	5
3	Wales	4	0	0	4	3	10	−7	0

== Matches ==
23 October 1968

Wales	0–1	Italy
	Report	Riva 44'

Ninian Park, Cardiff
Attendance: 18,558
Referee: Campos (Portugal)

29 March 1969

East Germany	2–2	Italy
Vogel 26'; Kreische 75'	Report	Riva 54', 82'

Walter-Ulbricht-Stadion, East Berlin
Attendance: 52,117
Referee: Boström (Sweden)

16 April 1969

East Germany	2–1	Wales
Löwe 31'; Rock 89'	Report	Toshack 57'

Heinz-Steyer-Stadion, Dresden
Attendance: 38,198
Referee: Geluck (Belgium)

22 October 1969

Wales	1–3	East Germany
Powell 83'	Report	Vogel 54'; Löwe 60'; Frenzel 62'

Ninian Park, Cardiff
Attendance: 22,409
Referee: Machin (France)

4 November 1969

Italy	4–1	Wales
Riva 37', 73', 81'; Mazzola 55'	Report	England 67'

Stadio Olimpico, Rome
Attendance: 67,481
Referee: Beczirow (Bulgaria)

22 November 1969

Italy	3–0	East Germany
Mazzola 7'; Domenghini 25'; Riva 36'	Report

Stadio San Paolo, Naples
Attendance: 84,259
Referee: Paul Schiller (Austria)
