= Arnošt Pazdera =

Czech footballer (1929–2021)

Personal information
- Date of birth: 16 September 1929
- Date of death: 27 October 2021 (aged 92)
- Position: Midfielder

International career
Years	Team	Apps	(Gls)
1952–1958	Czechoslovakia	19	(3)

Arnošt Pazdera (16 September 1929 – 27 October 2021) was a Czech footballer who played as a midfielder. He played in 19 matches for the Czechoslovakia national team from 1952 to 1958.
