= Otto Hofbauer =

Austrian footballer

Personal information
- Date of birth: 4 January 1932 (age 94)

International career
Years	Team	Apps	(Gls)
1955	Austria	2	(1)

Otto Hofbauer (born 4 January 1932) is an Austrian footballer. He played in two matches for the Austria national football team in 1955.
