= Gilbert Rey =

Swiss footballer (born 1930)

Personal information
- Date of birth: 30 October 1930 (age 96)
- Place of birth: Switzerland
- Position: Forward

Senior career*
| Years | Team | Apps | (Gls) |
- FC Lausanne-Sport

International career
- Switzerland
- * Club domestic league appearances and goals

Gilbert Rey (born 30 October 1930) is a Swiss former football forward who played for Switzerland in the 1962 FIFA World Cup. He also played for FC Lausanne-Sport.
