= Jaroslav Borovička =

Czech footballer

Personal information
- Date of birth: 26 November 1931
- Place of birth: Prague, Czechoslovakia
- Date of death: 29 December 1992 (aged 61)
- Position: Striker

Youth career
- –1950: SK Michle

Senior career*
Years	Team	Apps	(Gls)
1950–1952	Spartak Sokolovo		
1952–1963	Dukla Prague	266	(77)
- VŽKG Vítkovice
- Spartak BS Vlašim

International career
1953–1961	Czechoslovakia	21	(2)
Medal record
Men's football
Representing Czechoslovakia
FIFA World Cup
Runner-up	1962 Chile
- * Club domestic league appearances and goals

Jaroslav Borovička (26 January 1931 – 29 December 1992) was a former Czech football player.

During his club career he played for Dukla Prague. He earned 21 caps for the Czechoslovakia national football team, and was part of the second-placed team at the 1962 FIFA World Cup, and also played in the 1958 FIFA World Cup.

He won the Czechoslovak First League with Dukla six times, and the Czechoslovak Cup in 1961.
