= Lajos Tichy =

Hungarian footballer (1935–1999)

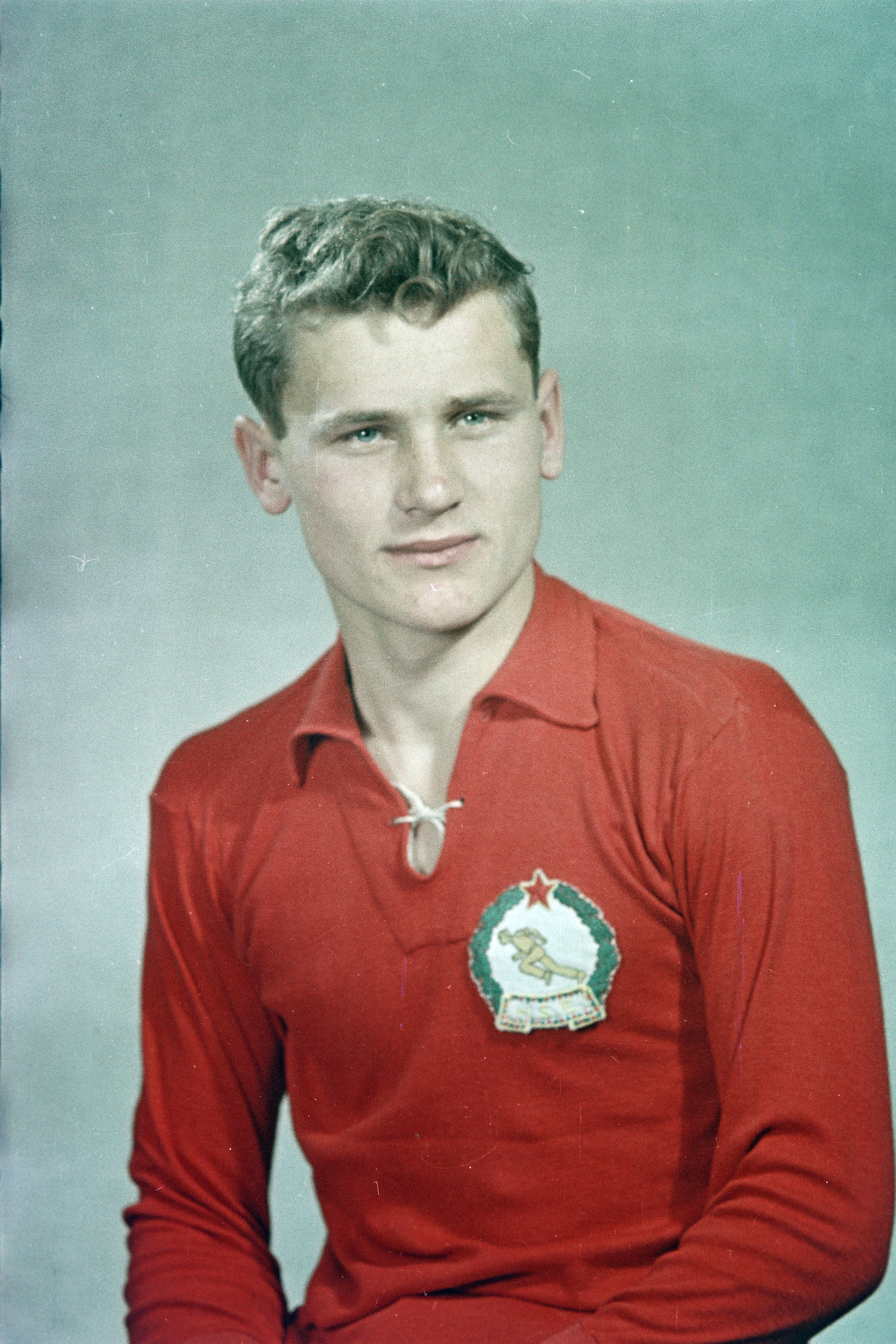
- Tichy in 1954

Personal information
- Date of birth: 21 March 1935
- Place of birth: Budapest, Hungary
- Date of death: 6 January 1999 (aged 63)
- Place of death: Budapest, Hungary
- Position: Striker

Youth career
- 1947–1950: MÉMOSZ SE
- 1950–1953: Budapest Lokomotiv

Senior career*
Years	Team	Apps	(Gls)
1952–1953	Budapest Lokomotiv	34	(12)
1953–1971	Budapest Honvéd	318	(242)
Total		352	(254)

International career
1954–1971	Hungary	72	(51)

Managerial career
- 1976–1982: Budapest Honvéd
Medal record
Men's football
Representing Hungary
Central European International Cup
Silver medal – second place	1955–60 Central European International Cup
- * Club domestic league appearances and goals

Lajos Tichy (21 March 1935 – 6 January 1999), nicknamed "The Nation's Bomber", was a Hungarian footballer who played as a forward. According to RSSSF, he is the most prolific goalscorer in recorded history, netting 201 goals in 85 matches in a single season. He played for Budapest Honvéd FC, scoring 247 goals in 320 league games. He also scored 51 goals in 72 internationals for the Hungary national football team, including four in the 1958 FIFA World Cup and three in the 1962 FIFA World Cup. He later became coach of the Honvéd youth team and from 1976 to 1982 he coached the first team, helping them win their first Hungarian championship in 25 years in 1980.

== Career statistics ==
=== Club ===
Appearances and goals by club, season and competition
Club	Season	League			Cup		Europe		Total	
Club	Season	Division	Apps	Goals	Apps	Goals	Apps	Goals	Apps	Goals
Budapest Honvéd	1953	Nemzeti Bajnokság I								
Budapest Honvéd	1954	Nemzeti Bajnokság I	13	8					13	8
Budapest Honvéd	1955	Nemzeti Bajnokság I	15	12					15	12
Budapest Honvéd	1956	Nemzeti Bajnokság I	14	9			1 (Note: Appearance in European Cup)	0	15	9
Budapest Honvéd	1957	Nemzeti Bajnokság I	11	6					11	6
Budapest Honvéd	1957–58	Nemzeti Bajnokság I	24	14					24	14
Budapest Honvéd	1958–59	Nemzeti Bajnokság I	22	15					22	15
Budapest Honvéd	1959–60	Nemzeti Bajnokság I	25	26					25	26
Budapest Honvéd	1960–61	Nemzeti Bajnokság I	25	21					25	21
Budapest Honvéd	1961–62	Nemzeti Bajnokság I	23	23					23	23
Budapest Honvéd	1962–63	Nemzeti Bajnokság I	20	20					20	20
Budapest Honvéd	1963	Nemzeti Bajnokság I	12	13					12	13
Budapest Honvéd	1964	Nemzeti Bajnokság I	25	28			2 (Note: Appearances in European Cup Winners' Cup)	0	27	28
Budapest Honvéd	1965	Nemzeti Bajnokság I	20	20			6	7	26	27
Budapest Honvéd	1966	Nemzeti Bajnokság I	15	8					15	8
Budapest Honvéd	1967	Nemzeti Bajnokság I	12	7					12	7
Budapest Honvéd	1968	Nemzeti Bajnokság I	7	0					7	0
Budapest Honvéd	1969	Nemzeti Bajnokság I	16	3					16	3
Budapest Honvéd	1970	Nemzeti Bajnokság I	7	5					7	5
Budapest Honvéd	1970–71	Nemzeti Bajnokság I	12	4			2	0	14	4
Total			318	242			11	7	329	249*

*According to the RSSSF, counting unofficial goals and matches, he has the most all-time amount of goals, reaching 1917 in 1307 matches

== Honours ==
=== Player ===
Budapest Honvéd

- Nemzeti Bajnokság I: 1954, 1955
- Magyar Kupa: 1964
- Mitropa Cup: 1959

Hungary

- Central European International Cup: Runner-up: 1955–60

=== Individual ===
- Central European International Cup top scorer: 1955–60
- Mitropa Cup top scorer: 1959

== International goals ==
Scores and results list Hungary's goal tally first.

List of international goals scored by Lajos Tichy
No.	Date	Venue	Opponent	Result	Competition
1.	8 May 1955	Oslo, Norway	Norway	5–0	Friendly
2	19 May 1955	Helsinki, Finland	Finland	9–1	Friendly
3	19 May 1955	Helsinki, Finland	Finland	9–1	Friendly
4	2 October 1955	Prague, Czechoslovakia	Czechoslovakia	3–1	1955–60 Central European International Cup
5	16 October 1955	Budapest, Hungary	Austria	6–1	1955–60 Central European International Cup
6	13 November 1955	Budapest, Hungary	Sweden	4–2	Friendly
7	29 February 1956	Beirut, Lebanon	Lebanon	4–1	Friendly
8	29 February 1956	Beirut, Lebanon	Lebanon	4–1	Friendly
9	12 June 1957	Oslo, Norway	Norway	1–2	1958 FIFA World Cup qualification
10	12 June 1958	Stockholm, Sweden	Sweden	1–2	1958 FIFA World Cup
11	15 June 1958	Sandviken, Sweden	Mexico	4–0	1958 FIFA World Cup
12	15 June 1958	Sandviken, Sweden	Mexico	4–0	1958 FIFA World Cup
13	17 June 1958	Stockholm, Sweden	Wales	1–2	1958 FIFA World Cup
14	14 September 1958	Chorzów, Poland	Poland	3–1	Friendly
15	5 October 1958	Zagreb, Yugoslavia	Yugoslavia	4–4	Friendly
16	26 October 1958	Bucharest, Romania	Romania	2–1	Friendly
17	23 November 1958	Budapest, Hungary	Belgium	3–1	Friendly
18	23 November 1958	Budapest, Hungary	Belgium	3–1	Friendly
19	19 April 1959	Budapest, Hungary	Yugoslavia	4–0	Friendly
20	19 April 1959	Budapest, Hungary	Yugoslavia	4–0	Friendly
21	25 October 1959	Budapest, Hungary	Switzerland	8–0	1955–60 Central European International Cup
22	25 October 1959	Budapest, Hungary	Switzerland	8–0	1955–60 Central European International Cup
23	25 October 1959	Budapest, Hungary	Switzerland	8–0	1955–60 Central European International Cup
24	25 October 1959	Budapest, Hungary	Switzerland	8–0	1955–60 Central European International Cup
25	8 November 1959	Budapest, Hungary	West Germany	4–3	Friendly
26	8 November 1959	Budapest, Hungary	West Germany	4–3	Friendly
27	29 November 1959	Florence, Italy	Italy	1–1	1955–60 Central European International Cup
28	5 June 1960	Budapest, Hungary	Scotland	3–3	Friendly
29	30 October 1960	Brussels, Belgium	Belgium	1–2	Friendly
30	30 April 1961	Rotterdam, Netherlands	Netherlands	3–0	1962 FIFA World Cup qualification
31	7 May 1961	Beograd, Yugoslavia	Yugoslavia	4–2	Friendly
32.	7 May 1961	Beograd, Yugoslavia	Yugoslavia	4–2	Friendly
33.	28 May 1961	Budapest, Hungary	Wales	3–2	Friendly
34.	28 May 1961	Budapest, Hungary	Wales	3–2	Friendly
35	10 September 1961	Berlin, East Germany	East Germany	3–2	1962 FIFA World Cup qualification
36	8 October 1961	Vienna, Austria	Austria	1–2	Friendly
37	22 October 1961	Budapest, Hungary	Netherlands	3–3	1962 FIFA World Cup qualification
38	9 December 1961	Santiago, Chile	Chile	1–5	Friendly
39	31 May 1962	Rancagua, Chile	England	2–1	1962 FIFA World Cup
40	3 June 1962	Rancagua, Chile	Bulgaria	6–1	1962 FIFA World Cup
41	3 June 1962	Rancagua, Chile	Bulgaria	6–1	1962 FIFA World Cup
42	24 June 1962	Vienna, Austria	Austria	2–1	Friendly
43	24 June 1962	Vienna, Austria	Austria	2–1	Friendly
44	2 September 1962	Poznań, Poland	Poland	2–0	Friendly
45	7 November 1962	Budapest, Hungary	Wales	3–1	1964 European Nations' Cup qualifying
46	11 November 1962	Paris, France	France	3–2	Friendly
47	11 November 1962	Paris, France	France	3–2	Friendly
48	20 March 1963	Cardiff, Wales	Wales	1–1	1964 European Nations' Cup qualifying
49	2 June 1963	Prague, Czechoslovakia	Czechoslovakia	2–2	Friendly
50	25 April 1964	Paris, France	France	3–1	1964 European Nations' Cup qualifying
51	25 April 1964	Paris, France	France	3–1	1964 European Nations' Cup qualifying

== See also ==
- List of men's footballers with 50 or more international goals
- List of men's footballers with 500 or more goals
- List of FIFA World Cup top goalscorers
