= Herbert Grohs =

Austrian footballer (1931–2018)

Personal information
- Date of birth: 4 May 1931
- Place of birth: Austria
- Date of death: 7 April 2018 (aged 86)
- Position: Forward

Senior career*
Years	Team	Apps	(Gls)
1951–1953	Grazer SC		
1953–1958	First Vienna FC	95	(53)
1958–1959	SV Austria Salzburg		
1959–1960	First Vienna FC	25	(12)
1960–1962	1.Schwechater SC	53	(12)
1964–1965	SC Wacker Wien	1	(0)
1965–1966	1.Schwechater SC	5	(0)

International career
1955–1957	Austria	7	(2)
- * Club domestic league appearances and goals

Herbert Grohs (4 May 1931 – 7 April 2018) was an Austrian football forward who played for Austria. He also played for Grazer SC, SC Schwechat, First Vienna FC, SV Austria Salzburg and SC Wacker Wien. He also competed in the men's tournament at the 1952 Summer Olympics.
