= Paul Kozlicek =

Austrian footballer

Personal information
- Full name: Paul Kozlicek
- Date of birth: 22 July 1937
- Place of birth: Vienna, Austria
- Date of death: 26 November 1999 (aged 62)
- Place of death: Sevilla, Spain
- Position: Striker

Senior career*
Years	Team	Apps	(Gls)
1955–1959	SC Wacker Wien	100	(68)
1959–1965	Linzer ASK	120	(41)
1965–1971	Admira Energie	148	(4)
Total		368	(113)

International career
1956–1963	Austria	14	(1)
- * Club domestic league appearances and goals

Paul Kozlicek (22 July 1937, in Vienna, Austria – 26 November 1999, in Sevilla, Spain) was an Austrian football player.

His older brother Ernst was also an international footballer and was known as Kozlicek I while Paul was named Kozlicek II.

== Club career ==
Kozlicek played for several clubs, including SC Wacker Wien (1949–1959), Linzer ASK (1959–1965) and SK Admira Wien (1965–1971).

== International career ==
He made his debut for Austria in March 1956 against France and was a participant at the 1958 FIFA World Cup. He earned 14 caps, scoring one goal.

== Honours ==
- Austrian Football Bundesliga (2):
  - 1965, 1966
- Austrian Cup (1):
  - 1965, 1966
