= Branko Zebec =

Croatian footballer and manager

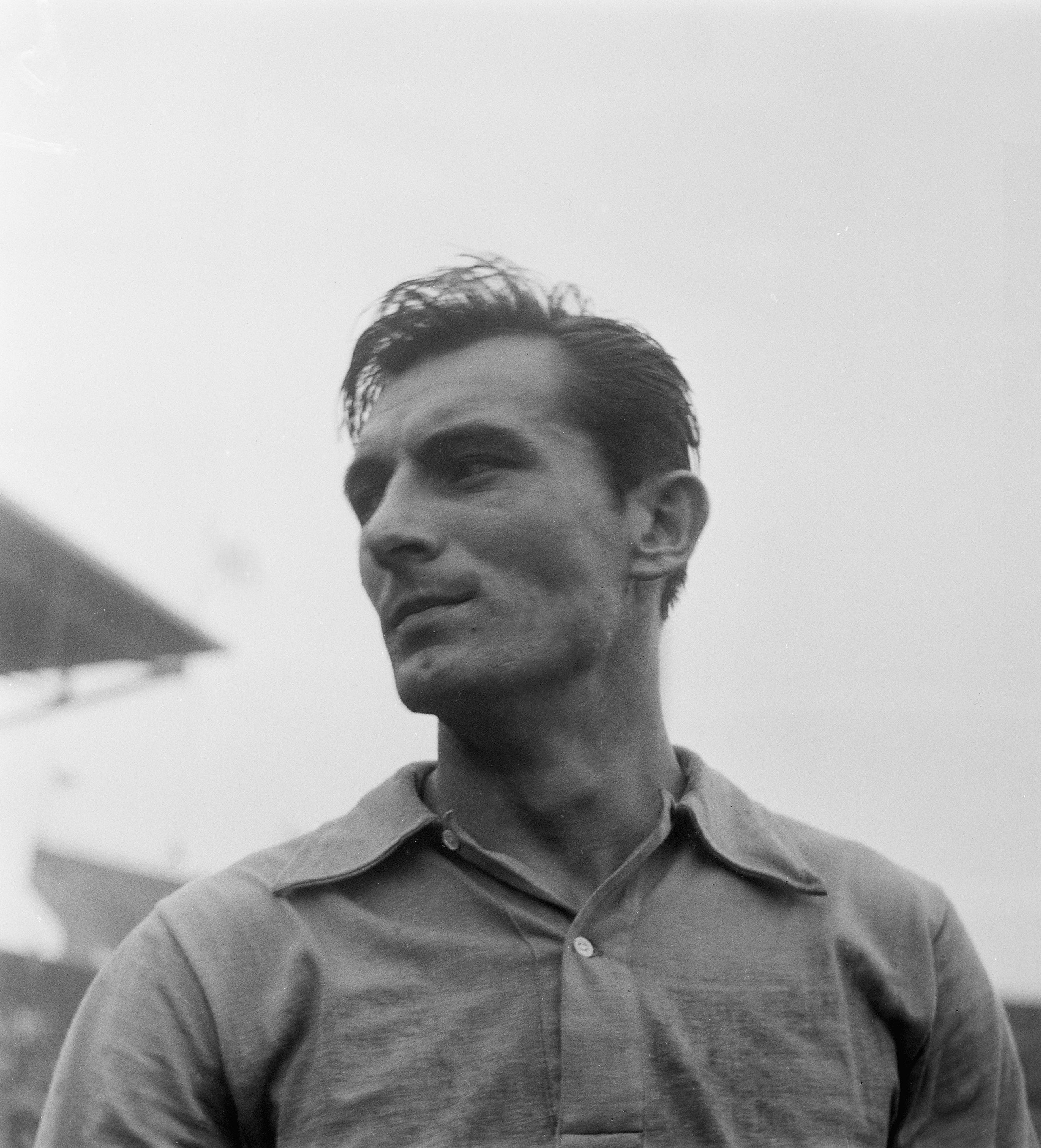
- Zebec in 1953

Personal information
- Full name: Branislav Zebec
- Date of birth: 17 May 1929
- Place of birth: Zagreb, Kingdom of Serbs, Croats, and Slovenes
- Date of death: 26 September 1988 (aged 59)
- Place of death: Zagreb, SR Croatia, Yugoslavia
- Height: 1.76 m (5 ft 9 in)
- Positions: Left full-back; left winger

Senior career*
Years	Team	Apps	(Gls)
1943–1945	Građanski Zagreb		
1946–1947	Poštar Zagreb		
1947	Lokomotiva Zagreb		
1948–1951	Borac Zagreb		
1951–1959	Partizan	131	(39)
1959–1961	Red Star Belgrade	29	(6)
1961–1965	Alemannia Aachen	71	(4)
Total		231	(49)

International career
1951–1961	Yugoslavia	65	(17)

Managerial career
- 1966–1967: Dinamo Zagreb
- 1968–1970: Bayern Munich
- 1970–1972: VfB Stuttgart
- 1972–1973: Hajduk Split
- 1974–1978: Eintracht Braunschweig
- 1978–1980: Hamburger SV
- 1981–1982: Borussia Dortmund
- 1982–1983: Eintracht Frankfurt
- 1984: Dinamo Zagreb
Medal record
Men's Football
Representing Yugoslavia
Olympic Games
Silver medal – second place	1952 Helsinki	Team
European Championship
Silver medal – second place	1960 France	Team
- * Club domestic league appearances and goals

Branislav "Branko" Zebec (17 May 1929 – 26 September 1988) was a Croatian footballer and manager who played for Yugoslavia.

In his heyday, Zebec fascinated the world with his performances at the World Cups in 1954 and 1958. With Partizan he won 3 Yugoslav Cups (1952, 1954, 1957). With Red Star Belgrade he won the national championship in 1960. As coach he led Hajduk Split, Bayern Munich and Hamburger SV to success. A highly versatile player noted for his physical abilities and understanding of the game, Zebec was world-class whether on the left wing or in the more defensive role of left fullback, although he was capable of playing almost every outfield position on the pitch. He was particularly well known for his pace, having been able to run 100 meters in 11 seconds with football boots.

== Playing career ==
In his youth days Zebec played for a number of teams in his hometown: Građanski Zagreb, Poštar Zagreb, Lokomotiva Zagreb and Borac Zagreb. In 1951 he had the call from Partizan, one of the capital city teams dominating Yugoslav football. His quality and speed soon secured him a place on the left wing of the team, and almost as soon with the national team, in which he would feature 65 times, scoring 17 goals. In 1952 he won his first title, the national cup. In the same year, the Summer Olympics in Helsinki provided a great international stage for him. Yugoslavia had to settle for the silver medal, because this tournament was also the birthplace of the Hungarian miracle team of the 1950s. With seven goals Zebec was to secure for himself the honour of top scorer of the event.

At the club level, his successful career continued. 1954 saw Partizan finishing second in the championship and again winning the cup. Zebec secured an invitation for the 1954 FIFA World Cup in Switzerland. There Yugoslavia overcame the group stage with a win against France and a draw against Brazil thanks to a goal by Zebec. In the quarterfinals, the eventual winners Germany put a stop to the campaign of the team from the Balkans.

In his club side Zebec evolved more and more to be the leading player in midfield, a position for which he was most suitable due to his intelligence. In 1955 he played in the Partizan debut in the European Cup (Partizan played as a nominated team and not as a national champion – a historic peculiarity of the first edition of this tournament). In the first round, Partizan beat Sporting CP in two high scoring encounters, 5–2 and 8–5. In the second round, then the quarterfinals, the team of the era, Real Madrid, put an end to Yugoslavia's first entry into this new competition as a home 3–0 win against the Iberian glamour side was insufficient to compensate for a 0–4 defeat at the hands of Alfredo Di Stéfano and Co. in the Spanish capital. On the domestic scene, Partizan remained in the shadow of the big two of those days, Hajduk Split, and Crvena Zvezda (Red Star Belgrade). Thus, in 1956 Partizan again had to make do with being honourable runner up in the championship, as they did in 1958. In between Partizan would grab another Yugoslav cup.

By the time the 1958 FIFA World Cup in Sweden took place Zebec had become the captain of the national side. In the group stages, draws against Scotland and Paraguay and a win against France was enough to enter the quarterfinals, but, as four years before, Germany put an end to Yugoslav ambitions. Zebec earned a total of 65 caps, scoring 17 goals. and his final international was a June 1961 World Cup qualification match against Poland.

In Yugoslavia he achieved another second place in the championship before making a controversial switch of allegiances to local rivals Red Star, where at the end of his career, in 1960, he finally got his hands on the championship trophy. This would remain his last honour as player. In 1963 he was old enough for a player to leave the country.

== Coaching career ==
Branko Zebec got his first coaching assignment soon after he finished playing. In 1965 he became joint coach of the Yugoslav first division side Dinamo in his hometown Zagreb. He held the office together with Ivica Horvat, who later too would enjoy success in Germany. The team was to qualify for the Inter Cities Fairs Cup, the precursor of the UEFA Cup. Initially, things were not looking promising in this campaign. The aggregate result in the first round encounters with Czech side Spartak Brno was 2–2, and only the toss of a coin saw Dinamo advancing. After Dunfermline and Dinamo Piteşti were eliminated, Juventus were their opponents in the quarterfinals, but were overcome 2–2 and 3–0. In the semifinals Dinamo managed one of the great comebacks in the history of European competitions. After a 0–3 defeat in Frankfurt against Eintracht Dinamo outclassed the Germans in Zagreb 4–0.

In the finals the club had to face Leeds United then with Peter Lorimer and Billy Bremner in the team. The home leg was won 2–0, thus a nil-all draw in England was sufficient.

=== Bayern Munich ===
This was an opportunity for Zebec to grab attention beyond the Yugoslav borders and in 1968 he was hired by Bayern Munich to follow in the footstep of his compatriot "Czik" Čajkovski, himself a former Dinamo player and a teammate of Zebec in the days of the 1952 Olympics and 1954 FIFA World Cup. The team around the young Franz Beckenbauer and Gerd Müller had won two national cups and the European Cup Winners' Cup. He curbed the offensive style of the team and reinforced the defence. In his first season, Zebec won with them the German championship, the club's first in 37 years. To boot, the team also won the cup, and thus also achieved the first double in the history of the German Bundesliga. The next season began with problems. Bayern was ousted in the first round of the European Cup of Champions at the hands of AS Saint-Etienne. Already early in the season Zebec announced that he would not extend his contract at the end of the year. As Bayern experienced a spell of three matches with only one point mid-way through the second half of the season and fell back five points behind the leaders his contract was even terminated prematurely. Udo Lattek was to succeed him. In a later book Beckenbauer reported of "atmospheric disturbances" between the coach and the team.

For Zebec there now followed a stay of almost two years with VfB Stuttgart, then a team with aspirations of joining the top of the league. He led the unimpressive team, which was in his second season reinforced with German international Horst Köppel and the Austrian midfielder Hans "Buffy" Ettmayer to positions 12 and 8, respectively. This was disappointing for both, club and coach, thus, here also the last couple of months of his contract were cut short.

Zebec returned for a season to Yugoslavia, where this time he coached Hajduk Split in tandem with Tomislav Ivić, another very notable coach. The team impressed particularly in the Cup Winners' Cup where they made it all the way to the semifinals, ousting Norway's Fredrikstad F.K., Welsh side Wrexham A.F.C. and in the quarterfinals the Scottish Cup winners Hibernian F.C. Hajduk lost in Scotland 2–4, but almost miraculously recovered at home with a 3–0 triumph. However, in the semifinals a 0–1 defeat away to Leeds United proved lethal. The 0–0 draw at home meant the end of the road for the Croatians, but reaching this semifinal remains the greatest international success for them to date. Leeds ended up missing out on winning this tournament by the tightest of margins losing the final against AC Milan 0–1.

The team finished the national league a disappointing 9th, but the defence of the Yugoslav Cup through a victory against champions Red Star Belgrade assured a memorable season eventually. The 1970s were to be Hajduk's golden decade after all, but without Branko Zebec, who returned to Germany.

=== Return to Germany: Eintracht Braunschweig ===
Eintracht Braunschweig, in 1967 still champions of Germany, were relegated in 1973 – the year they pioneered advertising on jerseys – but returned to the Bundesliga inside a year. The club, which then had a liquor manufacturer on a spending spree as main sponsor, engaged Zebec in search of better times. Zebec hired two fellow Yugoslavs, the entertaining right winger Danilo Popivoda and midfielder Aleksandar Ristić. Coupled with national team goalkeeper Bernd Franke and other notable players this side played refreshing quality football and often featured right on top of the table. Inside three years Eintracht worked itself up from 9th to 3rd, then just missing out on the championship by one point. In his fourth and last year with the club the 1974 FIFA World Cup winner Paul Breitner joined the team coming from Real Madrid. Even thus reinforced, the team could not maintain the trend and finished a disappointing 13th. By then Zebec's efforts had been successful enough to attract interest elsewhere.

=== Hamburger SV and after ===
The European Cup Winners' Cup winner from 1977 was ambitious and longed for its first championship since 1960 but ended up only 10th in the 77/78 season. Zebec was the right man for the job. In his first season, he formed a competitive unit around wing back Manfred Kaltz, striker Horst Hrubesch. Most important was that he facilitated the integration of "Mighty Mouse" Kevin Keegan who failed to convince in his first season. By the end of Zebec's first year at the helm, Hamburg were champions and Keegan their most prolific striker.

A year later the team progressed all the way into the European Cup final to face Nottingham Forest. A lacklustre Hamburg lost 0–1. Zebec and his coaching methods were widely blamed. Zebec, besides being a strict disciplinarian, believed that when a team plays successfully it can take more training. As it was, the players complained about the harsh training at that late stage of the season, and critics said that it was the reason why Hamburg inside four days of the final also lost a decisive match which consigned them to runners-up in the league.

At the beginning of his third season with Hamburg another problem came to the fore. Branko Zebec had a serious drinking problem and was caught out even on the coaching bench. A funnier consequence was that when he came into the cabin and told his players "0–2, lost! Does not matter, we have to win the next match!" It was only halftime. By December the problem and its consequences which were now frequently recognizable, e.g. when he was dozing on the bench, needed a resolution, and thus by December the contract was terminated. Aleksandar Ristić became his successor for half a year, before Ernst Happel took Hamburg to renewed glory.

By 1981/82 Zebec got himself a new appointment – then with Borussia Dortmund, incidentally here following in the footsteps of Udo Lattek. He led them to place 6th, their best result in 12 years, leading them even into the UEFA Cup. But his personal issues were still increasing and stretched the abilities of the club to deal with him. By the end of the season Borussia saw the need to let him go.

By the beginning of the 82/83 season Branko Zebec had no job. However, this made him available when Eintracht Frankfurt, the club in Germany with the highest attrition rate for coaches, was in need for a replacement of former Austrian national coach Helmut Senekowitsch. Zebec ended the season with Eintracht as 10th, but he himself fell victim to the traditional shortlivedness of coaching jobs by 17 October of the following season.

He had one more ephemeral engagement with his hometown club Dinamo Zagreb before his career ended.

In 1988, he died from alcohol-related illness, aged only 59. He remains one of the most successful coaches in the history of the Bundesliga, having overseen 413 Bundesliga matches, more than any other non-German coach.

=== Managerial statistics ===
Team	From	To	Record				
Team	From	To	G	W	D	L	Win %
Dinamo Zagreb	3 June 1966	1 July 1967	52	27	15	10	51.92
FC Bayern Munich	1 July 1968	13 March 1970	66	39	15	12	59.09
VfB Stuttgart	1 July 1970	18 April 1972	57	23	18	16	40.35
Hajduk Split	1 July 1972	30 June 1973	42	18	4	20	42.86
Eintracht Braunschweig	6 July 1973	30 June 1978	203	102	43	58	50.25
Hamburger SV	1 July 1978	18 December 1980	85	54	17	14	63.53
Borussia Dortmund	1 July 1981	30 June 1982	37	20	5	12	54.05
Eintracht Frankfurt	September 1982	October 1983	39	11	8	20	28.21
Dinamo Zagreb	28 April 1984	1 October 1984	15	5	4	6	33.33
Total			596	299	129	168	50.17

== Honours ==
=== Player ===
Partizan

- Yugoslav Cup: 1952, 1954, 1957

Red Star Belgrade

- Yugoslav First League: 1959–60

=== Manager ===
Bayern Munich

- Bundesliga: 1968–69
- DFB-Pokal: 1969

Eintracht Braunschweig

- Regionalliga: 1973–74

HSV

- Bundesliga: 1978–79
- European Cup runner-up: 1980
