= Zdravko Rajkov =

Yugoslav football manager and player (1927–2006)

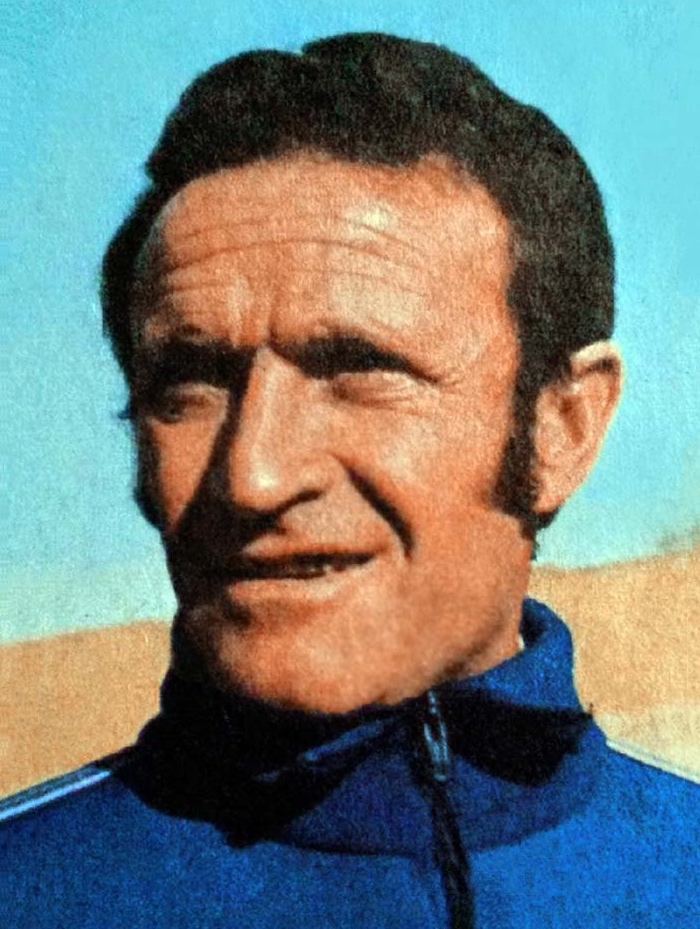
- Rajkov during his time in Iran

Personal information
- Full name: Zdravko Rajkov
- Date of birth: 5 December 1927
- Place of birth: Čurug, Kingdom of Serbs, Croats and Slovenes
- Date of death: 30 July 2006 (aged 78)
- Place of death: Mexico City, Mexico
- Height: 1.77 m (5 ft 10 in)
- Position: Forward

Senior career*
| Years | Team | Apps | (Gls) |
| 1950–1962 | Vojvodina | 230 | (97) |
| 1962–1963 | Lausanne-Sport | 19 | (5) |
| 1963–1966 | Biel-Bienne | 63 | (19) |
| Total | | 312 | (121) |

International career
| 1951–1958 | Yugoslavia | 28 | (11) |

Managerial career
- 1967–1968: Vojvodina
- 1969–1970: Iran
- 1970–1976: Taj
- 1978: Sepahan
- 1979–1981: Algeria
- 1981–1982: Córdoba
Medal record
| Silver medal – second place | Olympic Games | 1952 |
- * Club domestic league appearances and goals

Zdravko Rajkov (Serbian Cyrillic: Здравко Рајков; 5 December 1927 – 30 July 2006) was a Yugoslav football manager and player.

== Club career ==
Rajkov joined Yugoslav Second League club Sloga Novi Sad ahead of the 1950 season, helping them win promotion to the Yugoslav First League, after which the club changed its name back to Vojvodina. He spent the next 12 seasons with the club, amassing 220 appearances and scoring 94 goals in the top flight. In 1962, Rajkov moved abroad to Switzerland and played one season with Lausanne-Sport. He retired after spending three seasons with fellow Swiss club Biel-Bienne.

== International career ==
At international level, Rajkov was capped 28 times for Yugoslavia between 1951 and 1958, scoring 11 goals. He was a member of the national team at the 1952 Summer Olympics, receiving a silver medal without appearing in any games. Rajkov also represented Yugoslavia at the 1958 FIFA World Cup, scoring once in the group stage, as the team eventually exited in the quarter-finals.

== Managerial career ==
After hanging up his boots, Rajkov started his managerial career at Vojvodina in 1967. He was manager of Algeria between 1979 and 1981, finishing as runners-up at the 1980 African Cup of Nations.

== Honours ==
=== Player ===
Yugoslavia

- Olympic Games silver medal: 1952

=== Manager ===
Taj

- Takht Jamshid Cup: 1970–71, 1974–75
- Asian Champion Club Tournament: 1970

Algeria

- African Cup of Nations runner-up: 1980
