= István Zsolt =

Hungarian football referee (1921–1991)

István Zsolt (28 June 1921, Budapest – 7 May 1991) was a Hungarian international football referee. He officiated at the 1954, 1958 and 1966 World Cup tournaments and the Olympic Games of 1952, 1960, 1964 and 1968.
