= Austria national football team results (1930–1959) =

- Win Draw Loss

This is a list of the Austria national football team results from 1930 to 1959.

== 1930 ==
23 March International Friendly	Czechoslovakia	2–2	Austria	Prague, Czechoslovakia
	Svoboda 57'; Junek 87'		Horvath 12' (73)	Stadium: Letenský stadion Attendance: 28,000; Referee: Paul Ruoff (Switzerland)

14 May International Friendly	Austria	0–0	England	Vienna, Austria
				Stadium: Hohe Warte Stadium; Attendance: 28,000; Referee: Johannes Mutters (Netherlands)

1 June International Friendly	Hungary	2–1	Austria	Budapest, Hungary
	Kohut 5'; Turay 56'		Adelbrecht 90'	Stadium: Hungária körúti stadion Attendance: 20,000; Referee: Willem Eijmers (Netherlands)

21 September International Friendly	Austria	2–3	Hungary	Vienna, Austria
	Weselik 26'; Gschweidl 60'		Turay 27', 79'; Titkos 30'	Stadium: Hohe Warte Stadium; Attendance: 50,000; Referee: Albino Carraro (Austria)

16 November International Friendly	Austria	4–1	Sweden	Vienna, Austria
	Gschweidl 40'; Weselik 46'; Schall 65'; Wesely 80'		Engdahl 23'	Stadium: Hohe Warte Stadium; Attendance: 12,000; Referee: Ferenc Majorszky (Hungary)

== 1931 ==
22 February 1931–32 Central European International Cup	Italy	2–1	Austria	Milan, Italy
	Meazza 34'; Orsi 52'		Horvath 4'	Stadium: San Siro; Attendance: 45,000; Referee: Paul Ruoff (Switzerland)

12 April 1931–32 Central European International Cup	Austria	2–1	Czechoslovakia	Vienna, Austria
	Nausch 37'; Horvath 42'		Silný 8'	Stadium: Hohe Warte Stadium; Attendance: 42,000; Referee: Paul Ruoff (Switzerland)

3 May 1931–32 Central European International Cup	Austria	0–0	Hungary	Vienna, Austria
				Stadium: Hohe Warte Stadium; Attendance: 43,000; Referee: René Mercet (Switzerland)

16 May International Friendly	Austria	5–0	Scotland	Vienna, Austria
	Schall 27'; Zischek 29', 69'; Vogl 49'; Sindelar 79'			Stadium: Hohe Warte Stadium; Attendance: 40,000; Referee: Paul Ruoff (Switzerland)

24 May International Friendly	Germany	0–6	Austria	Berlin, Germany
			Schall 6', 32', 70'; Vogl 27'; Zischek 65'; Gschweidl 88'	Stadium: Deutsches Stadion; Attendance: 40,000; Referee: Otto Ohlsson (Sweden)

16 June International Friendly	Austria	2–0	Switzerland	Vienna, Austria
	Gschweidl 59'; Schall 87'			Stadium: Pfarrwiese; Attendance: 10,000; Referee: Julius Brüll (Czechoslovakia)

13 September International Friendly	Austria	5–0	Germany	Vienna, Austria
	Sindelar 2', 69', 76'; Schall 41'; Gschweidl 64'			Stadium: Praterstadion; Attendance: 50,000; Referee: Otto Ohlsson (Sweden)

4 October 1931–32 Central European International Cup	Hungary	2–2	Austria	Budapest, Hungary
	Szabó 42' (pen.); Spitz 65'		Zischek 56', 86'	Stadium: Hungária körúti stadion Attendance: 32,000; Referee: Peco Bauwens (Germany)

29 November 1931–32 Central European International Cup	Switzerland	1–8	Austria	Basel, Switzerland
	Abegglen 32'		Gschweidl 10', 63'; Zischek 33'; Schall 49', 80', 86'; Vogl 58'; Sindelar 61'	Stadium: Stadion Rankhof; Attendance: 25,000; Referee: František Cejnar (Cxechoslovakia)

== 1932 ==
20 March 1931–32 Central European International Cup	Austria	2–1	Italy	Vienna, Austria
	Sindelar 56', 58'		Meazza 66'	Stadium: Praterstadion; Attendance: 63,000; Referee: Paul Ruoff (Switzerland)

24 April International Friendly	Austria	8–2	Hungary	Vienna, Austria
	Sindelar 3', 13', 31'; Schall 33', 50', 70', 73'; Gschweidl 52'		Cseh 14', 44'	Stadium: Hohe Warte Stadium; Attendance: 60,000; Referee: Alfred Birlem (Germany)

22 May 1931–32 Central European International Cup	Czechoslovakia	1–1	Austria	Prague, Czechoslovakia
	Svoboda 36'		Sindelar 2'	Stadium: Letenský stadion Attendance: 30,000; Referee: Moritz Fuchs (Germany)

17 July International Friendly	Sweden	3–4	Austria	Stockholm, Sweden
	Svensson 31'; Nilsson 76', 88'		Vogl 10'; Sindelar 37'; Waitz 75'; Molzer 83'	Stadium: Stockholm Olympic Stadium; Attendance: 15,000; Referee: Sophus Hansen (Denmark)

2 October International Friendly	Hungary	2–3	Austria	Budapest, Hungary
	Kalmár 30'; Déri 47'		Borsányi 39' (o.g.); Müller 54'; Braun 61'	Stadium: Üllői úti stadion Attendance: 28,000; Referee: Rinaldo Barlassina (Italy)

23 October 1931–32 Central European International Cup	Austria	3–1	Switzerland	Vienna, Austria
	Müller 14'; Schall 54', 67'		Abegglen 68'	Stadium: Praterstadion; Attendance: 55,000; Referee: František Cejnar (Czechoslovakia)

7 December International Friendly	England	4–3	Austria	London, England
	Hampson 5', 27'; Houghton 77'; Crooks 82'		Zischek 51', 87'; Sindelar 80'	Stadium: Stamford Bridge; Attendance: 42,000; Referee: John Langenus (Belgium)

11 December International Friendly	Belgium	1–6	Austria	Brussels, Belgium
	Van Landeghem 84'		Schall 19', 28', 42', 67'; Zischek 68'; Weselik 86'	Stadium: Stade du Centenaire; Attendance: 16,000; Referee: George Rudd (England)

== 1933 ==
12 February International Friendly	France	0–4	Austria	Paris, France
			Sindelar 65'; Zischek 69'; Weselik 70'; Vogl 83'	Stadium: Parc des Princes; Attendance: 37,459; Referee: John Langenus (Belgium)

9 April International Friendly	Austria	1–2	Czechoslovakia	Vienna, Austria
	Smistik 86'		Puč 46', 50'	Stadium: Hohe Warte Stadium; Attendance: 61,000; Referee: John Langenus (Belgium)

30 April International Friendly	Hungary	1–1	Austria	Budapest, Hungary
	Markos 85'		Ostermann 35'	Stadium: Üllői úti stadion Attendance: 38,000; Referee: Rinaldo Barlassina (Italy)

11 June International Friendly	Austria	4–1	Belgium	Vienna, Austria
	Ertl 28'; Binder 39', 52'; Sindelar 41'		Voorhoof 26'	Stadium: Praterstadion; Attendance: 42,000; Referee: Thomas Crewe (England)

17 September International Friendly	Czechoslovakia	3–3	Austria	Prague, Czechoslovakia
	Puč 1', 69'; Silný 55'		Müller 39' (o.g.); Sindelar 17', 58'	Stadium: Letenský stadion Attendance: 25,000; Referee: John Langenus (Belgium)

1 October International Friendly	Austria	2–2	Hungary	Vienna, Austria
	Müller 15'; Schall 34'		Avar 82'; Polgár 85'	Stadium: Praterstadion; Attendance: 60,000; Referee: Francesco Mattea (Italy)

29 November International Friendly	Scotland	2–2	Austria	Glasgow, Scotland
	Meiklejohn 5'; MacFadyen 49'		Zischek 39'; Schall 52'	Stadium: Hampden Park; Attendance: 62,000; Referee: John Langenus (Belgium)

10 December International Friendly	Netherlands	0–1	Austria	Amsterdam, Netherlands
			Bican 48'	Stadium: Olympic Stadium; Attendance: 34,000; Referee: George Rudd (England)

== 1934 ==
11 February 1933–35 Central European International Cup	Italy	2–4	Austria	Turin, Italy
	Guaita 48' (pen.), 50'		Zischek 19', 23', 55'; Binder 28'	Stadium: Stadio Municipale; Attendance: 54,000; Referee: René Mercet (Switzerland)

25 March 1933–35 Central European International Cup	Switzerland	2–3	Austria	Geneva, Switzerland
	Bossi 58'; Kielholz 68'		Bican 16', 76'; Kaburek 46'	Stadium: Charmilles Stadium; Attendance: 25,000; Referee: Stanley Rous (England)

15 April 1934 FIFA World Cup qualification	Austria	6–1	Bulgaria	Vienna, Austria
	Horvath 19', 22', 33'; Zischek 59'; Viertl 62'; Sindelar 67'		Lozanov 66'; Gabrovski (red card) 71'	Stadium: Praterstadion; Attendance: 25,000; Referee: František Cejnar (Czechoslovakia)

27 May 1934 FIFA World Cup; R16	Austria	3–2 (a.e.t.)	France	Turin, Italy
	Sindelar 45'; Schall 93'; Bican 93'		Nicolas 18'; Verriest 115' (pen.)	Stadium: Stadio Municipale; Attendance: 10,000; Referee: Joop van Moorsel (Netherlands)

31 May 1934 FIFA World Cup; QF	Austria	2–1	Hungary	Bologna, Italy
	Horvath 7'; Zischek 51'		Sárosi 60' (pen.); Markos (red card) 57'	Stadium: Stadio Littoriale; Attendance: 14,000; Referee: Francesco Mattea (Italy)

3 June 1934 FIFA World Cup; SF	Italy	1–0	Austria	Milan, Italy
	Guaita 19'			Stadium: San Siro; Attendance: 60,000; Referee: Ivan Eklind (Sweden)

29 November 1934 FIFA World Cup; 3P	Austria	2–3	Germany	Naples, Italy
	Horvath 30'; Sesta 55'		Lehner 1', 42'; Conen 29'	Stadium: Stadio Giorgio Ascarelli; Attendance: 7,000; Referee: Albino Carraro (Italy)

23 September 1933–35 Central European International Cup	Austria	2–2	Czechoslovakia	Vienna, Austria
	Binder 4'; Vogl 31'		Čech 59', 86'	Stadium: Praterstadion; Attendance: 50,000; Referee: Rinaldo Barlassina (Italy)

7 October 1933–35 Central European International Cup	Hungary	3–1	Austria	Budapest, Hungary
	Sárosi 34', 47'; Toldi 84'		Zischek 17'	Stadium: Hungária körúti stadion Attendance: 33,000; Referee: Rinaldo Barlassina (Italy)

7 October 1933–35 Central European International Cup	Austria	3–0	Switzerland	Vienna, Austria
	Kaburek 3'; Skoumal 6'; Zischek 46'			Stadium: Praterstadion; Attendance: 30,000; Referee: Gustav Krist (Czechoslovakia)

== 1935 ==
24 March 1933–35 Central European International Cup	Austria	0–2	Italy	Vienna, Austria
			Piola 51', 81'	Stadium: Praterstadion; Attendance: 60,000; Referee: Walter Lewington (England)

14 April 1933–35 Central European International Cup	Czechoslovakia	0–0	Austria	Prague, Czechoslovakia
				Stadium: Letenský stadion Attendance: 25,000; Referee: Rinaldo Barlassina (Italy)

12 May International Friendly	Austria	5–2	Poland	Vienna, Austria
	Stoiber 12'; Vogl 25', 71'; Hahnemann 31'; Pesser 46'		Matyas 44', 63'	Stadium: Praterstadion; Attendance: 16,000; Referee: Hertzka Pál (Hungary)

12 May International Friendly	Hungary	6–3	Austria	Budapest, Hungary
	Titkos 5', 15', (red card) 88'; Sárosi 7', 73', 76'; Toldi 80'		Zischek 17', 28'; Durspekt 58'	Stadium: Üllői úti stadion Attendance: 32,000; Referee: Rinaldo Barlassina (Italy)

6 October International Friendly	Poland	1–0	Austria	Warsaw, Poland
	Matyas 34'			Stadium: Stadion Wojska Polskiego; Attendance: 25,000; Referee: Juris Rēdlihs (Latvia)

6 October 1933–35 Central European International Cup	Austria	4–4	Hungary	Vienna, Austria
	Toldi 6'; Vincze 8', 30'; Sárosi 21'		Bican 7', 11', 58'; Hofmann 66'	Stadium: Praterstadion; Attendance: 40,000; Referee: Karl Wunderlin (Switzerland)

== 1936 ==
19 January International Friendly	Spain	4–5	Austria	Madrid, Spain
	Lángara 26', 48'; Regueiro 28', 61'		Zischek 4'; Binder 31'; Bican 58'; Hanreiter 69', 73'	Stadium: Estadio Metropolitano de Madrid; Attendance: 40,000; Referee: John Langenus (Belgium)

26 January International Friendly	Portugal	2–3	Austria	Porto, Portugal
	Nunes 47'; Soeiro 61'		Zischek 25'; Binder 41'; Bican 50'	Stadium: Estádio do Lima; Attendance: 23,000; Referee: Ramón Melcón (Spain)

22 March 1936–38 Central European International Cup	Austria	1–1	Czechoslovakia	Vienna, Austria
	Bican 73' (pen.)		Zajíček 59'	Stadium: Praterstadion; Attendance: 53,000; Referee: Francesco Mattea (Italy)

5 April International Friendly	Austria	3–5	Hungary	Vienna, Austria
	Zischek 17'; Bican 46', 88'		Cseh 16', 23'; Kállai 35', 72', 87'	Stadium: Hohe Warte Stadium; Attendance: 40,000; Referee: Lucien Leclerq (France)

6 May International Friendly	Austria	2–1	England	Vienna, Austria
	Viertl 12'; Geiter 17'		Camsell 54'	Stadium: Praterstadion; Attendance: 60,000; Referee: John Langenus (Belgium)

17 May International Friendly	Italy	2–2	Austria	Rome, Italy
	Demaria 64'; Pasinati 78'		Jerusalem 28'; Viertl 72'	Stadium: Stadio del Partito Nazionale Fascista; Attendance: 20,000; Referee: Pál Hertzka (Hungary)

27 September 1936–38 Central European International Cup	Hungary	5–3	Austria	Budapest, Hungary
	Toldi 15', 29', 63'; Cseh 40'; Titkos 72'	Report	Binder 2'; Sindelar 27', 64'	Stadium: Üllői úti stadion Attendance: 25,000; Referee: Lucien Leclerq (France)

8 November 1936–38 Central European International Cup	Switzerland	1–3	Austria	Zürich, Hungary
	Sesta o.g.'	Report	Hahnemann ??'; Binder ??', ??'	Stadium: Letzigrund; Referee: Karl Weingartner

== 1937 ==
21 March 1936–38 Central European International Cup	Austria	2–0 match abandoned after 73'	Italy	Vienna, Austria
	Jerusalem 40', (red card) 47'; Stroh 63' (pen.)			Stadium: Praterstadion; Attendance: 52,000; Referee: Carl Olsson (Sweden)

9 May International Friendly	Austria	1–1	Scotland	Vienna, Austria
	Jerusalem 76'		O'Donnell 78'	Stadium: Praterstadion; Attendance: 62,000; Referee: John Langenus (Belgium)

23 May International Friendly	Hungary	2–2	Austria	Budapest, Hungary
	Sas 2'; Cseh 85'		Pesser 13', 45'	Stadium: Üllői úti stadion Attendance: 17,000; Referee: John Langenus (Belgium)

5 April 1936–38 Central European International Cup	Austria	4–3	Switzerland	Vienna, Austria
	Sindelar 2'; Jerusalem 8', 28'; Geiter 39'		Walaschek 36'; Aeby 41'; Aeby 77'	Stadium: Praterstadion; Attendance: 33,000; Referee: Mika Popović (Yugoslavia)

6 May 1938 FIFA World Cup qualification	Austria	2–1	Latvia	Vienna, Austria
	Jerusalem 15'; Binder 33'		Vestermans 6'	Stadium: Praterstadion; Attendance: 16,000; Referee: Pál Hertzka (Hungary)

10 October 1936–38 Central European International Cup	Austria	1–2	Hungary	Vienna, Austria
	Stroh 76'		Sárosi 21'; Cseh 78'	Stadium: Praterstadion; Attendance: 44,000; Referee: Charles Argent (England)

24 October 1936–38 Central European International Cup	Czechoslovakia	2–1	Austria	Prague, Czechoslovakia
	Říha 75'; Kloz 76'		Neumer 18'	Stadium: Letenský stadion Attendance: 35,000; Referee: Pál Hertzka (Hungary)

== 1945 ==
19 August International Friendly	Hungary	2–0	Austria	Budapest, Hungary
	Rudas 18'; Zsengellér 32'			Stadium: Üllői úti stadion Attendance: 40,000; Referee: György Szigeti (Hungary)

20 August International Friendly	Hungary	5–2	Austria	Budapest, Hungary
	Puskás 12'; Szusza 13', 56'; Zsengellér 15'; Vincze 38'		Kominek 22'; Decker 44'	Stadium: Üllői úti stadion Attendance: 20,000; Referee: Pál Hertzka (Hungary)

23 May International Friendly	Austria	4–1	France	Vienna, Austria
	Decker 14', 16', 79'; Neumer 68'		Bongiorni 8'	Stadium: Praterstadion; Attendance: 55,000; Referee: Jean Lutz (Switzerland)

== 1946 ==
14 April International Friendly	Austria	3–2	Hungary	Vienna, Austria
	Decker 24', 85'; Melchior 71'		Nyers 6'; Zsengellér 25'	Stadium: Praterstadion; Attendance: 60,000; Referee: Jaroslav Vlček (Czechoslovakia)

5 May International Friendly	France	3–1	Austria	Colombes, France
	Vaast 66'; Heisserer 83'; Leduc 86'		Hahnemann 23'	Stadium: Stade Olympique Yves-du-Manoir; Attendance: 57,205; Referee: Paul von Wartburg (Switzerland)

6 October International Friendly	Hungary	2–0	Austria	Budapest, Hungary
	Deák 11', 33'			Stadium: Üllői úti stadion Attendance: 35,000; Referee: Mika Popović (Yugoslavia)

27 October International Friendly	Austria	3–4	Czechoslovakia	Vienna, Austria
	Binder 40', 55'; Kaspirek 90'		Zachar 19', 86'; Cejp 65', 71'	Stadium: Praterstadion; Attendance: 56,000; Referee: Laurent Franken (Belgium)

10 November International Friendly	Switzerland	1–0	Austria	Bern, Switzerland
	Pasteur 88'			Stadium: Wankdorf Stadium; Attendance: 30,000; Referee: Charles de la Salle (France)

1 December International Friendly	Italy	3–2	Austria	Milan, Italy
	Castigliano 8'; Mazzola 16'; Piola 64'		Epp 40'; Stojaspal 90'	Stadium: San Siro; Attendance: 53,000; Referee: Eugène Scherz (Switzerland)

== 1947 ==
4 May International Friendly	Hungary	5–2	Austria	Budapest, Hungary
	Puskás 11'; Egresi 12'; Szusza 49', 65'; Bortoli 88' (o.g.)		Epp 18', 44'	Stadium: Üllői úti stadion Attendance: 37,000; Referee: Marijan Matančić (Yugoslavia)

14 September International Friendly	Austria	4–3	Hungary	Vienna, Austria
	Körner 22'; Hahnemann 30'; Binder 66' (pen.), 77'		Szusza 40', 49', 55'	Stadium: Praterstadion; Attendance: 60,000; Referee: Giovanni Galeati (Italy)

5 October International Friendly	Czechoslovakia	3–2	Austria	Prague, Czechoslovakia
	Říha 36', 60'; Baláži 51'		Binder 45'; Stojaspal 66'	Stadium: Letenský stadion Attendance: 53,000; Referee: Generoso Dattilo (Italy)

9 November International Friendly	Austria	5–1	Italy	Vienna, Austria
	Körner 24'; Ocwirk 31'; Brinek 36', 76'; Stojaspal 69'		Carapellese 89'	Stadium: Praterstadion; Attendance: 60,000; Referee: Jan Roškota (Czechoslovakia)

== 1948 ==
18 April International Friendly	Austria	3–1	Switzerland	Vienna, Austria
	Epp 30', 48'; Melchior 35'		Fatton 70'	Stadium: Praterstadion; Attendance: 56,000; Referee: Giuseppe Carpani (Italy)

2 May 1948–53 Central European International Cup	Austria	3–2	Hungary	Vienna, Austria
	Melchior 20'; Wagner 67' (pen.); Körner 84'		Szusza 15'; Deák 48'	Stadium: Praterstadion; Attendance: 57,000; Referee: Jaroslav Vlček (Czechoslovakia)

30 May International Friendly	Turkey	0–1	Austria	Istanbul, Turkey
			Körner 64'	Stadium: Dolmabahçe Stadium; Attendance: 25,000; Referee: Giovanni Galeati (Italy)

11 July International Friendly	Sweden	3–2	Austria	Solna, Sweden
	Liedholm 20'; Gren 32', 80'		Habitzl 4', 65'	Stadium: Råsunda Stadium; Attendance: 37,000; Referee: Ernst Hansen (Denmark)

3 October International Friendly	Hungary	2–1	Austria	Budapest, Hungary
	Deák 16'; Szusza 30'		Melchior 41'	Stadium: Megyeri úti stadion Attendance: 30,000; Referee: Jaroslav Vlček (Czechoslovakia)

31 October 1948–53 Central European International Cup	Czechoslovakia	3–1	Austria	Bratislava, Czechoslovakia
	Hemele 55', 66'; Hlaváček 85'		Stroh 15'	Stadium: Tehelné pole Attendance: 35,000; Referee: Árpád Kamarás (Hungary)

14 November International Friendly	Austria	2–1	Sweden	Vienna, Austria
	Wagner 36'; Habitzl 83'		Gren 88' (pen.)	Stadium: Praterstadion; Attendance: 60,000; Referee: Giovanni Galeati (Italy)

== 1949 ==
20 March International Friendly	Austria	1–0	Turkey	Vienna, Austria
	Decker 45'			Stadium: Praterstadion; Attendance: 62,000; Referee: Giuseppe Carpani (Italy)

3 April 1948–53 Central European International Cup	Switzerland	1–2	Austria	Lausanne, Switzerland
	Bickel 88'		Habitzl 15', 81'	Stadium: Stade olympique de la Pontaise; Attendance: 25,000; Referee: Victor Sdez (France)

8 May 1948–53 Central European International Cup	Hungary	6–1	Austria	Budapest, Hungary
	Deák 2', 49'; Kocsis 22'; Puskás 32', 82' (pen.), 89'		Melchior 79'	Stadium: Megyeri úti stadion Attendance: 50,000; Referee: Jaroslav Vlček (Czechoslovakia)

22 May 1948–53 Central European International Cup	Italy	3–1	Austria	Florence, Italy
	Cappello 26'; Amadei 42'; Boniperti 43'		Huber 70'	Stadium: Stadio Comunale; Attendance: 85,000; Referee: Jean Lutz (Switzerland)

25 September 1948–53 Central European International Cup	Austria	3–1	Czechoslovakia	Vienna, Austria
	Decker 33', 82' (pen.); Huber 67'		Šimanský 52'	Stadium: Praterstadion; Attendance: 60,000; Referee: Giuseppe Carpani (Italy)

16 October International Friendly	Austria	3–4	Hungary	Vienna, Austria
	Decker 2', 49' (pen.); Dienst 33'		Puskás 9', 74' (pen.); Deák 23', 27'	Stadium: Praterstadion; Attendance: 65,000; Referee: William Evans (England)

13 November International Friendly	Yugoslavia	2–5	Austria	Belgrade, Yugoslavia
	Čajkovski 35'; Bobek 61'		Decker 24', 28', 69'; Huber 38', 73'	Stadium: Partizan Stadium; Attendance: 50,000; Referee: Agostino Gamba (Italy)

== 1950 ==
19 March 1948–53 Central European International Cup	Austria	3–3	Switzerland	Vienna, Austria
	Ocwirk 11'; Körner 14'; Decker 32' (pen.)		Fatton 41'; Tamini 51'; Oberer 86'	Stadium: Praterstadion; Attendance: 62,000; Referee: Giovanni Galeati (Italy)

2 April 1948–53 Central European International Cup	Austria	1–0	Italy	Vienna, Austria
	Melchior 52'			Stadium: Praterstadion; Attendance: 63,000; Referee: Harry Pearce (England)

14 May International Friendly	Austria	5–3	Hungary	Vienna, Austria
	Dienst 7'; Decker 19' (pen.), 68'; Aurednik 47'; Melchior 72'		Kocsis 16'; Puskás 25' (pen.); Szilágyi 63'	Stadium: Praterstadion; Attendance: 65,000; Referee: Gunnar Dahlner (Sweden)

8 October International Friendly	Austria	7–2	Yugoslavia	Vienna, Austria
	Decker 15'; Stojaspal 21', 68'; Wagner 31'; Aurednik 50'; Melchior 59', 86'		Mitić 34'; Živanović 74'	Stadium: Praterstadion; Attendance: 60,000; Referee: Jean Lutz (Switzerland)

29 October International Friendly	Hungary	4–3	Austria	Budapest, Hungary
	Puskás 10', 13', 90'; Szilágyi 67'		Wagner 24', 52'; Melchior 85'	Stadium: Megyeri úti stadion Attendance: 45,000; Referee: Arthur Blythe (England)

16 October International Friendly	Austria	3–4	Hungary	Vienna, Austria
	Decker 2', 49' (pen.); Dienst 33'		Puskás 9', 74' (pen.); Deák 23', 27'	Stadium: Praterstadion; Attendance: 65,000; Referee: William Evans (England)

5 November International Friendly	Austria	5–1	Denmark	Vienna, Austria
	Melchior 5'; Wagner 19', 21', 44'; Aurednik 72'		Jensen 15'	Stadium: Praterstadion; Attendance: 50,000; Referee: Leo Lemešić (Yugoslavia)

13 December International Friendly	Scotland	0–1	Austria	Glasgow, Scotland
			Melchior 26'	Stadium: Hampden Park; Attendance: 68,000; Referee: William Ling (England)

== 1951 ==
27 May International Friendly	Austria	4–0	Scotland	Vienna, Austria
	Hanappi 42', 56'; Wagner 70' (pen.), 87'		Steel (red card) 82'	Stadium: Praterstadion; Attendance: 65,000; Referee: Jean Lutz (Switzerland)

17 June International Friendly	Denmark	3–3	Austria	Copenhagen, Denmark
	Jensen 52', 65'; Lundberg 53'		Melchior 24'; Wagner 33'; Riegler 68'	Stadium: Københavns Idrætspark; Attendance: 23,300; Referee: Maurice Hamus (Luxembourg)

23 September International Friendly	Austria	0–2	West Germany	Vienna, Austria
			Morlock 55'; Haferkamp 87'	Stadium: Praterstadion; Attendance: 60,000; Referee: William Evans (England)

14 October International Friendly	Belgium	1–8	Austria	Brussels, Belgium
	Lemberechts 8'		Huber 30', 50'; Stojaspal 44', 63'; Melchior 62', 87'; Körner 76'; Hanappi 88'	Stadium: Heysel Stadium; Attendance: 55,156; Referee: Arthur Edward Ellis (England)

1 November International Friendly	France	2–2	Austria	Colombes, France
	Grumellon 3', 45'		Körner 12'; Stojaspal 15'	Stadium: Stade Olympique Yves-du-Manoir; Attendance: 61,687; Referee: William Ling (England)

28 November International Friendly	England	2–2	Austria	London, England
	Ramsey 68' (pen.); Lofthouse 75'		Melchior 46'; Stojaspal 77' (pen.)	Stadium: Wembley; Attendance: 100,000; Referee: Jack Mowat (Scotland)

== 1952 ==
23 March International Friendly	Austria	2–0	Belgium	Vienna, Austria
	Stojaspal 60', 63'			Stadium: Praterstadion; Attendance: 58,000; Referee: Miljenko Podubsky (Switzerland)

7 May International Friendly	Austria	6–0	Republic of Ireland	Vienna, Austria
	Huber 22', 24', 26'; Haummer 36'; Dienst 58', 81'			Stadium: Praterstadion; Attendance: 64,000; Referee: Alois Reinhardt (West Germany)

25 May International Friendly	Austria	2–3	England	Vienna, Austria
	Huber 27' (pen.); Dienst 42'		Lofthouse 25', 83'; Sewell 28'	Stadium: Praterstadion; Attendance: 65,000; Referee: Giuseppe Carpani (Italy)

22 June International Friendly	Switzerland	1–1	Austria	Geneva, Switzerland
	Riva 79'		Decker 40'	Stadium: Charmilles Stadium; Attendance: 20,000; Referee: Helmut Finck (West Germany)

21 September International Friendly	Yugoslavia	4–2	Austria	Belgrade, Yugoslavia
	Bobek 14', 51', 87' (pen.); Vukas 56'		Körner 63'; Cejka 73'	Stadium: Partizan Stadium; Attendance: 50,000; Referee: William Evans (England)

19 October International Friendly	Austria	1–2	France	Vienna, Austria
	Walzhofer 47' (pen.)		Baratte 10'; Penverne 26'	Stadium: Praterstadion; Attendance: 65,000; Referee: Arthur Ellis (England)

23 November International Friendly	Portugal	1–1	Austria	Porto, Portugal
	Travassos 32'		Halla 71'	Stadium: Estádio das Antas; Attendance: 50,000; Referee: Ernst Dörflinger (Switzerland)

== 1953 ==
22 March International Friendly	West Germany	0–0	Austria	Cologne, West Germany
				Stadium: Müngersdorfer Stadion; Attendance: 76,000; Referee: Henri Bauwens (Belgium)

25 March International Friendly	Republic of Ireland	4–0	Austria	Dublin, Ireland
	Ringstead 47', 54'; Eglington 73'; O'Farrell 82'			Stadium: Dalymount Park; Attendance: 40,000; Referee: Arthur Edward Ellis (England)

26 April International Friendly	Hungary	1–1	Austria	Budapest, Hungary
	Czibor 43'		Hinesser 16'	Stadium: Megyeri úti stadion Attendance: 44,000; Referee: William Evans (England)

27 September International Friendly	Switzerland	1–1	Austria	Geneva, Switzerland
	Riva 79'		Decker 40'	Stadium: Charmilles Stadium; Attendance: 20,000; Referee: Helmut Finck (West Germany)

21 September 1954 FIFA World Cup qualification Group 5	Austria	9–1	Portugal	Vienna, Austria
	Ocwirk 13'; Probst 14', 19', 31', 59', 70'; Happel 68' (pen.); Wagner 83'; Dienst 87'		Águas 60'	Stadium: Praterstadion; Attendance: 60,000; Referee: Henri Bauwens (Belgium)

11 October International Friendly	Austria	2–3	Hungary	Vienna, Austria
	Happel 55'; Wagner 85'		Csordás 57'; Hidegkuti 65', 74'	Stadium: Praterstadion; Attendance: 65,000; Referee: René Baumberger (Switzerland)

29 November 1954 FIFA World Cup qualification Group 5	Portugal	0–0	Austria	Lisbon, Portugal
				Stadium: Estádio Nacional; Attendance: 60,000; Referee: Louis Fauquemberghe (France)

== 1954 ==
11 April International Friendly	Austria	0–1	Hungary	Vienna, Austria
			Happel 43' (o.g.)	Stadium: Praterstadion; Attendance: 65,000; Referee: Giorgio Bernardi (Italy)

9 May International Friendly	Austria	2–0	Wales	Vienna, Austria
	Dienst 50'; Halla 81'			Stadium: Praterstadion; Attendance: 58,000; Referee: Louis Fauquemberghe (France)

30 May International Friendly	Austria	5–0	Norway	Vienna, Austria
	Schleger 48'; Happel 53'; Probst 61', 68'; Karlsen 76' (o.g.)			Stadium: Praterstadion; Attendance: 46,000; Referee: Albert Meißner (West Germany)

16 June 1954 FIFA World Cup Group 3	Austria	1–0	Scotland	Zürich, Switzerland
	Probst 32'			Stadium: Hardturm; Attendance: 25,000; Referee: Laurent Franken (Belgium)

19 June 1954 FIFA World Cup Group 3	Austria	5–0	Czechoslovakia	Zürich, Switzerland
	Stojaspal 3', 65'; Probst 4', 21', 24'			Stadium: Hardturm; Attendance: 21,000; Referee: Vasa Stefanović (Yugoslavia)

26 June 1954 FIFA World Cup Group 3	Switzerland	5–7	Austria	Lausanne, Switzerland
	Ballaman 16', 37'; Hügi 17', 19', 58'		Wagner 25', 27', 53'; Körner 26', 34'; Ocwirk 31'; Probst 75'	Stadium: Stade olympique de la Pontaise; Attendance: 30,340; Referee: Charles Faultless (Scotland)

30 June 1954 FIFA World Cup; SF	Austria	1–6	West Germany	Basel, Switzerland
	Probst 52'		Schäfer 32'; Morlock 47'; F. Walter 55' (pen.), 66' (pen.); O. Walter 64', 88'	Stadium: St. Jakob Stadium; Attendance: 57,000; Referee: Vincenzo Orlandini (Italy)

3 July 1954 FIFA World Cup; 3P	Austria	3–1	Uruguay	Zürich, Switzerland
	Stojaspal 16' (pen.); Cruz 59' (o.g.); Ocwirk 79'		Hohberg 22'	Stadium: Hardturm; Attendance: 31,000; Referee: Paul Wyssling (Switzerland)

3 October International Friendly	Austria	2–2	Yugoslavia	Vienna, Austria
	Walzhofer 3'; Haummer 50'		Stanković 18'; Bobek 31'	Stadium: Praterstadion; Attendance: 60,000; Referee: Leo Horn (Netherlands)

31 October International Friendly	Sweden	2–1	Austria	Stockholm, Sweden
	Sandell 4'; Eriksson 86'		Wagner 70'	Stadium: Råsunda Stadium; Attendance: 37,019; Referee: Leo Horn (Netherlands)

14 November International Friendly	Hungary	4–1	Austria	Budapest, Hungary
	Czibor 8'; Palotás 51'; Kocsis 67'; Sándor 80'		Hanappi 23'	Stadium: Népstadion; Attendance: 94,000; Referee: Vincenzo Orlandini (Italy)

== 1955 ==
27 March 1955–60 Central European International Cup	Czechoslovakia	3–2	Austria	Brno, Czechoslovakia
	Procházka 6'; Crha 33' (pen.); Pešek 52'		Probst 35'; Dienst 42'	Stadium: Stadion Jana Švermy; Attendance: 45,000; Referee: Leo Lemešić (Yugoslavia)

24 April 1955–60 Central European International Cup	Austria	2–2	Hungary	Vienna, Austria
	Probst 11', 30'		Fenyvesi 7'; Hidegkuti 29'	Stadium: Praterstadion; Attendance: 65,000; Referee: Vasilis Diamantopoulos (Greece)

1 May International Friendly	Switzerland	2–3	Austria	Bern, Switzerland
	Hügi 21'; Vonlanthen 42'		Hofbauer 27'; Brousek 54' (pen.); Probst 58'	Stadium: Wankdorf Stadium; Attendance: 40,000; Referee: Vincenzo Orlandini (Italy)

19 May International Friendly	Austria	1–4	Scotland	Vienna, Austria
	Ocwirk 87'		Robertson 1'; Smith 43'; Liddell 70'; Reilly 90'	Stadium: Praterstadion; Attendance: 65,000; Referee: Giorgio Bernardi (Italy)

16 October 1955–60 Central European International Cup	Hungary	6–1	Austria	Népstadion, Budapest
	Tichy 1'; Kocsis 60'; Czibor 65', 81'; Tóth 67'; Puskás 84'		Grohs 53'	Stadium: Hardturm; Attendance: 104,000; Referee: Karel van der Meer (Netherlands)

30 October 1955–60 Central European International Cup	Austria	2–1	Yugoslavia	Vienna, Austria
	Grohs 18'; Hanappi 48'		Milutinović 26'	Stadium: Praterstadion; Attendance: 65,000; Referee: Francesco Liverani (Italy)

23 November International Friendly	Wales	1–2	Austria	Wrexham, Wales
	Tapscott 35'		Wagner 5'; Hanappi 20'	Stadium: Racecourse Ground; Attendance: 39,000; Referee: Louis Fauquemberghe (France)

== 1956 ==
25 March International Friendly	France	3–1	Austria	Colombes, France
	Leblond 15'; Vincent 30'; Piantoni 68'		Hanappi 49'	Stadium: Stade Olympique Yves-du-Manoir; Attendance: 42,223; Referee: Arthur Ellis (England)

15 April International Friendly	Austria	2–3	Brazil	Vienna, Austria
	Sabetzer 16', 77'		Gino 73'; Zózimo 75'; Didi 87'	Stadium: Praterstadion; Attendance: 55,000; Referee: Veljko Romčević (Yugoslavia)

2 May International Friendly	Scotland	1–1	Austria	Glasgow, Swcotland
	Conn 12'		Wagner 13'	Stadium: Hampden Park; Attendance: 80,509; Referee: Jan Bronkhorst (Netherlands)

17 June 1955–60 Central European International Cup	Yugoslavia	1–1	Austria	Zagreb, Yugoslavia
	Rajkov 60'		Koller 55'	Stadium: Stadion Maksimir; Attendance: 30,000; Referee: Sándor Harangozó (Hungary)

30 September 1958 FIFA World Cup qualification Group 5	Austria	7–0	Luxembourg	Vienna, Austria
	Hanappi 18', 25'; Walzhofer 51'; Wagner 62', 77'; Kozlicek 71'; Haummer 79'			Stadium: Praterstadion; Attendance: 47,000; Referee: Francesco Liverani (Italy)

14 October International Friendly	Austria	0–2	Hungary	Vienna, Austria
			Puskás 26'; Sándor 65'	Stadium: Praterstadion; Attendance: 65,000; Referee: Paul Wyssling (Switzerland)

9 December 1955–60 Central European International Cup	Italy	2–1	Austria	Genoa, Italy
	Longoni 37', 48'		Körner 55'	Stadium: Stadio Luigi Ferraris; Attendance: 55,000; Referee: Emilio Guidi (Switzerland)

== 1957 ==
10 March International Friendly	Austria	2–3	West Germany	Vienna, Austria
	Wagner 58' (pen.); Buzek 74'		Rahn 25', 69'; Kraus 34'	Stadium: Praterstadion; Attendance: 67,000; Referee: Jan Bronkhorst (Netherlands)

14 April 1955–60 Central European International Cup	Austria	4–0	Switzerland	Vienna, Austria
	Buzek 8', 53'; Haummer 62'; Koller 77'		Hügi (red card) 78'	Stadium: Praterstadion; Attendance: 65,000; Referee: Vasa Stefanović (Yugoslavia)

5 May International Friendly	Austria	1–0	Sweden	Vienna, Austria
	Dienst 21'			Stadium: Praterstadion; Attendance: 62,000; Referee: Jaroslav Vlček (Czechoslovakia)

26 May 1958 FIFA World Cup qualification Group 5	Austria	3–2	Netherlands	Vienna, Austria
	Koller 47'; Buzek 80'; Stotz 87'		van Melis 31', 32'	Stadium: Praterstadion; Attendance: 54,207; Referee: Emil Schmetzer (West Germany)

15 September International Friendly	Yugoslavia	3–3	Austria	Belgrade, Yugoslavia
	Rajkov 15'; Koller 20' (o.g.); Milutinović 70'		Happel 32' (pen.); Dienst 45', 62'	Stadium: Partizan Stadium; Attendance: 50,000; Referee: Vincenzo Orlandini (Italy)

25 September 1958 FIFA World Cup qualification Group 5	Netherlands	1–1	Austria	Amsterdam, Netherlands
	Lenstra 63'		Hanappi 29'	Stadium: Olympic Stadium; Attendance: 65,000; Referee: Arthur Ellis (England)

29 September 1958 FIFA World Cup qualification Group 5	Luxembourg	0–3	Austria	Luxembourg, Luxembourg
			Dienst 20'; Kozlicek 48'; Senekowitsch 86'	Stadium: Stade Josy Barthel; Attendance: 55,000; Referee: Gérard Versyp (Belgium)

13 October 1955–60 Central European International Cup	Austria	2–2	Czechoslovakia	Vienna, Austria
	Körner 30'; Senekowitsch 54'		Moravčík 5', 7'	Stadium: Praterstadion; Attendance: 55,000; Referee: Gottfried Dienst (Switzerland)

== 1958 ==
23 March 1955–60 Central European International Cup	Austria	3–2	Italy	Vienna, Austria
	Kozlicek 41'; Körner 79'; Buzek 82'		Petris 47'; Firmani 61'	Stadium: Praterstadion; Attendance: 60,000; Referee: Gérard Versyp (Belgium)

14 May International Friendly	Austria	3–1	Republic of Ireland	Vienna, Austria
	Körner 18'; Buzek 58'; Hamerl 77'		Curtis 70'	Stadium: Praterstadion; Attendance: 35,000; Referee: Paul Wyssling (Switzerland)

8 June 1958 FIFA World Cup; Group 4	Austria	0–3	Brazil	Uddevalla, Sweden
			Mazola 37', 80'; Nílton Santos 48'	Stadium: Rimnersvallen; Attendance: 17,778; Referee: Maurice Guigue (France)

11 June 1958 FIFA World Cup; Group 4	Austria	0–2	Soviet Union	Borås, Sweden
			Ilyin 15'; Ivanov 63'	Stadium: Ryavallen; Attendance: 21,239; Referee: Carl Frederik Jørgensen (Denmark)

15 June 1958 FIFA World Cup; Group 4	Austria	2–2	England	Borås, Sweden
	Koller 16'; Körner 71'		Haynes 56'; Kevan 74'	Stadium: Ryavallen; Attendance: 15,872; Referee: Jan Bronkhorst (Netherlands)

14 September International Friendly	Austria	3–4	Yugoslavia	Vienna, Austria
	Happel 7'; Ninaus 18'; Körner 25'		Veselinović 31', 68', 70'; Mujić 62'	Stadium: Praterstadion; Attendance: 65,000; Referee: Louis Fauquemberghe (France)

5 October International Friendly	Austria	1–2	France	Vienna, Austria
	Hof 21'		Deladerrière 54'; Fontaine 56'	Stadium: Praterstadion; Attendance: 71,000; Referee: Cesare Jonni (Italy)

19 November International Friendly	West Germany	2–2	Austria	West Berlin, West Germany
	Rahn 16', 89'		Horak 42'; Knoll 61'	Stadium: Olympiastadion; Attendance: 85,000; Referee: Milan Fencl (Czechoslovakia)

== 1959 ==
20 May 1960 European Nations' Cup qualifying 1R 1L	Norway	0–1	Austria	Oslo, Norway
			Hof 32'	Stadium: Ullevaal Stadion; Attendance: 27,566; Referee: Werner Bergmann (East Germany)

24 May International Friendly	Belgium	0–2	Austria	Brussels, Belgium
			Skerlan 11'; Huberts 55'	Stadium: Heysel Stadium; Attendance: 32,300; Referee: Karol Galba (Czechoslovakia)

14 June International Friendly	Austria	4–2	Belgium	Vienna, Austria
	Skerlan 17'; Hof 59' (pen.), 62'; Horak 88'		van den Boer 4'; Coppens 38'	Stadium: Praterstadion; Attendance: 35,000; Referee: Daniel Mellet (Switzerland)

23 September 1960 European Nations' Cup qualifying 1R 2L	Austria	5–2	Norway	Vienna, Austria
	Hof 2', 26' (pen.); Nemec 21', 73'; Skerlan 60'		Ødegaard 20', 35'	Stadium: Praterstadion; Attendance: 34,989; Referee: Dimosthenis Stathatos (Greece)

22 November International Friendly	Spain	6–3	Austria	Valencia, Spain
	Di Stéfano 10', 63'; Suárez 14', 27' (pen.); Martínez 50'; Mateos 79'		Hof 40'; Senekowitsch 56'; Knoll 86'	Stadium: Mestalla Stadium; Attendance: 60,000; Referee: Pierre Schwinte (France)

13 December 1960 European Nations' Cup qualifying 2R 1L	France	5–2	Austria	Colombes, France
	Fontaine 6', 18', 70'; Vincent 38', 80'		Horak 40'; Pichler 65'	Stadium: Stade Olympique Yves-du-Manoir; Attendance: 43,775; Referee: Manuel Asensi Martín (Spain)

== See also ==
- Austria national football team results (1902–1929)
- Austria national football team results (1960–1979)
