= Austria at the FIFA World Cup =

International football delegation

This is a record of Austria's results at the FIFA World Cup. Austria has qualified on eight occasions, most recently in 2026. They also qualified for the tournament in 1938, but withdrew after the annexation of Austria by the Third Reich, with some of its team members joining the German team.

== Summary ==
=== 1930 World Cup in Uruguay ===
The first edition of the FIFA World Cup in Uruguay was the only one without qualifiers. However, the Austrian Football Association chose not to participate.

=== 1934 World Cup in Italy ===
After defeating France and Hungary on their way into the semi-finals, the strong Austrian squad lost 0–1 to hosts and eventual champions Italy. In the match for third place against Germany, Austria conceded a goal after 25 seconds by Ernst Lehner - the fastest goal in World Cup history until 1962.

=== 1938 World Cup in France ===
After qualifying by defeating Latvia in the qualifiers, Austria was drawn against Sweden in the first round. However, after the Anschluss in March 1938, the Austrian Football Association was incorporated into the German system. Nine Austrian players were called up for the Germany national squad instead. After being fielded in the opening match against Switzerland, Willibald Schmaus and goalkeeper Rudolf Raftl were the first players ever to represent two different nations at the FIFA World Cup. The match ended 1-1. In the decisive rematch, Austrian striker Wilhelm Hahnemann scored the opening goal, but the final score was 2-4 and Germany eliminated from the tournament.

=== 1950 World Cup in Brazil ===
Austria initially registered to participate and was supposed to play Turkey in the qualifications, but withdrew. At a later stage, Turkey also withdrew.

=== 1982 World Cup in Spain ===
Drawn in Group 2 alongside Algeria, Chile, and the Federal Republic of (West) Germany, Austria gained traction by defeating the South Americans 1–0 in the first group match. Austria later won 2–0 over the Algerians that saw them at a comfortable position in the group stage; however, Algeria, having already beaten West Germany in an upset, found themselves victorious against an already-eliminated Chile, and thus were all-but guaranteed to proceed to the next round alongside Germany, potentially leaving Austria out.

Austria played their decisive final group stage encounter against neighbors West Germany in Gijón, Spain, in one of the most controversial matches in World Cup history. Nicknamed "the Disgrace of Gijón, the match saw West Germany scoring once against Austria before both teams and players deliberately played underwhelmingly, wasting the clock and mathematically having both European teams of the group qualify at the expense of Africa's Algeria, the latter whom had defeated the Chileans a day prior to conclude their part of the group stage. Outrage from Algerian fans and Spanish spectators ensued, and both the German and Austrian media condemned the underhanded tactics of both teams' method of subversive "boring" football, with the German commentary team constantly apologizing to viewers for the sub-par action. Algerian football fans dubbed the match "the Anschluss", a reference to Austria being annexed by Germany under the Nazi regime. Austria saw themselves bowing out in a three-team group of the second stage, losing to France and drawing with Northern Ireland. Meanwhile, West Germany reached the final, losing 3–1 to European rivals Italy.

== Record at the FIFA World Cup ==
=== Overall record ===
FIFA World Cup record
Year	Round	Position	Pld	W	D*	L	GF	GA
(Uruguay) 1930	Did not enter							
(Italy) 1934	Fourth place	4th	4	2	0	2	7	7
(France) 1938	Withdrew							
(Brazil) 1950	Withdrew							
(Switzerland) 1954	Third place	3rd	5	4	0	1	17	12
(Sweden) 1958	Group stage	15th	3	0	1	2	2	7
(Chile) 1962	Withdrew							
(England) 1966	Did not qualify							
(Mexico) 1970	Did not qualify							
(West Germany) 1974	Did not qualify							
(Argentina) 1978	Quarter-finals (Note: Last 8 held as second group stage.)	7th	6	3	0	3	7	10
(Spain) 1982	Second round	8th	5	2	1	2	5	4
(Mexico) 1986	Did not qualify							
(Italy) 1990	Group stage	18th	3	1	0	2	2	3
(United States) 1994	Did not qualify							
(France) 1998	Group stage	23rd	3	0	2	1	3	4
(South Korea) (Japan) 2002	Did not qualify							
(Germany) 2006	Did not qualify							
(South Africa) 2010	Did not qualify							
(Brazil) 2014	Did not qualify							
(Russia) 2018	Did not qualify							
(Qatar) 2022	Did not qualify							
(Canada) (Mexico) (United States) 2026	Round of 32	28th	4	1	1	2	6	9
(Morocco) (Portugal) (Spain) 2030	To be determined							
(Saudi Arabia) 2034	To be determined							
Total	Third place	8/23	33	13	5	15	49	56

*Draws include knockout matches decided via penalty shoot-out.

Austria's World Cup record
First match	Austria 3–2 France (27 May 1934; Turin, Italy)
Biggest win	Austria 5–0 Czechoslovakia (19 June 1954; Zürich, Switzerland)
Biggest defeat	West Germany 6–1 Austria (30 June 1954; Basel, Switzerland)
Best result	Third place in 1954
Worst result	Group stage in 1958, 1990 and 1998

=== By match ===
World Cup	Round	Opponent	Score	Result	Venue	Austria scorers
1934	Round of 16	France	3–2 (a.e.t.)	W	Turin	M. Sindelar, A. Schall, J. Bican
1934	Quarter-finals	Hungary	2–1	W	Bologna	J. Horvath, K. Zischek
1934	Semi-finals	Italy	0–1	L	Milan	—
1934	Match for third place	Germany	2–3	L	Naples	J. Horvath, K. Sesta
1954	Group stage	Scotland	1–0	W	Zürich	E. Probst
1954	Group stage	Czechoslovakia	5–0	W	Zürich	E. Probst (3), E. Stojaspal (2)
1954	Quarter-finals	Switzerland	7–5	W	Lausanne	T. Wagner (3), A. Körner (2), E. Ocwirk, E. Probst
1954	Semi-finals	West Germany	1–6	L	Basel	E. Probst
1954	Match for third place	Uruguay	3–1	W	Zürich	E. Stojaspal, L. Cruz (o.g.), E. Ocwirk
1958	Group stage	Brazil	0–3	L	Uddevalla	—
1958	Group stage	Soviet Union	0–2	L	Borås	—
1958	Group stage	England	2–2	D	Borås	K. Koller, A. Körner
1978	Group stage	Spain	2–1	W	Buenos Aires	W. Schachner, H. Krankl
1978	Group stage	Sweden	1–0	W	Buenos Aires	H. Krankl
1978	Group stage	Brazil	0–1	L	Mar del Plata	—
1978	Second round	Netherlands	1–5	L	Córdoba	E. Obermayer
1978	Second round	Italy	0–1	L	Buenos Aires	—
1978	Second round	West Germany	3–2	W	Córdoba	H. Krankl (2), B. Vogts (o.g.)
1982	Group stage	Chile	1–0	W	Oviedo	W. Schachner
1982	Group stage	Algeria	2–0	W	Oviedo	W. Schachner, H. Krankl
1982	Group stage	West Germany	0–1	L	Gijón	—
1982	Second round	France	0–1	L	Madrid	—
1982	Second round	Northern Ireland	2–2	D	Madrid	B. Pezzey, R. Hintermaier
1990	Group stage	Italy	0–1	L	Rome	—
1990	Group stage	Czechoslovakia	0–1	L	Florence	—
1990	Group stage	United States	2–1	W	Florence	A. Ogris, G. Rodax
1998	Group stage	Cameroon	1–1	D	Toulouse	A. Polster
1998	Group stage	Chile	1–1	D	Saint-Étienne	I. Vastić
1998	Group stage	Italy	1–2	L	Saint-Denis	A. Herzog
2026	Group stage	Jordan	3–1	W	Santa Clara	R. Schmid, Y. Al-Arab (o.g.), M. Arnautović
2026	Group stage	Argentina	0–2	L	Arlington	—
2026	Group stage	Algeria	3–3	D	Kansas City	M. Arnautović, M. Sabitzer, S. Kalajdžić
2026	Round of 32	Spain	0–3	L	Inglewood	—

=== Record by opponent ===
FIFA World Cup matches (by team)
Opponent	Wins	Draws	Losses	Total	Goals Scored	Goals Conceded
Algeria	1	1	0	2	5	3
Argentina	0	0	1	1	0	2
Brazil	0	0	2	2	0	4
Cameroon	0	1	0	1	1	1
Chile	1	1	0	2	2	1
Czechoslovakia	1	0	1	2	5	1
England	0	1	0	1	2	2
France	1	0	1	2	3	3
Germany	0	0	1	1	2	3
Hungary	1	0	0	1	2	1
Italy	0	0	4	4	1	5
Jordan	1	0	0	1	3	1
Netherlands	0	0	1	1	1	5
Northern Ireland	0	1	0	1	2	2
Scotland	1	0	0	1	1	0
Soviet Union	0	0	1	1	0	2
Spain	1	0	1	2	2	4
Sweden	1	0	0	1	1	0
Switzerland	1	0	0	1	7	5
United States	1	0	0	1	2	1
Uruguay	1	0	0	1	3	1
West Germany	1	0	2	3	4	9

== Most appearances ==
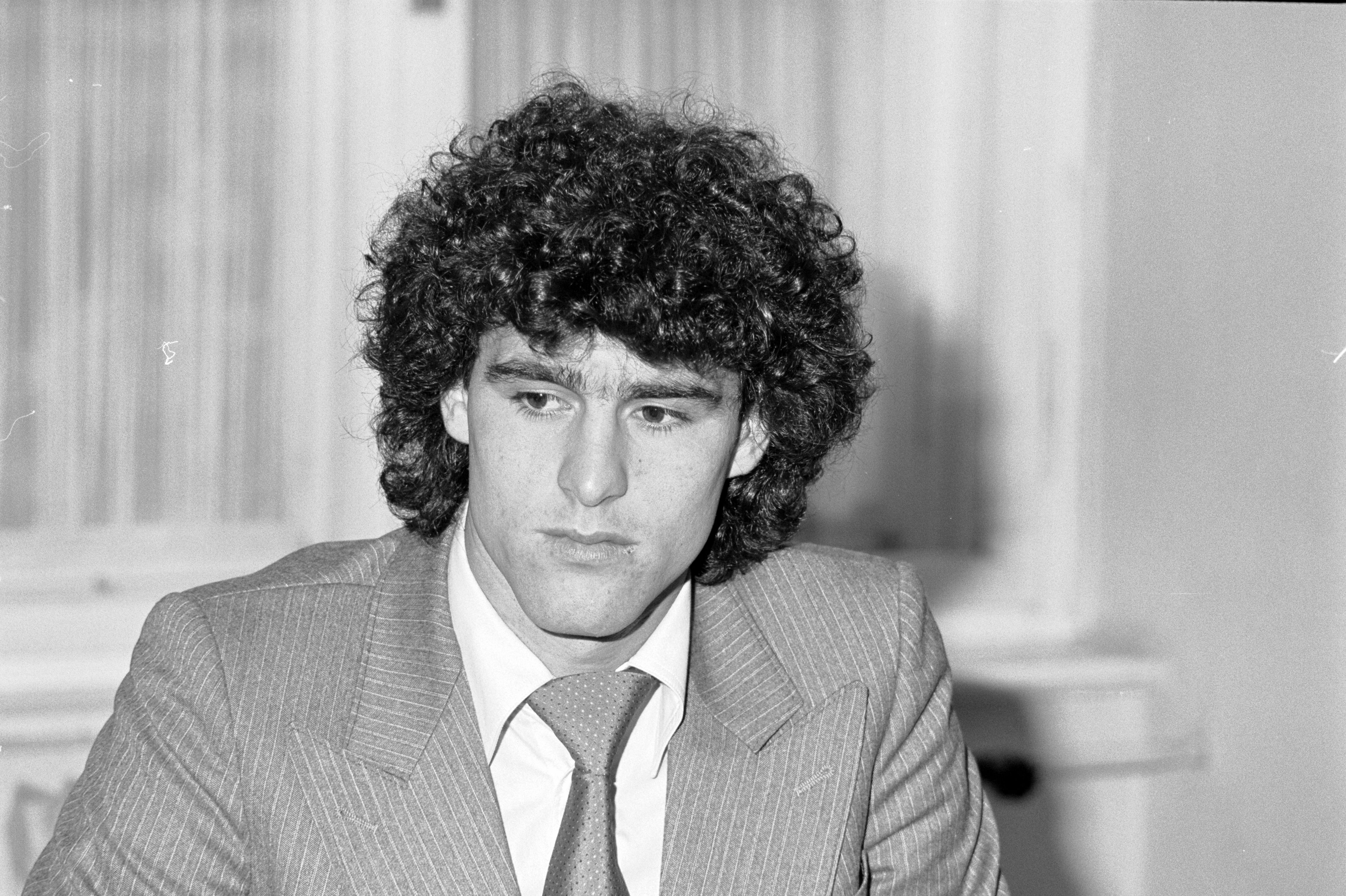
Defender Bruno Pezzey is Austria's joint-record player at FIFA World Cups. He played all eleven matches at the 1978 and 1982 tournaments, reaching the second group stage both times.

Rank	Player	Matches	World Cups
1	Friedrich Koncilia	11	1978 and 1982
1	Erich Obermayer	11	1978 and 1982
1	Bruno Pezzey	11	1978 and 1982
1	Herbert Prohaska	11	1978 and 1982
5	Hans Krankl	10	1978 and 1982
6	Gerhard Hanappi	8	1954 and 1958
6	Karl Koller	8	1954 and 1958
6	Walter Schachner	8	1978 and 1982
9	Alfred Körner	7	1954 and 1958

== Goalscorers ==
On 27 May 1934, Matthias Sindelar made history by scoring Austria's first-ever FIFA World Cup goal, coming in their opening match against France in Turin.

Player	Goals	1934	1954	1958	1978	1982	1990	1998	2026
Erich Probst	6		6						
Hans Krankl	5				4	1			
Ernst Stojaspal	3		3						
Theodor Wagner	3		3						
Alfred Körner	3		2	1					
Walter Schachner	3				1	2			
Johann Horvath	2	2							
Ernst Ocwirk	2		2						
Marko Arnautović	2								2
Matthias Sindelar	1	1							
Anton Schall	1	1							
Josef Bican	1	1							
Karl Zischek	1	1							
Karl Sesta	1	1							
Karl Koller	1			1					
Erich Obermayer	1				1				
Bruno Pezzey	1					1			
Reinhold Hintermaier	1					1			
Andreas Ogris	1						1		
Gerhard Rodax	1						1		
Toni Polster	1							1	
Ivica Vastić	1							1	
Andi Herzog	1							1	
Romano Schmid	1								1
Marcel Sabitzer	1								1
Saša Kalajdžić	1								1
Own goals	1								1
Total	47	7	16	2	6	5	2	3	6

== Historical performances ==
=== Team awards ===
- Third Place - 1954

=== Individual awards ===
- Silver Ball 1934: Matthias Sindelar
- Silver Boot 1954: Erich Probst

Ernst Happel has won 2nd Place as a coach with the Netherlands in 1978 after losing the final 3-1 a.e.t. to Argentina

== See also ==
- Austria at the UEFA European Championship
