= List of Austria national football team hat-tricks =

This page is a list of the hat-tricks scored for the Austria national football team. Since Austria's first international association football match on 12 October 1902 against Hungary, there have been 42 recorded hat-tricks, the first of which was scored by Jan Studnicka in this first game. The most goals scored in a single match is six, achieved by Hans Krankl against Malta in 1974 FIFA World Cup qualification.

The record for most hat-tricks scored by an Austrian player is four, held jointly by two different players: Anton Schall and Johann Horvath. The most hat-tricks scored in a single game is two, with Anton Schall and Matthias Sindelar both scoring hat-tricks against Hungary in a 1932 friendly. Two Austrians have scored hat-tricks at the FIFA World Cup: Erich Probst against Czechoslovakia and Theodor Wagner against Switzerland, with both coming at the 1954 edition.

Austria have conceded 29 hat-tricks in total, 11 of which have come against Hungary. Three players, namely Vivian Woodward, Alfréd Schaffer and Ferenc Puskás have scored two hat-tricks each against Austria, with Woodward jointly holding the record of most-goals scored in a single game against Austria, 4, with Raúl. The most notable hat-trick scored against Austria was scored by Josef Hügi at the 1954 FIFA World Cup, a game which Austria won 7–5.

== Hat-tricks scored by Austria ==
Scores and results list Austria's goal tally first.

No.	Player	Date	Opponent	Venue	Goals	Result	Competition	Ref.
1	Jan Studnicka	12 October 1902	Hungary	WAC-Platz, Vienna, Austria	3	5–0	Friendly	
2	Jan Studnicka (2)	11 October 1903	Hungary	WAC-Platz, Vienna, Austria	3 – (24', 57', 72')	4–2	Friendly	
3	Charles Stanfield	9 October 1904	Hungary	Cricketer-Platz, Vienna, Austria	4 – (23', 53', 83', 84')	5–4	Friendly	
4	Ferdinand Swatosch	26 September 1920	Germany	Simmeringer Had, Vienna, Austria	3 – (64', 83', 86')	3–2	Friendly	
5	Josef Uridil	11 June 1922	Switzerland	Hohe Warte Stadium, Vienna, Austria	3 – (17', 27', 29')	7–1	Friendly	
6	Gustav Wieser	10 February 1924	Yugoslavia	Stadion Kranjčevićeva, Zagreb, Croatia	3 – (7', 69', 82')	4–1	Friendly	
7	Karl Kanhäuser	20 May 1924	Romania	Vienna, Austria	3 – (9', 52', 85')	4–1	Friendly	
8	Johann Horvath	21 May 1924	Bulgaria	Hohe Warte Stadium, Vienna, Austria	3	6–0	Friendly	
9	Johann Horvath (2)	5 July 1925	Sweden	Råsunda IP, Solna, Sweden	3 – (11', 22', 60')	4–2	Friendly	
10	Johann Horvath (3)	10 October 1926	Switzerland	Hohe Warte Stadium, Vienna, Austria	3	7–1	Friendly	
11	Franz Weselik	6 May 1928	Hungary	Hungária körúti stadion, Budapest, Hungary	3 – (23', 37', 52')	5–5	Friendly	
12	Anton Schall	24 May 1931	Germany	Deutsches Stadion, Berlin, Germany	3	6–0	Friendly	
13	Matthias Sindelar	13 September 1931	Germany	Praterstadion, Vienna, Austria	3	5–0	Friendly	
14	Anton Schall (2)	29 November 1931	Switzerland	Landhof, Basel, Switzerland	3	8–1	Friendly	
15	Anton Schall (3)	24 April 1932	Hungary	Hohe Warte Stadium, Vienna, Austria	4	8–2	Friendly	
16	Matthias Sindelar (2)	24 April 1932	Hungary	Hohe Warte Stadium, Vienna, Austria	3	8–2	Friendly	
17	Anton Schall (4)	11 December 1932	Belgium	Jubilee Stadium, Brussels, Belgium	4 – (17', 27', 43', 76')	6–1	Friendly	
18	Karl Zischek	11 February 1934	Italy	Stadio Municipale Benito Mussolini, Turin, Italy	3 – (20', 23', 55')	4–2	1933–1935 Central European International Cup	
19	Johann Horvath (4)	25 April 1934	Bulgaria	Praterstadion, Vienna, Austria	3 – (19', 22', 33')	6–1	1934 FIFA World Cup qualification	
20	Josef Bican	6 October 1935	Hungary	Praterstadion, Vienna, Austria	3	4–4	1933–1935 Central European International Cup	
21	Karl Decker	6 December 1945	France	Praterstadion, Vienna, Austria	3 – (14', 16', 78')	4–1	Friendly	
22	Karl Decker (2)	13 November 1949	Yugoslavia	JNA Stadium, Belgrade, Serbia	3 – (29', 70', 73')	5–2	Friendly	
23	Theodor Wagner	5 November 1950	Denmark	Praterstadion, Vienna, Austria	3 – (19', 21', 44')	5–1	Friendly	
24	Adolf Huber	7 May 1952	Republic of Ireland	Praterstadion, Vienna, Austria	3 – (22', 23', 25')	6–0	Friendly	
25	Erich Probst	27 September 1953	Portugal	Praterstadion, Vienna, Austria	5 – (14', 19', 31', 59', 70')	9–1	1954 FIFA World Cup qualification	
26	Erich Probst (2)	19 June 1954	Czechoslovakia	Hardturm, Zurich, Switzerland	3 – (4', 21', 24')	5–0	1954 FIFA World Cup	
27	Theodor Wagner (2)	26 June 1954	Switzerland	Stade Olympique de la Pontaise, Lausanne, Switzerland	3 – (25', 27', 53')	7–5	1954 FIFA World Cup	
28	Horst Nemec	24 April 1963	Czechoslovakia	Praterstadion, Vienna, Austria	3 – (49', 70', 77')	3–1	Friendly	
29	Erich Hof	19 May 1968	Cyprus	Praterstadion, Vienna, Austria	5 – (4' pen., 42', 53', 68', 75' pen.)	7–1	1970 FIFA World Cup qualification	
30	Thomas Parits	10 October 1971	Republic of Ireland	Linzer Stadion, Linz, Austria	3 – (45', 51', 89')	6–0	UEFA Euro 1972 qualifying	
31	Josef Hickersberger	30 April 1972	Malta	Praterstadion, Vienna, Austria	3 – (29', 34', 36')	4–0	1974 FIFA World Cup qualification	
32	Hans Krankl	30 April 1977	Malta	Stadion Lehen, Salzburg, Austria	6 – (8', 12', 16', 18', 54', 66')	9–0	1978 FIFA World Cup qualification	
33	Rupert Marko	17 May 1988	Hungary	Népstadion, Budapest, Hungary	3 – (19', 80', 88')	4–0	Friendly	
34	Toni Polster	15 November 1989	East Germany	Praterstadion, Vienna, Austria	3 – (2', 23' pen., 61')	3–0	1990 FIFA World Cup qualification	
35	Peter Stöger	17 May 1994	Poland	GKS Katowice Stadium, Katowice, Poland	3 – (5', 26', 64')	4–3	Friendly	
36	Toni Polster (2)	7 September 1994	Liechtenstein	Sportpark Eschen-Mauren, Eschen, Liechtenstein	3 – (18', 45', 79')	4–0	UEFA Euro 1996 qualifying	
37	Peter Stöger (2)	6 September 1995	Republic of Ireland	Ernst-Happel-Stadion, Vienna, Austria	3 – (3', 64', 77')	3–1	UEFA Euro 1996 qualifying	
38	Toni Polster (3)	20 August 1997	Estonia	Kadriorg Stadium, Tallinn, Estonia	3 – (47', 70', 90')	3–0	1998 FIFA World Cup qualification	
39	Ivica Vastić	28 April 1999	San Marino	Liebenauer Stadium, Graz, Austria	3 – (42', 44', 84')	7–0	UEFA Euro 2000 qualifying	
40	René Aufhauser	15 November 2006	Trinidad and Tobago	Ernst-Happel-Stadion. Vienna, Austria	3 – (14', 25', 44')	4–1	Friendly	
41	Michael Gregoritsch	26 March 2024	Turkey	Ernst-Happel-Stadion. Vienna, Austria	3 – (44', 48', 59' pen.)	6–1	Friendly	
42	Marko Arnautović	9 October 2025	San Marino	Ernst-Happel-Stadion. Vienna, Austria	4 – (8', 47', 83', 84')	10–0	2026 FIFA World Cup qualification	

== Hat-tricks conceded by Austria ==
Scores and results list Austria's goal tally first.

No.	Player	Date	Opponent	Venue	Goals	Result	Competition	Ref.
1	Vivian Woodward	8 June 1908	England	Hohe Warte Stadium, Vienna, Austria	4 – (4', 41', 55', 84')	1–11	Friendly	
2	Frank Bradshaw	8 June 1908	England	Hohe Warte Stadium, Vienna, Austria	3 – (19', 72', 85')	1–11	Friendly	
3	Imre Schlosser	2 May 1999	Hungary	Cricketer-Platz, Vienna, Austria	3 – (35', 54' pen., 73' pen.)	3–4	Friendly	
4	Vivian Woodward (2)	1 June 1909	England	Hohe Warte Stadium, Vienna, Austria	3	1–8	Friendly	
5	Alfréd Schaffer	7 November 1915	Hungary	Üllői úti stadion, Budapest, Hungary	3 – (21', 75', 90')	2–6	Friendly	
6	Alfréd Schaffer (2)	15 July 1917	Hungary	WAC-Platz, Vienna, Austria	3 – (39', 73', 77')	1–4	Friendly	
7	Andreas Franz	13 January 1924	Germany	Nuremberg, Germany	3 – (35', 42' pen., 72')	3–4	Friendly	
8	Vilmos Kohut	6 May 1928	Hungary	Hungária körúti stadion, Budapest, Hungary	3 – (2', 27', 43')	5–5	Friendly	
9	György Sárosi	12 May 1935	Hungary	Üllői úti stadion, Budapest, Hungary	3	3–6	Friendly	
10	Lipót Kállai	5 April 1936	Hungary	Hohe Warte Stadium, Vienna, Austria	3	3–5	Friendly	
11	Géza Toldi	27 September 1936	Hungary	Budapest, Hungary	3	3–5	1936–1938 Central European International Cup	
12	Ferenc Szusza	14 September 1947	Hungary	Praterstadion, Vienna, Austria	3	4–3	Friendly	
13	Ferenc Puskás	8 May 1949	Hungary	Megyeri úti Stadion, Budapest, Hungary	3	1–6	1948–1953 Central European International Cup	
14	Ferenc Puskás (2)	29 October 1950	Hungary	Megyeri úti Stadion, Budapest, Hungary	3	3–4	Friendly	
15	Stjepan Bobek	21 September 1952	Yugoslavia	JNA Stadium, Belgrade, Serbia	3 – (14', 50', 87' pen.)	2–4	Friendly	
16	Josef Hügi	26 June 1954	Switzerland	Stade Olympique de la Pontaise, Lausanne, Switzerland	3 – (17', 19', 58')	7–5	1954 FIFA World Cup	
17	Todor Veselinović	14 September 1958	Yugoslavia	Praterstadion, Vienna, Austria	3 – (31', 68', 70')	3–4	Friendly	
18	Just Fontaine	13 December 1959	France	Stade Yves-du-Manoir, Colombes, France	3 – (7', 18', 70')	2–5	UEFA Euro 1960 qualifying	
19	Lothar Ulsaß	9 October 1965	West Germany	Neckarstadion, Stuttgart, Germany	3	1–4	Friendly	
20	János Farkas	30 October 1966	Hungary	Népstadion, Budapest, Hungary	3	1–3	Friendly	
21	Giorgos Sideris	5 October 1967	Greece	Neo Phaliron Velodrome, Piraeus, Greece	3 – (27', 34' pen., 63')	1–4	UEFA Euro 1968 qualifying	
22	Diego Maradona	21 May 1980	Argentina	Praterstadion, Vienna, Austria	3 – (15', 75', 88')	1–5	Friendly	
23	Darko Pančev	31 October 1990	Yugoslavia	Red Star Stadium, Belgrade, Serbia	3 – (32', 52', 85')	1–4	UEFA Euro 1992 qualifying	
24	Kennet Andersson	1 May 1991	Sweden	Råsunda Stadium, Solna, Sweden	3 – (12', 34', 88')	0–6	Friendly	
25	Raúl González	27 March 1999	Spain	Mestalla Stadium, Valencia, Spain	4 – (6', 17', 47', 75')	0–9	UEFA Euro 2000 qualifying	
26	Miroslav Klose	18 May 2002	Germany	BayArena, Leverkusen, Germany	3 – {15', 29', 53')	2–6	Friendly	
27	Kevin Kurányi	18 August 2008	Germany	Ernst-Happel-Stadion. Vienna, Austria	3 – (2', 61', 73')	1–3	Friendly	
28	Tuncay Şanlı	19 November 2008	Turkey	Ernst-Happel-Stadion. Vienna, Austria	3 – (40', 47', 62')	2–4	Friendly	
29	Eran Zahavi	24 March 2019	Israel	Sammy Ofer Stadium, Haifa, Israel	3 – (34', 45', 55')	2–4	UEFA Euro 2020 qualifying	
