= 1931–32 Central European International Cup =

Tournament details
- Dates: 22 February 1931 – 28 October 1932
- Teams: 5

Final positions
- Champions: Austria (1st title)
- Runners-up: Italy
- Third place: Hungary
- Fourth place: Czechoslovakia

Tournament statistics
- Matches played: 20
- Goals scored: 84 (4.2 per match)
- Attendance: 667,700 (33,385 per match)
- Top goal scorer(s): (Hungary) István Avar (Switzerland) André Abegglen (8 goals)

The 1931–32 Central European International Cup was the second edition of the Central European International Cup played between 1931 and 1932. It was played in a round robin tournament between five teams involved in the tournament.

== Final standings and results ==
Pos	Team	Pld	W	D	L	GF	GA	GD	Pts	(Austria)	(Italy)	(Hungary)	(Czechoslovakia)	(Switzerland)
1	Austria	8	4	3	1	19	9	+10	11	—	2–1	0–0	2–1	3–1
2	Italy	8	3	3	2	14	11	+3	9	2–1	—	3–2	2–2	3–0
3	Hungary	8	2	4	2	17	15	+2	8	2–2	1–1	—	2–1	6–2
4	Czechoslovakia	8	2	3	3	18	19	−1	7	1–1	2–1	3–3	—	7–3
5	Switzerland	8	2	1	5	16	30	−14	5	1–8	1–1	3–1	5–1	—

Source: EU-Football

== Matches ==
22 February 1931
15:00 UTC+1

Italy	2–1	Austria
Meazza 34'; Orsi 52'	Report	Horvath 4'

San Siro, Milan, Kingdom of Italy
Attendance: 45,000
Referee: Paul Ruoff (Switzerland)

22 March 1931
16:00 UTC+1

Czechoslovakia	3–3	Hungary
Svoboda 35', 66'; Junek 45'	Report	Avar 11', 33', 53'

Stadion Letná, Prague, Czechoslovakia
Attendance: 26,700
Referee: Peco Bauwens (Germany)

29 March 1931
15:00 UTC+1

Switzerland	1–1	Italy
A. Abegglen 70' (pen.)	Report	Cesarini 85'

Wankdorf Stadium, Bern, Switzerland
Attendance: 22,000
Referee: Stanley Rous (England)

12 April 1931
16:00 UTC+1

Austria	2–1	Czechoslovakia
Nausch 37'; Horvath 42'	Report	Silný 38'

Hohe Warte Stadium, Vienna, Austria
Attendance: 42,000
Referee: Paul Ruoff (Switzerland)

12 April 1931
16:30 UTC+1

Hungary	6–2	Switzerland
Avar 3', 71', 87'; Szábo 35' (pen.); Kalmár 75'; Tänzer 76'	Report	A. Abegglen 4', 8'

Hungária körúti stadion, Budapest, Hungary
Attendance: 25,000
Referee: Rinaldo Barlassina (Italy)

3 May 1931
17:00 UTC+1

Austria	0–0	Hungary
	Report

Hohe Warte Stadium, Vienna, Austria
Attendance: 43,000
Referee: René Mercet (Switzerland)

13 June 1931
18:00 UTC+1

Czechoslovakia	7–3	Switzerland
Bejbl 12', 53', 82'; Silný 48', 58'; Bradáč 64', 80'	Report	Fasson 5'; Büche 33' (pen.); Springer 35'

Stadion Letná, Prague, Czechoslovakia
Attendance: 15,000
Referee: Albino Carraro (Italy)

4 October 1931
15:00 UTC+1

Hungary	2–2	Austria
Szábo 42' (pen.); Spitz 65'	Report	Zischek 56', 86'

Hungária körúti stadion, Budapest, Hungary
Attendance: 32,000
Referee: Peco Bauwens (Germany)

15 November 1931
15:00 UTC+1

Italy	2–2	Czechoslovakia
Pitto 53'; Bernardini 57' (pen.)	Report	Svoboda 55', 83'

Stadio Nazionale PNF, Rome, Kingdom of Italy
Attendance: 35,000
Referee: Paul Ruoff (Switzerland)

29 November 1931
14:30 UTC+1

Switzerland	1–8	Austria
A. Abegglen 32'	Report	Gschweidl 10', 63'; Zischek 33'; Schall 49', 80', 86'; Vogl 58'; Sindelar 61'

Stadion Rankhof, Basel, Switzerland
Attendance: 25,000
Referee: František Cejnar (Czechoslovakia)

13 December 1931
14:30 UTC+1

Italy	3–2	Hungary
Libonatti 22'; Orsi 56'; Cesarini 90'	Report	Avar 53', 60'

Stadio Filadelfia, Turin, Kingdom of Italy
Attendance: 40,000
Referee: René Mercet (Switzerland)

14 February 1932
15:00 UTC+1

Italy	3–0	Switzerland
Fedullo 30', 32', 55'	Report

Stadio Partenopeo, Naples, Kingdom of Italy
Attendance: 30,000
Referee: Peco Bauwens (Germany)

20 March 1932
16:00 UTC+1

Austria	2–1	Italy
Sindelar 56', 58'	Report	Meazza 66'

Praterstadion, Vienna, Austria
Attendance: 63,000
Referee: Paul Ruoff (Switzerland)

17 April 1932
15:00 UTC+1

Switzerland	5–1	Czechoslovakia
A. Abegglen 17', 41'; M. Abegglen 28', 48'; Billeter 80'	Report	Bradáč 63'

Hardturm, Zürich, Switzerland
Attendance: 21,000
Referee: Louis Raguin (France)

8 May 1932
17:00 UTC+1

Hungary	1–1	Italy
Toldi 44' (pen.)	Report	Constantino 4'

Hungária körúti stadion, Budapest, Hungary
Attendance: 40,000
Referee: Sophus Hansen (Denmark)

22 May 1932
17:00 UTC+1

Czechoslovakia	1–1	Austria
Svoboda 36'	Report	Sindelar 2'

Stadion Letná, Prague, Czechoslovakia
Attendance: 30,000
Referee: Moritz Fuchs (Germany)

19 June 1932
16:00 UTC+1

Switzerland	3–1	Hungary
von Känel 47'; Passello 64'; A. Abegglen 81'	Report	Weiler 79' (o.g.)

Wankdorf Stadium, Bern, Switzerland
Attendance: 22,000
Referee: Stanley Rous (England)

18 September 1932
16:00 UTC+1

Hungary	2–1	Czechoslovakia
Toldi 78'; Titkos 81'	Report	Puč 73'

Üllői úti stadion, Budapest, Hungary
Attendance: 25,000
Referee: Otto Ohlsson (Sweden)

23 October 1932
14:45 UTC+1

Austria	3–1	Switzerland
Müller 14'; Schall 54', 67'	Report	A. Abegglen 68'

Praterstadion, Vienna, Austria
Attendance: 55,000
Referee: František Cejnar (Czechoslovakia)

28 October 1932
15:00 UTC+1

Czechoslovakia	2–1	Italy
Bradáč 28' (pen.); Nejedlý 59'	Report	Ferrari 54'

Sportovní Stadion, Prague, Czechoslovakia
Attendance: 31,000
Referee: Peco Bauwens (Germany)

== Winner ==
1931–32 Central European International Cup

Austria
First title

== Statistics ==
=== Goalscorers ===
There were 84 goals scored in 20 matches, for an average of 4.2 goals per match.

8 goals

- (Hungary) István Avar
- (Switzerland) André Abegglen

5 goals

- (Austria) Anton Schall
- (Czechoslovakia) František Svoboda

4 goals

- (Austria) Matthias Sindelar
- (Czechoslovakia) Vojtěch Bradáč

3 goals

- (Austria) Karl Zischek
- (Italy) Francisco Fedullo
- (Czechoslovakia) Josef Silný
- (Czechoslovakia) Karel Bejbl

2 goals

- (Austria) Johann Horvath
- (Austria) Fritz Gschweidl
- (Hungary) Géza Toldi
- (Hungary) Gábor P. Szabó
- (Italy) Renato Cesarini
- (Italy) Giuseppe Meazza
- (Italy) Raimundo Orsi
- (Switzerland) Max Abegglen

1 goal

- (Austria) Adolf Vogl
- (Austria) Walter Nausch
- (Austria) Heinrich Müller
- (Hungary) Mihai Tänzer
- (Hungary) Illés Spitz
- (Hungary) Pál Titkos
- (Hungary) Jenő Kalmár
- (Italy) Alfredo Pitto
- (Italy) Fulvio Bernardini
- (Italy) Raffaele Costantino
- (Italy) Giovanni Ferrari
- (Italy) Julio Libonatti
- (Switzerland) Albert Büche
- (Switzerland) Raymond Passello
- (Switzerland) Léo-Paul Billeter
- (Switzerland) Hermann Springer
- (Switzerland) Mario Fasson
- (Switzerland) Willy Von Kanel
- (Czechoslovakia) Antonín Puč
- (Czechoslovakia) Oldřich Nejedlý
- (Czechoslovakia) František Junek

1 own goal

- (Switzerland) Max Weiler (against Hungary)
