= 1958 FIFA World Cup qualification – UEFA Group 5 =

Football tournament

The three teams in this group played against each other on a home-and-away basis. The group winner Austria qualified for the sixth FIFA World Cup held in Sweden.

== Table ==
Pos	Team	Pld	W	D	L	GF	GA	GR	Pts	Qualification	Austria national football team	Netherlands national football team	Luxembourg national football team
1	Austria	4	3	1	0	14	3	4.667	7	Qualification to 1958 FIFA World Cup	—	3–2	7–0
2	Netherlands	4	2	1	1	12	7	1.714	5		1–1	—	4–1
3	Luxembourg	4	0	0	4	3	19	0.158	0		0–3	2–5	—

Source: FIFA

== Matches ==
30 September 1956

Austria	7 – 0	Luxembourg
Hanappi 18', 25'; Walzhofer 51'; Wagner 62', 77'; Kozlicek 71'; Haummer 79'	Report

Attendance: 30,000
Referee: Francesco Liverani (Italy)

20 March 1957

Netherlands	4 – 1	Luxembourg
Van der Gijp 27', 30'; Dillen 72'; Brusselers 80'	Report	Halsdorf 34'

Attendance: 58,000
Referee: Treichel (West Germany)

26 May 1957

Austria	3 – 2	Netherlands
Koller 47'; Buzek 80'; Stotz 89' (pen.)	Report	Van Melis 30', 32'

Attendance: 54,027
Referee: Schmetzer (West Germany)

11 September 1957

Luxembourg	2 – 5	Netherlands
Fiedler 5'; Letsch 58'	Report	Lenstra 15', 28'; Wilkes 26'; Van Melis 35'; Rijvers 54'

Attendance: 55,000
Referee: Murdoch (England)

25 September 1957

Netherlands	1 – 1	Austria
Lenstra 63'	Report	Hanappi 29'

Attendance: 63,800
Referee: Ellis (England)

29 September 1957

Luxembourg	0 – 3	Austria
	Report	Dienst 19'; Buzek 47'; Senekowitsch 66'

Attendance: 2,000
Referee: Versyp (Belgium)
