= 1934 Mitropa Cup =

Tournament details
- Dates: 12 June – 9 September 1934
- Teams: 16

Final positions
- Champions: (Italy) AGC Bologna (2nd title)
- Runners-up: (Austria) Admira Wien

Tournament statistics
- Matches played: 32
- Top scorer(s): (Italy) Carlo Reguzzoni (10 goals)

The 1934 season of the Mitropa Cup football club tournament was won by AGC Bologna who defeated Admira Wien 7–4 on aggregate in the final. It was Bologna's second victory in the competition, having won it previously in 1932. The two legs of the final were played on 5 September and 9 September.

This was the eighth edition of the tournament. Holders FK Austria Wien were eliminated in the first round

== First round ==
Team 1	Agg.	Team 2	1st leg	2nd leg
Ferencváros (Hungary)	10–1	(Austria) Floridsdorfer AC	8–0	2–1
Kladno (Czechoslovakia)	4–3	(Italy) Ambrosiana Inter	1–1	3–2
AGC Bologna (Italy)	3–2	(Hungary) Bocskai	2–0	1–2
Slavia Prague (Czechoslovakia)	2–4	(Austria) Rapid Wien	1–3	1–1
Austria Wien	2–4	(Hungary) Újpest	1–2	1–2
Juventus (Italy)	5–2	(Czechoslovakia) Teplicky	4–2	1–0
Admira Wien (Austria)	2–2^{a}	(Italy) Napoli	0–0	2–2
Hungária MTK (Hungary)	3–3^{a}*	(Czechoslovakia) Sparta Prague	2–1	1–2

=== Play-offs ===
Team 1	Score	Team 2
Admira Wien (Austria)	5–0	(Italy) Napoli
Hungária MTK (Hungary)	1–1^{b}	(Czechoslovakia) Sparta Prague

- ^{a} Match decided by play off.
- ^{b} Match decided by coin toss.
- ^{*} The original play off between Budapest and Sparta; (Sparta 5 Hungária MTK 2), was declared void, as well as the original home and away matches (Hungária MTK 4 Sparta 5; Sparta 1 Hungária MTK 2), due to Sparta having fielded an ineligible player. The tie was subsequently played from the beginning.

== Quarterfinals ==
Team 1	Agg.	Team 2	1st leg	2nd leg
Ferencváros (Hungary)	7–4	(Czechoslovakia) Kladno	6–0	1–4
Újpest (Hungary)	2–4	(Italy) Juventus	1–3	1–1
AGC Bologna (Italy)	7–5	(Austria) Rapid Wien	6–1	1–4
Admira Wien (Austria)	6–3	(Czechoslovakia) Sparta Prague	4–0	2–3

== Semifinals ==
Team 1	Agg.	Team 2	1st leg	2nd leg
Ferencváros (Hungary)	2–6	(Italy) AGC Bologna	1–1	1–5
Admira Wien (Austria)	4–3	(Italy) Juventus	3–1	1–2

== Finals ==
Team 1	Agg.	Team 2	1st leg	2nd leg
Admira Wien (Austria)	4–7	(Italy) AGC Bologna	3–2	1–5

5 September 1934

Admira Wien (Austria)	3–2	(Italy) AGC Bologna
Stoiber 56'; Vogl 58'; Schall 60'		Spivach 7'; Reguzzoni 25'

Praterstadion, Vienna
Attendance: 35,000
Referee: William Walden (England)

9 September 1934

AGC Bologna (Italy)	5–1	(Austria) Admira Wien
Maini 21'; Reguzzoni 33', 40', 88'; Fedullo 44'		Vogl 32'

Littoriale, Bologna
Attendance: 58,000
Referee: Jimmy Jewell (England)

1934 Mitropa Cup Champions

Bologna
2nd Title

== Top goalscorers ==
Rank	Player	Team	Goals
1	(Italy) Carlo Reguzzoni	(Italy) AGC Bologna	10
2	(Hungary) György Sárosi	(Hungary) Ferencváros	7
2	(Austria) Adolf Vogl	(Austria) Admira Wien	7
4	(Austria) Franz Binder	(Austria) Rapid Wien	6
