= Heinrich Müller (footballer, born 1909) =

Austrian footballer and coach (1909–2000)

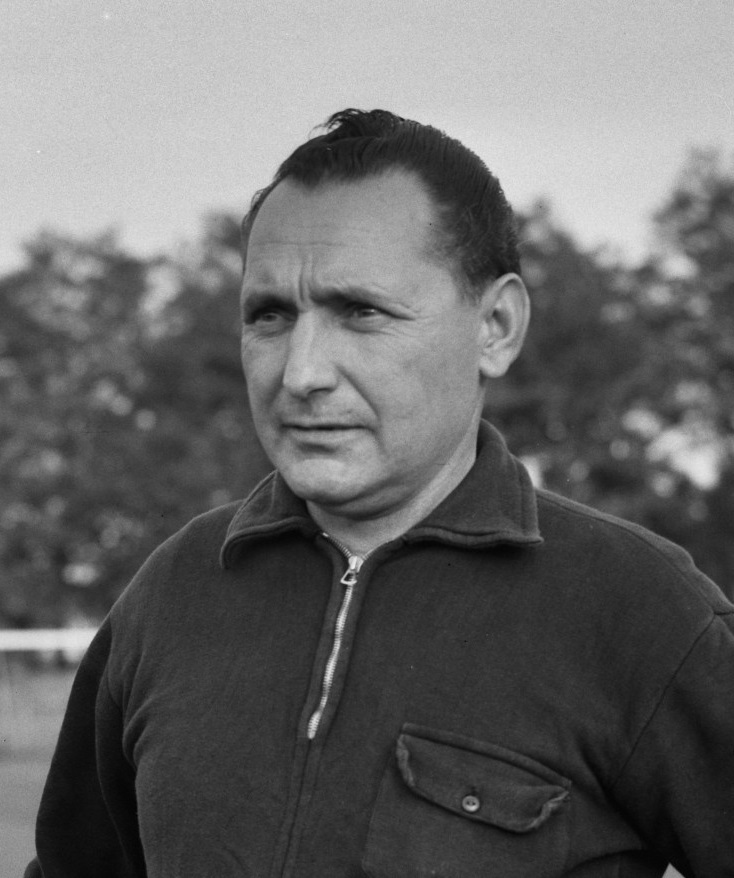
- Müller in 1956

Personal information
- Date of birth: 13 May 1909
- Place of birth: Austria-Hungary
- Date of death: 5 April 2000 (aged 90)
- Position: Midfielder

Senior career*
Years	Team	Apps	(Gls)
- Wiener AC
- MTK Hungaria
1940–1947	Austria Wien		

International career
1932–1933	Austria	5	(4)

Managerial career
- 1946–1954: Austria Wien
- 1956: Netherlands
- 1956–1962: Willem II
- 1963–1964: AEK Athens
- 1964–1965: Austria Wien
- 1971–1972: Austria Wien
- * Club domestic league appearances and goals

Heinrich "Wudi" Müller (13 May 1909 – 5 April 2000) was an Austrian football player and coach. In the early 1930s he was part of the Austria national team. As coach he defined the post-World War II period of Austria Wien.

== Playing career ==
=== Club career ===
The trained shoemaker played from 1921 to 1935 for Wiener AC in Vienna, Austria. With this club he won the 1931 Cup of Austria and made it all the way to the final of the Mitropa Cup, both matches of which were lost against local rivals First Vienna FC.

In 1935 the offensive midfielder moved to MTK Hungaria in Budapest where he won, alongside players like Gusztáv Sebes and Ferenc Sas the Hungarian championships of 1936 and 1937. In June 1940 Müller returned to Vienna and joined Austria Wien, initially as a player.

=== International career ===
In the early 1930's he was called five times to play for the Austria national team, for which he scored four goals.

This includes two nominations for the Wunderteam, where he played under the management team Hugo Meisl and Jimmy Hogan alongside Matthias Sindelar. In these matches, Austria defeated Italy 2–1 in March 1932 and Hungary 3–2 in October 1932

== Managerial career ==
As coach his name is primarily associated with FK Austria. Over three terms, which span the 1940s, 50s, 60s and 70s, he altogether was in charge there for about 12 years. To date he remains the longest serving coach of Austria.

Most successful was his first period which reached from 1945 to 1954. Besides the three championships in the years 1949, 1950 and 1953 he also led the club to success in the Austrian Cup finals of 1948 and 1949. In the first three years at the helm of Austria he also played for league matches for the club.

In 1951, Austria undertook a nowadays legendary trip to South America. There the team around players like Ernst Ocwirk, Ernst Stojaspal and Lukas "Harry" Aurednik defeated in the huge Maracanã Stadium of Rio de Janeiro the Club Nacional from Montevideo, Uruguay, which had six World Cup winners from the tournament in the previous year in their line-up, with 4-0

From April 1953, Austrian players aged 30 or over were permitted to play abroad. Following the 1954 World Cup, many players left Austrian football, including several from Austria Wien, most of whom moved to France.

Also "Wudi" Müller chose to leave. Thus, in 1956 he could be found leading the Netherlands national team to a 3–2 win in Switzerland.

In the later 1950s and early 1960s he could be found at the helm of the Netherlands first division side Willem II in Tilburg.

In December 1964, after a stint with AEK in Athens, he returned to Austria trying to fill the gap left behind when Edi Frühwirt left the club. With Robert Sara, who should remain with the club for 21 years, Thomas Parits, and Hans "Buffy" Ettmayer the club had a number of promising talents in their roster.

Nevertheless, the club ended up seventh in the league and Ernst Ocwirk was placed as "sporting director" alongside Müller and replaced him fully by the end of the year.

In the 1971–72 season "Wudi" Müller made another comeback on the coaching bench of Austria, but this remained a venture as hapless as his previous one.

== Statistical summary ==
Era	Club	Successes
1971–1972	Austria Wien	
1964–1965	Austria Wien	
1963-1964	AEK Athens	1964 - Greek Cup
1960–1961	Willem II	
1958–1959	Willem II	
1956	Netherlands	
1946–1954	Austria Wien	1948 - Cup of Austria; 1949 - Championship of Austria; 1949 - Cup of Austria; 1950 - Championship of Austria; 1953 - Championship of Austria

=== Record as national coach of the Netherlands ===
Era	P	W - D - L
15/09/1956	1	1 - 0 - 0
