= Francisco Fedullo =

Uruguayan footballer (1905-1952)

Personal information
- Date of birth: 27 May 1905
- Place of birth: Montevideo, Uruguay
- Date of death: 30 November 1952 (aged 47)
- Position: Midfielder

Senior career*
Years	Team	Apps	(Gls)
1928–1930	Sud América		
1930–1939	Bologna	253	(54)

International career
1928	Uruguay	1	(0)
1932–33	Italy	2	(3)
Medal record
Italy
Central European International Cup
Silver medal – second place	1931-32 Central European International Cup
- * Club domestic league appearances and goals

Francisco Fedullo, also spelt as Francesco, (27 May 1905 – 30 November 1952) was a footballer who played international football for both Uruguay and Italy. He played as a midfielder or as a defender for Sud América and Bologna.

He scored a hat-trick for Italy in the silver winning 1931–32 Central European International Cup campaign against Switzerland.

Fedullo was the first Uruguayan footballer of Italian origin to play in Italy.

== Honours ==
Italy

- Central European International Cup: Runner-up: 1931–32
