= Erich Habitzl =

Austrian footballer (1923–2007)

Personal information
- Date of birth: 9 October 1923
- Place of birth: Austria
- Date of death: 26 September 2007 (aged 83)
- Position: Forward

Senior career*
Years	Team	Apps	(Gls)
1940–1954	SK Admira Wien		
1954–1956	RC Lens	63	(22)
1956–1957	FC Nantes	37	(19)
1957–1960	SK Admira Wien		

International career
1948–1951	Austria	11	(5)
- * Club domestic league appearances and goals

Erich Habitzl (9 October 1923 – 26 September 2007) was an Austrian footballer. He played for Austria at the 1948 Summer Olympics. After his international play, he played as a forward for Admira Wien, able to switch between center forward and inside right. Habitzl, Karl Huber, and Josef Eisener together formed a noted forward line for Admira.
