= Hans Haferkamp =

German footballer

Personal information
- Full name: Hans Haferkamp
- Date of birth: 11 October 1921
- Place of birth: Osnabrück, Germany
- Date of death: 30 June 1974 (aged 52)
- Position: Forward

Senior career*
Years	Team	Apps	(Gls)
1939–1944	TSV 1897 Osnabrück		
1946–1948	Eintracht Osnabrück		
1948–1956	VfL Osnabrück		

International career
1951–1952	West Germany	4	(2)
- * Club domestic league appearances and goals

Hans Haferkamp (11 October 1921 – 30 June 1974) was a German international footballer. Born in Osnabrück, Haferkamp played as a forward for VfL Osnabrück, and won four caps for West Germany between 1951 and 1952.
