= László Cseh (footballer) =

Hungarian footballer (1910–1950)

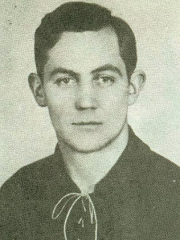

Personal information
- Full name: László Cseh
- Date of birth: 4 April 1910
- Place of birth: Hungary
- Date of death: 8 January 1950 (aged 39)
- Position: Forward

Senior career*
Years	Team	Apps	(Gls)
- MTK Hungária FC

International career
1930-1943	Hungary	34	(15)
Medal record
Representing Hungary
FIFA World Cup
Runner-up	1938 France
- * Club domestic league appearances and goals

László Cseh (4 April 1910 – 8 January 1950) was a Hungarian football forward who played for Hungary in the 1938 FIFA World Cup. He also played for MTK Hungária FC.

== Honours ==
MTK Hungária

- Nemzeti Bajnokság I: 1935-36, 1936-37
- Magyar Kupa: 1931-32

Individual

- Nemzeti Bajnokság I top scorer: 1934-35 (23 goals), 1936-37 (36 goals)
- European top scorer: 1936-37
