= Adolf Knoll =

Austrian footballer (1938–2018)

Personal information
- Full name: Adolf Knoll
- Date of birth: 17 March 1938
- Place of birth: Austria
- Date of death: 21 September 2018 (aged 80)
- Position: Midfielder

Senior career*
Years	Team	Apps	(Gls)
1956–1967	Wiener Sport-Club	229	(88)
1967–1969	FK Austria Wien	30	(5)
1969–1975	Alpine Donawitz		

International career
1957–1966	Austria	21	(2)
- * Club domestic league appearances and goals

Adolf Knoll (17 March 1938 – 21 September 2018) was an Austrian professional football player.

== Career ==
Knoll played for several clubs, including Wiener Sport-Club, FK Austria Wien and Alpine Donawitz. He also played for the Austria national football team earning 21 caps, scoring 2 goals.
