= Wilhelm Hahnemann =

Austrian footballer

Personal information
- Full name: Wilhelm Hahnemann
- Date of birth: 14 April 1914
- Place of birth: Vienna, Austria-Hungary
- Date of death: 23 August 1991 (aged 77)
- Place of death: Vienna, Austria
- Position: Striker

Youth career
- SR Donaufeld

Senior career*
Years	Team	Apps	(Gls)
1931–1941	Admira Vienna	263	(189)
1945–1952	SC Wacker Wien	129	(75)

International career
1935–1948	Austria	23	(4)
1938–1941	Germany	23	(16)

Managerial career
- 1952–1953: First Vienna
- 1953–1955: SpVgg Greuther Fürth
- 1955–1958: Grasshopper Club Zürich
- 1958–1959: FC Biel/Bienne
- 1959–1960: SC Wacker Wien
- 1960–1961: FC Biel/Bienne
- 1961–1962: FC Wacker Innsbruck
- 1964–1965: Hütteldorfer AC
- 1966–1967: FC Lausanne-Sport
- 1968–1970: Wiener AC
- 1970–1971: FV Biberach
- * Club domestic league appearances and goals

Wilhelm 'Willi' Hahnemann (14 April 1914 – 23 August 1991) was an Austrian and German football player who started his career at Admira Vienna.

== Club career ==
In the 1935-36 Austrian league season he netted 23 goals for his club to become the league's top scorer. On 13 September 1943 Hahnemann played in a friendly for Slavia Prague. Hahnemann scored 9 and Josef Bican scored 8 in a 20-1 victory against SK Uhonice.

== International career ==
Hahnemann played 23 games from 1935 to 1948 for the Austria national football team and scored four goals in these appearances.

After the Anschluss that united Austria and Germany, Hahnemann played 23 matches for Germany's national team between 1938 and 1941, scoring 16 goals. He also appeared with the German squad that took part in the 1938 World Cup in France.

In a 1940 international match he managed the feat of a double hat-trick in a 13:0 victory over Finland. The only player to score more goals for Germany in a single match was Gottfried Fuchs who scored 10 times against Russia at the 1912 Olympic games in Stockholm. He also played for Austria at the 1948 Summer Olympics.

After his playing career, he became a manager with SpVgg Greuther Fürth and in Switzerland.

== Honours ==
- Austrian Football Championship (6):
  - 1932, 1934, 1936, 1937, 1939, 1947
- Austrian Cup (3):
  - 1932, 1934, 1947
- Austrian Bundesliga Top Goalscorer (1):
  - 1936
