= Karl Decker (footballer) =

Austrian footballer and manager

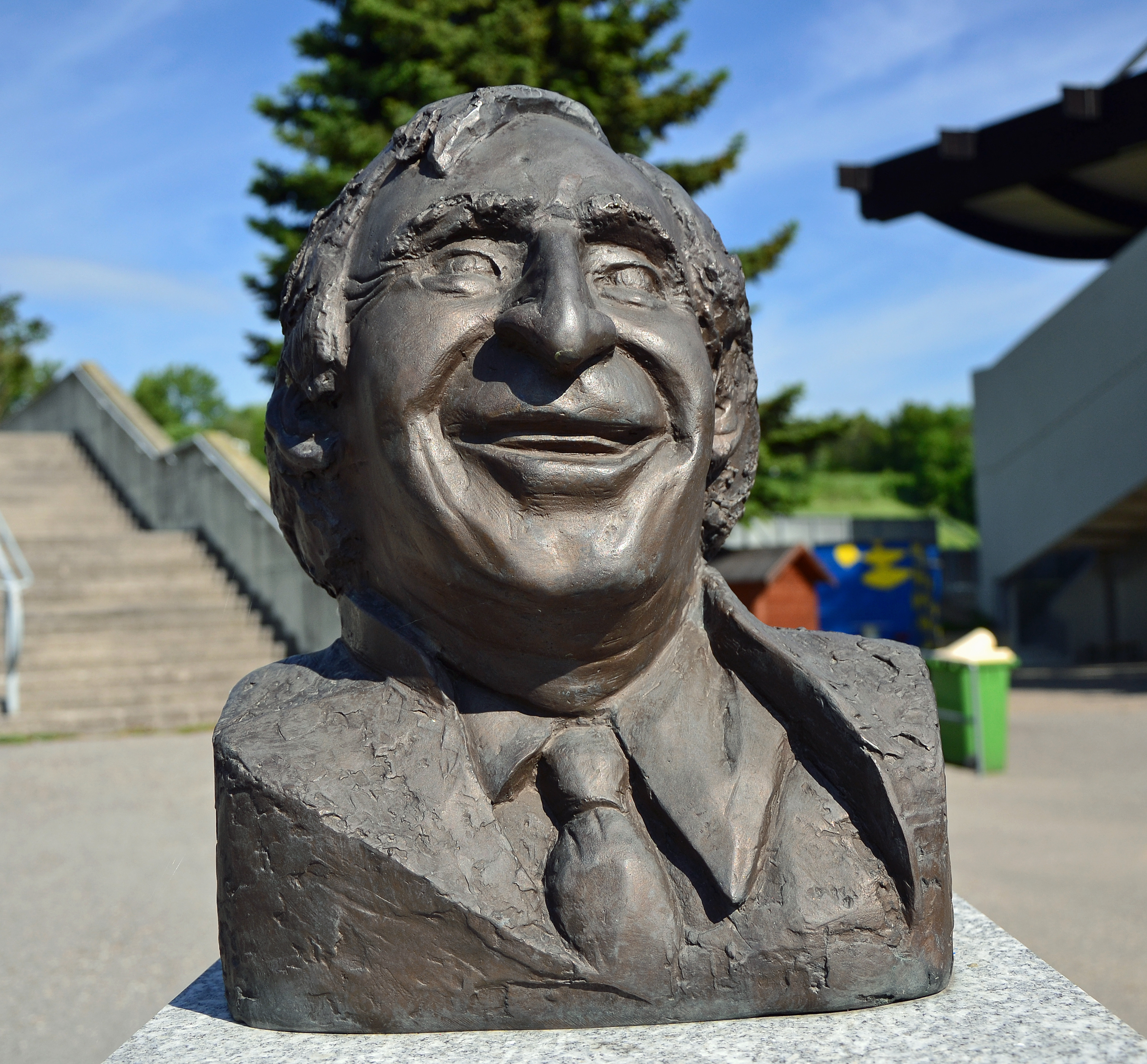
- Karl Decker – Memorial in Austria

Personal information
- Date of birth: 5 September 1921
- Place of birth: Vienna, Austria
- Date of death: 27 September 2005 (aged 84)
- Positions: Attacking midfielder; inside forward

Youth career
- 1934: Ottakringer SC
- 1934–1937: Schwarz-Weiß Wien
- 1937: Weiße Elf Penzing

Senior career*
Years	Team	Apps	(Gls)
1937–1952	First Vienna FC	226	(244)
1952–1954	SK Sturm Graz	36	(22)
1954–1956	FC Sochaux-Montbéliard	37	(15)
1956–1958	FC Grenchen	1	(0)

International career
1942	Germany	8	(8)
1945–1952	Austria	25	(19)

Managerial career
- 1951–1952: First Vienna
- 1952–1954: Sturm Graz
- 1956–1958: FC Grenchen
- 1958–1964: Austria
- 1964–1965: Wiener Sport-Club
- 1966–1968: Wiener Sport-Club
- 1968–1970: SK Rapid Wien
- * Club domestic league appearances and goals

Karl Decker (5 September 1921 – 27 September 2005) was an Austrian footballer and manager.

== International career ==
As a player Decker played for both Germany and Austria national football team, scoring 27 goals in 33 matches. He was also part of Austria's squad for the football tournament at the 1948 Summer Olympics, but he did not play in any matches.

== Honours ==
- Austrian Football Bundesliga (3):
  - 1942, 1943, 1944
- Austrian Cup (1):
  - 1943
- Austrian Bundesliga Top Goalscorer (2):
  - 1944, 1950

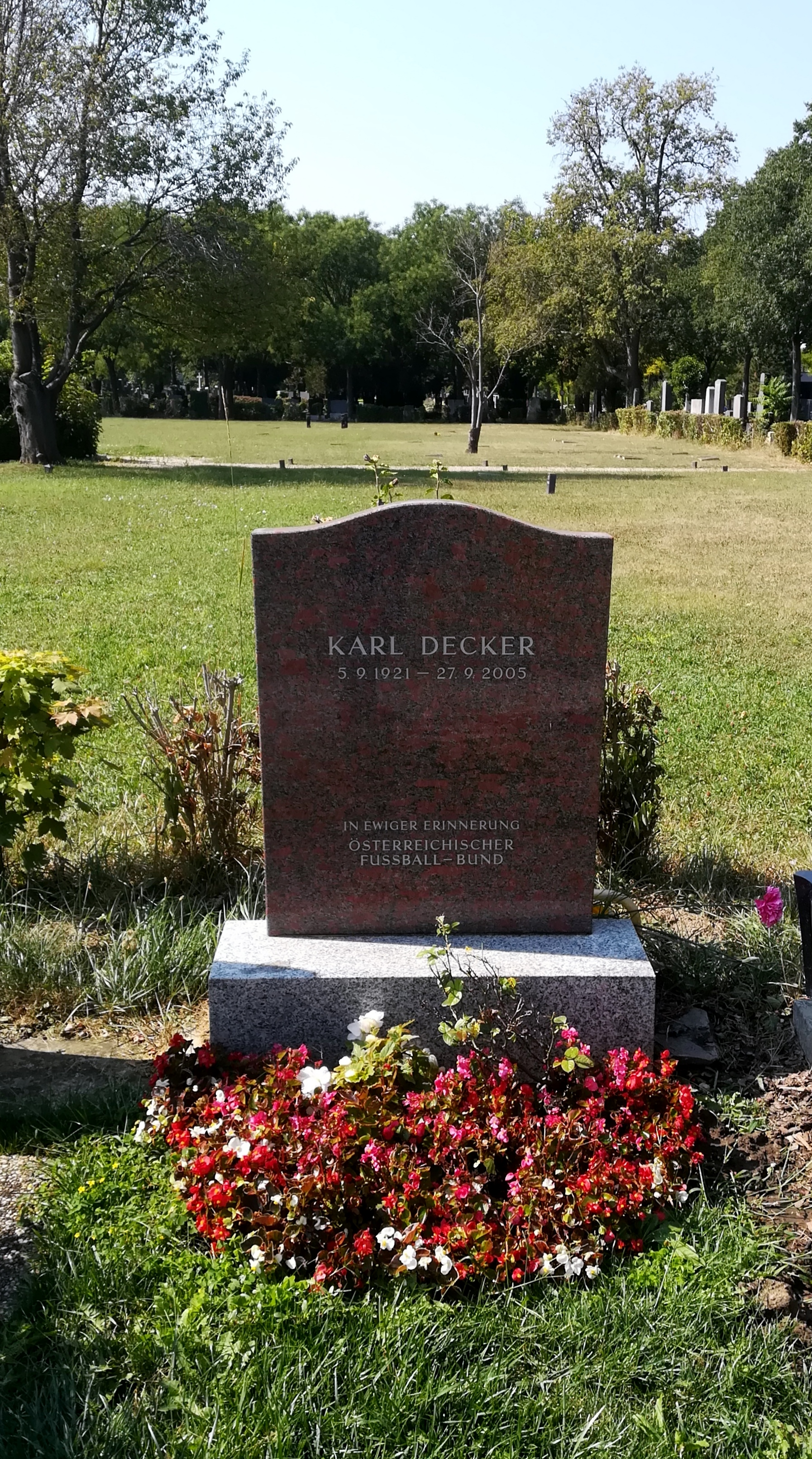
Vienna Central Cemetery grave of Karl Decker
