= Jenő Kalmár =

Hungarian footballer and coach

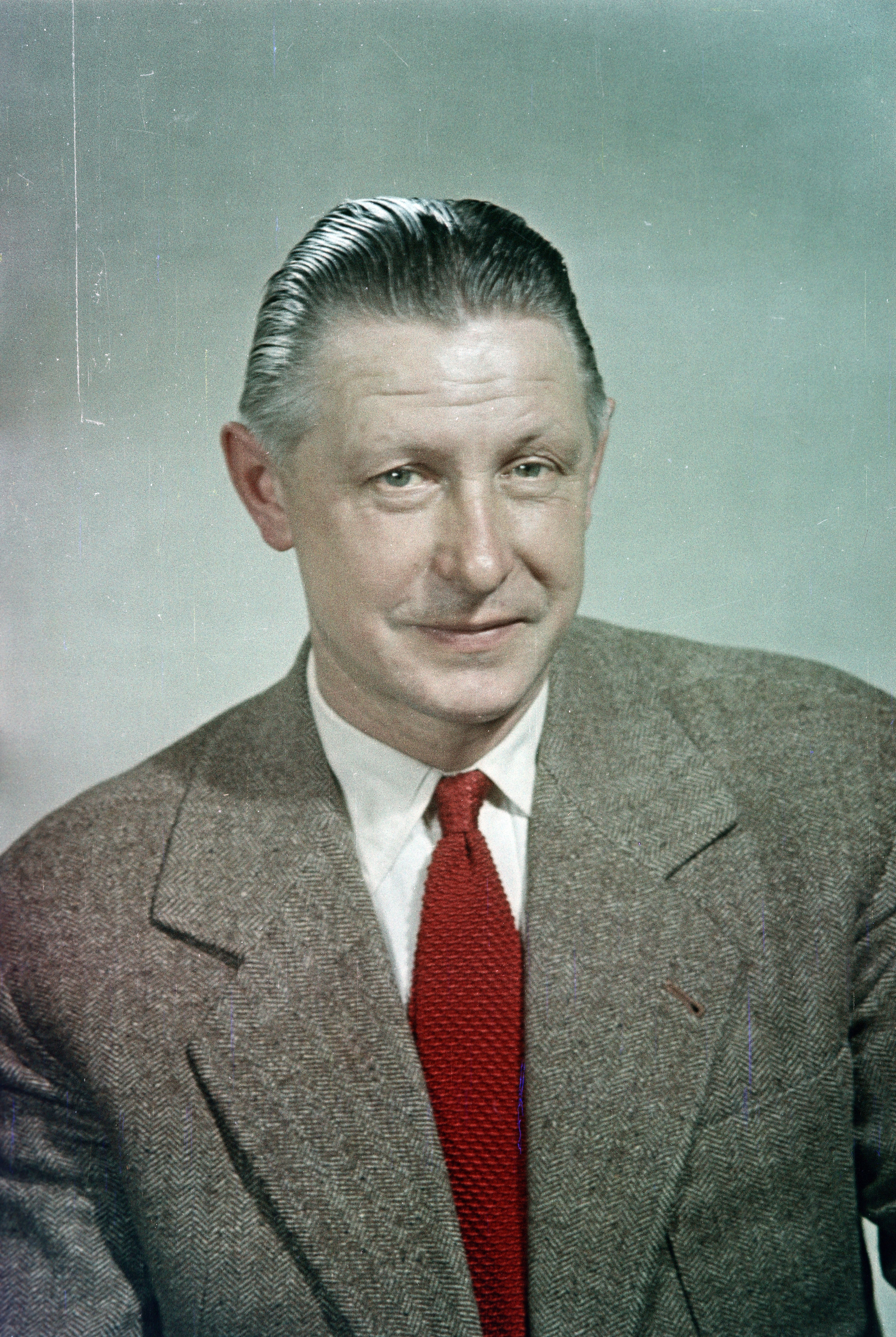

Personal information
- Date of birth: 21 March 1908
- Place of birth: Mocsolád, Hungary
- Date of death: 13 January 1990 (aged 81)
- Place of death: Málaga, Spain
- Position: Forward

Senior career*
| Years | Team | Apps | (Gls) |
| 1928–1933 | MTK Hungária | 69 | (44) |
| 1934–1936 | Excelsior Roubaix | | |
| 1936–1937 | RC Roubaix | | |
| 1937 | Stade de Reims | | |
| 1938 | MTK Hungária | 7 | (5) |
| 1939–1940 | MTK Hungária | 5 | (6) |
| 1945–1948 | Egység | | |

International career
| 1928–1932 | Hungary | 15 | (4) |

Managerial career
- 1952–56: Honvéd
- 1956–58: Wacker Wien
- 1958: Sevilla
- 1958–60: Granada
- 1960–62: Hapoel Tel Aviv
- 1962–63: Porto
- 1964–65: Valladolid
- 1965–66: Granada
- 1966: Halmstads BK
- 1966–68: Español
- 1970: Real Zaragoza
- 1970–72: CD Málaga
- 1972–73: Hércules
- 1978–80: CD Málaga
- * Club domestic league appearances and goals

Jenő Kalmár (21 March 1908 – 13 January 1990), also referred to as János Kalmar, was a Hungarian footballer and coach. As a player, Kalmar played for both MTK Hungária FC and Hungary. During the 1928-29 season he finished as top goalscorer for MTK, scoring 20 goals.

In the early 1950s, Kálmár was manager at Honvéd and with a team that included Ferenc Puskás, Zoltán Czibor, Sándor Kocsis, József Bozsik, László Budai, Gyula Lóránt and Gyula Grosics, he guided them to four Hungarian League titles. As the Honvéd manager, he also played a prominent role in the development of the legendary Hungary team known as the Mighty Magyars and during this era he also served as an assistant coach to the national team coach, Gusztáv Sebes. At the end of Second World War he found himself in Yugoslavia and he joined third league side FK TSC, known at time as Egység.

After the Hungarian Revolution, Kálmár like his former players, Puskás, Czibor and Kocsis, ended up in Spain where he managed several La Liga clubs with moderate success. He coached Wacker Wien, and after a brief spell at Sevilla CF, he guided Granada CF to the 1959 Copa del Generalísimo final. They lost 4–1 to a CF Barcelona team that included Kocsis. Kocsis scored twice for Barça while the Granada CF goal was scored by Arsenio Iglesias. In 1967, Kálmár took RCD Español to third in La Liga and during two spells with CD Málaga in the 1970s he guided them to promotion twice.

== Honours ==
=== Manager ===
Honvéd

- Hungarian League: 1952, 1954, 1955

Granada

- Copa del Generalísimo runner-up: 1959

CD Málaga

- Segunda División runner-up: 1970, 1979

=== Player ===
MTK Hungária

- Hungarian League runner-up: 1928-29, 1930–31, 1932–33, 1939–40
- Hungarian Cup: 1931-32

== See also ==
- List of Eastern Bloc defectors
