= Gábor P. Szabó =

Hungarian footballer

Personal information
- Full name: Gábor Péter Szabó
- Date of birth: 14 October 1902
- Place of birth: Austria-Hungary
- Date of death: 26 February 1950 (aged 47)
- Position: Forward

International career
| Years | Team | Apps | (Gls) |
- Hungary

Gábor Péter Szabó (14 October 1902 – 26 February 1950) was a Hungarian footballer who played for Újpest FC, as well as representing the Hungary national football team at the 1934 FIFA World Cup. He played 11 games and scored six goals for the Hungary national team as a left winger.

P. Szabó won the 1929 Mitropa Cup and the 1930 Coupe des Nations with Újpest FC.
