= Lipót Kállai =

Hungarian footballer (1912–1989)

Personal information
- Date of birth: 27 December 1912
- Place of birth: Budapest, Austria-Hungary
- Date of death: 15 November 1989 (aged 76)
- Place of death: Pécs, Hungary

International career
Years	Team	Apps	(Gls)
1936–1938	Hungary	6	(4)

Lipót Kállai (27 December 1912 – 15 November 1989) was a Hungarian footballer. He competed in the men's tournament at the 1936 Summer Olympics.
