= Fritz Gschweidl =

Austrian footballer and coach

Personal information
- Full name: Friedrich Gschweidl
- Date of birth: 13 December 1901
- Place of birth: Vienna, Austria-Hungary
- Date of death: 5 April 1970 (aged 68)
- Place of death: Vienna, Austria
- Position: Inside right

Senior career*
Years	Team	Apps	(Gls)
1919–1920	Strebersdorf		
1920–1924	SC Bewegung XX		
1924–1948	Vienna		

International career
1924–1931	Austria	44	(12)

Managerial career
- 1935–1948: Vienna
- 1948–1949: Young Boys
- * Club domestic league appearances and goals

Fritz Gschweidl (13 December 1901 – 5 April 1970) was an Austrian footballer and coach. He played mainly as an inside right and was noted for his technical ability and unselfish style of play.
