= Ernst Kozlicek =

Austrian footballer (1931–2023)

Personal information
- Date of birth: 27 January 1931
- Place of birth: Vienna, Austria
- Date of death: 16 August 2023 (aged 92)
- Position: Midfielder

Senior career*
Years	Team	Apps	(Gls)
1947–1959	Admira Wien	176	(9)
1960–1962	LASK	71	(1)
1963–1965	SV Schwechat	26	(4)
1965–1966	Sturm Graz	13	(1)
Total		286	(15)

International career
1954–1958	Austria	11	(2)
- * Club domestic league appearances and goals

Ernst Kozlicek (27 January 1931 – 16 August 2023) was an Austrian football midfielder who played for Austria in the 1958 FIFA World Cup. He also played for FC Admira Wacker Mödling, LASK, SV Schwechat, and Sturm Graz.

Kozlicek died on 16 August 2023, at the age of 92.
