= Adolf Vogl =

Austrian football forward

Personal information
- Date of birth: 4 May 1910
- Place of birth: Vienna, Austria-Hungary
- Date of death: 9 April 1993 (aged 82)
- Place of death: Kristianstad, Sweden
- Position: Forward

Senior career*
Years	Team	Apps	(Gls)
1927–1937	Admira Wien		
1937–1938	Excelsior AC Roubaix		
1938–1939	Wiener AC		

International career
1931–1936	Austria	20	(6)
- * Club domestic league appearances and goals

Adolf 'Adi' Vogl (4 May 1910 – 9 April 1993) was an Austrian football forward. He played for 20 caps for Austria, with also scoring six goals. Vogl also played for FC Admira Wacker Mödling, Excelsior AC Roubaix and Wiener AC. He participated at the 1934 Mitropa Cup. Vogl was named after lanes in Floridsdorf.
