= Otto Walzhofer =

Austrian footballer and coach

Personal information
- Date of birth: 21 June 1926
- Date of death: 22 September 2000 (aged 74)
- Position: Striker

Senior career*
Years	Team	Apps	(Gls)
–1946	Columbia		
1946–1950	FAC	59	(24)
1950–1959	First Vienna FC	208	(146)
1958–1960	LASK	24	(4)
1959–1963	Wacker Wien		

International career
1950–1957	Austria	13	(3)

Managerial career
- 1973–1978: First Vienna FC
- * Club domestic league appearances and goals

Otto Walzhofer (21 June 1926 – 22 September 2000) was an Austrian footballer and coach.
