= Noud van Melis =

Dutch footballer (1924–2001)

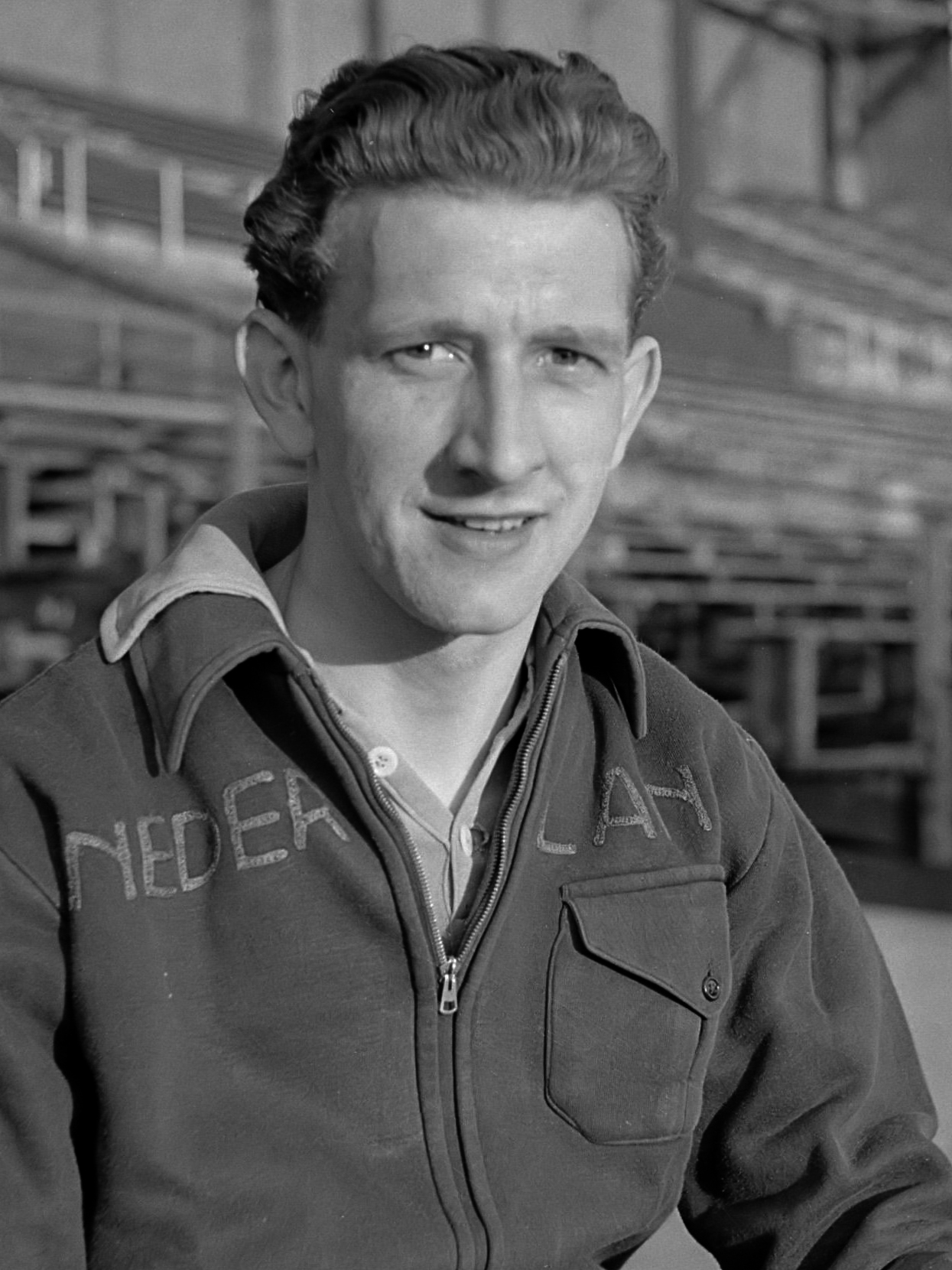
- Van Melis in 1951

Personal information
- Full name: Arnoldus Cornelis van Melis
- Date of birth: 10 February 1924
- Place of birth: Eindhoven, Netherlands
- Date of death: 8 August 2001 (aged 77)
- Place of death: Geldrop, Netherlands
- Position: Centre forward

Senior career*
Years	Team	Apps	(Gls)
- RKVV Tongelre
1946–1954	EVV Eindhoven		
1954–1958	Rapid JC	62	(27)
1958–1960	EVV Eindhoven		

International career
1950–1957	Netherlands	13	(15)
- * Club domestic league appearances and goals

Noud van Melis (10 February 1924 – 8 August 2001) was a Dutch footballer, who played as a centre forward.

== Club career ==
Van Melis was born in Eindhoven and started playing football at local third-level club RKVV Tongelre. In 1946, he moved to EVV Eindhoven. Over time, a team was built around the proficient goalscorer Van Melis. During the early 1950s, this team was among the best in the Netherlands, culminating in the 1953–54 season, in which they became national champions.

After the 1953–54 season, professional football was introduced in the Netherlands, and Van Melis took the opportunity to get paid by moving to Rapid JC. In the 1955–56 season, he was an important part of the Rapid JC squad which became Dutch champions.

In 1958, he returned to EVV Eindhoven, who by then had descended to the Eerste Divisie. After two seasons, he retired at the age of 36.

A stand at the Jan Louwers Stadion, home stadium of FC Eindhoven (as EVV Eindhoven is now known), is named after him.

== International career ==
Van Melis earned 13 caps for the Netherlands between 1950 and 1957. He scored in each of his first eight international appearances, netting twelve goals. In total, he scored 15 times. In 1952, he was selected for the Dutch squad at the Summer Olympics, but did not make an appearance.

== Style of play ==
Van Melis was known as a very productive goalscorer who was adept at positioning. Despite being positioned on the pitch as a traditional centre forward, he also possessed qualities associated with more modern forwards, due to his pace, technique, and insight.

== Career statistics ==
Appearances and goals by national team and year
National team	Year	Apps	Goals
Netherlands	1950	3	3
Netherlands	1951	4	8
Netherlands	1952	2	1
Netherlands	1953	1	0
Netherlands	1954	1	0
Netherlands	1955	0	0
Netherlands	1956	0	0
Netherlands	1957	2	3
Total		13	15

Scores and results list the Netherlands goal tally first, score column indicates score after each van Melis goal.

List of international goals scored by Noud van Melis
No.	Date	Venue	Opponent	Score	Result	Competition
1	15 October 1950	Stadion Rankhof, Basel, Switzerland	Switzerland	4–4	5–7	Friendly
2	12 November 1950	Bosuilstadion, Antwerp, Belgium	Belgium	1–4	2–7	Friendly
3	10 December 1950	Stade Olympique Yves-du-Manoir, Colombes, France	France	1–2	2–5	Friendly
4	15 April 1951	Olympisch Stadion, Amsterdam, Netherlands	Belgium	1–0	5–4	Friendly
5	15 April 1951	Olympisch Stadion, Amsterdam, Netherlands	Belgium	2–3	5–4	Friendly
6	15 April 1951	Olympisch Stadion, Amsterdam, Netherlands	Belgium	3–3	5–4	Friendly
7	6 June 1951	Stadion Feijenoord, Rotterdam, Netherlands	Norway	1–2	2–3	Friendly
8	27 October 1951	Stadion Feijenoord, Rotterdam, Netherlands	Finland	2–1	4–4	Friendly
9	27 October 1951	Stadion Feijenoord, Rotterdam, Netherlands	Finland	3–4	4–4	Friendly
10	27 October 1951	Stadion Feijenoord, Rotterdam, Netherlands	Finland	4–4	4–4	Friendly
11	25 November 1951	Stadion Feijenoord, Rotterdam, Netherlands	Belgium	6–7	6–7	Friendly
12	6 April 1952	Bosuilstadion, Antwerp, Belgium	Belgium	1–1	2–4	Friendly
13	26 May 1957	Praterstadion, Vienna, Austria	Austria	1–0	2–3	1958 FIFA World Cup qualification
14	26 May 1957	Praterstadion, Vienna, Austria	Austria	2–0	2–3	1958 FIFA World Cup qualification
15	11 September 1957	Stadion Feijenoord, Rotterdam, Netherlands	Luxembourg	4–1	5–2	1958 FIFA World Cup qualification

== Honours ==
EVV Eindhoven

- Netherlands Football League Championship: 1953–54

Rapid JC

- Netherlands Football League Championship: 1955–56
