= Karl Sesta =

Austrian footballer (1906–1974)

Personal information
- Date of birth: 18 March 1906
- Place of birth: Simmering, Vienna, Austria-Hungary
- Date of death: 12 July 1974 (aged 68)
- Place of death: Hainburg an der Donau, Austria
- Height: 1.65 m (5 ft 5 in)
- Position: Defender

Youth career
- 1919–1924: Vorwärts XI

Senior career*
Years	Team	Apps	(Gls)
1924–1927	1. Simmeringer SC		
1927–1928	FK Teplice		
1928–1934	Wiener AC		
1934–1943	FK Austria Wien		
- LSV Markersdorf an der Pielach
1945–1946	First Vienna FC		
- SPC Helfort Wien

International career
1932–1945	Austria	44	(1)
1941–1942	Germany	3	(0)

Managerial career
- 1952–1953: BC Augsburg
- * Club domestic league appearances and goals

Karl Sesta (18 March 1906 – 12 July 1974) was a footballer who played as a defender. He represented both the Austrian and German national sides.

== Club career ==
He played club football for Vorwärts XI, 1. Simmeringer SC, FK Teplice, Wiener AC, FK Austria Wien, LSV Markersdorf an der Pielach, First Vienna FC and SPC Helfort Wien.

== International career ==
He made his debut for Austria in May 1932 against Czechoslovakia and he participated at the 1934 FIFA World Cup. He earned 44 caps for Austria, scoring one goal. He made three appearances for Germany between 1941 and 1942.
