= Walter Haummer =

Austrian footballer

Personal information
- Date of birth: 22 November 1928
- Place of birth: Austria
- Date of death: 5 October 2008 (aged 79)
- Position: Forward

Senior career*
Years	Team	Apps	(Gls)
1949–1961	Admira Wacker	258	(140)

International career
1952–1957	Austria	16	(4)
Medal record
Representing Austria
FIFA World Cup
Third place	1954 Switzerland
- * Club domestic league appearances and goals

Walter Haummer (22 November 1928 - 5 October 2008) was an Austrian football forward who played for Austria in the 1954 FIFA World Cup. He also played for FC Admira Wacker Mödling.
