= Adolf Huber =

Austrian footballer

Personal information
- Date of birth: 5 March 1923
- Place of birth: Vienna, Austria
- Date of death: 30 November 1993 (aged 70)
- Position: Forward

Senior career*
Years	Team	Apps	(Gls)
1937–1957	FK Austria Wien	165	(127)
1957–1958	1. Wiener Neustädter SC		

International career
1949–1953	Austria	13	(10)

Managerial career
- 1958–1962: 1. Wiener Neustädter SC
- 1962–1968: FC Wien
- 1968–1970: 1. Schwechater SC
- * Club domestic league appearances and goals

Adolf Huber (5 March 1923 – 30 November 1993) was an Austrian football forward who played for Austria. He also played for FK Austria Wien and 1. Wiener Neustädter SC.
