= Ernst Stojaspal =

Austrian footballer (1925–2002)

Personal information
- Full name: Ernst Stojaspal
- Date of birth: 14 January 1925
- Place of birth: Simmering, Vienna, Austria
- Date of death: 3 April 2002 (aged 77)
- Place of death: Moulins-lès-Metz, France
- Position: Forward

Youth career
- 1935–1936: FC Strindberg
- 1937–1938: Mautner Markhof
- 1938–1939: 1. Simmeringer SC
- 1939–1941: SC Ostbahn XI

Senior career*
Years	Team	Apps	(Gls)
1941–1944	SC Ostbahn XI		
1944–1954	Austria Wien	184	(220)
1954–1957	Strasbourg	95	(57)
1957–1958	AS Béziers	23	(5)
1958–1959	Monaco	23	(10)
1959–1961	Troyes	62	(22)
1961–1962	Metz	19	(6)
Total		408	(320)

International career
1946–1954	Austria	32	(14)
Medal record
Representing Austria
FIFA World Cup
Third place	1954 Switzerland
- * Club domestic league appearances and goals

Ernst Stojaspal (14 January 1925 – 3 April 2002) was an Austrian professional footballer. He was born in Vienna. He was a forward or attacking midfielder noted for his prolific goalscoring record and technical ability.

== Club career ==
A prolific striker, the left-footed Stojaspal played for Austria Wien for 10 years, winning three league titles and two domestic cups. Also, he topped the final goalscoring charts five times. After the 1954 World Cup, he moved abroad to play for Racing Strasbourg, AS Béziers, AS Monaco, Troyes AC and FC Metz in France. Stojaspal scored 481 goals in 413 games for Austria Wien and scored 674 goals in his career, both including friendlies.

In 2001, he was chosen in Austria's Team of the Century.

== International career ==
Stojaspal made his debut for Austria in December 1946 against Italy and was a participant at the 1954 FIFA World Cup where he scored three goals in four matches. The third-place playoff against Uruguay proved to be his final international game. He earned 32 caps, scoring 14 goals. He was also part of Austria's squad for the football tournament at the 1948 Summer Olympics, but he did not play in any matches.

== Retirement ==
Stojaspal later worked as a football coach and led some French clubs, most notable AC Ajaccio. He died in Moulins-lès-Metz, France.

== Honours ==
- Austrian Football Bundesliga: 1949, 1950, 1953
- Austrian Cup: 1947, 1948
- Austrian Bundesliga top goalscorer: 1946, 1947, 1948, 1952, 1953
