= Ernst Ocwirk =

Austrian footballer (1926–1980)

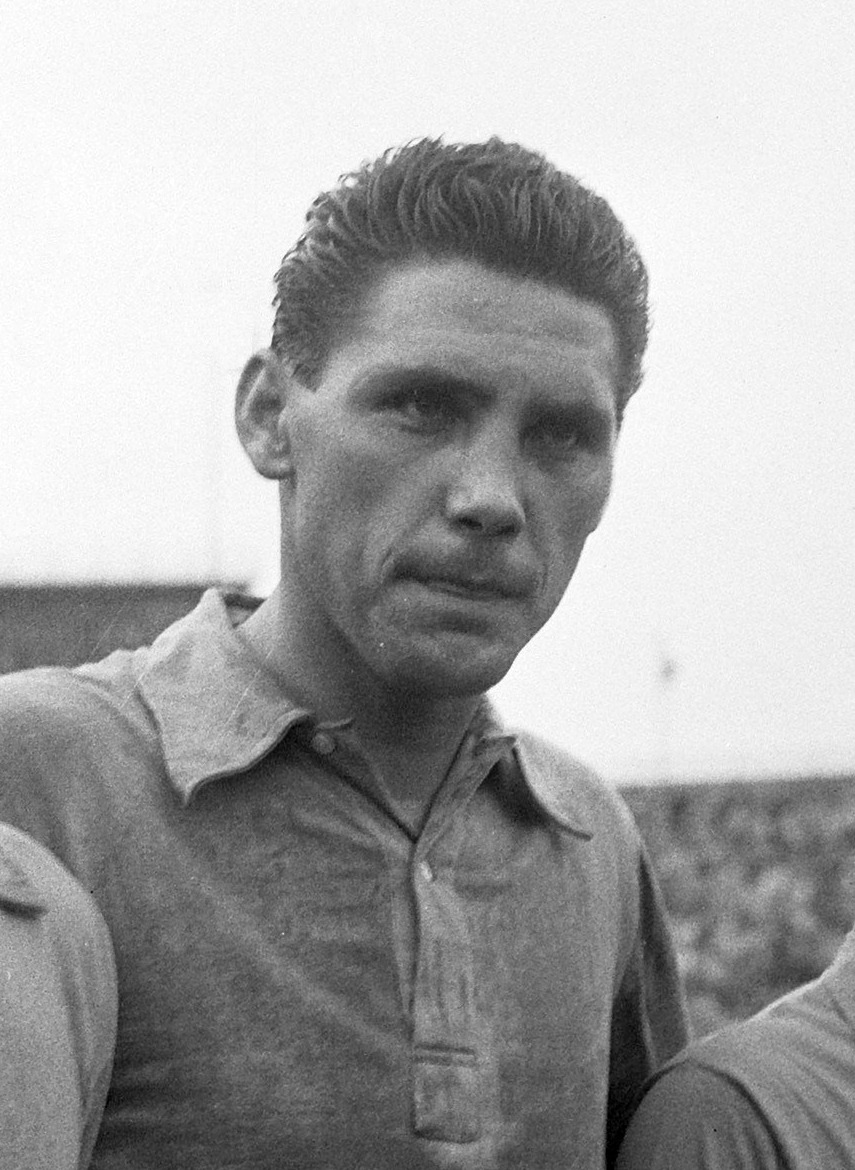
- Ocwirk in 1953

Personal information
- Date of birth: 7 March 1926
- Place of birth: Vienna, Austria
- Date of death: 23 January 1980 (aged 53)
- Place of death: Klein-Pöchlarn, Austria
- Height: 1.83 m (6 ft 0 in)
- Position: Midfielder

Youth career
- FC Stadlau

Senior career*
Years	Team	Apps	(Gls)
1942–1947	Floridsdorfer AC	83	(3)
1947–1956	Austria Wien	209	(31)
1956–1961	Sampdoria	154	(37)
1961–1963	Austria Wien	15	(5)
Total		461	(76)

International career
1945–1962	Austria	62	(6)

Managerial career
- 1962–1965: Sampdoria
- 1965–1970: Austria Wien
- 1970–1971: 1. FC Köln
- 1971–1973: Admira Wacker
Medal record
Representing Austria
FIFA World Cup
Third place	1954 Switzerland
- * Club domestic league appearances and goals

Ernst Ocwirk (7 March 1926 – 23 January 1980) was an Austrian football player and coach. A former midfielder, he is regarded as one of the greatest Austrian men's footballers of all time.

He spent the majority of his playing and coaching years between Austria and Italy, being both player and manager for FK Austria Vienna and Serie A club Sampdoria. He also went on to become a member of the Austria national team, which he led to a third-place finish at the 1954 World Cup as its captain.

Nicknamed Clockwork by the British for his midfield consistency, as well as the nickname being suggested by his surname, he is often cited as the last of the old-fashioned attacking centre-halves; he was known for his aesthetic and technical style of playing, his heading ability, excellent timing (both in offensive and defensive tasks) and his passing range; particularly his long passing ability. The fans loved him for his modest and fair personality. The international media of the era saw Ocwirk as "the best centerhalf in the world". He is considered one of the greatest central midfielders of all time.

== Club career ==
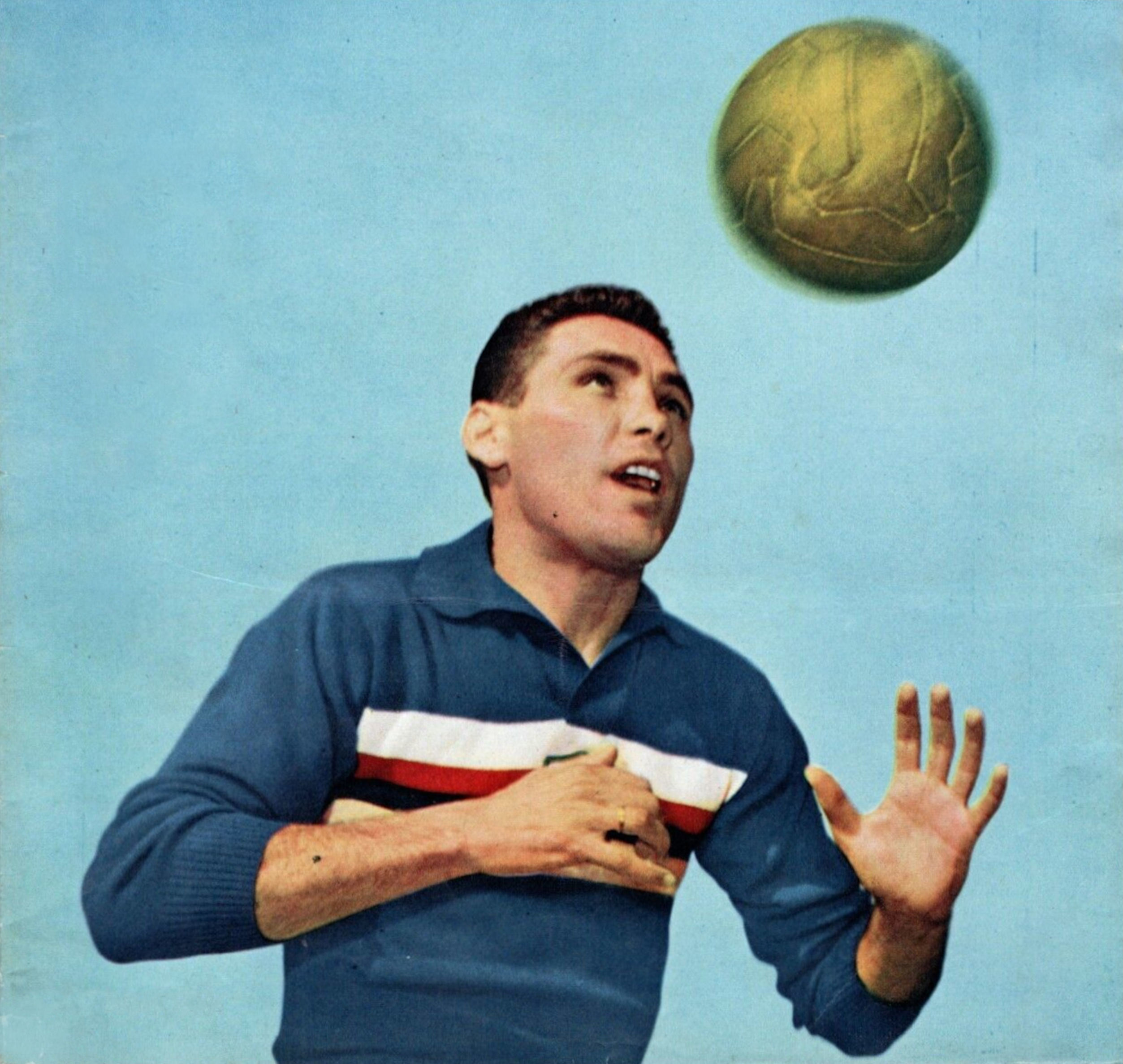
Ocwirk playing for Sampdoria in 1956

Born in Vienna, Ocwirk began his career as a striker. He joined his first club, the local FC Stadlau, in 1938. He then played for Floridsdorfer AC, where he was spotted by former Austrian international Josef Smistik, who moved Ocwirk to centre midfield. Smistik tried to bring him to his former team, Rapid Wien, but it was rivals FK Austria who won the race for his services and, in 1947, signed him.

In a decade at Austria Vienna, Ocwirk became one of the most prominent players for the club, helping them to win five Austrian League championships and three domestic cups.

Brought to Sampdoria by Alberto Ravano, he was the second Austrian footballer ever to play in Serie A after Engelbert König had done it in the 1940s. He also remained the last Austrian in Serie A until 1980, when Herbert Prohaska played for Inter Milan. Ocwirk would play five seasons at the Genova club, of which he became the captain. In 1961, he returned to FK Austria to play the final season of his career, winning the "double" in 1961–62.

Ocwirk was chosen in Austria's Team of the Century in 2001.

== International career ==
Ocwirk won 62 caps and scored six goals for his country. He made his debut for his country in 1945 before appearing at the 1948 Olympic Games in London.

By 1953, the stopper centre-back had taken over, so Ocwirk was selected as a wing-half for a Rest-of-the-World team which drew 4–4 with England to celebrate the 90th birthday of the Football Association. His international successes earned him the honour of twice being named captain of the "FIFA World team".

At the 1954 World Cup, Ocwirk captained Austria and played in all five of his team matches, helping it achieve its best ever World Cup finish, third place. The centre-half scored two goals during the tournament: the one that gave Austria the lead after trailing 3–0 in the memorable quarter-final against hosts Switzerland, and the 3–1 in the third-place match against reigning champions Uruguay.

== Coaching career ==
Immediately after retiring from playing, Ocwirk became a manager, and Sampdoria was the first team he coached, from 1962 to 1965. He also managed German side 1. FC Köln one year, taking them to the final of the DFB Cup.

== Death and legacy ==
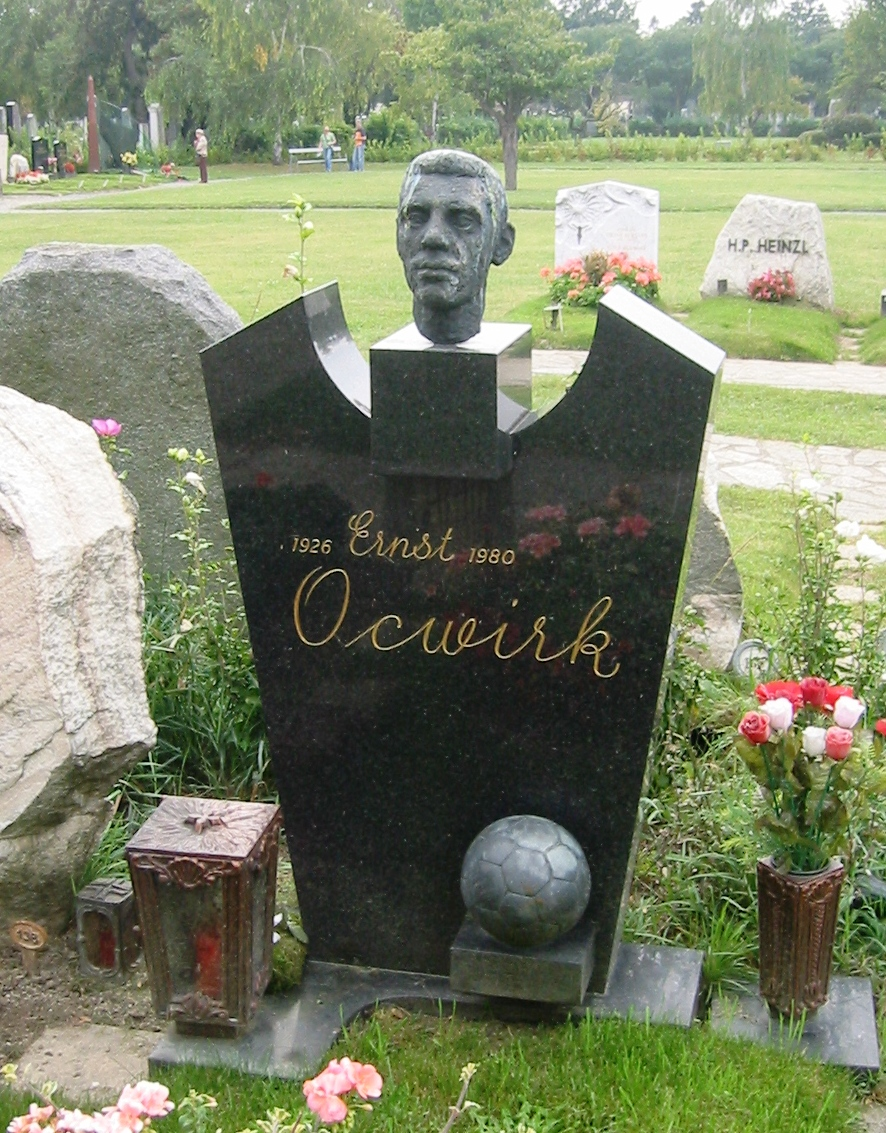
Ocwirk's grave at Vienna's Zentralfriedhof

In January 1980, at the age of 53, he died of multiple sclerosis, in Klein-Pöchlarn, Lower Austria. His death occurred on the same date that Matthias Sindelar died 41 years before.

A friendly tournament was played in July 1981 in homage to Ernst Ocwirk at Wiener Stadion. The participants were FK Austria Wien, SK Rapid Wien, Ferencvárosi TC and Bayern Munich. Bayern Munich won the tournament.

== Honours ==
Austria Wien

- Austrian Football Bundesliga: 1949, 1950, 1953, 1962, 1963
- Austrian Cup: 1948, 1949, 1962

Austria

- FIFA World Cup third place: 1954

Individual

- FIFA World Cup All-Star Team: 1954
- Serie A Team of The Year: 1957

Awards
Preceded by (Austria) Walter Zeman	Austrian Sportsman of the Year; 1951	Succeeded by (Austria) Othmar Schneider
