= Karl Zischek =

Austrian footballer (1910–1985)

Personal information
- Date of birth: 28 August 1910
- Place of birth: Austria-Hungary
- Date of death: 6 October 1985 (aged 75)
- Position: Forward

Senior career*
| Years | Team | Apps | (Gls) |
| 1926–1946 | SC Wacker Wien | 265 | (107) |

International career
| 1931–1945 | Austria | 40 | (24) |
- * Club domestic league appearances and goals

Karl Zischek (28 August 1910 – 6 October 1985) was an Austrian footballer who played as a forward for Austria in the 1934 FIFA World Cup. He also played for SC Wacker Wien.
