= Theodor Wagner =

Austrian footballer (1927–2020)

Personal information
- Full name: Theodor Wagner
- Date of birth: 6 August 1927
- Place of birth: Vienna, Austria
- Date of death: 21 January 2020 (aged 92)
- Place of death: Vienna, Austria
- Position: Striker

Senior career*
Years	Team	Apps	(Gls)
1946–1958	SC Wacker Wien	292	(175)
1958–1963	SVS Linz		
1963–1964	FC Wacker Innsbruck		

International career
1946–1957	Austria	46	(22)
Medal record
Representing Austria
FIFA World Cup
Third place	1954 Switzerland
- * Club domestic league appearances and goals

Theodor "Turl" Wagner (6 August 1927 – 21 January 2020) was an Austrian footballer who played as a striker.

== International career ==
He made his debut for Austria in a November 1946 friendly match against Switzerland and was a participant at the 1954 FIFA World Cup, where he scored a hat-trick in the 7–5 quarterfinal win over Switzerland. He earned 46 caps, scoring 22 goals. His last international was a March 1957 friendly match against West Germany. He was also part of Austria's squad for the football tournament at the 1948 Summer Olympics, but he did not play in any matches.

== Death ==
Wagner died on 21 January 2020 in Vienna, at the age of 92.
