= 1954 FIFA World Cup Group 3 =

Football tournament group stage

Group 3 of the 1954 FIFA World Cup took place from 16 to 19 June 1954. The group consisted of Austria, Czechoslovakia, Scotland, and Uruguay.

== Standings ==
Pos	Team	Pld	W	D	L	GF	GA	GD	Pts	Qualification
1	Uruguay	2	2	0	0	9	0	+9	4	Advance to the knockout stage
1	Austria	2	2	0	0	6	0	+6	4	Advance to the knockout stage
3	Czechoslovakia	2	0	0	2	0	7	−7	0	
3	Scotland	2	0	0	2	0	8	−8	0	

Source: FIFA

== Matches ==
All times listed are local time (CET, UTC+1).

=== Uruguay vs Czechoslovakia ===
16 June 1954
18:00

Uruguay	2–0	Czechoslovakia
Míguez 71'; Schiaffino 84'

Wankdorfstadion, Bern
Attendance: 20,500
Referee: Arthur Ellis (England)

Uruguay
Czechoslovakia

GK	1	Roque Máspoli
RB	4	Rodríguez Andrade
CB	2	José Santamaría
CB	3	William Martínez
LWB	17	Luis Cruz
CH	5	Obdulio Varela (c)
OR	7	Julio Abbadie
IR	19	Javier Ambrois
CF	9	Oscar Míguez
IL	10	Juan Schiaffino
OL	11	Carlos Borges
Manager:
(Uruguay) Juan López

GK	1	Theodor Reimann
DF	2	František Šafránek
DF	13	Jiří Hledík
LB	4	Ladislav Novák (c)
MF	5	Jiří Trnka
MF	14	Jan Hertl
FW	7	Ladislav Hlaváček
FW	8	Otto Hemele
FW	15	Ladislav Kačáni
FW	10	Emil Pažický
FW	11	Jiří Pešek
Manager:
(Czechoslovakia) Karol Borhy

=== Austria vs Scotland ===
16 June 1954
18:00

Austria	1–0	Scotland
Probst 33'

Hardturm Stadium, Zurich
Attendance: 25,000
Referee: Laurent Franken (Belgium)

Austria
Scotland

GK	1	Kurt Schmied
DF	2	Gerhard Hanappi
DF	3	Ernst Happel
DF	4	Leopold Barschandt
MF	5	Ernst Ocwirk (c)
MF	6	Karl Koller
FW	7	Robert Körner
FW	8	Walter Schleger
FW	19	Robert Dienst
FW	10	Erich Probst
FW	11	Alfred Körner
Manager:
(Austria) Walter Nausch

GK	1	Fred Martin
RB	2	Willie Cunningham (c)
LB	3	Jock Aird
RH	5	Tommy Docherty
CH	6	Jimmy Davidson
LH	7	Doug Cowie
OR	8	John Mackenzie
IR	12	Willie Fernie
CF	11	Neil Mochan
IL	10	Allan Brown
OL	13	Willie Ormond
Manager:
(Scotland) Andy Beattie

=== Uruguay vs Scotland ===
19 June 1954
16:50

Uruguay	7–0	Scotland
Borges 17', 47', 57'; Míguez 30', 83'; Abbadie 54', 85'

St. Jakob Stadium, Basel
Attendance: 34,000
Referee: Vincenzo Orlandini (Italy)

Uruguay
Scotland

GK	1	Roque Máspoli
RB	4	Rodríguez Andrade
CB	2	José Santamaría
CB	3	William Martínez
LWB	17	Luis Cruz
CH	5	Obdulio Varela (c)
OR	7	Julio Abbadie
IR	19	Javier Ambrois
CF	9	Oscar Míguez
IL	10	Juan Schiaffino
OL	11	Carlos Borges
Manager:
(Uruguay) Juan López

GK	1	Fred Martin
RB	2	Willie Cunningham (c)
LB	3	Jock Aird
RH	5	Tommy Docherty
CH	6	Jimmy Davidson
LH	7	Doug Cowie
OR	8	John Mackenzie
IR	12	Willie Fernie
CF	11	Neil Mochan
IL	10	Allan Brown
OL	13	Willie Ormond
Manager:
(Scotland) Selection committee

=== Austria vs Czechoslovakia ===
19 June 1954
17:00

Austria	5–0	Czechoslovakia
Stojaspal 3', 65'; Probst 4', 21', 24'

Hardturm Stadium, Zurich
Attendance: 26,000
Referee: Vasa Stefanovic (Yugoslavia)

Austria
Czechoslovakia

GK	1	Kurt Schmied
DF	2	Gerhard Hanappi
DF	3	Ernst Happel
DF	4	Leopold Barschandt
MF	5	Ernst Ocwirk (c)
MF	6	Karl Koller
FW	7	Robert Körner
FW	9	Theodor Wagner
FW	21	Ernst Stojaspal
FW	10	Erich Probst
FW	11	Alfred Körner
Manager:
(Austria) Walter Nausch

GK	21	Imrich Stacho
DF	2	František Šafránek
DF	3	Svatopluk Pluskal
LB	4	Ladislav Novák (c)
MF	5	Jiří Trnka
MF	14	Jan Hertl
FW	7	Ladislav Hlaváček
FW	8	Otto Hemele
FW	15	Ladislav Kačáni
FW	10	Emil Pažický
FW	17	Tadeáš Kraus
Manager:
(Czechoslovakia) Karol Borhy

== See also ==
- Austria at the FIFA World Cup
- Czech Republic at the FIFA World Cup
- Scotland at the FIFA World Cup
- Slovakia at the FIFA World Cup
- Uruguay at the FIFA World Cup
