= 1954 FIFA World Cup knockout stage =

Final stage of the competition

The knockout stage of the 1954 FIFA World Cup was the second and final stage of the competition, following the group stage. The knockout stage began on 26 June with the quarter-finals and ended on 4 July 1954 with the final match, held at the Wankdorfstadion in Bern. The top two teams from each group (eight in total) advanced to the knockout stage to compete in a single-elimination style tournament. A match for third place also was played between the two losing teams of the semi-finals.

West Germany won the final 3–2 against Hungary for their first World Cup title.

== Qualified teams ==
The top two placed teams from each of the four groups qualified for the knockout stage.

Group	Winners	Runners-up
1	Brazil	Yugoslavia
2	Hungary	West Germany
3	Uruguay	Austria
4	England	Switzerland

== Bracket ==
For each of the first two quarter-finals, one team progressing from group 1 was drawn against one team progressing from group 2. For the remaining two quarter-finals, this procedure was repeated for groups 3 and 4.

For the semi-finals, a further draw was held, with each semi-final featuring one team from groups 1–2 against one team from groups 3–4.

Quarter-finals
27 June – Geneva
West Germany	2
Yugoslavia	0
26 June – Lausanne
Austria	7
Switzerland	5
27 June – Bern
Hungary	4
Brazil	2
26 June – Basel
Uruguay	4
England	2

Semi-finals
30 June – Basel
West Germany	6
Austria	1
30 June – Lausanne
Hungary (a.e.t.)	4
Uruguay	2

Final
4 July – Bern
West Germany	3
Hungary	2
Match for third place
3 July – Zurich
Austria	3
Uruguay	1

== Quarter-finals ==
=== Austria vs Switzerland ===
26 June 1954
17:00 CET

Austria	7–5	Switzerland
Wagner 25', 27', 53'; A. Körner 26', 34'; Ocwirk 32'; Probst 76'		Ballaman 16', 39'; Hügi 17', 19', 60'

Stade Olympique de la Pontaise, Lausanne
Attendance: 35,000
Referee: Charlie Faultless (Scotland)

Austria
Switzerland

GK	1	Kurt Schmied
RB	2	Gerhard Hanappi
CB	3	Ernst Happel
LB	4	Leopold Barschandt
RH	5	Ernst Ocwirk (c)
LH	6	Karl Koller
OR	7	Robert Körner
IR	21	Ernst Stojaspal
CF	9	Theodor Wagner
IL	10	Erich Probst
OL	11	Alfred Körner
Manager:
Walter Nausch

GK	2	Eugene Parlier
DF	7	André Neury
DF	14	Willy Kernen
DF	10	Oliver Eggimann
MF	4	Roger Bocquet (c)
MF	9	Charles Casali
FW	15	Charles Antenen
FW	22	Roger Vonlanthen
FW	18	Josef Hügi
FW	16	Robert Ballaman
FW	17	Jacques Fatton
Manager:
(Austria) Karl Rappan

Assistant referees:
Emil Schmetzer (West Germany)
Manuel Asensi (Spain)

=== Uruguay vs England ===
26 June 1954
17:00 CET

Uruguay	4–2	England
Borges 5'; Varela 39'; Schiaffino 46'; Ambrois 78'		Lofthouse 16'; Finney 67'

St. Jakob Stadium, Basel
Attendance: 28,000
Referee: Carl Erich Steiner (Austria)

Uruguay
England

GK	1	Roque Máspoli
RB	4	Rodríguez Andrade
CB	2	José Santamaría
CB	3	William Martínez
LWB	17	Luis Cruz
CH	5	Obdulio Varela (c)
OR	7	Julio Abbadie
IR	19	Javier Ambrois
CF	9	Oscar Míguez
IL	10	Juan Schiaffino
OL	11	Carlos Borges
Manager:
(Uruguay) Juan López

GK	1	Gil Merrick
RB	2	Ron Staniforth
LB	3	Roger Byrne
RH	14	Bill McGarry
CH	4	Billy Wright (c)
LH	6	Jimmy Dickinson
OR	7	Stanley Matthews
IR	8	Ivor Broadis
CF	9	Nat Lofthouse
IL	15	Dennis Wilshaw
OL	11	Tom Finney
Manager:
(England) Walter Winterbottom

=== West Germany vs Yugoslavia ===
27 June 1954
17:00 CET

West Germany	2–0	Yugoslavia
Horvat 9' (o.g.); Rahn 85'

Stade des Charmilles, Geneva
Attendance: 17,000
Referee: Istvan Zsolt (Hungary)

West Germany
Yugoslavia

GK	1	Toni Turek
RB	2	Fritz Laband
CH	10	Werner Liebrich
LB	3	Werner Kohlmeyer
RH	6	Horst Eckel
LH	8	Karl Mai
OR	12	Helmut Rahn
IR	13	Max Morlock
CF	15	Ottmar Walter
IL	16	Fritz Walter (c)
OL	20	Hans Schäfer
Manager:
(West Germany) Sepp Herberger

GK	1	Vladimir Beara
RB	2	Branko Stanković
CH	5	Ivica Horvat
LB	3	Tomislav Crnković
RH	4	Zlatko Čajkovski
LH	6	Vujadin Boškov
FW	18	Miloš Milutinović
IF	8	Rajko Mitić (c)
CF	9	Bernard Vukas
IF	10	Stjepan Bobek
FW	11	Branko Zebec
Manager:
(Socialist Federal Republic of Yugoslavia) Aleksandar Tirnanić

=== Hungary vs Brazil ===
27 June 1954
17:00 CET

Hungary	4–2	Brazil
Hidegkuti 4'; Kocsis 7', 88'; Lantos 60' (pen.)		Djalma Santos 18' (pen.); Julinho 65'

Wankdorf Stadium, Bern
Attendance: 40,000
Referee: Arthur Ellis (England)

Hungary
Brazil

GK	1	Gyula Grosics
RB	2	Jenő Buzánszky
CH	3	Gyula Lóránt
LB	4	Mihály Lantos
RH	5	József Bozsik (c)	(red card) 71'
LH	6	József Zakariás
OR	7	József Tóth
IR	8	Sándor Kocsis
SS	9	Nándor Hidegkuti
IL	11	Zoltán Czibor
OL	20	Mihály Tóth
Manager:
(Hungary) Gusztáv Sebes

GK	1	Castilho
RB	2	Djalma Santos
CH	5	Pinheiro
LB	3	Nílton Santos	(red card) 71'
RH	4	Brandãozinho
LH	6	Bauer (c)
OR	7	Julinho
IR	8	Didi
CF	19	Índio
IL	18	Humberto	(red card) 79'
OL	17	Maurinho
Manager:
(Brazil) Zezé Moreira

Assistant referees:
(England) William Ling
(Switzerland) Raymon Wyssling

== Semi-finals ==
=== West Germany vs Austria ===
30 June 1954
18:00 CET

West Germany	6–1	Austria
Schäfer 31'; Morlock 47'; F. Walter 54' (pen.), 64' (pen.); O. Walter 61', 89'		Probst 51'

St. Jakob Stadium, Basel
Attendance: 58,000
Referee: Vincenzo Orlandini (Italy)

West Germany
Austria

GK	1	Toni Turek
RB	7	Josef Posipal
CH	10	Werner Liebrich
LB	3	Werner Kohlmeyer
RH	6	Horst Eckel
LH	8	Karl Mai
OR	12	Helmut Rahn
IR	13	Max Morlock
CF	15	Ottmar Walter
IL	16	Fritz Walter (c)
OL	20	Hans Schäfer
Manager:
(West Germany) Sepp Herberger

GK	16	Walter Zeman
DF	2	Gerhard Hanappi
DF	3	Ernst Happel
MF	8	Walter Schleger
MF	5	Ernst Ocwirk (c)
MF	6	Karl Koller
FW	7	Robert Körner
FW	9	Theodor Wagner
FW	21	Ernst Stojaspal
FW	10	Erich Probst
FW	11	Alfred Körner
Manager:
(Austria) Walter Nausch

=== Hungary vs Uruguay ===
30 June 1954
18:00 (CET)

Hungary	4–2 (a.e.t.)	Uruguay
Czibor 13'; Hidegkuti 46'; Kocsis 111', 116'		Hohberg 75', 86'

Stade Olympique de la Pontaise, Lausanne
Attendance: 45,000
Referee: Benjamin Griffiths (Wales)

Hungary
Uruguay

GK	1	Gyula Grosics
RB	2	Jenő Buzánszky
CH	3	Gyula Lóránt
LB	4	Mihály Lantos
RH	5	József Bozsik (c)
LH	6	József Zakariás
OR	16	László Budai
IR	8	Sándor Kocsis
CF	19	Péter Palotás
IL	9	Nándor Hidegkuti
OL	11	Zoltán Czibor
Manager:
(Hungary) Gusztáv Sebes

GK	1	Roque Máspoli
RB	4	Rodríguez Andrade
CB	2	José Santamaría
CB	3	William Martínez (c)
LWB	17	Luis Cruz
CH	16	Néstor Carballo
OR	18	Rafael Souto
IR	19	Javier Ambrois
CF	8	Juan Hohberg
IL	10	Juan Schiaffino
OL	11	Carlos Borges
Manager:
(Uruguay) Juan López

== Match for third place ==
3 July 1954
17:00 (CET)

Austria	3–1	Uruguay
Stojaspal 16' (pen.); Cruz 59' (o.g.); Ocwirk 89'		Hohberg 22'

Hardturm Stadium, Zurich
Attendance: 32,000
Referee: Raymon Wyssling (Switzerland)

Austria
Uruguay

GK	1	Kurt Schmied
DF	2	Gerhard Hanappi
DF	4	Leopold Barschandt
MF	13	Walter Kollmann
MF	5	Ernst Ocwirk (c)
MF	6	Karl Koller
FW	7	Robert Körner
FW	9	Theodor Wagner
FW	10	Erich Probst
FW	19	Robert Dienst
FW	21	Ernst Stojaspal
Manager:
(Austria) Walter Nausch

GK	1	Roque Máspoli
RB	4	Rodríguez Andrade
CB	2	José Santamaría
CB	3	William Martínez (c)
LWB	17	Luis Cruz
CH	16	Néstor Carballo
OR	7	Julio Abbadie
IR	20	Omar Méndez
CF	8	Juan Hohberg
IL	10	Juan Schiaffino
OL	11	Carlos Borges
Manager:
(Uruguay) Juan López

== Final ==
4 July 1954
17:00 CET

West Germany	3–2	Hungary
Morlock 10'; Rahn 18', 84'		Puskás 6'; Czibor 8'

Wankdorfstadion, Bern
Attendance: 62,500
Referee: William Ling (England)

West Germany	Hungary

GK	1	Toni Turek
RB	7	Josef Posipal
CB	10	Werner Liebrich
LB	3	Werner Kohlmeyer
RH	6	Horst Eckel
LH	8	Karl Mai
OR	12	Helmut Rahn
IR	13	Max Morlock
CF	15	Ottmar Walter
IL	16	Fritz Walter (c)
OL	20	Hans Schäfer
Manager:
Sepp Herberger

GK	1	Gyula Grosics
RB	2	Jenő Buzánszky
CB	3	Gyula Lóránt
LB	4	Mihály Lantos
RH	5	József Bozsik
LH	6	József Zakariás
SS	9	Nándor Hidegkuti
OR	11	Zoltán Czibor
IR	8	Sándor Kocsis
IL	10	Ferenc Puskás (c)
OL	20	Mihály Tóth
Manager:
Gusztáv Sebes

Assistant referees:
Vincenzo Orlandini (Italy)
Sandy Griffiths (Wales)

== Bibliography ==
- Sebes, Gusztáv (1955). A magyar labdarúgás (in Hungarian). Budapest: Sport Lap- és Könyvkiadó. ASIN B0018CL3XW.
