= 1948–1953 Central European International Cup =

1948–53 Central European International Cup
Tournament details
- Dates: 21 April 1948 – 13 December 1953
- Teams: 5

Final positions
- Champions: Hungary (1st title)
- Runners-up: Czechoslovakia
- Third place: Austria
- Fourth place: Italy

Tournament statistics
- Matches played: 20
- Goals scored: 82 (4.1 per match)
- Attendance: 933,500 (46,675 per match)
- Top goal scorer: (Hungary) Ferenc Puskás (10 goals)

The 1948–53 Central European International Cup was the fifth edition of the Central European International Cup played between 1948 and 1953. It was played in a round robin tournament between five teams involved in the tournament.

== Final standings ==
Pos	Team	Pld	W	D	L	GF	GA	GD	Pts	(Hungary)	(Czechoslovakia)	(Austria)	(Italy)	(Switzerland)
1	Hungary (C)	8	5	1	2	27	17	+10	11	—	2–1	6–1	1–1	7–4
2	Czechoslovakia	8	4	1	3	18	12	+6	9	5–2	—	3–1	2–0	5–0
3	Austria	8	4	1	3	15	19	−4	9	3–2	3–1	—	1–0	3–3
4	Italy	8	3	2	3	10	9	+1	8	0–3	3–0	3–1	—	2–0
5	Switzerland	8	0	3	5	12	25	−13	3	2–4	1–1	1–2	1–1	—

Source: EU-Football
(C) Champions

== Matches ==
21 April 1948
17:30 (+2:00)

Hungary	7–4	Switzerland
Puskás 1', 88'; Deák 36', 78'; Gőcze 42'; Egresi 74'; Szusza 86'	Report	Lusenti 5'; Amadò 30'; Maillard 31'; Tamini 87'

Üllői úti stadion, Budapest, Hungary
Attendance: 32,000
Referee: Karl Czerny (Austria)

2 May 1948
17:00 (+2:00)

Austria	3–2	Hungary
Melchior 20'; Wagner 67' (pen.); Körner 84'	Report	Szusza 15'; Deák 48'

Praterstadion, Vienna, Austria
Attendance: 57,000
Referee: Jaroslav Vlček (Czechoslovakia)

23 May 1948
18:00 (+2:00)

Hungary	2–1	Czechoslovakia
Egresi 16'; Deák 73'	Report	Schubert 81'

Üllői úti stadion, Budapest, Hungary
Attendance: 32,000
Referee: Marijan Matančić (Yugoslavia)

This match between Hungary and Czechoslovakia also counted for the 1948 Balkan Cup.

10 October 1948
15:00 (+1:00)

Switzerland	1–1	Czechoslovakia
Friedländer 25'	Report	Cejp 66'

Stadion Rankhof, Basel, Switzerland
Attendance: 22,000
Referee: Giuseppe Carpani (Italy)

31 October 1948
14:30 (+1:00)

Czechoslovakia	3–1	Austria
Hemele 55', 66'; Hlaváček 85'	Report	Stroh 15'

Tehelné pole, Bratislava, Czechoslovakia
Attendance: 31,500
Referee: Árpád Kamarás (Hungary)

3 April 1949
15:00 (UTC+1:00)

Switzerland	1–2	Austria
Bickel 88'	Report	Habitzl 15', 81'

Stade olympique de la Pontaise, Lausanne, Switzerland
Attendance: 32,000
Referee: Victor Sdez (France)

10 April 1949
17:30 (UTC+2:00)

Czechoslovakia	5–2	Hungary
Preis 43'; Šimanský 56'; Hlaváček 63', 66'; Pažický 71'	Report	Puskás 61'; Szusza 78'

Stadion Československé Armády, Strahov (Prague), Czechoslovakia
Attendance: 55,000
Referee: Maksymilian Schneider (Poland)

8 May 1949
17:30 (UTC+2:00)

Hungary	6–1	Austria
Deák 2', 49'; Kocsis 22'; Puskás 32', 82' (pen.), 89'	Report	Melchior 82'

Megyeri úti Stadion, Újpest, Hungary
Attendance: 50,000
Referee: Jaroslav Vlček (Czechoslovakia)

22 May 1949
16:30 (UTC+1:00)

Italy	3–1	Austria
Cappello 26'; Amadei 42'; Boniperti 43'	Report	Huber 70'

Stadio Comunale, Florence, Italy
Attendance: 85,000
Referee: Jean Lutz (Switzerland)

12 June 1949
18:00 (UTC+2:00)

Hungary	1–1	Italy
Deák 29'	Report	Carapellese 11'

Megyeri úti Stadion, Újpest, Hungary
Attendance: 45,000
Referee: Bill Evans (England)

25 September 1949
16:00 (UTC+1:00)

Austria	3–1	Czechoslovakia
Decker 33', 82' (pen.); Huber 67'	Report	Šimanský 52'

Praterstadion, Vienna, Austria
Attendance: 60,000
Referee: Giuseppe Carpani (Italy)

19 March 1950
16:00 (UTC+1:00)

Austria	3–3	Switzerland
Ocwirk 11'; Körner 14'; Decker 32' (pen.)	Report	Fatton 41'; Tamini 51'; Oberer 86'

Praterstadion, Vienna, Austria
Attendance: 62,000
Referee: Giovanni Galeati (Italy)

2 April 1950
16:30 (UTC+1:00)

Austria	1–0	Italy
Melchior 52'	Report

Praterstadion, Vienna, Austria
Attendance: 63,000
Referee: Henry Pearce (England)

25 November 1951
14:30 (UTC+1:00)

Switzerland	1–1	Italy
Riva 15'	Report	Boniperti 84'

Cornaredo Stadium, Lugano, Switzerland
Attendance: 32,000
Referee: William Ling (England)

20 September 1952
14:30 (UTC+1:00)

Switzerland	2–4	Hungary
Hügi 15'; Fatton 36'	Report	Puskás 36', 45'; Kocsis 56'; Hidegkuti 74'

Wankdorf Stadium, Bern, Switzerland
Attendance: 30,000
Referee: Arthur Ellis (England)

28 December 1952
14:30 (UTC+1:00)

Italy	2–0	Austria
Pandolfini 3' (pen.); Frignani 72'	Report

Stadio La Favorita, Palermo, Italy
Attendance: 32,000
Referee: Laurent Franken (Belgium)

26 April 1953
16:00 (UTC+1:00)

Czechoslovakia	2–0	Italy
Pažický 79', 81'	Report

Letenský Stadion, Prague, Czechoslovakia
Attendance: 35,000
Referee: Laurent Franken (Belgium)

17 May 1953
16:15 (UTC+1:00)

Italy	0–3	Hungary
	Report	Hidegkuti 41'; Puskás 63', 68'

Stadio Olimpico, Rome, Italy
Attendance: 80,000
Referee: Bill Evans (England)

20 September 1953
16:00 (UTC+1:00)

Czechoslovakia	5–0	Switzerland
Pažický 38'; Trnka 59', 63'; Kraus 75'; Hertl 86'	Report

Stadion Československé Armády, Strahov (Prague), Czechoslovakia
Attendance: 48,000
Referee: Karel van der Meer (Netherlands)

13 December 1953
15:00 (UTC+1:00)

Italy	3–0	Czechoslovakia
Cervato 23'; Ricagni 27'; Pandolfini 47' (pen.)	Report

Stadio Comunale Luigi Ferraris, Genoa, Italy
Attendance: 50,000
Referee: Henri Bauwens (Belgium)

== Winner ==
1948–53 Central European International Cup

Hungary
first title

== Statistics ==
=== Goalscorers ===
There were 82 goals scored in 20 matches, for an average of 4.1 goals per match.

10 goals

- (Hungary) Ferenc Puskás

7 goals

- (Hungary) Ferenc Deák

4 goals

- (Czechoslovakia) Emil Pažický

3 goals

- (Austria) Ernst Melchior
- (Austria) Karl Decker
- (Hungary) Ferenc Szusza
- (Czechoslovakia) Ladislav Hlaváček

2 goals

- (Austria) Adolf Huber
- (Austria) Erich Habitzl
- (Hungary) Béla Egresi
- (Hungary) Nándor Hidegkuti
- (Hungary) Sándor Kocsis
- (Italy) Egisto Pandolfini
- (Italy) Giampiero Boniperti
- (Switzerland) Jacques Fatton
- (Switzerland) Jean Tamini
- (Czechoslovakia) Gejza Šimanský
- (Czechoslovakia) Jiří Trnka
- (Czechoslovakia) Otto Hemele

1 goal

- (Austria) Alfred Körner
- (Austria) Ernst Ocwirk
- (Austria) Josef Stroh
- (Austria) Robert Körner
- (Austria) Theodor Wagner
- (Hungary) Sándor Gőcze
- (Italy) Amedeo Amadei
- (Italy) Amleto Frignani
- (Italy) Eduardo Ricagni
- (Italy) Gino Cappello
- (Italy) Riccardo Carapellese
- (Italy) Sergio Cervato
- (Switzerland) Lauro Amadò
- (Switzerland) Alfred Bickel
- (Switzerland) Ferdinando Riva
- (Switzerland) Josef Hügi
- (Switzerland) Gerhard Lusenti
- (Switzerland) Hans-Peter Friedländer
- (Switzerland) René Maillard
- (Switzerland) Traugott Oberer
- (Czechoslovakia) Jan Hertl
- (Czechoslovakia) Jaroslav Cejp
- (Czechoslovakia) Julius Schubert
- (Czechoslovakia) Tadeáš Kraus
- (Czechoslovakia) Vlastimil Preis

== See also ==
Balkan Cup
Baltic Cup
Nordic Cup
Mediterranean Cup
