= List of FIFA World Cup hat-tricks =

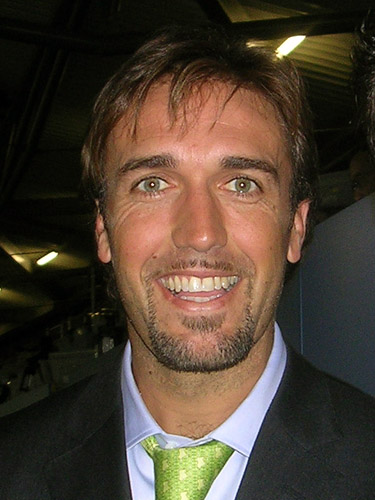
Gabriel Batistuta of Argentina is the only player to score a hat-trick at two World Cups.

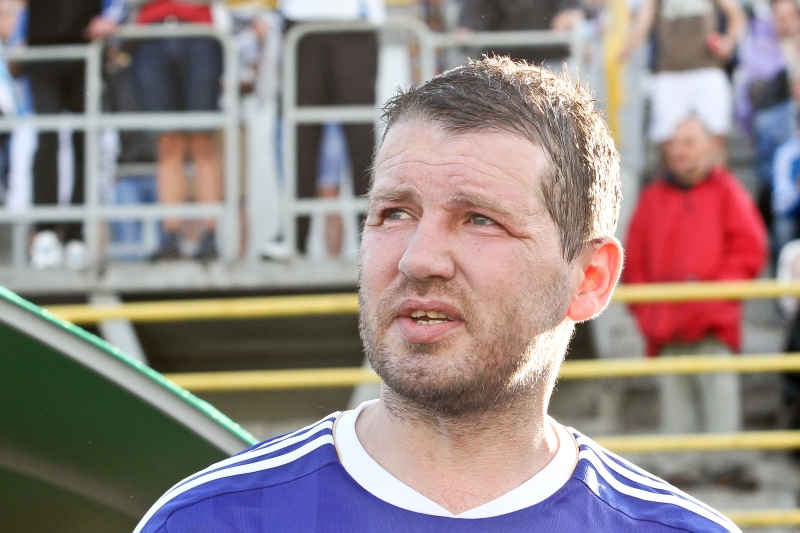
Oleg Salenko of Russia scored a record five goals in a match against Cameroon at the 1994 World Cup.

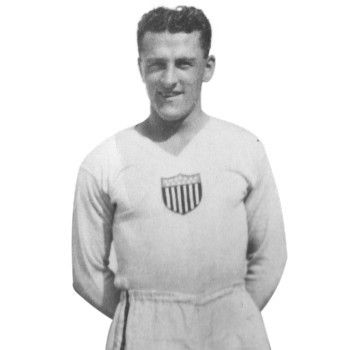
Bert Patenaude of the United States scored the first hat-trick in tournament history in a match against Paraguay at the 1930 FIFA World Cup.

The FIFA World Cup is an international association football competition established in 1930. It is contested by the men's national teams of the members of the FIFA, the sport's global governing body. The tournament has taken place organised every four years, except in 1942 and 1946, when the competition was cancelled due to World War II. A hat-trick occurs when a player scores three or more goals in a single match and it is considered an achievement, especially while playing at the largest international football tournament in the world. Across the over 1,000 matches at the 23 tournaments of the FIFA World Cup, 58 hat-tricks have been scored. The first hat-trick was scored by Bert Patenaude of the United States, playing against Paraguay in 1930; the most recent was by Bukayo Saka of England, playing against France on 18 July 2026. The only World Cup not to have at least one hat-trick scored was the 2006 FIFA World Cup in Germany. The record number of hat-tricks in a single World Cup tournament is eight, during the 1954 FIFA World Cup in Switzerland.

Only four players have scored more than one hat-trick at the FIFA World Cup: Sándor Kocsis (two in 1954), Just Fontaine (two in 1958), Gerd Müller (two in 1970) and Gabriel Batistuta (1994 and 1998) — the latter being the only player in history to score hat-tricks at two World Cups. 20 players have scored a hat-trick in the knockout stage of the FIFA World Cup. Two were playing in their first ever World Cup match, Edmund Conen and Angelo Schiavio, both in 1934, a tournament without a group stage. Geoff Hurst (1966) and Kylian Mbappé (2022), who also scored 2 penalties, are the only players to have scored a hat-trick in the final. Two players have scored a hat-trick in the second group stage of the World Cup, Paolo Rossi and Zbigniew Boniek, both in 1982.

== List ==
Key
Player (X)	Number of times player scored a hat-trick (only for players with multiple hat-tricks)
	Player's team lost the match
	Player's team drew the match (a penalty shoot-out is recorded as a draw regardless of shoot-out results)

FIFA World Cup hat-tricks
No.	Tournament	Player	Number and time of goals	For	Goals	Result	Against	Round	Date	FIFA report
1.	1930, Uruguay	Bert Patenaude	3 – 10', 15', 50'	United States	1–0, 2–0, 3–0	3–0	Paraguay	Group stage	17 July 1930	
2.	1930, Uruguay	Guillermo Stábile	3 – 8', 17', 80'	Argentina	1–0, 3–0, 6–3	6–3	Mexico	Group stage	19 July 1930	
3.	1930, Uruguay	Pedro Cea	3 – 18', 67', 72'	Uruguay	1–1, 5–1, 6–1	6–1	Yugoslavia	Semi-finals	27 July 1930	
4.	1934, Italy	Angelo Schiavio	3 – 18', 29', 64'	Italy	1–0, 3–0, 5–1	7–1	United States	Round of 16	27 May 1934	
5.	1934, Italy	Edmund Conen	3 – 66', 70', 87'	Germany	3–2, 4–2, 5–2	5–2	Belgium	Round of 16	27 May 1934	
6.	1934, Italy	Oldřich Nejedlý	3 – 19', 71', 80'	Czechoslovakia	1–0, 2–1, 3–1	3–1	Germany	Semi-finals	3 June 1934	
7.	1938, France	Ernst Wilimowski	4 – 53', 59', 89', 118'	Poland	2–3, 3–3, 4–4, 5–6	5–6 aet	Brazil	Round of 16	5 June 1938	
8.	1938, France	Leônidas	3 – 18', 93', 104'	Brazil	1–0, 5–4, 6–4	6–5 aet	Poland	Round of 16	5 June 1938	
9.	1938, France	Gustav Wetterström	3 – 32', 37', 44'	Sweden	2–0, 3–0, 4–0	8–0	Cuba	Quarter-finals	12 June 1938	
10.	1938, France	Harry Andersson	3 – 9', 81', 89'	Sweden	1–0, 6–0, 8–0	8–0	Cuba	Quarter-finals	12 June 1938	
11.	1950, Brazil	Óscar Míguez	3 – 14', 45', 56'	Uruguay	1–0, 4–0, 5–0	8–0	Bolivia	First group stage	2 July 1950	
12.	1950, Brazil	Ademir	4 – 17', 36', 52', 58'	Brazil	1–0, 2–0, 4–0, 5–0	7–1	Sweden	Final group stage	9 July 1950	
13.	1954, Switzerland	Sándor Kocsis (1)	3 – 24', 36', 50'	Hungary	3–0, 4–0, 5–0	9–0	South Korea	Group stage	17 June 1954	
14.	1954, Switzerland	Erich Probst	3 – 4', 21', 24'	Austria	2–0, 3–0, 4–0	5–0	Czechoslovakia	Group stage	19 June 1954	
15.	1954, Switzerland	Carlos Borges	3 – 17', 47', 57'	Uruguay	1–0, 3–0, 5–0	7–0	Scotland	Group stage	19 June 1954	
16.	1954, Switzerland	Sándor Kocsis (2)	4 – 3', 21', 67', 78'	Hungary	1–0, 3–0, 6–1, 8–2	8–3	West Germany	Group stage	20 June 1954	
17.	1954, Switzerland	Burhan Sargın	3 – 37', 64', 70'	Turkey	4–0, 5–0, 6–0	7–0	South Korea	Group stage	20 June 1954	
18.	1954, Switzerland	Max Morlock	3 – 30', 60', 77'	West Germany	3–1, 4–1, 6–1	7–2	Turkey	Group stage	23 June 1954	
19.	1954, Switzerland	Theodor Wagner	3 – 25', 27', 53'	Austria	1–3, 3–3, 6–4	7–5	Switzerland	Quarter-finals	26 June 1954	
20.	1954, Switzerland	Josef Hügi	3 – 17', 19', 58'	Switzerland	2–0, 3–0, 5–6	5–7	Austria	Quarter-finals	26 June 1954	
21.	1958, Sweden	Just Fontaine (1)	3 – 24', 30', 67'	France	1–1, 2–1, 5–3	7–3	Paraguay	Group stage	8 June 1958	
22.	1958, Sweden	Pelé	3 – 52', 64', 75'	Brazil	3–1, 4–1, 5–1	5–2	France	Semi-finals	24 June 1958	
23.	1958, Sweden	Just Fontaine (2)	4 – 16', 36', 78', 89'	France	1–0, 3–1, 4–1, 6–3	6–3	West Germany	Match for third place	28 June 1958	
24.	1962, Chile	Flórián Albert	3 – 1', 6', 53'	Hungary	1–0, 2–0, 5–0	6–1	Bulgaria	Group stage	3 June 1962	
25.	1966, England	Eusébio	4 – 27', 43' (p), 56', 59' (p)	Portugal	1–3, 2–3, 3–3, 4–3	5–3	North Korea	Quarter-finals	23 July 1966	
26.	1966, England	Geoff Hurst	3 – 18', 98', 120'	England	1–1, 3–2, 4–2	4–2 aet	West Germany	Final	30 July 1966	
27.	1970, Mexico	Gerd Müller (1)	3 – 27', 52' (p), 88'	West Germany	2–1, 3–1, 5–1	5–2	Bulgaria	Group stage	7 June 1970	
28.	1970, Mexico	Gerd Müller (2)	3 – 19', 26', 39'	West Germany	1–0, 2–0, 3–0	3–1	Peru	Group stage	10 June 1970	
29.	1974, West Germany	Dušan Bajević	3 – 8', 30', 81'	Yugoslavia	1–0, 5–0, 9–0	9–0	Zaire	First group stage	18 June 1974	
30.	1974, West Germany	Andrzej Szarmach	3 – 30', 34', 50'	Poland	3–0, 5–0, 6–0	7–0	Haiti	First group stage	19 June 1974	
31.	1978, Argentina	Rob Rensenbrink	3 – 40' (p), 62', 79' (p)	Netherlands	1–0, 2–0, 3–0	3–0	Iran	First group stage	3 June 1978	
32.	1978, Argentina	Teófilo Cubillas	3 – 36' (p), 39' (p), 79'	Peru	2–0, 3–0, 4–1	4–1	Iran	First group stage	11 June 1978	
33.	1982, Spain	László Kiss	3 – 69', 72', 76'	Hungary	6–1, 8–1, 9–1	10–1	El Salvador	First group stage	15 June 1982	
34.	1982, Spain	Karl-Heinz Rummenigge	3 – 9', 57', 66'	West Germany	1–0, 2–0, 3–0	4–1	Chile	First group stage	20 June 1982	
35.	1982, Spain	Zbigniew Boniek	3 – 4', 26', 53'	Poland	1–0, 2–0, 3–0	3–0	Belgium	Second group stage	28 June 1982	
36.	1982, Spain	Paolo Rossi	3 – 5', 25', 74'	Italy	1–0, 2–1, 3–2	3–2	Brazil	Second group stage	5 July 1982	
37.	1986, Mexico	Preben Elkjær	3 – 11', 67', 80'	Denmark	1–0, 4–1, 5–1	6–1	Uruguay	Group stage	8 June 1986	
38.	1986, Mexico	Gary Lineker	3 – 9', 14', 34'	England	1–0, 2–0, 3–0	3–0	Poland	Group stage	11 June 1986	
39.	1986, Mexico	Igor Belanov	3 – 27', 70', 111' (p)	Soviet Union	1–0, 2–1, 3–4	3–4 aet	Belgium	Round of 16	15 June 1986	
40.	1986, Mexico	Emilio Butragueño	4 – 43', 56', 80', 88' (p)	Spain	1–1, 2–1, 4–1, 5–1	5–1	Denmark	Round of 16	18 June 1986	
41.	1990, Italy	Míchel	3 – 22', 61', 81'	Spain	1–0, 2–1, 3–1	3–1	South Korea	Group stage	17 June 1990	
42.	1990, Italy	Tomáš Skuhravý	3 – 12', 63', 82'	Czechoslovakia	1–0, 2–1, 4–1	4–1	Costa Rica	Round of 16	23 June 1990	
43.	1994, United States	Gabriel Batistuta (1)	3 – 2', 44', 89' (p)	Argentina	1–0, 2–0, 4–0	4–0	Greece	Group stage	21 June 1994	
44.	1994, United States	Oleg Salenko	5 – 14', 41', 44' (p), 72', 75'	Russia	1–0, 2–0, 3–0, 4–1, 5–1	6–1	Cameroon	Group stage	28 June 1994	
45.	1998, France	Gabriel Batistuta (2)	3 – 73', 78', 83' (p)	Argentina	3–0, 4–0, 5–0	5–0	Jamaica	Group stage	21 June 1998	
46.	2002, South Korea & Japan	Miroslav Klose	3 – 20', 25', 70'	Germany	1–0, 2–0, 5–0	8–0	Saudi Arabia	Group stage	1 June 2002	
47.	2002, South Korea & Japan	Pauleta	3 – 14', 65', 77'	Portugal	1–0, 2–0, 3–0	4–0	Poland	Group stage	10 June 2002	
48.	2010, South Africa	Gonzalo Higuaín	3 – 33', 76', 80'	Argentina	2–0, 3–1, 4–1	4–1	South Korea	Group stage	17 June 2010	
49.	2014, Brazil	Thomas Müller	3 – 12' (p), 45', 78'	Germany	1–0, 3–0, 4–0	4–0	Portugal	Group stage	16 June 2014	
50.	2014, Brazil	Xherdan Shaqiri	3 – 6', 31', 71'	Switzerland	1–0, 2–0, 3–0	3–0	Honduras	Group stage	25 June 2014	
51.	2018, Russia	Cristiano Ronaldo	3 – 4' (p), 44', 88'	Portugal	1–0, 2–1, 3–3	3–3	Spain	Group stage	15 June 2018	
52.	2018, Russia	Harry Kane	3 – 22' (p), 45+1' (p), 62'	England	2–0, 5–0, 6–0	6–1	Panama	Group stage	24 June 2018	
53.	2022, Qatar	Gonçalo Ramos	3 – 17', 51', 67'	Portugal	1–0, 3–0, 5–1	6–1	Switzerland	Round of 16	6 December 2022	
54.	2022, Qatar	Kylian Mbappé	3 – 80' (p), 81', 118' (p)	France	1–2, 2–2, 3–3	3–3 aet	Argentina	Final	18 December 2022	
55.	2026, Canada, Mexico & United States	Lionel Messi	3 – 17', 60', 76'	Argentina	1–0, 2–0, 3–0	3–0	Algeria	Group stage	16 June 2026	
56.	2026, Canada, Mexico & United States	Jonathan David	3 – 29', 45+3', 90+2'	Canada	2–0, 3–0, 6–0	6–0	Qatar	Group stage	18 June 2026	
57.	2026, Canada, Mexico & United States	Ousmane Dembélé	3 – 7', 20', 32'	France	1–0, 2–0, 3–1	4–1	Norway	Group stage	26 June 2026	
58.	2026, Canada, Mexico & United States	Bukayo Saka	3 – 37', 45+1', 87' (p)	England	3–0, 4–0, 5–3 (p)	6–4	France	Match for third place	18 July 2026	

== Notable World Cup hat-tricks ==
- Bert Patenaude was the first player to score a hat-trick in a World Cup match, on 17 July 1930 against Paraguay. However, until 10 November 2006 the first hat-trick that FIFA acknowledged had been scored by Guillermo Stábile of Argentina, two days after Patenaude. In 2006, FIFA announced that Patenaude's claim to being the first hat-trick scorer was valid, as teammate Tom Florie's goal in the match against Paraguay was re-attributed to him.
- Four players have scored two hat-tricks in World Cup matches: Sándor Kocsis (both 1954); Just Fontaine (both 1958); Gerd Müller (both 1970); and Gabriel Batistuta (1994 and 1998). Batistuta is thus the only person to score hat-tricks in two World Cups. He has another unique record of scoring hat-tricks, both were achieved on 21 June of the year, against World Cup finals debutants (Greece and Jamaica), and each time the third goal was a penalty. Kocsis and Müller scored their hat-tricks in consecutive matches.
- Oleg Salenko is the only player in World Cup history to have scored five goals in a single match. He did this during the 1994 FIFA World Cup match between Russia and Cameroon.
- One player has scored a hat-trick on his international début: Guillermo Stábile (1930).
- One player has scored four goals for the losing side: Ernst Wilimowski (5–6, 1938).
- Two players have scored a hat-trick for the losing side: Josef Hügi (5–7, 1954) and Igor Belanov (3–4, 1986).
- Two other players have scored a hat-trick in a game that their side did not win: Cristiano Ronaldo (3–3, 2018) and Kylian Mbappé (3–3, losing 4–2 on penalties, 2022).
- There have been three occasions when two hat-tricks have been scored in the same match. Two occurred during the 1938 FIFA World Cup: when Sweden defeated Cuba, Gustav Wetterström and Harry Andersson, both playing for Sweden, scored three goals, with the former completing his in the first half. In the Brazil vs Poland, Leônidas did it for Brazil and Ernst Wilimowski for Poland. One occurred in 1954: when Austria defeated Switzerland, Theodor Wagner and Josef Hügi scored hat-tricks for Austria and Switzerland respectively.
- Two players have scored hat-tricks in World Cup Finals. Geoff Hurst scored three goals for England against West Germany in the 1966 final. This is also the longest hat-trick to be completed — most time between the first and third goals. His first goal came at 18', while the second and third goals were in extra time at 98' and 120'. Kylian Mbappé scored the other World Cup finals' hat-trick in the 2022 FIFA World Cup final for France against Argentina. His goals were scored at the 80th, 81st and 118th minute marks. Two of his goals - 80th and 118th - were successful penalty kicks.
- The quickest hat-trick by a player is Erich Probst, who scored at 4', 21', and 24' in 1954, playing for Austria against Czechoslovakia in the first round.
- The briefest hat-trick to be completed — that is, the shortest time between the first and third goals — is the one by László Kiss in 1982 against El Salvador. He scored at 69', 72', and 76', making the time between his first and third 7 minutes. This is also the only hat-trick scored by a substitute.
- The only players to have scored from three headers in a single match are Tomáš Skuhravý in 1990 and Miroslav Klose in 2002.
- The youngest player to score a hat-trick is Pelé, at 17 years, 244 days (5–2 against France in 1958).
- The oldest player to score a hat-trick is Lionel Messi, at 38 years, 357 days (3–0 against Algeria in 2026).
- Germany (incl. West Germany) holds the record for most hat-tricks scored with 7. Germany also shares with South Korea the record for most hat-tricks conceded with 4.

== See also ==
- FIFA World Cup records and statistics
- FIFA World Cup
