= List of FIFA World Cup opening matches =

The FIFA World Cup is an international association football competition established in 1930. It is contested by the men's national teams of the members of Fédération Internationale de Football Association (FIFA), the sport's global governing body. The tournament has taken place every four years, except in 1942 and 1946, when the competition was cancelled due to World War II.

The World Cup opening match is the first of the competition. Opening match regulations have changed many times. Between 1974 and 2002, the defending champions were involved in the opening match. Since 2006, as the defending champions no longer qualify automatically, the opening matches involve the host nations.

== List of opening matches ==
=== Early years (1930–1970) ===
Year	Team 1	Final score	Team 2	Venue	Location	Attendance	References	Notes
1930	France	4–1	Mexico	Estadio Pocitos	Montevideo, Uruguay	4,444	Report	Two matches both played at the same time
1930	United States	3–0	Belgium	Estadio Parque Central	Montevideo, Uruguay	18,346	Report	Two matches both played at the same time
1934	Italy	7–1	United States	Stadio Nazionale PNF	Rome, Italy	25,000	Report	Eight matches were played at the same time
1934	Spain	3–1	Brazil	Stadio Luigi Ferraris	Genoa, Italy	21,000	Report	Eight matches were played at the same time
1934	Austria	3–2	France	Stadio Benito Mussolini	Turin, Italy	16,000	Report	Eight matches were played at the same time
1934	Hungary	4–2	Egypt	Stadio Giorgio Ascarelli	Naples, Italy	9,000	Report	Eight matches were played at the same time
1934	Czechoslovakia	2–1	Romania	Stadio Littorio	Trieste, Italy	9,000	Report	Eight matches were played at the same time
1934	Switzerland	3–2	Netherlands	Stadio San Siro	Milan, Italy	33,000	Report	Eight matches were played at the same time
1934	Germany	5–2	Belgium	Stadio Giovanni Berta	Florence, Italy	8,000	Report	Eight matches were played at the same time
1934	Sweden	3–2	Argentina	Stadio Littoriale	Bologna, Italy	14,000	Report	Eight matches were played at the same time
1938	Switzerland	1–1	Germany	Parc des Princes	Paris, France	27,152	Report	First opening match to end in a draw
1950	Brazil	4–0	Mexico	Maracanã Stadium	Rio de Janeiro, Brazil	81,649	Report	Brazil was the host country
1954	Brazil	5–0	Mexico	Charmilles Stadium	Geneva, Switzerland	13,470	Report	Four matches were played at the same time
1954	Yugoslavia	1–0	France	Stade Olympique de la Pontaise	Lausanne, Switzerland	16,000	Report	Four matches were played at the same time
1954	Uruguay	2–0	Czechoslovakia	Wankdorf Stadium	Bern, Switzerland	20,500	Report	Four matches were played at the same time
1954	Austria	1–0	Scotland	Hardturm Stadium	Zürich, Switzerland	25,000	Report	Four matches were played at the same time
1958	Sweden	3–0	Mexico	Råsunda Stadium	Solna, Sweden	34,107	Report	Sweden was the host country
1962	Uruguay	2–1	Colombia	Estadio Carlos Dittborn	Arica, Chile	7,908	Report	Four matches were played at the same time
1962	Chile	3–1	Switzerland	Estadio Nacional	Santiago, Chile	65,006	Report	Four matches were played at the same time
1962	Brazil	2–0	Mexico	Estadio Sausalito	Viña del Mar, Chile	10,484	Report	Four matches were played at the same time
1962	Argentina	1–0	Bulgaria	Estadio El Teniente	Rancagua, Chile	7,134	Report	Four matches were played at the same time
1966	England	0–0	Uruguay	Wembley Stadium	London, England	87,148	Report	England was the host country
1970	Mexico	0–0	Soviet Union	Estadio Azteca	Mexico City, Mexico	107,160	Report	Mexico was the host country

=== Defending champion era (1974–2002) ===
Year	Defending champion	Final score	Opponent	Venue	Location	Attendance	References	Notes
1974	Brazil	0–0	Yugoslavia	Waldstadion	Frankfurt, West Germany	62,000	Report	
1978	West Germany	0–0	Poland	Estadio Monumental	Buenos Aires, Argentina	67,579	Report	
1982	Argentina	0–1	Belgium	Camp Nou	Barcelona, Spain	95,000	Report	
1986	Italy	1–1	Bulgaria	Estadio Azteca	Mexico City, Mexico	96,000	Report	
1990	Argentina	0–1	Cameroon	San Siro	Milan, Italy	73,780	Report	
1994	Germany	1–0	Bolivia	Soldier Field	Chicago, United States	63,117	Report	
1998	Brazil	2–1	Scotland	Stade de France	Saint-Denis, France	80,000	Report	
2002	France	0–1	Senegal	Seoul World Cup Stadium	Seoul, South Korea	62,561	Report	

=== Host country era (2006–) ===
Year	Host country	Final score	Opponent	Venue	Location	Attendance	References	Notes
2006	Germany	4–2	Costa Rica	Allianz Arena	Munich, Germany	66,000	Report	
2010	South Africa	1–1	Mexico	Soccer City	Johannesburg, South Africa	84,490	Report	
2014	Brazil	3–1	Croatia	Arena Corinthians	São Paulo, Brazil	62,103	Report	
2018	Russia	5–0	Saudi Arabia	Luzhniki Stadium	Moscow, Russia	78,011	Report	
2022	Qatar	0–2	Ecuador	Al Bayt Stadium	Al Khor, Qatar	67,372	Report	
2026 (Note: The 2026 World Cup is being co-hosted by Canada, Mexico, and the United States. Mexico's opening game on June 11 was the first match of the tournament. Canada and the United States played their first matches on June 12.)	Mexico	2–0	South Africa	Estadio Azteca	Mexico City, Mexico	80,824	Report	

== See also ==
- List of FIFA World Cup finals
- List of FIFA Confederations Cup finals
- List of association football competitions
- List of nicknamed FIFA World Cup matches
