= 1963–64 Beşiktaş J.K. season =

Beşiktaş J.K.
1963–64 season
- President: (Turkey) Selahattin Akel
- Manager: (Austria) Ernst Melchior
- Turkish First Football League: 2nd
- Balkans Cup: Group Stage (eliminated)

The 1963–64 season was Beşiktaş J.K.'s 45th official season, their 6th year in the Turkish First Football League and their 61st year in existence. They finished 2nd in the Turkish First Football League behind Fenerbahçe by a single point. They also competed in the Balkans Cup for the first time but were eliminated in the group stage.

== First League ==
Pos	Team	Pld	W	D	L	GF	GA	GR	Pts	Qualification or relegation
1	Fenerbahçe (C)	34	21	11	2	55	14	3.929	53	Qualification to European Cup preliminary round
2	Beşiktaş	34	22	8	4	57	19	3.000	52	Invitation to Balkans Cup
3	Galatasaray	34	16	10	8	49	27	1.815	42	Qualification to Cup Winners' Cup first round
4	MKE Ankaragücü	34	17	8	9	52	38	1.368	42	
5	Göztepe	34	14	12	8	39	31	1.258	40	Invitation to Inter-Cities Fairs Cup first round

Rules for classification: Tiebreaker is the goal ratio (average of goals scored to goals allowed)
(C) Champions

== Balkans Cup ==
Beşiktaş took part in their first Balkans Cup tournament, but were eliminated in the group stage.

=== Group stage ===
Pos	Team	Pld	W	D	L	GF	GA	GR	Pts	Qualification
1	(Romania) Rapid București (A)	6	4	2	0	9	2	4.500	10	Advances to finals
2	(Bulgaria) Levski Sofia	6	1	3	2	7	6	1.167	5	
3	(Albania) Dinamo Tirana	6	1	3	2	6	6	1.000	5	
4	(Turkey) Beşiktaş	6	1	2	3	2	10	0.200	4	

Source: rsssf.com
Rules for classification: 1) points; 2) goal average; 3) number of goals scored
(A) Advance to a further round

August 30, 1963	Beşiktaş (Turkey)	1–0	(Albania) Dinamo Tirana	Istanbul, Turkey
				Stadium: BJK İnönü Stadium

September 4, 1963	Beşiktaş (Turkey)	0–0	(Romania) Rapid Bucharest	Istanbul, Turkey
				Stadium: BJK İnönü Stadium

October 16, 1963	Dinamo Tirana (Albania)	2–0	(Turkey) Beşiktaş	Tirana, Albania
				Stadium: Qemal Stafa Stadium

October 17, 1963	Rapid Bucharest (Romania)	3–0	(Turkey) Beşiktaş	Bucharest, Romania
				Stadium: Giulești-Valentin Stănescu

November 6, 1963	Beşiktaş (Turkey)	1–1	(Bulgaria) Levski Sofia	Istanbul, Turkey
				Stadium: BJK İnönü Stadium

August 7, 1964	Levski Sofia (Bulgaria)	4–0	(Turkey) Beşiktaş	Sofia, Bulgaria
				Stadium: Georgi Asparuhov Stadium
