= 1947–48 Czechoslovak First League =

Czechoslovak First League
- Season: 1947–48
- Dates: 24 August 1947 – 27 June 1948
- Champions: Sparta Prague
- Relegated: SK České Budějovice; Čechie Karlín
- Top goalscorer: Josef Bican and Jaroslav Cejp (21 goals)

Statistics of Czechoslovak First League in the 1947–48 season.

== Overview ==
It was contested by 11 teams, and Sparta Prague won the championship. Jaroslav Cejp was the league's top scorer with 21 goals.

== Stadia and locations ==
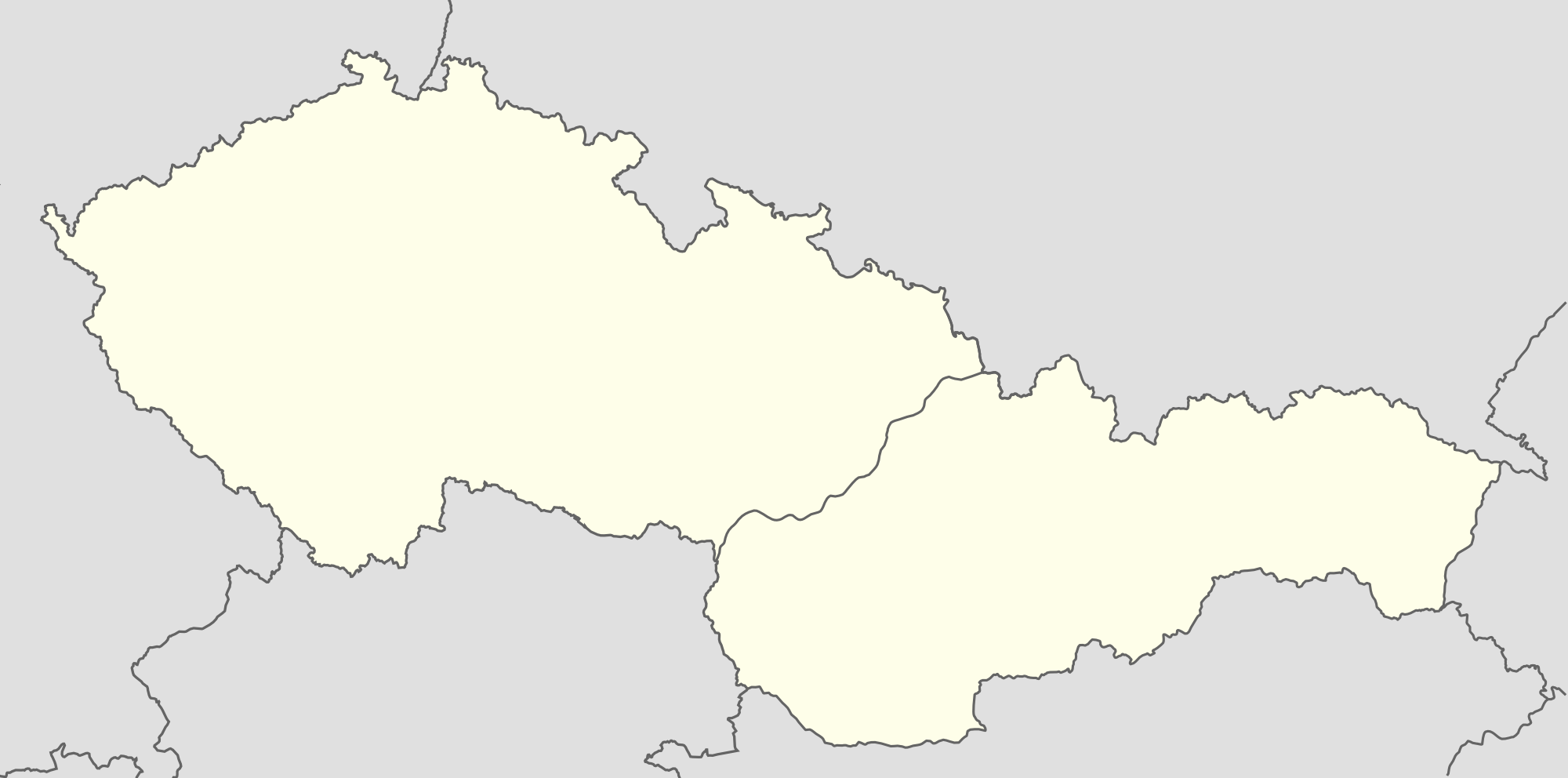
Location of clubs in the 1947–48 Czechoslovak First League

== League standings ==
Pos	Team	Pld	W	D	L	GF	GA	GR	Pts
1	Sparta Prague (C)	20	12	3	5	62	35	1.771	27
2	Slavia Prague	20	11	5	4	64	39	1.641	27
3	ŠK Bratislava	20	10	4	6	57	31	1.839	24
4	Bohemians Vršovice	20	10	4	6	56	46	1.217	24
5	TSS Trnava	20	9	3	8	38	40	0.950	21
6	Jednota Košice	20	7	6	7	46	39	1.179	20
7	Slezská Ostrava	20	7	5	8	48	56	0.857	19
8	Viktoria Plzeň	20	8	1	11	48	56	0.857	17
9	MŠK Žilina	20	6	4	10	36	56	0.643	16
10	České Budějovice (R)	20	4	5	11	42	80	0.525	13
11	Čechie Karlín (R)	20	5	2	13	43	62	0.694	12

Source: rsssf.com
(C) Champions; (R) Relegated

== Results ==
Home \ Away	BOH	KAR	ČBU	KOŠ	ŽIL	SKB	SLA	OST	SPA	TRN	PLZ
Bohemians Vršovice		2–4	4–3	4–3	2–2	5–0	3–2	3–3	3–2	2–3	3–0
Čechie Karlín	1–1		1–0	2–2	2–4	1–3	5–6	2–6	2–3	4–1	3–2
České Budějovice	6–5	1–3		5–3	3–2	2–5	1–1	2–2	0–4	2–2	4–3
Jednota Košice	1–1	6–3	4–2		5–2	2–0	4–1	4–2	1–2	1–0	3–3
MŠK Žilina	2–4	1–0	4–4	2–2		0–3	0–1	3–0	2–7	0–0	3–2
ŠK Bratislava	2–3	5–2	6–0	1–1	5–2		1–2	6–1	0–1	4–1	7–1
Slavia Prague	2–3	4–1	15–1	2–2	5–0	2–2		2–1	3–0	3–2	4–2
Slezská Ostrava	3–2	4–2	2–2	3–2	4–0	1–1	3–4		4–4	3–1	2–0
Sparta Prague	3–1	6–2	4–1	2–0	4–0	2–2	1–1	8–4		1–3	7–0
TSS Trnava	2–1	3–2	4–1	1–0	0–3	0–3	3–3	5–0	1–0		5–2
Viktoria Plzeň	2–4	2–1	6–2	1–0	3–4	2–1	4–1	3–0	5–1	5–1	

Source: statistiky1ligy.fotbal.cz
Legend: Blue = home team win; Yellow = draw; Red = away team win.
