= Jaroslav Cejp =

Czechoslovak footballer

Personal information
- Full name: Jaroslav Cejp
- Date of birth: 7 April 1924
- Place of birth: Carpathian Ruthenia, Czechoslovakia
- Date of death: 22 March 2002 (aged 77)
- Position: Forward

Senior career*
Years	Team	Apps	(Gls)
1943–1946	Pardubice		
1946–1951	Sparta Prague		

International career
1946–1951	Czechoslovakia	14	(10)
1947	Czechoslovakia B	2	(1)
- * Club domestic league appearances and goals

Jaroslav Cejp (7 April 1924 – 22 March 2002) was a Czechoslovak footballer who played as a forward. He won two Czechoslovak First League titles with Sparta Prague between 1945 and 1948, during which time he also finished as top scorer of the First League. As well as Sparta, he also played for SK Pardubice at the top level. Born in Carpathian Ruthenia, Cejp represented Czechoslovakia internationally, scoring 10 goals in 14 appearances for his nation between 1946 and 1951.

== Club career ==
Cejp began his football career with SK Pardubice, with whom he played across three seasons beginning in 1943. During the 1945–46 season, Cejp moved to Sparta Prague, becoming part of a team which went a Czechoslovak record 40 matches unbeaten and winning his first Czechoslovak league title that season. In the 1947–48 season, he again experienced winning the league title, and added to it by becoming the league's top scorer, with 21 goals. In 1950 Cejp scored his 100th league goal, going on to amass a total of 115 goals in his career.

== International career ==
Cejp scored twice on his international debut, a 4–3 win in a friendly match against Austria on 27 October 1946. Most of his 14 international appearances were in friendly matches, although he did play twice in the 1948–53 Central European International Cup, scoring in Czechoslovakia's 1–1 draw with Switzerland. He played his last match for Czechoslovakia in a home match against Romania on 20 May 1951, scoring once in a 2–2 draw. Cejp finished his career with 10 international goals in 14 matches.

== Career statistics ==
=== International ===
Czechoslovakia
Year	Apps	Goals
1946	1	2
1947	5	4
1948	4	1
1949	1	0
1950	2	2
1951	1	1
Total	14	10

=== International goals ===
Scores and results list Czechoslovakia goal tally first.

#	Date	Venue	Opponent	Result	Competition
1.	27 October 1946		Austria	4–3	Friendly
2.	27 October 1946		Austria	4–3	Friendly
3.	11 May 1947		Yugoslavia	3–1	Friendly
4.	31 August 1947		Poland	6–3	Friendly
5.	21 September 1947		Romania	6–2	Friendly
6.	21 September 1947		Romania	6–2	Friendly
7.	10 October 1948		Switzerland	1–1	1948–53 Central European International Cup
8.	17 September 1950		Albania	3–0	Friendly
9.	22 October 1950		Poland	4–1	Friendly
10.	20 May 1951		Romania	2–2	Friendly

== Honours ==
=== Club ===
Sparta Prague

- Czechoslovak First League (2): 1945–46 1947–48.
- Czech Cup (1): 1946

=== Individual ===
- Czechoslovak First League top scorer: 1947–48
