= Szusza Ferenc Stadion =

Football stadium in Budapest, Hungary

Coordinates: 47°34′30″N 19°5′5″E

- Megyer, Megyeri út
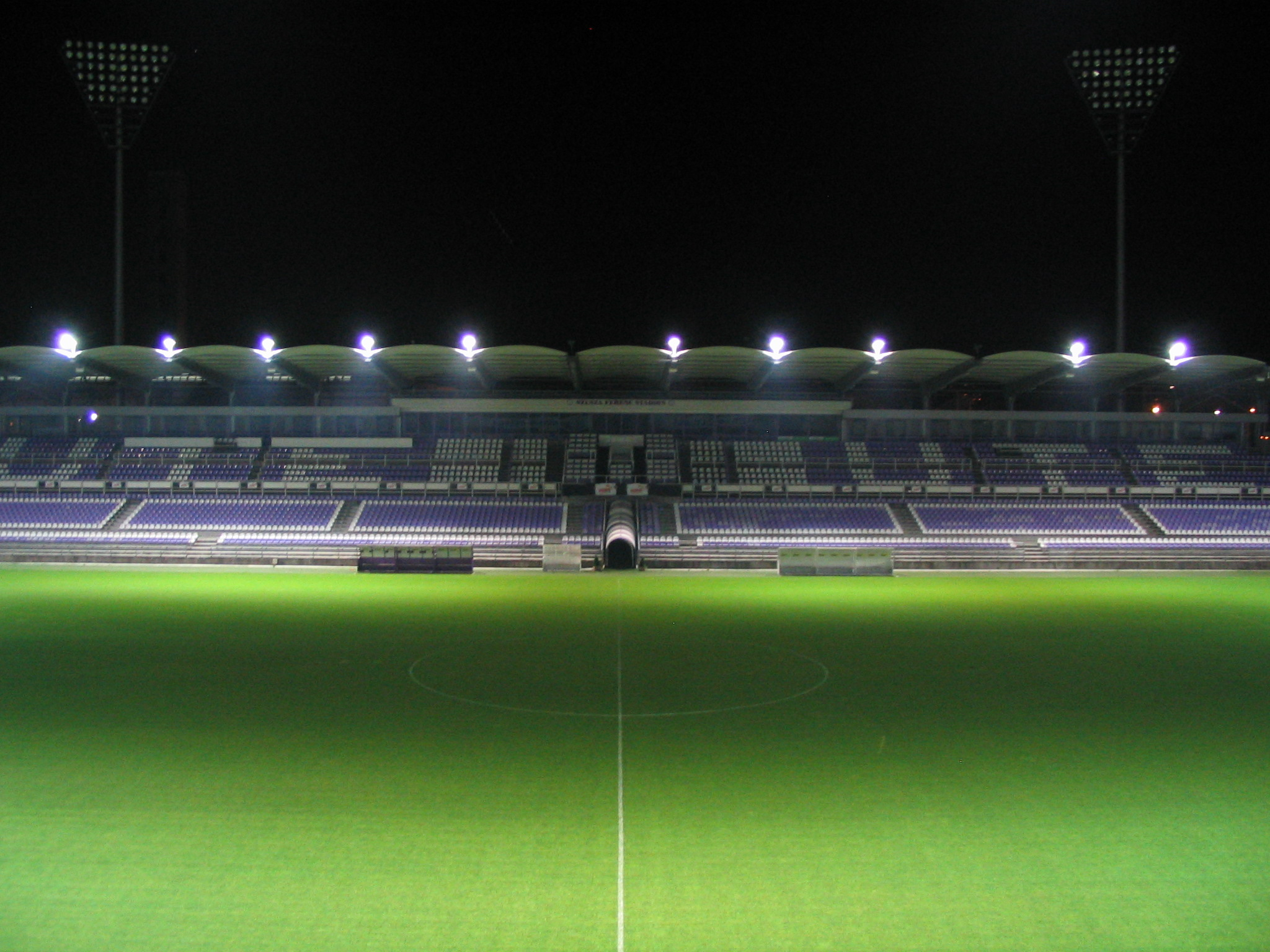
- View from stand B UEFA
- Interactive map of Szusza Ferenc Stadion
- Full name: Szusza Ferenc Stadion
- Location: Megyeri út 13, Újpest, Budapest
- Owner: NUSI
- Capacity: 12,670
- Surface: GrassMaster
- Field size: 105 x 68 meters

Construction
- Built: 1921–22
- Opened: 17 September 1922
- Renovated: 1924–25, 1925–26, 1929, 1945, 1945–46, 1954, 1962–63, 1999, 2000–01, 2017, 2022
- Architect: Alfréd Hajós

Tenants
- Újpest FC; Hungary (1948–1953 and some matches); Vasas SC (2016–17)

Szusza Ferenc Stadion (formerly known as Megyeri úti Stadion or simply Megyeri út) is a football stadium in Újpest and the home of Újpest FC. The stadium was designed by Alfréd Hajós and opened on 17 September 1922. The stadium was renovated in 2000–01; its capacity is 12,670.

Since 2003 the stadium has been named after Ferenc Szusza (1923–2006), one of the best strikers in Hungarian football history.

== History ==
After one year of construction the stadium was opened on 17 September 1922, with the match Újpest v Ferencváros 2–1. From June 1925 to June 1929 a bicycle track was running around the ground allowing it to be used as a velodrome. Since the track was occupying some parts of the stands, the capacity was reduced to 15,000 people.

A flood in 1945 destroyed the stands but after the renovations in 1946 the Megyeri úti Stadion became the largest stadium in Hungary with a capacity of 45,117 people. The stadium saw its first international game in 1948, Hungary beating Romania 9–0.

The main events of the World Festival of Youth and Students were also held in this stadium in 1949. In the mid-50s an athletic track was installed at the stadium reducing the capacity to 32,000.

Floodlights were installed in April 1968, and the Inter-Cities Fairs Cup final against Newcastle United was also held here in 1969. The 1972 and 2007 Hungarian Cup final matches were played in the stadium as well.

Until 2000 the only change made in the stadium was the renovation of the floodlight system in 1988. Between 2000 and 2001 the stadium was completely renovated. It was changed into an all-seater stadium, holding 13,501 people and completely roofed.

In 2003 the Megyeri úti Stadion was named Szusza Ferenc Stadion.

On 16 October 2016 István Őze, director of the club, announced that reconstruction of the stadium would be finished by the end of October 2016. The capacity of the stadium was decreased from 13,501 to 12,670.

In 2023, Belarus, due to its prolonged support of Russia in its invasion of neighbouring Ukraine, was required to play its home matches in the UEFA Euro 2024 qualifiers outside of Belarus until further notice. Their home match in March, against Switzerland, was played in Novi Sad, Serbia, but from then, Belarus started playing its home matches on the stadium. Their first match, against Israel in June, ended in a 1–2 defeat, before a 2–1 victory over Kosovo three days later. In October, Belarus met Romania in a 0–0 draw, and their last match on the stadium, in November, saw another victory for Belarus with a late penalty winner against Andorra.

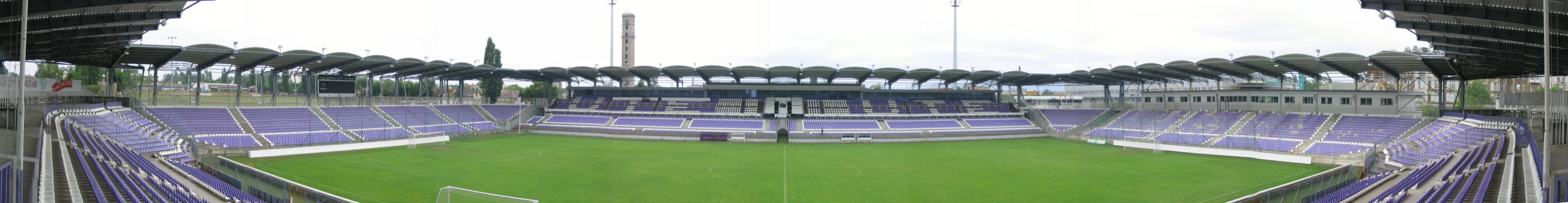
Szusza Ferenc Stadium in 2003

On 18 November 2023, Belarus hosted Andorra in the UEFA Euro 2024 qualifying match at the stadium. The match ended with a 1–0 victory for Belarus.

=== New stadium ===
On 25 July 2024, Péter Ratatics announced at the Bálványos Free Summer University and Student Camp in Tusványos that a new stadium would be built.

On 5 October 2024, it was announced that the new stadium would be built in south east Újpest, close to the border with Rákospalota (15th district of Budapest).

On 22 July 2025, the plans were made public on the website of Magyar Építők.

On 10 October 2025, an article, published on Telex, said that the new stadium would be built without improving public transport. Dávid Vitézy, former candidate of Mayor of Budapest, heavily criticized this decision.

On 18 October 2025, the construction of the stadium was categorized as 'special investment' meaning that the members of the government signed guarantees that the stadium would be built in the near future.

Thanks to the results of the 2026 Hungarian parliamentary election, there were doubts whether the new stadium could be built. However, an article, published on Magyar Nemzet, confirmed that the construction will be financed by MOL Group and the results of the elections would not effect the building of the new stadium.

On 29 April 2026, Tibor Déri, vice mayor of Újpest, asked the new government to revise the project previously labelled as special investments.

== Attendance ==
=== Records ===
Record Attendance:

- 50,000 Hungary v Austria, October 3, 1948, (International Friendly)
- 50,000 Hungary v Austria, May 8, 1949, (International Friendly)
- 50,000 Hungary v Sweden, November 20, 1949, (International Friendly)

Record league Attendance:

- 40,000 Újpest FC v Ferencvárosi TC, September 18, 1949

Record average Attendance (League):

- 1952: 20,571

=== Average attendances (Hungarian League) ===
- 2022–23: 3,708
- 2023–24: 5,001
- 2024–25: 5,947

== International matches ==
Until 2021, 29 international matches have been played at Szusza Ferenc Stadion. The ground was the 'home stadium' for the Hungarian national team between 1948 and 1953, and also numerous international games were played here since the reconstruction of 2001. Hungary was unbeaten in the Szusza Stadion from 1948 to 2006 (58 years), when they lost against Norway 4-1.

=== Match details ===
6 June 1948 1948 Balkan Cup	Hungary	9–0	Romania	Megyeri úti Stadium
18:00	Mészáros 30', 46'; Egresi 43', 61', 72'; Puskás 58', 82'; Kocsis 67', 85'	Report		Attendance: 45,000; Referee: Antun Mlinarić (Yugoslavia)

3 October 1948 Friendly	Hungary	2–1	Austria	Megyeri úti Stadium
15:00	Deák 16'; Szusza 30'	Report	Melchior 41'	Attendance: 30,000; Referee: Jaroslav Vlček (Czechoslovakia)

8 May 1949 1948–53 Central European International Cup	Hungary	6–1	Austria	Megyeri úti Stadium
17:30	Deák 2', 49'; Kocsis 22'; Puskás 32', 82' (pen.), 89'	Report	Melchior 79'	Attendance: 50,000; Referee: Jaroslav Vlček (Czechoslovakia)

12 June 1949 1948–53 Central European International Cup	Hungary	1–1	Italy	Megyeri úti Stadium
18:00	Deák 29'	Report	Carapellese 11'	Attendance: 45,000; Referee: Bill Evans (England)

30 October 1949 Friendly	Hungary	5–0	Bulgaria	Megyeri úti Stadium
14:00	Deák 17'; Budai 57'; Rudas 67'; Puskás 70', 84'	Report		Attendance: 36,000; Referee: Jaroslav Vlček (Czechoslovakia)

20 November 1949 Friendly	Hungary	5–0	Sweden	Megyeri úti Stadium
13:30	Kocsis 9', 49', 56'; Puskás 24'; Deák 70'	Report		Attendance: 46,000; Referee: George Reader (England)

30 April 1950 Friendly	Hungary	5–0	Czechoslovakia	Megyeri úti Stadium
17:00	Puskás 38', 85'; Kocsis 58', 70'; Szilágyi 65'	Report		Attendance: 47,000; Referee: Ştefan Alexandriu (Romania)

24 September 1950 Friendly	Hungary	12–0	Albania	Megyeri úti Stadium
15:30	Puskás 18', 36', 75', 82'; Budai 33', 52', 60', 65'; Palotás 39', 50'; Kocsis 42', 53'	Report		Attendance: 38,000; Referee: Jozef Nemčovský (Czechoslovakia)

29 October 1950 Friendly	Hungary	4–3	Austria	Megyeri úti Stadium
14:00	Puskás 10', 13', 90'; Szilágyi 67'	Report	Wagner 24', 52'; Melchior 85'	Attendance: 45,000; Referee: Arthur Blythe (England)

27 May 1951 Friendly	Hungary	6–0	Poland	Megyeri úti Stadium
17:00	Kocsis 27', 70'; Sándor 37'; Puskás 72', 75' (pen.); Czibor 82'	Report		Attendance: 42,000; Referee: Jaroslav Vlček (Czechoslovakia)

18 November 1951 Friendly	Hungary	8–0	Finland	Megyeri úti Stadium
13:30	Hidegkuti 9', 28', 85'; Kocsis 23', 31'; Czibor 54'; Puskás 69' (pen.), 71'	Report		Attendance: 40,000; Referee: Jaroslav Vlček (Czechoslovakia)

19 October 1952 Friendly	Hungary	5–0	Czechoslovakia	Megyeri úti Stadium
14:30	Hidegkuti 5'; Egresi 14'; Kocsis 27', 37', 78'	Report		Attendance: 48,000; Referee: Józef Szlejfer (Poland)

26 April 1953 Friendly	Hungary	1–1	Austria	Megyeri úti Stadium
17:00	Czibor 43'	Report	Hinesser 16'	Attendance: 44,000; Referee: Bill Evans (England)

16 April 1961 1962 World Cup qualifiers	Hungary	2–0	East Germany	Megyeri úti Stadium
16:30	Albert 12'; Göröcs 52'	Report		Attendance: 26,590; Referee: Yordan Takov (Bulgaria)

6 May 1972 1974 World Cup qualifiers	Hungary	3–0	Malta	Megyeri úti Stadium
18:30	L. Kocsis 35'; Bene 60'; Juhász 75'	Report		Attendance: 5,646; Referee: Milivoje Gugulović (Yugoslavia)

5 September 1990 Friendly	Hungary	4–1	Turkey	Megyeri úti Stadium
17:30	Kovács 3'; Kozma 5'; Kiprich 8', 74' (pen.)	Report	Çolak 54'	Attendance: 1,500; Referee: Michał Listkiewicz (Poland)

14 November 2001 Friendly	Hungary	5–0	Macedonia	Megyeri úti Stadium
20:15	Lisztes 4', 74'; Ferenczi 27'; Tököli 57' (pen.); Tokody 65'	Report		Attendance: 12,000; Referee: Yuri Klyuchnikov (Russia)

16 October 2002 Euro 2004 qualifiers	Hungary	3–0	San Marino	Megyeri úti Stadium
20:30	Gera 49', 60', 88'	Report		Attendance: 4,136; Referee: Gylfi Orrason (Iceland)

30 March 2003 Friendly	Hungary	5–1	Luxembourg	Megyeri úti Stadium
20:15	Gera 18'; Szabics 50', 90+2'; Lisztes 61'; Kenesei 68'	Report	Strasser 26'	Attendance: 1,205; Referee: Damir Skomina (Slovenia)

8 September 2004 2006 World Cup qualifiers	Hungary	2–1	Iceland	Szusza Ferenc Stadium
21:15	Gera 62'; Torghelle 75'; Szabics 79'	Report	Guðjohnsen 39'; Sigurðsson 78'	Attendance: 5,461; Referee: Tom Henning Øvrebø (Norway)

30 March 2005 2006 World Cup qualifiers	Hungary	1–1	Bulgaria	Szusza Ferenc Stadium
20:45	Rajczi 90'	Report	Petrov 52'	Attendance: 11,586; Referee: Jan Wegereef (Netherlands)

3 September 2005 2006 World Cup qualifiers	Hungary	4–0	Malta	Szusza Ferenc Stadium
20:45	Torghelle 35'; Said 55' (o.g.); Takács 64'; Rajczi 85'	Report		Attendance: 6,744; Referee: Vitaliy Hodulian (Ukraine)

12 October 2005 2006 World Cup qualifiers	Hungary	0–0	Croatia	Szusza Ferenc Stadium
19:30		Report		Attendance: 6,979; Referee: Claus Bo Larsen (Denmark)

24 May 2006 Friendly	Hungary	2–0	New Zealand	Szusza Ferenc Stadium
19:00	Huszti 48'; Szabics 80'	Report		Attendance: 6,500; Referee: Vladimír Hriňák (Slovakia)

2 September 2006 Euro 2008 qualifiers	Hungary	1–4	Norway	Szusza Ferenc Stadium
20:00	Gera 89' (pen.)	Report	Solskjær 15', 54'; Strømstad 32'; Pedersen 41'	Attendance: 12,283; Referee: Pieter Vink (Netherlands)

28 March 2007 Euro 2008 qualifiers	Hungary	2–0	Moldova	Szusza Ferenc Stadium
18:00	Priskin 9'; Gera 63'	Report		Attendance: 6,150; Referee: Martin Ingvarsson (Sweden)

13 October 2007 Euro 2008 qualifiers	Hungary	2–0	Malta	Szusza Ferenc Stadium
16:20	Feczesin 34'; Tőzsér 77'	Report		Attendance: 7,633; Referee: Karen Nalbandyan (Armenia)

31 May 2008 Friendly	Hungary	1–1	Croatia	Szusza Ferenc Stadium
20:30	Kovač 44' (o.g.)	Report	Kovač 24'	Attendance: 8,000; Referee: Damien Ledentu (France)

8 June 2021 Friendly	Hungary	0–0	Republic of Ireland	Szusza Ferenc Stadium
20:00		Report		Referee: Daniel Stefański (Poland)

16 June 2023 Friendly	Belarus	1–2	Israel	Szusza Ferenc Stadium
20:45	Ebong 16'	Report	Weissman 85' (pen.); Gloukh 90+2'	Referee: Jarred Gillett (Australia)

19 June 2023	Belarus	2–1	Kosovo	Szusza Ferenc Stadium
20:45	Morozov 73'; Ebong 75'	Report	Muriqi 87' (pen.)	Referee: Julian Weinberger (Austria)

12 October 2023	Belarus	0–0	Romania	Szusza Ferenc Stadium
20:45		Report		Referee: Espen Eskås (Norway)

21 March 2024 UEFA Euro 2024 qualifying play-offs Semi-final	Israel	1–4	Iceland	Szusza Ferenc Stadion
20:45	Zahavi 31' (pen.)	Report	A. Guðmundsson 39', 83', 87'; Traustason 42'	Attendance: 1,226; Referee: Anthony Taylor (England)

11 June 2024 Friendly	Belarus	0–4	Israel	Szusza Ferenc Stadion
18:00 UTC+2		Report	Melamed 7'; Safouri 18'; Shlomo 36'; Kna'an 82'	Referee: Tamás Bognár (Hungary)

== Attendances ==
As of 2 June 2018

Season	Average
2010–11	3,895
2011–12	3,908
2012–13	3,392
2013–14	2,612
2014–15	2,368
2015–16	2,822
2016–17	2,452
2017–18	3,462

== Gallery ==
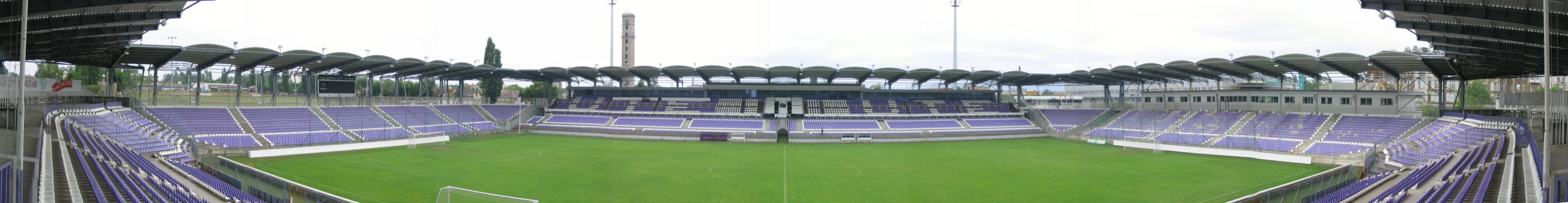
The main stand

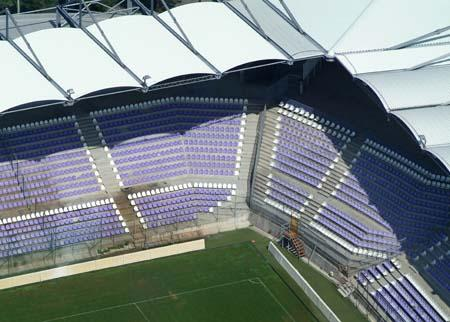
The corner

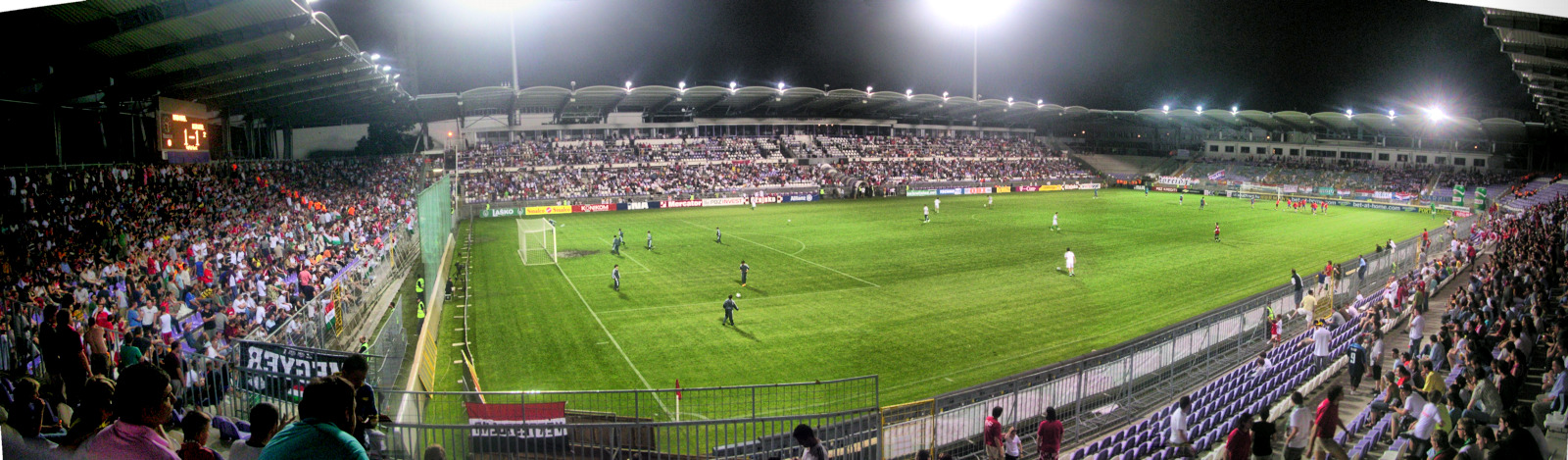
Interior
