= List of nicknamed FIFA World Cup matches =

The following article contains a list of FIFA World Cup association football matches that have been given names that are widely used or recalled in reference to the match, a famous play during the match, or as part of the legacy of an associated national team. This list does not include matches named for being a final, semi-final, or quarter-final match unless they are referred to by a separate nickname besides their official yearly name (i.e. the Miracle of Bern for the 1954 FIFA World Cup final).

== List ==
=== Finals ===
Name	Date	First team	Score	Second team	Notes
Battle of Bordeaux	12 June 1938	Brazil	1–1	Czechoslovakia	1938 FIFA World Cup quarter-final match: Nicknamed due to a number of brutal fouls and injuries by both sides, due to the lax officiating of Hungarian referee Pál von Hertzka.
Miracle of Belo Horizonte	29 June 1950	United States	1–0	England	Considered as one of the greatest upsets in the history of association football due to a goal by Haitian-born U.S. center forward Joe Gaetjens.
Maracanaço	16 July 1950	Uruguay	2–1	Brazil	1950 FIFA World Cup final: Notorious as one of the biggest upsets in the sport's history against Brazil in its World Cup stadium, the Maracanã Stadium.
Hitzeschlacht von Lausanne	26 June 1954	Austria	7–5	Switzerland	1954 FIFA World Cup quarter-final match: Known for setting the current World Cup record of 12 goals scored in a match in 40 °C (104 °F) weather.
Battle of Berne	27 June 1954	Hungary	4–2	Brazil	1954 FIFA World Cup quarter-final match: Infamous for violent conduct and fighting during and following the match, prompting English referee Arthur Ellis to send off three players during the match.
Miracle of Bern	4 July 1954	West Germany	3–2	Hungary	1954 FIFA World Cup final: Considered one of the greatest matches in World Cup history, and also one of its most unexpected upsets due to West Germany beating the unbeaten Hungarian Golden Team, after having been beaten by them 8–3 in the group stage.
Disaster of Sweden	15 June 1958	Czechoslovakia	6–1	Argentina	The heaviest defeat of the Albiceleste team in a FIFA World Cup, resulting in its early elimination from the 1958 FIFA World Cup.
Battle of Santiago	2 June 1962	Chile	2–0	Italy	Match infamous for its level of violence between players, requiring police intervention four times. The referee of the game, Ken Aston, later went on to invent yellow and red cards.
Game of the Century	17 June 1970	Italy	4–3	West Germany	1970 FIFA World Cup semi-final match: Involved five of seven goals being scored in extra time, the record for most goals scored during extra time in a FIFA World Cup game.
The Miracle / Disgrace of Córdoba	21 June 1978	Austria	3–2	West Germany	Represented the first time in 47 years that Austria had defeated a team from either the Western or Eastern side of the then-partitioned Germany.
The 6 to 0 at Peru	21 June 1978	Argentina	6–0	Peru	Regarded as one of the most controversial matches in World Cup history due to speculation of collusion in favor of Argentina amid the military dictatorship of the National Reorganization Process under Jorge Rafael Videla.
Disgrace of Gijón	25 June 1982	West Germany	1–0	Austria	Controversial match due to both teams coming to a virtual standstill in the second half after one score by West Germany, allowing both to advance to the next round while Algeria was eliminated.
Sarrià Tragedy	5 July 1982	Italy	3–2	Brazil	Described as one of the greatest matches in the history of association football, as a result of a hat-trick by Italian striker Paolo Rossi, resulting in the elimination of Brazil and Italy eventually winning the tournament.
Night of Seville	8 July 1982	West Germany	3–3 (5–4 West German victory on penalties)	France	1982 FIFA World Cup semi-final match: Regarded as one of the best football matches of all time, due to it featuring back-and-forth scoring, four goals in extra time, and a dramatic penalty shoot-out.
Goal of the Century	22 June 1986	Argentina	2–1	England	1986 FIFA World Cup Quarter-final match: Held four years after the Falklands War between Argentina and the United Kingdom, involving the "Hand of God goal" and leading Argentina to winning the 1986 World Cup.
The Mother of All Games	21 June 1998	United States	1–2	Iran	Described as the most politically charged game in World Cup history due to Iranian Prime Minister Mohammad Mosaddegh's nationalization of Iran's oil industry, American support for Iraq during the Iran–Iraq War, and the US killing of all 290 Iranian passengers on Iran Air Flight 655. Resulted in an Iranian upset, granting the team its first ever victory in the history of the FIFA World Cup.
Battle of Nuremberg	25 June 2006	Portugal	1–0	Netherlands	Match that set the new record for cards shown at any FIFA-administered international tournament, with Russian referee Valentin Ivanov issuing four red cards and 16 yellow cards.
The Zidane Headbutt	9 July 2006	Italy	1–1 (5–3 Italian victory on penalties)	France	2006 FIFA World Cup final: Regarded as a key match in the France–Italy football rivalry, leading to Italy's first world title in 24 years. Also notable for French player Zinedine Zidane being sent off for head-butting Marco Materazzi in the chest.
Battle of Johannesburg	11 July 2010	Netherlands	0–1	Spain	2010 FIFA World Cup final: First world cup title of Spain, with the match including numerous bookings throughout the first half.
7–1 / Mineiraço	8 July 2014	Brazil	1–7	Germany	2014 FIFA World Cup semi-final match: Historic loss of the Brazilian team in their home stadium to Germany, who led 5–0 within 29 minutes, with four goals being scored inside a six-minute span, before bringing the score up to 7–0 in the second half. The match marked the largest margin of victory in a FIFA World Cup semi-final, the breaking of Brazil's 62-match unbeaten streak at home in competitive matches back to 1975, and equalled their biggest margin of defeat in a match alongside a 6–0 loss to Uruguay in 1920. The match's outcome was described as a national humiliation, evoking the previous "spirit of national shame" of the Maracanaço in 1950.
Rostov's 14 Seconds	2 July 2018	Belgium	3–2	Japan	2018 FIFA World Cup round of 16 match: Belgium scored 3 goals in the second half after a 2-0 deficit against Japan, including a counter-attack in stoppage time that led to the game winning goal by Nacer Chadli. Japan were once again knocked out in round of 16.
Battle of Lusail	9 December 2022	Netherlands	2–2 (3–4 Argentine victory on penalties)	Argentina	2022 FIFA World Cup Quarter-final match: Spanish referee Antonio Mateu Lahoz issued a FIFA World Cup record 18 yellow cards and one red card, setting a new record for cautions at any FIFA-administered international tournament.
Disgrace of Kansas City / Second Missouri Compromise	27 June 2026	Algeria	3–3	Austria	Prior to kickoff, the match was given the nickname the "Disgrace of Kansas City", as there were concerns it would end up similarly to the Disgrace of Gijón, with a draw seeing both sides advance at the expense of Iran. Additionally, some have since dubbed the match the "Second Missouri Compromise", as it happened in the American state of Missouri.

=== Qualifiers ===
Name	Date	First team	Score	Second team	Notes
19 May Incident	19 May 1985	China PR	1–2	Hong Kong	Significant upset by Hong Kong to eliminate the favored and rival Chinese team, resulting in angered home fans rioting in the Workers' Stadium, requiring the People's Armed Police to restore order.
El Maracanazo	3 September 1989	Brazil	2–0	Chile	Qualifying game involving Chilean goalkeeper Roberto Rojas pretended to be injured by a flare thrown by Brazilian fans and the Chilean team leaving the game in protest. The incident is considered by many to be one of the most shameful events in world football, resulting in a life ban for Rojas, the end of his career, and a ban against the Chilean team from qualifying for the 1994 World Cup.
Shot heard 'round the world	19 November 1989	(Trinidad and Tobago) Trinidad & Tobago	0–1	United States	Match involving one of the most historic goals in U.S. soccer history, allowing it to qualify for the 1990 FIFA World Cup after 40 years.
0–5	5 September 1993	Argentina	0–5	Colombia	The only setback the Argentine national team has ever suffered playing at home against the Colombian team that qualified for the 1994 World Cup, beating them 5–0, leaving the Argentine team to play the playoff against Australia.
Agony of Doha	28 October 1993	Japan	2–2	Iraq	Match preventing the qualification of Japan to the 1994 World Cup, and allowing their arch-rivals South Korea to qualify instead.
One team in Tallinn	9 October 1996	Estonia	N/A	Scotland	Qualifying match abandoned after three seconds because the Estonian team were absent from the Kadrioru Stadium due to a dispute over its floodlights.
The last game at the old Wembley	7 October 2000	England	0–1	Germany	Last game played at the original Wembley Stadium before its demolition.
31–0	11 April 2001	Australia	31–0	American Samoa	World record for the largest victory in an international football match, with Australia winning the game 31–0.
Aztecazo	16 June 2001	Mexico	1–2	Costa Rica	Marked the first loss suffered by Mexico in the Azteca Stadium in a FIFA World Cup qualification match.
Hand of Frog	18 November 2009	France	2–1	Republic of Ireland	Known for a controversial William Gallas goal enabled by captain Thierry Henry handling the ball twice without being reviewed, allowing France to progress to the World Cup at the Irish team's expense.
Snow Clasico	22 March 2013	United States	1–0	Costa Rica	Qualification match played in heavy snowfall, leading to outrage in Costa Rica.
Haztecazo	6 September 2013	Mexico	1–2	Honduras	Second loss of the Mexican team at the Estadio Azteca during a FIFA World Cup qualification match, losing against Honduras.
Agony of Couva	10 October 2017	(Trinidad and Tobago) Trinidad & Tobago	2–1	United States	Qualification match resulting in the United States missing their first World Cup since 1986, as well as Trinidad and Tobago's team achieving their first win over the United States since 2008. The loss was the USMNT's worst up to that point based on the Elo rating system.
Battle of the "Iceteca"	16 November 2021	Canada	2–1	Mexico	Known for the temperature at kickoff being recorded as −9° Celsius, making it the coldest match ever played by the Mexico national team. Resulted in a Canadian victory, ending Mexico's eleven match unbeaten streak against Canada dating back to August 15, 2000.<ref>{{cite web |title=Canada national football team: record v Mexico |url=https://www.11v11.com/teams/canada/

== See also ==
- List of FIFA World Cup finals
- List of FIFA World Cup opening matches
- List of FIFA World Cup penalty shoot-outs
