= Néstor Carballo =

Uruguayan footballer (1929–1981)

Personal information
- Full name: Néstor E. Carballo
- Date of birth: 3 February 1929
- Place of birth: Uruguay
- Date of death: 22 September 1981 (aged 52)
- Height: 1.76 m (5 ft 9 in)
- Position: Midfielder

Senior career*
Years	Team	Apps	(Gls)
- Club Nacional de Football

International career
- Uruguay
- * Club domestic league appearances and goals

Néstor E. Carballo (3 February 1929 - 22 September 1981) was a Uruguayan football defender who played for Uruguay in the 1954 FIFA World Cup. He also played for Club Nacional de Football.
