= Jiří Trnka (footballer) =

Czechoslovak footballer

Personal information
- Date of birth: 2 December 1926
- Place of birth: Czechoslovakia
- Date of death: 1 March 2005 (aged 78)
- Position: Defender

Senior career*
Years	Team	Apps	(Gls)
- Dukla Prague

International career
1948–1955	Czechoslovakia	23	(3)
- * Club domestic league appearances and goals

Jiří Trnka (2 December 1926 – 1 March 2005) was a Czechoslovak football defender who played for Czechoslovakia in the 1954 FIFA World Cup. He also played for Dukla Prague.
