= Karol Borhy =

Czechoslovak football coach (1912–1997)

Personal information
- Date of birth: 23 June 1912
- Place of birth: Budapest, Austria-Hungary
- Date of death: 9 January 1997 (aged 84)
- Place of death: Lučenec, Slovakia

Managerial career
- Years: Team
- 1953–1954: Czechoslovakia
- 1957–1961: ČH Bratislava
- 1961–1962: Slovan Bratislava
- 1962–1963: Czechoslovakia Olympic
- 1962–1965: Jednota Trenčín
- 1969–1970: Jednota Trenčín

Karol Borhy (Hungarian: Károly Borhy, 23 June 1912 in Budapest – 9 January 1997 in Lučenec) was a Czechoslovak football coach. He led ČH Bratislava to the title in the 1958–59 Czechoslovak First League. Domestically he also managed ŠK Slovan Bratislava and Jednota Trenčín. Internationally Borhy managed the Czechoslovakia national football team and the Czechoslovakia Olympic football team. Borhy was a member of the Hungarian minority in Slovakia.

Borhy also worked for six years in Kuwait.
