= Ernst Melchior =

Austrian footballer (1920–1978)

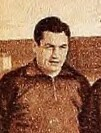

Personal information
- Full name: Ernst Melchior
- Date of birth: 26 June 1920
- Place of birth: Villach, Austria
- Date of death: 5 August 1978 (aged 58)
- Place of death: Rouen, France
- Position: Striker

Senior career*
Years	Team	Apps	(Gls)
1940–1946	Villacher SV		
1946–1953	Austria Wien	158	(120)
1954–1958	Rouen	158	(70)
1958–1959	Nantes	35	(16)

International career
1946–1953	Austria	36	(16)

Managerial career
- 1963–1964: Beşiktaş
- 1967: Fortuna Düsseldorf
- 1968–1969: Club Africain
- 1969–1972: Luxembourg
- 1972–1975: Rouen
- * Club domestic league appearances and goals

Ernst Melchior (26 June 1920 – 5 August 1978) was an Austrian professional footballer who played as a striker.

== Club career ==
Melchior was born in Villach. He played seven years for Austrian club Austria Wien before moving to France where he played for FC Rouen and FC Nantes.

== International career ==
Melchior made his debut for Austria in an April 1946 friendly match against Hungary and was a participant at the 1948 Summer Olympics. He earned 36 caps, scoring 16 goals. His last international was a November 1953 World Cup qualification match against Portugal.

=== International goals ===
Austria score listed first, score column indicates score after each Melchior goal.

No.	Date	Venue	Cap	Opponent	Score	Result	Competition
1	14 April 1946	Praterstadion, Vienna, Austria	1	Hungary	2–2	3–2	Friendly
2	18 April 1948	Praterstadion, Vienna, Austria	9	Switzerland	2–0	3–1	Friendly
3	2 May 1948	Praterstadion, Vienna, Austria	10	Hungary	1–1	3–2	1948–53 Central European International Cup
4	3 October 1948	Megyeri úti Stadion, Budapest, Hungary	14	Hungary	1–2	1–2	Friendly
5	8 May 1949	Megyeri úti Stadion, Budapest, Hungary	17	Hungary	1–4	1–6	1948–53 Central European International Cup
6	2 April 1950	Praterstadion, Vienna, Austria	19	Italy	1–0	1–0	1948–53 Central European International Cup
7	14 May 1950	Praterstadion, Vienna, Austria	20	Hungary	5–3	5–3	Friendly
8	8 October 1950	Praterstadion, Vienna, Austria	21	Yugoslavia	5–1	7–2	Friendly
9	8 October 1950	Praterstadion, Vienna, Austria	21	Yugoslavia	7–2	7–2	Friendly
10	29 October 1950	Megyeri úti Stadion, Budapest, Hungary	22	Hungary	3–3	3–4	Friendly
11	5 November 1950	Praterstadion, Vienna, Austria	23	Denmark	1–0	5–1	Friendly
12	13 December 1950	Hampden Park, Glasgow, Scotland	24	Scotland	1–0	1–0	Friendly
13	17 June 1951	Københavns Idrætspark, Copenhagen, Denmark	26	Denmark	1–0	3–3	Friendly
14	14 October 1951	Stade du Heysel, Brussels, Belgium	28	Belgium	4–1	8–1	Friendly
15	14 October 1951	Stade du Heysel, Brussels, Belgium	28	Belgium	7–1	8–1	Friendly
16	28 November 1951	Wembley, London, England	30	England	1–0	2–2	Friendly

== Managerial career ==
Melchior was manager of Beşiktaş J.K. (Turkey), Fortuna Düsseldorf (Germany), Club Africain (Tunisia) and Rouen (France). He was also the tenth manager of the Luxembourg national football team, in charge for 13 games.

Team	From	To	Record				
Team	From	To	P	W	D	L	Win %
Luxembourg	12 October 1969	23 April 1972	13	0	2	11	0.0
Total			13	0	2	11	0.0

== Death and legacy ==
Melchior died, aged 58, after a long illness in Rouen. In his honour, a gasse (street) in Vienna was named after him.
