= Kurt Schmied =

Austrian footballer

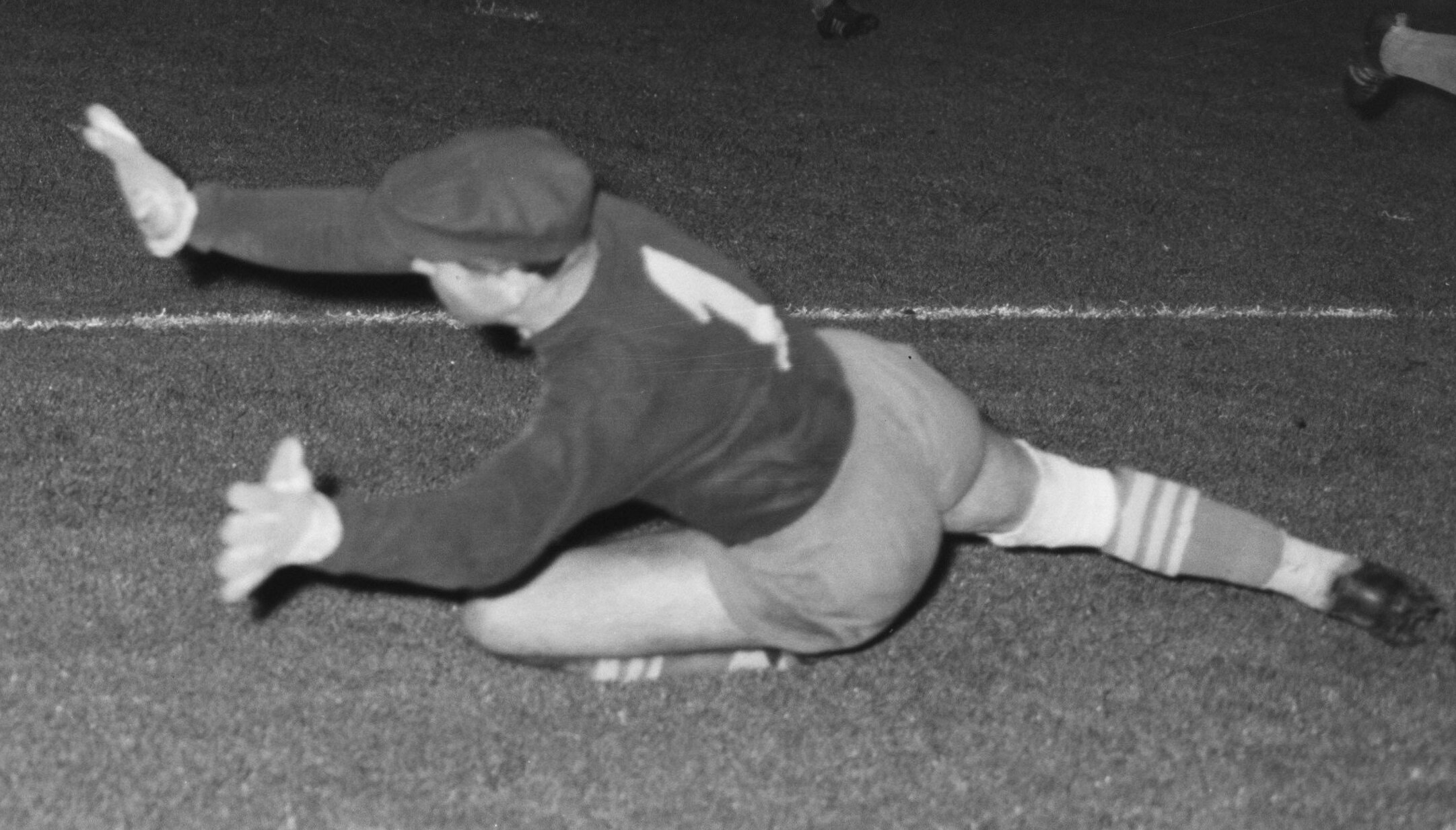
- Schmied playing for First Vienna in 1961

Personal information
- Full name: Kurt Schmied
- Date of birth: 14 June 1926
- Place of birth: Vienna, Austria
- Date of death: 9 December 2007 (aged 81)
- Place of death: Vienna, Austria
- Height: 1.75 m (5 ft 9 in)
- Position: Goalkeeper

Senior career*
Years	Team	Apps	(Gls)
1946–1947	SC Helfort Wien		
1947–1952	Wiener Sportclub		
1952–1965	First Vienna		
1965–1966	Austria Wien	8	(0)

International career
1954–1960	Austria	38	(0)
Medal record
Representing Austria
FIFA World Cup
Third place	1954 Switzerland
- * Club domestic league appearances and goals

Kurt Schmied (14 June 1926 – 9 December 2007) was an Austrian footballer. He is best remembered for playing goalkeeper for First Vienna FC and the Austria national football team.

== International career ==
He made his debut for Austria in May 1954 against Wales. He represented Austria during the FIFA World Cup 1954 and again in 1958. He was a hero of the quarter-final game versus Switzerland in the 1954 finals where he played on despite suffering from a debilitating heatstroke in a game that is often remembered as the Hitzeschlacht von Lausanne, or Heat Battle of Lausanne, and remains notable for being the game with the most goals scored in World Cup final history (Austria won the game, 7-5). He earned 38 caps, no goals scored.

He died in Vienna in December 2007.

== Honours ==
- Austrian Football Bundesliga (1):
  - 1955

== Sources ==
- Andrzej Gowarzewski "FUJI Football Encyclopedia - World Cup FIFA*part I*Biographical notes - Heroes of Mundials"; GiA Katowice 1993
