= Otto Hemele =

Czech footballer

Personal information
- Full name: Otakar Hemele
- Date of birth: 22 January 1926
- Place of birth: Prague, Czechoslovakia
- Date of death: 3 June 2001 (aged 75)
- Place of death: Prague, Czech Republic
- Position: Striker

Senior career*
Years	Team	Apps	(Gls)
1937–1942	Radlický AFK		
1942–1946	Slavia Prague		
1947	SK Židenice		
1947–1948	Slavia Prague		
1948–1950	ATK Prague		
1950–1953	Slavia Prague		
1953–1954	ÚDA Prague		
1955–1959	Slavia Prague		
1959–1965	Motorlet Prague		

International career
1948–1954	Czechoslovakia	10	(4)
- * Club domestic league appearances and goals

Otakar "Otto" Hemele (22 January 1926 in Prague – 3 June 2001 in Prague) was a Czech football player, who was a devoted player of Slavia Prague. He played for the Czechoslovakia national team (10 matches/4 goals) and was a participant at the 1954 FIFA World Cup, where he played two matches.
