= Walter Nausch =

Austrian footballer and manager (1907-1957)

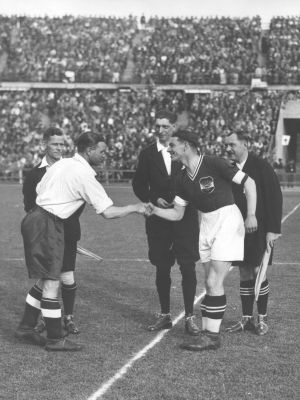
- Walter Nausch(right) Austria-England Eddie Hapgood (left) (1936)

Personal information
- Date of birth: 5 February 1907
- Place of birth: Vienna, Austria-Hungary
- Date of death: 11 July 1957 (aged 50)
- Place of death: Obertraun, Austria
- Position: Left-half

Youth career
- Josefstädter FC
- Libertas

Senior career*
Years	Team	Apps	(Gls)
1923–1925	SV Amateure Wien	7	(0)
1925–1929	Wiener Athletiksport Club	70	(14)
1929–1938	Austria Wien	160	(18)
Total		237	(32)

International career
1929–1937	Austria	39	(1)

Managerial career
- 1940–1948: Young Fellows Zürich
- 1948–1954: Austria
- 1954–1955: Austria Wien
- * Club domestic league appearances and goals

Walter Nausch (5 February 1907 – 11 July 1957) was an Austrian footballer, who later became a football manager. The captain of legendary Austrian "Wunderteam", Nausch was a versatile player who played in almost all positions on the pitch but was mainly a left wing half. He was known for his great physical condition, versatility, and tactical awareness.

== Playing career ==
=== Club career ===
Nausch played for FK Austria Wien between 1923–25 and 1929–38, interspersed with a spell at Wiener AC.

Nausch was chosen in Austria's Team of the Century in 2001.

=== International career ===
He made his debut for Austria in October 1929 against Switzerland but missed out on the 1934 FIFA World Cup. He earned 39 caps, scoring one goal.

== Coaching career ==
He worked later as a football coach with Young Fellows Zürich (1940–1948), the Austria national football team (1948–1954) and Austria Wien.

== Death ==
Nausch died of a heart attack in the morning on 11 July 1957 in Obertraun (Upper Austria), where he did spend in the so-called "Sportschule" (a training centre for football). See also "Arbeiterzeitung Wien/Vienna" from July 12, 1957, page 8).
