= Javier Ambrois =

Uruguayan footballer (1932-1975)

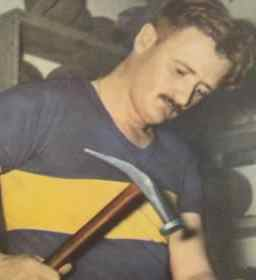
- Ambrois in 1958

Personal information
- Full name: Javier Ambrois Campaña
- Date of birth: May 9, 1932
- Place of birth: Montevideo, Uruguay
- Date of death: June 25, 1975 (aged 43)
- Place of death: Montevideo, Uruguay
- Position: Forward

Senior career*
Years	Team	Apps	(Gls)
1950–1954	Nacional	110	(46)
1955	Fluminense Football Club	6	(4)
1955–1957	Nacional	54	(32)
1958–1959	Boca Juniors CA	44	(13)
1960	Lanús	4	(0)
1961–1963	Defensor Sporting	42	(7)
Total		260	(102)

International career
1952–1957	Uruguay	31	(17)
- * Club domestic league appearances and goals

Javier Ambrois Campaña (May 9, 1932 in Montevideo, Uruguay – June 25, 1975 in Montevideo, Uruguay) was a Uruguayan footballer who played as forward for clubs of Uruguay, Argentina and Brazil, as well as the Uruguay national football team, appearing at the 1954 FIFA World Cup in Switzerland, and winning the 1956 South American Championship on home soil.

== Legacy ==
He and Humberto Maschio of Argentina were the joint top scorers of the 1957 South American Championship, with a record 9 goals each, the most goals scored by any player in a single edition of the South American Championship.

== Teams ==
- Nacional 1950–1954
- Fluminense 1955
- Nacional 1955–1957
- Boca Juniors 1958–1959
- Lanus 1960
- Defensor Sporting 1962–1963

== Career statistics ==
=== International ===
Appearances and goals by national team and year
National team	Year	Apps	Goals
Uruguay	1952	3	0
Uruguay	1953	0	0
Uruguay	1954	8	4
Uruguay	1955	0	0
Uruguay	1956	9	3
Uruguay	1957	11	10
Total		31	17

== Honours ==
=== Club ===
Nacional

- Uruguayan Championship: 1950, 1952, 1955, 1956

=== International ===
Uruguay

- Copa América: 1956

=== Individual ===
- Copa América Top-Scorer: 1957 (alongside Humberto Maschio, 9 goals)
