= Luis Cruz (Uruguayan footballer) =

Uruguayan footballer (1925-1998)

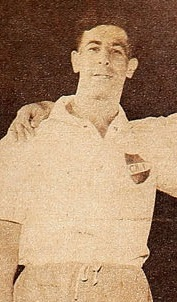

Personal information
- Full name: Luis Alberto Cruz Díaz
- Date of birth: 28 April 1925
- Place of birth: Uruguay
- Date of death: 1998 (aged 72–73)
- Position: Midfielder

Senior career*
| Years | Team | Apps | (Gls) |
| 1946–1958 | Club Nacional de Football | 287 | (5) |

International career
| 1953–1954 | Uruguay | 12 | (0) |
- * Club domestic league appearances and goals

Luis Alberto Cruz Díaz (28 April 1925 – 1998) was a Uruguayan football midfielder who played for Uruguay in the 1954 FIFA World Cup. He also played for Club Nacional de Football. Cruz played in 287 domestic matches scoring 5 goals.
