= Leopold Barschandt =

Austrian footballer

Leo Barschandt
Personal information
- Full name: Leopold Barschandt
- Date of birth: 12 August 1925
- Place of birth: Austria
- Date of death: 5 October 2000 (aged 75)
- Position: Defender

Senior career*
Years	Team	Apps	(Gls)
1945–1948	SPC Helfort Wien		
1948–1950	SC Gaswerk Wien		
1950–1960	Wiener Sport-Club		
1960–1963	SV Stickstoff Linz		

International career
1954–1960	Austria	23	(0)
Medal record
Representing Austria
FIFA World Cup
Third place	1954 Switzerland
- * Club domestic league appearances and goals

Leopold Barschandt (12 August 1925 – 5 October 2000) was an Austrian footballer.

== International career ==
Barschandt earned 23 caps and scored 1 goal for the Austria national football team from 1954 to 1960, and participated in the 1954 FIFA World Cup and the 1958 FIFA World Cup.

== Honours ==
- Austrian Football Bundesliga (2):
  - 1958, 1959
