= Jan Hertl =

Czech footballer

Personal information
- Date of birth: 23 January 1929
- Date of death: 14 May 1996 (aged 67)
- Height: 1.73 m (5 ft 8 in)
- Position: Midfielder

International career
Years	Team	Apps	(Gls)
1952–1958	Czechoslovakia	23	(1)

Jan Hertl (born 23 January 1929 – 14 May 1996) was a Czech footballer.

During his club career he played for Dukla Prague and Sparta Prague. He earned 23 caps and scored one goal for Czechoslovakia between 1952 and 1958, and represented the country in two World Cups.
