= William Martínez (footballer) =

Uruguayan footballer (1928-1997)

Wílliam Martínez
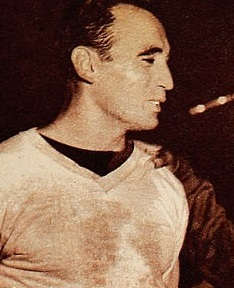
- Martinez in 1955

Personal information
- Full name: Wílliam Ruben Martínez Carreras
- Date of birth: January 13, 1928
- Place of birth: Pueblo Victoria, Uruguay
- Date of death: December 28, 1997 (aged 69)
- Position: Defender

Youth career
- –1942: Sportivo Alba
- 1942–1943: Nacional

Senior career*
Years	Team	Apps	(Gls)
1943–1946	Nacional		
1947–1948	Racing Montevideo		
1948–1954	Rampla Juniors		
1955–1962	Peñarol		
1963–1967	Rampla Juniors		
1967–1968	Atlético Junior		
1968–1969	Rampla Juniors		
1969–1970	Fenix		
1970	Central Español		

International career
1950–1965	Uruguay	54	(2)
Medal record
Representing Uruguay
FIFA World Cup
Winner	1950 Brazil
- * Club domestic league appearances and goals

Wílliam Ruben Martínez Carreras (January 13, 1928 – December 28, 1997) was a Uruguayan footballer who played as a defender. He played 54 times for the Uruguay national football team between 1950 and 1965.

== Club career ==
Martínez came through the youth team of local side Sportivo Alba de Victoria and signed on as a youth player for Nacional in 1962. After playing for Nacional at various youth levels and for the first team he joined Racing Club de Montevideo in 1947.

In 1948, he joined Rampla Juniors, where he spent 7 seasons before joining Peñarol

It was with Peñarol that Martínez enjoyed most of his success at the club level. During his time with the club he captained the team to five consecutive league titles (1958–1962), two Copa Libertadores (1960, 1961), the Copa Intercontinental in 1961 and four consecutive editions of the Copa Uruguay (1958–1961).

In 1963 Martínez returned to Rampla Juniors, in 1967 he joined Atlético Junior in Colombia before returning for a third spell with Rampla Juniors.

In the last years of his playing career he worked as the player-manager of Fenix and Central Español. He retired from football in 1970 at the age of 42.

== International career ==
Martínez was in the Uruguay squads for three FIFA World Cup tournaments (1950, 1954 and 1962). He played a total of 54 matches scoring 2 goals.

Martínez won the Copa América with Uruguay in 1956, he also played in three other editions of the tournament (1953, 1955 and 1959A).

== Honours ==
Nacional

- Primera División Uruguaya: 1943, 1946
- Torneo de Honor: 1943, 1946
- Torneo Competencia: 1945
- Copa de Confraternidad Escobar – Gerona: 1945
- Copa Aldao: 1946

Rampla Juniors

- Torneo Competencia: 1950
- Torneo Cuadrangular: 1953

C.A. Peñarol

- Primera División Uruguaya: 1958, 1959, 1960, 1961, 1962
- Torneo Competencia: 1956, 1957
- Torneo de Honor: 1956
- Cuadrangular Tournament: 1955, 1957, 1959, 1960
- Cuadrangular in Mexico: 1957
- Copa Libertadores: 1960, 1961
- Intercontinental Cup: 1961

Uruguay

- 1950 FIFA World Cup: 1950
- 1956 South American Championship: 1956

=== Individual ===
- FIFA World Cup All-Star Team: 1954
- IFFHS Uruguayan Men's Dream Team (Team B)
