= Ladislav Hlaváček =

Czechoslovak footballer

Personal information
- Date of birth: 26 June 1925
- Place of birth: Czechoslovakia
- Date of death: 21 April 2014 (aged 88)
- Position: Forward

Senior career*
Years	Team	Apps	(Gls)
- Dukla Prague

International career
1948–1954	Czechoslovakia	15	(5)
- * Club domestic league appearances and goals

Ladislav Hlaváček (26 June 1925 – 21 April 2014; Prague) was a Czechoslovak football forward who played for Czechoslovakia in the 1954 FIFA World Cup. He also played for Dukla Prague.
