= Carlos Borges =

Uruguayan footballer (1932–2014)

Personal information
- Full name: Carlos Ariel Borges Galasso
- Date of birth: 14 January 1932
- Place of birth: Montevideo, Uruguay
- Date of death: 5 February 2014 (aged 82)
- Place of death: Montevideo, Uruguay
- Position: Forward

Senior career*
Years	Team	Apps	(Gls)
1950–1960	Peñarol		
1961–1963	Racing		
1964	Huracán Buceo		
1964	Atlético Platense		

International career
1954–1959	Uruguay	35	(10)
Medal record
Representing Uruguay
Men's Football
South American Championship
Winner	1956 Uruguay	National Team
- * Club domestic league appearances and goals

Carlos Ariel Borges Galasso (14 January 1932 – 5 February 2014) was a Uruguayan footballer who played for Uruguay national team. He is best known for scoring the first-ever goal in the history of Copa Libertadores. He is also one of the three Uruguayan footballers ever to score a hat-trick in FIFA World Cup. He achieved this feat in 1954 FIFA World Cup against Scotland.

Borges earned 35 caps and scored 10 goals for the national team from 1954 to 1959. He represented the nation in the 1954 FIFA World Cup in which they finished fourth. He was a part of the squad which won 1956 South American Championship two years later. Borges died on 5 February 2014 at the age of 82.
