= Qaleh Juq =

Qaleh Juq or Qalah Juq or Ghaleh Joogh or Qaleh Jaq or Qaleh Joq or Qaleh Jokh or Qaleh Jogh, Qaleh Jukh, Qaleh-ye Joq or Qaleh-ye Juq or Ghaleh Jogh (Persian: قلعه جوق) may refer to:

== Ardabil Province ==
- Qaleh Juq, Kowsar, Ardabil Province
- Qaleh Juq, Nir, Ardabil Province
- Qaleh Juq-e Sabalan, Ardabil Province

== East Azerbaijan Province ==
- Qaleh Juq, Ahar, East Azerbaijan Province
- Qaleh Juq, Hashtrud, East Azerbaijan Province
- Qaleh Juq, Malekan, East Azerbaijan Province
- Qaleh Juq, Meyaneh, East Azerbaijan Province
- Qaleh Juq, Sarab, East Azerbaijan Province
- Qaleh Juq-e Olya, East Azerbaijan Province
- Qaleh Juq-e Sofla, East Azerbaijan Province

== Hamadan Province ==
- Qaleh Juq, Hamadan
- Qaleh Juq, Razan, Hamadan Province

== Ilam Province ==
- Qaleh Juq, Ilam

== Kurdistan Province ==
- Qaleh Juq, Kurdistan, a village in Sanandaj County

== Kermanshah Province ==
- Qaleh Juq, Kermanshah

== North Khorasan Province ==
- Qaleh Juq-e Bozorg
- Qaleh Juq-e Kuchak
- Shahrak-e Qaleh Juq-e Bozorg

== Qazvin Province ==
- Qaleh Juq, Qazvin

== Razavi Khorasan Province ==
- Qaleh Juq, Razavi Khorasan

== West Azerbaijan Province ==
- Qaleh Juq, Maku, West Azerbaijan Province
- Qaleh Juq, Bazargan, Maku County, West Azerbaijan Province
- Qaleh Juq, Naqadeh, West Azerbaijan Province
- Qaleh Juq, Poldasht, West Azerbaijan Province
- Qaleh Juq, Takab, West Azerbaijan Province
- Qaleh Juq, Urmia, West Azerbaijan Province

== Zanjan Province ==
- Qaleh Juq, Khodabandeh, Zanjan Province
- Qaleh Juq, Mahneshan, Zanjan Province
- Qaleh Juq, Tarom, Zanjan Province
- Qaleh Juq-e Sadat, Zanjan Province
- Qaleh Juq-e Siah Mansur, Zanjan Province
- Qaleh Juq Rural District, in Zanjan Province

== See also ==
- Qaleh Jiq (disambiguation)
