= Bazargan =

Bazargan (Persian: بازرگان) may refer to:

== Places ==
- Bazargan, Afghanistan
- Bazargan, Chaharmahal and Bakhtiari, a village in Chaharmahal and Bakhtiari Province, Iran
- Bazargan, Darab, a village in Fars Province, Iran
- Bazargan, Iran, a city in West Azerbaijan Province, Iran
- Bazargan, Piranshahr, a village in West Azerbaijan Province, Iran
- Bazargan, Qazvin, a village in Qazvin Province, Iran
- Bazargan District, Iran

== People with the surname ==
- Abolfazl Bazargan, Iranian activist and politician
- Mehdi Bazargan (1907–1995), Iranian scholar and politician
