= Hasulazgi =

Hasulazgi حسولزگي
- Village
- Location within Iran
- Coordinates: 39°27′58″N 44°39′08″E
- Country: Iran
- Province: West Azerbaijan
- County: Maku
- Bakhsh: Central
- Rural District: Chaybasar-e Jonubi

Population (2006)
  - Total: 84
- Time zone: UTC+3:30 (IRST)
  - Summer (DST): UTC+4:30 (IRDT)

Hasulazgi (Persian: حسولزگي, also Romanized as Ḩasūlazgī; also known as Ḩasūlazgū) is a village in Chaybasar-e Jonubi Rural District, in the Central District of Maku County, West Azerbaijan Province, Iran. At the 2006 census, its population was 84, in 16 families.
