= Dim Qeshlaq-e Olya =

Village in West Azerbaijan province, Iran

Dim Qeshlaq-e Olya Persian: ديم قشلاق عليا
- Village
- Location within Iran
- Coordinates: 39°36′52″N 44°47′15″E
- Country: Iran
- Province: West Azerbaijan
- County: Maku
- District: Central
- Rural District: Qarah Su

Population (2016)
  - Total: 1,015
- Time zone: UTC+3:30 (IRST)

Dim Qeshlaq-e Olya (Persian: ديم قشلاق عليا) (Note: Also romanized as Dīm Qeshlāq-e ‘Olyā; also known as Dem, Dem Qeshlāq, and Dīm Qeshlāq) is a village in, and the capital of, Qarah Su Rural District in the Central District of Maku County, West Azerbaijan province, Iran.

== Demographics ==
=== Population ===
At the time of the 2006 National Census, the village's population was 1,056 in 196 households, when it was in Chaybasar-e Shomali Rural District. The following census in 2011 counted 1,167 people in 231 households, by which time the village had been transferred to Qarah Su Rural District created in the same district. The 2016 census measured the population of the village as 1,015 people in 233 households. It was the most populous village in its rural district.

== Notable persons ==
- Zeynab Jalaliyan (born 1982), Kurdish prisoner, initially sentenced to death for "enmity against God" (moharebeh) due to alleged political alignment with Kurdish groups, held in Yazd Central Prison since 2008
