= Tikmah Ajam =

Tikmah Ajam تيكمه عجم
- Village
- Location within Iran
- Coordinates: 39°13′44″N 44°32′08″E
- Country: Iran
- Province: West Azerbaijan
- County: Maku
- Bakhsh: Central
- Rural District: Qaleh Darrehsi

Population (2006)
  - Total: 130
- Time zone: UTC+3:30 (IRST)
  - Summer (DST): UTC+4:30 (IRDT)

Tikmah Ajam (Persian: تيكمه عجم, also Romanized as Tīkmah ‘Ajam) is a village in Qaleh Darrehsi Rural District, in the Central District of Maku County, West Azerbaijan Province, Iran. At the 2006 census, its population was 130, in 30 families.
