= Quchali =

Village in West Azerbaijan province, Iran

Quchali Persian: قوچعلي
- Village
- Location within Iran
- Coordinates: 39°39′44″N 44°44′37″E
- Country: Iran
- Province: West Azerbaijan
- County: Maku
- District: Central
- Rural District: Qarah Su

Population (2016)
  - Total: 122
- Time zone: UTC+3:30 (IRST)

Quchali (Persian: قوچعلي) (Note: Also romanized as Qūch‘alī) is a village in Qarah Su Rural District of the Central District in Maku County, West Azerbaijan province, Iran.

== Demographics ==
=== Population ===
At the time of the 2006 National Census, the village's population was 145 in 27 households, when it was in Chaybasar-e Shomali Rural District. The following census in 2011 counted 134 people in 23 households, by which time the village had been transferred to Qarah Su Rural District created in the same district. The 2016 census measured the population of the village as 122 people in 29 households.
