= Alu Hajju =

Village in West Azerbaijan province, Iran

Alu Hajju Persian: علوحاجي
- Village
- Location within Iran
- Coordinates: 39°37′12″N 44°33′01″E
- Country: Iran
- Province: West Azerbaijan
- County: Maku
- District: Bazargan
- Rural District: Chaybasar-e Shomali

Population (2016)
  - Total: 276
- Time zone: UTC+3:30 (IRST)

Alu Hajju (Persian: علوحاجي) (Note: Also romanized as ‘Alū Ḩājjū; also known as Alī Hājī, ‘Alī Ḩājjī, and ‘Alī Ḩājjū) is a village in Chaybasar-e Shomali Rural District of Bazargan District in Maku County, West Azerbaijan province, Iran.

== Demographics ==
=== Population ===
At the time of the 2006 National Census, the village's population was 295 in 52 households, when it was in the Central District. The following census in 2011 counted 277 people in 63 households, by which time the rural district had been separated from the district in the formation of Bazargan District. The 2016 census measured the population of the village as 276 people in 70 households.
