= Mahmud Aghli =

Mahmud Aghli محموداغلي
- Village
- Location within Iran
- Coordinates: 39°23′04″N 44°40′42″E
- Country: Iran
- Province: West Azerbaijan
- County: Maku
- Bakhsh: Central
- Rural District: Chaybasar-e Jonubi

Population (2006)
  - Total: 76
- Time zone: UTC+3:30 (IRST)
  - Summer (DST): UTC+4:30 (IRDT)

Mahmud Aghli (Persian: محموداغلي, also Romanized as Maḩmūd Āghlī; also known as Maḩmūd Āghol) is a village in Chaybasar-e Jonubi Rural District, in the Central District of Maku County, West Azerbaijan Province, Iran. At the 2006 census, its population was 76, in 17 families.
