= Gol Ali =

Village in West Azerbaijan province, Iran

Gol Ali Persian: گل عالي
- Village
- Location within Iran
- Coordinates: 39°35′01″N 44°29′07″E
- Country: Iran
- Province: West Azerbaijan
- County: Maku
- District: Bazargan
- Rural District: Chaybasar-e Shomali

Population (2016)
  - Total: 244
- Time zone: UTC+3:30 (IRST)

Gol Ali (Persian: گل عالي) (Note: Also romanized as Gol ‘Ālī; also known as Gol‘āleh) is a village in Chaybasar-e Shomali Rural District of Bazargan District in Maku County, West Azerbaijan province, Iran.

== Demographics ==
=== Population ===
At the time of the 2006 National Census, the village's population was 186 in 38 households, when it was in the Central District. The following census in 2011 counted 209 people in 48 households, by which time the rural district had been separated from the district in the formation of Bazargan District. The 2016 census measured the population of the village as 244 people in 89 households.
