= Qarah Qowyun =

Village in West Azerbaijan province, Iran

Qarah Qowyun Persian: قره قويون
- Village
- Location within Iran
- Coordinates: 39°35′57″N 44°51′28″E
- Country: Iran
- Province: West Azerbaijan
- County: Maku
- District: Central
- Rural District: Qarah Su

Population (2016)
  - Total: 288
- Time zone: UTC+3:30 (IRST)

Qarah Qowyun (Persian: قره قويون) (Note: Also romanized as Qarah Qowyūn) is a village in Qarah Su Rural District of the Central District in Maku County, West Azerbaijan province, Iran.

== Demographics ==
=== Population ===
At the time of the 2006 National Census, the village's population was 319 in 52 households, when it was in Chaybasar-e Shomali Rural District. The following census in 2011 counted 322 people in 64 households, by which time the village had been transferred to Qarah Su Rural District created in the same district. The 2016 census measured the population of the village as 288 people in 61 households.
