= Shuraq Gol =

Village in West Azerbaijan province, Iran

Shuraq Gol Persian: شوراق گل
- Village
- Location within Iran
- Coordinates: 39°33′47″N 44°43′06″E
- Country: Iran
- Province: West Azerbaijan
- County: Maku
- District: Central
- Rural District: Qarah Su

Population (2016)
  - Total: 184
- Time zone: UTC+3:30 (IRST)

Shuraq Gol (Persian: شوراق گل) (Note: Also romanized as Shūrāq Gol; also known as Shūrāghol) is a village in Qarah Su Rural District of the Central District in Maku County, West Azerbaijan province, Iran.

== Demographics ==
=== Population ===
At the time of the 2006 National Census, the village's population was 167 in 31 households, when it was in Chaybasar-e Shomali Rural District. The following census in 2011 counted 194 people in 36 households, by which time the village had been transferred to Qarah Su Rural District created in the same district. The 2016 census measured the population of the village as 184 people in 36 households.
