= Agh Gol =

Village in West Azerbaijan province, Iran

Agh Gol Persian: اغگل
- Village
- Location within Iran
- Coordinates: 39°33′06″N 44°44′26″E
- Country: Iran
- Province: West Azerbaijan
- County: Maku
- District: Central
- Rural District: Qarah Su

Population (2016)
  - Total: 796
- Time zone: UTC+3:30 (IRST)

Agh Gol (Persian: اغگل) (Note: Also romanized as Āgh Gol) is a village in Qarah Su Rural District of the Central District in Maku County, West Azerbaijan province, Iran.

== Demographics ==
=== Population ===
At the time of the 2006 National Census, the village's population was 1,034 in 182 households, when it was in Chaybasar-e Shomali Rural District. The following census in 2011 counted 1,067 people in 221 households, by which time the village had been transferred to Qarah Su Rural District created in the same district. The 2016 census measured the population of the village as 796 people in 185 households.
