= Surik =

Village in West Azerbaijan province, Iran

Surik Persian: سوريك
- Village
- Location within Iran
- Coordinates: 39°36′00″N 44°32′16″E
- Country: Iran
- Province: West Azerbaijan
- County: Maku
- District: Bazargan
- Rural District: Chaybasar-e Shomali

Population (2016)
  - Total: 246
- Time zone: UTC+3:30 (IRST)

Surik (Persian: سوريك) (Note: Also romanized as Sūrīk; also known as Qezel Yīnīsh (قزل ينيش)) is a village in Chaybasar-e Shomali Rural District of Bazargan District in Maku County, West Azerbaijan province, Iran.

== Demographics ==
=== Population ===
At the time of the 2006 National Census, the village's population was 278 in 47 households, when it was in the Central District. The following census in 2011 counted 292 people in 64 households, by which time the rural district had been separated from the district in the formation of Bazargan District. The 2016 census measured the population of the village as 246 people in 56 households.
