= Hasushiri =

Hasushiri حسوشيري
- Village
- Location within Iran
- Coordinates: 39°20′54″N 44°26′34″E
- Country: Iran
- Province: West Azerbaijan
- County: Maku
- Bakhsh: Central
- Rural District: Qaleh Darrehsi

Population (2006)
  - Total: 91
- Time zone: UTC+3:30 (IRST)
  - Summer (DST): UTC+4:30 (IRDT)

Hasushiri (Persian: حسوشيري, also Romanized as Ḩasūshīrī) is a village in Qaleh Darrehsi Rural District, in the Central District of Maku County, West Azerbaijan Province, Iran. At the 2006 census, its population was 91, in 18 families.
