= Abdollah Kandi =

Abdollah Kandi عبداله كندي
- Village
- Location within Iran
- Country: Iran
- Province: West Azerbaijan
- County: Maku
- Bakhsh: Central
- Rural District: Chaybasar-e Jonubi

Population (2006)
  - Total: 22
- Time zone: UTC+3:30 (IRST)
  - Summer (DST): UTC+4:30 (IRDT)

Abdollah Kandi (Persian: عبداله كندي, also Romanized as ʿAbdollah Kandī) is a village in Chaybasar-e Jonubi Rural District, in the Central District of Maku County, West Azerbaijan Province, Iran. At the 2006 census, its population was 22, in 4 families.
