= Beri, Iran =

Village in West Azerbaijan province, Iran

Beri Persian: بري
- Village
- Location within Iran
- Coordinates: 39°42′45″N 44°38′33″E
- Country: Iran
- Province: West Azerbaijan
- County: Maku
- District: Bazargan
- Rural District: Chaybasar-e Shomali

Population (2016)
  - Total: 724
- Time zone: UTC+3:30 (IRST)

Beri (Persian: بري) (Note: Also romanized as Berī) is a village in Chaybasar-e Shomali Rural District of Bazargan District in Maku County, West Azerbaijan province, Iran.

== Demographics ==
=== Population ===
At the time of the 2006 National Census, the village's population was 663 in 113 households, when it was in the Central District. The following census in 2011 counted 719 people in 164 households, by which time the rural district had been separated from the district in the formation of Bazargan District. The 2016 census measured the population of the village as 724 people in 179 households.
