= Gerik, West Azerbaijan =

Village in West Azerbaijan province, Iran

Gerik Persian: گريك
- Village
- Location within Iran
- Coordinates: 39°33′02″N 44°27′45″E
- Country: Iran
- Province: West Azerbaijan
- County: Maku
- District: Bazargan
- Rural District: Chaybasar-e Shomali

Population (2016)
  - Total: 212
- Time zone: UTC+3:30 (IRST)

Gerik (Persian: گريك) (Note: Also romanized as Garīk and Gerik; also known as Gejeh Qeshlāq, Gijo Qishlāq, Qeshlāq Jījū, Qeshlāq-e Garīg, and Qeshlāq-e Jījū) is a village in Chaybasar-e Shomali Rural District of Bazargan District in Maku County, West Azerbaijan province, Iran.

== Demographics ==
=== Population ===
At the time of the 2006 National Census, the village's population was 230 in 39 households, when it was in the Central District. The following census in 2011 counted 273 people in 58 households, by which time the rural district had been separated from the district in the formation of Bazargan District. The 2016 census measured the population of the village as 212 people in 54 households.
