= Ali Qandu =

Ali Qandu علی‌قندو
- Village
- Location within Iran
- Coordinates: 39°22′13″N 44°34′25″E
- Country: Iran
- Province: West Azerbaijan
- County: Maku
- Bakhsh: Central
- Rural District: Chaybasar-e Jonubi

Population (2006)
  - Total: 179
- Time zone: UTC+3:30 (IRST)
  - Summer (DST): UTC+4:30 (IRDT)

Ali Qandu (Persian: علی‌قندو, also Romanized as ‘Alī Qandū; also known as ‘Alī Qandū-ye ‘Olyā) is a village in Chaybasar-e Jonubi Rural District, in the Central District of Maku County, West Azerbaijan Province, Iran. At the 2006 census, its population was 179, in 31 families.
