= Hasushaki =

Hasushaki حسوشكي
- Village
- Location within Iran
- Coordinates: 39°28′52″N 44°37′35″E
- Country: Iran
- Province: West Azerbaijan
- County: Maku
- Bakhsh: Central
- Rural District: Chaybasar-e Jonubi

Population (2006)
  - Total: 165
- Time zone: UTC+3:30 (IRST)
  - Summer (DST): UTC+4:30 (IRDT)

Hasushaki (Persian: حسوشكي, also Romanized as Ḩasūshakī) is a village in Chaybasar-e Jonubi Rural District, in the Central District of Maku County, West Azerbaijan Province, Iran. At the 2006 census, its population was 165, in 31 families.
