= Tajdu =

Tajdu تاجدو
- Village
- Location within Iran
- Coordinates: 39°34′41″N 44°31′49″E
- Country: Iran
- Province: West Azerbaijan
- County: Maku
- Bakhsh: Bazargan
- Rural District: Chaybasar-e Shomali

Population (2006)
  - Total: 114
- Time zone: UTC+3:30 (IRST)
  - Summer (DST): UTC+4:30 (IRDT)

Tajdu (Persian: تاجدو, also Romanized as Tājdū) is a village in Chaybasar-e Shomali Rural District, Bazargan District, Maku County, West Azerbaijan Province, Iran. At the 2006 census, its population was 114, in 18 families.
