= Haju =

Village in West Azerbaijan province, Iran

Haju Persian: حاجو
- Village
- Location within Iran
- Coordinates: 39°32′47″N 44°31′31″E
- Country: Iran
- Province: West Azerbaijan
- County: Maku
- District: Bazargan
- Rural District: Chaybasar-e Shomali

Population (2016)
  - Total: 249
- Time zone: UTC+3:30 (IRST)

Haju (Persian: حاجو) (Note: Also romanized as Ḩājjū and Ḩājū) is a village in Chaybasar-e Shomali Rural District of Bazargan District in Maku County, West Azerbaijan province, Iran.

== Demographics ==
=== Population ===
At the time of the 2006 National Census, the village's population was 256 in 42 households, when it was in the Central District. The following census in 2011 counted 260 people in 58 households, by which time the rural district had been separated from the district in the formation of Bazargan District. The 2016 census measured the population of the village as 249 people in 66 households.
