= Molla Hasan, West Azerbaijan =

Village in West Azerbaijan province, Iran

Molla Hasan Persian: ملاحسن
- Village
- Location within Iran
- Coordinates: 39°35′29″N 44°44′30″E
- Country: Iran
- Province: West Azerbaijan
- County: Maku
- District: Central
- Rural District: Qarah Su

Population (2016)
  - Total: 219
- Time zone: UTC+3:30 (IRST)

Molla Hasan (Persian: ملاحسن) (Note: Also romanized as Mollā Ḩasan) is a village in Qarah Su Rural District of the Central District in Maku County, West Azerbaijan province, Iran.

== Demographics ==
=== Population ===
At the time of the 2006 National Census, the village's population was 364 in 57 households, when it was in Chaybasar-e Shomali Rural District. The following census in 2011 counted 276 people in 53 households, by which time the village had been transferred to Qarah Su Rural District created in the same district. The 2016 census measured the population of the village as 276 people in 53 households.
