= Qaderqamu =

Village in West Azerbaijan province, Iran

Qaderqamu Persian: قادرقامو
- Village
- Country: Iran
- Province: West Azerbaijan
- County: Maku
- District: Central
- Rural District: Qarah Su

Population (2016)
  - Total: 0
- Time zone: UTC+3:30 (IRST)

Qaderqamu (Persian: قادرقامو) (Note: Also romanized as Qāderqāmū) is a village in Qarah Su Rural District of the Central District in Maku County, West Azerbaijan province, Iran.

== Demographics ==
=== Population ===
At the time of the 2006 National Census, the village's population was 25 in seven households, when it was in Chaybasar-e Shomali Rural District. The following census in 2011 counted a population below the reporting threshold, by which time the village had been transferred to Qarah Su Rural District created in the same district. The 2016 census measured the population of the village as zero.
