= Isa Kandi =

Village in West Azerbaijan province, Iran

Isa Kandi Persian: عيسي كندي
- Village
- Location within Iran
- Coordinates: 39°35′52″N 44°50′03″E
- Country: Iran
- Province: West Azerbaijan
- County: Maku
- District: Central
- Rural District: Qarah Su

Population (2016)
  - Total: 289
- Time zone: UTC+3:30 (IRST)

Isa Kandi (Persian: عيسي كندي) (Note: Also romanized as ‘Īsá Kandī; also known as Qarah Dāghlī (قره داغلي)) is a village in Qarah Su Rural District of the Central District in Maku County, West Azerbaijan province, Iran.

== Demographics ==
=== Population ===
At the time of the 2006 National Census, the village's population was 385 in 66 households, when it was in Chaybasar-e Shomali Rural District. The following census in 2011 counted 312 people in 62 households, by which time the village had been transferred to Qarah Su Rural District created in the same district. The 2016 census measured the population of the village as 289 people in 58 households.
