= Marakami =

Marakami ماراكمي
- Village
- Location within Iran
- Coordinates: 39°21′52″N 44°19′24″E
- Country: Iran
- Province: West Azerbaijan
- County: Maku
- Bakhsh: Central
- Rural District: Qaleh Darrehsi

Population (2006)
  - Total: 175
- Time zone: UTC+3:30 (IRST)
  - Summer (DST): UTC+4:30 (IRDT)

Marakami (Persian: ماراكمي, also Romanized as Mārākamī; also known as Mārākūmī) is a village in Qaleh Darrehsi Rural District, in the Central District of Maku County, West Azerbaijan Province, Iran. At the 2006 census, its population was 175, in 34 families.
