= Qush, West Azerbaijan =

Village in West Azerbaijan province, Iran

Qush Persian: قوش
- Village
- Location within Iran
- Coordinates: 39°44′53″N 44°37′25″E
- Country: Iran
- Province: West Azerbaijan
- County: Maku
- District: Bazargan
- Rural District: Chaybasar-e Shomali

Population (2016)
  - Total: 443
- Time zone: UTC+3:30 (IRST)

Qush (Persian: قوش) (Note: Also romanized as Qūsh) is a village in, and the capital of, Chaybasar-e Shomali Rural District in Bazargan District of Maku County, West Azerbaijan province, Iran.

== Demographics ==
=== Population ===
At the time of the 2006 National Census, the village's population was 416 in 70 households, when it was in the Central District. The following census in 2011 counted 423 people in 86 households, by which time the rural district had been separated from the district in the formation of Bazargan District. The 2016 census measured the population of the village as 443 people in 100 households.
