= Qeshlaq-e Bahluleh =

Village in West Azerbaijan province, Iran

Qeshlaq-e Bahluleh Persian: قشلاق بهلوله
- Village
- Location within Iran
- Coordinates: 39°39′17″N 44°46′17″E
- Country: Iran
- Province: West Azerbaijan
- County: Maku
- District: Central
- Rural District: Qarah Su

Population (2016)
  - Total: 202
- Time zone: UTC+3:30 (IRST)

Qeshlaq-e Bahluleh (Persian: قشلاق بهلوله) (Note: Also romanized as Qeshlāq-e Bahlūleh; also known as Bahlūleh) is a village in Qarah Su Rural District of the Central District in Maku County, West Azerbaijan province, Iran.

== Demographics ==
=== Population ===
At the time of the 2006 National Census, the village's population was 238 in 50 households, when it was in Chaybasar-e Shomali Rural District. The following census in 2011 counted 215 people in 43 households, by which time the village had been transferred to Qarah Su Rural District created in the same district. The 2016 census measured the population of the village as 202 people in 50 households.
