= Khalkhaleh =

Village in West Azerbaijan province, Iran

Khalkhaleh Persian: خلخله
- Village
- Location within Iran
- Coordinates: 39°40′40″N 44°44′45″E
- Country: Iran
- Province: West Azerbaijan
- County: Maku
- District: Central
- Rural District: Qarah Su

Population (2016)
  - Total: 493
- Time zone: UTC+3:30 (IRST)

Khalkhaleh (Persian: خلخله) is a village in Qarah Su Rural District of the Central District in Maku County, West Azerbaijan province, Iran.

== Demographics ==
=== Population ===
At the time of the 2006 National Census, the village's population was 405 in 80 households, when it was in Chaybasar-e Shomali Rural District. The following census in 2011 counted 603 people in 127 households, by which time the village had been transferred to Qarah Su Rural District created in the same district. The 2016 census measured the population of the village as 493 people in 129 households.
