= Qom Qeshlaq =

Village in West Azerbaijan province, Iran

Qom Qeshlaq Persian: قم قشلاق
- Village
- Location within Iran
- Coordinates: 39°34′33″N 44°44′01″E
- Country: Iran
- Province: West Azerbaijan
- County: Maku
- District: Central
- Rural District: Qarah Su

Population (2016)
  - Total: 490
- Time zone: UTC+3:30 (IRST)

Qom Qeshlaq (Persian: قم قشلاق) (Note: Also romanized as Qom Qeshlāq) is a village in Qarah Su Rural District of the Central District in Maku County, West Azerbaijan province, Iran.

== Demographics ==
=== Population ===
At the time of the 2006 National Census, the village's population was 509 in 81 households, when it was in Chaybasar-e Shomali Rural District. The following census in 2011 counted 555 people in 117 households, by which time the village had been transferred to Qarah Su Rural District created in the same district. The 2016 census measured the population of the village as 490 people in 122 households.
