= Panjarlu =

Village in West Azerbaijan province, Iran

Panjarlu Persian: پنجرلو
- Village
- Location within Iran
- Coordinates: 39°43′33″N 44°37′59″E
- Country: Iran
- Province: West Azerbaijan
- County: Maku
- District: Bazargan
- Rural District: Chaybasar-e Shomali

Population (2016)
  - Total: 768
- Time zone: UTC+3:30 (IRST)

Panjarlu (Persian: پنجرلو) (Note: Also romanized as Panjarlū) is a village in Chaybasar-e Shomali Rural District of Bazargan District in Maku County, West Azerbaijan province, Iran.

== Demographics ==
=== Population ===
At the time of the 2006 National Census, the village's population was 740 in 118 households, when it was in the Central District. The following census in 2011 counted 795 people in 157 households, by which time the rural district had been separated from the district in the formation of Bazargan District. The 2016 census measured the population of the village as 768 people in 206 households. It was the most populous village in its rural district.
