= Sarenj =

Village in West Azerbaijan province, Iran

Sarenj Persian: سارنج
- Village
- Location within Iran
- Coordinates: 39°35′26″N 44°46′21″E
- Country: Iran
- Province: West Azerbaijan
- County: Maku
- District: Central
- Rural District: Qarah Su

Population (2016)
  - Total: 79
- Time zone: UTC+3:30 (IRST)

Sarenj (Persian: سارنج) (Note: Also romanized as Sārenj) is a village in Qarah Su Rural District of the Central District in Maku County, West Azerbaijan province, Iran.

== Demographics ==
=== Population ===
At the time of the 2006 National Census, the village's population was 86 in 20 households, when it was in Chaybasar-e Shomali Rural District. The following census in 2011 counted 74 people in 17 households, by which time the village had been transferred to Qarah Su Rural District created in the same district. The 2016 census measured the population of the village as 79 people in 17 households.
