= Gamus =

Gamus گاموس
- Village
- Location within Iran
- Coordinates: 39°18′41″N 44°34′51″E
- Country: Iran
- Province: West Azerbaijan
- County: Maku
- Bakhsh: Central
- Rural District: Chaybasar-e Jonubi

Population (2006)
  - Total: 49
- Time zone: UTC+3:30 (IRST)
  - Summer (DST): UTC+4:30 (IRDT)

Gamus (Persian: گاموس, also Romanized as Gāmūs; also known as Jāmūs) is a village in Chaybasar-e Jonubi Rural District, in the Central District of Maku County, West Azerbaijan Province, Iran. At the 2006 census, its population was 49, in 10 families.
