= Qeshlaq-e Namu =

Qeshlaq-e Namu قشلاق نعمو
- Village
- Country: Iran
- Province: West Azerbaijan
- County: Maku
- Bakhsh: Bazargan
- Rural District: Chaybasar-e Shomali

Population (2006)
  - Total: 46
- Time zone: UTC+3:30 (IRST)
  - Summer (DST): UTC+4:30 (IRDT)

Qeshlaq-e Namu (Persian: قشلاق نعمو, also Romanized as Qeshlāq-e Naʿmū) is a village in Chaybasar-e Shomali Rural District, Bazargan District, Maku County, West Azerbaijan Province, Iran. At the 2006 census, its population was 46, in 7 families.
