= Khezr Qeshlaq =

Village in West Azerbaijan province, Iran

Khezr Qeshlaq Persian: خزرقشلاق
- Village
- Country: Iran
- Province: West Azerbaijan
- County: Maku
- District: Central
- Rural District: Qarah Su

Population (2016)
  - Total: 276
- Time zone: UTC+3:30 (IRST)

Khezr Qeshlaq (Persian: خزرقشلاق) (Note: Also romanized as Khezr Qeshlāq) is a village in Qarah Su Rural District of the Central District in Maku County, West Azerbaijan province, Iran.

== Demographics ==
=== Population ===
At the time of the 2006 National Census, the village's population was 326 in 60 households, when it was in Chaybasar-e Shomali Rural District. The following census in 2011 counted 325 people in 62 households, by which time the village had been transferred to Qarah Su Rural District created in the same district. The 2016 census measured the population of the village as 276 people in 60 households.
