= Gedai, West Azerbaijan =

Gedai گدائي
- Village
- Location within Iran
- Coordinates: 39°35′52″N 44°33′53″E
- Country: Iran
- Province: West Azerbaijan
- County: Maku
- Bakhsh: Bazargan
- Rural District: Chaybasar-e Shomali

Population (2006)
  - Total: 71
- Time zone: UTC+3:30 (IRST)
  - Summer (DST): UTC+4:30 (IRDT)

Gedai (Persian: گدائي, also Romanized as Gedā'ī and Gedāy) is a village in Chaybasar-e Shomali Rural District, Bazargan District, Maku County, West Azerbaijan Province, Iran. At the 2006 census, its population was 71, in 12 families.
