= Jaganluy-e Kord =

Village in West Azerbaijan province, Iran

Jaganluy-e Kord Persian: جگن لوي كرد
- Village
- Location within Iran
- Coordinates: 39°18′19″N 44°43′34″E
- Country: Iran
- Province: West Azerbaijan
- County: Maku
- District: Central
- Rural District: Chaybasar-e Jonubi

Population (2016)
  - Total: 358
- Time zone: UTC+3:30 (IRST)

Jaganluy-e Kord (Persian: جگن لوي كرد) (Note: Also romanized as Jaganlūy-e Kord; also known as Jagan-e Kord and Jaganlū-ye Kord) is a village in Chaybasar-e Jonubi Rural District of the Central District in Maku County, West Azerbaijan province, Iran.

== Demographics ==
=== Population ===
At the time of the 2006 National Census, the village's population was 382 in 70 households. The following census in 2011 counted 409 people in 77 households. The 2016 census measured the population of the village as 358 people in 91 households.
