= Kusaj, West Azerbaijan =

Village in West Azerbaijan province, Iran

Kusaj Persian: كوسج
- Village
- Location within Iran
- Coordinates: 39°18′14″N 44°23′38″E
- Country: Iran
- Province: West Azerbaijan
- County: Maku
- District: Central
- Rural District: Qaleh Darrehsi

Population (2016)
  - Total: 375
- Time zone: UTC+3:30 (IRST)

Kusaj (Persian: كوسج) (Note: Also romanized as Kūsaj; also known as Kuseh Kandi (كوسه كندي), also romanized as Kūseh Kandī) is a village in Qaleh Darrehsi Rural District of the Central District in Maku County, West Azerbaijan province, Iran.

== Demographics ==
=== Population ===
At the time of the 2006 National Census, the village's population (as Kuseh Kandi) was 425 in 87 households. The following census in 2011 counted 378 people in 103 households, by which time the village was listed as Kusaj. The 2016 census measured the population of the village as 375 people in 121 households.
