= Ilan Qarah =

Ilan Qarah or Ilanqarah (Persian: ايلان قره) may refer to:

- Ilan Qarah-ye Olya
- Ilan Qarah-ye Sofla
