= Adaghan =

Village in West Azerbaijan province, Iran

Adaghan Persian: اداغان
- Village
- Location within Iran
- Coordinates: 39°24′49″N 44°36′07″E
- Country: Iran
- Province: West Azerbaijan
- County: Maku
- District: Central
- Rural District: Chaybasar-e Jonubi

Population (2016)
  - Total: 1,162
- Time zone: UTC+3:30 (IRST)

Adaghan (Persian: اداغان) (Note: Also romanized as Ādāghān) is a village in Chaybasar-e Jonubi Rural District of the Central District in Maku County, West Azerbaijan province, Iran.

== Demographics ==
=== Population ===
At the time of the 2006 National Census, the village's population was 1,043 in 198 households. The following census in 2011 counted 1,023 people in 242 households. The 2016 census measured the population of the village as 1,162 people in 298 households. It was the most populous village in its rural district.
