= Mirza Dulmaz =

Mirza Dulmaz ميرزادولماز
- Village
- Location within Iran
- Coordinates: 39°22′00″N 44°43′00″E
- Country: Iran
- Province: West Azerbaijan
- County: Maku
- Bakhsh: Central
- Rural District: Chaybasar-e Jonubi

Population (2006)
  - Total: 21
- Time zone: UTC+3:30 (IRST)
  - Summer (DST): UTC+4:30 (IRDT)

Mirza Dulmaz (Persian: ميرزادولماز, also Romanized as Mīrzā Dūlmāz; also known as Tūzū) is a village in Chaybasar-e Jonubi Rural District, in the Central District of Maku County, West Azerbaijan Province, Iran. At the 2006 census, its population was 21, in 5 families.
