= Yaqub Ali Kandi =

Village in West Azerbaijan province, Iran

Yaqub Ali Kandi Persian: يعقوبعلي كندي
- Village
- Location within Iran
- Coordinates: 39°17′25″N 44°40′01″E
- Country: Iran
- Province: West Azerbaijan
- County: Maku
- District: Central
- Rural District: Chaybasar-e Jonubi

Population (2016)
  - Total: 416
- Time zone: UTC+3:30 (IRST)

Yaqub Ali Kandi (Persian: يعقوبعلي كندي) (Note: Also romanized as Ya‘qūb ‘Alī Kandī and Ya‘qūb‘alī Kandī) is a village in Chaybasar-e Jonubi Rural District of the Central District in Maku County, West Azerbaijan province, Iran.

== Demographics ==
=== Population ===
At the time of the 2006 National Census, the village's population was 367 in 58 households. The following census in 2011 counted 365 people in 73 households. The 2016 census measured the population of the village as 416 people in 98 households.
