= Zel Keh =

Zel Keh (Persian: ذلكه), also rendered as Zilakeh, may refer to:

- Zel Keh-ye Olya
- Zel Keh-ye Sofla
