= Danaluy =

Danaluy (Persian: دانالوي) may refer to:

- Danaluy-e Bozorg
- Danaluy-e Kuchak
