= Vali Kandi, West Azerbaijan =

Village in West Azerbaijan province, Iran

Vali Kandi Persian: ولي كندي
- Village
- Location within Iran
- Coordinates: 39°44′12″N 44°37′46″E
- Country: Iran
- Province: West Azerbaijan
- County: Maku
- District: Bazargan
- Rural District: Chaybasar-e Shomali

Population (2016)
  - Total: 469
- Time zone: UTC+3:30 (IRST)

Vali Kandi (Persian: ولي كندي) (Note: Also romanized as Valī Kandī; also known as Qeshlaq-e-Vālī, Vali Kans, Vālī Qeshlāq, and Vali Qishlāq) is a village in Chaybasar-e Shomali Rural District of Bazargan District in Maku County, West Azerbaijan province, Iran.

== Demographics ==
=== Population ===
At the time of the 2006 National Census, the village's population was 426 in 63 households, when it was in the Central District. The following census in 2011 counted 427 people in 80 households, by which time the rural district had been separated from the district in the formation of Bazargan District. The 2016 census measured the population of the village as 469 people in 101 households.
