= Ilan Qarah-ye Sofla =

Ilan Qarah-ye Sofla ايلان قره سفلي
- Village
- Location within Iran
- Coordinates: 39°27′06″N 44°44′50″E
- Country: Iran
- Province: West Azerbaijan
- County: Maku
- Bakhsh: Central
- Rural District: Chaybasar-e Jonubi

Population (2006)
  - Total: 87
- Time zone: UTC+3:30 (IRST)
  - Summer (DST): UTC+4:30 (IRDT)

Ilan Qarah-ye Sofla (Persian: ايلان قره سفلي, also Romanized as Īlān Qarah-ye Soflá; also known as Īlānqarah-ye Pā'īn) is a village in Chaybasar-e Jonubi Rural District, in the Central District of Maku County, West Azerbaijan Province, Iran. At the 2006 census, its population was 87, in 18 families.
