= Qezel Arkh-e Sofla =

Village in West Azerbaijan province, Iran

Qezel Arkh-e Sofla Persian: قزل ارخ سفلي
- Village
- Location within Iran
- Coordinates: 39°34′29″N 44°51′44″E
- Country: Iran
- Province: West Azerbaijan
- County: Maku
- District: Central
- Rural District: Qarah Su

Population (2016)
  - Total: 89
- Time zone: UTC+3:30 (IRST)

Qezel Arkh-e Sofla (Persian: قزل ارخ سفلي) (Note: Also romanized as Qezel Ārkh-e Soflá; also known as Maḩmūd Kandī (محمودكندي) and Qezel Ārkh) is a village in Qarah Su Rural District of the Central District in Maku County, West Azerbaijan province, Iran.

== Demographics ==
=== Population ===
At the time of the 2006 National Census, the village's population was 506 in 80 households, when it was in Chaybasar-e Shomali Rural District. The following census in 2011 counted 95 people in 19 households, by which time the village had been transferred to Qarah Su Rural District created in the same district. The 2016 census measured the population of the village as 89 people in 16 households.
