= Bashkand, West Azerbaijan =

Village in West Azerbaijan province, Iran

Bashkand Persian: باش كند
- Village
- Location within Iran
- Coordinates: 39°20′58″N 44°20′35″E
- Country: Iran
- Province: West Azerbaijan
- County: Maku
- District: Central
- Rural District: Qaleh Darrehsi

Population (2016)
  - Total: 545
- Time zone: UTC+3:30 (IRST)

Bashkand (Persian: باش كند) (Note: Also romanized as Bāshkand) is a village in Qaleh Darrehsi Rural District of the Central District in Maku County, West Azerbaijan province, Iran.

== Demographics ==
=== Population ===
At the time of the 2006 National Census, the village's population was 403 in 90 households. The following census in 2011 counted 485 people in 129 households. The 2016 census measured the population of the village as 545 people in 151 households.
