= Hendvar =

Village in West Azerbaijan province, Iran

Hendvar Persian: هندور
- Village
- Location within Iran
- Coordinates: 39°16′11″N 44°36′51″E
- Country: Iran
- Province: West Azerbaijan
- County: Maku
- District: Central
- Rural District: Chaybasar-e Jonubi

Population (2016)
  - Total: 723
- Time zone: UTC+3:30 (IRST)

Hendvar (Persian: هندور) is a village in Chaybasar-e Jonubi Rural District of the Central District in Maku County, West Azerbaijan province, Iran.

== Demographics ==
=== Population ===
At the time of the 2006 National Census, the village's population was 667 in 164 households. The following census in 2011 counted 791 people in 217 households. The 2016 census measured the population of the village as 723 people in 223 households.
