= Gedai =

Gedai or Godayi or Geday (Persian: گدائي) may refer to:

- Gedai, Bushehr, Iran
- Gedai, West Azerbaijan, Iran
- Geday, West Azerbaijan, Iran
- Elisabeth Geday (born 1965), Danish politician
- Paul Geday, Egyptian publisher
