= Qaleh Jiq =

Qaleh Jiq (Persian: قلعه جيق) may refer to:

- Qaleh Jiq, East Azerbaijan
- Qaleh Jiq, Malekan, East Azerbaijan Province
- Qaleh Jiq, Golestan
- Qaleh Jiq-e Bozorg, Golestan Province
- Qaleh Jiq-e Kuchek, Golestan Province

== See also ==
- Qaleh Juq (disambiguation)
