= Qezel Dagh-e Ajam =

Village in West Azerbaijan province, Iran

Qezel Dagh-e Ajam Persian: قزل داغ عجم
- Village
- Location within Iran
- Coordinates: 39°15′55″N 44°39′06″E
- Country: Iran
- Province: West Azerbaijan
- County: Maku
- District: Central
- Rural District: Chaybasar-e Jonubi

Population (2016)
  - Total: 360
- Time zone: UTC+3:30 (IRST)

Qezel Dagh-e Ajam (Persian: قزل داغ عجم) (Note: Also romanized as Qezel Dāgh-e ‘Ajam and Qezeldāgh-e ‘Ajam) is a village in Chaybasar-e Jonubi Rural District of the Central District in Maku County, West Azerbaijan province, Iran.

== Demographics ==
=== Population ===
At the time of the 2006 National Census, the village's population was 359 in 79 households. The following census in 2011 counted 353 people in 96 households. The 2016 census measured the population of the village as 360 people in 114 households.
