= Hasin-e Kuchak =

Hasin-e Kuchak حاسين كوچك
- Village
- Location within Iran
- Coordinates: 39°23′01″N 44°38′24″E
- Country: Iran
- Province: West Azerbaijan
- County: Maku
- Bakhsh: Central
- Rural District: Chaybasar-e Jonubi

Population (2006)
  - Total: 204
- Time zone: UTC+3:30 (IRST)
  - Summer (DST): UTC+4:30 (IRDT)

Hasin-e Kuchak (Persian: حاسين كوچك, also Romanized as Hāsīn-e Kūchak; also known as Hāsūn-e Kūchak) is a village in Chaybasar-e Jonubi Rural District, in the Central District of Maku County, West Azerbaijan Province, Iran. At the 2006 census, its population was 204, in 33 families.
