= Vali Kandi =

Vali Kandi (Persian: ولي كندي) may refer to:

- Vali Kandi, East Azerbaijan
- Vali Kandi, West Azerbaijan
