= Qarah Tappeh, Maku =

Village in West Azerbaijan province, Iran

Qarah Tappeh Persian: قره‌تپه
- Village
- Location within Iran
- Coordinates: 39°19′06″N 44°39′37″E
- Country: Iran
- Province: West Azerbaijan
- County: Maku
- District: Central
- Rural District: Chaybasar-e Jonubi

Population (2016)
  - Total: 928
- Time zone: UTC+3:30 (IRST)

Qarah Tappeh (Persian: قره‌تپه) (Note: Also romanized as Qareh Tapeh and Qareh Tappeh; also known as Ghareh Tappeh, Kara Tepe, and Qar Tepe) is a village in, and the capital of, Chaybasar-e Jonubi Rural District in the Central District of Maku County, West Azerbaijan province, Iran.

== Demographics ==
=== Population ===
At the time of the 2006 National Census, the village's population was 874 in 218 households. The following census in 2011 counted 970 people in 272 households. The 2016 census measured the population of the village as 928 people in 276 households.
