= Sangar, Maku =

Village in West Azerbaijan province, Iran

Sangar Persian: سنگر
- Village
- Location within Iran
- Coordinates: 39°18′58″N 44°26′07″E
- Country: Iran
- Province: West Azerbaijan
- County: Maku
- District: Central
- Rural District: Qaleh Darrehsi

Population (2016)
  - Total: 780
- Time zone: UTC+3:30 (IRST)

Sangar (Persian: سنگر) is a village in Qaleh Darrehsi Rural District of the Central District in Maku County, West Azerbaijan province, Iran.

== Demographics ==
=== Population ===
At the time of the 2006 National Census, the village's population was 585 in 118 households. The following census in 2011 counted 651 people in 189 households. The 2016 census measured the population of the village as 780 people in 228 households.
