= Zel Keh-ye Olya =

Village in West Azerbaijan province, Iran

Zel Keh-ye Olya Persian: ذلكه عليا
- Village
- Location within Iran
- Coordinates: 39°36′11″N 44°48′35″E
- Country: Iran
- Province: West Azerbaijan
- County: Maku
- District: Central
- Rural District: Qarah Su

Population (2016)
  - Total: 623
- Time zone: UTC+3:30 (IRST)

Zel Keh-ye Olya (Persian: ذلكه عليا) (Note: Also romanized as Z̄el Keh-ye ‘Olyā; also known as Z̄īlakeh-ye ‘Olyā) is a village in Qarah Su Rural District of the Central District in Maku County, West Azerbaijan province, Iran.

== Demographics ==
=== Population ===
At the time of the 2006 National Census, the village's population was 750 in 134 households, when it was in Chaybasar-e Shomali Rural District. The following census in 2011 counted 635 people in 131 households, by which time the village had been transferred to Qarah Su Rural District created in the same district. The 2016 census measured the population of the village as 623 people in 144 households.
