= Zel Keh-ye Sofla =

Village in West Azerbaijan province, Iran

Zel Keh-ye Sofla Persian: ذلكه سفلي
- Village
- Location within Iran
- Coordinates: 39°36′01″N 44°49′51″E
- Country: Iran
- Province: West Azerbaijan
- County: Maku
- District: Central
- Rural District: Qarah Su

Population (2016)
  - Total: 177
- Time zone: UTC+3:30 (IRST)

Zel Keh-ye Sofla (Persian: ذلكه سفلي) (Note: Also romanized as Z̄el Keh-ye Soflá; also known as Z̄īlakeh-ye Soflá) is a village in Qarah Su Rural District of the Central District in Maku County, West Azerbaijan province, Iran.

== Demographics ==
=== Population ===
At the time of the 2006 National Census, the village's population was 235 in 49 households, when it was in Chaybasar-e Shomali Rural District. The following census in 2011 counted 232 people in 54 households, by which time the village had been transferred to Qarah Su Rural District created in the same district. The 2016 census measured the population of the village as 177 people in 47 households.
