= Ilan Qarah-ye Olya =

Ilan Qarah-ye Olya ايلان قره عليا
- Village
- Location within Iran
- Coordinates: 39°26′43″N 44°43′23″E
- Country: Iran
- Province: West Azerbaijan
- County: Maku
- Bakhsh: Central
- Rural District: Chaybasar-e Jonubi

Population (2006)
  - Total: 55
- Time zone: UTC+3:30 (IRST)
  - Summer (DST): UTC+4:30 (IRDT)

Ilan Qarah-ye Olya (Persian: ايلان قره عليا, also Romanized as Īlān Qarah-ye ‘Olyā; also known as Tāzeh Kand-e Īlān Qarah and Īlānqarah-ye Bālā) is a village in Chaybasar-e Jonubi Rural District, in the Central District of Maku County, West Azerbaijan Province, Iran. At the 2006 census, its population was 55, in 11 families.
