= Danaluy-e Kuchak =

Danaluy-e Kuchak دانالوي كوچك
- Village
- Location within Iran
- Coordinates: 39°20′34″N 44°32′29″E
- Country: Iran
- Province: West Azerbaijan
- County: Maku
- Bakhsh: Central
- Rural District: Qaleh Darrehsi

Population (2006)
  - Total: 186
- Time zone: UTC+3:30 (IRST)
  - Summer (DST): UTC+4:30 (IRDT)

Danaluy-e Kuchak (Persian: دانالوي كوچك, also Romanized as Dānālūy-e Kūchak; also known as Dānālū-ye Kūchak) is a village in Qaleh Darrehsi Rural District, in the Central District of Maku County, West Azerbaijan Province, Iran. At the 2006 census, its population was 186, in 45 families.
