= Zanganeh, West Azerbaijan =

Village in West Azerbaijan province, Iran

Zanganeh Persian: زنگنه
- Village
- Location within Iran
- Coordinates: 39°34′47″N 44°53′07″E
- Country: Iran
- Province: West Azerbaijan
- County: Maku
- District: Central
- Rural District: Qarah Su

Population (2016)
  - Total: 29
- Time zone: UTC+3:30 (IRST)

Zanganeh (Persian: زنگنه) (Note: Also known as Zangan and Zanjāneh) is a village in Qarah Su Rural District of the Central District in Maku County, West Azerbaijan province, Iran.

== Demographics ==
=== Population ===
At the time of the 2006 National Census, the village's population was 43 in 13 households, when it was in Chaybasar-e Sharqi Rural District of the Central District in Poldasht County. The following census in 2011 counted 100 people in 13 households, by which time the village had been transferred to Qarah Su Rural District created in the Central District of Maku County. The 2016 census measured the population of the village as 29 people in nine households.
