= Hesar, Maku =

Village in West Azerbaijan province, Iran

Hesar Persian: حصار
- Village
- Location within Iran
- Coordinates: 39°30′22″N 44°38′34″E
- Country: Iran
- Province: West Azerbaijan
- County: Maku
- District: Central
- Rural District: Chaybasar-e Jonubi

Population (2016)
  - Total: 372
- Time zone: UTC+3:30 (IRST)

Hesar (Persian: حصار) (Note: Also romanized as Ḩeşār) is a village in Chaybasar-e Jonubi Rural District of the Central District in Maku County, West Azerbaijan province, Iran.

== Demographics ==
=== Population ===
At the time of the 2006 National Census, the village's population was 391 in 70 households. The following census in 2011 counted 392 people in 91 households. The 2016 census measured the population of the village as 372 people in 83 households.
