= Mohammad Kandi =

Mohammad Kandi (Persian: محمدكندي) may refer to:

- Mohammad Kandi, East Azerbaijan
- Mohammad Kandi, West Azerbaijan
