= Keshmesh Tappeh =

Village in West Azerbaijan province, Iran

Keshmesh Tappeh Persian: كشمش تپه
- Village
- Location within Iran
- Coordinates: 39°20′15″N 44°23′47″E
- Country: Iran
- Province: West Azerbaijan
- County: Maku
- District: Central
- Rural District: Qaleh Darrehsi

Population (2016)
  - Total: 4,046
- Time zone: UTC+3:30 (IRST)

Keshmesh Tappeh (Persian: كشمش تپه) is a village in, and the capital of, Qaleh Darrehsi Rural District in the Central District of Maku County, West Azerbaijan province, Iran.

== Demographics ==
=== Population ===
At the time of the 2006 National Census, the village's population was 2,655 in 594 households. The following census in 2011 counted 3,623 people in 935 households. The 2016 census measured the population of the village as 4,046 people in 1,079 households. It was the most populous village in its rural district.
