= Qezel Dagh-e Kord =

Village in West Azerbaijan province, Iran

Qezel Dagh-e Kord Persian: قزل داغ كرد
- Village
- Location within Iran
- Coordinates: 39°15′21″N 44°39′53″E
- Country: Iran
- Province: West Azerbaijan
- County: Maku
- District: Central
- Rural District: Chaybasar-e Jonubi

Population (2016)
  - Total: 994
- Time zone: UTC+3:30 (IRST)

Qezel Dagh-e Kord (Persian: قزل داغ كرد) (Note: Also romanized as Qezel Dāgh-e Kord and Qezeldāgh-e Kord) is a village in Chaybasar-e Jonubi Rural District of the Central District in Maku County, West Azerbaijan province, Iran.

== Demographics ==
=== Population ===
At the time of the 2006 National Census, the village's population was 838 in 141 households. The following census in 2011 counted 927 people in 201 households. The 2016 census measured the population of the village as 994 people in 238 households.
