= Hasin =

Hasin (Persian: حاسين), also rendered as Hasun, may refer to:

- Həsin, Azerbaijan
- Hasin-e Bozorg, Iran
- Hasin-e Kuchak, Iran
