= Mohammad Kandi, West Azerbaijan =

Mohammad Kandi محمدكندي
- Village
- Location within Iran
- Coordinates: 39°18′27″N 44°24′37″E
- Country: Iran
- Province: West Azerbaijan
- County: Maku
- Bakhsh: Central
- Rural District: Qaleh Darrehsi

Population (2006)
  - Total: 196
- Time zone: UTC+3:30 (IRST)
  - Summer (DST): UTC+4:30 (IRDT)

Mohammad Kandi (Persian: محمدكندي, also Romanized as Moḩammad Kandī) is a village in Qaleh Darrehsi Rural District, in the Central District of Maku County, West Azerbaijan Province, Iran. At the 2006 census, its population was 196, in 45 families.
