= Baghcheh Juq =

Village in West Azerbaijan province, Iran

Baghcheh Juq Persian: باغچه جوق
- Village
- Location within Iran
- Coordinates: 39°17′23″N 44°25′25″E
- Country: Iran
- Province: West Azerbaijan
- County: Maku
- District: Central
- Rural District: Qaleh Darrehsi

Population (2016)
  - Total: 3,860
- Time zone: UTC+3:30 (IRST)

Baghcheh Juq (Persian: باغچه جوق) (Note: Also romanized as Bāghcheh Jūq) is a village in Qaleh Darrehsi Rural District of the Central District in Maku County, West Azerbaijan province, Iran.

== Demographics ==
=== Ethnicity ===
The village is populated by Azerbaijani Turks.

=== Population ===
At the time of the 2006 National Census, the village's population was 1,738 in 393 households. The following census in 2011 counted 2,506 people in 650 households. The 2016 census measured the population of the village as 3,860 people in 1,012 households.
