= Qezel Arkh =

Qezel Arkh (Persian: قزل ارخ) may refer to:

- Qezel Arkh-e Olya
- Qezel Arkh-e Sofla
