= Kajut =

Village in West Azerbaijan province, Iran

Gajot Persian: گجوت
- Village
- Location within Iran
- Coordinates: 39°21′08″N 44°22′17″E
- Country: Iran
- Province: West Azerbaijan
- County: Maku
- District: Central
- Rural District: Qaleh Darrehsi

Population (2016)
  - Total: 905
- Time zone: UTC+3:30 (IRST)

Gajot (Persian: گجوت) (Note: Also romanized as Kajūt; also known as Gachūt and Gajūt) is a village in Qaleh Darrehsi Rural District of the Central District in Maku County, West Azerbaijan province, Iran.

== Demographics ==
=== Population ===
At the time of the 2006 National Census, the village's population was 743 in 201 households. The following census in 2011 counted 846 people in 250 households. The 2016 census measured the population of the village as 905 people in 261 households.
