= Qezel Arkh-e Olya =

Village in West Azerbaijan province, Iran

Qezel Arkh-e Olya Persian: قزل ارخ عليا
- Village
- Location within Iran
- Coordinates: 39°34′38″N 44°51′53″E
- Country: Iran
- Province: West Azerbaijan
- County: Maku
- District: Central
- Rural District: Qarah Su

Population (2016)
  - Total: 529
- Time zone: UTC+3:30 (IRST)

Qezel Arkh-e Olya (Persian: قزل ارخ عليا) (Note: Also romanized as Qezel Ārkh-e ‘Olyā; also known as Qezel Ārkh) is a village in Qarah Su Rural District of the Central District in Maku County, West Azerbaijan province, Iran.

== Demographics ==
=== Population ===
At the time of the 2006 National Census, the village's population was 43 in eight households, when it was in Chaybasar-e Shomali Rural District. The following census in 2011 counted 617 people in 121 households, by which time the village had been transferred to Qarah Su Rural District created in the same district. The 2016 census measured the population of the village as 529 people in 103 households.
