= Malham, Maku =

Village in West Azerbaijan province, Iran

Malham Persian: ملحم
- Village
- Location within Iran
- Coordinates: 39°38′08″N 44°31′53″E
- Country: Iran
- Province: West Azerbaijan
- County: Maku
- District: Bazargan
- Rural District: Chaybasar-e Shomali

Population (2016)
  - Total: 217
- Time zone: UTC+3:30 (IRST)

Malham (Persian: ملحم) (Note: Also romanized as Malḩam) is a village in Chaybasar-e Shomali Rural District of Bazargan District in Maku County, West Azerbaijan province, Iran.

== Demographics ==
=== Population ===
At the time of the 2006 National Census, the village's population was 187 in 38 households, when it was in the Central District. The following census in 2011 counted 204 people in 42 households, by which time the rural district had been separated from the district in the formation of Bazargan District. The 2016 census measured the population of the village as 217 people in 52 households.
