= Hasin-e Bozorg =

Hasin-e Bozorg حاسين بزرگ
- Village
- Location within Iran
- Coordinates: 39°23′11″N 44°41′53″E
- Country: Iran
- Province: West Azerbaijan
- County: Maku
- Bakhsh: Central
- Rural District: Chaybasar-e Jonubi

Population (2006)
  - Total: 219
- Time zone: UTC+3:30 (IRST)
  - Summer (DST): UTC+4:30 (IRDT)

Hasin-e Bozorg (Persian: حاسين بزرگ, also Romanized as Hāsīn-e Bozorg; also known as Hāsan, Ḩāsān Bozorg, Hasoon Bozorg, Hāsūn, Hāsūn-e Bozorg, and Hussain) is a village in Chaybasar-e Jonubi Rural District, in the Central District of Maku County, West Azerbaijan Province, Iran. At the 2006 census, its population was 219, in 49 families.
