= Zeynab Jalalian =

Iranian prisoner

Zeynab Jalalian (Persian: زينب جلاليان; born March 10, 1982, in Dim Qeshlaq, Maku County) is a Kurdish Iranian who has been convicted a mohareb and sentenced to death by an Islamic Revolutionary Court for allegedly being a member of the Kurdish militant group PJAK, which she denies. Jalalian's sentence was later reduced to life imprisonment. Human rights organizations have condemned Jalalian's verdict, torture, conditions of incarceration and the inattention to her medical care.

== Early life ==
When Jalalian was ten years old, she ran away from home because her parents would not allow her to go to school.

== Arrest ==
Jalalian was arrested in March 2008 in the city of Kermanshah and transferred to the detention center of the Intelligence Ministry. Her trial before the Court of First Instance took place in December 2008; after conducting a summary trial, the Court found Jalalian guilty and sentenced her to death, on charges of being a member of the Party of Free Life of Kurdistan (PJAK), a banned Kurdish group: based on her alleged membership of that Kurdistan political party, she was accused of fighting God (mohareb) and given the death penalty. (The Revolution court in Kermanshah conducted a brief trial, without due diligence and proper legal representation, lasting only a few minutes. Jalalian was ill, due to prison conditions and torture. She did not have any lawyer to defend her. The Court told her: "You are a God's enemy and you have to be hanged very soon".)

Jalalian has denied the charges. Her death sentence was confirmed by the Iranian Supreme Court in November 2009.

On June 28, 2010, her family stated that in her last phone call, "which was a month ago, Zeynab has mentioned that she is held in Evin Prison". Since that time, her family or her lawyers had not been able to receive any further information, the authorities responding that her file had been lost.

In an interview with the International Campaign for Human Rights in Iran, published on July 1, 2010, Iranian lawyer Khalil Bahramian talks about him being refused to visit Ms Jalalian in prison.

In 2010, after being incarcerated into section 209 of the Evin prison for five months, and after a meeting with Tehran Public Prosecutor, Jalalian was transferred back to Kermanshah prison. The Supreme Court of Iran has reduced Jalalian's sentence to life imprisonment. In December 2011, Ms. Jalalian contacted her lawyer to inform him that, according to prison authorities, her sentence had been reduced to life imprisonment. In Kermanshah prison, Zeynab Jalalian was verbally informed by judicial authorities that her death sentence had been commuted to imprisonment.

== Denied treatment ==
In April 2016, the Office of the High Commissioner for Human Rights (UN Human Rights Working Group on Arbitrary Detention) issued an official request to the Islamic Republic of Iran to release Zeinab Jalalian immediately, as the deprivation of her liberty is arbitrary, being in contravention of the Universal Declaration of Human Rights (UDHR) and the International Covenant on Civil and Political Rights (ICCPR). The Working Group also considers that an adequate remedy would be to accord Jalalian an enforceable right to compensation in accordance the ICCPR. Indeed, Jalalian was being subjected to torture by the Iranian authorities and was denied access to treatments and specialized medical care despite her deteriorating health in Khoy prison, West Azerbaijan Province. She has several medical conditions, including a heart problem and a severe dental infection.

== Hunger strike ==
Zeinab Jalalian, along with nine prisoners of ordinary offences, went on hunger strike in protest to being deprived of weekly visits and basic prison facilities on August 4, 2018. The strike ended the day after with no result.

== COVID-19 ==
In early June 2020, Ali Jalalian, the father of Zeynab Jalalian, told the Kurdistan Human Rights Network she was being held in quarantine since April 29, 2020, at Gharchak Women's Prison in Varamin and has been diagnosed with COVID-19. In the Gharchak prison, health and food standards are not observed. The Ministry of Intelligence has not allowed her to be taken to a hospital outside the prison. In late July 2020, Human Rights in Iran indicated that Jalalian had been transferred to Kerman prison. She was reported to be in poor health at the prison. On September 24, 2020, she was relocated to Dizel Abad Prison in Kermanshah. On November 10, 2020, Jalalian informed her family in a 2-minute phone call that she had been transferred to Yazd Prison and that she had been beaten and verbally abused along the way.

== Sponsorship by a member of the Bundestag ==
Cansu Özdemir, a member of Germany’s federal parliament, has taken on the political sponsorship of Jalalian, as the latter is entering her twentieth year of imprisonment.

== See also ==
- Human rights in the Islamic Republic of Iran
