= Qaleh Juq, Maku =

Village in West Azerbaijan province, Iran

Qaleh Juq Persian: قلعه جوق
- Village
- Location within Iran
- Coordinates: 39°16′45″N 44°28′36″E
- Country: Iran
- Province: West Azerbaijan
- County: Maku
- District: Central
- Rural District: Qaleh Darrehsi

Population (2016)
  - Total: 855
- Time zone: UTC+3:30 (IRST)

Qaleh Juq (Persian: قلعه جوق) (Note: Also romanized as Qal‘eh Jūq) is a village in Qaleh Darrehsi Rural District of the Central District in Maku County, West Azerbaijan province, Iran.

== Demographics ==
=== Population ===
At the time of the 2006 National Census, the village's population was 696 in 170 households. The following census in 2011 counted 836 people in 239 households. The 2016 census measured the population of the village as 855 people in 254 households.
