= Rend =

Rend may refer to:

- Rend, Iran
- Rend River
- Rend Lake
- Rend, a video game by Frostkeep Studios
