= Malham, Iran =

Malham (Persian: ملحم) may refer to:

- Malham, Ardabil
- Malham, Maku, West Azerbaijan Province
- Malham, Salmas, West Azerbaijan Province
