= Baqcheh Jooq Palace =

Palace in Iran

Coordinates: 39.28944°N 44.42628°E

Baqcheh Jooq Palace (Persian: کاخ باغچه‌جوق) is a palace located between the border towns of Maku and Bazargan in West Azerbaijan province, Iran. Its construction begun under Teymur Pasha Khan and it was completed under Mortezaqoli Eqbal al-Saltaneh Makui.

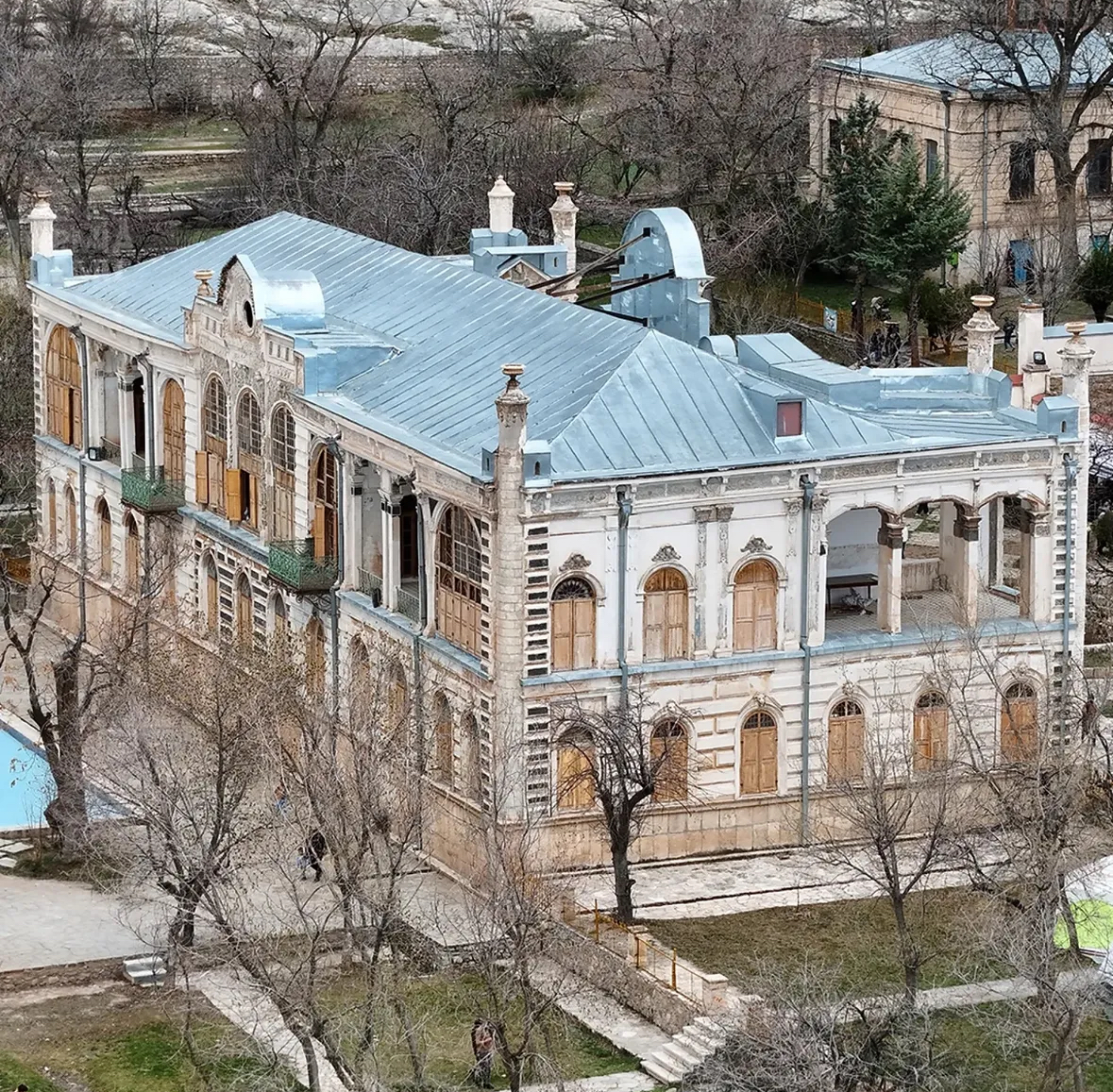
Baqcheh Jooq Palace or Kakh Muzeh Maku, is currently a museum

== Gallery ==
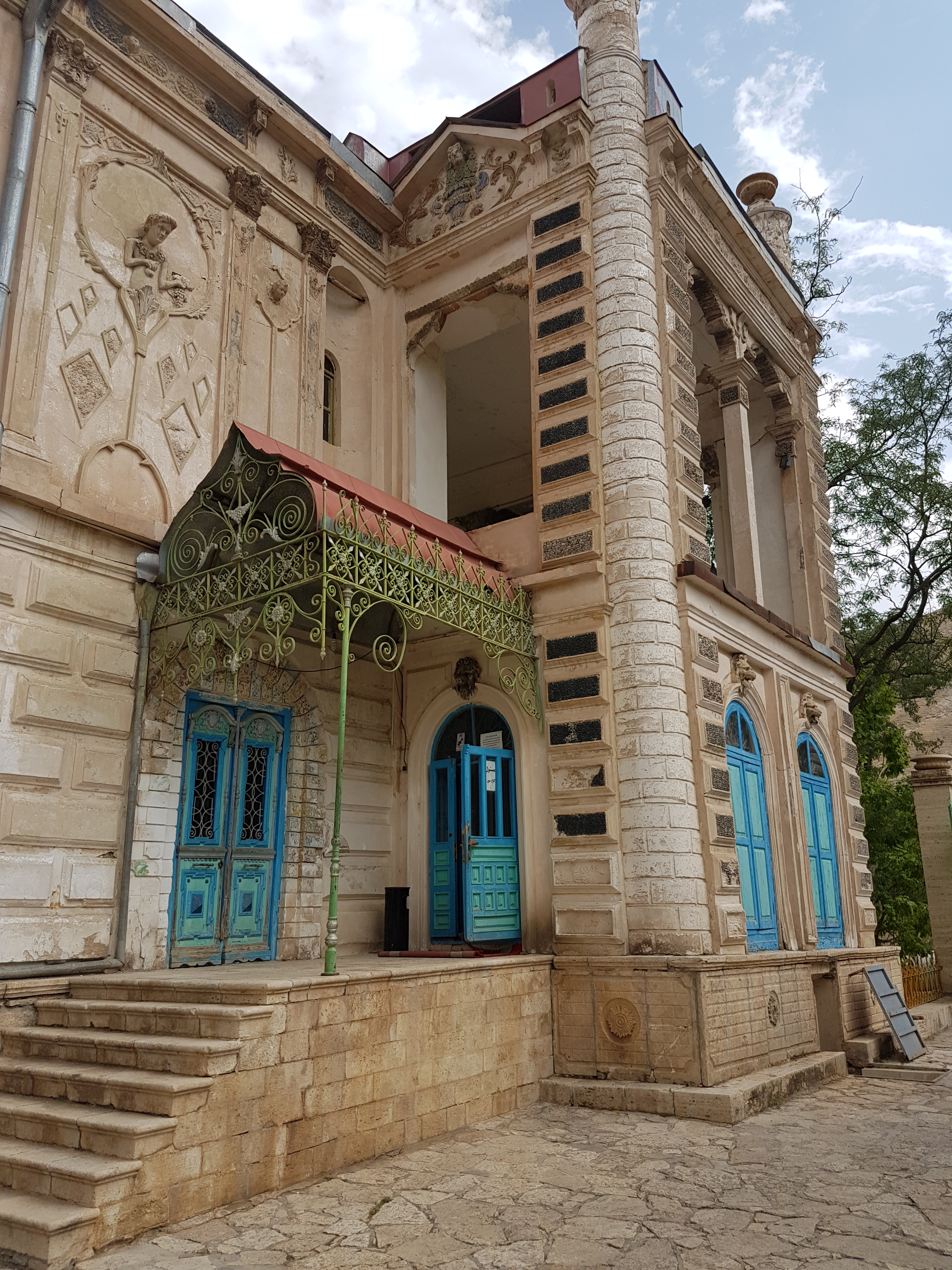

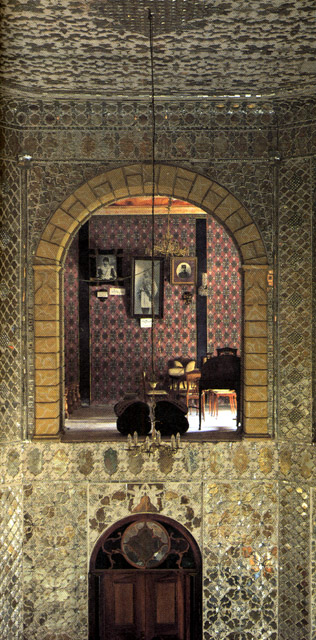
Ayeneh-kari

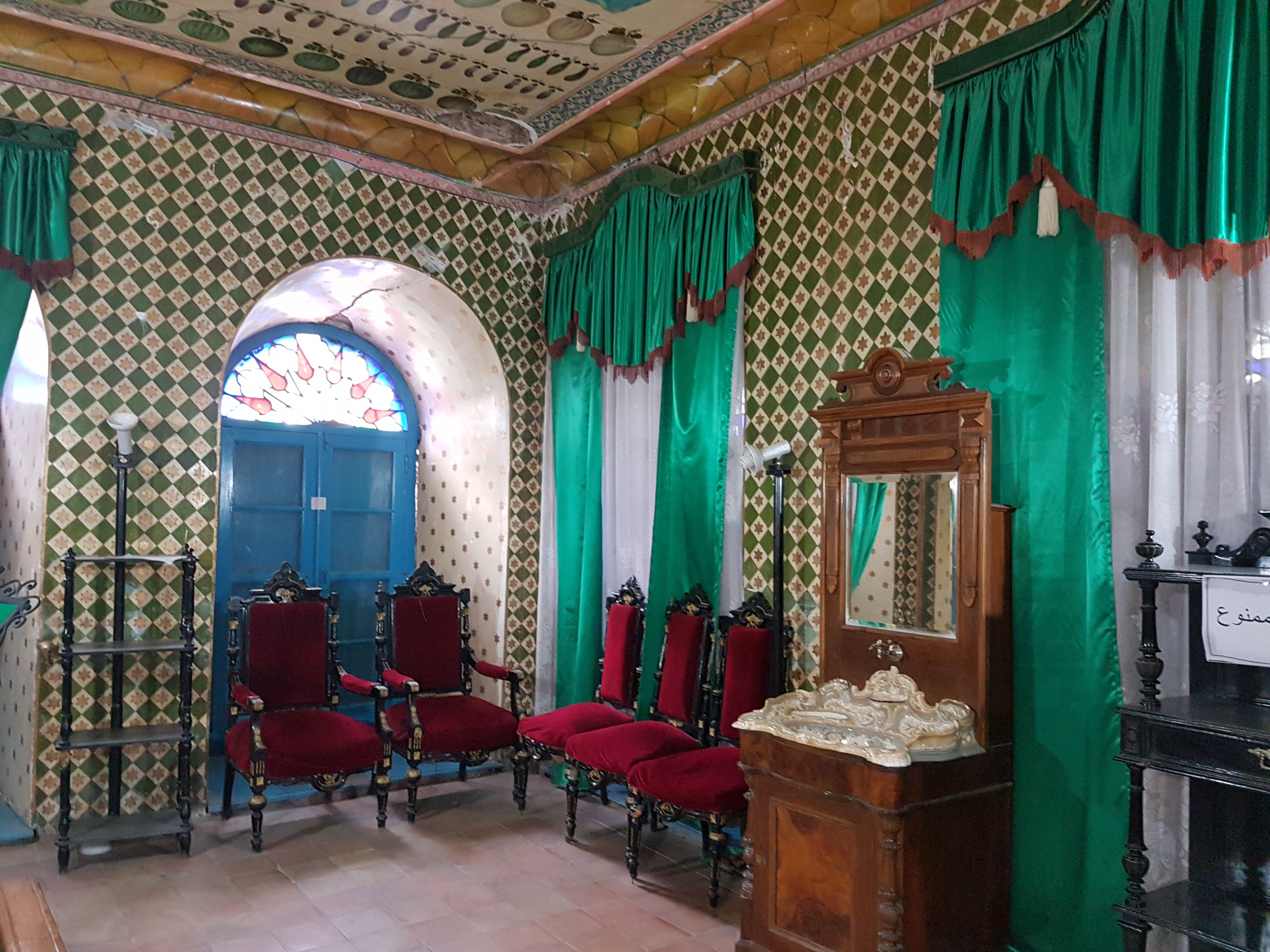

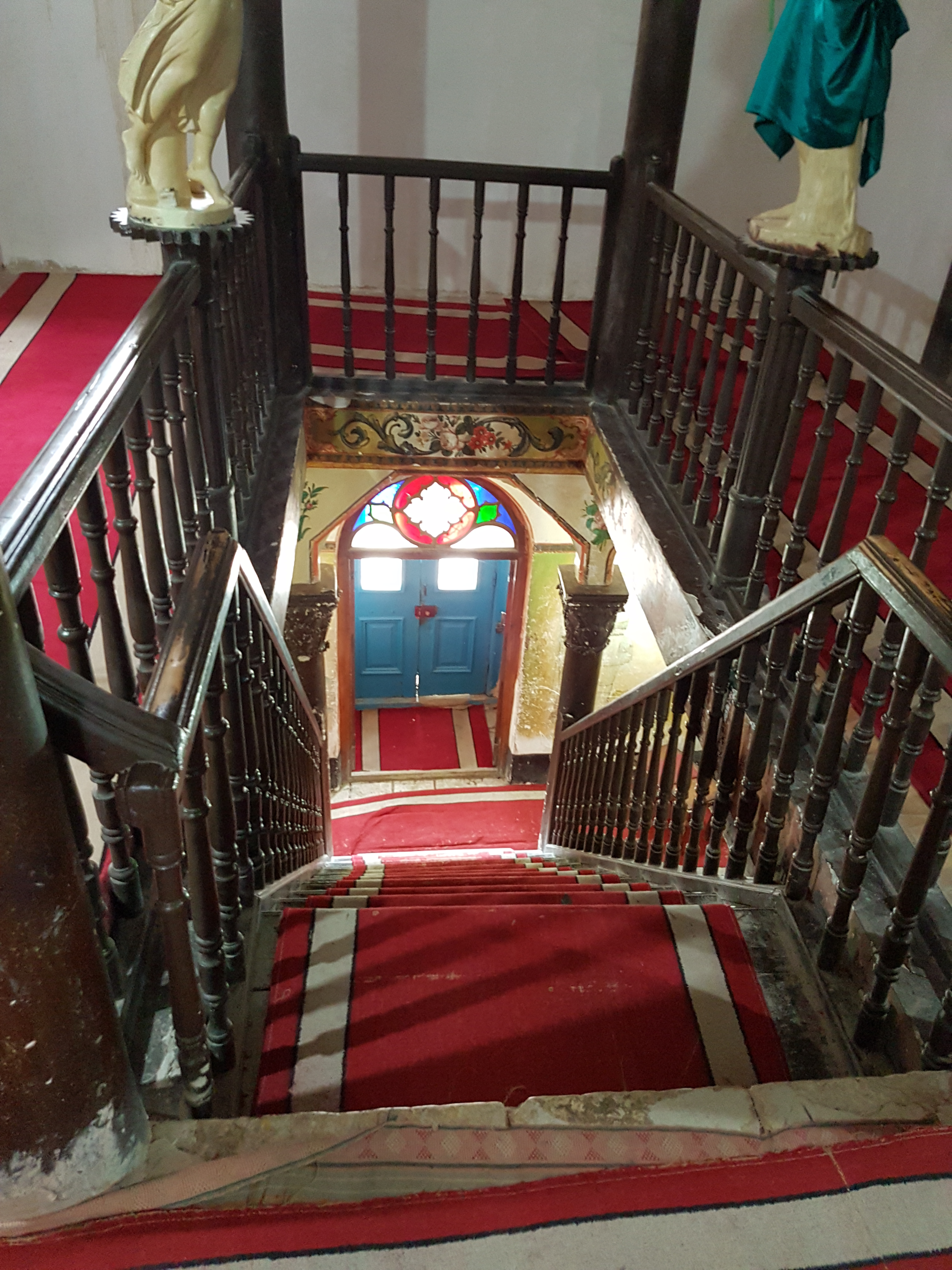

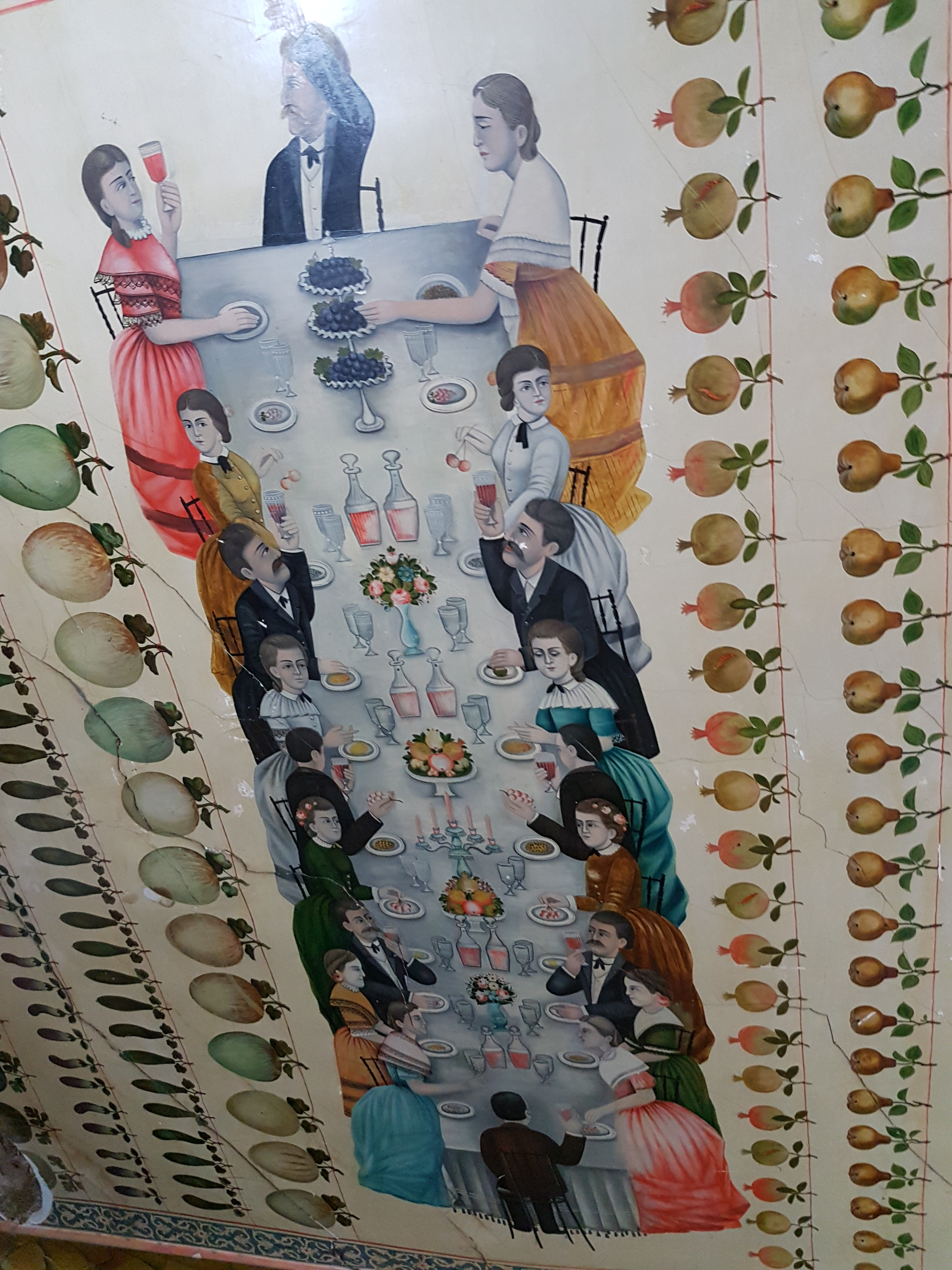
