= Danaluy-e Bozorg =

Village in West Azerbaijan province, Iran

Danaluy-e Bozorg Persian: دانالوي بزرگ
- Village
- Location within Iran
- Coordinates: 39°21′06″N 44°31′55″E
- Country: Iran
- Province: West Azerbaijan
- County: Maku
- District: Central
- Rural District: Qaleh Darrehsi

Population (2016)
  - Total: 429
- Time zone: UTC+3:30 (IRST)

Danaluy-e Bozorg (Persian: دانالوي بزرگ) (Note: Also romanized as Dānālūy-e Bozorg; also known as Dānālū and Dānālū-ye Bozorg) is a village in Qaleh Darrehsi Rural District of the Central District in Maku County, West Azerbaijan province, Iran.

== Demographics ==
=== Population ===
At the time of the 2006 National Census, the village's population was 451 in 97 households. The following census in 2011 counted 451 people in 118 households. The 2016 census measured the population of the village as 429 people in 129 households.
