= Tuzu =

Tuzu may refer to:

- Monguor people
- Tuzu, Iran
