= Maku, Iran =

City in West Azerbaijan province, Iran

Maku Persian: ماکو Kurdish: Makû
- City
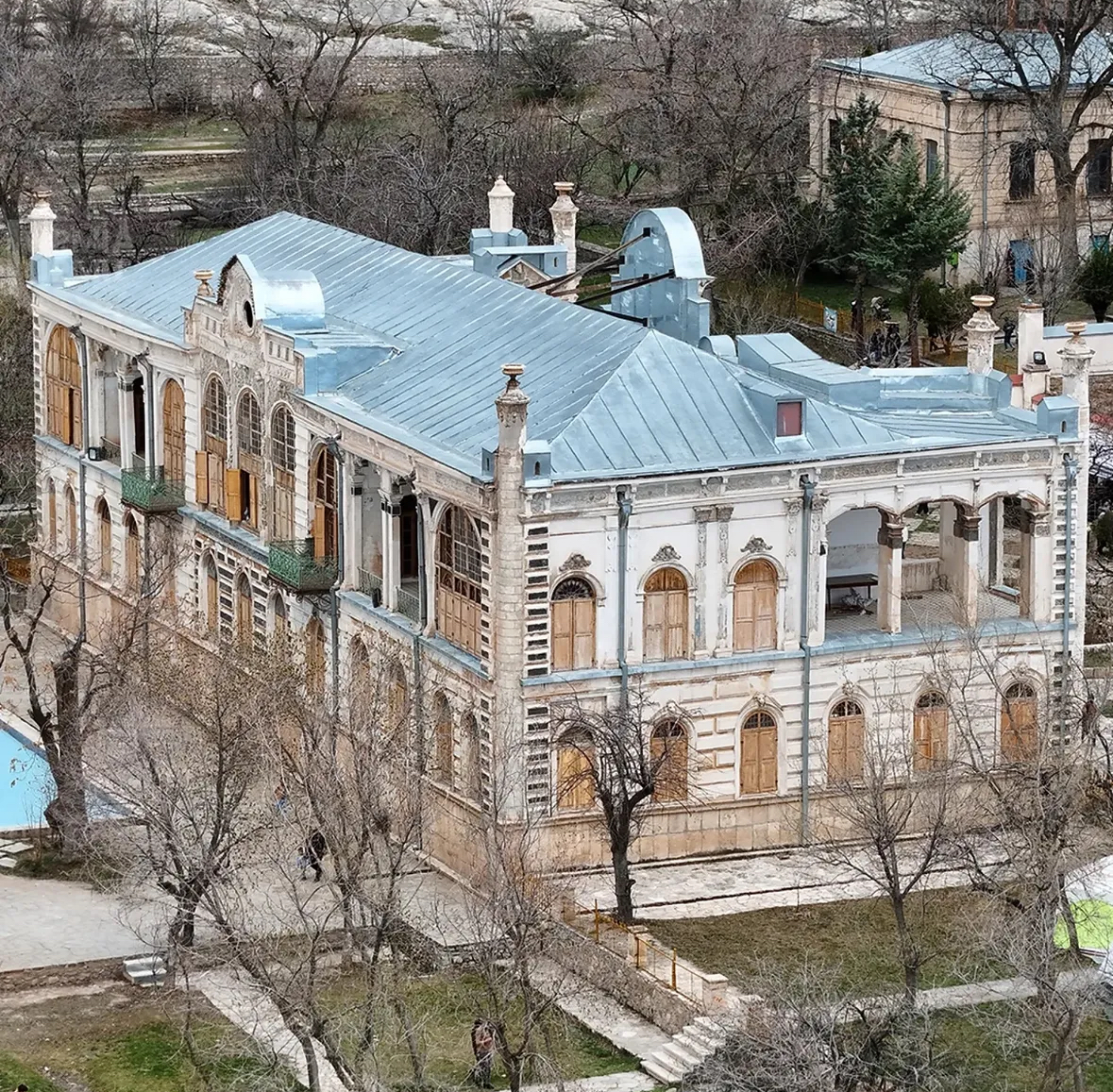
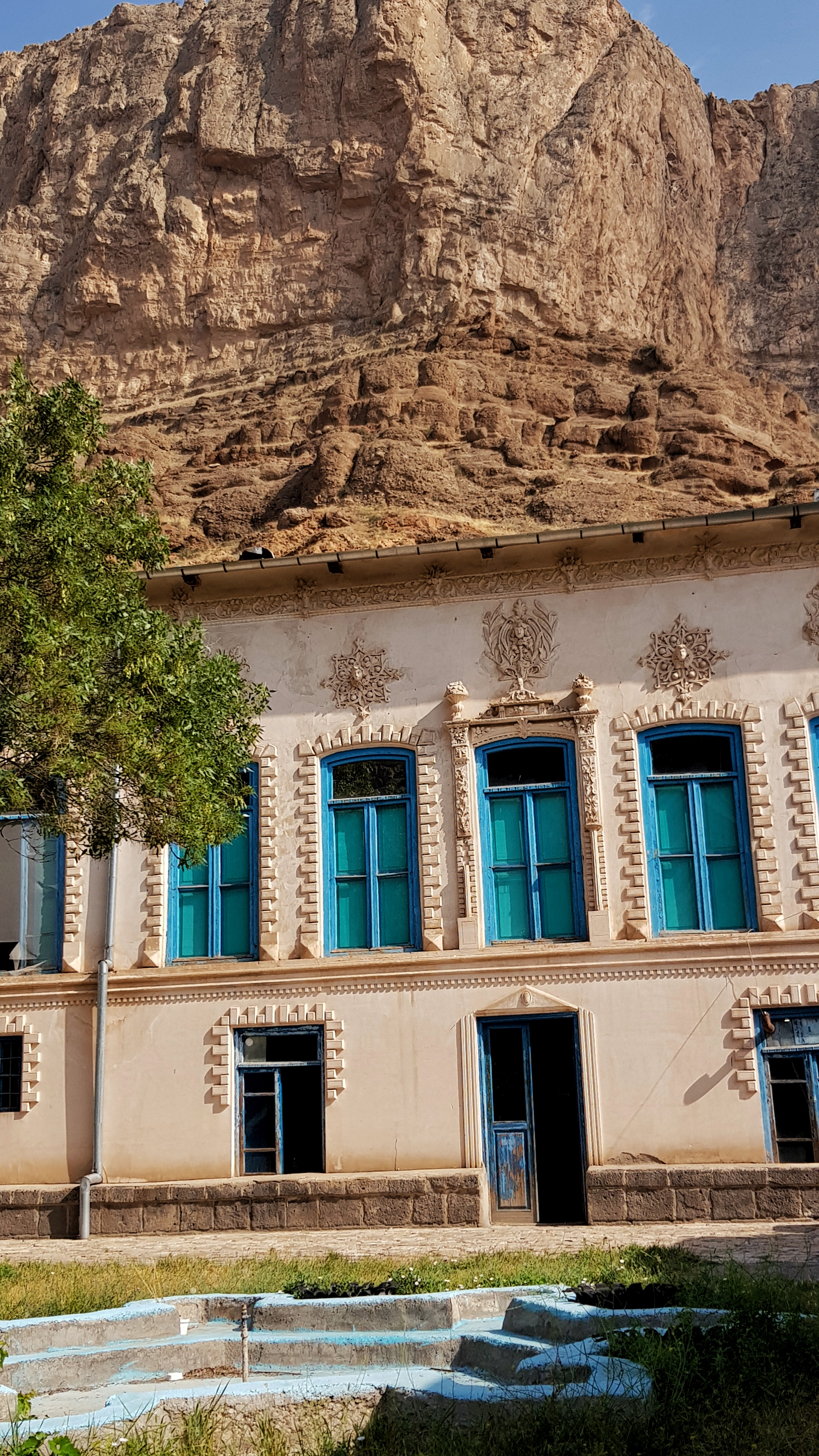
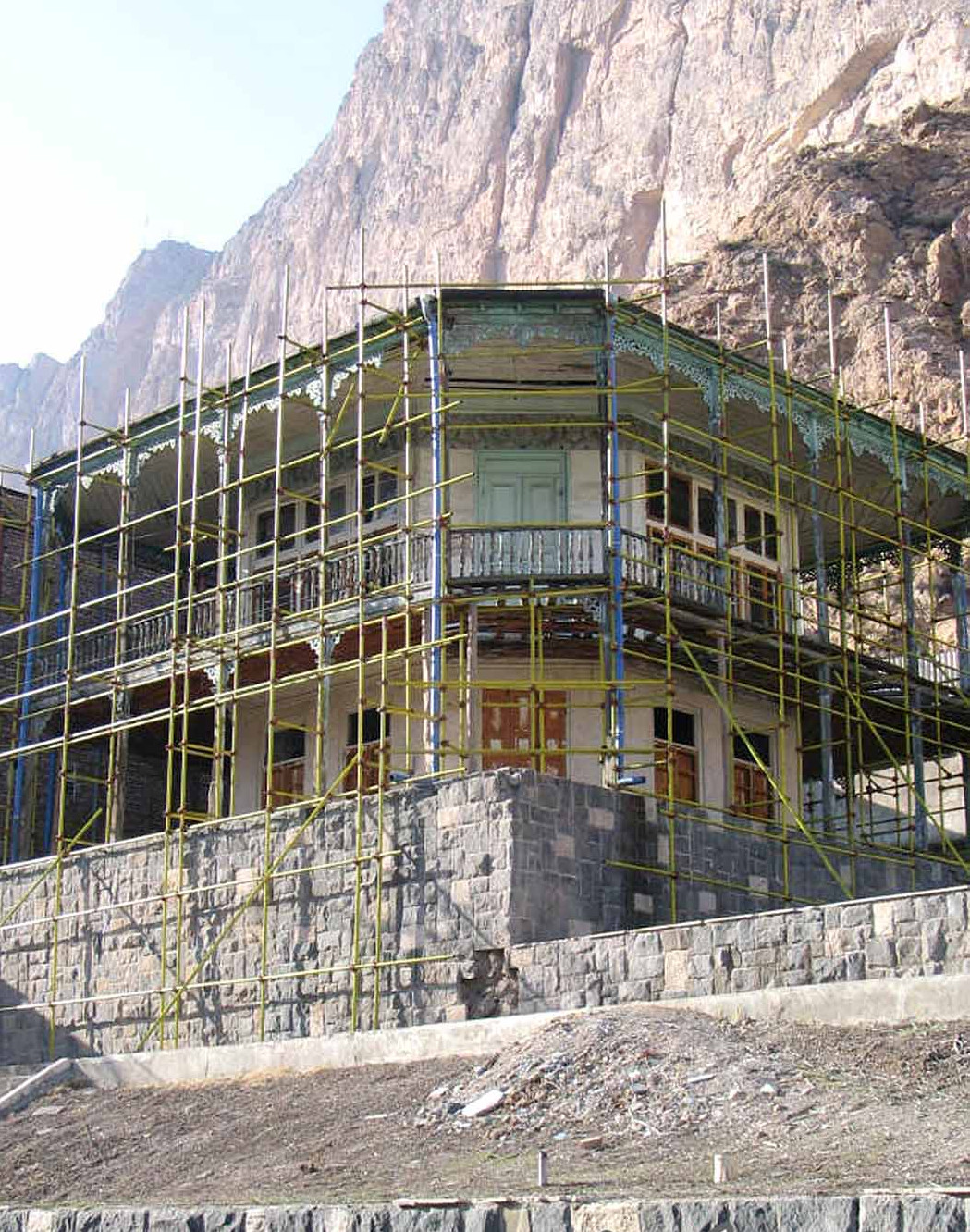
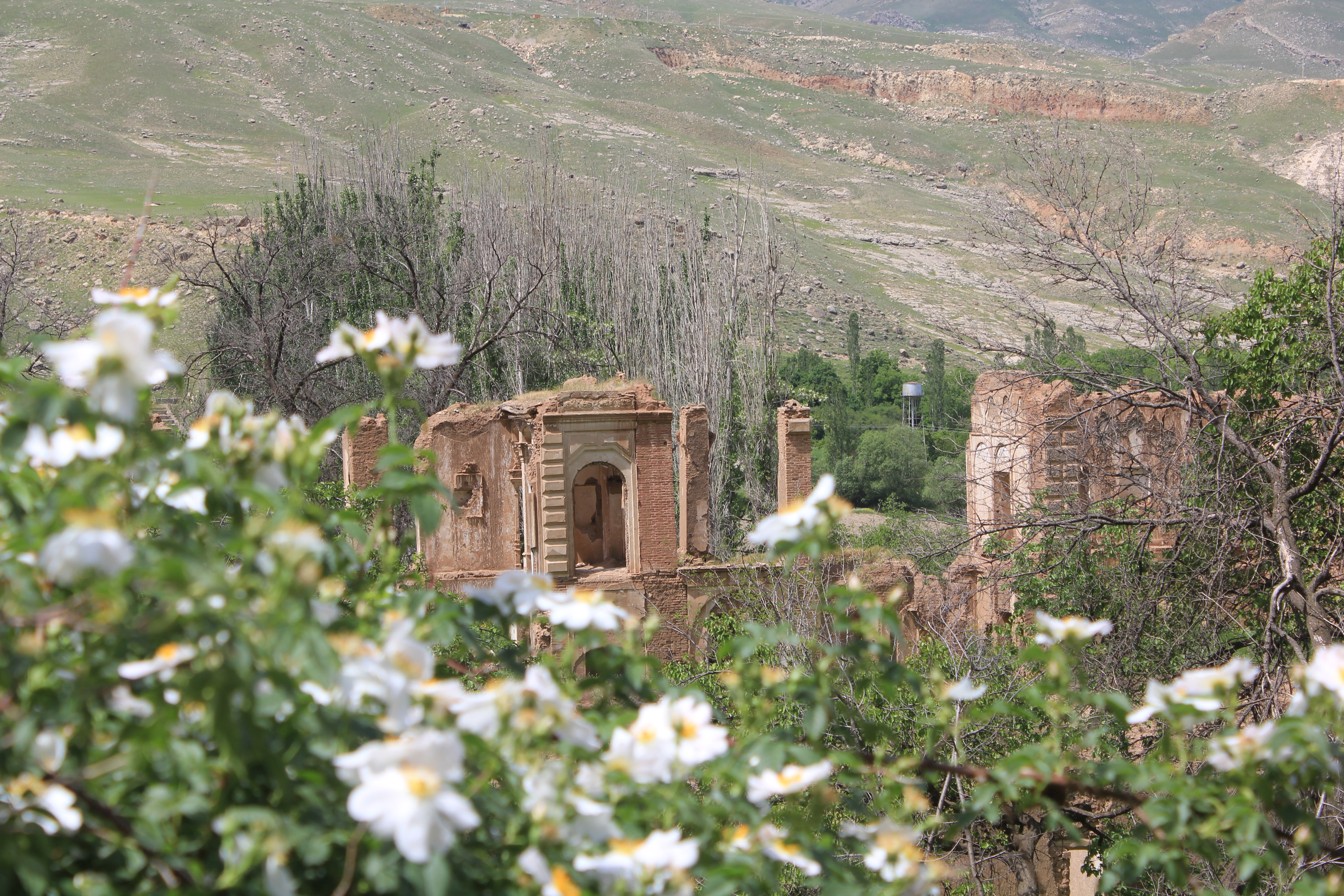
- Baqcheh Jooq Palace Ezatollah Khan Palace

- Location within Iran
- Coordinates: 39°17′39″N 44°29′50″E
- Country: Iran
- Province: West Azerbaijan
- County: Maku
- District: Central

Population (2016)
  - Total: 46,581
- Time zone: UTC+3:30 (IRST)
- Website: www.maku.zone

Maku (Persian: ماكو) (Note: Also romanized as Mākū; Armenian: Մակու; Azerbaijani: ماكي, romanized as Makı; Kurdish: ماکۆ, romanized as Mako) is a city in the Central District of Maku County, West Azerbaijan province, Iran, serving as capital of both the county and the district.

Maku is 22 kilometres (14 mi) from the Turkish border in a mountain gorge at an altitude of 1,634 metres. The Zangmar River cuts through the city. The Maku Free Trade and Industrial Zone, which opened in 2011, is Iran's largest and the world's second largest free trade zone, encompassing an area of 5,000 square kilometres.

== History ==
Maku was a region of the old Armenia c. 300–800, previously known as Artaz according to Aziz Atiya's History of Eastern Christianity.

The Castle of Maku, original Shavarshan, was the center of the domains of the princely Armenian family of Amatuni. The Artazian branch of Amatuni family ruled the Maku region of Artaz still in the XVth century and successfully defended it against Timurleng, when he besieged the castle of Maku. Maku was the capital of a Kangarli Khanate, one of numerous small, semi-independent Maku Khanates that emerged from the breakup of the Safavid Empire in the 18th century.

Maku served as the capital of the Kurdish Jalali dynasty into the 1860s when the centralizing Qajar government in Persia/Iran removed them, appointing a governor instead.

The city is well known in the history of the Baháʼí Faith for its fort where the Báb had been exiled to and imprisoned for nine months. At this fortress Mullá Husayn, the first Disciple of the Báb, arrived on Náw-Rúz of the year 1848 to see the Báb.

== Demographics ==
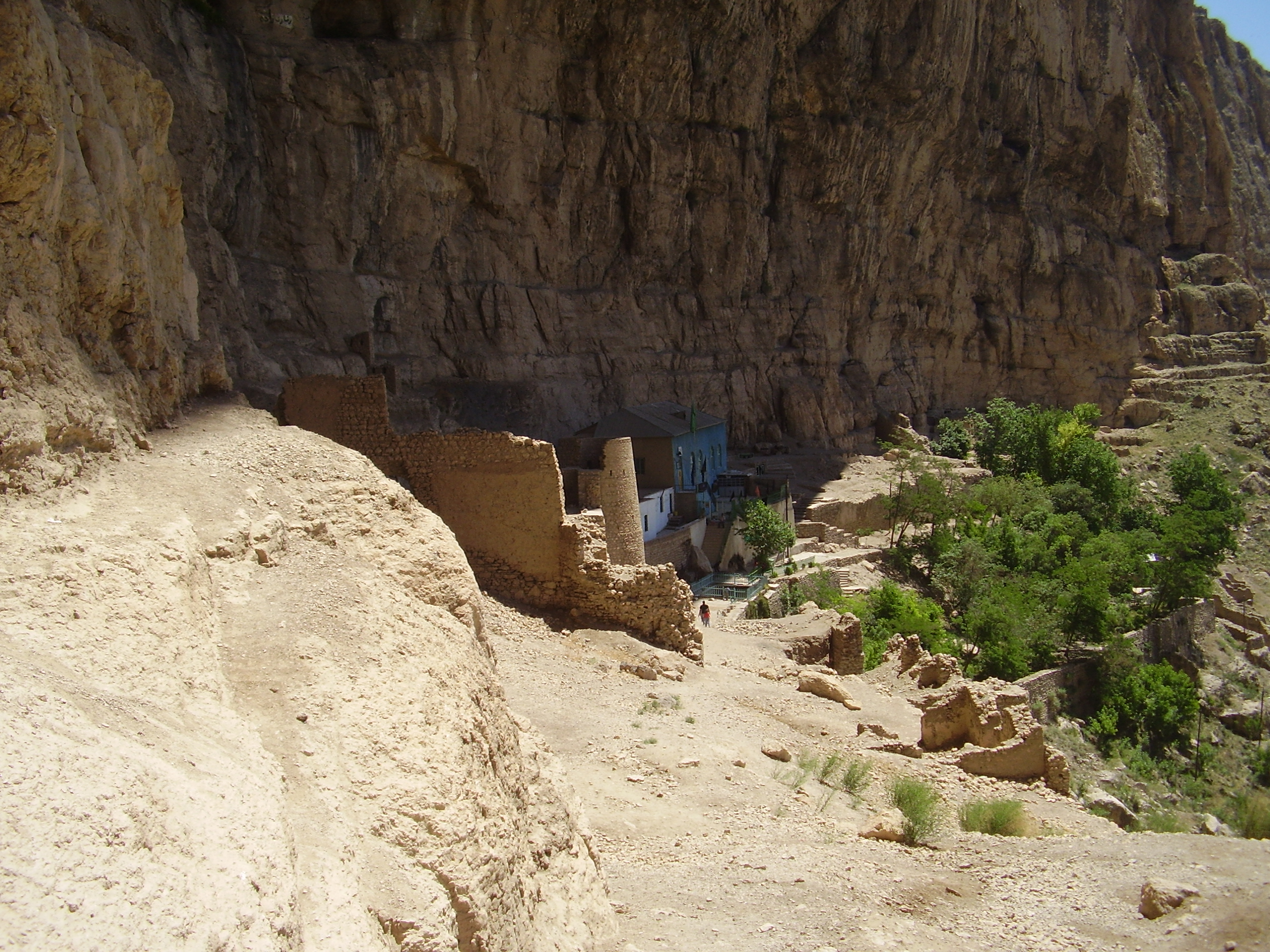
Old Fort

=== Language and ethnicity ===
The main languages spoken in Maku are Azerbaijani Turkish and Kurdish.

=== Population ===
At the time of the 2006 National Census, the city's population was 41,865 in 10,428 households. The following census in 2011 counted 42,751 people in 11,761 households. The 2016 census measured the population of the city as 46,581 people in 13,940 households.

== Climate ==
Maku has a semi-arid climate (Köppen BSk) owing to its location in the rain shadow of the Zagros Mountains. The city is hot and dry in the summer, and cold with little snow in the winter. Most precipitation comes from spring thunderstorms.

Highest recorded temperature:39.2 °C (102.6 °F) on 12 July 2018
Lowest recorded temperature:−23.0 °C (−9.4 °F) on 24 February 1985

Climate data for Maku (1991-2020, extremes 1985-present)
Month	Jan	Feb	Mar	Apr	May	Jun	Jul	Aug	Sep	Oct	Nov	Dec	Year
Record high °C (°F)	12.0 (53.6)	15.2 (59.4)	24.2 (75.6)	29.8 (85.6)	32.4 (90.3)	37.4 (99.3)	39.2 (102.6)	38.4 (101.1)	35.8 (96.4)	30.2 (86.4)	22.2 (72.0)	19.0 (66.2)	39.2 (102.6)
Mean daily maximum °C (°F)	0.9 (33.6)	3.8 (38.8)	9.7 (49.5)	15.6 (60.1)	20.4 (68.7)	26.1 (79.0)	29.9 (85.8)	30.2 (86.4)	25.5 (77.9)	18.4 (65.1)	10.1 (50.2)	3.3 (37.9)	16.2 (61.2)
Daily mean °C (°F)	−3.6 (25.5)	−1.0 (30.2)	4.8 (40.6)	10.5 (50.9)	15.0 (59.0)	20.1 (68.2)	23.9 (75.0)	24.1 (75.4)	19.4 (66.9)	12.8 (55.0)	5.0 (41.0)	−1.1 (30.0)	10.8 (51.4)
Mean daily minimum °C (°F)	−7.2 (19.0)	−4.8 (23.4)	0.5 (32.9)	5.7 (42.3)	9.7 (49.5)	13.8 (56.8)	17.7 (63.9)	17.7 (63.9)	13.2 (55.8)	7.8 (46.0)	1.0 (33.8)	−4.5 (23.9)	5.9 (42.6)
Record low °C (°F)	−22.8 (−9.0)	−23.0 (−9.4)	−22.0 (−7.6)	−8.0 (17.6)	0.0 (32.0)	4.0 (39.2)	8.0 (46.4)	9.4 (48.9)	2.4 (36.3)	−2.6 (27.3)	−15.3 (4.5)	−22.0 (−7.6)	−23.0 (−9.4)
Average precipitation mm (inches)	15.3 (0.60)	16.2 (0.64)	30.5 (1.20)	46.3 (1.82)	59.4 (2.34)	37.4 (1.47)	18.6 (0.73)	12.3 (0.48)	14.1 (0.56)	24.9 (0.98)	22.1 (0.87)	14.7 (0.58)	311.8 (12.28)
Average precipitation days (≥ 1.0 mm)	3.3	3.8	5.6	7.9	10.4	6.8	3.8	2.2	2.4	5.3	4.7	3.6	59.8
Average relative humidity (%)	73	65	58	55	56	47	43	41	44	56	66	73	56.4
Average dew point °C (°F)	−8.2 (17.2)	−7.4 (18.7)	−3.7 (25.3)	0.8 (33.4)	5.3 (41.5)	7.4 (45.3)	9.5 (49.1)	8.8 (47.8)	5.8 (42.4)	3.2 (37.8)	−1.4 (29.5)	−5.7 (21.7)	1.2 (34.1)
Mean monthly sunshine hours	133	155	175	184	231	295	324	321	276	204	164	122	2,584
Source 1: NOAA NCEI
Source 2: IRIMO (extremes

Climate data for Maku, Iran (1985-2010, extremes 1985-present)
Month	Jan	Feb	Mar	Apr	May	Jun	Jul	Aug	Sep	Oct	Nov	Dec	Year
Record high °C (°F)	12.0 (53.6)	15.2 (59.4)	24.2 (75.6)	29.8 (85.6)	32.4 (90.3)	37.4 (99.3)	39.2 (102.6)	38.4 (101.1)	35.8 (96.4)	30.2 (86.4)	22.2 (72.0)	19.0 (66.2)	39.2 (102.6)
Mean daily maximum °C (°F)	0.3 (32.5)	2.8 (37.0)	8.6 (47.5)	15.3 (59.5)	20.0 (68.0)	25.5 (77.9)	29.4 (84.9)	29.6 (85.3)	25.1 (77.2)	17.7 (63.9)	10.1 (50.2)	3.3 (37.9)	15.6 (60.2)
Daily mean °C (°F)	−3.7 (25.3)	−1.3 (29.7)	4.1 (39.4)	10.4 (50.7)	14.7 (58.5)	19.4 (66.9)	23.3 (73.9)	23.4 (74.1)	18.9 (66.0)	12.6 (54.7)	5.6 (42.1)	−0.5 (31.1)	10.6 (51.0)
Mean daily minimum °C (°F)	−7.8 (18.0)	−5.5 (22.1)	−0.4 (31.3)	5.6 (42.1)	9.3 (48.7)	13.3 (55.9)	17.2 (63.0)	17.2 (63.0)	12.7 (54.9)	7.4 (45.3)	1.1 (34.0)	−4.3 (24.3)	5.5 (41.9)
Record low °C (°F)	−22.8 (−9.0)	−23.0 (−9.4)	−22.0 (−7.6)	−8.0 (17.6)	0.0 (32.0)	4.0 (39.2)	8.0 (46.4)	9.4 (48.9)	2.4 (36.3)	−2.6 (27.3)	−15.3 (4.5)	−22.0 (−7.6)	−23.0 (−9.4)
Average precipitation mm (inches)	14.4 (0.57)	19.4 (0.76)	30.2 (1.19)	42.8 (1.69)	53.7 (2.11)	40.0 (1.57)	17.6 (0.69)	11.3 (0.44)	11.5 (0.45)	26.0 (1.02)	20.1 (0.79)	15.8 (0.62)	302.8 (11.9)
Average precipitation days (≥ 1.0 mm)	3.5	4.0	5.7	7.1	9.8	6.8	3.2	2.0	1.9	5.0	4.6	3.9	57.5
Average snowy days	8.5	7.8	5.5	1.1	0	0	0	0	0	0.2	2.7	6.6	32.4
Average relative humidity (%)	73	67	59	55	55	48	44	42	44	57	65	72	57
Average dew point °C (°F)	−8.4 (16.9)	−8.0 (17.6)	−4.5 (23.9)	0.6 (33.1)	4.6 (40.3)	7.2 (45.0)	9.6 (49.3)	8.9 (48.0)	4.9 (40.8)	3.0 (37.4)	−1.6 (29.1)	−5.7 (21.7)	0.9 (33.6)
Mean monthly sunshine hours	126.5	146.2	181.2	185.7	230.4	290.2	327.0	322.5	274.8	199.9	162.6	119.7	2,566.7
Source 1: IRIMO (extremes)(temperature normals) (dew point), (humidity), (precipitation), (snow and sleet days), (sun 1985-2005)
Source 2: Meteomanz(extremes since 2011)

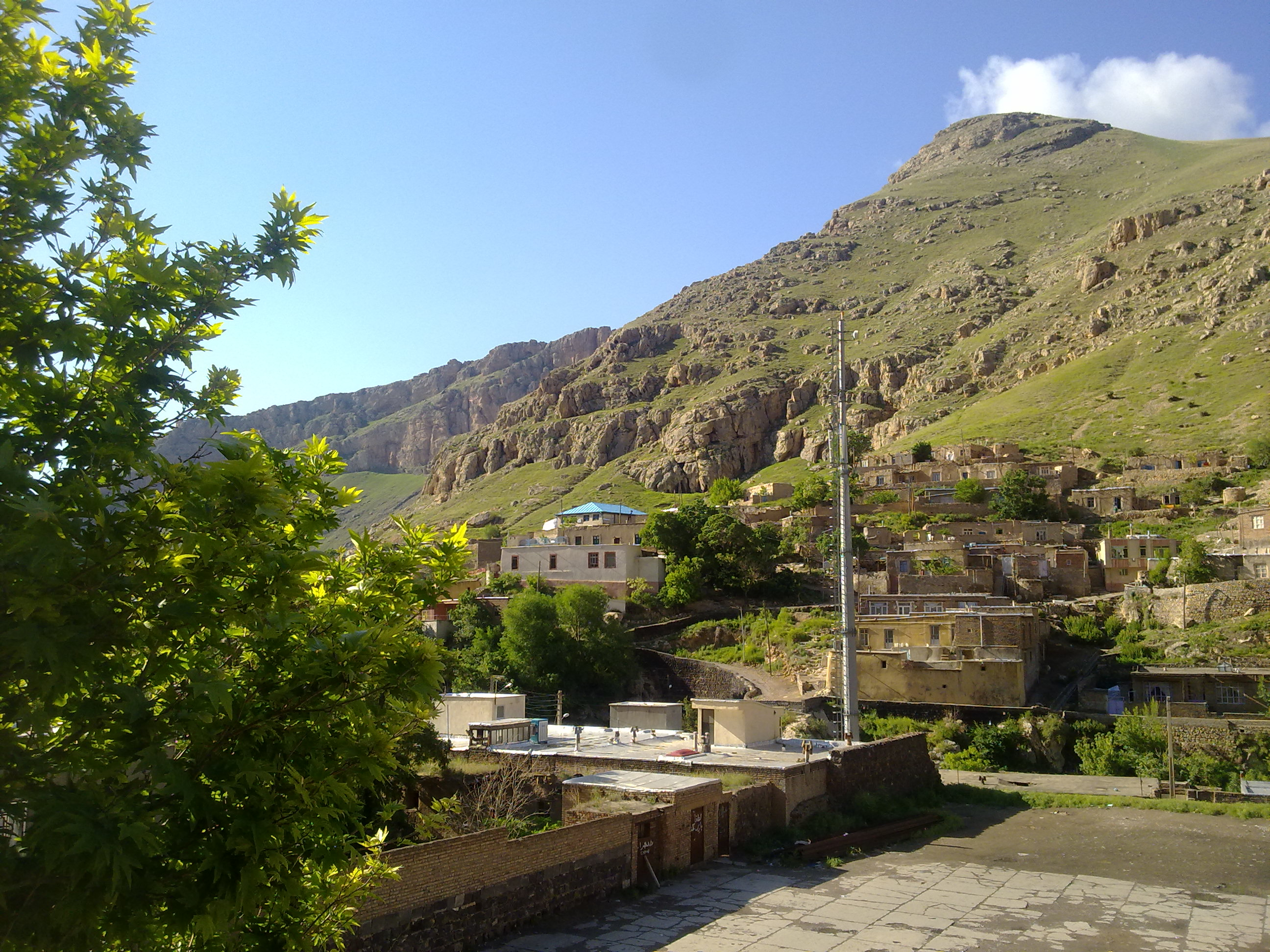
A view of Maku- Shirzadeh

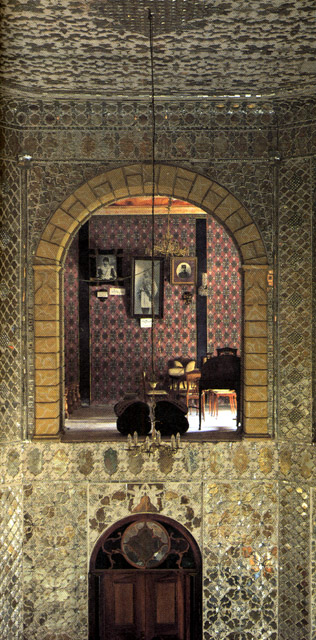
Kakh Muzeh Maku, near Maku, built by one of the commanders of Mozzafar-al-Din Shah, is a popular attraction.

== Tourism ==
1. Baqcheh Jooq Palace: dates back to the end of the Qajar period. It used to be the house of the local governor until 1974. It is 7 km northwest of central Maku and presently functions as a museum displaying some carpets and local handicrafts.
2. Farhad's Home: A place near Baqcheh Jooq Palace. A small home with a hall and two rooms that carved into the rock. The saying comes form the story Farhad and Shirin.
3. Ruins of a fortress are folded into a ledge of the high cliff that towers above the town centre.
4. Hiking: it is advisable to have a guide or stay within eyesight of the town. Due to its proximity to the Turkish border, it is easy to cross the border unintentionally.
5. Rock climbing: There are numerous rock climbing sites at the northern part of the city, some exceeding 200 meters.
6. Panj Cheshmeh – This bridge is located 5 km. from Maku on the Zangmar River, and is a monument from the Safavid era. This bridge was constructed in order to facilitate communications between Tabriz and Maku, and the surrounding rural areas.

=== Visa-free ===
Holders of normal passports travelling as tourists can enter Maku, Iran without a visa with maximum stay of 2 weeks (extendable) as of September 2017.

=== Admission refused ===
Admission is refused to holders of passports or travel documents containing an Israeli visa or stamp or any data showing that the visitor has been to Israel or indication of any connection with the state of Israel during the last 12 months.
