= Qarah Su Rural District (Maku County) =

Rural district in West Azerbaijan province, Iran

Qarah Su Rural District Persian: دهستان قره‌سو
- Rural District
- Location within Iran
- Coordinates: 39°35′N 44°47′E
- Country: Iran
- Province: West Azerbaijan
- County: Maku
- District: Central
- Established: 2007
- Capital: Dim Qeshlaq-e Olya

Population (2016)
  - Total: 6,012
- Time zone: UTC+3:30 (IRST)

Qarah Su Rural District (Persian: دهستان قره‌سو) is in the Central District of Maku County, West Azerbaijan province, Iran. Its capital is the village of Dim Qeshlaq-e Olya.

== History ==
Qarah Su Rural District was established in the Central District in 2007.

== Demographics ==
=== Population ===
At the time of the 2011 census, the rural district's population was 6,955 inhabitants in 1,411 households. The 2016 census measured the population of the rural district as 6,012 in 1,372 households. The most populous of its 24 villages was Dim Qeshlaq-e Olya, with 1,015 people.

=== Other villages in the rural district ===
- Agh Gol
- Isa Kandi
- Khalkhaleh
- Khezr Qeshlaq
- Molla Hasan
- Qaderqamu
- Qarah Bolagh
- Qarah Qowyun
- Qeshlaq-e Bahluleh
- Qezel Arkh-e Olya
- Qezel Arkh-e Sofla
- Qom Qeshlaq
- Quchali
- Sarenj
- Shuraq Gol
- Zanganeh
- Zel Keh-ye Olya
- Zel Keh-ye Sofla
