= Qaleh Juq, Urmia =

Qaleh Juq قلعه جوق
- Village
- Location within Iran
- Coordinates: 37°24′50″N 45°09′20″E
- Country: Iran
- Province: West Azerbaijan
- County: Urmia
- Bakhsh: Central
- Rural District: Baranduzchay-ye Jonubi

Population (2006)
  - Total: 138
- Time zone: UTC+3:30 (IRST)
  - Summer (DST): UTC+4:30 (IRDT)

Qaleh Juq (Persian: قلعه جوق, also Romanized as Qal‘eh Jūq) is a village in Baranduzchay-ye Jonubi Rural District, in the Central District of Urmia County, West Azerbaijan Province, Iran. At the 2006 census, its population was 138, in 37 families.
