= Tereki =

Tereki تركي
- Village
- Location within Iran
- Coordinates: 32°21′59″N 49°56′04″E
- Country: Iran
- Province: Chaharmahal and Bakhtiari
- County: Kuhrang
- Bakhsh: Bazoft
- Rural District: Bazoft

Population (2006)
  - Total: 142
- Time zone: UTC+3:30 (IRST)
  - Summer (DST): UTC+4:30 (IRDT)

Tereki (Persian: تركي, also Romanized as Terekī and Terkī; also known as Bazargān) is a village in Bazoft Rural District, Bazoft District, Kuhrang County, Chaharmahal and Bakhtiari Province, Iran. At the 2006 census, its population was 142, in 21 families. The village is populated by Lurs.
