= Qaleh Juq-e Olya =

Qaleh Juq-e Olya قلعه جوق عليا
- Village
- Location within Iran
- Coordinates: 37°32′54″N 46°42′45″E
- Country: Iran
- Province: East Azerbaijan
- County: Bostanabad
- Bakhsh: Tekmeh Dash
- Rural District: Sahandabad

Population (2006)
  - Total: 60
- Time zone: UTC+3:30 (IRST)
  - Summer (DST): UTC+4:30 (IRDT)

Qaleh Juq-e Olya (Persian: قلعه جوق عليا, also Romanized as Qal‘eh Jūq-e ‘Olyā; also known as Qal‘eh Jūq-e Bālā) is a village in Sahandabad Rural District, Tekmeh Dash District, Bostanabad County, East Azerbaijan Province, Iran. At the 2006 census, its population was 60, in 14 families.
