= Paul Geday =

Egyptian film director

- Born: Paul Ayoub-Geday
- Education: American University in Cairo; London Film School
- Occupations: Publisher, photographer, filmmaker, visual artist

Paul Ayoub-Geday (Arabic: بالعيب جدي) is an Egyptian publisher, photographer, filmmaker and visual artist. He has worked as light and set designer, photo editor, creative director, journalist, publisher and curator.

== Background ==
Geday holds a master's degree in mass communication from the American University in Cairo where he studied from 1987 to 1989. Also, he studied at the London Film School from 1991 to 1993 .

Geday is an active member of the Contemporary Image Collective (CIC) as member of the board of trustees since January 2005 (see next section). Also, he is a consultant and a trainer in the conception of magazine and newspaper at the Media Development Program (MDP) where he started working in August 2010. He has been a consultant and a trainer too at the International Center for Journalists (ICFJ) since March 2010 till now. Also, Geday has worked at Tanmeya, a company for Financial Services Industry, as film director and consultant from July till August 2010.

== About the Contemporary Image Collective ==
Geday worked on the board of trustees of the Contemporary Image Collective (CIC) as Secretary. It is a non-profit independent art initiative founded in 2004 in Egypt. It provides educational programs in art and media through workshops and courses at the CIC PhotoSchool. The initiative's mission is to provide art practices that "reflect and respond to the present".

== Geday and Almanac Egypt ==
Geday conceived, published and art directed Almanac Egypt in 2001. It is a yearly publication that has information about a wide variety of aspects about Egypt that he co-published with Max Rodenbeck. It includes articles, graphs and lists. The book has six chapters: industry, land, culture, society, politics, and economy. Each chapter contains articles written by professional journalists and researchers in Egypt. For instance, Almanac Egypt 2002–2003 contains 125 articles, 244 pictures, 113 graphs, tables, and maps.

== Geday the filmmaker ==
Geday participated in The Self-portrait Video Workshop by Corinne van Egeraat produced by ZINdoc Company in 2011. Seventeen short autobiographical movies were produced by Egyptian artists. It was organized by the Townhouse Gallery in Cairo and the Embassy of the Kingdom of the Netherlands supported the project. The Egyptian premiere of the movies was held at the French Cultural Centre in Cairo at "Rencontres de l'Image 2012" Festival from 2 to 9 April 2012. Geday made two movies during the workshop: I Don't Know and Bye Bye. The latter was the only film to have an international premiere in Berlin.

In his film I Don't Know, Geday showed old pictures of his family, accompanied by comments about them. It was filmed inside his family's old apartment. The old pictures represented memories that he had imprisoned for a long time. His five-minute short movie Bye Bye was part of the same self-portrait workshop. Through this movie, he freed himself from cumulative memories. Bye Bye premiered at the 62nd edition of Berlin International Film Festival in Berlin in 2012.

== Geday the curator ==
Geday curated art exhibitions such as "The Other Half" and "Futuropolis". The first took place in January 2003 at Mahrabiya gallery in Cairo, where the contributors to Egypt Almanac exhibited their works. A slideshow displayed digital photos without stopping, for the whole duration of the gallery. Tarek Atia, writer and editor, and photographers like Randa Shaath and Sherif Sonbol displayed their works, among other artists.

As for "Futuropolis", it was an exhibition of photos that took place in December 2010 from Tuesday 14th till Thursday 30th at Saad Zaghloul Culture Center in Cairoat Saad Zaghloul Culture Center in Cairo. Geday chose to display works about Cairo, while focusing on what it could possibly come to be in the future. Geday believes that an artist living in Cairo will tend to have most of his works about this city, as it is beautiful and captivating. Geday displayed Facebook photos of his at Futuropolis exhibition. Those were sketches of tools as well as photos depicting the preparation of an evening meal. Other photographers such as the Xenia Nikolsyaka, Tarek Hefny and Nermine Al-Ansari displayed their works at Futuropolis exhibition (Krajeski).

== List of works ==
- April 2012: I Don't Know (movie, 4:40 minutes)
- April 2012: Bye Bye (movie, 5:50 minutes)
- December 2010: "Futuropolis" Exhibition
- October 2004: Almanac Egypt 2002–2003: The Encyclopedia of Modern Egypt
- January 2003: "The Other Half" Exhibition
- November 2001: Almanac Egypt's 2001: A Yearly Review of the Egyptian Scene
