= Bazargan, Afghanistan =

Place in Afghanistan

Bazargan
- Location in Afghanistan
- Coordinates: 34°21′15″N 62°00′18″E
- Country: Afghanistan
- Province: Herat Province
- Time zone: UTC+4:30

Bazargan (Persian: بازرگان, also Romanized as Bāzargān, Bazirgun, or Bāzergūn) is a village in Herat Province, Afghanistan.

== See also ==
- Herat Province
