= Shahrak-e Bazargan =

Shahrak-e Bazargan شهرك بازرگان
- Village
- Location within Iran
- Coordinates: 28°40′06″N 55°13′21″E
- Country: Iran
- Province: Fars
- County: Darab
- Bakhsh: Rostaq
- Rural District: Kuhestan

Population (2006)
  - Total: 248
- Time zone: UTC+3:30 (IRST)
  - Summer (DST): UTC+4:30 (IRDT)

Shahrak-e Bazargan (Persian: شهرك بازرگان, also Romanized as Shahrak-e Bāzargān; also known as Bāzargān) is a village in Kuhestan Rural District, Rostaq District, Darab County, Fars province, Iran. At the 2006 census, its population was 248, in 68 families.
