= Qaleh Juq-e Sofla =

Qaleh Juq-e Sofla قلعه جوق سفلي
- Village
- Location within Iran
- Coordinates: 37°33′21″N 46°42′51″E
- Country: Iran
- Province: East Azerbaijan
- County: Bostanabad
- Bakhsh: Tekmeh Dash
- Rural District: Sahandabad

Population (2006)
  - Total: 75
- Time zone: UTC+3:30 (IRST)
  - Summer (DST): UTC+4:30 (IRDT)

Qaleh Juq-e Sofla (Persian: قلعه جوق سفلي, also Romanized as Qal‘eh Jūq-e Soflá; also known as Qal‘eh Jūq-e Pā'īn) is a village in Sahandabad Rural District, Tekmeh Dash District, Bostanabad County, East Azerbaijan Province, Iran. At the 2006 census, its population was 75, in 17 families.
