= Qaleh Juq, Kurdistan =

Qaleh Juq Qela Çuxe, قه‌ڵا چوخە, Qala Chukha
- Village
- Location within Iran
- Coordinates: 35°27′04″N 46°39′03″E
- Country: Iran
- Province: Kurdistan
- County: Sanandaj
- Bakhsh: Kalatrazan
- Rural District: Kalatrazan

Population (2006)
  - Total: 212
- Time zone: UTC+3:30 (IRST)
  - Summer (DST): UTC+4:30 (IRDT)

Qela Çuxe (Persian: قلاچوخه, also Romanized as Qala Chukha is a village in Kalatrazan Rural District, Kalatrazan District, Sanandaj County, Kurdistan Province, Iran. At the 2006 census, its population was 212, in 53 families. The village is populated by Kurds.
