= Qaleh Juq, Hashtrud =

Qaleh Juq قلعه جوق
- Village
- Location within Iran
- Coordinates: 37°27′22″N 46°54′40″E
- Country: Iran
- Province: East Azerbaijan
- County: Hashtrud
- Bakhsh: Central
- Rural District: Qaranqu

Population (2006)
  - Total: 22
- Time zone: UTC+3:30 (IRST)
  - Summer (DST): UTC+4:30 (IRDT)

Qaleh Juq (Persian: قلعه جوق, also Romanized as Qal‘eh Jūq) is a village in Qaranqu Rural District, in the Central District of Hashtrud County, East Azerbaijan Province, Iran. At the 2006 census, its population was 22, in 5 families.
