= Qaleh Juq, Naqadeh =

Qaleh Juq قلعه جوق
- Village
- Location within Iran
- Coordinates: 36°58′46″N 45°20′22″E
- Country: Iran
- Province: West Azerbaijan
- County: Naqadeh
- Bakhsh: Central
- Rural District: Solduz

Population (2006)
  - Total: 158
- Time zone: UTC+3:30 (IRST)
  - Summer (DST): UTC+4:30 (IRDT)

Qaleh Juq (Persian: قلعه جوق, also Romanized as Qal‘eh Jūq and Qal‘eh-ye Jūq; also known as Qal‘a Jukh and Qal‘eh Jūg) is a village in Solduz Rural District, in the Central District of Naqadeh County, West Azerbaijan Province, Iran. At the 2006 census, its population was 158, in 37 families.
