= Qaleh Jiq, East Azerbaijan =

Qaleh Jiq قلعه جيق
- Village
- Location within Iran
- Coordinates: 38°38′13″N 47°11′56″E
- Country: Iran
- Province: East Azerbaijan
- County: Ahar
- Bakhsh: Hurand
- Rural District: Dikleh

Population (2006)
  - Total: 50
- Time zone: UTC+3:30 (IRST)
  - Summer (DST): UTC+4:30 (IRDT)

Qaleh Jiq (Persian: قلعه جيق, also Romanized as Qal‘eh Jīq and Qal‘ehjīq; also known as Qal‘eh Bīq, Qal‘eh Jeq, Qal’eh Jūq, and Qal‘eh-ye Jūq) is a village in Dikleh Rural District, Hurand District, Ahar County, East Azerbaijan Province, Iran. At the 2006 census, its population was 50, in 14 families.
