= Qaleh Juq, Malekan =

Village in East Azerbaijan province, Iran

Qaleh Juq Persian: قلعه جوق
- Village
- Location within Iran
- Coordinates: 37°10′25″N 46°09′41″E
- Country: Iran
- Province: East Azerbaijan
- County: Malekan
- District: Central
- Rural District: Gavdul-e Markazi

Population (2016)
  - Total: 1,863
- Time zone: UTC+3:30 (IRST)

Qaleh Juq (Persian: قلعه جوق) (Note: Also romanized as Qal‘eh Jūq; also known as Qal‘eh Jīq) is a village in Gavdul-e Markazi Rural District of the Central District in Malekan County, East Azerbaijan province, Iran.

== Demographics ==
=== Population ===
At the time of the 2006 National Census, the village's population was 1,935 in 487 households. The following census in 2011 counted 1,800 people in 508 households. The 2016 census measured the population of the village as 1,863 people in 592 households.
