= Qaleh Darrehsi Rural District =

Rural district in West Azerbaijan province, Iran

Qaleh Darrehsi Rural District Persian: دهستان قلعه دره سي
- Rural District
- Location within Iran
- Coordinates: 39°17′N 44°27′E
- Country: Iran
- Province: West Azerbaijan
- County: Maku
- District: Central
- Established: 1987
- Capital: Keshmesh Tappeh

Population (2016)
  - Total: 13,962
- Time zone: UTC+3:30 (IRST)

Qaleh Darrehsi Rural District (Persian: دهستان قلعه دره سي) is in the Central District of Maku County, West Azerbaijan province, Iran. Its capital is the village of Keshmesh Tappeh.

== Demographics ==
=== Population ===
At the time of the 2006 National Census, the rural district's population was 12,161 in 2,708 households. There were 11,743 inhabitants in 3,128 households at the following census of 2011. The 2016 census measured the population of the rural district as 13,962 in 3,908 households. The most populous of its 48 villages was Keshmesh Tappeh, with 4,046 people.

=== Other villages in the rural district ===
- Baghcheh Juq
- Bashkand
- Danaluy-e Bozorg
- Kajut
- Kusaj
- Qaleh Juq
- Sangar
