= Bazargan District =

District in West Azerbaijan province, Iran

Bazargan District Persian: بخش بازرگان
- District
- Location within Iran
- Coordinates: 39°34′N 44°33′E
- Country: Iran
- Province: West Azerbaijan
- County: Maku
- Established: 2007
- Capital: Bazargan

Population (2016)
  - Total: 19,676
- Time zone: UTC+3:30 (IRST)

Bazargan District (Persian: بخش بازرگان) is in Maku County, West Azerbaijan province, Iran. Its capital is the city of Bazargan.

== History ==
In 2007, Chaybasar-e Shomali Rural District and the city of Bazargan were separated from the Central District in the formation of Bazargan District.

== Demographics ==
=== Population ===
At the time of the 2011 census, the district's population was 18,730 people in 4,486 households. The 2016 census measured the population of the district as 19,676 inhabitants in 5,519 households.

=== Administrative divisions ===
Bazargan District Population
Administrative Divisions	2011	2016
Chaybasar-e Shomali RD	4,908	4,961
Sari Su RD	4,271	4,736
Bazargan (city)	9,551	9,979
Total	18,730	19,676
RD = Rural District
