= Chaybasar-e Jonubi Rural District =

Rural district in West Azerbaijan province, Iran

Chaybasar-e Jonubi Rural District Persian: دهستان چايپاسار جنوبي
- Rural District
- Location within Iran
- Coordinates: 39°21′N 44°40′E
- Country: Iran
- Province: West Azerbaijan
- County: Maku
- District: Central
- Established: 1987
- Capital: Qarah Tappeh

Population (2016)
  - Total: 8,520
- Time zone: UTC+3:30 (IRST)

Chaybasar-e Jonubi Rural District (Persian: دهستان چايپاسار جنوبي) is in the Central District of Maku County, West Azerbaijan province, Iran. Its capital is the village of Qarah Tappeh.

== Demographics ==
=== Population ===
At the time of the 2006 National Census, the rural district's population was 10,148 in 2,004 households. There were 8,684 inhabitants in 2,127 households at the following census of 2011. The 2016 census measured the population of the rural district as 8,520 in 2,270 households. The most populous of its 43 villages was Adaghan, with 1,162 people.

=== Other villages in the rural district ===
- Hendvar
- Hesar
- Jaganluy-e Kord
- Qezel Dagh-e Ajam
- Qezel Dagh-e Kord
- Yaqub Ali Kandi
