= Chaybasar-e Shomali Rural District =

Rural district in West Azerbaijan province, Iran

Chaybasar-e Shomali Rural District Persian: دهستان چایپاسار شمالی
- Rural District
- Location within Iran
- Coordinates: 39°38′N 44°35′E
- Country: Iran
- Province: West Azerbaijan
- County: Maku
- District: Bazargan
- Established: 1987
- Capital: Qush

Population (2016)
  - Total: 4,961
- Time zone: UTC+3:30 (IRST)

Chaybasar-e Shomali Rural District (Persian: دهستان چایپاسار شمالی) is in Bazargan District of Maku County, West Azerbaijan province, Iran. Its capital is the village of Qush.

== Demographics ==
=== Population ===
At the time of the 2006 National Census, the rural district's population (as a part of the Central District) was 11,295 in 1,972 households. There were 4,908 inhabitants in 1,034 households at the following census of 2011, by which time the rural district had been separated from the district in the formation of Bazargan District. The 2016 census measured the population of the rural district as 4,961 in 1,254 households. The most populous of its 35 villages was Panjarlu, with 768 people.

=== Other villages in the rural district ===
- Alu Hajju
- Beri
- Gerik
- Gol Ali
- Haju
- Malham
- Surik
- Vali Kandi
