= Central District (Maku County) =

District in West Azerbaijan province, Iran

Central District (Maku County) Persian: بخش مرکزی شهرستان ماکو
- District
- Location within Iran
- Coordinates: 39°26′N 44°37′E
- Country: Iran
- Province: West Azerbaijan
- County: Maku
- Capital: Maku

Population (2016)
  - Total: 75,075
- Time zone: UTC+3:30 (IRST)

The Central District of Maku County (Persian: بخش مرکزی شهرستان ماکو) is in West Azerbaijan province, Iran. Its capital is the city of Maku.

== History ==
In 2007, Qarah Su Rural District was created in the district, and Chaybasar-e Shomali Rural District and the city of Bazargan were separated from it in the formation of Bazargan District.

== Demographics ==
=== Population ===
At the time of the 2006 census, the district's population was 84,516 in 19,238 households. The following census in 2011 counted 70,133 people in 18,427 households. The 2016 census measured the population of the district as 75,075 inhabitants in 21,490 households.

=== Administrative divisions ===
Central District (Maku County) Population
Administrative Divisions	2006	2011	2016
Chaybasar-e Jonubi RD	10,148	8,684	8,520
Chaybasar-e Shomali RD (Note: Transferred to Bazargan District)	11,295		
Qaleh Darrehsi RD	12,161	11,743	13,962
Qarah Su RD		6,955	6,012
Bazargan (city)	9,047		
Maku (city)	41,865	42,751	46,581
Total	84,516	70,133	75,075
RD = Rural District
