= Maku County =

County in West Azerbaijan province, Iran

Maku County Persian: شهرستان ماکو
- County
- Location of Maku County in West Azerbaijan province (top, yellow)

- Location of West Azerbaijan province in Iran
- Coordinates: 39°28′N 44°39′E
- Country: Iran
- Province: West Azerbaijan
- Capital: Maku
- Districts: Central, Bazargan

Population (2016)
  - Total: 94,751
- Time zone: UTC+3:30 (IRST)

Maku County (Persian: شهرستان ماکو) is in West Azerbaijan province, Iran. Its capital is the city of Maku.

== History ==
In 2007, Poldasht and Showt Districts were separated from the county in the establishment of Poldasht and Showt Counties, respectively. At the same time, Qarah Su Rural District was created in the Central District, and Chaybasar-e Shomali Rural District and the city of Bazargan were separated from it in the formation of Bazargan District. The new district was divided into two rural districts, including the new Sari Su Rural District.

== Demographics ==
=== Ethnicity ===
The predominant majority of the population consists of Shia Azerbaijanis with a significant minority of Sunni Kurds.

=== Population ===
At the time of the 2006 census, the county's population was 174,578 in 39,765 households. The following census in 2011 counted 88,863 people in 22,874 households. The 2016 census measured the population of the county as 94,751 in 27,009 households.

=== Administrative divisions ===
Maku County's population history and administrative structure over three consecutive censuses are shown in the following table.

Maku County Population
Administrative Divisions	2006	2011	2016
Central District	84,516	70,133	75,075
Chaybasar-e Jonubi RD	10,148	8,684	8,520
Chaybasar-e Shomali RD	11,295		
Qaleh Darrehsi RD	12,161	11,743	13,962
Qarah Su RD		6,955	6,012
Bazargan (city)	9,047		
Maku (city)	41,865	42,751	46,581
Bazargan District		18,730	19,676
Chaybasar-e Shomali RD		4,908	4,961
Sari Su RD		4,271	4,736
Bazargan (city)		9,551	9,979
Poldasht District (Note: Transferred to Poldasht County)	38,586		
Chaybasar-e Sharqi RD	6,132		
Gejlarat-e Gharbi RD	6,138		
Gejlarat-e Sharqi RD	6,578		
Zangebar RD	11,154		
Poldasht (city)	8,584		
Showt District (Note: Transferred to Showt County)	51,476		
Qarah Quyun-e Jonubi RD	13,931		
Qarah Quyun-e Shomali RD	6,170		
Yowla Galdi RD	11,616		
Showt (city)	19,759		
Total	174,578	88,863	94,751
RD = Rural District

== See also ==
Media related to Maku County at Wikimedia Commons
