= Shur Bolagh =

Shur Bolagh or Shurbolagh (Persian: شوربلاغ) may refer to various places in Iran:

- Shur Bolagh, Ardabil
- Shur Bolagh, Ravansar, Kermanshah Province
- Shur Bolagh, Sahneh, Kermanshah Province
- Shur Bolagh, Markazi
- Shur Bolagh, Chaldoran, West Azerbaijan Province
- Shur Bolagh, Khoy, West Azerbaijan Province
- Shurbolagh-e Olya, Poldasht County, West Azerbaijan Province
- Shurbolagh-e Sofla, Poldasht County, West Azerbaijan Province
