= Sayyet Askan Ashayir Milad =

Village in West Azerbaijan province, Iran

Sayyet Askan Ashayir Milad Persian: سايت اسكان عشايرميلاد
- Village
- Country: Iran
- Province: West Azerbaijan
- County: Poldasht
- District: Aras
- Rural District: Gejlarat-e Sharqi

Population (2016)
  - Total: 916
- Time zone: UTC+3:30 (IRST)

Sayyet Askan Ashayir Milad (Persian: سايت اسكان عشايرميلاد) (Note: Also romanized as Sāyyet Askān ʿAshāyīr Mīlād) is a village in Gejlarat-e Sharqi Rural District of Aras District in Poldasht County, West Azerbaijan province, Iran.

== Demographics ==
=== Population ===
At the time of the 2006 National Census, the village's population was 617 in 148 households, when it was in Zangebar Rural District of the former Poldasht District in Maku County. The following census in 2011 counted 872 people in 223 households, by which time the district had been separated from the county in the establishment of Poldasht County. The village was transferred to Gejlarat-e Sharqi Rural District of the new Aras District. The 2016 census measured the population of the village as 916 people in 219 households.
