= Qurshaqlu =

Qurshaqlu or Qurshoqlu (Persian: قورشاقلو) may refer to:

- Qurshaqlu, East Azerbaijan
- Qurshaqlu, West Azerbaijan
- Qurshaqlu, Khoy, West Azerbaijan Province
- Qurshaqlu, Urmia, West Azerbaijan Province
