= Moradluy =

Moradluy (Persian: مرادلوي) may refer to:

- Moradluy-e Olya
- Moradluy-e Sofla
- Moradluy-e Vosta
