= Shidi =

Village in West Azerbaijan province, Iran

Shidi Persian: شيدي
- Village
- Location within Iran
- Coordinates: 39°30′18″N 44°55′42″E
- Country: Iran
- Province: West Azerbaijan
- County: Poldasht
- District: Central
- Rural District: Chaybasar-e Sharqi

Population (2016)
  - Total: 881
- Time zone: UTC+3:30 (IRST)

Shidi (Persian: شيدي) (Note: Also romanized as Shīdī; also known as Shedī) is a village in Chaybasar-e Sharqi Rural District of the Central District in Poldasht County, West Azerbaijan province, Iran.

== Demographics ==
=== Population ===
At the time of the 2006 National Census, the village's population was 820 in 167 households, when it was in the former Poldasht District of Maku County. The following census in 2011 counted 1,000 people in 228 households, by which time the district had been separated from the county in the establishment of Poldasht County. The rural district was transferred to the new Central District. The 2016 census measured the population of the village as 881 people in 215 households. It was the most populous village in its rural district.
