= Gochlar =

Gochlar گچلر
- Village
- Location within Iran
- Coordinates: 38°59′16″N 45°15′57″E
- Country: Iran
- Province: West Azerbaijan
- County: Poldasht
- Bakhsh: Aras
- Rural District: Gejlarat-e Sharqi

Population (2006)
  - Total: 75
- Time zone: UTC+3:30 (IRST)
  - Summer (DST): UTC+4:30 (IRDT)

Gochlar (Persian: گچلر; also known as Gojlar) is a village in Gejlarat-e Sharqi Rural District, Aras District, Poldasht County, West Azerbaijan Province, Iran. At the 2006 census, its population was 75, in 13 families.
