= Hasan Kandi, Poldasht =

Village in West Azerbaijan province, Iran

Hasan Kandi Persian: حسن كندي
- Village
- Location within Iran
- Coordinates: 39°06′18″N 45°16′44″E
- Country: Iran
- Province: West Azerbaijan
- County: Poldasht
- District: Aras
- Rural District: Gejlarat-e Sharqi

Population (2016)
  - Total: 688
- Time zone: UTC+3:30 (IRST)

Hasan Kandi (Persian: حسن كندي) (Note: Also romanized as Ḩasan Kandī) is a village in Gejlarat-e Sharqi Rural District of Aras District in Poldasht County, West Azerbaijan province, Iran.

== Demographics ==
=== Population ===
At the time of the 2006 National Census, the village's population was 755 in 172 households, when it was in the former Poldasht District of Maku County. The following census in 2011 counted 797 people in 224 households, by which time the district had been separated from the county in the establishment of Poldasht County. The rural district was transferred to the new Aras District. The 2016 census measured the population of the village as 688 people in 226 households.
