= Incheh Darrehsi =

Incheh Darrehsi اينچه دره سي
- Village
- Location within Iran
- Coordinates: 39°04′22″N 45°14′26″E
- Country: Iran
- Province: West Azerbaijan
- County: Poldasht
- Bakhsh: Aras
- Rural District: Gejlarat-e Sharqi

Population (2006)
  - Total: 84
- Time zone: UTC+3:30 (IRST)
  - Summer (DST): UTC+4:30 (IRDT)

Incheh Darrehsi (Persian: اينچه دره سي, also Romanized as Īncheh Darrehsī and Īncheh Darrahsī) is a village in Gejlarat-e Sharqi Rural District, Aras District, Poldasht County, West Azerbaijan Province, Iran. At the 2006 census, its population was 84, in 17 families.
