= Hajji Sufi =

Hajji Sufi حاجي صوفي
- Village
- Location within Iran
- Coordinates: 39°15′20″N 44°57′14″E
- Country: Iran
- Province: West Azerbaijan
- County: Poldasht
- Bakhsh: Central
- Rural District: Zangebar

Population (2006)
  - Total: 87
- Time zone: UTC+3:30 (IRST)
  - Summer (DST): UTC+4:30 (IRDT)

Hajji Sufi (Persian: حاجي صوفي, also Romanized as Ḩājjī Şūfī) is a village in Zangebar Rural District, in the Central District of Poldasht County, West Azerbaijan Province, Iran. At the 2006 census, its population was 87, in 22 families.
