= Beyk Jan =

Village in West Azerbaijan province, Iran

Beyk Jan Persian: بيك جان
- Village
- Location within Iran
- Coordinates: 39°04′53″N 45°15′45″E
- Country: Iran
- Province: West Azerbaijan
- County: Poldasht
- District: Aras
- Rural District: Gejlarat-e Sharqi

Population (2016)
  - Total: 436
- Time zone: UTC+3:30 (IRST)

Beyk Jan (Persian: بيك جان) (Note: Also romanized as Beyk Jān; also known as Bāyjān, Bāyjān Gachlarāt, Bāyjān-e Gechlarāt, Beistan, Beygjān, and Bīstān) is a village in, and the capital of, Gejlarat-e Sharqi Rural District in Aras District of Poldasht County, West Azerbaijan province, Iran.

== Demographics ==
=== Population ===
At the time of the 2006 National Census, the village's population was 526 in 123 households, when it was in the former Poldasht District of Maku County. The following census in 2011 counted 558 people in 139 households, by which time the district had been separated from the county in the establishment of Poldasht County. The rural district was transferred to the new Aras District. The 2016 census measured the population of the village as 436 people in 135 households.
