= Aqamir Kandi =

Aqamir Kandi اقاميركندي
- Village
- Location within Iran
- Coordinates: 39°16′53″N 44°57′57″E
- Country: Iran
- Province: West Azerbaijan
- County: Poldasht
- Bakhsh: Central
- Rural District: Zangebar

Population (2006)
  - Total: 140
- Time zone: UTC+3:30 (IRST)
  - Summer (DST): UTC+4:30 (IRDT)

Aqamir Kandi (Persian: اقاميركندي, also Romanized as Āqāmīr Kandī) is a village in Zangebar Rural District, in the Central District of Poldasht County, West Azerbaijan Province, Iran. At the 2006 census, its population was 140, in 33 families.
