= Qurshaqlui-ye Kord =

Qurshaqlui-ye Kord قورشاقلوي كرد
- Village
- Location within Iran
- Coordinates: 39°04′46″N 45°11′07″E
- Country: Iran
- Province: West Azerbaijan
- County: Poldasht
- Bakhsh: Aras
- Rural District: Gejlarat-e Sharqi

Population (2006)
  - Total: 269
- Time zone: UTC+3:30 (IRST)
  - Summer (DST): UTC+4:30 (IRDT)

Qurshaqlui-ye Kord (Persian: قورشاقلوي كرد, also Romanized as Qūrshāqlūī-ye Kord; also known as Chatū Kandī and Shāh Pasand) is a village in Gejlarat-e Sharqi Rural District, Aras District, Poldasht County, West Azerbaijan Province, Iran. At the 2006 census, its population was 269, in 50 families.
