= Karamabad, Poldasht =

Village in West Azerbaijan province, Iran

Karamabad Persian: كرم آباد
- Village
- Location within Iran
- Coordinates: 39°04′26″N 45°04′39″E
- Country: Iran
- Province: West Azerbaijan
- County: Poldasht
- District: Aras
- Rural District: Gejlarat-e Gharbi

Population (2016)
  - Total: Below reporting threshold
- Time zone: UTC+3:30 (IRST)

Karamabad (Persian: كرم آباد) (Note: Also romanized as Karamābād; formerly known as Karimabad (كريم اباد), also romanized as Karīmābād) is a village in Gejlarat-e Gharbi Rural District (Note: Formerly Gejlarat Rural District) of Aras District in Poldasht County, West Azerbaijan province, Iran.

== Demographics ==
=== Population ===
At the time of the 2006 National Census, the village's population, as Karimabad, was 74 in 20 households, when it was in the former Poldasht District of Maku County. The village did not appear in the following census of 2011, by which time the district had been separated from the county in the establishment of Poldasht County. The rural district was transferred to the new Aras District and the village was listed as Karamabad. The 2016 census measured the population of the village as below the reporting threshold.
