= Agh Otluq =

Agh Otluq اغ اتلوق
- Village
- Location within Iran
- Coordinates: 39°20′12″N 44°57′45″E
- Country: Iran
- Province: West Azerbaijan
- County: Poldasht
- Bakhsh: Central
- Rural District: Zangebar

Population (2006)
  - Total: 344
- Time zone: UTC+3:30 (IRST)
  - Summer (DST): UTC+4:30 (IRDT)

Agh Otluq (Persian: اغ اتلوق, also Romanized as Āgh Otlūq; also known as Āghotlāq and Āg Otlūq) is a village in Zangebar Rural District, in the Central District of Poldasht County, West Azerbaijan Province, Iran. At the 2006 census, its population was 344, in 72 families.
