= Qeyqaj, West Azerbaijan =

Qeyqaj قيقاج
- Village
- Location within Iran
- Coordinates: 39°12′03″N 45°08′10″E
- Country: Iran
- Province: West Azerbaijan
- County: Poldasht
- Bakhsh: Central
- Rural District: Zangebar

Population (2006)
  - Total: 117
- Time zone: UTC+3:30 (IRST)
  - Summer (DST): UTC+4:30 (IRDT)

Qeyqaj (Persian: قيقاج, also Romanized as Qeyqāj; also known as Qīqāch) is a village in Zangebar Rural District, in the Central District of Poldasht County, West Azerbaijan Province, Iran. At the 2006 census, its population was 117, in 27 families.
