= Bohlulabad, Poldasht =

Village in West Azerbaijan province, Iran

Bohlulabad Persian: بهلول اباد
- Village
- Location within Iran
- Coordinates: 39°13′44″N 44°59′42″E
- Country: Iran
- Province: West Azerbaijan
- County: Poldasht
- District: Central
- Rural District: Zangebar

Population (2016)
  - Total: 1,326
- Time zone: UTC+3:30 (IRST)

Bohlulabad (Persian: بهلول اباد) (Note: Also romanized as Bahlūlābād, Bohlool Abad, and Bohlūlābād; also known as Tāzehkand) is a village in, and the capital of, Zangebar Rural District in the Central District of Poldasht County, West Azerbaijan province, Iran.

== Demographics ==
=== Population ===
At the time of the 2006 National Census, the village's population was 1,383 in 304 households, when it was in the former Poldasht District of Maku County. The following census in 2011 counted 1,417 people in 385 households, by which time the district had been separated from the county in the establishment of Poldasht County. The rural district was transferred to the new Central District. The 2016 census measured the population of the village as 1,326 people in 419 households. It was the most populous village in its rural district.
