= Oruj-e Mohammad =

Village in West Azerbaijan province, Iran

Oruj-e Mohammad Persian: اروج محمد
- Village
- Location within Iran
- Coordinates: 39°16′06″N 45°01′38″E
- Country: Iran
- Province: West Azerbaijan
- County: Poldasht
- District: Central
- Rural District: Zangebar

Population (2016)
  - Total: 432
- Time zone: UTC+3:30 (IRST)

Oruj-e Mohammad (Persian: اروج محمد) (Note: Also romanized as Orūj Moḩammad, Orūj Mohamm’d and Orūj-e Moḩammad; formerly known as Oruj-e Mohammad Kandi (اروج محمدكندي), also romanized as Orūj-e Moḩammad Kandī and Orūj Mohamm’d Kandī; also known as Arooh Mohammad, Druj Muhammad-Kend, Druj Muhammadkand, Ūrūi Moḩammad Kandī, Orūj Kand, and Oruj Muhammad-Kend) is a village in Zangebar Rural District of the Central District in Poldasht County, West Azerbaijan province, Iran.

== Demographics ==
=== Population ===
At the time of the 2006 National Census, the village's population, as Oruj-e Mohammad Kandi, was 531 in 119 households, when it was in the former Poldasht District of Maku County. The following census in 2011 counted 478 people in 123 households, by which time the district had been separated from the county in the establishment of Poldasht County. The rural district was transferred to the new Central District and the village was listed as Oruj-e Mohammad. The 2016 census measured the population of the village as 432 people in 113 households.
