= Panah Kandi =

Panah Kandi پناه كندي
- Village
- Location within Iran
- Coordinates: 39°16′18″N 45°01′51″E
- Country: Iran
- Province: West Azerbaijan
- County: Poldasht
- Bakhsh: Central
- Rural District: Zangebar

Population (2006)
  - Total: 248
- Time zone: UTC+3:30 (IRST)
  - Summer (DST): UTC+4:30 (IRDT)

Panah Kandi (Persian: پناه كندي, also Romanized as Panāh Kandī) is a village in Zangebar Rural District, in the Central District of Poldasht County, West Azerbaijan Province, Iran. At the 2006 census, its population was 248, in 69 families.
