= Shahrak-e Aras =

Village in West Azerbaijan province, Iran

Shahrak-e Aras Persian: شهرك ارس
- Village
- Location within Iran
- Coordinates: 39°07′07″N 45°18′22″E
- Country: Iran
- Province: West Azerbaijan
- County: Poldasht
- District: Aras
- Rural District: Gejlarat-e Sharqi

Population (2016)
  - Total: 1,888
- Time zone: UTC+3:30 (IRST)

Shahrak-e Aras (Persian: شهرك ارس) (Note: Also known as Shahrak; formerly known as Shahrak-e Sadāras (شهرک سد ارس)) is a village in Gejlarat-e Sharqi Rural District of Aras District in Poldasht County, West Azerbaijan province, Iran.

== Demographics ==
=== Population ===
At the time of the 2006 National Census, the village's population was 1,951 in 481 households, when it was in the former Poldasht District of Maku County. The following census in 2011 counted 1,821 people in 511 households, by which time the district had been separated from the county in the establishment of Poldasht County. The rural district was transferred to the new Aras District. The 2016 census measured the population of the village as 1,888 people in 537 households. It was the most populous village in its rural district.
