= Daylan Kandi =

Village in West Azerbaijan province, Iran

Daylan Kandi Persian: دايلان كندي
- Village
- Location within Iran
- Coordinates: 39°19′57″N 45°02′25″E
- Country: Iran
- Province: West Azerbaijan
- County: Poldasht
- District: Central
- Rural District: Zangebar

Population (2016)
  - Total: 1,069
- Time zone: UTC+3:30 (IRST)

Daylan Kandi (Persian: دايلان كندي) (Note: Also romanized as Dāylān Kandī) is a village in Zangebar Rural District of the Central District in Poldasht County, West Azerbaijan province, Iran.

== Demographics ==
=== Population ===
At the time of the 2006 National Census, the village's population was 965 in 180 households, when it was in the former Poldasht District of Maku County. The following census in 2011 counted 1,132 people in 250 households, by which time the district had been separated from the county in the establishment of Poldasht County. The rural district was transferred to the new Central District. The 2016 census measured the population of the village as 1,069 people in 254 households.
