= Quch Kandi, Poldasht =

Village in West Azerbaijan province, Iran

Quch Kandi Persian: قوچ كندي
- Village
- Location within Iran
- Coordinates: 39°03′43″N 45°09′00″E
- Country: Iran
- Province: West Azerbaijan
- County: Poldasht
- District: Aras
- Rural District: Gejlarat-e Gharbi

Population (2016)
  - Total: 414
- Time zone: UTC+3:30 (IRST)

Quch Kandi (Persian: قوچ كندي) (Note: Also romanized as Qūch Kandī; also known as Kūch Kandī) is a village in Gejlarat-e Gharbi Rural District (Note: Formerly Gejlarat Rural District) of Aras District in Poldasht County, West Azerbaijan province, Iran.

== Demographics ==
=== Population ===
At the time of the 2006 National Census, the village's population was 1,086 in 219 households, when it was in the former Poldasht District of Maku County. The following census in 2011 counted 321 people in 84 households, by which time the district had been separated from the county in the establishment of Poldasht County. The rural district was transferred to the new Aras District. The 2016 census measured the population of the village as 414 people in 110 households.
