= Qaleh Juq, Poldasht =

Qaleh Juq قلعه جوق
- Village
- Location within Iran
- Coordinates: 39°00′03″N 45°17′23″E
- Country: Iran
- Province: West Azerbaijan
- County: Poldasht
- Bakhsh: Aras
- Rural District: Gejlarat-e Sharqi

Population (2006)
  - Total: 114
- Time zone: UTC+3:30 (IRST)
  - Summer (DST): UTC+4:30 (IRDT)

Qaleh Juq (Persian: قلعه جوق, also Romanized as Qal‘eh Jūq) is a village in Gejlarat-e Sharqi Rural District, Aras District, Poldasht County, West Azerbaijan Province, Iran. At the 2006 census, its population was 114, in 24 families.
