= Zakerlu =

Village in West Azerbaijan province, Iran

Zakerlu Persian: ذاكرلو
- Village
- Location within Iran
- Coordinates: 39°27′45″N 44°56′05″E
- Country: Iran
- Province: West Azerbaijan
- County: Poldasht
- District: Central
- Rural District: Chaybasar-e Sharqi

Population (2016)
  - Total: 538
- Time zone: UTC+3:30 (IRST)

Zakerlu (Persian: ذاكرلو) (Note: Also romanized as Z̄ākerlū) is a village in Chaybasar-e Sharqi Rural District of the Central District in Poldasht County, West Azerbaijan province, Iran.

== Demographics ==
=== Population ===
At the time of the 2006 National Census, the village's population was 521 in 103 households, when it was in the former Poldasht District of Maku County. The following census in 2011 counted 580 people in 129 households, by which time the district had been separated from the county in the establishment of Poldasht County. The rural district was transferred to the new Central District. The 2016 census measured the population of the village as 538 people in 127 households.
