= Pazi =

Village in West Azerbaijan province, Iran

Pazi Persian: پزي
- Village
- Location within Iran
- Coordinates: 39°25′41″N 44°57′30″E
- Country: Iran
- Province: West Azerbaijan
- County: Poldasht
- District: Central
- Rural District: Chaybasar-e Sharqi

Population (2016)
  - Total: 558
- Time zone: UTC+3:30 (IRST)

Pazi (Persian: پزي) (Note: Also romanized as Pazī and Pezī; formerly known as Pazik (پزيك), also romanized as Pazīk) is a village in Chaybasar-e Sharqi Rural District of the Central District in Poldasht County, West Azerbaijan province, Iran.

== Demographics ==
=== Population ===
At the time of the 2006 National Census, the village's population, as Pazik, was 522 in 95 households, when it was in the former Poldasht District of Maku County. The following census in 2011 counted 556 people in 114 households, by which time the district had been separated from the county in the establishment of Poldasht County. The rural district was transferred to the new Central District and the village was listed as Pazi. The 2016 census measured the population of the village as 558 people in 125 households.
