= Divankhaneh =

Village in West Azerbaijan province, Iran

Divankhaneh Persian: ديوانخانه
- Village
- Location within Iran
- Coordinates: 39°02′16″N 45°14′47″E
- Country: Iran
- Province: West Azerbaijan
- County: Poldasht
- District: Aras
- Rural District: Gejlarat-e Sharqi

Population (2016)
  - Total: 469
- Time zone: UTC+3:30 (IRST)

Divankhaneh (Persian: ديوانخانه) (Note: Also romanized as Dīvānkhāneh) is a village in Gejlarat-e Sharqi Rural District of Aras District in Poldasht County, West Azerbaijan province, Iran.

== Demographics ==
=== Population ===
At the time of the 2006 National Census, the village's population was 532 in 105 households, when it was in the former Poldasht District of Maku County. The following census in 2011 counted 544 people in 126 households, by which time the district had been separated from the county in the establishment of Poldasht County. The rural district was transferred to the new Aras District. The 2016 census measured the population of the village as 469 people in 132 households.
