= Mashhadi Mirza Kandi =

Village in West Azerbaijan province, Iran

Mashhadi Mirza Kandi Persian: مشهدي ميرزاكندي
- Village
- Location within Iran
- Coordinates: 39°13′01″N 45°06′15″E
- Country: Iran
- Province: West Azerbaijan
- County: Poldasht
- District: Central
- Rural District: Zangebar

Population (2016)
  - Total: 1,091
- Time zone: UTC+3:30 (IRST)

Mashhadi Mirza Kandi (Persian: مشهدي ميرزاكندي) (Note: Also romanized as Mashhadī Mīrzā Kandī; also known as Mīrzā Kandī) is a village in Zangebar Rural District of the Central District in Poldasht County, West Azerbaijan province, Iran.

== Demographics ==
=== Population ===
At the time of the 2006 National Census, the village's population was 836 in 194 households, when it was in the former Poldasht District of Maku County. The following census in 2011 counted 998 people in 249 households, by which time the district had been separated from the county in the establishment of Poldasht County. The rural district was transferred to the new Central District. The 2016 census measured the population of the village as 1,091 people in 269 households.
