= Ganeh Luy =

Village in West Azerbaijan province, Iran

Ganeh Luy Persian: گنه لوي
- Village
- Country: Iran
- Province: West Azerbaijan
- County: Poldasht
- District: Central
- Rural District: Chaybasar-e Sharqi

Population (2016)
  - Total: 499
- Time zone: UTC+3:30 (IRST)

Ganeh Luy (Persian: گينگور) (Note: Formerly known as Gingur (گنه لوي), also romanized as Gīngūr) is a village in Chaybasar-e Sharqi Rural District of the Central District in Poldasht County, West Azerbaijan province, Iran.

== Demographics ==
=== Population ===
At the time of the 2006 National Census, the village's population, as Gingur, was 498 in 87 households, when it was in the former Poldasht District of Maku County. The following census in 2011 counted 532 people in 132 households, by which time the district had been separated from the county in the establishment of Poldasht County. The rural district was transferred to the new Central District, and the village was listed as Ganeh Luy. The 2016 census measured the population of the village as 499 people in 113 households.
