= Torahmish =

Village in West Azerbaijan province, Iran

Torahmish Persian: تره ميش
- Village
- Location within Iran
- Coordinates: 38°56′48″N 45°17′29″E
- Country: Iran
- Province: West Azerbaijan
- County: Poldasht
- District: Aras
- Rural District: Gejlarat-e Sharqi

Population (2016)
  - Total: 234
- Time zone: UTC+3:30 (IRST)

Torahmish (Persian: تره ميش) (Note: Also romanized as Torahmīsh; formerly known as Tormish (ترميش), also romanized as Tormīsh; also known as Toryamesh) is a village in Gejlarat-e Sharqi Rural District of Aras District in Poldasht County, West Azerbaijan province, Iran.

== Demographics ==
=== Population ===
At the time of the 2006 National Census, the village's population, as Tormish, was 340 in 54 households, when it was in the former Poldasht District of Maku County. The following census in 2011 counted 184 people in 42 households, by which time the district had been separated from the county in the establishment of Poldasht County. The rural district was transferred to the new Aras District and the village was listed as Torahmish. The 2016 census measured the population of the village as 234 people in 57 households.
