= Eshqabad, West Azerbaijan =

Village in West Azerbaijan province, Iran

Eshqabad Persian: عشق اباد
- Village
- Location within Iran
- Coordinates: 39°18′29″N 44°54′24″E
- Country: Iran
- Province: West Azerbaijan
- County: Poldasht
- District: Central
- Rural District: Chaybasar-e Sharqi

Population (2016)
  - Total: 316
- Time zone: UTC+3:30 (IRST)

Eshqabad (Persian: عشق اباد) (Note: Also romanized as ‘Eshqābād; also known as Esmā‘īlābād) is a village in, and the capital of, Chaybasar-e Sharqi Rural District in the Central District of Poldasht County, West Azerbaijan province, Iran. The previous capital of the rural district was the village of Yowla Galdi, now a city in the Central District of Showt County.

== Demographics ==
=== Population ===
At the time of the 2006 National Census, the village's population was 278 in 65 households, when it was in the former Poldasht District of Maku County. The following census in 2011 counted 348 people in 77 households, by which time the district had been separated from the county in the establishment of Poldasht County. The rural district was transferred to the new Central District. The 2016 census measured the population of the village as 316 people in 82 households.
