= Moradlu =

Moradlu (Persian: مرادلو) may refer to various places in Iran:

- Moradlu, Bileh Savar, Ardabil Province
- Moradlu, Meshgin Shahr, Ardabil Province
- Moradlu, Hurand, East Azerbaijan Province
- Moradlu, Khoda Afarin, East Azerbaijan Province
- Moradlu-ye Olya, West Azerbaijan Province
- Moradlu-ye Sofla, West Azerbaijan Province
- Moradlu-ye Vosta, West Azerbaijan Province
- Moradlu District, in Meshgin Shahr County, Ardabil Province
