= Pileh Savar =

Village in West Azerbaijan province, Iran

Pileh Savar Persian: پيله سوار
- Village
- Location within Iran
- Coordinates: 39°12′10″N 45°01′47″E
- Country: Iran
- Province: West Azerbaijan
- County: Poldasht
- District: Central
- Rural District: Zangebar

Population (2016)
  - Total: 569
- Time zone: UTC+3:30 (IRST)

Pileh Savar (Persian: پيله سوار) (Note: Also romanized as Pīleh Savār; also known as Razvaliny Pilesevar) is a village in Zangebar Rural District of the Central District in Poldasht County, West Azerbaijan province, Iran.

== Demographics ==
=== Population ===
At the time of the 2006 National Census, the village's population was 402 in 90 households, when it was in the former Poldasht District of Maku County. The following census in 2011 counted 625 people in 153 households, by which time the district had been separated from the county in the establishment of Poldasht County. The rural district was transferred to the new Central District. The 2016 census measured the population of the village as 569 people in 144 households.

== See also ==
Persian empire
