= Nosratabad, West Azerbaijan =

Village in West Azerbaijan province, Iran

Nosratabad Persian: نصرت اباد
- Village
- Location within Iran
- Coordinates: 39°02′44″N 45°13′42″E
- Country: Iran
- Province: West Azerbaijan
- County: Poldasht
- District: Aras
- Rural District: Gejlarat-e Sharqi

Population (2016)
  - Total: 318
- Time zone: UTC+3:30 (IRST)

Nosratabad (Persian: نصرت اباد) (Note: Also romanized as Noşratābād; also known as Tapahsī Dalīk, Tapasi Dalik, Tappah Sīdalīk, Tappehsī Dalīk, and Tapsi Dalik) is a village in Gejlarat-e Sharqi Rural District of Aras District in Poldasht County, West Azerbaijan province, Iran.

== Demographics ==
=== Population ===
At the time of the 2006 National Census, the village's population was 388 in 82 households, when it was in the former Poldasht District of Maku County. The following census in 2011 counted 401 people in 98 households, by which time the district had been separated from the county in the establishment of Poldasht County. The rural district was transferred to the new Aras District. The 2016 census measured the population of the village as 318 people in 91 households.
