= Qir Kandi =

Qir Kandi قيركندي
- Village
- Location within Iran
- Coordinates: 39°13′14″N 45°06′11″E
- Country: Iran
- Province: West Azerbaijan
- County: Poldasht
- Bakhsh: Central
- Rural District: Zangebar

Population (2006)
  - Total: 291
- Time zone: UTC+3:30 (IRST)
  - Summer (DST): UTC+4:30 (IRDT)

Qir Kandi (Persian: قيركندي, also Romanized as Qīr Kandī) is a village in Zangebar Rural District, in the Central District of Poldasht County, West Azerbaijan Province, Iran. At the 2006 census, its population was 291, in 73 families.
