= Shir Mohammad =

Village in West Azerbaijan province, Iran

Shir Mohammad Persian: شيرمحمد
- Village
- Location within Iran
- Coordinates: 38°58′04″N 45°03′39″E
- Country: Iran
- Province: West Azerbaijan
- County: Poldasht
- District: Aras
- Rural District: Gejlarat-e Gharbi

Population (2016)
  - Total: 48
- Time zone: UTC+3:30 (IRST)

Shir Mohammad (Persian: شيرمحمد) (Note: Also romanized as Shīr Moḩammad) is a village in Gejlarat-e Gharbi Rural District (Note: Formerly Gejlarat Rural District) of Aras District in Poldasht County, West Azerbaijan province, Iran.

== Demographics ==
=== Population ===
At the time of the 2006 National Census, the village's population was 49 in 11 households, when it was in the former Poldasht District of Maku County. The following census in 2011 counted 56 people in 15 households, by which time the district had been separated from the county in the establishment of Poldasht County. The rural district was transferred to the new Aras District. The 2016 census measured the population of the village as 48 people in 14 households.
