= Purnak =

Village in West Azerbaijan province, Iran

Purnak Persian: پورناك
- Village
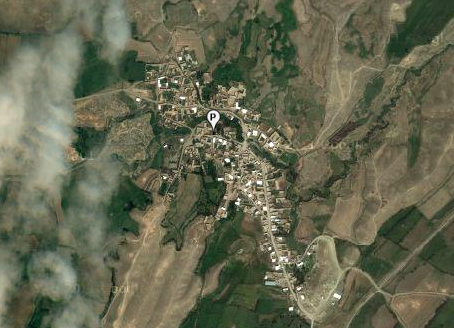
- Aerial view of Purnak

- Location within Iran
- Coordinates: 39°16′47″N 44°58′56″E
- Country: Iran
- Province: West Azerbaijan
- County: Poldasht
- District: Central
- Rural District: Zangebar

Population (2016)
  - Total: 455
- Time zone: UTC+3:30 (IRST)

Purnak (Persian: پورناك) (Note: Also romanized as Poornak and Pūrnāk; also known as Parnak) is a village in Zangebar Rural District of the Central District in Poldasht County, West Azerbaijan province, Iran.

== Demographics ==
=== Population ===
At the time of the 2006 National Census, the village's population was 599 in 150 households, when it was in the former Poldasht District of Maku County. The following census in 2011 counted 631 people in 178 households, by which time the district had been separated from the county in the establishment of Poldasht County. The rural district was transferred to the new Central District. The 2016 census measured the population of the village as 455 people in 143 households.
