= Chakhmaqlui-ye Sofla =

Village in West Azerbaijan province, Iran

Chakhmaqlui-ye Sofla Persian: چخماقلوي سفلي
- Village
- Location within Iran
- Coordinates: 39°02′58″N 45°06′24″E
- Country: Iran
- Province: West Azerbaijan
- County: Poldasht
- District: Aras
- Rural District: Gejlarat-e Gharbi

Population (2016)
  - Total: 1,687
- Time zone: UTC+3:30 (IRST)

Chakhmaqlui-ye Sofla (Persian: چخماقلوي سفلي) (Note: Also romanized as Chakhmāqlū’ī-ye Soflá) is a village in Gejlarat-e Gharbi Rural District (Note: Formerly Gejlarat Rural District) of Aras District in Poldasht County, West Azerbaijan province, Iran.

== Demographics ==
=== Population ===
At the time of the 2006 National Census, the village's population was 1,225 in 260 households, when it was in the former Poldasht District of Maku County. The following census in 2011 counted 1,675 people in 379 households, by which time the district had been separated from the county in the establishment of Poldasht County. The rural district was transferred to the new Aras District. The 2016 census measured the population of the village as 1,687 people in 395 households. It was the most populous village in its rural district.
