= Bahlul Kandi =

Village in West Azerbaijan province, Iran

Bahlul Kandi Persian: بهلول كندي
- Village
- Location within Iran
- Coordinates: 39°27′00″N 44°56′23″E
- Country: Iran
- Province: West Azerbaijan
- County: Poldasht
- District: Central
- Rural District: Chaybasar-e Sharqi

Population (2016)
  - Total: 804
- Time zone: UTC+3:30 (IRST)

Bahlul Kandi (Persian: بهلول كندي) (Note: Also romanized as Bahlūl Kandī) is a village in Chaybasar-e Sharqi Rural District of the Central District in Poldasht County, West Azerbaijan province, Iran.

== Demographics ==
=== Population ===
At the time of the 2006 National Census, the village's population was 717 in 150 households, when it was in the former Poldasht District of Maku County. The following census in 2011 counted 862 people in 200 households, by which time the district had been separated from the county in the establishment of Poldasht County. The rural district was transferred to the new Central District. The 2016 census measured the population of the village as 804 people in 183 households.
