= Karbalay Baqer =

Village in West Azerbaijan province, Iran

Karbalay Baqer Persian: کربلايي باقر
- Village
- Location within Iran
- Coordinates: 39°06′45″N 45°13′28″E
- Country: Iran
- Province: West Azerbaijan
- County: Poldasht
- District: Aras
- Rural District: Gejlarat-e Sharqi

Population (2016)
  - Total: 259
- Time zone: UTC+3:30 (IRST)

Karbalay Baqer (Persian: كربلاي باقر) (Note: Also romanized as Karbalāy Bāqer; formerly known as Karbalay Baqer Kandi (كربلاي باقركندي), also romanized as Karbalāy Bāqer Kandī; and ʿAdal Kandī) is a village in Gejlarat-e Sharqi Rural District of Aras District in Poldasht County, West Azerbaijan province, Iran.

== Demographics ==
=== Population ===
At the time of the 2006 National Census, the village's population, as Karbalay Baqer Kandi, was 243 in 52 households, when it was in the former Poldasht District of Maku County. The following census in 2011 counted 243 people in 56 households, by which time the district had been separated from the county in the establishment of Poldasht County. The rural district was transferred to the new Aras District and the village was listed as Adal Kandi. The 2016 census measured the population of the village as 259 people in 70 households, when it was listed as Karbalay Baqer.
