= Aziz Kandi =

Aziz Kandi (Persian: عزيزكندي) may refer to:

- Aziz Kandi, Ardabil
- Aziz Kandi, East Azerbaijan
- Aziz Kandi, West Azerbaijan
- Aziz Kandi, Bukan, West Azerbaijan Province
