= Qalanj Lanmesh =

Village in West Azerbaijan province, Iran

Qalanj Lanmesh Persian: قلنج لانمش
- Village
- Location within Iran
- Coordinates: 39°20′11″N 45°01′30″E
- Country: Iran
- Province: West Azerbaijan
- County: Poldasht
- District: Central
- Rural District: Zangebar

Population (2016)
  - Total: 1,063
- Time zone: UTC+3:30 (IRST)

Qalanj Lanmesh (Persian: قلنج لانمش) (Note: Also romanized as Qalanj Lānmesh; also known as Qelīnj Lānmīsh and Qeysh Lānmīsh) is a village in Zangebar Rural District of the Central District in Poldasht County, West Azerbaijan province, Iran.

== Demographics ==
=== Population ===
At the time of the 2006 National Census, the village's population was 855 in 183 households, when it was in the former Poldasht District of Maku County. The following census in 2011 counted 1,036 people in 264 households, by which time the district had been separated from the county in the establishment of Poldasht County. The rural district was transferred to the new Central District. The 2016 census measured the population of the village as 1,063 people in 262 households.
