= Shutlu =

Village in West Azerbaijan province, Iran

Shutlu Persian: شوطلو
- Village
- Location within Iran
- Coordinates: 39°32′34″N 44°54′13″E
- Country: Iran
- Province: West Azerbaijan
- County: Poldasht
- District: Central
- Rural District: Chaybasar-e Sharqi

Population (2016)
  - Total: 631
- Time zone: UTC+3:30 (IRST)

Shutlu (Persian: شوطلو) (Note: Also romanized as Shūţlū;; formerly known as Shotlu (شطلو), also romanized as Shoţlū; also known as Shtli (Kurdish: شتلی)) is a village in Chaybasar-e Sharqi Rural District of the Central District in Poldasht County, West Azerbaijan province, Iran.

== Demographics ==
=== Ethnicity ===
Kurds constitute the majority of the village's residents.

=== Population ===
At the time of the 2006 National Census, the village's population, as Shotlu, was 630 in 136 households, when it was in the former Poldasht District of Maku County. The following census in 2011 counted 723 people in 190 households, by which time the district had been separated from the county in the establishment of Poldasht County. The rural district was transferred to the new Central District and the village was listed as Shutlu. The 2016 census measured the population of the village as 631 people in 170 households.
