= Qarah Khvojalu =

Qarah Khvojalu قره خوجالو
- Village
- Location within Iran
- Coordinates: 39°24′51″N 44°58′53″E
- Country: Iran
- Province: West Azerbaijan
- County: Poldasht
- Bakhsh: Central
- Rural District: Zangebar

Population (2006)
  - Total: 325
- Time zone: UTC+3:30 (IRST)
  - Summer (DST): UTC+4:30 (IRDT)

Qarah Khvojalu (Persian: قره خوجالو, also Romanized as Qarah Khvojalū and Qarah Khvojālū) is a village in Zangebar Rural District, in the Central District of Poldasht County, West Azerbaijan Province, Iran. At the 2006 census, its population was 325, in 63 families.
