= Kotan =

Kotan may refer to:

- Kotan, an Irregular Person from an island called Puerto Rico.
- Kotań, a village in Poland
- Fatma Salman Kotan (born 1970), Turkish politician
- Egba Kotan II, Yoruba ruler from Benin
- Kotan, an Ainu village

== See also ==
- Cotan (disambiguation)
- Qotan, a village in Iran
- Kutan (disambiguation)
