= Ilanlu, West Azerbaijan =

Village in West Azerbaijan province, Iran

Ilanlu Persian: ايلانلو
- Village
- Location within Iran
- Coordinates: 39°03′20″N 45°17′32″E
- Country: Iran
- Province: West Azerbaijan
- County: Poldasht
- District: Aras
- Rural District: Gejlarat-e Sharqi

Population (2016)
  - Total: 336
- Time zone: UTC+3:30 (IRST)

Ilanlu (Persian: ايلانلو) (Note: Also romanized as Īlānlū) is a village in Gejlarat-e Sharqi Rural District of Aras District in Poldasht County, West Azerbaijan province, Iran.

== Demographics ==
=== Population ===
At the time of the 2006 National Census, the village's population was 414 in 85 households, when it was in the former Poldasht District of Maku County. The following census in 2011 counted 406 people in 100 households, by which time the district had been separated from the county in the establishment of Poldasht County. The rural district was transferred to the new Aras District. The 2016 census measured the population of the village as 336 people in 92 households.
