= Qarquluq-e Sofla =

Qarquluq-e Sofla قارقولوق سفلي
- Village
- Location within Iran
- Coordinates: 39°15′19″N 45°08′29″E
- Country: Iran
- Province: West Azerbaijan
- County: Poldasht
- Bakhsh: Central
- Rural District: Zangebar

Population (2006)
  - Total: 431
- Time zone: UTC+3:30 (IRST)
  - Summer (DST): UTC+4:30 (IRDT)

Qarquluq-e Sofla (Persian: قارقولوق سفلي, also Romanized as Qārqūlūq-e Soflá; also known as Ghar Gholoon Sofla, Qārqālūq-e Pā’īn, Qārqālūq-e Soflá, and Qārqūlūq-e Pā’īn) is a village in Zangebar Rural District, in the Central District of Poldasht County, West Azerbaijan Province, Iran. At the 2006 census, its population was 431, in 111 families.
