= Qarah Jalu =

Village in West Azerbaijan province, Iran

Qarah Jalu Persian: قره جالو
- Village
- Location within Iran
- Coordinates: 39°11′40″N 44°58′00″E
- Country: Iran
- Province: West Azerbaijan
- County: Poldasht
- District: Central
- Rural District: Zangebar

Population (2016)
  - Total: 508
- Time zone: UTC+3:30 (IRST)

Qarah Jalu (Persian: قره جالو) (Note: Also romanized as Qarah Jālū; also known as Qarah Jolū) is a village in Zangebar Rural District of the Central District in Poldasht County, West Azerbaijan province, Iran.

== Demographics ==
=== Population ===
At the time of the 2006 National Census, the village's population was 468 in 89 households, when it was in the former Poldasht District of Maku County. The following census in 2011 counted 497 people in 108 households, by which time the district had been separated from the county in the establishment of Poldasht County. The rural district was transferred to the new Central District. The 2016 census measured the population of the village as 508 people in 115 households.
