= Qutan, Iran =

Qutan قوطان
- Village
- Location within Iran
- Coordinates: 39°16′07″N 45°02′40″E
- Country: Iran
- Province: West Azerbaijan
- County: Poldasht
- Bakhsh: Central
- Rural District: Zangebar

Population (2006)
  - Total: 269
- Time zone: UTC+3:30 (IRST)
  - Summer (DST): UTC+4:30 (IRDT)

Qutan (Persian: قوطان, also Romanized as Qūţān) is a village in Zangebar Rural District, in the Central District of Poldasht County, West Azerbaijan Province, Iran. At the 2006 census, its population was 269, in 59 families.

== Name ==
According to Vladimir Minorsky, the name "Qutan" is derived from either the Turkic word qotan, meaning "an enclosure for sheep", or from the Mongolian word qutan, referring to the pelican.
