= Qarquluq =

Qarquluq (Persian: قارقولوق), also rendered as Qarqaluq or Qarqoloq or Karqalak or Karghuluk, also known as Ghar Gholoon, may refer to:

- Qarquluq-e Olya
- Qarquluq-e Sofla
