= Nazir Khan =

Nazir Khan may refer to:

- Nazir Ahmed Khan (1904-1983), Pakistani film actor, director and producer
- Ghagge Nazir Khan (c. 1850s–c. 1920s), Indian classical singer and founder of the Mewati gharana
- Nazeer Khan (c. 1860s –1920), Indian classical singer and founder of the Bhendibazaar gharana
- Nazir Ahmad Khan, Pakistani politician and member of the Provincial Assembly of the Punjab
- Nazir Ahmed Khan (politician), politician and former member of the All India Muslim League, National Assembly of Pakistan, and Jamaat-e-Islami Pakistan

== See also ==
- Nadir Khan or Mohammad Nadir Shah, king of Afghanistan, 1929–1933
- Nasir Khan (disambiguation)
- Nazar Khan (disambiguation)
- Nazim Khan or James Caan (businessman), British-Pakistani businessman and television personality
