= Qurshaqlu, West Azerbaijan =

Qurshaqlu قورشاقلو
- Village
- Location within Iran
- Coordinates: 39°05′48″N 45°10′52″E
- Country: Iran
- Province: West Azerbaijan
- County: Poldasht
- Bakhsh: Aras
- Rural District: Gejlarat-e Sharqi

Population (2006)
  - Total: 31
- Time zone: UTC+3:30 (IRST)
  - Summer (DST): UTC+4:30 (IRDT)

Qurshaqlu (Persian: قورشاقلو, also Romanized as Qūrshāqlū; also known as Ghoor Shaghloo, Kūrshāhelī, Kurshahli, Kurshakhli, Qūrshāqlī, Qūrshāqlū-ye Gaj Lavāt, and Qūrshōqlū) is a village in Gejlarat-e Sharqi Rural District, Aras District, Poldasht County, West Azerbaijan Province, Iran. At the 2006 census, its population was 31, in 8 families.
