= Nazok-e Sofla =

Village in West Azerbaijan province, Iran

Nazok-e Sofla Persian: نازك سفلي
- Village
- Location within Iran
- Coordinates: 39°00′02″N 45°06′56″E
- Country: Iran
- Province: West Azerbaijan
- County: Poldasht
- District: Aras
- Rural District: Gejlarat-e Gharbi

Population (2016)
  - Total: 285
- Time zone: UTC+3:30 (IRST)

Nazok-e Sofla (Persian: نازك سفلي) (Note: Also romanized as Nāzok-e Soflá; also known as Nāzīk-e Soflá and Nāzok-e Pā’īn) is a village in Gejlarat-e Gharbi Rural District (Note: Formerly Gejlarat Rural District) of Aras District in Poldasht County, West Azerbaijan province, Iran.

== Demographics ==
=== Population ===
At the time of the 2006 National Census, the village's population was 435 in 117 households, when it was in the former Poldasht District of Maku County. The following census in 2011 counted 353 people in 105 households, by which time the district had been separated from the county in the establishment of Poldasht County. The rural district was transferred to the new Aras District. The 2016 census measured the population of the village as 285 people in 95 households.
