= Shurbolagh-e Sofla =

Village in West Azerbaijan province, Iran

Shurbolagh-e Sofla Persian: شوربلاغ سفلي
- Village
- Location within Iran
- Coordinates: 39°22′35″N 44°53′20″E
- Country: Iran
- Province: West Azerbaijan
- County: Poldasht
- District: Central
- Rural District: Chaybasar-e Sharqi

Population (2016)
  - Total: 505
- Time zone: UTC+3:30 (IRST)

Shurbolagh-e Sofla (Persian: شوربلاغ سفلي) (Note: Also romanized as Shūrbolāgh-e Soflá) is a village in Chaybasar-e Sharqi Rural District of the Central District in Poldasht County, West Azerbaijan province, Iran.

== Demographics ==
=== Population ===
At the time of the 2006 National Census, the village's population was 516 in 97 households, when it was in the former Poldasht District of Maku County. The following census in 2011 counted 578 people in 126 households, by which time the district had been separated from the county in the establishment of Poldasht County. The rural district was transferred to the new Central District. The 2016 census measured the population of the village as 505 people in 110 households.
