= Abd ol Ali Kandi =

Village in West Azerbaijan province, Iran

Abd ol Ali Kandi Persian: عبدالعلي كندي
- Village
- Location within Iran
- Coordinates: 39°00′38″N 45°08′03″E
- Country: Iran
- Province: West Azerbaijan
- County: Poldasht
- District: Aras
- Rural District: Gejlarat-e Gharbi

Population (2016)
  - Total: 256
- Time zone: UTC+3:30 (IRST)

Abd ol Ali Kandi (Persian: عبدالعلي كندي) (Note: Also romanized as ‘Abd ol ‘Alī Kandī; formerly known as Allah Verdi Kandi (اله وردي كندي), also romanized as Allah Verdī Kandī) is a village in Gejlarat-e Gharbi Rural District (Note: Formerly Gejlarat Rural District) of Aras District in Poldasht County, West Azerbaijan province, Iran.

== Demographics ==
=== Population ===
At the time of the 2006 National Census, the village's population, as Allah Verdi Kandi, was 236 in 55 households, when it was in the former Poldasht District of Maku County. The following census in 2011 counted 260 people in 64 households, by which time the district had been separated from the county in the establishment of Poldasht County. The rural district was transferred to the new Aras District and the village was listed as Abd ol Ali Kandi. The 2016 census measured the population of the village as 256 people in 66 households.
