= Nazar Khan, West Azerbaijan =

Nazar Khan نظرخان
- Village
- Location within Iran
- Coordinates: 39°17′25″N 45°04′40″E
- Country: Iran
- Province: West Azerbaijan
- County: Poldasht
- Bakhsh: Central
- Rural District: Zangebar

Population (2006)
  - Total: 139
- Time zone: UTC+3:30 (IRST)
  - Summer (DST): UTC+4:30 (IRDT)

Nazar Khan (Persian: نظرخان, also Romanized as Naz̧ar Khān; also known as Razvaliny Nezerkhan) is a village in Zangebar Rural District, in the Central District of Poldasht County, West Azerbaijan Province, Iran. At the 2006 census, its population was 139, in 34 families.
