= Molla Kandi, Poldasht =

Molla Kandi ملاكندي
- Village
- Location within Iran
- Coordinates: 39°14′51″N 45°04′22″E
- Country: Iran
- Province: West Azerbaijan
- County: Poldasht
- Bakhsh: Central
- Rural District: Zangebar

Population (2006)
  - Total: 141
- Time zone: UTC+3:30 (IRST)
  - Summer (DST): UTC+4:30 (IRDT)

Molla Kandi (Persian: ملاكندي, also Romanized as Mollā Kandī) is a village in Zangebar Rural District, in the Central District of Poldasht County, West Azerbaijan Province, Iran. At the 2006 census, its population was 141, in 33 families.
