= Sakhteman, Poldasht =

Sakhteman ساختمان
- Village
- Location within Iran
- Coordinates: 39°13′02″N 45°03′07″E
- Country: Iran
- Province: West Azerbaijan
- County: Poldasht
- Bakhsh: Central
- Rural District: Zangebar

Population (2006)
  - Total: 152
- Time zone: UTC+3:30 (IRST)
  - Summer (DST): UTC+4:30 (IRDT)

Sakhteman (Persian: ساختمان, also Romanized as Sākhtemān) is a village in Zangebar Rural District, in the Central District of Poldasht County, West Azerbaijan Province, Iran. At the 2006 census, its population was 152, in 27 families.
