= Qutan =

Qutan may refer to:

- Qutan, Iran, a village in West Azerbaijan Province
- Qutan, Qinghai, a town in China
- Qutan, the Chinese variant of the given name Gautama
  - Gautama Siddha, also known as Qutan Xida (fl. 8th century), Chinese astronomer and astrologer

== See also ==
- Cutan (disambiguation)
- Kutan (disambiguation)
- Qotan, a village in East Azerbaijan Province, Iran
- Podvodnyye Islands, also known as Qutan Adası, a group of islands in Azerbaijan
- Qutang Gorge in China
