= Quch Kandi-ye Kord =

Village in West Azerbaijan province, Iran

Quch Kandi-ye Kord Persian: قوچ کندي کرد
- Village
- Location within Iran
- Coordinates: 39°03′24″N 45°09′17″E
- Country: Iran
- Province: West Azerbaijan
- County: Poldasht
- District: Aras
- Rural District: Gejlarat-e Gharbi

Population (2016)
  - Total: 821
- Time zone: UTC+3:30 (IRST)

Quch Kandi-ye Kord (Persian: قوچ کندي کرد) (Note: Also romanized as Qūch Kandī-ye Kord) is a village in Gejlarat-e Gharbi Rural District (Note: Formerly Gejlarat Rural District) of Aras District in Poldasht County, West Azerbaijan province, Iran.

== Demographics ==
=== Population ===
The village did not appear in the 2006 National Census. The following census in 2011 counted 711 people in 166 households. The 2016 census measured the population of the village as 821 people in 199 households.
