= Ali Nazer =

Ali Nazer or Ali Nazar (Persian: علي نظر) may refer to:

- Ali Nazer, Khuzestan
- Ali Nazar, West Azerbaijan
