= Ilanlu =

Ilanlu (Persian: ايلانلو) may refer to:

- Ilanlu, Azerbaijan
- Ilanlu, Hamadan, Iran
- Ilanlu, West Azerbaijan, Iran
