= Qarquluq-e Olya =

Qarquluq-e Olya قارقولوق عليا
- Village
- Location within Iran
- Coordinates: 39°16′59″N 45°06′58″E
- Country: Iran
- Province: West Azerbaijan
- County: Poldasht
- Bakhsh: Central
- Rural District: Zangebar

Population (2006)
  - Total: 258
- Time zone: UTC+3:30 (IRST)
  - Summer (DST): UTC+4:30 (IRDT)

Qarquluq-e Olya (Persian: قارقولوق عليا, also Romanized as Qārqūlūq-e ‘Olyā; also known as Ghar Gholoon Olya, Karghuluk, Kārqālāk Bālā, Qārqālūq Bālā, Qārqālūq-e Bālā, Qārqālūq-e ‘Olyā, Qārqoloq Bālā, and Qārqūlūq-e Bālā) is a village in Zangebar Rural District, in the Central District of Poldasht County, West Azerbaijan Province, Iran. At the 2006 census, its population was 258, in 65 families.
