= Ali Nazar, West Azerbaijan =

Village in West Azerbaijan province, Iran

Ali Nazar Persian: علي نظر
- Village
- Location within Iran
- Coordinates: 39°14′03″N 45°03′25″E
- Country: Iran
- Province: West Azerbaijan
- County: Poldasht
- District: Central
- Rural District: Zangebar

Population (2016)
  - Total: 412
- Time zone: UTC+3:30 (IRST)

Ali Nazar (Persian: علي نظر) (Note: Also romanized as ‘Alī Naz̧ar; also known as ‘Alī Naz̧ar ow ‘Emarāt, ‘Alī Naz̧ar va Emārat, and Alnazar) is a village in Zangebar Rural District of the Central District in Poldasht County, West Azerbaijan province, Iran.

== Demographics ==
=== Population ===
At the time of the 2006 National Census, the village's population was 466 in 122 households, when it was in the former Poldasht District of Maku County. The following census in 2011 counted 448 people in 133 households, by which time the district had been separated from the county in the establishment of Poldasht County. The rural district was transferred to the new Central District. The 2016 census measured the population of the village as 412 people in 130 households.
