= Sheybluy-e Olya, Poldasht =

Village in West Azerbaijan province, Iran

Sheybluy-e Olya Persian: شيبلوي عليا
- Village
- Location within Iran
- Coordinates: 39°10′31″N 45°12′41″E
- Country: Iran
- Province: West Azerbaijan
- County: Poldasht
- District: Aras
- Rural District: Gejlarat-e Sharqi

Population (2016)
  - Total: 258
- Time zone: UTC+3:30 (IRST)

Sheybluy-e Olya (Persian: شيبلوي عليا) (Note: Also romanized as Sheyblūy-e ‘Olyā; also known as Shebīlū-ye ‘Olyā and Sheyblū-ye Bālā) is a village in Gejlarat-e Sharqi Rural District of Aras District in Poldasht County, West Azerbaijan province, Iran.

== Demographics ==
=== Population ===
At the time of the 2006 National Census, the village's population was 276 in 64 households, when it was in the former Poldasht District of Maku County. The following census in 2011 counted 243 people in 68 households, by which time the district had been separated from the county in the establishment of Poldasht County. The rural district was transferred to the new Aras District. The 2016 census measured the population of the village as 258 people in 79 households.
