= Tappeh Bashi-ye Purnak =

Tappeh Bashi-ye Purnak تپه باشي پورناك
- Village
- Location within Iran
- Coordinates: 39°16′13″N 44°59′02″E
- Country: Iran
- Province: West Azerbaijan
- County: Poldasht
- Bakhsh: Central
- Rural District: Zangebar

Population (2006)
  - Total: 341
- Time zone: UTC+3:30 (IRST)
  - Summer (DST): UTC+4:30 (IRDT)

Tappeh Bashi-ye Purnak (Persian: تپه باشي پورناك, also Romanized as Tappeh Bāshī-ye Pūrnāk; also known as Tappeh Bāshī and Tappeh Bāshī-ye Pūnāk) is a village in Zangebar Rural District, in the Central District of Poldasht County, West Azerbaijan Province, Iran. At the 2006 census, its population was 341, in 66 families.
