= Shabiluy =

Shabiluy or Sheybluy (Persian: شيبلوي), also rendered as Shabilu or Sheyblu or Shebilu, may refer to:

- Shabiluy-e Olya (disambiguation)
- Shabiluy-e Sofla (disambiguation)
