= Aziz Kandi, West Azerbaijan =

Aziz Kandi عزيزكندي
- Village
- Location within Iran
- Coordinates: 39°03′50″N 45°11′24″E
- Country: Iran
- Province: West Azerbaijan
- County: Poldasht
- Bakhsh: Aras
- Rural District: Gejlarat-e Sharqi

Population (2006)
  - Total: 173
- Time zone: UTC+3:30 (IRST)
  - Summer (DST): UTC+4:30 (IRDT)

Aziz Kandi (Persian: عزيزكندي, also Romanized as ‘Azīz Kandī; also known as Ghaẕanfarābād) is a village in Gejlarat-e Sharqi Rural District, Aras District, Poldasht County, West Azerbaijan Province, Iran. At the 2006 census, its population was 173, in 31 families.
