= Kutan =

Kutan may refer to:

== Places in Iran ==
- Kutan-e Olya, a village in Takab County, West Azerbaijan Province
- Kutan-e Sofla, a village in Bijar County, Kurdistan Province

== People ==
- Köten (13th century), Cuman military leader
- Recai Kutan (born 1930), Turkish politician

== See also ==
- Ibn Ishaq, also known as ibn Kutan (8th century), Arab historian
- Cutan (disambiguation)
- Qutan (disambiguation)
- Kutang (disambiguation)
