= Diman =

Diman may refer to:

== Geographical locations ==
- Diman, Iran
- Diman, Nepal
- Deman, Azerbaijan
- Dimane, Lebanon

== Surname ==
- Byron Diman, American politician
- Mohamad Satim Diman, Malaysian politician
