= Awash =

Awash may refer to:

- Awash, Ethiopia, a town in Ethiopia
- Awash River, a river in Ethiopia
- Awash National Park, in Ethiopia
- Awash International Bank, in Ethiopia
- In nautical terminology, with water washing across the decks

== See also ==
- Avas, a hill of volcanic origin in Miskolc, Hungary
- Avaş, a village and municipality in the Yardymli District of Azerbaijan
