= Tappeh Bashi =

Tappeh Bashi (Persian: تپه باشي) may refer to:

- Tappeh Bashi, Ardabil
- Tappeh Bashi, West Azerbaijan
- Tappeh Bashi, Poldasht, West Azerbaijan Province
- Tappeh Bashi, Showt, West Azerbaijan Province
