= Givan, West Azerbaijan =

Village in West Azerbaijan province, Iran

Givan Persian: گيوان
- Village
- Location within Iran
- Coordinates: 39°03′29″N 45°02′37″E
- Country: Iran
- Province: West Azerbaijan
- County: Poldasht
- District: Aras
- Rural District: Gejlarat-e Gharbi

Population (2016)
  - Total: 717
- Time zone: UTC+3:30 (IRST)

Givan (Persian: گيوان) (Note: Also romanized as Gīvan and Gīvān; also known as Given) is a village in Gejlarat-e Gharbi Rural District (Note: Formerly Gejlarat Rural District) of Aras District in Poldasht County, West Azerbaijan province, Iran.

== Demographics ==
=== Population ===
At the time of the 2006 National Census, the village's population was 562 in 101 households, when it was in the former Poldasht District of Maku County. The following census in 2011 counted 637 people in 144 households, by which time the district had been separated from the county in the establishment of Poldasht County. The rural district was transferred to the new Aras District. The 2016 census measured the population of the village as 717 people in 165 households.
