= Givens =

Givens is a surname.

== Notable people ==
- Adele Givens, American comedy actress
- Bob Givens (1918–2017), American animator, character designer, and layout artist
- Charles J. Givens (1941–1998), American "get-rich-quick" author
- David Givens (born 1980), American football player
- Don Givens (born 1949), Irish football player and coach
- Donna Givens, American politician from Alabama
- Edward Givens (1930–1967), American astronaut
- Ernest Givens (born 1964), American football player
- Jack Givens (born 1956), American basketball player
- John Givens (1926–2009), American basketball player and coach
- Kevin Givens (born 1997), American football player
- Mychal Givens (born 1990), American baseball player
- Omm'A Givens (born 1975), American basketball player
- Philip Givens (1922–1995), Canadian politician and judge
- Reggie Givens (born 1971), American football player
- Robin Givens (born 1964), American actress
- Roy Givens (1929–2019), American politician
- Shay Givens (born 1976), Irish footballer
- Terryl Givens, American professor of literature and religion
- Wallace Givens (1910–1993), American mathematician

== See also ==
- Given (disambiguation), includes list of people with surname "Given"
