= Moradluy-e Olya =

Moradluy-e Olya مرادلوي عليا
- Village
- Location within Iran
- Coordinates: 39°18′28″N 44°56′45″E
- Country: Iran
- Province: West Azerbaijan
- County: Poldasht
- Bakhsh: Central
- Rural District: Chaybasar-e Sharqi

Population (2006)
  - Total: 147
- Time zone: UTC+3:30 (IRST)
  - Summer (DST): UTC+4:30 (IRDT)

Moradluy-e Olya (Persian: مرادلوي عليا, also Romanized as Morādlūy-e ‘Olyā; also known as Morādlū-ye Bālā and Morādlū-ye ‘Olyā) is a village in Chaybasar-e Sharqi Rural District, in the Central District of Poldasht County, West Azerbaijan Province, Iran. At the 2006 census, its population was 147, in 31 families.
