= Cutan =

Cutan may refer to:

- Cutan (polymer), a biopolymer found on the surface of some plants
- Cutan (soil), an element of the structure of soil
  - Clay cutan

== See also ==
- Kutan (disambiguation)
- Qutan (disambiguation)
