= Sakhteman =

Sakhteman (Persian: ساختمان) may refer to:

- Sakhteman-e Jahangir, Bushehr province
- Sakhteman-e Taher, Bushehr province
- Sakhteman, Fars
- Sakhteman, Khuzestan
- Sakhteman, Sistan and Baluchestan
- Sakhteman, Chaypareh, West Azerbaijan province
- Sakhteman, Poldasht, West Azerbaijan province
