= Allah Verdi Kandi =

Allah Verdi Kandi (Persian: الهوردي كندي) may refer to:

- Allah Verdi Kandi, Chaypareh
- Allah Verdi Kandi, Poldasht
