= Azerbaijan–Iran border =

International border

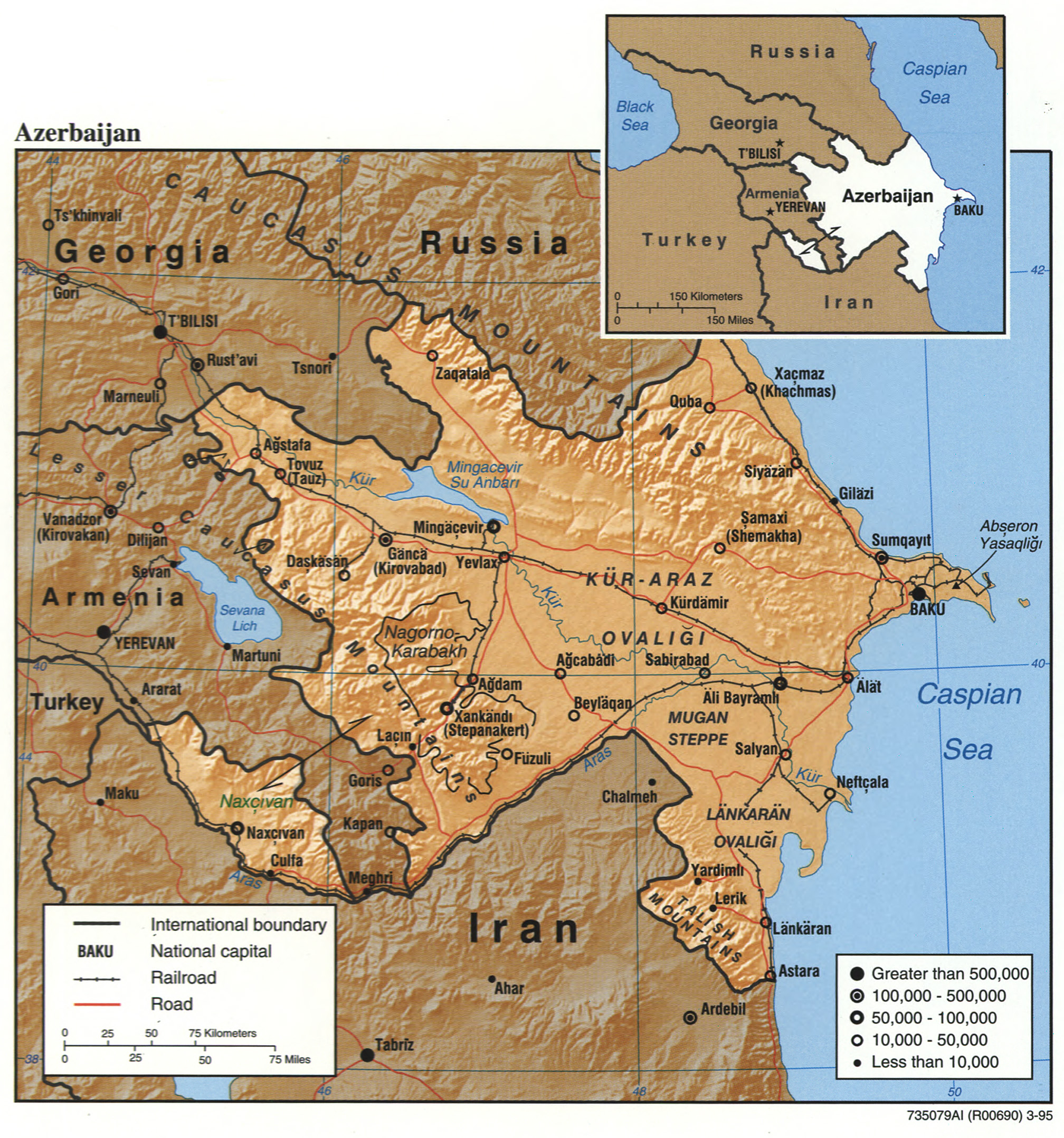
Map of Azerbaijan, with Iran to the south

Azerbaijani and Iranian boundary markers

The Azerbaijan–Iran border (Azerbaijani: Azərbaycan Respublikası–İran sərhədi, Persian: مرز آذربایجان و ایران) is 689 km (428 mi) in length and consists of two non-contiguous sections separated by the 44-km long Armenia–Iran border.

== Description ==
=== Western (Nakchivan) section ===
The border starts in the north-west at the tripoint with Turkey on the Aras river, continuing along this river south-eastwards, through the Aras reservoir (created by the Aras Dam) and down to the western Armenian tripoint.

=== Eastern section ===
The border starts in the west at the eastern Armenian tripoint on the Aras river, and then follows this river as it flows north-eastwards. The border leaves the river at a point south of Bəhramtəpə, turning sharply south-eastwards and proceeding across the Mugan plain to the Bolgarchay river. The border then follows this river south forming a broad S-shape. The river ends near Yardımlı, with the border then curving south-eastwards, proceeding overland in that direction through the Talysh Mountains, then turning east along the Astarachay river, following its course all the way to the Caspian Sea.

== History ==
During the 19th century the Caucasus region was contested between the declining Ottoman Empire, Persia and Russia, which was expanding southwards. By the Russo-Persian War (1804–1813) and the subsequent Treaty of Gulistan, Russia acquired the bulk of what is now Azerbaijan and parts of Armenia; a border was drawn which is the modern border between Iran and Azerbaijan (excluding the Nakhichevan section) and Iran and Armenia. Following the Russo-Persian War (1826–1828) and the Treaty of Turkmenchay Persia was forced to cede Nakhchivan and the rest of Armenia to Russia; the Aras was extended as the border up to the Ottoman tripoint, thus finalising what would become the Azerbaijan–Iran border.

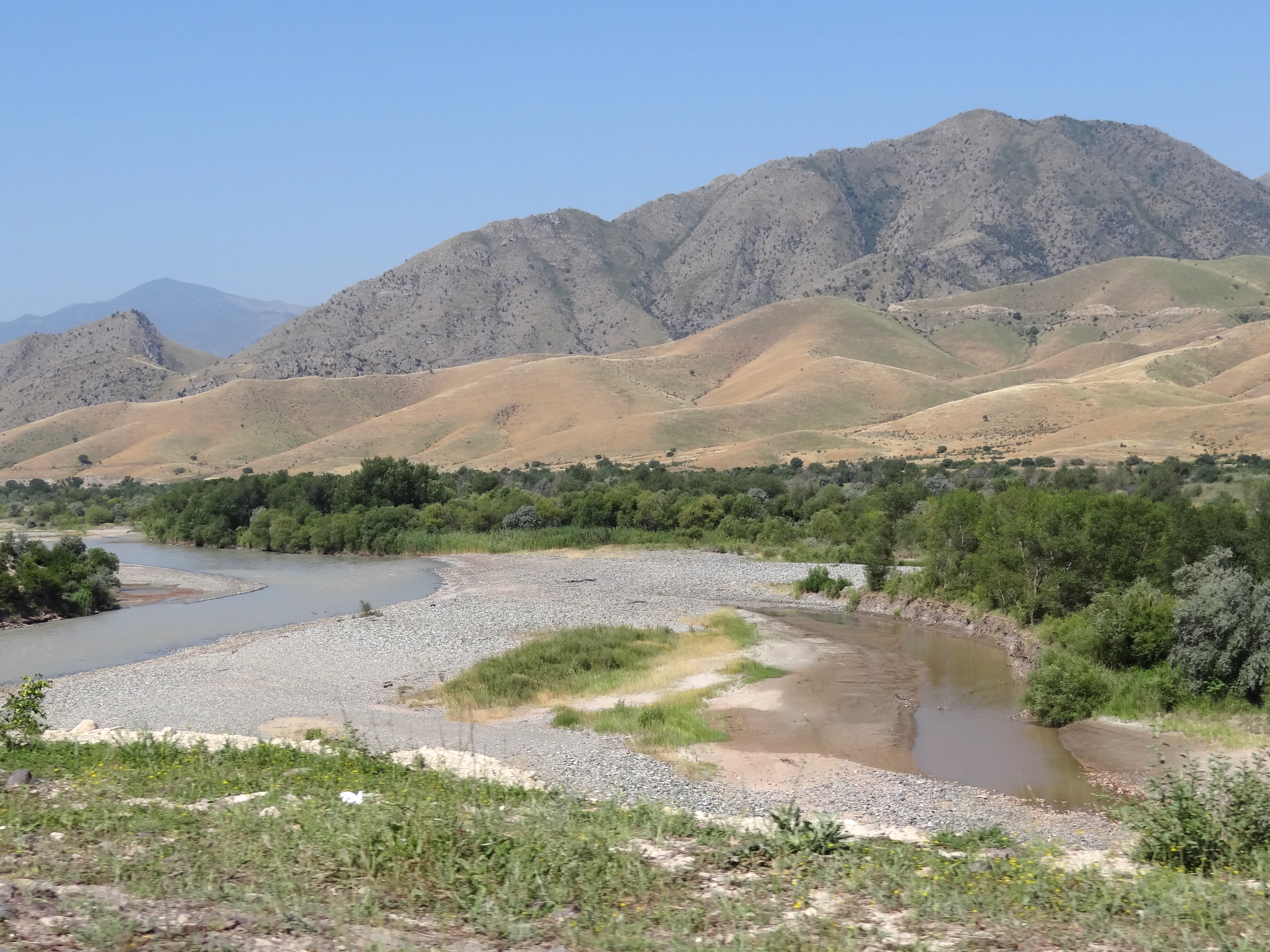
The Aras border, looking from Iran into Azerbaijan

During the First World War Russian Communists staged a successful revolution in 1917, whilst the peoples of the southern Caucasus had declared the Transcaucasian Democratic Federative Republic in 1918. Internal disagreements led to Georgia leaving the federation in May 1918, followed shortly thereafter by Armenia and Azerbaijan. By its very name the newly independent Azerbaijan caused tensions with Persia, as it seemed to imply a claim to Iran's Azerbaijan region. In 1920 Russia's Red Army invaded Azerbaijan and Armenia, ending the independence of both, followed shortly thereafter by Georgia. All three states were incorporated into the Transcaucasian SFSR within the USSR, before being separated in 1936. A Soviet-backed separatist state in Iranian Azerbaijan was established 1945 but was soon quashed by Iranian forces.

An Iran–USSR border convention in 1954 made some minor adjustments along the frontier in the Mugan plain and near Deman and Namin, to Iran's benefit. On-the-ground demarcation then followed, with a final agreement being agreed upon in 1957. In 1970 some further adjustments were made to the Nakhchivan section of the border following the creation of the Aras dam.

Following the collapse of the USSR in 1991 Azerbaijan gained independence and inherited its section of the Iran–USSR border. Iran quickly recognised the new state, though relations cooled over Iranian fears of Azerbaijan's potential claims to its territory as part of a 'Greater Azerbaijan', with Iran championing Armenia in the First Nagorno-Karabakh War. Following the war Armenia was left in control of the westernmost section of the 'mainland' Azerbaijan–Iran border. Relations between Iran and Azerbaijan have improved somewhat since the accession of Hassan Rouhani in Iran.

During the 2020 Nagorno-Karabakh War, Azerbaijan gained complete control of the western section of the border with Iran within one month from the self-proclaimed Republic of Artsakh, ultimately restoring Azerbaijani control over the border.

== Border crossings ==
Azeri name	Persian name	Type of crossing	location
Shahtakhti, (Nakhchivan A.R.)	Poldasht	road (Poldasht-Shah Takhti Bridge)	
Julfa, (Nakhchivan A.R.)	Jolfa	road and rail	
Biləsuvar	Bileh Savar	road	
Astara-South	Astara	road and rail	
Astara	Astara	road	

An additional border crossing is planned at Horadiz/Aslan Duz

== See also ==
- Azerbaijan–Iran relations
