= Nazok =

Nazok (Persian: نازك), also rendered as Nazik or Nasik, may refer to:

- Nazok-e Olya
- Nazok-e Sofla
