= Giving =

Giving may refer to:

- Gift, the transfer of something without the expectation of receiving something in return
- Generosity, the habit of giving freely without expecting anything in return
- Charity (practice), the giving of help to those in need who are not related to the giver
- Giving: How Each of Us Can Change the World, a book by Bill Clinton
- Giving (album), an album by Colm Ó Snodaigh

== See also ==
- Alternative giving, a form of gift-giving in which the giver makes a donation to a charitable organization in the recipient's name
- GAVE (disambiguation)
- Give (disambiguation)
- Given (disambiguation)
- The Giver, a novel by Lois Lowry
- Givers, an American indie rock band
