= Molla Kandi =

Molla Kandi (Persian: ملاكندي) may refer to:

- Molla Kandi, Ardabil
- Molla Kandi, Miandoab, West Azerbaijan Province
- Molla Kandi, Poldasht, West Azerbaijan Province
