= Deewana Main Deewana =

- Poster
- Directed by: K. C. Bokadia
- Screenplay by: K. C. Bokadia
- Story by: Vincent Selva
- Based on: Priyamudan (Tamil) by Vincent Selva
- Produced by: Amit Bokadia; Malook Nagar
- Starring: Govinda; Priyanka Chopra
- Cinematography: Amit Roy
- Edited by: Govind Dalwadi
- Music by: Bappi Lahiri
- Release date: 1 February 2013
- Country: India
- Language: Hindi

Deewana Main Deewana (transl. Obsessed, I'm Obsessed) is a 2013 Indian Hindi-language romantic crime thriller starring Govinda, Priyanka Chopra, Kader Khan, Prem Chopra, Johnny Lever and Shakti Kapoor directed by K. C. Bokadia. was shot in 2003 and wanted 2005 release due to delays it had a february 1 2013 release. The film was released worldwide on 1 February 2013. This film was shot approximately in 2003 but release was delayed for 10 years. The film is a Hindi remake of Tamil film Priyamudan (1998).

== Plot ==
Basant is a guy who gets what he wants, sneakily. He is friends with Vasant. At an antique shop, Basant and Vasant see an antique duck made of glass. Basant purposely drops to break it because the shopkeeper has reserved it for someone else. One day, Basant sees Priya and is head over heels in love with her. She proceeds to draw a smiley face on the glass frame. Basant tries to run after her, but he spots her earring. Meanwhile, Vasnat wants to enter a music competition, but on the way, their car hits a girl on a bike, who is Priya. She is in the hospital and requires A1B blood. However, Vasant is there (because the people who knocked her over took Vasant's car, so he chased them). Vasant has the correct blood type and donates blood to save Priya's life. However, this small event leads to the cancellation of the competition. Vasant is unaware that the girl Basant boasts about is Priya, the girl he knocked over. When Priya wants to contact Vasant to thank him for the blood donation, she unknowingly calls Basant, but he doesn't know it is the girl he wants. The next day, Basant and Vasant, along with Satya and Prakash, await the call, but a music group calls, insisting that Vasant must present himself there. Just after Vasant leaves, Priya calls but says that Vasant must meet her at the railway station in Jodhpur. She is wearing a blue cap, has a blue top, and is carrying an English novel. A call follows, and there is a problem with the boys, so Vasant has to leave. When Basant sees it is the girl he wants, he plays a pretext that he is Vasant instead. Basant goes home and finds his friend smoking and thinking about his guru because he is in the hospital. One day, Priya calls Basant's (Vasant's) house, but his mother picks up the phone. Her stupid sister blatantly says an old woman, and the mother thinks they are referring to her. Basant takes the phone and speaks expletives, unaware it is Priya. Vasant (the real one) goes for a music job; he has a cassette and meets Uncle ~Shakti Kapoor). He calls Priya to help him out. The plot thickens when, just before Vasant goes for the interview Basant tells him to change his name to Ranjini Priya for good luck, and he meets Priya. Both are unaware that Priya sees the boy who saved her life, and Vasant donates blood to a girl he didn't know because he never see her.

At the movies, Basant (as Vasant) goes with Priya, but he sees the real Vasant (his real friend) talking to Priya. He oversees the conversation, gets angry and drops his ice creams. He says that he's not in the mood to watch the movie so they leave. Priya meets the guys at their home (Vasant's). Prakash calls Basant (who is Vasant to Priya) the boys find out that Basant never told them about his girlfriend. One day Priya wants Basant (who is Vasant to her) to meet Ajit Singh, her father, but he lies and says his father is ill. The reason is that, when Ajit was pleading to save his daughter, Vasant shows up and says he'll be indebted to him. Basant realizes he saw Vasant so when the father sees him he will know it is not the guy who donated blood. At the airport, Priya and Ajit are waiting for the flight but secretly Basant sees them. He purposely procrastinates to delay time and rejects her calls. But when Ajit leaves Basant acts as if he reached late. Outside a guy pushes Priya, and Basant starts to beat him. Another day Basant calls Priya but he doesn't speak. He overhears Priya is going shopping. Basant calls after that and her father picks up. He says that he's in Hotel Heritage Room no. 448. But he return to Priya's house only to pretend if Uncle is there. But then a cop shows up and proclaims that Ajit is dead. Priya is heartbroken.

Sharad Kumar investigates the case. He says Ajit was murdered. Sharad immediately knows that Basant is the killer. This leads to the place where Ajit died. Meanwhile, Vasant shows up at Priya's house (the real one) and wants to meet Priya to say thank you. Basant goes to the hospital and tears the page with Priya's name on it. Vasant sees this and they start arguing. Both go to some rocky terrain to talk. Vasant realizes that Basant used his alias to win Priya's love. Basant gets angry and slaps Vasant. He loses his footing, but Basant catches him. But he loses his hand, and Vasant cascades to his doom. At the house of Basant, Sharad arrives, and he realizes Vasant is Basant. Priya finds out too. She runs away. Basant chases after her and says it is true 'I killed your father' and his friend but it wasn't his intention. Priya takes a log and attack Basant. Priya nails herself with the log. Cops show up and Sharad shoots Basant. The earring that Basant possessed falls. He says it is evidence of his love. Priya bursts into tears. Basant is sent to jail for 7 years. Later, Vasant is reborn on his honeymoon.

== Cast ==
- Govinda as Basant
- Priyanka Chopra as Priya Singh
- Nasir Khan as Vasant Kumar / Ranjini Priya
- Kader Khan as Shekhar Kumar, Basant's father
- Himani Shivpuri as Sheetal Kumar, Basant's mother
- Prem Chopra as Ajit Singh, Priya's father
- Johnny Lever as Jawan Singh
- Shakti Kapoor as Laxman Bhinde
- Sharat Saxena as Sharad Kumar

== Soundtrack ==
1. "Diwana Mai Diwana - Sukhwinder Singh, Shreya Ghoshal
2. "Judaa Na Honge Hum" - Sadhana Sargam, Udit Narayan
3. "Kala Doriya Kala Doriya" - Sudesh Bhosle, Ila Arun, Sunidhi Chauhan
4. "Ek Haseenaa Ek Deewana - Udit Narayan, Anuradha Paudwal
5. "Ek Rupaiya Deke" - Govinda, Bappi Lahiri, Ila Arun
6. "Panwa Pe Chuna Lagayenge (Remix)" - Vinod Rathod, Bappi Lahiri
7. "Panwa Pe Chunaa Lagayenge" - Vinod Rathod
8. Pyar nahin hai (not in film)-KK, Suchitra

== Title and other changes ==
The film was suggested to have a title change as Jung aur Mohabbat but it did not materialise. They planned to keep the title as Deewana Main Deewana.

== Critical reception ==
The Times of India gave the film 2.5 out of 5 stars saying "Lack of newness is a spoiler. You go to the theater, preparing yourself to sit through an 'old' film and thus, in spite of it being decently entertaining, it fails to grip your attention." Filmfare wrote, "Frankly speaking this movie should have been kept in the cans. Stay away from it, as it has nothing to offer in the theatre or at home".
