= Moradluy-e Vosta =

Moradluy-e Vosta مرادلوي وسطي
- Village
- Location within Iran
- Coordinates: 39°18′40″N 44°57′50″E
- Country: Iran
- Province: West Azerbaijan
- County: Poldasht
- Bakhsh: Central
- Rural District: Zangebar

Population (2006)
  - Total: 173
- Time zone: UTC+3:30 (IRST)
  - Summer (DST): UTC+4:30 (IRDT)

Moradluy-e Vosta (Persian: مرادلوي وسطي, also Romanized as Morādlūy-e Vosţá; also known as Morādlū-ye Vosţá) is a village in Zangebar Rural District, in the Central District of Poldasht County, West Azerbaijan Province, Iran. At the 2006 census, its population was 173, in 34 families.
