= Chaybasar =

Chaybasar (Persian: چايپاسار) may refer to:

- Chaybasar, Armenia
- Chaybasar-e Jonubi Rural District
- Chaybasar-e Sharqi Rural District
- Chaybasar-e Shomali Rural District
