= Nazik =

Nazik may refer to:

== Given name ==
- Nazik al-Abid (1887–1959), Syrian activist
- Nazik Avdalyan (born 1986), Armenian international weightlifter
- Nazik Cynthia Cozette (Cynthia Cozette Lee) (born 1953), American classical music composer
- Nazik Hariri, widow of former Lebanese Prime Minister Rafik Hariri
- Nazik Al-Malaika (1923–2007), Iraqi poet
- Nazik Saba Yared (born 1928), Lebanese novelist, and academic

== Places ==
- Lake Nazik, freshwater lake in the Bitlis Province, eastern part of Turkey
- Nazik, Iran (disambiguation), places in Iran
