= Moradluy-e Sofla =

Moradluy-e Sofla مرادلوي سفلي
- Village
- Location within Iran
- Coordinates: 39°19′00″N 44°58′57″E
- Country: Iran
- Province: West Azerbaijan
- County: Poldasht
- Bakhsh: Central
- Rural District: Zangebar

Population (2006)
  - Total: 283
- Time zone: UTC+3:30 (IRST)
  - Summer (DST): UTC+4:30 (IRDT)

Moradluy-e Sofla (Persian: مرادلوي سفلي, also Romanized as Morādlūy-e Soflá; also known as Morādlū-ye Soflá) is a village in Zangebar Rural District, in the Central District of Poldasht County, West Azerbaijan Province, Iran. At the 2006 census, its population was 283, in 62 families.
