= Qarajelu =

Qarajelu or Qarajalu (Persian: قراجلو), also rendered as Qarah Jalu or Qareh Jalu may refer to:

- Qarajelu, Kurdistan
- Qarajelu, Khoy, West Azerbaijan Province
- Qarah Jalu, Poldasht County, West Azerbaijan Province
- Qarajalu, Urmia, West Azerbaijan Province
- Qarajalu, Nazlu, Urmia County, West Azerbaijan Province
