= GAVE =

GAVE may refer to:

- Gave (Melgaço), a parish in Portugal
- Gave (placename element), a French word meaning torrential river in the west Pyrenees
- Gastric antral vascular ectasia (GAVE), a medical condition
- Gabinete de Avaliação Educacional (GAVE), an institution responsible for monitoring education in Portugal

== See also ==
- Give (disambiguation)
- Given (disambiguation)
- Giving (disambiguation)
- The Giver, a novel by Lois Lowry
