= Given =

A given is a statement or a condition assumed to be true or known, often to explain or give an example of something; for related topics, see:

- Presumption (in law)
- Axiom (in formal logic)
- Givenness (in discourse)
- Conditional probability, usually expressed using the term "given"

Given may also refer to:

== Places ==
- Given, Iran, or Givan, a village in West Azerbaijan, Iran
- Given, West Virginia, a settlement in the United States

== People with the surname ==
- Josiah Given (1828–1908), American judge in the Iowa Supreme Court
- Leslie E. Given, American Justice for the Supreme Court of Appeals of West Virginia
- Shay Given (born 1976), Irish footballer
- Thelma Given (1896–1977), American violinist

== Media and entertainment ==
- "Given", a song by Seether from Karma and Effect
- Given (manga), a Japanese boys' love manga series
  - Given (anime), the anime of the manga series
  - Given (2020 film), a 2020 animated film based on the series
  - Given (2024 film), the sequel to the 2020 film

== Other uses ==
- Given Imaging, an Israeli medical technology company
- Ever Given, the containership Given from the Ever group (aka Evergreen)

== See also ==
- Given name
- Givens, a surname
- Givan (disambiguation)
- Give (disambiguation)
- Gift (disambiguation)
