= Shabiluy-e Olya =

Shabiluy-e Olya or Sheybluy-e Olya (Persian: شيبلوي عليا), also rendered as Shabilu-ye Olya or Shebilu-ye Olya, may refer to:

- Shabiluy-e Olya, Miandoab
- Sheybluy-e Olya, Poldasht
