= Qaravuldaş =

- Location within Azerbaijan
- Coordinates: 38°49′17″N 48°05′13″E
- Country: Azerbaijan
- Rayon: Yardymli
- Municipality: Avaş
- Time zone: UTC+4 (AZT)
  - Summer (DST): UTC+5 (AZT)

Qaravuldaş (also, Karayldash) is a village in the Yardymli Rayon of Azerbaijan. The village forms part of the municipality of Avaş.
