= Gejlarat-e Gharbi Rural District =

Rural district in West Azerbaijan province, Iran

Gejlarat-e Gharbi Rural District Persian: دهستان گچلرات غربي
- Rural District
- Location within Iran
- Coordinates: 39°05′N 45°06′E
- Country: Iran
- Province: West Azerbaijan
- County: Poldasht
- District: Aras
- Established: 1987
- Capital: Nazok-e Olya

Population (2016)
  - Total: 4,272
- Time zone: UTC+3:30 (IRST)

Gejlarat-e Gharbi Rural District (Persian: دهستان گچلرات غربي) (Note: Formerly Gejlarat Rural District (دهستان گچلرات)) is in Aras District of Poldasht County, West Azerbaijan province, Iran. It is administered from the city of Nazok-e Olya.

== Demographics ==
=== Population ===
At the time of the 2006 National Census, the rural district's population (as a part of the former Poldasht District in Maku County) was 6,138 in 1,398 households. There were 4,020 inhabitants in 958 households at the following census of 2011, by which time the district had been separated from the county in the establishment of Poldasht County. The rural district was transferred to the new Aras District. The 2016 census measured the population of the rural district as 4,272 in 1,056 households. The most populous of its 16 villages was Chakhmaqlui-ye Sofla, with 1,687 people.

=== Other villages in the rural district ===
- Abd ol Ali Kandi
- Givan
- Karamabad
- Nazok-e Sofla
- Quch Kandi
- Quch Kandi-ye Kord
- Shir Mohammad
