= Give =

Give may refer to: making someone get or receive something from someone.

== Places ==
- Give, Denmark, a small town
  - Give Municipality, a former municipality

== Music ==
- Give (The Bad Plus album), 2004
- Give (Balkan Beat Box album), 2012
- "Give" (song), by LeAnn Rimes, 2011
- "Give", a song by Cold from Cold, 1998
- "Give", a song by Dishwalla from Pet Your Friends, 1995
- "Give", a song by You Me at Six from Night People, 2017
- "Give', a song by Sleep Token from Sundowning, 2019

== See also ==
- GAVE (disambiguation)
- Given (disambiguation)
- Giver (disambiguation)
- Giving (disambiguation)
