= Bolgarchay =

River which forms part of the Azerbaijan–Iran border

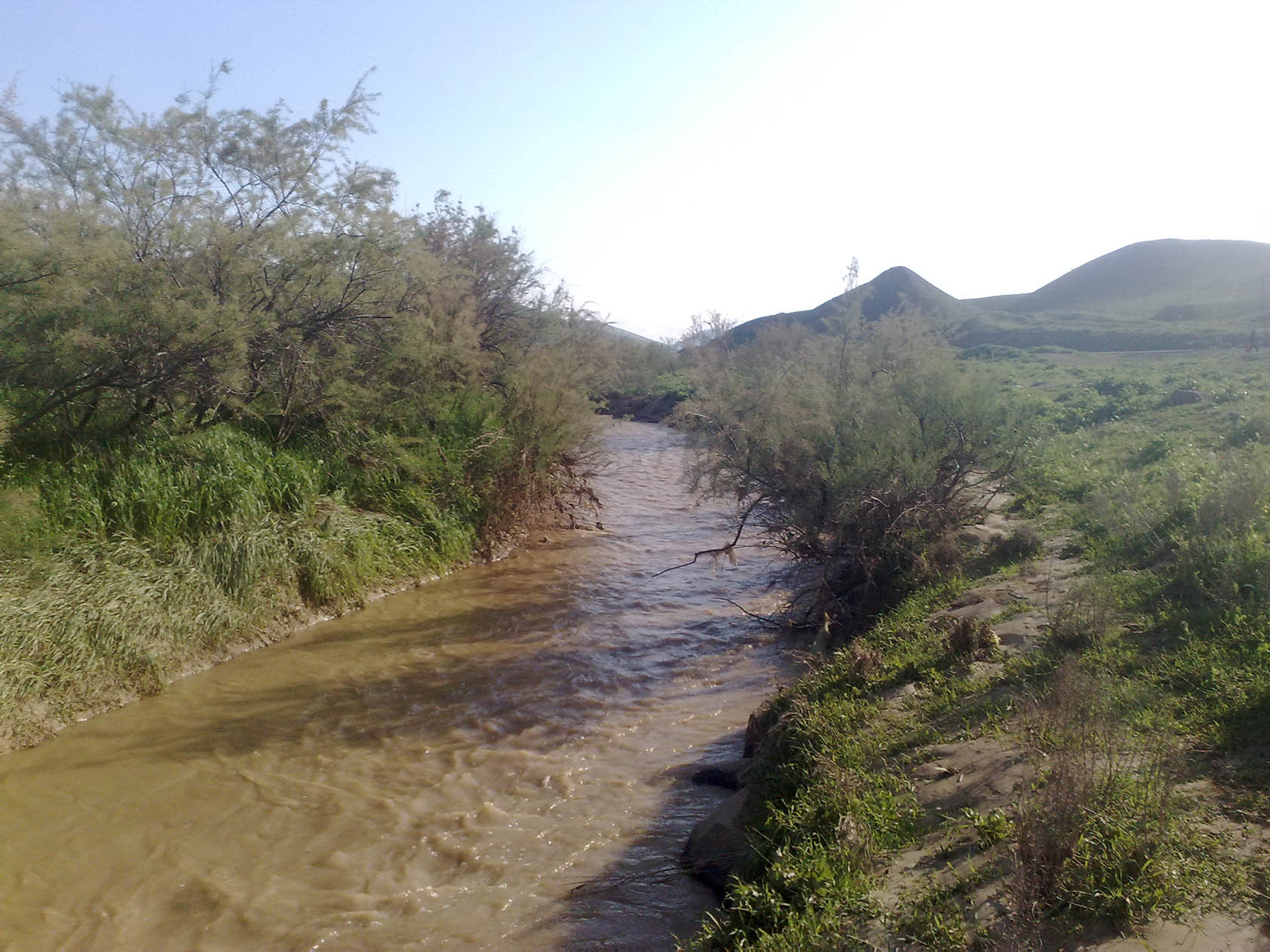
- Native name: Bolqarçay (Azerbaijani); بالهارود (Persian)

Location
- Country: Azerbaijan and Iran

Physical characteristics
- Source: Qaracadağ, Talysh Mountains
  - location: Germi County, Yardimli District
- Mouth: Mahmudchala
  - location: South-east part of Mughan plain
- Length: 163 km (101 mi)
- Basin size: 2,170 km^{2} (840 sq mi)

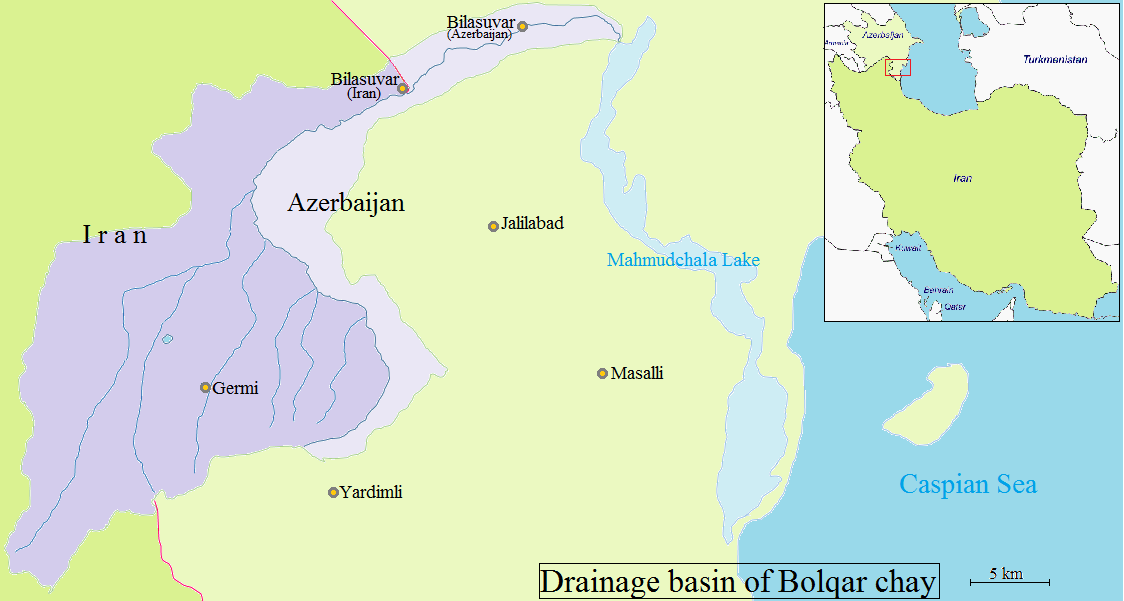
Drainage basin of Bolgarchay

The Bolgarchay (Azerbaijani: Bolqarçay, Persian: بالهارود, romanized: Bālhārūd) is a river, which forms part of the Azerbaijan–Iran border. It is 134 km (83 mi) long, and has a drainage basin of 2,170 km^{2} (840 sq mi).

== Description ==
The Bolgarchay rises from slopes of Qaracadağ, Talysh Mountains at the border of Iran and Azerbaijan. It is joined by its tributaries, all flowing from the Iranian side of its drainage basin. It flows along the Iranian-Azerbaijani border, and enters Azerbaijan at Bileh Savar. The Bolgarchay pours into Mahmudchala Lake. River's flow comes from precipitation and groundwater. In summer, river's flow decreases and sometimes dries up.

== Economy and human use ==
In 1965, a water reservoir was built on the Bolgarchay in Bilasuvar District. Reservoir has water volume of 12,000,000 m^{3} (0.0029 mi^{3}) and active storage of 11,000,000 m^{3} (0.0026 mi^{3}), with area of 2 km^{2} (0.77 mi^{2}). This reservoir enables watering 3,300 ha (13 mi^{2}) area.

== History ==
The Bolgarchay is depicted as a western border of Talysh Khanate in maps describing the Russo-Persian War (1804–1813).

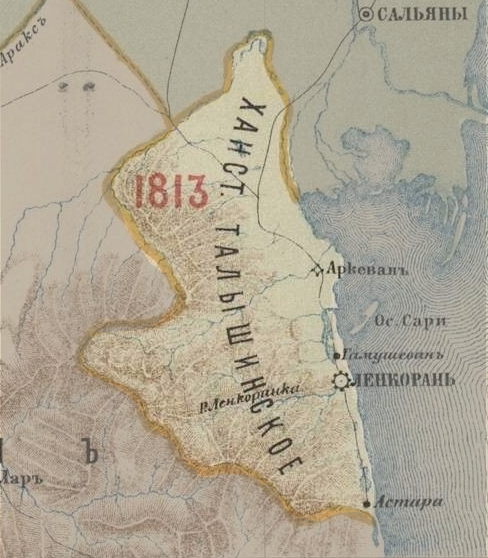
Talysh Khanate, 1813.

River was explicitly mentioned in Treaty of Turkmenchay as a part of the border between Qajar Iran and Russian Empire The Bolgarchay has since served as a northern border of Iran with Azerbaijan Democratic Republic, Azerbaijan Soviet Socialist Republic, and finally Republic of Azerbaijan. Now it marks the entire border between Jalilabad and Iran, and part of the border between Yardimli District and Iran.

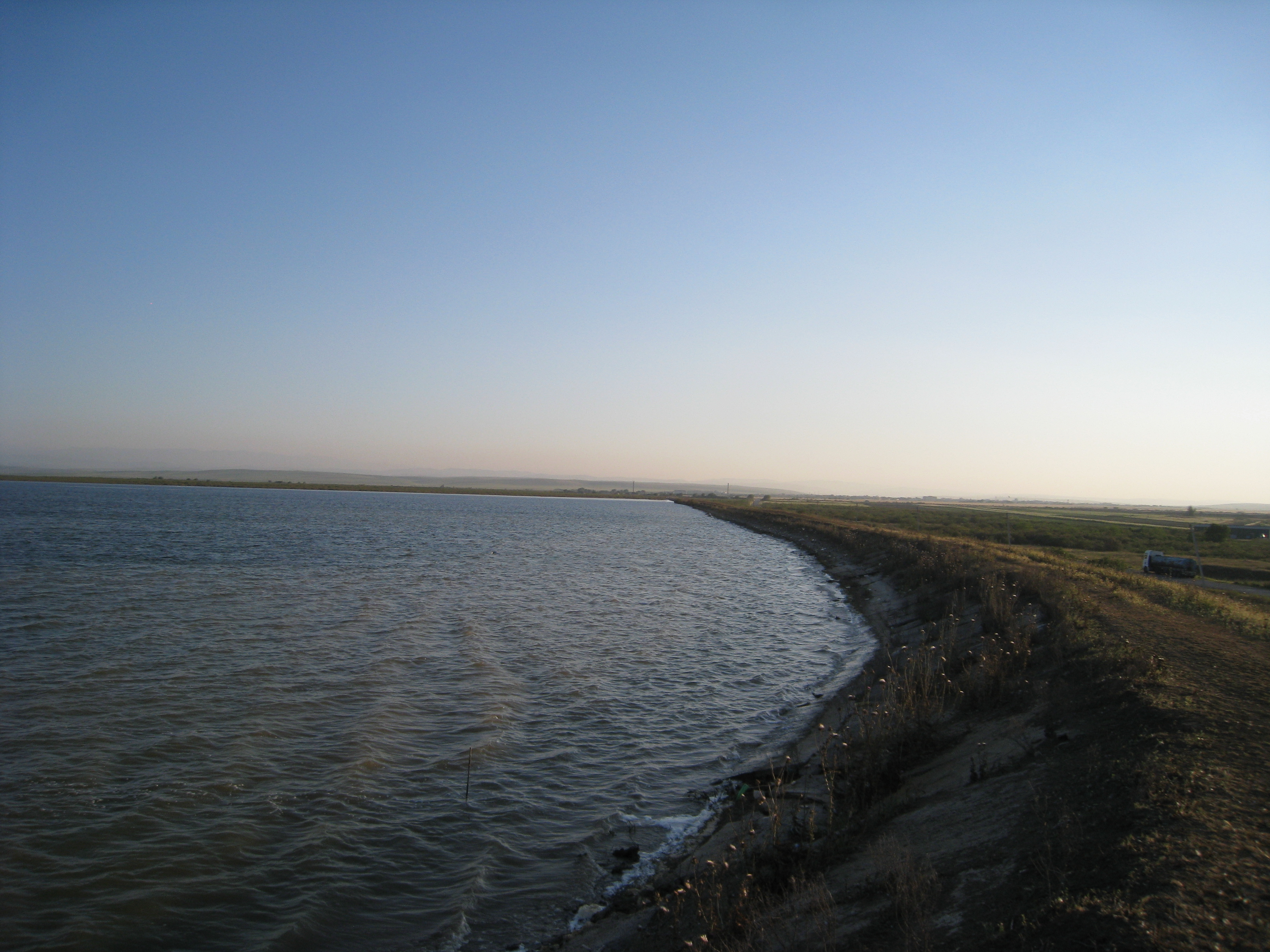
Bolgarchay Water Reservoir

== In literature ==
- Bolgarchay is mentioned by Sabir Rustamkhanli in his book, My Road of Life.

== See also ==
- Azerbaijan–Iran border
- Jalilabad District (Azerbaijan)
