= Poldasht-Shah Takhti Bridge =

Coordinates: 39.3605°N 45.0707°E

The Poldasht-Shah Takhti Bridge is a bridge located between Poldasht in the West Azerbaijan province of Iran, and Shah Takhti in the Nakhchivan Autonomous Republic of Azerbaijan. The structure spans the Aras River, and serves as a border crossing that allows access to Nakhchivan without having to pass through Armenia. Construction was finished in 2007. The bridge has a length of 538 feet (164 meters), and was built at a cost of Rls.40 billion.
