= Givan =

Givan may refer to:

== People with the surname ==
- Harry Givan (1911–1999), American businessman
- John Givan (1837–1895), Irish politician
- Juandalynn Givan, American politician
- Paul Givan (born 1981), Northern Irish politician
- Richard M. Givan (1921–2009), American jurist

== Places ==
- Nasrabad, Isfahan, a city in Iran
- Givan, West Azerbaijan, a village in Iran

== See also ==
- Senoj-Jay Givans, Jamaican sprinter
