= Shabiluy-e Sofla =

Shabiluy-e Sofla or Sheybluy-e Sofla (Persian: شيبلوي سفلي), also rendered as Shabilu-ye Sofla and Shebilu-ye Sofla, may refer to:

- Shabiluy-e Sofla, Miandoab
- Sheybluy-e Sofla, Poldasht
