= Şıxzahırlı =

- Municipality
- Location within Azerbaijan
- Coordinates: 40°28′42″N 49°01′25″E
- Country: Azerbaijan
- Rayon: Gobustan

Population
  - Total: 1,589
- Time zone: UTC+4 (AZT)
  - Summer (DST): UTC+5 (AZT)

Şıxzahırlı (also, Shikh-Zagerly, Shikh-Zagirli, Shikhzairly, and Shykhzairly) is a village and municipality in the Gobustan Rayon of Azerbaijan. It has a population of 1,589. The municipality consists of the villages of Şıxzahirli, Ceyrankeçməz, and Ilanlı.
