= Nazar Khan =

Nazar Khan (Persian: نظرخان) may refer to:

- Nazar Khan, Lorestan
- Nazar Khan, West Azerbaijan
