= Nazok-e Olya =

City in West Azerbaijan province, Iran

Nazok-e Olya Persian: نازك عليا
- City
- Location within Iran
- Coordinates: 39°00′40″N 45°03′31″E
- Country: Iran
- Province: West Azerbaijan
- County: Poldasht
- District: Aras
- Established as a city: 2011

Population (2016)
  - Total: 2,667
- Time zone: UTC+3:30 (IRST)

Nazok-e Olya (Persian: نازك عليا) (Note: Also romanized as Nāzok-e ‘Olyā; also known as Nasik, Nāzīk, Nāzīk-e ‘Olyā, Nāzok, and Nāzok-e Bālā) is a city in, and the capital of, Aras District in Poldasht County, West Azerbaijan province, Iran. It also serves as the administrative center for Gejlarat-e Gharbi Rural District. (Note: Formerly Gejlarat Rural District)

== Demographics ==
=== Population ===
At the time of the 2006 National Census, Nazok-e Olya's population was 2,466 in 613 households, when it was a village in Gejlarat-e Gharbi Rural District of the former Poldasht District in Maku County. The following census in 2011 counted 2,761 people in 789 households, by which time the district had been separated from the county in the establishment of Poldasht County. The rural district was transferred to the new Aras District. Nazok-e Olya was elevated to the status of a city in 2011. The 2016 census measured the population of the city as 2,667 people in 829 households.
