= Nasrullah Khan =

Nasrullah Khan may refer to:

- Nasrullah Khan (Bukhara) (died 1860), Emir of Bukhara, 1826–1860
- Mirza Nasrullah Khan (1840–1907), Iranian government minister
- Nasrullah Khan (Afghanistan) (1875–1920), Emir of Afghanistan
- Nawabzada Nasrullah Khan (1918–2003), Pakistani politician
- Nasrullah Khan Khattak (1928–2009), Pakistani politician
- Nasrullah Khan (squash player), Pakistani squash player and coach to Jonah Barrington
- Nasrullah Khan (footballer) (born 1985), Pakistani footballer

== See also ==
- Nasir Khan (disambiguation)
