= Giver =

Giver may refer to:

- The Giver, a 1993 novel by Lois Lowry
- The Giver (song), a 2025 song by Chappell Roan
- The Giver (film), a 2014 American social science fiction film
- "The Giver", a 2012 song by Duke Dumont from EP1
  - "The Giver (Reprise)", a 2015 remix
- "Giver", a song by K.Flay from Every Where Is Some Where, 2017
- Giver (TV series), a Canadian program airing on TVOntario's TVOKids programming
- Givers, an indie pop group from Lafayette, Louisiana

== See also ==
- Give (disambiguation)
