= Cotan =

Cotan may refer to:

- Cotangent, abbreviated as cotan, a trigonometric function

== People with the surname ==
- Alin Coțan (born 1982), Romanian footballer
- Antonio Cotán (born 1995), Spanish footballer
- Imron Cotan (born 1954), Indonesian diplomat
- Juan Sánchez Cotán (1560–1627), Spanish painter of still lives

== See also ==
- Kotan (disambiguation)
