= Ceyrankeçməz =

- Location within Azerbaijan
- Coordinates: 40°29′19″N 49°03′46″E
- Country: Azerbaijan
- Rayon: Gobustan
- Municipality: Şıxzahırlı
- Time zone: UTC+4 (AZT)
  - Summer (DST): UTC+5 (AZT)

Ceyrankeçməz (also, Dzheiran-Kechmas, Dzheyran-Kechmas, and Dzheyrankechmaz) is a village in the Gobustan Rayon of Azerbaijan. The village forms part of the municipality of Şıxzahırlı.
