= Nasir Khan =

Nasir Khan may refer to:

- Nasir Khan (Afghan cricketer), born 1998, Afghan cricketer
- Nasir Khan (Bangladeshi actor), Bangladeshi film actor
- Nasir Khan (FATA politician), Pakistani politician
- Nasir Khan (Indian actor), Indian film actor
- Nasir Khan (Pakistani cricketer), born 1975, Pakistani cricketer
- Nasir Khan (PTI politician), Pakistani politician
- Nasir Khan, Subahdar of Kabul, known for fighting Nader Shah at Khyber Pass in 1738
- Nasir Khan, fictional character and protagonist in The Night Of

== See also ==
- Nazir Khan (disambiguation)
- Nasrullah Khan (disambiguation)
