= Charles J. Givens =

American writer (1941–1998)

Charles J. Givens (February 5, 1941 – July 12, 1998) was a bestselling author of three books, Wealth Without Risk and Financial Self Defense and More Wealth Without Risk. Givens founded the Charles J. Givens Organization that grew to over 600,000 members. He frequently appeared on nationally syndicated daytime television shows to promote his "financial strategies" and hosted a weekly radio program with self named "Christian Financial Planner" James L. Paris. At his peak Givens extravagant lifestyle was profiled on the popular television program Lifestyles of the Rich and Famous. His organization collapsed after a number of lawsuits, and regulatory investigations of investments sold by Paris, central Florida radio personality Jack Dicks, and former vacuum cleaner salesman Charles C Smith Jr.

== Personal history ==
Givens was born and raised in Decatur, Illinois. His father, a construction company owner, deserted the family and left them poor. This situation made things tough around the house, and it affected the Givens mentally. In a 1989 interview, Givens said he once considered himself a "loser", and at 16 wrote a suicide note. He bought the rights to call as "his" song the famous single, "Hang On Sloopy". This may have been related to the difficulty in proving statements in his autobiography.

Givens slowly built a multimillion-dollar empire in the late 1980s, publishing such ghost-written books as the best-selling Wealth Without Risk and Financial Self-Defense. He became a best selling author, with two books in the Bestsellers list during the 1990s. Also during his financial peak, he owned the Charles J. Givens Organization, which counted at more than 600,000 members. The company provided financial education, and brought in $104 million of revenue.

He died from prostate cancer on July 12, 1998.

== Fraud claims ==
Over his career Givens was the target of dozens of lawsuits and two court cases for defrauding customers, one in California and one in Florida. The California fraud case found that he had misled his customers by claiming that he had made his money using his financial strategies, rather than by selling his financial strategies, and he was ordered to refund $14.1 million to his customers. Givens settled the Florida fraud case. Givens was also sued for advocating dropping insurance to save money by a woman whose husband was killed by an uninsured driver. Givens settled the insurance suit in 1993.

== Books published ==
- Wealth Without Risk, 1988, Simon and Schuster, NY
- Financial Self Defense, 1990, Simon and Schuster, NY
- Wealth Without Risk for Canadians, 1992, Stoddart, Canada (ghosted)
- Superself — Doubling Your Personal Effectiveness, 1993, Simon and Schuster, NY
- More Wealth Without Risk, 1995, Simon and Schuster, NY
