= Aziz Kand =

Aziz Kand عزيزكند
- Village
- Location within Iran
- Coordinates: 36°34′25″N 46°00′49″E
- Country: Iran
- Province: West Azerbaijan
- County: Bukan
- Bakhsh: Central
- Rural District: Akhtachi

Population (2006)
  - Total: 244
- Time zone: UTC+3:30 (IRST)
  - Summer (DST): UTC+4:30 (IRDT)

Aziz Kand (Persian: عزيزكند, also Romanized as ‘Azīz Kand; also known as ‘Azīz Kandī) is a village in Akhtachi Rural District, in the Central District of Bukan County, West Azerbaijan Province, Iran. At the 2006 census, its population was 244, in 49 families.
