= Shur Bolagh, Chaldoran =

Shur Bolagh شوربلاغ
- Village
- Location within Iran
- Coordinates: 39°04′29″N 44°36′33″E
- Country: Iran
- Province: West Azerbaijan
- County: Chaldoran
- Bakhsh: Central
- Rural District: Baba Jik

Population (2006)
  - Total: 79
- Time zone: UTC+3:30 (IRST)
  - Summer (DST): UTC+4:30 (IRDT)

Shur Bolagh (Persian: شوربلاغ, also Romanized as Shūr Bolāgh and Shūrbolāgh) is a village in Baba Jik Rural District, in the Central District of Chaldoran County, West Azerbaijan Province, Iran. At the 2006 census, its population was 79, in 14 families.
