= Avaş =

- Municipality
- Location within Azerbaijan
- Coordinates: 38°54′11″N 48°05′56″E
- Country: Azerbaijan
- Rayon: Yardymli

Population
  - Total: 1,047
- Time zone: UTC+4 (AZT)
  - Summer (DST): UTC+5 (AZT)

Avaş is a village and municipality in the Yardymli Rayon of Azerbaijan. It has a population of 962. The municipality consists of the villages of Avaş, Qaravuldaş, and Deman.
