= Qurshaqlu, East Azerbaijan =

Qurshaqlu قورشاقلو
- Village
- Location within Iran
- Coordinates: 38°31′26″N 47°12′18″E
- Country: Iran
- Province: East Azerbaijan
- County: Ahar
- Bakhsh: Central
- Rural District: Owch Hacha

Population (2006)
  - Total: 49
- Time zone: UTC+3:30 (IRST)
  - Summer (DST): UTC+4:30 (IRDT)

Qurshaqlu (Persian: قورشاقلو, also Romanized as Qūrshāqlū) is a village in Owch Hacha Rural District, in the Central District of Ahar County, East Azerbaijan Province, Iran. At the 2006 census, its population consisted of 11 families with a total village population of 49 people.
