= Nazir Ahmed Khan (politician) =

Pakistani politician (1923–2021)

Chaudhry Nazir Ahmed Khan
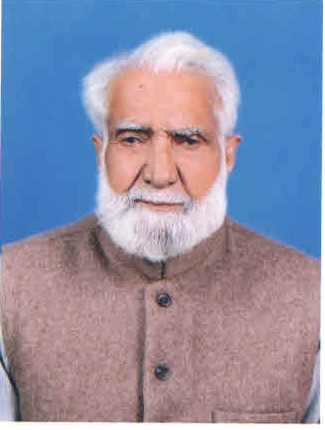

Member of the National Assembly of Pakistan
- In office 1990–1993
- Constituency: NA-87 Sialkot-III

Personal details
- Born: October 1923 Tehsil Batala, Gurdaspur District, British India
- Died: 9 August 2021 (aged 97) Sialkot, Punjab, Pakistan
- Party: Jamaat-e-Islami Pakistan
- Other political affiliations: All India Muslim League
- Education: Bachelor of Education, Diploma in Civil Engineering, Master's degree in Political Science
- Occupation: Politician

Chaudhry Nazir Ahmed Khan (Urdu: چوہدری نذیراحمد خاں) (October 1923 – 9 August 2021) was a Pakistani politician. He was a member of the All India Muslim League, who served as a Member of the National Assembly of Pakistan (1990–1993). During the pre- and post-partition of the subcontinent, Nazir Ahmed Khan played a significant role in political parties such as the All India Muslim League (Pre-Partition) and Jamaat-e-Islami Pakistan.

== Early life ==
Nazir Ahmed Khan was born in 1923 to a Muslim Rajput family in the Tehsil Batala of District Gurdaspur. His great-grandfather accepted Islam and changed his name from Kesar Singh to Kesar Khan. Kesar Khan was the direct descendant of famous Rajput warriors, Jaimal and Fatta, known for their legends. One legend was their resistance to Mughal Emperor Akbar, when Akbar's army besieged the fort of Chittor. After the Partition of India, Nazir Ahmed Khan's family migrated to Sialkot Pakistan. He later permanently settled in Bhopalwala, a small town of Sialkot district.

Nazir Ahmed Khan held a Bachelor of Education, a Diploma in Civil Engineering and later completed his master's degree in Political Science. In 1940, when All India Muslim League adopted Lahore Resolution (Urdu: قراردادِ لاہور), popularized as Pakistan Resolution or Resolution of Pakistan, Khan was a student in M.A.O. College of Amritsar, where poet Faiz Ahmed Faiz was his professor of English. During the years 1944 - 1948, Khan worked as a subengineer in the Public Works Department. From 1949 - 1962, he served as School Teacher and then College Lecturer in Tehsil Daska of Sialkot District.

== Career ==
In the general elections of 1990, Khan was elected as Member of National Assembly of Pakistan (MNA) from NA-87 Sialkot-III, which is divided into two constituencies NA-111 Sialkot and NA-112 Sialkot. He stood for Jamaat-e Islami-Pakistan at that time, but after being elected, he requested his party Jamaat-e-Islami detach him from party responsibilities. His three-year term ran from 1990-1993. As a member of National Assembly and Ruling Alliance, Khan represented Pakistan in Iran and 6th OIC Summit Conference in Dakar, Senegal (9–11 December 1991). He was one of the least controversial and honest members of Pakistan National Assembly. During his tenure, he strived to eradicate corruption from Government Departments, especially Police. When Ghulam Ishaq Khan dissolved the National Assembly in 1993, city police of Daska launched a celebratory gunfire to hail the decision. Upon asking the reason of aerial firing by the Assistant Commissioner of Daska, policemen replied "Thank God we finally got rid of the old man" (Punjabi: شکر اے بابے توں جان چھوٹی). It was like a sigh of relief for the Daska Police that the strict surveillance of Nazir Ahmed Khan had come to its end.

== Independence movement ==
Before partition Khan was a member of All India Muslim League Batala, and of Central Advisory Committee of Batala. When Muhammad Ali Jinnah was travelling to Lahore with his team for the three-day general session, the occasion later marked as Lahore Resolution or Pakistan Resolution, Khan was one of the students who greeted him at Amritsar Railway Station. In 1946, when All India Muslim League started rallies against the Government of Khizar Hayat Tiwana (Prime Minister of Punjab Province), Khan actively participated in these rallies. Each day during the rallies, a group of Muslim League's youth surrendered to the authorities. The decision of volunteer arrest was made by Muslim League and Syed Bahauddin Ahmed Gillani (President of City Muslim League). In the final rally, Khan led the group of youth who surrendered to the authorities. He continued his struggle with Muslim League until the creation of Pakistan.

== Jamaat-e-Islami-Pakistan ==
Khan became a member of Jamaat-e-Islami in 1952 and served his party in multiple positions. He remained a member of Central Advisory Committee of Jamaat-e-Islami for 42 years (1958-2000). He was Ameer (President) of Jamaat-e-Islami District Sialkot, Ameer of Jamaat-e-Islami Division Gujranwala and Naib Ameer (Vice President) of Jamaat-e-Islami Punjab Province. With other prominent leaders, he faced politically motivated imprisonment for almost one year, where he wrote his book Wardaat-e-Zindan (Urdu: وارداتِ زِنداں).

== Death ==
Khan died after suffering a heart attack on 9 August 2021, at the age of 97.
