= Clay cutan =

Clay Cutans are a geologic fabric that develop around ancient cavities (such as peds) within paleosols.

== Formation ==
Clay Cutans form by the coating of ancient open spaces by colloidal materials that were eluviated down from overlying horizons - and are commonly stained by iron oxides such as hematite. While the originally openings are commonly lost through geologic time and diagenesis, the cutanic fabric remains as evidence. Cutans also often contain relics of nodules and skeleton grains.

They are one of the most diagnostic features of paleosols.

== Recognition ==
Clay Cutans are most easily recognized under cross polarized light where they anisotropic. Cutans usually show lineations caused by the preferred orientation of clay minerals.

== Practical Significance ==
Clay Cutans inherently indicate illuviation and therefore may indicate the presence of a petroleum seal in an underlying layer if silica had been transported to that depth. The J2 sandstone in Medicine River Gas Field in Alberta, Canada was cemented in such a manner.
