= Aziz Kandi, East Azerbaijan =

Aziz Kandi عزيزكندي
- Village
- Location within Iran
- Coordinates: 37°26′59″N 46°57′49″E
- Country: Iran
- Province: East Azerbaijan
- County: Hashtrud
- Bakhsh: Central
- Rural District: Qaranqu

Population (2006)
  - Total: 314
- Time zone: UTC+3:30 (IRST)
  - Summer (DST): UTC+4:30 (IRDT)

Aziz Kandi (Persian: عزيزكندي, also Romanized as ‘Azīz Kandī) is a village in Qaranqu Rural District, in the Central District of Hashtrud County, East Azerbaijan Province, Iran. At the 2006 census, its population was 314, in 67 families.
