= Kutang =

Kutang may refer to:

- Manaslu, also known as Kutang, a mountain in the Himalayas
- Kutang language, a Tibeto-Burman language of Nepal

== See also ==
- Qutang Gorge, in China
