= Qurshalu =

Qurshalu قورشالو
- Village
- Location within Iran
- Coordinates: 37°30′02″N 45°09′03″E
- Country: Iran
- Province: West Azerbaijan
- County: Urmia
- Bakhsh: Central
- Rural District: Baranduzchay-ye Shomali

Population (2006)
  - Total: 212
- Time zone: UTC+3:30 (IRST)
  - Summer (DST): UTC+4:30 (IRDT)

Qurshalu (Persian: قورشالو, also Romanized as Qūrshālū; also known as Qūrshāqlū) is a village in Baranduzchay-ye Shomali Rural District, in the Central District of Urmia County, West Azerbaijan Province, Iran. At the 2006 census, its population was 212, in 59 families.
