= Ilanlı =

- Location within Azerbaijan
- Coordinates: 40°28′21″N 49°01′20″E
- Country: Azerbaijan
- Rayon: Gobustan
- Municipality: Şıxzahırlı
- Time zone: UTC+4 (AZT)
  - Summer (DST): UTC+5 (AZT)

Ilanlı (also, İlanlı, Ilanlu, and Ilanly) is a village in the Gobustan Rayon of Azerbaijan. The village forms part of the municipality of Şıxzahırlı.
