= Shur Bolagh, Ravansar =

Shur Bolagh شوربلاغ
- Village
- Location within Iran
- Coordinates: 34°33′49″N 46°44′59″E
- Country: Iran
- Province: Kermanshah
- County: Ravansar
- Bakhsh: Central
- Rural District: Hasanabad

Population (2006)
  - Total: 178
- Time zone: UTC+3:30 (IRST)
  - Summer (DST): UTC+4:30 (IRDT)

Shur Bolagh (Persian: شوربلاغ, also Romanized as Shūr Bolāgh) is a village in Hasanabad Rural District, in the Central District of Ravansar County, Kermanshah Province, Iran. At the 2006 census, its population was 178, in 40 families.
