= Shur Bolagh, Sahneh =

Shur Bolagh شوربلاغ
- Village
- Location within Iran
- Coordinates: 34°39′08″N 47°24′04″E
- Country: Iran
- Province: Kermanshah
- County: Sahneh
- Bakhsh: Dinavar
- Rural District: Horr

Population (2006)
  - Total: 94
- Time zone: UTC+3:30 (IRST)
  - Summer (DST): UTC+4:30 (IRDT)

Shur Bolagh (Persian: شوربلاغ, also Romanized as Shūr Bolāgh; also known as Shūr Bolāch and Shūr Bulāq) is a village in Horr Rural District, Dinavar District, Sahneh County, Kermanshah Province, Iran. At the 2006 census, its population was 94, in 23 families.
