= Ali Nazer, Khuzestan =

Ali Nazer علي نظر
- Village
- Country: Iran
- Province: Khuzestan
- County: Andika
- Bakhsh: Central
- Rural District: Qaleh-ye Khvajeh

Population (2006)
  - Total: 261
- Time zone: UTC+3:30 (IRST)
  - Summer (DST): UTC+4:30 (IRDT)

Ali Nazer (Persian: علي نظر, also Romanized as ʿAlī Naẓer) is a village in Qaleh-ye Khvajeh Rural District, in the Central District of Andika County, Khuzestan Province, Iran. At the 2006 census, its population was 261, in 43 families.
