= Poldasht =

City in West Azerbaijan province, Iran

Poldasht پلدشت Kurdish: پارێزدەشت
- City
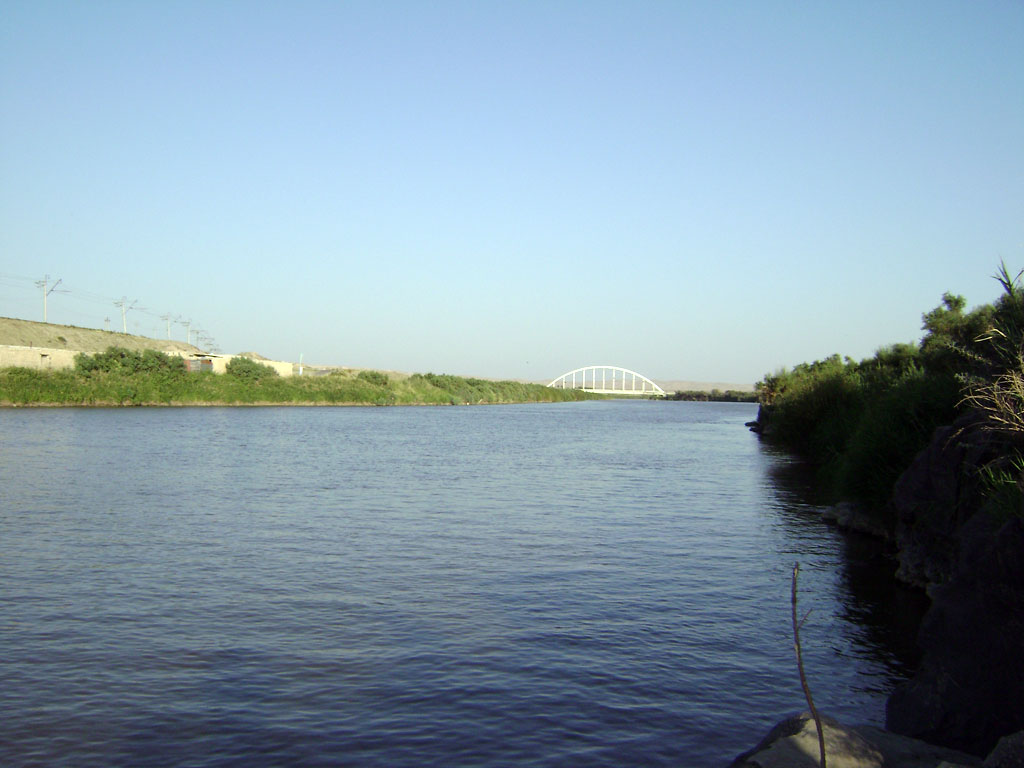
- Aras River in the Poldasht border region

- Location within Iran
- Coordinates: 39°20′41″N 45°04′05″E
- Country: Iran
- Province: West Azerbaijan
- County: Poldasht
- District: Central

Population (2016)
  - Total: 11,472
- Time zone: UTC+3:30 (IRST)

Poldasht (Persian: پلدشت) (Note: Also romanized as Pol Dasht, Pol’desht, and Pol-e Dasht; also known as Araplar and Pul Dasht; and Azerbaijani: پولدشت) is a city in the Central District of Poldasht County in Iran's West Azerbaijan province, serving as capital of both the county and the district. The city lies on the western bank of the Aras River.

Poldasht is a Persian word meaning arable land by the bridge. The city is situated near the border crossing with the Nakhchivan Autonomous Republic of Azerbaijan. Across the Poldasht-Shah Takhti Bridge over the Aras is the Azerbaijani village of Şahtaxtı. It is one of the two Iran-Nakhchivan border crossings; the other is located near the city of Jolfa in East Azerbaijan province. Also adjacent to Poldasht is the Aras River Dam.

== Demographics ==
=== Population ===
At the time of the 2006 National Census, the city's population was 8,584 people in 2,205 households, when it was capital of the former Poldasht District of Maku County. The following census in 2011 counted 9,963 people in 2,658 households, by which time the district had been separated from the county in the establishment of Poldasht County. Poldasht was transferred to the new Central District as the county's capital. The 2016 census measured the population of the city as 11,472 people in 3,377 households.

== Climate ==
Poldasht has a weather station at an elevation of 830 m (2,720 ft), operating since 2001. The following data are based on observations from 2001-2016.

The climate in Poldasht is characterized by cold freezing winters with low precipitation. Subzero temperatures are common from November to April. Daily maximum temperatures may also fall below freezing in winter. The weather in summer is hot during the day and mild to warm at night with mean minimum temperature between 16.0 °C (60.8 °F) and 19.0 °C (66.2 °F). Precipitation is highest in spring and is lowest in mid-summer.
