= Qotan =

Qotan قطان
- Village
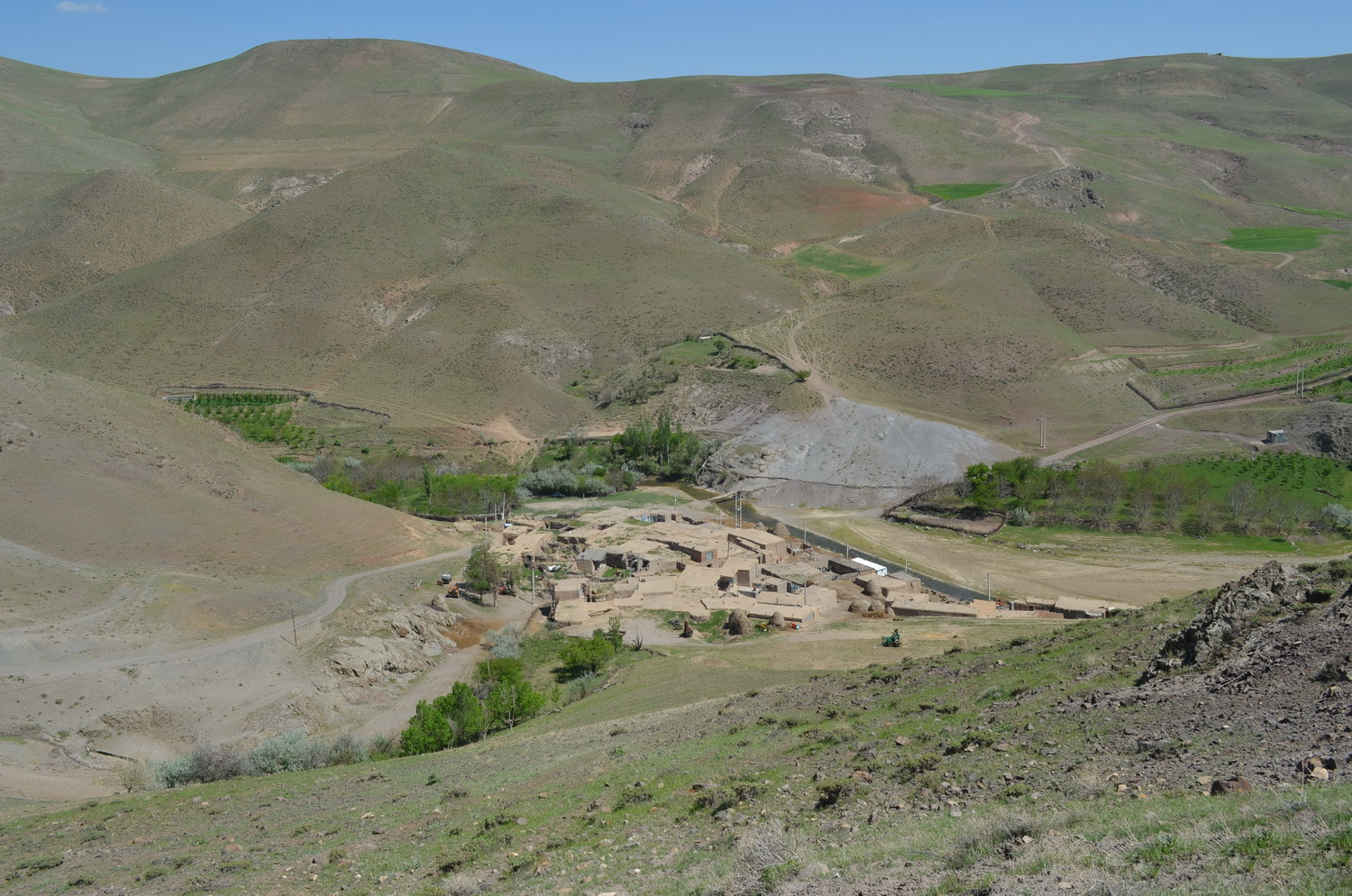

- Location within Iran
- Coordinates: 37°11′24″N 46°26′19″E
- Country: Iran
- Province: East Azerbaijan
- County: Maragheh
- Bakhsh: Saraju
- Rural District: Sarajuy-ye Jonubi

Population (2006)
  - Total: 53
- Time zone: UTC+3:30 (IRST)
  - Summer (DST): UTC+4:30 (IRDT)

Qotan (Persian: قطان, also Romanized as Qoţān) is a village in Sarajuy-ye Jonubi Rural District, Saraju District, Maragheh County, East Azerbaijan Province, Iran. At the 2006 census, its population was 53, in 15 families.
