= Deman =

- Location within Azerbaijan
- Coordinates: 38°52′40″N 48°02′27″E
- Country: Azerbaijan
- Rayon: Yardymli
- Municipality: Avaş
- Time zone: UTC+4 (AZT)
  - Summer (DST): UTC+5 (AZT)

Deman (also, Diman and Dyman) — is a village in the Yardymli Rayon of Azerbaijan. The village forms part of the municipality of Avaş.

== Notable natives ==
- Georgi Limanski — mayor of Samara (1997–2006).
