= Chaybasar-e Sharqi Rural District =

Rural district in West Azerbaijan province, Iran

Chaybasar-e Sharqi Rural District Persian: دهستان چايپاسار شرقي
- Rural District
- Location within Iran
- Coordinates: 39°26′36″N 44°52′42″E
- Country: Iran
- Province: West Azerbaijan
- County: Poldasht
- District: Central
- Established: 1987
- Capital: Eshqabad

Population (2016)
  - Total: 6,331
- Time zone: UTC+3:30 (IRST)

Chaybasar-e Sharqi Rural District (Persian: دهستان چايپاسار شرقي) is in the Central District of Poldasht County, West Azerbaijan province, Iran. Its capital is the village of Eshqabad. The previous capital of the rural district was the village of Yowla Galdi, now a city in the Central District of Showt County.

== Demographics ==
=== Population ===
At the time of the 2006 National Census, the rural district's population (as a part of the former Poldasht District in Maku County) was 6,132 in 1,214 households. There were 6,963 inhabitants in 1,604 households at the following census of 2011, by which time the district had been separated from the county in the establishment of Poldasht County. The rural district was transferred to the new Central District. The 2016 census measured the population of the rural district as 6,331 in 1,500 households. The most populous of its 16 villages was Shidi, with 881 people.

=== Other villages in the rural district ===
- Bahlul Kandi
- Ganeh Luy
- Pazi
- Shurbolagh-e Olya
- Shurbolagh-e Sofla
- Shutlu
- Zakerlu
