= Gejlarat-e Sharqi Rural District =

Rural district in West Azerbaijan province, Iran

Gejlarat-e Sharqi Rural District Persian: دهستان گچلرات شرقي
- Rural District
- Location within Iran
- Coordinates: 39°03′N 45°18′E
- Country: Iran
- Province: West Azerbaijan
- County: Poldasht
- District: Aras
- Established: 1991
- Capital: Beyk Jan

Population (2016)
  - Total: 6,854
- Time zone: UTC+3:30 (IRST)

Gejlarat-e Sharqi Rural District (Persian: دهستان گچلرات شرقي) is in Aras District of Poldasht County, West Azerbaijan province, Iran. Its capital is the village of Beyk Jan.

== Demographics ==
=== Population ===
At the time of the 2006 National Census, the rural district's population (as a part of the former Poldasht District in Maku County) was 6,578 in 1,445 households. There were 7,268 inhabitants in 1,857 households at the following census of 2011, by which time the district had been separated from the county in the establishment of Poldasht County. The rural district was transferred to the new Aras District. The 2016 census measured the population of the rural district as 6,854 in 1,911 households. The most populous of its 27 villages was Shahrak-e Aras, (Note: Formerly known as Shahrak-e Sadaras) with 1,888 people.

=== Other villages in the rural district ===
- Divankhaneh
- Hasan Kandi
- Ilanlu
- Karbalay Baqer
- Nosratabad
- Sayyet Askan Ashayir Milad
- Sheybluy-e Olya
- Sheybluy-e Sofla
- Torahmish
