= Zangebar Rural District =

Rural district in West Azerbaijan province, Iran

Zangebar Rural District Persian: دهستان زنگبار
- Rural District
- Location within Iran
- Coordinates: 39°17′N 45°03′E
- Country: Iran
- Province: West Azerbaijan
- County: Poldasht
- District: Central
- Established: 1987
- Capital: Bohlulabad

Population (2016)
  - Total: 10,574
- Time zone: UTC+3:30 (IRST)

Zangebar Rural District (Persian: دهستان زنگبار) is in the Central District of Poldasht County, West Azerbaijan province, Iran. Its capital is the village of Bohlulabad.

== Demographics ==
=== Population ===
At the time of the 2006 National Census, the rural district's population (as a part of the former Poldasht District in Maku County) was 11,154 in 2,496 households. There were 11,096 inhabitants in 2,814 households at the following census of 2011, by which time the district had been separated from the county in the establishment of Poldasht County. The rural district was transferred to the new Central District. The 2016 census measured the population of the rural district as 10,574 in 2,864 households. The most populous of its 43 villages was Bohlulabad, with 1,326 people.

=== Other villages in the rural district ===
- Ali Nazar
- Daylan Kandi
- Mashhadi Mirza Kandi
- Oruj-e Mohammad
- Pileh Savar
- Purnak
- Qalanj Lanmesh
- Qarah Jalu
