= Aras District =

District in West Azerbaijan province, Iran

Aras District Persian: بخش ارس
- District
- Location within Iran
- Coordinates: 39°03′N 45°14′E
- Country: Iran
- Province: West Azerbaijan
- County: Poldasht
- Established: 2007
- Capital: Nazok-e Olya

Population (2016)
  - Total: 13,793
- Time zone: UTC+3:30 (IRST)

Aras District (Persian: بخش ارس) is in Poldasht County, West Azerbaijan province, Iran. Its capital is the city of Nazok-e Olya.

== History ==
In 2007, Poldasht District was separated from Maku County in the establishment of Poldasht County, which was divided into two districts of two rural districts each, with the city of Poldasht as its capital.

== Demographics ==
=== Population ===
At the time of the 2011 census, the district's population was 14,049 people in 3,604 households. The 2016 census measured the population of the district as 13,793 inhabitants in 3,796 households.

=== Administrative divisions ===
Aras District Population
Administrative Divisions	2011	2016
Gejlarat-e Gharbi RD (Note: Formerly Gejlarat Rural District)	4,020	4,272
Gejlarat-e Sharqi RD	7,268	6,854
Nazok-e Olya (city)	2,761	2,667
Total	14,049	13,793
RD = Rural District
