= Central District (Poldasht County) =

District in West Azerbaijan province, Iran

Central District (Poldasht County) Persian: بخش مرکزی شهرستان پلدشت
- District
- Location within Iran
- Coordinates: 39°22′N 44°59′E
- Country: Iran
- Province: West Azerbaijan
- County: Poldasht
- Established: 2007
- Capital: Poldasht

Population (2016)
  - Total: 28,377
- Time zone: UTC+3:30 (IRST)

The Central District of Poldasht County (Persian: بخش مرکزی شهرستان پلدشت) is in West Azerbaijan province, Iran. Its capital is the city of Poldasht.

== History ==
In 2007, Poldasht District was separated from Maku County in the establishment of Poldasht County, which was divided into two districts of two rural districts each, with Poldasht as its capital.

== Demographics ==
=== Population ===
At the time of the 2011 census, the district's population was 28,022 people in 7,706 households. The 2016 census measured the population of the district as 28,377 inhabitants in 7,741 households.

=== Administrative divisions ===
Central District (Poldasht County) Population
Administrative Divisions	2011	2016
Chaybasar-e Sharqi RD	6,963	6,331
Zangebar RD	11,096	10,574
Poldasht (city)	9,963	11,472
Total	28,022	28,377
RD = Rural District
