= Poldasht District =

Former district in West Azerbaijan province, Iran

Poldasht District Persian: بخش پلدشت
- Former District
- Location within Iran
- Coordinates: 39°12′N 45°10′E
- Country: Iran
- Province: West Azerbaijan
- County: Maku
- Capital: Poldasht

Population (2006)
  - Total: 38,586
- Time zone: UTC+3:30 (IRST)

Poldasht District (Persian: بخش پلدشت) is a former administrative district of Maku County, West Azerbaijan province, Iran. Its capital was the city of Poldasht.

== History ==
In 2007, the district was separated from the county in the establishment of Poldasht County.

== Demographics ==
=== Population ===
At the time of the 2006 census, the district's population was 38,586 in 8,758 households.

=== Administrative divisions ===
Poldasht District Population
Administrative Divisions	2006
Chaybasar-e Sharqi RD	6,132
Gejlarat-e Gharbi RD	6,138
Gejlarat-e Sharqi RD	6,578
Zangebar RD	11,154
Poldasht (city)	8,584
Total	38,586
RD = Rural District
