= Poldasht County =

County in West Azerbaijan province, Iran

Poldasht County Persian: شهرستان پلدشت
- County
- Location of Poldasht County in West Azerbaijan province (top, pink)

- Location of West Azerbaijan province in Iran
- Coordinates: 39°12′N 45°04′E
- Country: Iran
- Province: West Azerbaijan
- Established: 2007
- Capital: Poldasht
- Districts: Central, Aras

Population (2016)
  - Total: 42,170
- Time zone: UTC+3:30 (IRST)

Poldasht County (Persian: شهرستان پلدشت) is in West Azerbaijan province, Iran. Its capital is the city of Poldasht.

== History ==
In 2007, Poldasht District was separated from Maku County in the establishment of Poldasht County, which was divided into two districts of two rural districts each, with Poldasht as its capital.

== Demographics ==
=== Population ===
At the time of the 2011 census, the county's population was 42,071 people in the newly formed Poldasht County, in 10,654 households. The 2016 census measured the population of the county as 42,170 in 11,537 households.

=== Administrative divisions ===
Poldasht County's population history and administrative structure over two consecutive censuses are shown in the following table.

Poldasht County Population
Administrative Divisions	2011	2016
Central District	28,022	28,377
Chaybasar-e Sharqi RD	6,963	6,331
Zangebar RD	11,096	10,574
Poldasht (city)	9,963	11,472
Aras District	14,049	13,793
Gejlarat-e Gharbi RD (Note: Formerly Gejlarat Rural District)	4,020	4,272
Gejlarat-e Sharqi RD	7,268	6,854
Nazok-e Olya (city)	2,761	2,667
Total	42,071	42,170
RD = Rural District

== Tourism ==
The historical Saint Stepanos Monastery, in the village of Dar-e Sham, in the Gejlarat area of Poldasht, draws tourists and the faithful from Iran and around the world. It was built in the Armenian style during the Safavid era.

== See also ==
Media related to Poldasht County at Wikimedia Commons
