= 2023 UEFA Nations League Finals squads =

Team squads of 2023 Nations League Finals

The 2023 UEFA Nations League Finals was an international football tournament held in the Netherlands from 14 to 18 June 2023. The four national teams involved in the tournament were required to register a squad of up to 23 players – of which three had to be goalkeepers – by 4 June 2023, ten days prior to the opening match of the tournament. Only players in these squads were eligible to take part in the tournament. In the event that a player on the submitted squad list suffered from an injury or illness prior to his team's first match of the tournament, that player could be replaced, provided that the team doctor and a doctor from the UEFA Medical Committee both confirmed that the injury or illness was severe enough to prevent the player from participating in the tournament. Should a goalkeeper have suffered from an injury or illness after his team's first match of the tournament, he could still be replaced prior to the second match, even if the other goalkeepers from the squad were still available.

The position listed for each player is per the official squad lists published by UEFA. The age listed for each player is as of 14 June 2023, the first day of the tournament. The numbers of caps and goals listed for each player do not include any matches played after the start of the tournament. The club listed is the club for which the player last played a competitive match prior to the tournament. The nationality for each club reflects the national association (not the league) to which the club is affiliated.

== Croatia ==
Manager: Zlatko Dalić

Croatia announced a 24-man squad on 22 May 2023. The final 23-man squad was announced on 5 June 2023. A day later, Marko Livaja withdrew from the squad. On 10 June, Joško Gvardiol withdrew from the squad due to injury, and was replaced by Dion Drena Beljo.

No.	Pos.	Player	Date of birth (age)	Caps	Goals	Club
1	GK	Dominik Livaković	9 January 1995 (aged 28)	43	0	(Croatian Football Federation) Dinamo Zagreb
2	DF	Josip Stanišić	2 April 2000 (aged 23)	9	0	(German Football Association) Bayern Munich
3	DF	Borna Barišić	10 November 1992 (aged 30)	30	1	(Scottish Football Association) Rangers
5	DF	Martin Erlić	24 January 1998 (aged 25)	4	0	(Italian Football Federation) Sassuolo
6	DF	Josip Šutalo	28 February 2000 (aged 23)	6	0	(Croatian Football Federation) Dinamo Zagreb
7	MF	Lovro Majer	17 January 1998 (aged 25)	20	4	(French Football Federation) Rennes
8	MF	Mateo Kovačić	6 May 1994 (aged 29)	93	5	(The Football Association) Chelsea
9	FW	Andrej Kramarić	19 June 1991 (aged 31)	83	23	(German Football Association) TSG Hoffenheim
10	MF	Luka Modrić (captain)	9 September 1985 (aged 37)	164	23	(Royal Spanish Football Federation) Real Madrid
11	MF	Marcelo Brozović	16 November 1992 (aged 30)	85	7	(Italian Football Federation) Internazionale
12	GK	Nediljko Labrović	10 October 1999 (aged 23)	0	0	(Croatian Football Federation) Rijeka
13	MF	Nikola Vlašić	4 October 1997 (aged 25)	49	7	(Italian Football Federation) Torino
14	FW	Ivan Perišić	2 February 1989 (aged 34)	125	33	(The Football Association) Tottenham Hotspur
15	MF	Mario Pašalić	9 February 1995 (aged 28)	52	7	(Italian Football Federation) Atalanta
16	MF	Luka Ivanušec	26 November 1998 (aged 24)	12	1	(Croatian Football Federation) Dinamo Zagreb
17	FW	Bruno Petković	16 September 1994 (aged 28)	29	7	(Croatian Football Federation) Dinamo Zagreb
18	FW	Petar Musa	4 March 1998 (aged 25)	2	0	(Portuguese Football Federation) Benfica
19	DF	Borna Sosa	21 January 1998 (aged 25)	14	1	(German Football Association) VfB Stuttgart
20	FW	Dion Drena Beljo	1 March 2002 (aged 21)	0	0	(German Football Association) FC Augsburg
21	DF	Domagoj Vida	29 April 1989 (aged 34)	100	4	(Hellenic Football Federation) AEK Athens
22	DF	Josip Juranović	16 August 1995 (aged 27)	29	0	(German Football Association) Union Berlin
23	GK	Ivica Ivušić	1 February 1995 (aged 28)	5	0	(Cyprus Football Association) Pafos

== Italy ==
Manager: Roberto Mancini

Italy announced a 26-man squad on 29 May 2023. The final 23-man squad was announced on 6 June 2023. On 14 June, Alessandro Bastoni withdrew from the squad due to illness and was replaced by Alessandro Buongiorno.

No.	Pos.	Player	Date of birth (age)	Caps	Goals	Club
1	GK	Gianluigi Donnarumma	25 February 1999 (aged 24)	52	0	(French Football Federation) Paris Saint-Germain
2	DF	Giovanni Di Lorenzo	4 August 1993 (aged 29)	27	3	(Italian Football Federation) Napoli
3	DF	Federico Dimarco	10 November 1997 (aged 25)	8	1	(Italian Football Federation) Internazionale
4	DF	Leonardo Spinazzola	25 March 1993 (aged 30)	22	0	(Italian Football Federation) Roma
5	DF	Matteo Darmian	2 December 1989 (aged 33)	37	1	(Italian Football Federation) Internazionale
6	MF	Marco Verratti	5 November 1992 (aged 30)	53	1	(French Football Federation) Paris Saint-Germain
7	MF	Davide Frattesi	22 September 1999 (aged 23)	4	0	(Italian Football Federation) Sassuolo
8	MF	Jorginho	20 December 1991 (aged 31)	47	5	(The Football Association) Arsenal
9	FW	Mateo Retegui	29 April 1999 (aged 24)	2	2	(Argentine Football Association) Tigre
10	MF	Lorenzo Pellegrini	19 June 1996 (aged 26)	25	7	(Italian Football Federation) Roma
11	MF	Nicolò Zaniolo	2 July 1999 (aged 23)	11	2	(Turkish Football Federation) Galatasaray
12	GK	Alex Meret	22 February 1997 (aged 26)	3	0	(Italian Football Federation) Napoli
13	DF	Rafael Tolói	10 October 1990 (aged 32)	12	0	(Italian Football Federation) Atalanta
14	FW	Federico Chiesa	25 October 1997 (aged 25)	40	4	(Italian Football Federation) Juventus
15	DF	Francesco Acerbi	10 February 1988 (aged 35)	29	1	(Italian Football Federation) Internazionale
16	MF	Bryan Cristante	3 March 1995 (aged 28)	31	2	(Italian Football Federation) Roma
17	FW	Ciro Immobile	20 February 1990 (aged 33)	55	15	(Italian Football Federation) Lazio
18	MF	Nicolò Barella	7 February 1997 (aged 26)	43	8	(Italian Football Federation) Internazionale
19	DF	Leonardo Bonucci (captain)	1 May 1987 (aged 36)	120	8	(Italian Football Federation) Juventus
20	FW	Wilfried Gnonto	5 November 2003 (aged 19)	10	1	(The Football Association) Leeds United
21	GK	Guglielmo Vicario	7 October 1996 (aged 26)	0	0	(Italian Football Federation) Empoli
22	FW	Giacomo Raspadori	18 February 2000 (aged 23)	17	5	(Italian Football Federation) Napoli
23	DF	Alessandro Buongiorno	6 June 1999 (aged 24)	0	0	(Italian Football Federation) Torino

== Netherlands ==
Manager: Ronald Koeman

The Netherlands announced a 26-man squad on 29 May 2023. The final 23-man squad was announced on 6 June 2023. On 13 June, Matthijs de Ligt was replaced by Daley Blind due to injury.

No.	Pos.	Player	Date of birth (age)	Caps	Goals	Club
1	GK	Justin Bijlow	22 January 1998 (aged 25)	6	0	(Royal Dutch Football Association) Feyenoord
2	DF	Jurriën Timber	17 June 2001 (aged 21)	15	0	(Royal Dutch Football Association) Ajax
3	DF	Daley Blind	9 March 1990 (aged 33)	101	3	(German Football Association) Bayern Munich
4	DF	Virgil van Dijk (captain)	8 July 1991 (aged 31)	56	6	(The Football Association) Liverpool
5	DF	Nathan Aké	18 February 1995 (aged 28)	36	5	(The Football Association) Manchester City
6	MF	Mats Wieffer	16 November 1999 (aged 23)	1	0	(Royal Dutch Football Association) Feyenoord
7	FW	Steven Bergwijn	8 October 1997 (aged 25)	28	7	(Royal Dutch Football Association) Ajax
8	MF	Georginio Wijnaldum	11 November 1990 (aged 32)	88	26	(Italian Football Federation) Roma
9	FW	Cody Gakpo	7 May 1999 (aged 24)	15	6	(The Football Association) Liverpool
10	FW	Noa Lang	17 June 1999 (aged 23)	6	1	(Royal Belgian Football Association) Club Brugge
11	MF	Xavi Simons	21 April 2003 (aged 20)	3	0	(Royal Dutch Football Association) PSV Eindhoven
12	DF	Lutsharel Geertruida	18 July 2000 (aged 22)	1	0	(Royal Dutch Football Association) Feyenoord
13	GK	Mark Flekken	13 June 1993 (aged 30)	4	0	(German Football Association) SC Freiburg
14	DF	Sven Botman	12 January 2000 (aged 23)	0	0	(The Football Association) Newcastle United
15	MF	Marten de Roon	29 March 1991 (aged 32)	36	0	(Italian Football Federation) Atalanta
16	DF	Tyrell Malacia	17 August 1999 (aged 23)	8	0	(The Football Association) Manchester United
17	MF	Joey Veerman	19 November 1998 (aged 24)	0	0	(Royal Dutch Football Association) PSV Eindhoven
18	FW	Donyell Malen	19 January 1999 (aged 24)	21	4	(German Football Association) Borussia Dortmund
19	FW	Wout Weghorst	7 August 1992 (aged 30)	21	5	(The Football Association) Manchester United
20	MF	Teun Koopmeiners	28 February 1998 (aged 25)	15	1	(Italian Football Federation) Atalanta
21	MF	Frenkie de Jong	12 May 1997 (aged 26)	50	2	(Royal Spanish Football Federation) Barcelona
22	DF	Denzel Dumfries	18 April 1996 (aged 27)	43	6	(Italian Football Federation) Internazionale
23	GK	Andries Noppert	7 April 1994 (aged 29)	5	0	(Royal Dutch Football Association) Heerenveen

== Spain ==
Manager: Luis de la Fuente

Spain announced a 23-man squad on 2 June 2023. On 5 June, David García and Nico Williams withdrew from the squad due to injury and were replaced by Nacho and Ansu Fati, respectively. On 12 June, Juan Bernat withdrew from the squad due to injury and was replaced by Fran García.

No.	Pos.	Player	Date of birth (age)	Caps	Goals	Club
1	GK	Kepa Arrizabalaga	3 October 1994 (aged 28)	13	0	(The Football Association) Chelsea
2	DF	Dani Carvajal	11 January 1992 (aged 31)	35	0	(Royal Spanish Football Federation) Real Madrid
3	DF	Robin Le Normand	11 November 1996 (aged 26)	0	0	(Royal Spanish Football Federation) Real Sociedad
4	DF	Nacho	18 January 1990 (aged 33)	23	1	(Royal Spanish Football Federation) Real Madrid
5	MF	Martín Zubimendi	2 February 1999 (aged 24)	1	0	(Royal Spanish Football Federation) Real Sociedad
6	MF	Mikel Merino	22 June 1996 (aged 26)	13	0	(Royal Spanish Football Federation) Real Sociedad
7	FW	Álvaro Morata	23 October 1992 (aged 30)	62	30	(Royal Spanish Football Federation) Atlético Madrid
8	MF	Fabián Ruiz	3 April 1996 (aged 27)	16	1	(French Football Federation) Paris Saint-Germain
9	MF	Gavi	5 August 2004 (aged 18)	19	3	(Royal Spanish Football Federation) Barcelona
10	FW	Marco Asensio	21 January 1996 (aged 27)	35	2	(Royal Spanish Football Federation) Real Madrid
11	MF	Sergio Canales	16 February 1991 (aged 32)	10	1	(Royal Spanish Football Federation) Real Betis
12	FW	Ansu Fati	31 October 2002 (aged 20)	7	2	(Royal Spanish Football Federation) Barcelona
13	GK	David Raya	15 September 1995 (aged 27)	2	0	(The Football Association) Brentford
14	DF	Aymeric Laporte	27 May 1994 (aged 29)	20	1	(The Football Association) Manchester City
15	FW	Yéremy Pino	20 October 2002 (aged 20)	9	1	(Royal Spanish Football Federation) Villarreal
16	MF	Rodri	22 June 1996 (aged 26)	41	1	(The Football Association) Manchester City
17	DF	Fran García	14 August 1999 (aged 23)	0	0	(Royal Spanish Football Federation) Rayo Vallecano
18	DF	Jordi Alba (captain)	21 March 1989 (aged 34)	91	9	(Royal Spanish Football Federation) Barcelona
19	FW	Rodrigo	6 March 1991 (aged 32)	27	8	(The Football Association) Leeds United
20	FW	Joselu	27 March 1990 (aged 33)	2	2	(Royal Spanish Football Federation) Espanyol
21	FW	Dani Olmo	7 May 1998 (aged 25)	30	6	(German Football Association) RB Leipzig
22	DF	Jesús Navas	21 November 1985 (aged 37)	46	5	(Royal Spanish Football Federation) Sevilla
23	GK	Unai Simón	11 June 1997 (aged 26)	31	0	(Royal Spanish Football Federation) Athletic Bilbao
