= Antonio Gagliardi =

Italian football coach

Personal information
- Full name: Antonio Gagliardi
- Date of birth: 11 August 1983 (age 43)
- Place of birth: Marostica, Italy

Team information
- Current team: Italy national football team (assistant coach)

Managerial career
- Years: Team
- 2008–2021: Italy national football team (match analyst)
- 2020–2021: Juventus FC (assistant coach)
- 2021–2022: Fatih Karagümrük S.K. (assistant coach)
- 2023–2024: Saudi Arabia national football team (assistant coach)
- 2025: Parma Calcio 1913 (assistant manager)
- 2025–2026: Iran national football team (assistant coach)
- 2026-: Italy national football team (technical collaborator)

Antonio Gagliardi (born 11 August 1983) is an Italian football coach who serves as a technical collaborator for the Italy national football team under head coach Roberto Mancini. He previously worked as a match analyst and assistant coach for the Italy national football team, contributing to their victory at UEFA Euro 2020.

Gagliardi holds a UEFA Pro Licence.

== Career ==
Gagliardi began his coaching career in 2008 as a match analyst for the Italy national football team, working under managers including Roberto Donadoni, Cesare Prandelli, Antonio Conte, Gian Piero Ventura, Luigi Di Biagio, and Roberto Mancini. He served as lead match analyst during UEFA Euro 2020, where Italy won the tournament. He described the victory as completing a "perfect circle" after years of ups and downs with the national team.

In the 2020–21 season, Gagliardi was an assistant coach at Juventus FC under Andrea Pirlo. He later followed Pirlo to Fatih Karagümrük S.K. in Turkey for the 2021–22 season.

From 2023 to 2024, he served as assistant coach for the Saudi Arabia national football team under Mancini.

In 2025, Gagliardi joined Parma Calcio 1913 as assistant manager under Cristian Chivu, and briefly served as interim head coach for one match due to Chivu's suspension.

In November 2025, he was appointed assistant coach of the Iran national team ahead of the 2026 FIFA World Cup.

In August 2026, Gagliardi was appointed a technical collaborator of the Italy national football team under head coach Roberto Mancini, returning to the national team after previously working as Mancini's match analyst.

== Honours ==
As technical staff:

- UEFA European Championship: 2020 (with Italy)
- Coppa Italia: 2020–21 (with Juventus)
- Supercoppa Italiana: 2020-21 (with Juventus)
