= 2021 UEFA Nations League Finals squads =

Team squads of 2021 Nations League Finals

The 2021 UEFA Nations League Finals was an international football tournament held in Italy from 6 to 10 October 2021. The four national teams involved in the tournament were required to register a squad of up to 23 players – of which three had to be goalkeepers – by 30 September 2021, 23:59 CEST (UTC+2), six days prior to the opening match of the tournament. Only players in these squads were eligible to take part in the tournament.

In the event that a player on the submitted squad list suffered from an injury or illness prior to his team's first match of the tournament, that player could be replaced, provided that the team doctor and a doctor from the UEFA Medical Committee both confirmed that the injury or illness was severe enough to prevent the player from participating in the tournament. Players who either tested positive for SARS-CoV-2 or had been declared as "close contacts" of a positive SARS-CoV-2 tested person – and therefore were put in isolation by the decision of health authorities – were considered cases of serious illness and could therefore be replaced before the first match. If a group of players of a team were placed into mandatory quarantine or self-isolation prior to a match following a decision from national or local health officials due to positive SARS-CoV-2 tests, and fewer than 13 players were available (including at least one goalkeeper), additional players could be called up to meet the minimum of 13 players required. In such a case, an equivalent number of quarantined players had to be definitively withdrawn from the 23-player list.

The position listed for each player is per the official squad lists published by UEFA. The age listed for each player is their age as of 6 October 2021, the first day of the tournament. The numbers of caps and goals listed for each player do not include any matches played after the start of the tournament. The club listed is the club for which the player last played a competitive match prior to the tournament. The nationality for each club reflects the national association (not the league) to which the club is affiliated. A flag is included for coaches who are of a different nationality to their team.

== Belgium ==
Manager: (Spain) Roberto Martínez

Belgium's final squad was announced on 1 October 2021, with Matz Sels also selected as a stand-by goalkeeper. Thomas Meunier withdrew injured and was replaced by Thomas Foket on 5 October. Thorgan Hazard withdrew injured and was replaced by Arthur Theate on 6 October.

No.	Pos.	Player	Date of birth (age)	Caps	Goals	Club
1	GK	Thibaut Courtois	11 May 1992 (aged 29)	91	0	(Royal Spanish Football Federation) Real Madrid
2	DF	Toby Alderweireld	2 March 1989 (aged 32)	116	5	(Qatar Football Association) Al-Duhail
3	DF	Jason Denayer	28 June 1995 (aged 26)	30	1	(French Football Federation) Lyon
4	DF	Dedryck Boyata	28 November 1990 (aged 30)	27	0	(German Football Association) Hertha BSC
5	DF	Jan Vertonghen	24 April 1987 (aged 34)	132	9	(Portuguese Football Federation) Benfica
6	MF	Axel Witsel	12 January 1989 (aged 32)	116	11	(German Football Association) Borussia Dortmund
7	MF	Kevin De Bruyne	28 June 1991 (aged 30)	84	22	(The Football Association) Manchester City
8	MF	Youri Tielemans	7 May 1997 (aged 24)	45	4	(The Football Association) Leicester City
9	FW	Romelu Lukaku	13 May 1993 (aged 28)	100	67	(The Football Association) Chelsea
10	FW	Eden Hazard (captain)	7 January 1991 (aged 30)	114	33	(Royal Spanish Football Federation) Real Madrid
11	FW	Yannick Carrasco	4 September 1993 (aged 28)	51	6	(Royal Spanish Football Federation) Atlético Madrid
12	GK	Simon Mignolet	6 March 1988 (aged 33)	31	0	(Royal Belgian Football Association) Club Brugge
13	GK	Koen Casteels	25 June 1992 (aged 29)	2	0	(German Football Association) VfL Wolfsburg
14	FW	Dodi Lukebakio	24 September 1997 (aged 24)	4	0	(German Football Association) VfL Wolfsburg
15	DF	Thomas Foket	25 September 1994 (aged 27)	7	1	(French Football Federation) Reims
16	DF	Arthur Theate	25 May 2000 (aged 21)	0	0	(Italian Football Federation) Bologna
17	MF	Hans Vanaken	24 August 1992 (aged 29)	13	3	(Royal Belgian Football Association) Club Brugge
18	FW	Charles De Ketelaere	10 March 2001 (aged 20)	1	0	(Royal Belgian Football Association) Club Brugge
19	MF	Leander Dendoncker	15 April 1995 (aged 26)	23	0	(The Football Association) Wolverhampton Wanderers
20	FW	Leandro Trossard	4 December 1994 (aged 26)	11	2	(The Football Association) Brighton & Hove Albion
21	DF	Timothy Castagne	5 December 1995 (aged 25)	17	2	(The Football Association) Leicester City
22	MF	Alexis Saelemaekers	27 June 1999 (aged 22)	4	1	(Italian Football Federation) Milan
23	FW	Michy Batshuayi	2 October 1993 (aged 28)	37	22	(Turkish Football Federation) Beşiktaş

== France ==
Manager: Didier Deschamps

France's final squad was announced on 30 September 2021.

No.	Pos.	Player	Date of birth (age)	Caps	Goals	Club
1	GK	Hugo Lloris (captain)	26 December 1986 (aged 34)	132	0	(The Football Association) Tottenham Hotspur
2	DF	Benjamin Pavard	28 March 1996 (aged 25)	38	2	(German Football Association) Bayern Munich
3	DF	Presnel Kimpembe	13 August 1995 (aged 26)	24	0	(French Football Federation) Paris Saint-Germain
4	DF	Raphaël Varane	25 April 1993 (aged 28)	81	5	(The Football Association) Manchester United
5	DF	Jules Koundé	12 November 1998 (aged 22)	3	0	(Royal Spanish Football Federation) Sevilla
6	MF	Paul Pogba	15 March 1993 (aged 28)	87	11	(The Football Association) Manchester United
7	FW	Antoine Griezmann	21 March 1991 (aged 30)	98	41	(Royal Spanish Football Federation) Atlético Madrid
8	MF	Aurélien Tchouaméni	27 January 2000 (aged 21)	3	0	(French Football Federation) Monaco
9	FW	Anthony Martial	5 December 1995 (aged 25)	30	2	(The Football Association) Manchester United
10	FW	Kylian Mbappé	20 December 1998 (aged 22)	49	17	(French Football Federation) Paris Saint-Germain
11	FW	Moussa Diaby	7 July 1999 (aged 22)	2	0	(German Football Association) Bayer Leverkusen
12	DF	Léo Dubois	14 September 1994 (aged 27)	10	0	(French Football Federation) Lyon
13	MF	Matteo Guendouzi	14 April 1999 (aged 22)	0	0	(French Football Federation) Marseille
14	MF	Adrien Rabiot	3 April 1995 (aged 26)	21	0	(Italian Football Federation) Juventus
15	DF	Dayot Upamecano	27 October 1998 (aged 22)	3	1	(German Football Association) Bayern Munich
16	GK	Benoît Costil	3 July 1987 (aged 34)	1	0	(French Football Federation) Bordeaux
17	MF	Jordan Veretout	1 March 1993 (aged 28)	2	0	(Italian Football Federation) Roma
18	DF	Lucas Digne	20 July 1993 (aged 28)	42	0	(The Football Association) Everton
19	FW	Karim Benzema	19 December 1987 (aged 33)	90	31	(Royal Spanish Football Federation) Real Madrid
20	FW	Wissam Ben Yedder	12 August 1990 (aged 31)	15	2	(French Football Federation) Monaco
21	DF	Lucas Hernandez	14 February 1996 (aged 25)	28	0	(German Football Association) Bayern Munich
22	DF	Théo Hernandez	6 October 1997 (aged 24)	1	0	(Italian Football Federation) Milan
23	GK	Mike Maignan	3 July 1995 (aged 26)	1	0	(Italian Football Federation) Milan

== Italy ==
Manager: Roberto Mancini

Italy's final squad was announced on 30 September 2021. Ciro Immobile and Rafael Tolói withdrew injured and were replaced by Moise Kean and Davide Calabria, respectively, on 3 October. Matteo Pessina withdrew injured and was replaced by Federico Dimarco on 4 October.

No.	Pos.	Player	Date of birth (age)	Caps	Goals	Club
1	GK	Salvatore Sirigu	12 January 1987 (aged 34)	28	0	(Italian Football Federation) Genoa
2	DF	Giovanni Di Lorenzo	4 August 1993 (aged 28)	15	1	(Italian Football Federation) Napoli
3	DF	Giorgio Chiellini (captain)	14 August 1984 (aged 37)	113	8	(Italian Football Federation) Juventus
4	DF	Davide Calabria	6 December 1996 (aged 24)	3	0	(Italian Football Federation) Milan
5	MF	Manuel Locatelli	8 January 1998 (aged 23)	16	3	(Italian Football Federation) Juventus
6	MF	Marco Verratti	5 November 1992 (aged 28)	47	3	(French Football Federation) Paris Saint-Germain
7	MF	Lorenzo Pellegrini	19 June 1996 (aged 25)	18	2	(Italian Football Federation) Roma
8	MF	Jorginho	20 December 1991 (aged 29)	38	5	(The Football Association) Chelsea
9	FW	Giacomo Raspadori	18 February 2000 (aged 21)	5	1	(Italian Football Federation) Sassuolo
10	FW	Lorenzo Insigne	4 June 1991 (aged 30)	49	10	(Italian Football Federation) Napoli
11	FW	Domenico Berardi	1 August 1994 (aged 27)	20	5	(Italian Football Federation) Sassuolo
12	DF	Federico Dimarco	10 November 1997 (aged 23)	0	0	(Italian Football Federation) Inter Milan
13	DF	Emerson Palmieri	3 August 1994 (aged 27)	21	0	(French Football Federation) Lyon
14	FW	Federico Chiesa	25 October 1997 (aged 23)	34	4	(Italian Football Federation) Juventus
15	DF	Francesco Acerbi	10 February 1988 (aged 33)	19	1	(Italian Football Federation) Lazio
16	MF	Bryan Cristante	3 March 1995 (aged 26)	19	1	(Italian Football Federation) Roma
17	FW	Moise Kean	28 February 2000 (aged 21)	10	4	(Italian Football Federation) Juventus
18	MF	Nicolò Barella	7 February 1997 (aged 24)	31	6	(Italian Football Federation) Inter Milan
19	DF	Leonardo Bonucci	1 May 1987 (aged 34)	111	8	(Italian Football Federation) Juventus
20	MF	Federico Bernardeschi	16 February 1994 (aged 27)	35	6	(Italian Football Federation) Juventus
21	GK	Gianluigi Donnarumma	25 February 1999 (aged 22)	36	0	(French Football Federation) Paris Saint-Germain
22	GK	Alex Meret	22 March 1997 (aged 24)	2	0	(Italian Football Federation) Napoli
23	DF	Alessandro Bastoni	13 April 1999 (aged 22)	7	0	(Italian Football Federation) Inter Milan

== Spain ==
Manager: Luis Enrique

Spain's final squad was announced on 30 September 2021. Pedri withdrew injured and was replaced by Brais Méndez on 1 October. Marcos Llorente and Brais Méndez withdrew injured and were replaced by Bryan Gil and Sergi Roberto, respectively, on 3 October.

No.	Pos.	Player	Date of birth (age)	Caps	Goals	Club
1	GK	David de Gea	7 November 1990 (aged 30)	45	0	(The Football Association) Manchester United
2	DF	César Azpilicueta	28 August 1989 (aged 32)	32	1	(The Football Association) Chelsea
3	DF	Pau Torres	16 January 1997 (aged 24)	14	1	(Royal Spanish Football Federation) Villarreal
4	DF	Iñigo Martínez	17 May 1991 (aged 30)	16	0	(Royal Spanish Football Federation) Athletic Bilbao
5	MF	Sergio Busquets (captain)	16 July 1988 (aged 33)	129	2	(Royal Spanish Football Federation) Barcelona
6	MF	Bryan Gil	11 February 2001 (aged 20)	3	0	(The Football Association) Tottenham Hotspur
7	FW	Yeremy Pino	20 October 2002 (aged 18)	0	0	(Royal Spanish Football Federation) Villarreal
8	MF	Koke	8 January 1992 (aged 29)	58	0	(Royal Spanish Football Federation) Atlético Madrid
9	MF	Gavi	5 August 2004 (aged 17)	0	0	(Royal Spanish Football Federation) Barcelona
10	MF	Sergi Roberto	7 February 1992 (aged 29)	10	1	(Royal Spanish Football Federation) Barcelona
11	FW	Ferran Torres	29 February 2000 (aged 21)	20	10	(The Football Association) Manchester City
12	DF	Eric García	9 January 2001 (aged 20)	13	0	(Royal Spanish Football Federation) Barcelona
13	GK	Robert Sánchez	18 November 1997 (aged 23)	1	0	(The Football Association) Brighton & Hove Albion
14	DF	Sergio Reguilón	16 December 1996 (aged 24)	6	0	(The Football Association) Tottenham Hotspur
15	DF	Pedro Porro	13 September 1999 (aged 22)	1	0	(Portuguese Football Federation) Sporting CP
16	MF	Rodri	22 June 1996 (aged 25)	27	1	(The Football Association) Manchester City
17	DF	Marcos Alonso	28 December 1990 (aged 30)	3	0	(The Football Association) Chelsea
18	MF	Pablo Fornals	22 February 1996 (aged 25)	4	1	(The Football Association) West Ham United
19	DF	Aymeric Laporte	27 May 1994 (aged 27)	10	1	(The Football Association) Manchester City
20	MF	Mikel Merino	22 June 1996 (aged 25)	8	0	(Royal Spanish Football Federation) Real Sociedad
21	MF	Mikel Oyarzabal	21 April 1997 (aged 24)	19	5	(Royal Spanish Football Federation) Real Sociedad
22	FW	Pablo Sarabia	11 May 1992 (aged 29)	12	4	(Portuguese Football Federation) Sporting CP
23	GK	Unai Simón	11 June 1997 (aged 24)	16	0	(Royal Spanish Football Federation) Athletic Bilbao
