= Italy national football team =

Men's association football team

Italy
- Nickname(s): Gli Azzurri (The Blues); La Nazionale (The National Team)
- Association: Federazione Italiana Giuoco Calcio (FIGC)
- Confederation: UEFA (Europe)
- Head coach: Roberto Mancini
- Captain: Gianluigi Donnarumma
- Most caps: Gianluigi Buffon (176)
- Top scorer: Gigi Riva (35)
- Home stadium: Various
- FIFA code: ITA
First colours	Second colours

FIFA ranking
- Current: 14 ▲1 (18 November 2026)
- Highest: 1 (November 1993, February 2007, April–June 2007, September 2007)
- Lowest: 21 (June 2018)

First international
- Italy 6–2 France (Milan, Italy; 15 May 1910)

Biggest win
- Italy 9–0 United States (Brentford, England; 2 August 1948)

Biggest defeat
- Hungary 7–1 Italy (Budapest, Hungary; 6 April 1924)

World Cup
- Appearances: 18 (first in 1934)
- Best result: Champions (1934, 1938, 1982, 2006)

European Championship
- Appearances: 11 (first in 1968)
- Best result: Champions (1968, 2020)

Nations League Finals
- Appearances: 2 (first in 2021)
- Best result: Third place (2021, 2023)

CONMEBOL–UEFA Cup of Champions
- Appearances: 1 (first in 2022)
- Best result: Runners-up (2022)

Olympic Games
- Appearances: 10 (first in 1912)
- Best result: Gold medal (1936)

Confederations Cup
- Appearances: 2 (first in 2009)
- Best result: Third place (2013)
Medal record
Men's football
FIFA World Cup
Gold medal – first place	1934 Italy	Team
Gold medal – first place	1938 France	Team
Gold medal – first place	1982 Spain	Team
Gold medal – first place	2006 Germany	Team
Silver medal – second place	1970 Mexico	Team
Silver medal – second place	1994 United States	Team
Bronze medal – third place	1990 Italy	Team
FIFA Confederations Cup
Bronze medal – third place	2013 Brazil	Team
Olympic Games
Gold medal – first place	1936 Berlin	Team
Bronze medal – third place	1928 Amsterdam	Team
UEFA European Championship
Gold medal – first place	1968 Italy	Team
Gold medal – first place	2020 Europe	Team
Silver medal – second place	2000 Netherlands and Belgium	Team
Silver medal – second place	2012 Poland and Ukraine	Team
UEFA Nations League
Bronze medal – third place	2021 Italy	Team
Bronze medal – third place	2023 Netherlands	Team
CONMEBOL–UEFA Cup of Champions
Silver medal – second place	2022 England	Team
Central European International Cup
Gold medal – first place	1927–30	Team
Gold medal – first place	1933–35	Team
Silver medal – second place	1931–32	Team
- Website: FIGC.it (in Italian and English)

The Italy national football team (Italian: Nazionale di calcio dell'Italia) has represented Italy in men's international football since its first match in 1910. The team is controlled by the Italian Football Federation (FIGC), the governing body for football in Italy and a founding member of UEFA. Italy plays its home matches at various stadiums across the country, while its training center and technical headquarters, the Centro Tecnico Federale di Coverciano, is located in Florence.

Italy is one of the most successful national teams in international football. It has won the FIFA World Cup four times (1934, 1938, 1982, and 2006), becoming the first team to successfully defend the title, and has also finished as runners-up in 1970 and 1994. Italy has won the UEFA European Championship twice (1968 and 2020), finishing as runner-ups in 2000 and 2012, and won the Olympic football tournament in 1936. Italy also finished third in the FIFA Confederations Cup (2013) and the UEFA Nations League (2021 and 2023).

The team is known as gli Azzurri (the Blues), after Savoy blue, the traditional colour of the House of Savoy. Italy has long-standing rivalries with Brazil, France, Germany, and to a lesser extent with Spain and England. The team has reached the top of the FIFA World Rankings in 1993 and 2007. Between 2018 and 2021, Italy set a record unbeaten run of 37 competitive men's international matches, which was surpassed by Spain in 2026. Italy has failed to qualify for the last three World Cups (2018, 2022 and 2026), marking its longest absence in the competition.

== History ==
=== Origins and first two World Cup titles in 1934 and 1938 ===
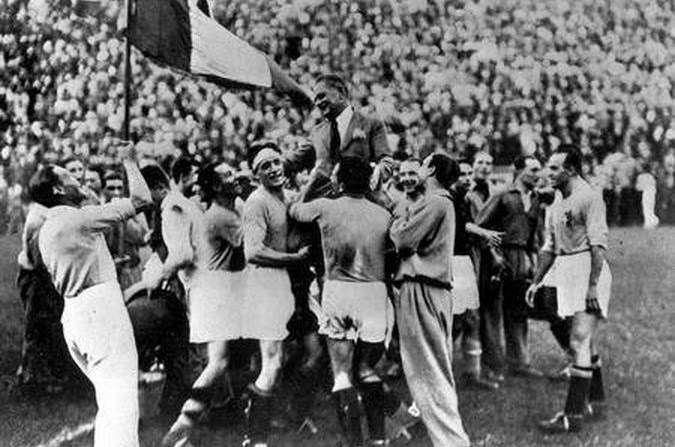
The squad celebrating its first FIFA World Cup in 1934

An early attempt to create an Italian national team occurred on 30 April 1899, when an Italian selection played a Swiss eleven, losing 0–2 in Turin. The team's first official match was held in Milan on 15 May 1910. Italy defeated France by a score of 6–2, with Italy's first goal scored by Pietro Lana. The Italian team played with a (2–3–5) system and consisted of De Simoni, Varisco, Calì, Trerè, Fossati, Capello, Debernardi, Rizzi, Cevenini I, Lana, Boiocchi, with Calì as the team's first captain.

The first success in an official tournament was the bronze medal at the 1928 Summer Olympics in Amsterdam. After losing the semi-final against Uruguay, an 11–3 victory against Egypt secured third place in the competition. In the 1927–30 and 1933–35 Central European International Cup, Italy achieved first place out of five Central European teams, topping the group with 11 points in both editions of the tournament. Italy would also later win the gold medal at the 1936 Summer Olympics with a 2–1 victory in extra time in the gold medal match over Austria on 15 August 1936.

After declining to participate in the inaugural World Cup (1930, in Uruguay) the Italy national team won two consecutive editions of the tournament in 1934 and 1938, under the direction of coach Vittorio Pozzo and the performance of Giuseppe Meazza, who is considered one of the best Italian football players of all time by some. Italy hosted the 1934 World Cup, and played their first ever World Cup match in a 7–1 win over the United States in Rome. Italy defeated Czechoslovakia 2–1 in extra time in the final in Rome, with goals by Raimundo Orsi and Angelo Schiavio to achieve their first World Cup title. They achieved their second title in 1938 in a 4–2 defeat of Hungary, with two goals by Gino Colaussi and two goals by Silvio Piola in the World Cup that followed. It is rumored that before the 1938 finals fascist Italian Prime Minister Benito Mussolini sent a telegram to the team, saying "Vincere o morire!" (literally translated as "Win or die!"). However, no record remains of such a telegram, and World Cup player Pietro Rava said when interviewed: "No, no, no, that's not true. He sent a telegram wishing us well, but no never 'win or die'."

=== Reconstruction in the 1950s and 1960s ===
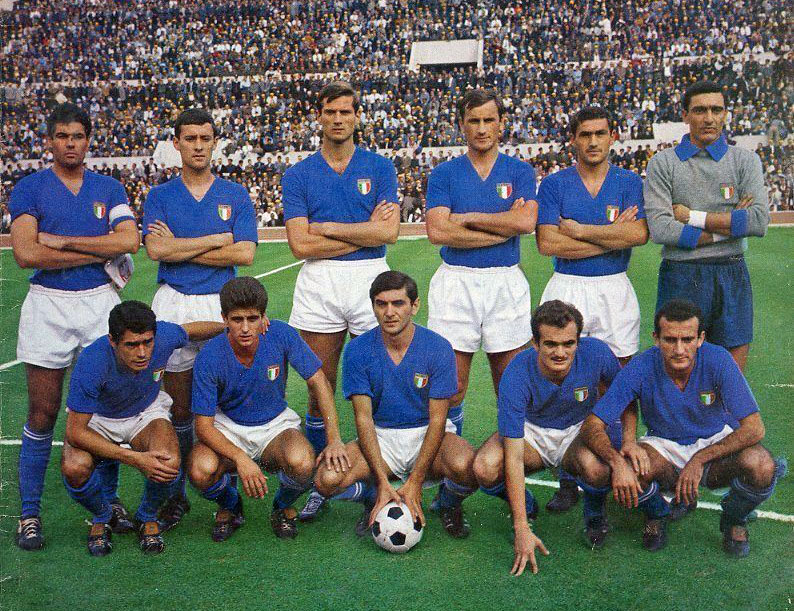
The Italy national team in 1965

In 1949, 10 of the 11 players in the team's initial line-up were killed in a plane crash that affected Torino, winners of the previous five Serie A titles. Italy did not advance further than the first round of the 1950 World Cup, as they were weakened severely due to the air disaster. The team had travelled by boat rather than by plane, fearing another accident.

In the 1954 and 1962 World Cups, Italy failed to progress past the first round, and did not qualify for the 1958 World Cup due to a 2–1 defeat to Northern Ireland in the last match of the qualifying round. Italy did not take part in the first edition of the European Championship in 1960 (then known as the European Nations Cup), and was knocked out by the Soviet Union in the first round of the 1964 European Nations' Cup qualifying.

Their participation in the 1966 World Cup was ended by a 0–1 defeat at the hands of North Korea. Despite being the tournament favourites, the Azzurri, whose 1966 squad included Gianni Rivera and Giacomo Bulgarelli, were eliminated in the first round by the semi-professional North Koreans. The Italian team was bitterly condemned upon their return home, while North Korean scorer Pak Doo-ik was celebrated as the David who killed Goliath. Upon Italy's return home, furious fans threw fruit and rotten tomatoes at their transport bus at the airport.

=== European champions and World Cup runners-up (1968–1974) ===
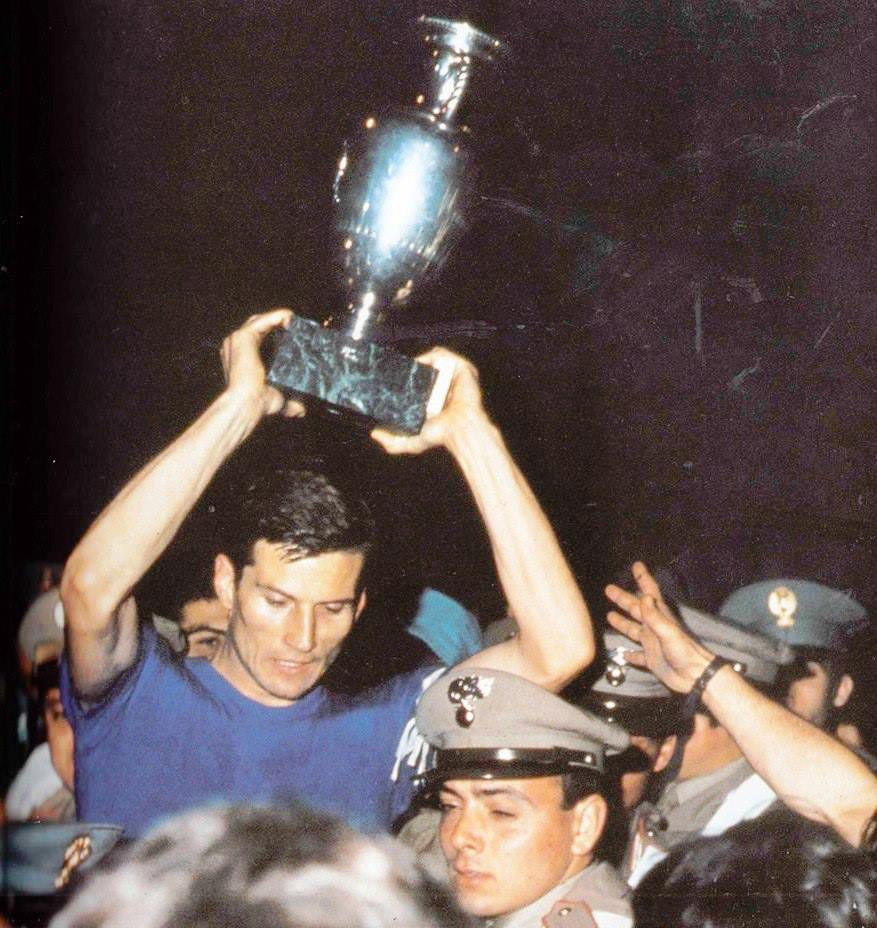
Captain Giacinto Facchetti celebrates Italy's UEFA Euro 1968 victory.

In 1968, Italy hosted the European Championship and won the tournament in its first participation, beating Yugoslavia in Rome and winning their first major competition since the 1938 World Cup. The final ended in a 1–1 draw after extra time, and the rules of the time required the match to be replayed a few days later. This would be the only time the final of the European Championship or World Cup was replayed. On 10 June 1968, Italy won the replay 2–0 (with goals from Gigi Riva and Pietro Anastasi) to take the trophy.

In the 1970 World Cup, exploiting the performances of European champions' players like Giacinto Facchetti, Gianni Rivera and Gigi Riva and with a new centre-forward Roberto Boninsegna, the team were able to return to the World Cup final match after 32 years. They reached this result after one of the most famous matches in football history—the "Game of the Century", the 1970 World Cup semifinal between Italy and West Germany that Italy won 4–3 in extra time, with five of the seven goals coming in extra time. They were later defeated by Brazil in the final 4–1.

After losing to Belgium in the quarter-finals to qualify for the 1972 European Championship, this generation's cycle ended at the 1974 World Cup, where the team was eliminated in the group stage after a 2–1 loss against Poland in the last match of the group.

=== Third World Cup title generation (1978–1986) ===
Under the initial guide of Fulvio Bernardini and later that of head coach Enzo Bearzot, a new generation of Italian players came to the international stage in the second half of the 1970s. At the 1978 World Cup, Italy was the only team in the tournament to beat the eventual champions and host team Argentina, and the Azzurri made it to the third-place final, where they were defeated by Brazil 2–1. In the second round group stage match against the Netherlands, which prevented Italy from reaching the final, Italian goalkeeper Dino Zoff was beaten by a long-distance shot from Arie Haan, and Zoff was criticised for the defeat. Italy hosted the 1980 European Championship, the first edition to be held between eight teams instead of four, automatically qualifying for the finals as hosts. After two draws with Spain and Belgium and a narrow 1–0 win over England, Italy were beaten by Czechoslovakia in the third-place match on penalties 9–8 after Fulvio Collovati missed his kick.

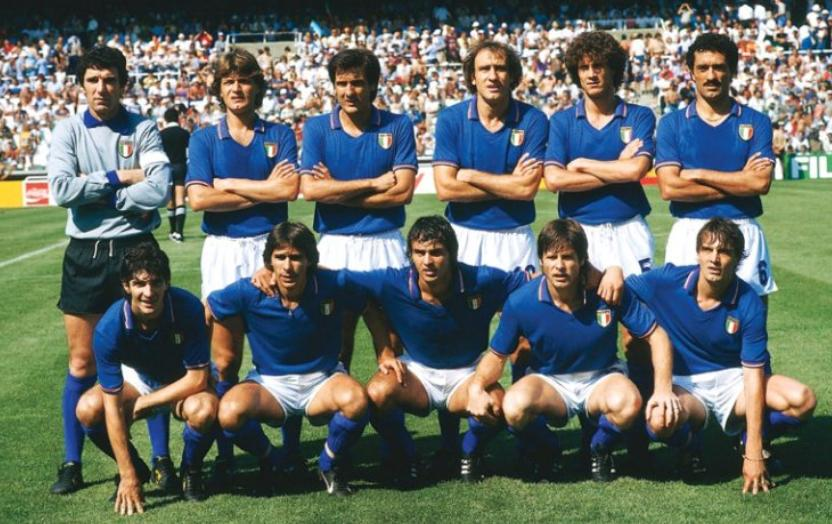
Italy's starting line-up, before the match against Argentina in a group stage game at the 1982 FIFA World Cup

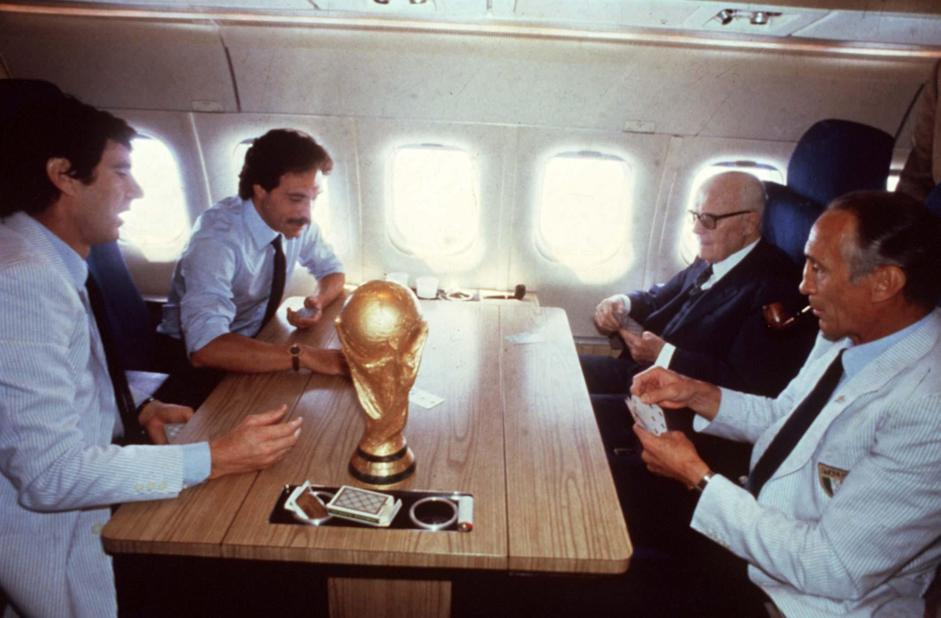
One of the widely remembered pictures of the 1982 World Cup, Italian President Sandro Pertini playing scopone with Dino Zoff, Franco Causio and coach Bearzot.

After a scandal in Serie A, where some national team players such as Paolo Rossi were prosecuted and suspended for match fixing and illegal betting, the Azzurri qualified for the second round of the 1982 World Cup after three uninspiring draws against Poland, Peru, and Cameroon. Having been loudly criticised, the Italian team decided on a press black-out from then on, with only coach Enzo Bearzot and captain Dino Zoff appointed to speak to the press. Italy's second group was a group of death with Argentina and Brazil. In the opener, Italy prevailed 2–1 over Argentina, with Italy's goals, both left-footed strikes, being scored by Marco Tardelli and Antonio Cabrini. After Brazil defeated Argentina 3–1, Italy needed to win in order to advance to the semi-finals. Italy took the lead twice with Paolo Rossi's goals, and twice Brazil came back. When Falcão scored to equalise at 2–2, Brazil would have been through on goal difference, but in the 74th minute Rossi scored the winning goal, for a hat-trick, in a crowded penalty area to send Italy to the semifinals after one of the greatest games in World Cup history. Italy then progressed to the semi-final where they defeated Poland with two goals from Rossi.

In the final on 11 July 1982, Italy met West Germany in Madrid. The first half ended scoreless, after Antonio Cabrini missed a penalty awarded for a Hans-Peter Briegel foul on Bruno Conti. In the second half Paolo Rossi again scored the first goal, and while the Germans were pushing forward in search of an equaliser, Marco Tardelli and substitute Alessandro Altobelli finalised two contropiede counterattacks to make it 3–0. Paul Breitner scored West Germany's consolation goal seven minutes before the end. Tardelli's screaming celebration after his goal was one of the defining images of Italy's 1982 World Cup triumph. Paolo Rossi won the Golden Boot with six goals as well as the Golden Ball Award for the best player of the tournament, and 40-year-old captain-goalkeeper Dino Zoff became the oldest player to win the World Cup.

Italy subsequently failed to qualify for UEFA Euro 1984, and then entered as reigning champions in the 1986 World Cup, but were eliminated by reigning European Champions, France, in the round of 16.

=== Vicini years and World Cup runners-up with Sacchi (1986–1994) ===
In 1986, Azeglio Vicini was appointed as new head coach, replacing Bearzot. He granted a central role to players such as Walter Zenga and Gianluca Vialli, and conceded a chance to young players coming from the U21 team; Vialli scored goals that gave Italy a 1988 European Championship pass, and he was shown like Altobelli's successor, having his same goal attitude. Both forwards stroke the target in Germany, where the Soviet Union defeated the Azzurri in the semi-finals.

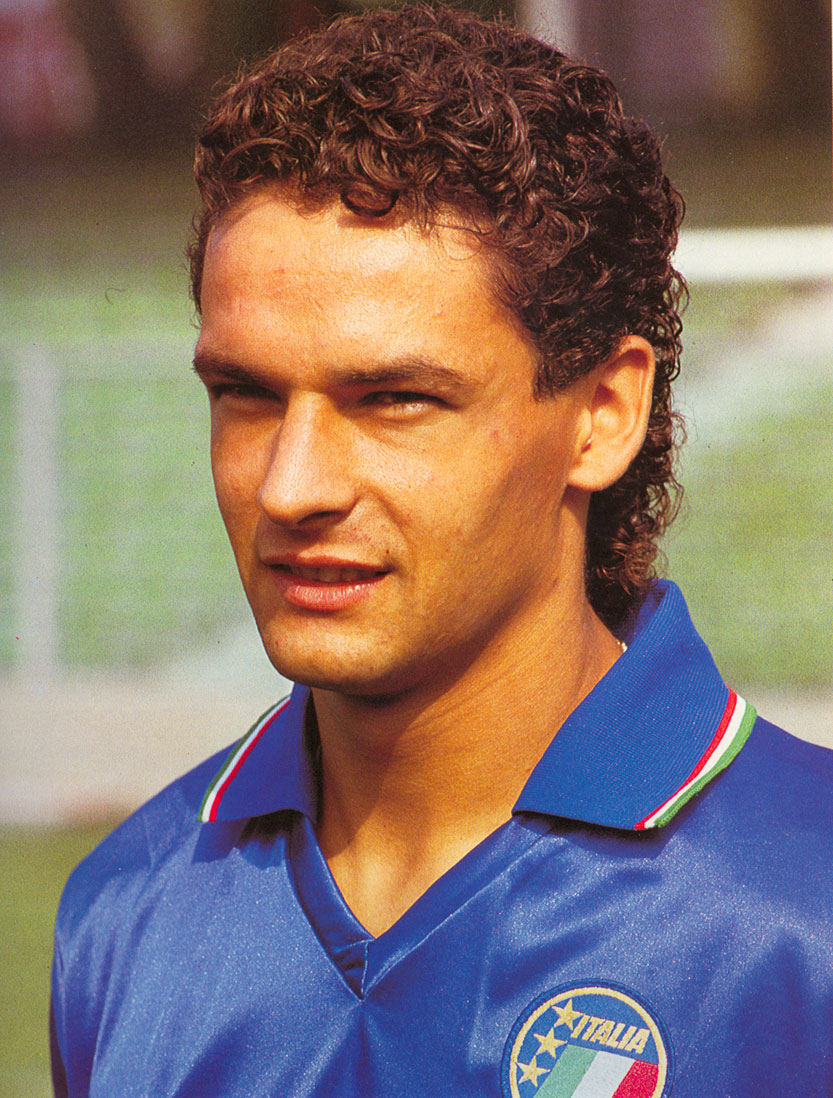
Roberto Baggio in 1990

Italy hosted the World Cup for the second time in 1990. The Italian attack featured talented forwards Salvatore Schillaci and a young Roberto Baggio. Italy played nearly all of their matches in Rome and did not concede a single goal in their first five matches; however, they lost the semi-final in Naples to defending champion Argentina. Argentinian player Diego Maradona, who played for Napoli, made comments prior to the game pertaining to the North–South inequality in Italy and the Risorgimento, asking Neapolitans to root for Argentina in the game. Italy lost 4–3 on penalty kicks following a 1–1 draw after extra time. Schillaci's first-half opener was equalised in the second half by Claudio Caniggia's header for Argentina. Aldo Serena missed the final penalty kick with Roberto Donadoni also having his penalty saved by goalkeeper Sergio Goycochea. Italy went on to defeat England 2–1 in the third-place match in Bari, with Schillaci scoring the winning goal on a penalty to become the tournament's top scorer with six goals.

After failing to qualify for UEFA Euro 1992, Vicini was replaced by former AC Milan coach Arrigo Sacchi, who brought a new style of play. In November 1993, FIFA ranked Italy No. 1 since the ranking system was introduced in December 1992.

At the 1994 World Cup in the United States, Italy lost the opening match against Ireland 0–1 at Giants Stadium in New Jersey. After a 1–0 win against Norway in East Rutherford and a 1–1 draw with Mexico at the RFK Stadium in Washington, D.C., Italy advanced from Group E based on goals scored among the four teams tied on points. During their round of 16 match at Foxboro Stadium near Boston, Italy was down 0–1 late against Nigeria, but Baggio equalised in the 88th minute and a penalty in extra time to take the win. Baggio scored another late goal against Spain at their quarter-final match in Boston to seal a 2–1 win and two goals against Bulgaria in their semi-final match in New York for another 2–1 win. In the final, which took place in Los Angeles's Rose Bowl stadium 2,700 miles (4,320 km) and three time zones away from the Northeastern United States where they had played all their previous matches, Italy, who had 24 hours less rest than Brazil, played 120 minutes of scoreless football, taking the match to a penalty shootout, the first time a World Cup final was settled on penalties. Italy lost the subsequent shootout 3–2 after Baggio, who had been playing with the aid of a pain-killer injection and a heavily bandaged hamstring, missed the final penalty kick of the match, shooting over the crossbar.

=== Euro 2000 runners-up (1996–2000) ===
Italy, still led by Sacchi, qualified for Euro 1996 in England, but did not progress beyond the group stage. Having defeated Russia 2–1 and losing by the same score against the Czech Republic, Italy required a victory in their final group match against Germany to progress to the quarter-finals. However, Gianfranco Zola failed to convert a decisive penalty in a 0–0 draw against the Germans, who eventually won the tournament.

Finishing second behind England in the qualification campaign for the 1998 World Cup, Italy booked a place at the final tournament after defeating Russia in a play-off, with Pierluigi Casiraghi scoring the winning goal in a 2–1 aggregate victory on 15 November 1997. After finishing first in their group and overcoming Norway in the second round, Italy faced a penalty shoot-out in the quarterfinals, for the third World Cup in a row. The Italian side, where Alessandro Del Piero and Baggio renewed the controversial staffetta (lit. 'relay') between Mazzola and Rivera from 1970, held the eventual world champions and host team, France, to a 0–0 draw after extra time, but lost 4–3 in the shoot-out. With two goals scored in this tournament, Baggio remains the only Italian player to have scored in three different FIFA World Cups.

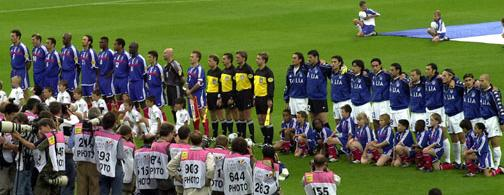
Italy (right) line-up ahead of the UEFA Euro 2000 Final against France

Two years later, at the Euro 2000, with four consecutive victories the team led by former captain Dino Zoff made it all the way to the semifinals, facing another penalty shoot-out but emerging victorious over the co-hosts, the Netherlands. Italian goalkeeper Francesco Toldo saved one penalty during the match and two in the shootout, while striker Francesco Totti scored his penalty with a cucchiaio (lit. 'spoon') chip. Italy finished the tournament as runners-up, losing the final 2–1 against France (to a golden goal in extra time) after conceding an equalising goal just 30 seconds before the expected end of injury time. After the defeat, coach Dino Zoff resigned in protest after being criticised by AC Milan club president and politician Silvio Berlusconi.

=== Trapattoni years (2000–2004) ===
Giovanni Trapattoni took charge of the team in July 2000 following the resignation of Dino Zoff. Playing in Group 8 of the 2002 FIFA World Cup qualification process, Italy finished undefeated after facing Romania, Georgia, Hungary and Lithuania. In the final tournament, a 2–0 victory against Ecuador with a double from Christian Vieri was followed by a series of controversial matches. During the match against Croatia, English referee Graham Poll incorrectly disallowed two regular goals resulting in a 2–1 defeat to Italy. Despite two goals being ruled for offsides, a late headed goal from Alessandro Del Piero helped Italy to a 1–1 draw with Mexico, proving enough to advance to the knockout stages.

Co-host country South Korea eliminated Italy in the round of 16 by a score of 2–1. The match proved controversial with members of the Italian team, most notably striker Francesco Totti and coach Giovanni Trapattoni, suggesting a conspiracy to eliminate Italy from the competition. Trapattoni even obliquely accused FIFA of ordering the official to ensure a Korean victory so that one of the two host nations would remain in the tournament. The most contentious decisions by the game referee Byron Moreno were an early penalty awarded to South Korea (saved by Buffon), a golden goal by Damiano Tommasi incorrectly ruled offside, and the sending off of Totti after being presented with a second yellow card for an alleged dive in the penalty area. FIFA president Sepp Blatter stated that the linesmen had been a "disaster" and admitted that Italy suffered from bad offside calls during the group matches, but he denied conspiracy allegations. While questioning Totti's sending off by Moreno, Blatter refused to blame Italy's loss entirely on the referees, stating: "Italy's elimination is not only down to referees and linesmen who made human not premeditated errors. Italy made mistakes both in defense and in attack."

Trapattoni stayed on and guided the team at Euro 2004 in Portugal, where after draws against Denmark and Sweden along with a victory over Bulgaria in Group C, Italy were eliminated following a three-way five point tie based on the number of goals scored in matches among the tied teams. Goalkeeper Gianluigi Buffon and then Italian football federation president Franco Carraro accused the Swedish and Danish teams of fixing the result of their final match (2-2 was the result which consented both teams to advance). Despite calls, then-UEFA spokesperson Robert Faulkner said the organization would not investigate the result.

=== 2006 World Cup victory ===
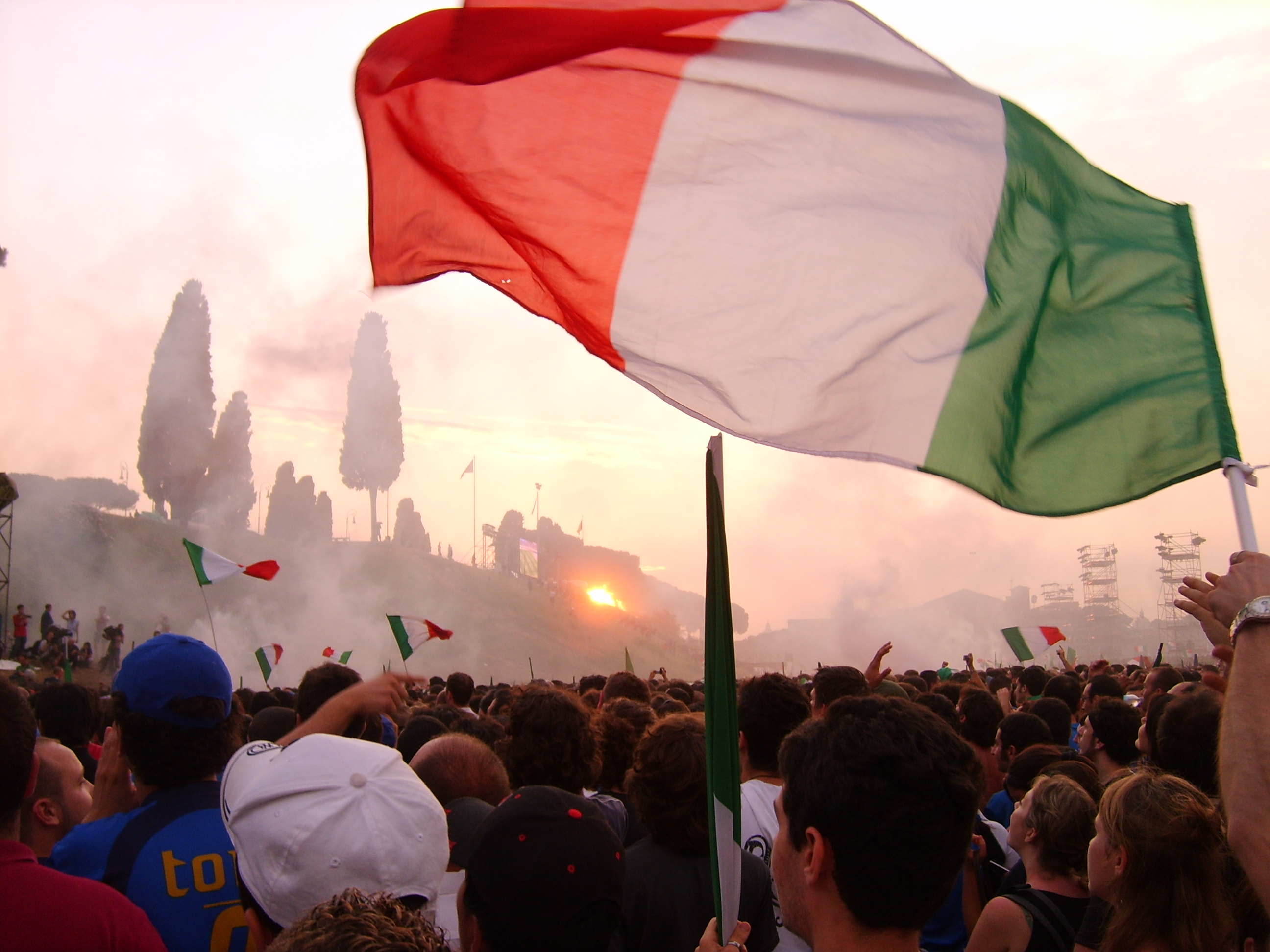
The crowd at Circus Maximus in Rome, after Italy scored against France

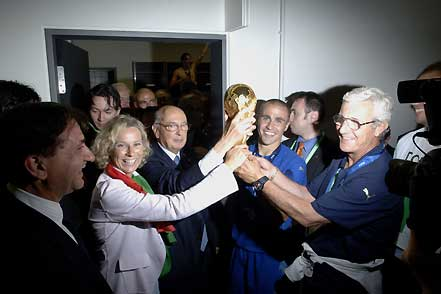
Italian President Giorgio Napolitano congratulates coach Lippi and captain Cannavaro after the final match against France.

The Italian Football Federation replaced Trapattoni with Marcello Lippi. With controversy plaguing the domestic league, Italy entered the 2006 World Cup as one of the eight seeded teams. Italy finished first in Group E with wins against Ghana and the Czech Republic and a draw with the United States. In the round of 16, Italy secured a 1–0 victory over Australia with Francesco Totti scoring a penalty. Italy overcame Ukraine, 3–0, after taking an early lead through Gianluca Zambrotta and additional goals coming from Luca Toni. In the semi-finals, Italy beat hosts Germany 2–0 with goals Fabio Grosso and Alessandro Del Piero in the last minutes of extra time.

On 9 July 2006, the Azzurri won their fourth World Cup title after defeating France in the final. French captain Zinedine Zidane opened the scoring from the penalty spot in the seventh minute before Marco Materazzi scored from a corner kick, twelve minutes later. The score remained level and during extra-time and Zidane was sent off for headbutting Materazzi. Italy went on to win the penalty shootout 5–3, with all Italian players scoring their kicks. The decisive penalty goal was scored by Grosso.

FIFA named seven Italian players — Gianluigi Buffon, Fabio Cannavaro, Gianluca Zambrotta, Andrea Pirlo, Gennaro Gattuso, Francesco Totti and Luca Toni — to the 23-man tournament All Star Team. Buffon also won the Lev Yashin Award, given to the best goalkeeper of the tournament; he conceded only two goals in the tournament's seven matches, the first an own goal by Zaccardo and the second from Zidane's penalty kick in the final, and remained unbeaten for 460 consecutive minutes. In honour of Italy winning a fourth World Cup, members of the squad were awarded the Italian Order of Merit of Cavaliere.

=== The decline of the world champions (2006–2010) ===
Marcello Lippi, who had announced his resignation three days after the World Cup triumph, was replaced by Roberto Donadoni. Italy qualified for Euro 2008 by winning their group ahead of France. On 14 February 2007, Italy climbed to first in the FIFA World Rankings for the second time. At Euro 2008, the Azzurri lost 3–0 to the Netherlands in the opening match of the group stage. The following game against Romania ended 1–1 thanks to a penalty save from Gianluigi Buffon. Italy would win their final group game against France 2–0, a rematch of the 2006 World Cup final. The Azzurri were eliminated in the quarter-finals on penalties to eventual champions Spain. Within a week of the game, Roberto Donadoni's contract was terminated and Marcello Lippi was rehired as coach.

Italy qualified for their first ever FIFA Confederations Cup held in South Africa in June 2009 by virtue of winning the 2006 World Cup. They won their opening match of the tournament against the United States, but subsequent defeats to Egypt and Brazil meant that they finished third in the group on goals scored (points level with the US and Egypt), and were eliminated.

At the 2010 World Cup in South Africa, reigning champions Italy were unexpectedly eliminated in the first round, finishing last place in their group. After being held to 1–1 draws with Paraguay and New Zealand needing equalizers in both games, they suffered a 3–2 loss to Slovakia having trailed 2-0 and 3-1. It was the first time Italy failed to win a single game at a World Cup tournament, and in doing so became only the third nation to be eliminated in the first round while being reigning World Cup champions. Marcello Lippi stepped down after Italy's World Cup campaign and was replaced by Cesare Prandelli, although Lippi's successor had already been announced before the tournament.

=== Euro 2012 runners-up and fluctuating results (2012–2018) ===
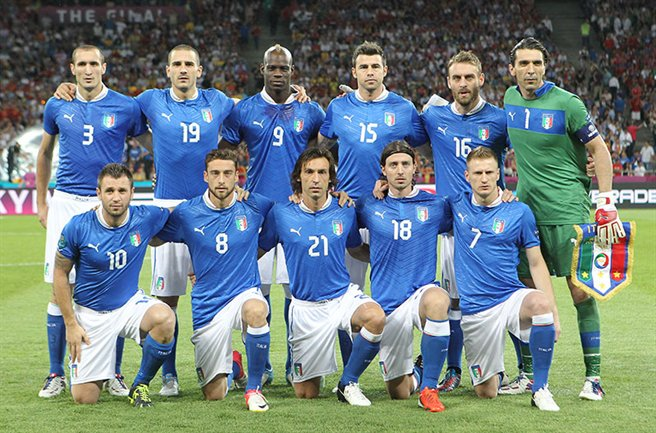
The national football team of Italy before the UEFA Euro 2012 final, Olympic Stadium, Kyiv, 1 July 2012

At UEFA Euro 2012, Italy finished second in their group behind Spain, which earned them a quarter-final tie against England. After a mostly one-sided affair in which Italy failed to take their chances, they managed to beat England on penalties. In the semi-final against Germany, two first-half goals by Mario Balotelli saw the Italians through to the final. In the final, Italy fell to a 4–0 defeat to Spain.

During the 2013 Confederations Cup in Brazil, Italy reached the semi-finals, losing 7–6 on penalties to Spain. Italy did manage to beat Uruguay in the third place play-off. At the 2014 FIFA World Cup, Italy defeated England 2–1 in their first match before succumbing to underdogs Costa Rica 1–0 in the second group stage match. In Italy's last group match, they were knocked out by Uruguay 1–0, in a controversial match, where Italian player Claudio Marchisio was controversially sent off whilst Uruguay's Luis Suárez bit Italy's Giorgio Chiellini without any sanction. Shortly after this loss, coach Cesare Prandelli resigned.

Former Juventus manager Antonio Conte was selected to replace Prandelli. On 10 October 2015, Italy qualified for Euro 2016, courtesy of a 3–1 win over Azerbaijan; the result meant that Italy had gone 50 games unbeaten in European qualifiers. On 4 April 2016, it was announced that Antonio Conte would step down as Italy coach after Euro 2016 to become head coach of Chelsea. The 23-man squad was initially criticised by many fans and members of the media for its lack of quality, which saw notable absences, such as Andrea Pirlo and Sebastian Giovinco being controversially left out. Italy opened Euro 2016 with a 2–0 victory over Belgium and qualified thanks to a win against Sweden in the second match, which made their defeat 1–0 to Ireland in the final group stage match irrelevant for access to the round of 16. Italy subsequently defeated reigning European champions Spain 2–0 in the round of 16. However, Italy were defeated by reigning world champions Germany in the quarter-finals on penalties, after a 1–1 draw.

==== Failure to qualify for 2018 World Cup ====
After Conte's planned departure following Euro 2016, Gian Piero Ventura took over as manager for the team. During qualification for the 2018 World Cup, Italy finished second in Group G, five points behind Spain. Italy would compete in the play-off round against Sweden, where they lost 1–0 on aggregate and therefore eliminated; the first time that Italy had failed to qualify for the World Cup since 1958. Following the match, veterans Andrea Barzagli, Daniele De Rossi and captain Gianluigi Buffon all declared their retirement from the national team. On 15 November 2017, Ventura was dismissed as head coach, and on 20 November 2017, Carlo Tavecchio resigned as president of the Italian Football Federation. Luigi Di Biagio was called as caretaker manager and led the team in subsequent friendlies in March 2018, including the last of Buffon's 176 appearances in a friendly against Argentina.

=== Resurgence and second European title (2018–2021) ===
On 14 May 2018, Roberto Mancini was announced as the new manager. On 16 August 2018, in the first FIFA World Rankings update that followed the World Cup, Italy dropped to their lowest-ever ranking of 21st. On 18 November 2019, Italy finished Euro 2020 qualifying with ten wins in all ten matches, becoming only the sixth side to qualify for a European Championship with a perfect record. On 17 March 2020, UEFA confirmed that Euro 2020 would be postponed by one year due to the COVID-19 pandemic.

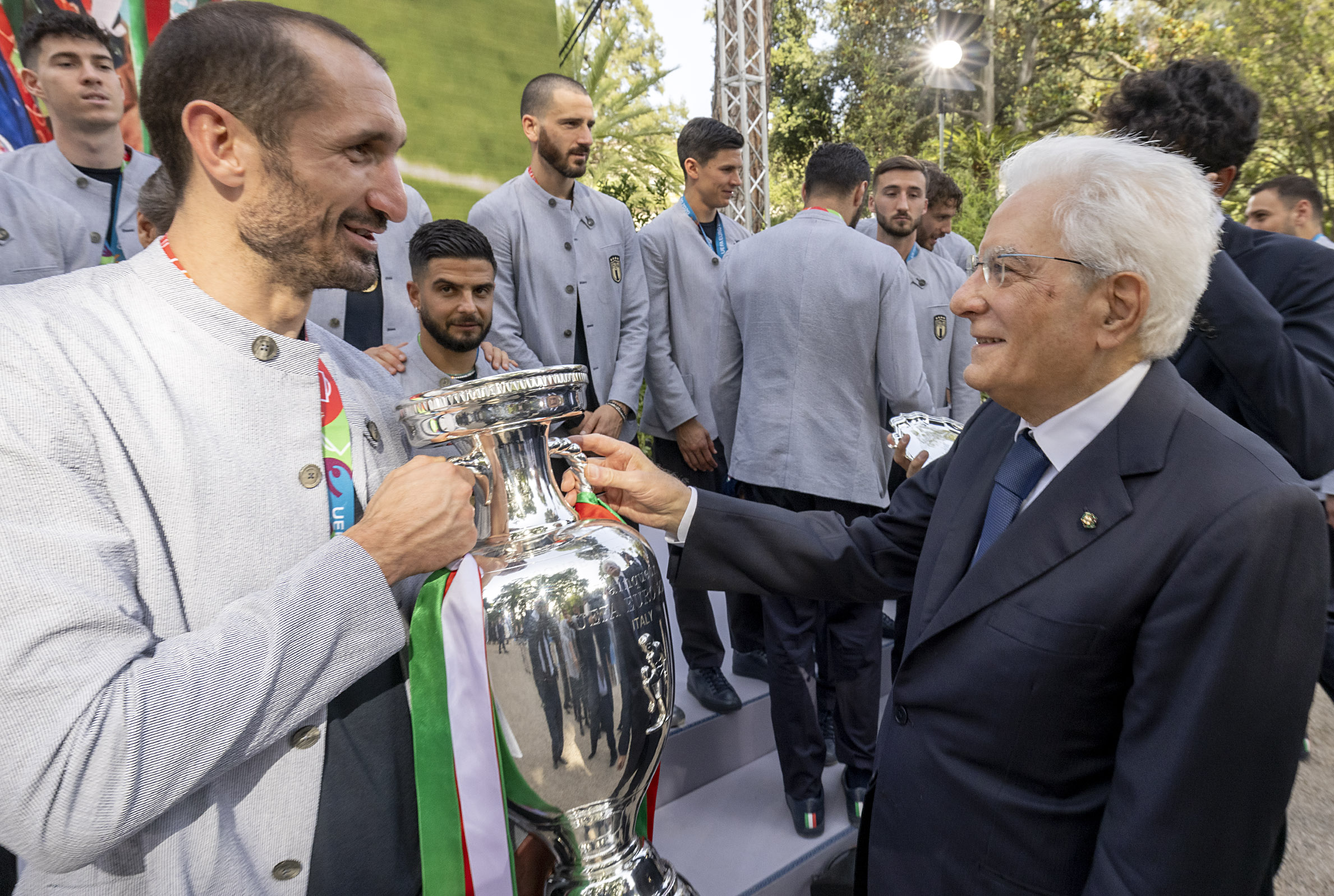
President of Italy Sergio Mattarella (right) congratulates captain Chiellini in Rome, the day after Italy's triumph at UEFA Euro 2020

At the delayed Euro 2020, Italy finished top of Group A, ahead of Turkey, Switzerland, and Wales. Being one of the host nations, Italy played all three group games at Rome's Stadio Olimpico, and it became the first team in European Championship history to win each group stage match without conceding. In the round of 16, Italy defeated Austria 2–1 at Wembley Stadium after extra time. In the quarter-finals, Italy secured a 2–1 victory over Belgium, before beating Spain on penalties in the semi-finals.

In the final, on 11 July 2021, Italy won the European Championship defeating hosts England at Wembley Stadium on penalties after a 1–1 draw, for their second European title and their first since 1968. Goalkeeper Gianluigi Donnarumma also won the Player of the Tournament award, given to the best player of the tournament. On 16 July, all members of the European Championship-winning squad were awarded the Italian Order of Merit of Cavaliere.

In October 2021, Italy participated in the UEFA Nations League Finals as hosts, and lost the semi-final against Spain, 2–1 at the San Siro. This match meant the end of the record 37-game unbeaten run and the first defeat for Italy in more than three years. Four days later, Italy won the third-place play-off, 2–1 against Belgium.

=== Italian football crisis (2022–present) ===
==== Failure to qualify for 2022 World Cup and disappointment at Euro 2024 ====
On 15 November 2021, Italy drew 0–0 with Northern Ireland in their final 2022 World Cup qualifying match and finished in second place, two points behind Switzerland. On 24 March 2022, Italy lost 1–0 in the semi-final of the play-offs against North Macedonia, their first-ever World Cup qualifying home defeat, therefore, failing to qualify for the World Cup for a second consecutive time.

On 1 June 2022, Italy took part in the CONMEBOL–UEFA Cup of Champions match, rebranded as the 2022 Finalissima, losing 3–0 against defending Copa América champion Argentina. In September, Italy qualified for the 2023 UEFA Nations League Finals after beating Hungary 2–0 in Budapest. On 15 June 2023, Italy played the semi-final against Spain, losing 2–1. Three days later, Italy won the third-place match 3–2 against the Netherlands.

In August 2023, after five years as Italy's coach, Mancini resigned. Luciano Spalletti was chosen as the new coach, and led the team in the last six games of Euro 2024 qualifying, managing to achieve direct qualification to the European Championship. Italy were eliminated from the tournament in the round of 16 following a 2–0 loss to Switzerland, leading the minister for Sport Andrea Abodi to call the Euro campaign a "failure".

==== Failure to qualify for 2026 World Cup ====
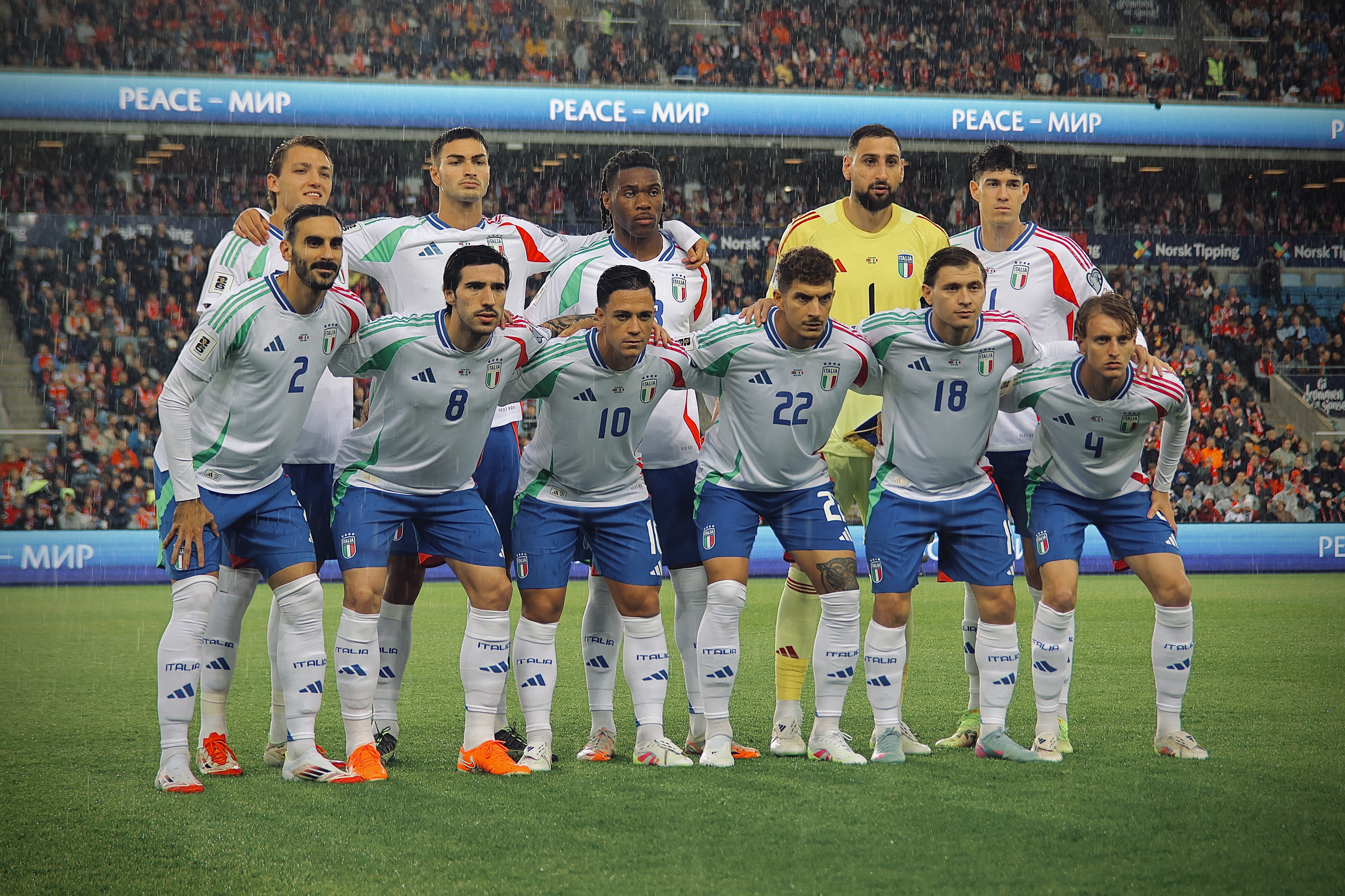
Italy's starting lineup against Norway in 2025

In June 2025, after a 3–0 defeat against Norway in the first match of the 2026 FIFA World Cup qualifiers in Oslo, Spalletti was relieved from his duties, and former World Cup champion Gennaro Gattuso took his place. Gattuso's debut as Italy's commissario tecnico came on 5 September in a 5–0 win against Estonia. In November of the same year, Italy qualified for the play-offs for the third time in a row following a 4–1 home defeat to Norway. Italy defeated Northern Ireland 2–0 in the semi-final, but on 31 March 2026, Italy failed to qualify for the World Cup after losing away to Bosnia and Herzegovina on penalties following a 1–1 draw, marking the third straight World Cup for which they failed to qualify. Two days later, Gabriele Gravina resigned as President of the Italian Federation, and Buffon and Gattuso resigned as head of delegation and head coach, respectively.

On 10 April, Italy U21 coach Silvio Baldini was named caretaker manager for Italy's friendlies in June, both won despite having called up only Under-21 players with the exception of captain Donnarumma. On 28 July, newly elected FIGC president Giovanni Malagò announced Roberto Mancini’s return as head coach of the national team and that Claudio Ranieri would take on the role of technical director of the Italian Federation.

== Rivalries ==
- Italy vs. Brazil: matches between the nations are known as the World Derby (Portuguese: Clássico Mundial). The most successful football nations in the world, they have achieved nine World Cups between one another. Since their first match at the 1938 World Cup, they have played against each other a total of five times in the World Cup, most notably in the 1970 World Cup final and the 1994 World Cup final in which Brazil won 4–1 and 3–2 on penalties after a goalless draw respectively.
- Italy vs. France: matches between the two nations officially began on 15 May 1910, Italy's first recorded match ending in a 6–2 victory. Notable matches in the World Cup and the European Football Championship include the 2006 World Cup final, when the Italians defeated the French 5–3 in the penalty shoot-out, after a 1–1 draw, and the 2000 European Championship, won by France with an extra-time golden goal by David Trezeguet.
- Italy vs. Germany: matches between the two nations have cumulated in five matches in the World Cup, including the "Game of the Century", the 1970 World Cup semifinal between the two countries that Italy won 4–3 in extra time, with five of the seven goals coming in extra time. Italy defeated West Germany 3–1 in the 1982 FIFA World Cup final. Germany has also won three European Championships while Italy has won it twice. The two countries have faced each other four times in the European Championship, with three draws (one German penalty shoot-out victory) and one Italian victory. Germany had never defeated Italy in a major tournament match until their victory in the Euro 2016 quarterfinals, on penalties (though statistically considered a draw), with all Germany's other wins over Italy being in friendly competitions.
- Italy vs. Spain: this is a less heated and less heartfelt rivalry for the Italians, especially when compared to those with Germany and France. Matches between Italy and Spain are known as the Mediterranean Derby (Spanish: Rivalidad futbolística Italia-España), named after the Mediterranean Sea that separates the two nations. Matches between them have been contested since 1920, and although they are not immediate geographical neighbours, their rivalry at international level is enhanced by the strong performances of their representative clubs in UEFA competitions. Since the quarterfinal match between them at Euro 2008 (won by Spain in the penalty shoot-out), the rivalry has renewed, as Italy and Spain played against each other also in the UEFA Euro 2012 final (which Spain won 4–0) in the Round of 16 of UEFA Euro 2016 (which Italy won 2-0) and in the UEFA Euro 2020 semifinal (won by Italy in the penalty shoot-out).
- Italy vs. England: this rivalry has been renewed in recent times. Italy and England played against each other at UEFA Euro 1980, at the 1990 World Cup, in the quarter-finals of UEFA Euro 2012, at the 2014 World Cup and most notably in the Euro 2020 final.

== Team image ==
=== Kits and crest ===
Media related to national team kits and goalkeeper kits at Wikimedia Commons

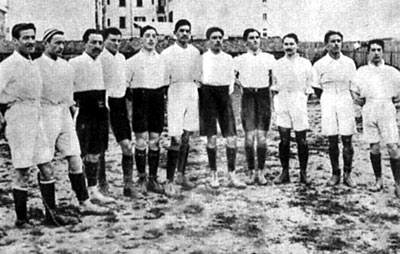
Italy in 1910, wearing the original white jersey. They would switch to the traditional blue shirt a year later.

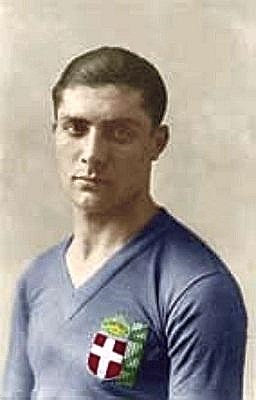
The blue shirt had a House of Savoy badge during the early 1930s.

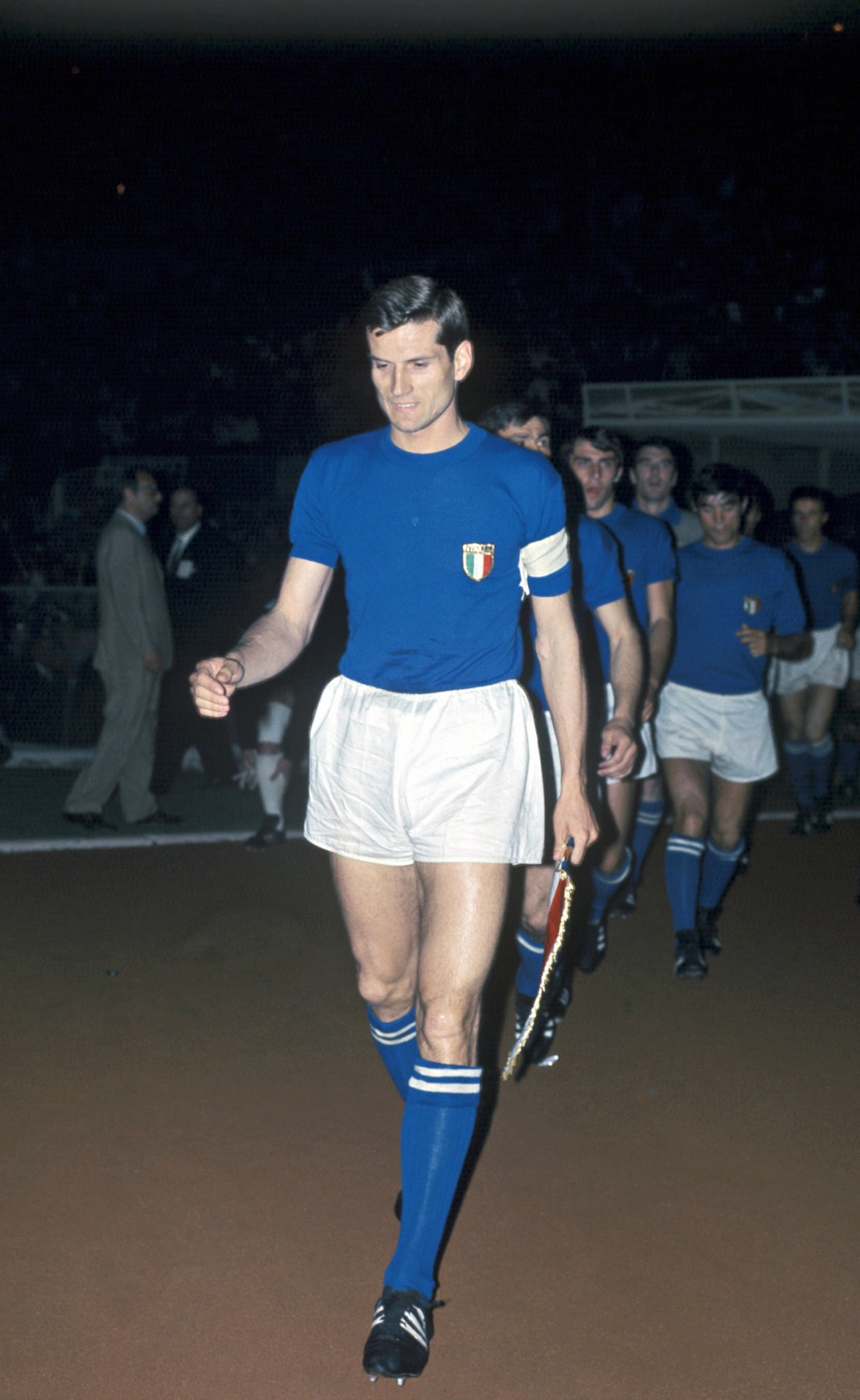
Italy's classic kit, worn by Giacinto Facchetti in 1968

The first shirt worn by the Italy national team, in its debut against France on 15 May 1910, was white. The choice of colour was due to the fact that a decision about the appearance of the kit had not yet been made, so it was decided not to have a colour, which was why white was chosen. After two games, for a friendly against Hungary in Milan on 6 January 1911, the white shirt was replaced by a blue jersey (specifically Savoy azure)—blue being the border colour of the royal House of Savoy crest used on the flag of the Kingdom of Italy (1861–1946); the shirt was accompanied by white shorts and black socks (which later became blue). The team later became known as gli Azzurri (the Blues).

In the 1930s, Italy wore a black kit, ordered by the fascist regime of Benito Mussolini. The black kit debuted on 17 February 1935 in a friendly against France at the Stadio Nazionale PNF in Rome. A blue shirt, white shorts and black socks were worn at the 1936 Olympic Games in Berlin the following year. At the 1938 FIFA World Cup in France, the all-black kit was worn once in the match against France.

After World War II, the fascist regime fell and the monarchy was abolished in 1946. The same year saw the birth of the Italian Republic, and the blue-and-white kit was reinstated. The cross of the former Royal House of Savoy was removed from the flag of Italy, and consequently from the national team's badge, now consisting solely of the Tricolore. For the 1954 FIFA World Cup, the country's name in Italian, ITALIA, was placed above the tricolour shield, and for the 1982 World Cup, FIGC, the abbreviation of the Italian Football Federation, was incorporated into the badge.

In 1983, to celebrate the previous year's World Cup win, three gold stars replaced ITALIA above the tricolour, representing their three World Cup victories. In 1984, a round emblem was launched, featuring the three stars, the inscriptions ITALIA and FIGC, and the tricolour.

The first known kit manufacturer was Adidas in 1974. From 2003 to 2022, the kit was made by Puma. Since the 2000s, an all-blue uniform including blue shorts has occasionally been used, particularity in international tournaments. After Italy's 2006 World Cup victory, a fourth star was added to the tricolour badge. In March 2022, after almost 20 years with Puma, it was announced that Adidas will be Italy's kit manufacturer from 2023 as part of a four-year deal.

Kit supplier	Period
(West Germany) Adidas	1974–1977
(Italy) Baila	1978–1979
(France) Le Coq Sportif	1980–1984
(Italy) Ennerre	1985
(Italy) Diadora	1986–1994
(United States) Nike	1995–1998
(Italy) Kappa	1999–2002
(Germany) Puma	2003–2022
(Germany) Adidas	2023–present

== Coaching staff ==
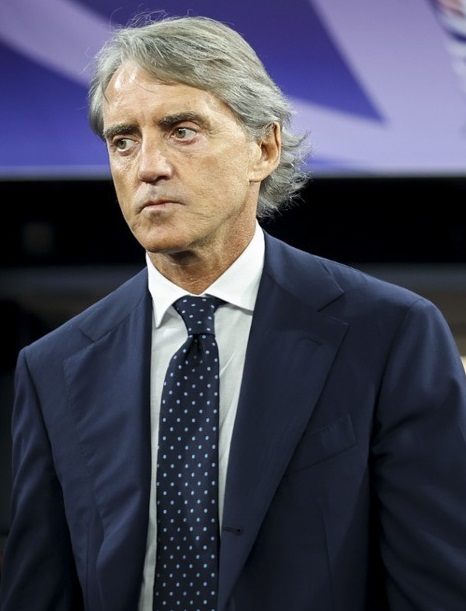
Roberto Mancini (2024) has been head coach of the Italy national team since 2026. He previously served from 2018 to 2023.

During the earliest days of Italian nation football, it was common for a Technical Commission to be appointed. The Commission took the role that a standard coach would currently play. Ever since 1967, the national team has been controlled only by the coach. For this reason, the coach of the Italy national team is still called Technical Commissioner (Italian: commissario tecnico) or CT. The use of this title has since then expanded into other team sports in Italy.

Position	Staff
Head coach	(Italy) Roberto Mancini
Assistant coach	(Italy) Alberto Bollini
Technical assistant	(Italy) Leonardo Bonucci (Italy) Antonio Gagliardi (Italy) Massimo Maccarone
Team manager	(Italy) Gabriele Oriali
Goalkeeping coach	(Italy) Marco Roccati
Assistant goalkeeping coach	(Italy) Cristiano Lupatelli
Fitness coach	(Italy) Giacomo Ceci (Italy) Marco Montini
Match analyst	(Italy) Renato Baldi (Italy) Christian Venturini

Last updated: 7 August 2026

== Results and fixtures ==
The following is a list of match results in the last twelve months, as well as any future matches that have been scheduled.

Win Draw Loss Fixture

=== 2026 ===
26 March 2026 2026 FIFA World Cup qualification play-offs	Italy	2–0	Northern Ireland	Bergamo, Italy
20:45 CET (UTC+01:00)	Tonali 56'; Kean 80'	Report		Stadium: Stadio Atleti Azzurri d'Italia; Attendance: 23,439; Referee: Danny Makkelie (Netherlands)

31 March 2026 2026 FIFA World Cup qualification play-offs	Bosnia and Herzegovina	1–1 (a.e.t.) (4–1 p)	Italy	Zenica, Bosnia and Herzegovina
20:45 CEST (UTC+02:00)	Tabaković 79'	Report	Kean 15'	Stadium: Stadion Bilino Polje; Attendance: 9,500; Referee: Clément Turpin (France)
	Penalties
	Tahirović (penalty scored); Tabaković (penalty scored); Alajbegović (penalty scored); Bajraktarević (penalty scored)		(penalty missed) P. Esposito; (penalty scored) Tonali; (penalty missed) Cristante

3 June 2026 Friendly	Luxembourg	0–1	Italy	Luxembourg City, Luxembourg
20:45 CEST (UTC+02:00)		Report	P. Esposito 49'	Stadium: Stade de Luxembourg; Attendance: 9,214; Referee: Joey Kooij (Netherlands)

7 June 2026 Friendly	Greece	0–1	Italy	Heraklion, Greece
21:00 CEST (UTC+02:00)		Report	P. Esposito 18'	Stadium: Pankritio Stadium; Attendance: 13,000; Referee: Yigal Frid (Israel)

25 September 2026 2026–27 UEFA Nations League	Italy	0–2	Belgium	Rome, Italy
20:45 CEST (UTC+02:00)		Report	Godts 20'; Lukébakio 69'	Stadium: Stadio Olimpico; Attendance: 47,155; Referee: Daniel Siebert (Germany)

28 September 2026 2026–27 UEFA Nations League	Turkey	1–4	Italy	Bursa, Turkey
20:45 CEST (UTC+02:00)	Yılmaz 47'	Report	Bastoni 9'; Frattesi 22'; Kayode 27'; P. Esposito 50'	Stadium: Centennial Atatürk Stadium; Attendance: 33,891; Referee: Michael Oliver (England)

2 October 2026 2026–27 UEFA Nations League	France	1–1	Italy	Saint-Denis, France
20:45 CEST (UTC+02:00)	Olise 55'	Report	Bastoni 68'	Stadium: Stade de France; Attendance: 77,118; Referee: Jesús Gil Manzano (Spain)

5 October 2026 2026–27 UEFA Nations League	Italy	3–1	Turkey	Bologna, Italy
20:45 CEST (UTC+02:00)	Scamacca 26'; Calafiori 65'; P. Esposito 87'	Report	Şimşir 61'	Stadium: Stadio Renato Dall'Ara; Attendance: 30,040; Referee: Szymon Marciniak (Poland)

12 November 2026 2026–27 UEFA Nations League	Italy	3–1	France	Milan, Italy
20:45 CET (UTC+01:00)	P. Esposito 26', 75' (pen.); Frattesi 63'	Report	Olise 10'	Stadium: San Siro; Attendance: 71,452; Referee: István Kovács (Romania)

15 November 2026 2026–27 UEFA Nations League	Belgium	4–1	Italy	Brussels, Belgium
20:45 CET (UTC+01:00)	De Cuyper 15'; Ngoy 22'; Doku 26'; Moreira 80'	Report	P. Esposito 11'	Stadium: King Baudouin Stadium; Attendance: 41,842; Referee: Espen Eskås (Norway)

== Players ==
=== Current squad ===
The following players were called up for the 2026–27 UEFA Nations League matches against France and Belgium on 12 and 15 November 2026, respectively.

Information correct as of 15 November 2026, after the match against Belgium.

No.	Pos.	Player	Date of birth (age)	Caps	Goals	Club
1	GK	Gianluigi Donnarumma (captain)	25 February 1999 (age 27)	89	0	(The Football Association) Manchester City
12	GK	Marco Carnesecchi	1 July 2000 (age 26)	0	0	(Italian Football Federation) Atalanta
13	GK	Guglielmo Vicario	7 October 1996 (age 30)	5	0	(Italian Football Federation) Juventus
2	DF	Michael Kayode	10 July 2004 (age 22)	5	1	(The Football Association) Brentford
3	DF	Giorgio Scalvini	11 December 2003 (age 22)	13	0	(Italian Football Federation) Atalanta
4	DF	Honest Ahanor	23 February 2008 (age 18)	2	0	(The Football Association) Crystal Palace
5	DF	Riccardo Calafiori	19 May 2002 (age 24)	19	1	(The Football Association) Arsenal
6	DF	Alessandro Bastoni	13 April 1999 (age 27)	48	5	(Italian Football Federation) Inter Milan
11	DF	Federico Dimarco	10 November 1997 (age 29)	40	3	(Italian Football Federation) Inter Milan
14	DF	Marco Palestra	3 March 2005 (age 21)	3	0	(The Football Association) Chelsea
22	DF	Daniele Ghilardi	6 January 2003 (age 23)	0	0	(Italian Football Federation) Roma
	DF	Federico Gatti	24 June 1998 (age 28)	8	0	(Italian Football Federation) Juventus
	DF	Matteo Palma	13 March 2008 (age 18)	0	0	(Italian Football Federation) Udinese
8	MF	Sandro Tonali	8 May 2000 (age 26)	38	4	(The Football Association) Tottenham Hotspur
10	MF	Nicolò Fagioli	12 February 2001 (age 25)	10	0	(Italian Football Federation) Fiorentina
15	MF	Issa Doumbia	16 October 2003 (age 23)	6	0	(Portuguese Football Federation) Sporting CP
16	MF	Niccolò Pisilli	23 September 2004 (age 22)	5	0	(Italian Football Federation) Roma
17	MF	Alessandro Romano	17 June 2006 (age 20)	3	0	(Italian Football Federation) Cagliari
18	MF	Nicolò Barella	7 February 1997 (age 29)	75	10	(Italian Football Federation) Inter Milan
	MF	Samuele Ricci	21 August 2001 (age 25)	12	0	(Italian Football Federation) Como
7	FW	Alphadjo Cisse	22 October 2006 (age 20)	1	0	(Italian Football Federation) AC Milan
9	FW	Pio Esposito	28 June 2005 (age 21)	15	10	(Italian Football Federation) Inter Milan
19	FW	Mattia Liberali	6 April 2007 (age 19)	0	0	(Italian Football Federation) Como
20	FW	Gianluca Scamacca	1 January 1999 (age 27)	26	2	(Italian Football Federation) Atalanta
21	FW	Antonio Vergara	16 January 2003 (age 23)	4	0	(Italian Football Federation) Napoli
23	FW	Luca Koleosho	15 September 2004 (age 22)	3	0	(French Football Federation) Paris FC
	FW	Sebastiano Esposito	2 July 2002 (age 24)	3	0	(Italian Football Federation) Sassuolo

=== Recent call-ups ===
The following players have been called up to the national team in the past 12 months but are not part of the current squad.

Pos.	Player	Date of birth (age)	Caps	Goals	Club	Latest call-up
GK	Massimo Pessina	25 December 2007 (age 18)	0	0	(Italy) Bologna	v. Turkey, 5 October 2026
GK	Giovanni Daffara	5 December 2004 (age 21)	0	0	(Italy) Parma	v. Greece, 7 June 2026
GK	Lorenzo Palmisani	12 June 2004 (age 22)	0	0	(Italy) Frosinone	v. Greece, 7 June 2026
GK	Alex Meret	22 March 1997 (age 29)	3	0	(Italy) Napoli	v. Bosnia and Herzegovina, 31 March 2026
GK	Elia Caprile	25 August 2001 (age 25)	0	0	(Italy) Cagliari	v. Bosnia and Herzegovina, 31 March 2026
DF	Gianluca Mancini	17 April 1996 (age 30)	22	2	(Italy) Roma	v. France, 12 November 2026 ^{INJ}
DF	Giovanni Di Lorenzo	4 August 1993 (age 33)	56	5	(Italy) Napoli	v. Turkey, 5 October 2026
DF	Diego Coppola	28 December 2003 (age 22)	3	0	(France) Paris FC	v. Turkey, 5 October 2026
DF	Matteo Ruggeri	11 July 2002 (age 24)	2	0	(England) Aston Villa	v. Turkey, 5 October 2026
DF	Eddy Kouadio	7 May 2006 (age 20)	0	0	(Italy) Monza	v. Turkey, 5 October 2026
DF	Davide Bartesaghi	29 December 2005 (age 20)	2	0	(Italy) AC Milan	v. Greece, 7 June 2026
DF	Fabio Chiarodia	5 June 2005 (age 21)	2	0	(Germany) Borussia Mönchengladbach	v. Greece, 7 June 2026
DF	Pietro Comuzzo	20 February 2005 (age 21)	2	0	(Italy) Torino	v. Greece, 7 June 2026
DF	Costantino Favasuli	26 April 2004 (age 22)	2	0	(Italy) Napoli	v. Greece, 7 June 2026
DF	Filippo Mane	8 March 2005 (age 21)	2	0	(Germany) Borussia Dortmund	v. Greece, 7 June 2026
DF	Niccolò Fortini	13 February 2006 (age 20)	1	0	(Italy) Torino	v. Greece, 7 June 2026
DF	Luca Reggiani	9 January 2008 (age 18)	1	0	(Germany) Borussia Dortmund	v. Greece, 7 June 2026
DF	Leonardo Spinazzola	25 March 1993 (age 33)	27	0	(Italy) Napoli	v. Bosnia and Herzegovina, 31 March 2026
DF	Andrea Cambiaso	20 February 2000 (age 26)	19	3	(Italy) Juventus	v. Bosnia and Herzegovina, 31 March 2026
DF	Alessandro Buongiorno	6 June 1999 (age 27)	12	0	(Italy) Napoli	v. Bosnia and Herzegovina, 31 March 2026
MF	Davide Frattesi	22 September 1999 (age 27)	39	10	(Italy) Lazio	v. Belgium, 15 November 2026 ^{INJ}
MF	Riccardo Cassano	18 March 2009 (age 17)	0	0	(Italy) Como	v. France, 12 November 2026 ^{PRE}
MF	Rolando Mandragora	29 June 1997 (age 29)	1	0	(Italy) Torino	v. Turkey, 5 October 2026
MF	Bryan Cristante	3 March 1995 (age 31)	48	2	(Italy) Roma	v. Belgium, 25 September 2026 ^{INJ}
MF	Matteo Dagasso	1 April 2004 (age 22)	2	0	(Italy) Venezia	v. Greece, 7 June 2026
MF	Luca Lipani	18 May 2005 (age 21)	2	0	(Italy) Sassuolo	v. Greece, 7 June 2026
MF	Cher Ndour	27 July 2004 (age 22)	2	0	(Italy) Fiorentina	v. Greece, 7 June 2026
MF	Giacomo Faticanti	31 July 2004 (age 22)	1	0	(Italy) Avellino	v. Greece, 7 June 2026
MF	Tommaso Berti	7 March 2004 (age 22)	0	0	(Italy) Cremonese	v. Greece, 7 June 2026
MF	Lorenzo Venturino	22 June 2006 (age 20)	0	0	(Italy) Genoa	v. Luxembourg, 3 June 2026 ^{INJ}
MF	Manuel Locatelli	8 January 1998 (age 28)	36	3	(Italy) Juventus	v. Bosnia and Herzegovina, 31 March 2026
FW	Nicolò Cambiaghi	28 December 2000 (age 25)	4	0	(Italy) Bologna	v. Belgium, 15 November 2026 ^{INJ}
FW	Nicolò Zaniolo	2 July 1999 (age 27)	19	2	(Italy) Udinese	v. France, 12 November 2026 ^{PRE}
FW	Simone Lontani	18 January 2008 (age 18)	0	0	(Italy) Parma	v. France, 12 November 2026 ^{PRE}
FW	Moise Kean	28 February 2000 (age 26)	28	13	(Italy) Como	v. Turkey, 5 October 2026 ^{INJ}
FW	Daniel Maldini	11 October 2001 (age 25)	9	0	(Italy) Cagliari	v. Turkey, 5 October 2026
FW	Samuele Inácio	2 April 2008 (age 18)	1	0	(Germany) Borussia Dortmund	v. Turkey, 5 October 2026
FW	Mohamed Alì Zoma	16 December 2003 (age 22)	1	0	(Germany) 1. FC Nürnberg	v. Turkey, 5 October 2026
FW	Giacomo Raspadori	18 February 2000 (age 26)	47	11	(Italy) Atalanta	v. Turkey, 28 September 2026 ^{INJ}
FW	Francesco Camarda	10 March 2008 (age 18)	2	0	(Italy) AC Milan	v. Greece, 7 June 2026
FW	Seydou Fini	2 June 2006 (age 20)	2	0	(Italy) Frosinone	v. Greece, 7 June 2026
FW	Jeff Ekhator	11 November 2006 (age 20)	1	0	(Italy) Juventus	v. Greece, 7 June 2026
FW	Alessio Cacciamani	29 June 2007 (age 19)	0	0	(Italy) Torino	v. Greece, 7 June 2026
FW	Luigi Cherubini	15 January 2004 (age 22)	1	0	(Italy) Benevento	v. Luxembourg, 3 June 2026 ^{INJ}
FW	Mateo Retegui	29 April 1999 (age 27)	28	11	(Saudi Arabia) Al-Qadsiah	v. Bosnia and Herzegovina, 31 March 2026
FW	Matteo Politano	3 August 1993 (age 33)	20	4	(Italy) Napoli	v. Bosnia and Herzegovina, 31 March 2026
FW	Federico Chiesa	25 October 1997 (age 29)	51	7	(England) Liverpool	v. Northern Ireland, 26 March 2026 ^{INJ}
^{INJ} Withdrew due to injury; ^{PRE} Preliminary squad

=== Previous squads ===
FIFA World Cup

- 1934 FIFA World Cup squad
- 1938 FIFA World Cup squad
- 1950 FIFA World Cup squad
- 1954 FIFA World Cup squad
- 1962 FIFA World Cup squad
- 1966 FIFA World Cup squad
- 1970 FIFA World Cup squad
- 1974 FIFA World Cup squad
- 1978 FIFA World Cup squad
- 1982 FIFA World Cup squad
- 1986 FIFA World Cup squad
- 1990 FIFA World Cup squad
- 1994 FIFA World Cup squad
- 1998 FIFA World Cup squad
- 2002 FIFA World Cup squad
- 2006 FIFA World Cup squad
- 2010 FIFA World Cup squad
- 2014 FIFA World Cup squad

UEFA European Championship

- UEFA Euro 1968 squad
- UEFA Euro 1980 squad
- UEFA Euro 1988 squad
- UEFA Euro 1996 squad
- UEFA Euro 2000 squad
- UEFA Euro 2004 squad
- UEFA Euro 2008 squad
- UEFA Euro 2012 squad
- UEFA Euro 2016 squad
- UEFA Euro 2020 squad
- UEFA Euro 2024 squad

FIFA Confederations Cup

- 2009 FIFA Confederations Cup squad
- 2013 FIFA Confederations Cup squad

UEFA Nations League Finals

- 2021 UEFA Nations League Finals squad
- 2023 UEFA Nations League Finals squad

Finalissima

- 2022 Finalissima squad

== Individual records ==
=== Player records ===
As of 15 November 2026

==== Most appearances ====
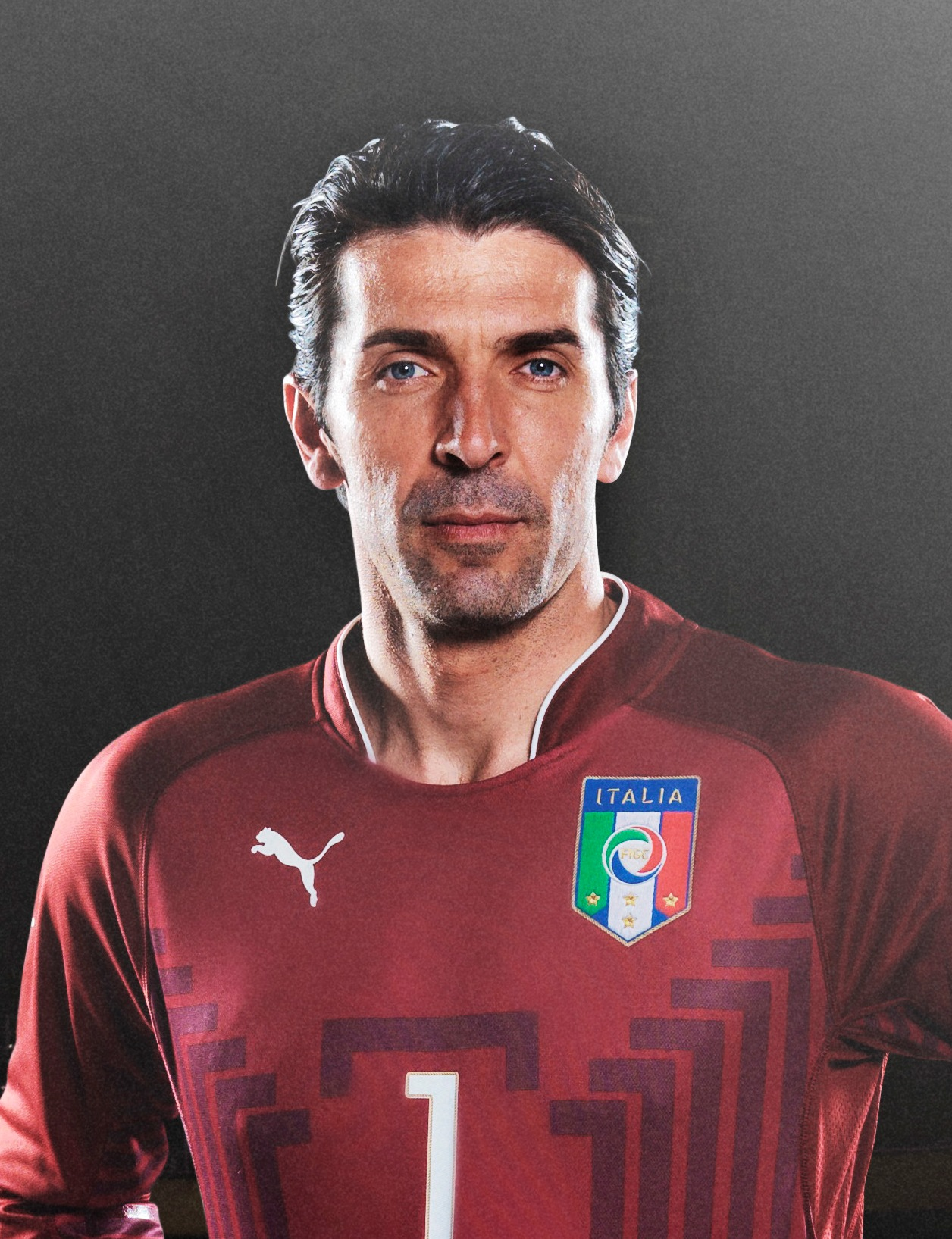
Gianluigi Buffon is the most capped player in the history of Italy with 176 caps.

Rank	Player	Caps	Goals	Period
1	Gianluigi Buffon	176	0	1997–2018
2	Fabio Cannavaro	136	2	1997–2010
3	Paolo Maldini	126	7	1988–2002
4	Leonardo Bonucci	121	8	2010–2023
5	Giorgio Chiellini	117	8	2004–2022
5	Daniele De Rossi	117	21	2004–2017
7	Andrea Pirlo	116	13	2002–2015
8	Dino Zoff	112	0	1968–1983
9	Gianluca Zambrotta	98	2	1999–2010
10	Giacinto Facchetti	94	3	1963–1977

==== Top goalscorers ====
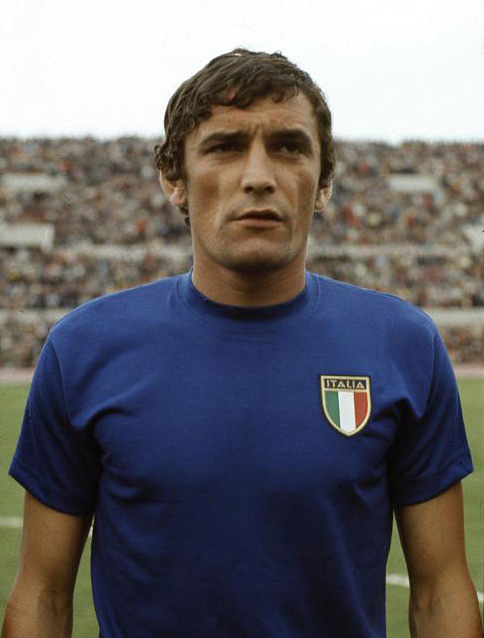
Gigi Riva is the top scorer in the history of Italy with 35 goals.

Rank	Player	Goals	Caps	Ratio	Period
1	Gigi Riva (list)	35	42	0.83	1965–1974
2	Giuseppe Meazza	33	53	0.62	1930–1939
3	Silvio Piola	30	34	0.88	1935–1952
4	Roberto Baggio	27	56	0.48	1988–2004
4	Alessandro Del Piero	27	91	0.3	1995–2008
6	Adolfo Baloncieri	25	47	0.53	1920–1930
6	Filippo Inzaghi	25	57	0.44	1997–2007
6	Alessandro Altobelli	25	61	0.41	1980–1988
9	Christian Vieri	23	49	0.47	1997–2005
9	Francesco Graziani	23	64	0.36	1975–1983

==== Captains ====
List of captaincy periods of the various captains throughout the years.

- 1910: Francesco Calì
- 1911–1914: Giuseppe Milano
- 1914–1915: Virgilio Fossati
- 1920–1925: Renzo De Vecchi
- 1925–1927: Luigi Cevenini
- 1927–1930: Adolfo Baloncieri
- 1931–1934: Umberto Caligaris
- 1934: Gianpiero Combi
- 1935–1936: Luigi Allemandi
- 1937–1939: Giuseppe Meazza
- 1940–1947: Silvio Piola
- 1947–1949: Valentino Mazzola
- 1949–1950: Riccardo Carapellese
- 1951–1952: Carlo Annovazzi
- 1952–1960: Giampiero Boniperti
- 1961–1962: Lorenzo Buffon
- 1962–1963: Cesare Maldini
- 1963–1966: Sandro Salvadore
- 1966–1977: Giacinto Facchetti
- 1977–1983: Dino Zoff
- 1983–1985: Marco Tardelli
- 1985–1986: Gaetano Scirea
- 1986–1987: Antonio Cabrini
- 1988–1991: Giuseppe Bergomi
- 1991–1994: Franco Baresi
- 1994–2002: Paolo Maldini
- 2002–2010: Fabio Cannavaro (Note: During UEFA Euro 2008, Alessandro Del Piero was named the Italy national team acting captain, as Cannavaro was injured and unable to take part in the competition, however Gianluigi Buffon was often played as captain as Del Piero was frequently deployed as a substitute.)
- 2010–2018: Gianluigi Buffon (Note: Gianluigi Buffon served as second acting captain in UEFA Euro 2008 after Alessandro Del Piero was named the team's acting captain, as Cannavaro was injured and unable to take part in the competition, however Del Piero was frequently deployed as a substitute. Although Buffon was officially named Italy's new captain in 2010, following Fabio Cannavaro's retirement subsequent to the 2010 FIFA World Cup, Andrea Pirlo was named the Italy national team's acting captain after the tournament (while Daniele De Rossi was named the team's second acting captain), as Buffon was ruled out until the end of the year due to injury, and only made his first appearance as Italy's official captain on 9 February 2011, in a 1–1 friendly away draw against Germany.)
- 2018–2022: Giorgio Chiellini
- 2022–2023: Leonardo Bonucci
- 2023: Ciro Immobile
- 2024–present: Gianluigi Donnarumma

=== Manager records ===
Most manager appearances
Enzo Bearzot: 104

== Team records ==
Largest victory
9–0 vs. United States, 2 August 1948
Largest defeat
1–7 vs. Hungary, 6 April 1924

== Competitive record ==
Champions Runners-up Third place Hosts

=== FIFA World Cup ===
FIFA World Cup record									Qualification record					
Year	Round	Position	Pld	W	D*	L	GF	GA	Pld	W	D	L	GF	GA
(Uruguay) 1930	Did not enter								Did not enter					
(Italy) 1934	Champions	1st	5	4	1	0	12	3	1	1	0	0	4	0
(France) 1938	Champions	1st	4	4	0	0	11	5	Qualified as defending champions					
(Brazil) 1950	Group stage	7th	2	1	0	1	4	3	Qualified as defending champions					
(Switzerland) 1954	Group stage	10th	3	1	0	2	6	7	2	2	0	0	7	2
(Sweden) 1958	Did not qualify								4	2	0	2	5	5
(Chile) 1962	Group stage	9th	3	1	1	1	3	2	2	2	0	0	10	2
(England) 1966	Group stage	9th	3	1	0	2	2	2	6	4	1	1	17	3
(Mexico) 1970	Runners-up	2nd	6	3	2	1	10	8	4	3	1	0	10	3
(West Germany) 1974	Group stage	10th	3	1	1	1	5	4	6	4	2	0	12	0
(Argentina) 1978	Fourth place	4th	7	4	1	2	9	6	6	5	0	1	18	4
(Spain) 1982	Champions	1st	7	4	3	0	12	6	8	5	2	1	12	5
(Mexico) 1986	Round of 16	12th	4	1	2	1	5	6	Qualified as defending champions					
(Italy) 1990	Third place	3rd	7	6	1	0	10	2	Qualified as hosts					
(United States) 1994	Runners-up	2nd	7	4	2	1	8	5	10	7	2	1	22	7
(France) 1998	Quarter-finals	5th	5	3	2	0	8	3	10	6	4	0	13	2
(South Korea) (Japan) 2002	Round of 16	15th	4	1	1	2	5	5	8	6	2	0	16	3
(Germany) 2006	Champions	1st	7	5	2	0	12	2	10	7	2	1	17	8
(South Africa) 2010	Group stage	26th	3	0	2	1	4	5	10	7	3	0	18	7
(Brazil) 2014	Group stage	22nd	3	1	0	2	2	3	10	6	4	0	19	9
(Russia) 2018	Did not qualify								12	7	3	2	21	9
(Qatar) 2022	Did not qualify								9	4	4	1	13	3
(Canada) (Mexico) (United States) 2026	Did not qualify								10	7	1	2	24	13
(Morocco) (Portugal) (Spain) 2030	To be determined								To be determined					
(Saudi Arabia) 2034	To be determined								To be determined					
Total	4 titles	18/23	83	45	21	17	128	77	128	85	31	12	258	85

* Denotes draws include knockout matches decided via penalty shoot-out.

Italy's World Cup record
First match	Italy 7–1 United States (27 May 1934; Rome, Italy)
Biggest win	Italy 7–1 United States (27 May 1934; Rome, Italy)
Biggest defeat	Switzerland 4–1 Italy (23 June 1954; Basel, Switzerland) Brazil 4–1 Italy (21 June 1970; Mexico City, Mexico)
Best result	Champions in 1934, 1938, 1982, and 2006
Worst result	26th place in 2010 (group stage)

=== UEFA European Championship ===
UEFA European Championship record									Qualification record					
Year	Round	Position	Pld	W	D*	L	GF	GA	Pld	W	D	L	GF	GA
(France) 1960	Did not enter								Did not enter					
(Spain) 1964	Did not qualify								4	2	1	1	8	3
(Italy) 1968	Champions	1st	3	1	2	0	3	1	8	6	1	1	21	6
(Belgium) 1972	Did not qualify								8	4	3	1	13	6
(Socialist Federal Republic of Yugoslavia) 1976	Did not qualify								6	2	3	1	3	3
(Italy) 1980	Fourth place	4th	4	1	3	0	2	1	Qualified as hosts					
(France) 1984	Did not qualify								8	1	3	4	6	12
(West Germany) 1988	Semi-finals	4th	4	2	1	1	4	3	8	6	1	1	16	4
(Sweden) 1992	Did not qualify								8	3	4	1	12	5
(England) 1996	Group stage	10th	3	1	1	1	3	3	10	7	2	1	20	6
(Belgium) (Netherlands) 2000	Runners-up	2nd	6	4	1	1	9	4	8	4	3	1	13	5
(Portugal) 2004	Group stage	9th	3	1	2	0	3	2	8	5	2	1	17	4
(Austria) (Switzerland) 2008	Quarter-finals	8th	4	1	2	1	3	4	12	9	2	1	22	9
(Poland) (Ukraine) 2012	Runners-up	2nd	6	2	3	1	6	7	10	8	2	0	20	2
(France) 2016	Quarter-finals	7th	5	3	1	1	6	2	10	7	3	0	16	7
(Europe) 2020	Champions	1st	7	5	2	0	13	4	10	10	0	0	37	4
(Germany) 2024	Round of 16	14th	4	1	1	2	3	5	8	4	2	2	16	9
(England) (Scotland) (Republic of Ireland) (Wales) 2028	To be determined								To be determined					
(Italy) (Turkey) 2032	Qualified as co-hosts								Qualified as co-hosts					
Total	2 titles	11/17	49	22	19	8	55	36	126	78	32	16	240	85

* Denotes draws include knockout matches decided via penalty shoot-out.

Italy's European Championship record
First match	Italy 0–0 Soviet Union (5 June 1968; Naples, Italy)
Biggest win	Turkey 0–3 Italy (11 June 2021; Rome, Italy) Italy 3–0 Switzerland (16 June 2021; Rome, Italy)
Biggest defeat	Spain 4–0 Italy (1 July 2012; Kyiv, Ukraine)
Best result	Champions in 1968 and 2020
Worst result	10th place in 1996 (group stage)

=== UEFA Nations League ===
UEFA Nations League record
League phase / quarter-finals													Finals								
Season	LG	Grp	Pos	Pld	W	D	L	GF	GA	P/R	Rnk	Round	Year	Pos	Pld	W	D*	L	GF	GA	Squad
2018–19	A	3	2nd	4	1	2	1	2	2	Same position	8th	Group stage	(Portugal) 2019	Did not qualify							
2020–21	A	1	1st	6	3	3	0	7	2	Same position	3rd	Passed	(Italy) 2021	3rd	2	1	0	1	3	3	Squad
2022–23	A	3	1st	6	3	2	1	8	7	Same position	3rd	Passed	(Netherlands) 2023	3rd	2	1	0	1	4	4	Squad
2024–25	A	2	2nd	8	4	2	2	17	13	Same position	5th	Quarter-finals	(Germany) 2025	Did not qualify							
2026–27	A	1	3rd	6	3	1	2	12	10	Same position	10th	Group stage	2027	Did not qualify							
Total				30	14	10	6	46	34	3rd			Total		4	2	0	2	7	7	—

* Denotes draws include knockout matches decided via penalty shoot-out.
** Group stage and quarter-finals played home and away. Flag shown represents hosts nations for the finals stage.

Italy's Nations League record
First match	Italy 1–1 Poland (7 September 2018; Bologna, Italy)
Biggest win	Italy 4–1 Israel (14 October 2024; Udine, Italy) Turkey 1–4 Italy (28 September 2026; Bursa, Turkey)
Biggest defeat	Germany 5–2 Italy (14 June 2022; Mönchengladbach, Germany) Belgium 4–1 Italy (15 November 2026; Brussels, Belgium)
Best result	3rd place in 2020–21 and 2022–23
Worst result	8th place in 2018–19

=== FIFA Confederations Cup ===
FIFA Confederations Cup record
Year	Round	Position	Pld	W	D*	L	GF	GA
(Saudi Arabia) 1992	Did not qualify							
(Saudi Arabia) 1995	Did not qualify							
(Saudi Arabia) 1997	Did not qualify							
(Mexico) 1999	Did not qualify							
(South Korea) (Japan) 2001	Did not qualify							
(France) 2003	Did not qualify							
(Germany) 2005	Did not qualify							
(South Africa) 2009	Group stage	5th	3	1	0	2	3	5
(Brazil) 2013	Third place	3rd	5	2	2	1	10	10
(Russia) 2017	Did not qualify							
Total	Third place	2/10	8	3	2	3	13	15

* Denotes draws include knockout matches decided via penalty shoot-out.

Italy's Confederations Cup record
First match	Italy 3–1 United States (15 June 2009; Pretoria, South Africa)
Biggest win	Italy 3–1 United States (15 June 2009; Pretoria, South Africa)
Biggest defeat	Brazil 3–0 Italy (21 June 2009; Pretoria, South Africa)
Best result	Third place in 2013
Worst result	Group stage in 2009

=== CONMEBOL–UEFA Cup of Champions ===
CONMEBOL–UEFA Cup of Champions record
Year	Round	Position	Pld	W	D*	L	GF	GA
(France) 1985	Did not qualify							
(Argentina) 1993	Did not qualify							
(England) 2022	Runners-up	2nd	1	0	0	1	0	3
(Qatar) 2026	Did not qualify							
Total	Runners-up	1/4	1	0	0	1	0	3

* Draws include knockout matches decided via penalty shoot-out.

Italy's CONMEBOL–UEFA Cup of Champions record
First match	Argentina 3–0 Italy (1 June 2022; London, England)
Biggest win	–
Biggest defeat	Argentina 3–0 Italy (1 June 2022; London, England)
Best result	–
Worst result	Runners-up in 2022

=== Central European International Cup ===
Central European International Cup record
Season	Round	Position	Pld	W	D*	L	GF	GA
1927–1930	Champions	1st	8	5	1	2	21	15
1931–1932	Runners-up	2nd	8	3	3	2	14	11
1933–1935	Champions	1st	8	5	1	2	18	10
1936–1938	– (Note: This edition of the tournament was interrupted due to the annexation of Austria to Nazi Germany on 12 March 1938, which meant that three games – all of which were Italy's – could not be played. As a result, no title was awarded.)	2nd	4	3	1	0	9	4
1948–1953	Fourth place	4th	8	3	2	3	10	9
1955–1960	Fifth place	5th	10	2	3	5	12	21
Total	2 titles	6/6	46	21	11	14	84	70

* Denotes draws include knockout matches decided via penalty shoot-out.

Italy's Central European International Cup record
First match	Italy 2–2 Czechoslovakia (23 October 1927; Prague, Czechoslovakia)
Biggest win	Hungary 0–5 Italy (11 May 1930; Budapest, Hungary)
Biggest defeat	Yugoslavia 6–1 Italy (12 May 1957; Zagreb, Yugoslavia)
Best result	Champions in 1927–30 and 1933–35
Worst result	Fifth place in 1955–60

=== Minor tournaments ===
Year	Round	Position	Pld	W	D*	L	GF	GA
(United States) 1976 U.S.A. Bicentennial Cup Tournament	Third place	3rd	3	1	0	2	7	7
(Mexico) 1985 Ciudad de México Cup Tournament	Champions	1st	2	1	1	0	3	2
(Sweden) 1991 Scania 100 Tournament	Champions	1st	1	1	0	0	3	1
(United States) 1992 U.S. Cup	Runners-up	2nd	3	1	2	0	3	1
1997 Tournoi de France	Fourth place	4th	3	0	2	1	5	7
Total	2 titles	4/4	12	4	5	3	21	18

* Denotes draws include knockout matches decided via penalty shoot-out.

== Head-to-head record ==
As of 15 November 2026, the complete official match record of the Italian national team comprises 905 matches: 484 wins, 243 draws and 178 losses. During these matches, the team scored 1,587 times and conceded 900 goals. Italy's highest winning margin is nine goals, which was achieved against the United States in 1948 (9–0). Their longest winning streak is 13 wins, and their unbeaten record is 37 consecutive official matches.

== Honours ==
=== Global ===
- FIFA World Cup
  - (gold) Champions (4): 1934, 1938, 1982, 2006
  - (silver) Runners-up (2): 1970, 1994
  - (bronze) Third place (1): 1990
- FIFA Confederations Cup
  - (bronze) Third place (1): 2013
- Olympic Games
  - (gold) Gold medal (1): 1936
  - (bronze) Bronze medal (1): 1928

=== Continental ===
- UEFA European Championship
  - (gold) Champions (2): 1968, 2020
  - (silver) Runners-up (2): 2000, 2012
- UEFA Nations League
  - (bronze) Third place (2): 2021, 2023

=== Intercontinental ===
- CONMEBOL–UEFA Cup of Champions
  - (silver) Runners-up (1): 2022

=== Regional ===
- Central European International Cup
  - (gold) Champions (2): 1927–30, 1933–35
  - (silver) Runners-up (1): 1931–32

=== Friendly ===
- Ciudad de México Cup Tournament
  - (gold) Champions (1): 1985
- Scania 100 Tournament
  - (gold) Champions (1): 1991

=== Awards ===
- FIFA Best Mover of the Year: 2006
- Laureus World Team of the Year: 2007, 2022
- World Soccer Team of the Year: 2021
- Gazzetta Sports World Team of the Year: 1982, 2006

=== Summary ===
Competition	1st place, gold medalist(s)	2nd place, silver medalist(s)	3rd place, bronze medalist(s)	Total
FIFA World Cup	4	2	1	7
FIFA Confederations Cup	0	0	1	1
Olympic Games	1	0	1	2
UEFA European Championship	2	2	0	4
UEFA Nations League	0	0	2	2
CONMEBOL–UEFA Cup of Champions	0	1	0	1
Total	7	5	5	17

== See also ==
- Italy women's national football team
- Italy national under-21 football team
- Italy national under-20 football team
- Italy national under-19 football team
- Italy national under-17 football team
- Italy national beach soccer team
- Italy national futsal team
- Serie A
- Football in Italy
- Sport in Italy

== Notes ==
Achievements
Preceded by 1930 Uruguay	World Champions; 1934 (First title); 1938 (Second title)	Succeeded by 1950 Uruguay
Preceded by 1978 Argentina	World Champions; 1982 (Third title)	Succeeded by 1986 Argentina
Preceded by 2002 Brazil	World Champions; 2006 (Fourth title)	Succeeded by 2010 Spain
Preceded by 1928 Uruguay	Olympic Champions; 1936 (First title)	Succeeded by 1948 Sweden
Preceded by 1964 Spain	European Champions; 1968 (First title)	Succeeded by 1972 West Germany
Preceded by 2016 Portugal	European Champions; 2020 (Second title)	Succeeded by 2024 Spain
Awards
Preceded by Renault F1	Laureus Team of the Year; 2007	Succeeded by South Africa rugby union
Preceded by Bayern Munich	Laureus Team of the Year; 2022	Succeeded by Argentina
