= Italy national football team all-time record =

The following tables show the Italy national football team's all-time international record.

== Performances ==
=== Performance by coach ===
Last match updated was on 15 November 2026.

#	Date	Name	% Win	Matches	Wins	Draws	Loses	GF	GA	Titles
1	15 May 1910 – 6 January 1911	Technical Commission: Umberto Meazza, Agostino Recalcati, Alberto Crivelli, Giannino Camperio, Giuseppe Gama	33.33	3	1	0	2	7	9	
2	9 April 1911 – 21 May 1911	Technical Commission: Umberto Meazza, Giannino Camperio, Luigi Livio, Beni	0.00	3	0	2	1	4	7	
3	17 March 1912	Technical Commission: Giannino Camperio, Alfredo Armano, Harry Goodley, Edoardo Pasteur, Francesco Calì, Giuseppe Servetto, Emilio Mégard; Coach: Umberto Meazza	0.00	1	0	0	1	3	4	
4	29 June 1912 – 3 July 1912	Vittorio Pozzo	33.33	3	1	0	2	4	8	
5	22 December 1912 – 12 January 1913	Technical Commission: Giannino Camperio, Alfredo Armano, Harry Goodley, Edoardo Pasteur, Francesco Calì, Giuseppe Servetto, Emilio Mégard	25.00	4	1	0	3	2	6	
6	1 May 1913 – 15 June 1913	Technical Commission: Umberto Meazza, Alfredo Armano, Harry Goodley, Carlo Ferraris, Luigi Faroppa, Ulisse Baruffini, Vittorio Pedroni; Coach: William Garbutt	50.00	2	1	0	1	1	2	
7	11 January 1914 – 17 May 1914	Technical Commission: Umberto Meazza, Vincenzo Resegotti, Alfredo Armano, Edoardo Pasteur, Francesco Calì, Hugo Rietmann, Vittorio Pedroni; Coach: William Garbutt	50.00	4	2	2	0	4	1	
8	31 January 1915 – 31 January 1915	Technical Commission: Vincenzo Resegotti, Alfredo Armano, Edoardo Pasteur, Francesco Calì, Hugo Rietmann, Antonio Scamoni, Melanio Laugeri	100.00	1	1	0	0	3	1	
9	18 January 1920 – 18 January 1920	Technical Commission: Vincenzo Resegotti, Alfredo Armano, Edoardo Pasteur, Francesco Calì, Hugo Rietmann, Antonio Scamoni, Melanio Laugeri; Coach: Vincenzo Resegotti	100.00	1	1	0	0	9	4	
10	28 March 1920	Technical Commission: Edoardo Pasteur, Francesco Mauro, Giuseppe Hess, Franco Varisco, Giuseppe Varetto, Romildo Terzolo; Coach: Vincenzo Resegotti	0.00	1	0	0	1	0	3	
11	13 May 1920	Technical Commission: Francesco Calì, Hugo Rietmann, Luigi Bianchi, Edgardo Minoli; Coach: Giuseppe Milano	0.00	1	0	1	0	1	1	
12	28 August 1920 – 2 September 1920	Technical Commission: Giuseppe Milano, Umberto Meazza, Francesco Calì, Edgardo Minoli e Luigi Saverio Bertazzoni	50.00	4	2	0	2	5	7	
13	20 February 1921 – 6 March 1921	Technical Commission: Giuseppe Milano, Umberto Meazza, Francesco Calì, Francesco Mauro, Vittorio Pozzo, Campi	100.00	2	2	0	0	4	2	
14	5 May 1921 – 8 May 1921	Technical Commission: Giuseppe Milano, Umberto Meazza, Romildo Terzolo	50.00	2	1	1	0	5	4	
15	6 November 1921	Technical Commission: Vincenzo Resegotti, Gino Agostini, Augusto Galletti; Coach: Antonio Cevenini	0.00	1	0	1	0	1	1	
16	15 January 1922 – 21 May 1922	Technical Commission: Vincenzo Resegotti, Gino Agostini, Augusto Galletti, Umberto Meazza, Silvio Marengo	33.33	3	1	2	0	8	6	
17	3 December 1922 – 27 May 1923	Technical Commission: Umberto Meazza, Augusto Galletti, Augusto Rangone	20.00	5	1	3	1	6	8	
18	20 January 1924	Technical Commission: Umberto Meazza, Augusto Galletti, Augusto Rangone, Gino Agostini, Mario Argento	0.00	1	0	0	1	0	4	
19	9 March 1924 – 2 June 1924	Vittorio Pozzo	40.00	5	2	1	2	5	9	
20	16 November 1924 – 18 June 1925	Technical Commission: Augusto Rangone, Giuseppe Milano (Lega Nord), Guido Baccani (Lega Sud)	33.33	6	2	1	3	11	6	
21	4 November 1925 – 10 June 1928	Augusto Rangone	50.00	24	12	7	5	68	45	1
22	14 October 1928 – 28 April 1929	Carlo Carcano	50.00	6	3	1	2	13	13	
23	1 December 1929 – 5 August 1948	Vittorio Pozzo	68.97	87	60	16	11	224	110	5
24	27 February 1949 – 2 July 1950	Technical Commission: Ferruccio Novo (president), Aldo Bardelli, Roberto Copernico, Vincenzo Biancone	55.56	9	5	1	3	18	11	
25	8 April 1951 – 25 November 1951	Technical Commission: Piercarlo Beretta, Antonio Busini, Gianpiero Combi	40.00	5	2	3	0	10	4	
26	24 February 1952 – 17 May 1953	Technical Commission: Carlino Beretta; Coach: Giuseppe Meazza	25.00	8	2	2	4	12	12	
27	13 November 1953 – 23 June 1954	Technical Commission: Lajos Czeizler, Angelo Schiavio; Coach: Silvio Piola	71.43	7	5	0	2	19	10	
28	5 December 1954 – 9 December 1956	Technical Commission: Angelo Schiavio, Luciano Marmo, Giuseppe Pasquale, Luigi Tentorio; Coach: Alfredo Foni	58.33	12	7	1	4	15	13	
29	25 April 1957 – 23 March 1958	Technical Commission: Angelo Schiavio, Luciano Marmo, Giuseppe Pasquale, Luigi Tentorio, Vincenzo Biancone; Coach: Alfredo Foni	28.57	7	2	1	4	10	16	
30	9 November 1958	Technical Commission: Giuseppe Viani, Vincenzo Biancone, Pino Mocchetti	0.00	1	0	1	0	2	2	
31	13 December 1958 – 29 November 1959	Technical Commission: Giovanni Ferrari, Vincenzo Biancone e Pino Mocchetti	0.00	5	0	4	1	6	7	
32	6 January 1960 – 13 March 1960	Giuseppe Viani	50.00	2	1	0	1	4	3	
33	10 December 1960 – 4 November 1961	Giovanni Ferrari	66.67	6	4	0	2	20	10	
34	5 May 1962 – 7 June 1962	Technical Commission: Paolo Mazza, Giovanni Ferrari	60.00	5	3	1	1	8	4	
35	11 November 1962 – 19 July 1966	Edmondo Fabbri	62.07	29	18	6	5	63	18	
36	1 November 1966 – 27 March 1967	Technical Commission: Helenio Herrera, Ferruccio Valcareggi	75.00	4	3	1	0	7	2	
37	25 June 1967 – 23 June 1974	Ferruccio Valcareggi	51.85	54	28	20	6	96	43	1
38	28 September 1974 – 8 June 1975	Fulvio Bernardini	16.67	6	1	2	3	2	5	
39	27 September 1975 – 8 June 1977	Fulvio Bernardini, Enzo Bearzot	68.75	16	11	2	3	34	16	
40	8 October 1977 – 17 June 1986	Enzo Bearzot	45.45	88	40	26	22	115	84	1
41	8 October 1986 – 12 October 1991	Azeglio Vicini	59.26	54	32	15	7	76	24	
42	13 November 1991 – 6 November 1996	Arrigo Sacchi	64.15	53	34	11	8	90	36	
43	22 January 1997 – 31 July 1998	Cesare Maldini	50.00	20	10	8	2	30	13	
44	1 August 1998 – 4 July 2000	Dino Zoff	47.83	23	11	7	5	34	19	
45	6 July 2000 – 15 July 2004	Giovanni Trapattoni	56.82	44	25	12	7	68	30	
46	16 July 2004 – 12 July 2006	Marcello Lippi	58.62	29	17	10	2	45	19	1
47	13 July 2006 – 26 June 2008	Roberto Donadoni	56.52	23	13	5	5	35	22	
48	27 June 2008 – 30 June 2010	Marcello Lippi	40.74	27	11	11	5	38	28	
49	1 July 2010 – 24 June 2014	Cesare Prandelli	41.07	56	23	20	13	79	58	
50	14 August 2014 – 2 July 2016	Antonio Conte	56.00	25	14	7	4	34	21	
51	18 July 2016 – 15 November 2017	Gian Piero Ventura	56.25	16	9	4	3	27	13	
52	5 February 2018 – 14 May 2018	Luigi Di Biagio (caretaker)	0.00	2	0	1	1	1	3	
53	14 May 2018 – 13 August 2023	Roberto Mancini	60.66	61	37	15	9	123	45	1
54	18 August 2023 – 9 June 2025	Luciano Spalletti	50.00	24	12	6	6	40	29	
55	15 June 2025 – 3 April 2026	Gennaro Gattuso	75.00	8	6	1	1	22	10	
56	10 April 2026 – 28 July 2026	Silvio Baldini (caretaker)	100.00	2	2	0	0	2	0	
57	28 July 2026 –	Roberto Mancini	50.00	6	3	1	2	12	10	

== Competition records ==
Champions Runners-up Third Place Tournament played fully or partially on home soil

=== FIFA World Cup ===
FIFA World Cup record									Qualification record					
Year	Round	Position	Pld	W	D*	L	GF	GA	Pld	W	D	L	GF	GA
(Uruguay) 1930	Did not enter								Did not enter					
(Italy) 1934	Champions	1st	5	4	1	0	12	3	1	1	0	0	4	0
(France) 1938	Champions	1st	4	4	0	0	11	5	Qualified as defending champions					
(Brazil) 1950	Group stage	7th	2	1	0	1	4	3	Qualified as defending champions					
(Switzerland) 1954	Group stage	10th	3	1	0	2	6	7	2	2	0	0	7	2
(Sweden) 1958	Did not qualify								4	2	0	2	5	5
(Chile) 1962	Group stage	9th	3	1	1	1	3	2	2	2	0	0	10	2
(England) 1966	Group stage	9th	3	1	0	2	2	2	6	4	1	1	17	3
(Mexico) 1970	Runners-up	2nd	6	3	2	1	10	8	4	3	1	0	10	3
(West Germany) 1974	Group stage	10th	3	1	1	1	5	4	6	4	2	0	12	0
(Argentina) 1978	Fourth place	4th	7	4	1	2	9	6	6	5	0	1	18	4
(Spain) 1982	Champions	1st	7	4	3	0	12	6	8	5	2	1	12	5
(Mexico) 1986	Round of 16	12th	4	1	2	1	5	6	Qualified as defending champions					
(Italy) 1990	Third place	3rd	7	6	1	0	10	2	Qualified as hosts					
(United States) 1994	Runners-up	2nd	7	4	2	1	8	5	10	7	2	1	22	7
(France) 1998	Quarter-finals	5th	5	3	2	0	8	3	10	6	4	0	13	2
(South Korea) (Japan) 2002	Round of 16	15th	4	1	1	2	5	5	8	6	2	0	16	3
(Germany) 2006	Champions	1st	7	5	2	0	12	2	10	7	2	1	17	8
(South Africa) 2010	Group stage	26th	3	0	2	1	4	5	10	7	3	0	18	7
(Brazil) 2014	Group stage	22nd	3	1	0	2	2	3	10	6	4	0	19	9
(Russia) 2018	Did not qualify								12	7	3	2	21	9
(Qatar) 2022	Did not qualify								9	4	4	1	13	3
(Canada) (Mexico) (United States) 2026	Did not qualify								10	7	1	2	24	13
(Morocco) (Portugal) (Spain) 2030 (Note: Additional matches are scheduled to be played in Argentina, Paraguay, and Uruguay in commemoration of the 100th anniversary of the first world cup, however they are not considered to be official hosts of the tournament.)
Total	4 titles	18/22	83	45	21	17	128	77	128	85	31	12	258	85

*Denotes draws include knockout matches decided via penalty shoot-out.

Italy's World Cup record
First match	Italy 7–1 United States (27 May 1934; Rome, Italy)
Biggest win	Italy 7–1 United States (27 May 1934; Rome, Italy)
Biggest defeat	Switzerland 4–1 Italy (23 June 1954; Basel, Switzerland) Brazil 4–1 Italy (21 June 1970; Mexico City, Mexico)
Best result	Champions in 1934, 1938, 1982, and 2006
Worst result	26th place in 2010 (group stage)

=== UEFA European Championship ===
UEFA European Championship record									Qualification record					
Year	Round	Position	Pld	W	D*	L	GF	GA	Pld	W	D	L	GF	GA
(France) 1960	Did not enter								Did not enter					
(Spain) 1964	Did not qualify								4	2	1	1	8	3
(Italy) 1968	Champions	1st	3	1	2	0	3	1	8	6	1	1	21	6
(Belgium) 1972	Did not qualify								8	4	3	1	13	6
(Socialist Federal Republic of Yugoslavia) 1976	Did not qualify								6	2	3	1	3	3
(Italy) 1980	Fourth place	4th	4	1	3	0	2	1	Qualified as hosts					
(France) 1984	Did not qualify								8	1	3	4	6	12
(West Germany) 1988	Semi-finals	3rd	4	2	1	1	4	3	8	6	1	1	16	4
(Sweden) 1992	Did not qualify								8	3	4	1	12	5
(England) 1996	Group stage	10th	3	1	1	1	3	3	10	7	2	1	20	6
(Belgium) (Netherlands) 2000	Runners-up	2nd	6	4	1	1	9	4	8	4	3	1	13	5
(Portugal) 2004	Group stage	9th	3	1	2	0	3	2	8	5	2	1	17	4
(Austria) (Switzerland) 2008	Quarter-finals	8th	4	1	2	1	3	4	12	9	2	1	22	9
(Poland) (Ukraine) 2012	Runners-up	2nd	6	2	3	1	6	7	10	8	2	0	20	2
(France) 2016	Quarter-finals	5th	5	3	1	1	6	2	10	7	3	0	16	7
(Europe) 2020	Champions	1st	7	5	2	0	13	4	10	10	0	0	37	4
(Germany) 2024	Round of 16	14th	4	1	1	2	3	5	8	4	2	2	16	9
(United Kingdom) (Republic of Ireland) 2028	To be determined								To be determined					
Total	2 titles	11/17	49	22	19	8	55	36	126	78	32	16	240	85

*Denotes draws include knockout matches decided via penalty shoot-out.

Italy's European Championship record
First match	Italy 0–0 Soviet Union (5 June 1968; Naples, Italy)
Biggest win	Turkey 0–3 Italy (11 June 2021; Rome, Italy) Italy 3–0 Switzerland (16 June 2021; Rome, Italy)
Biggest defeat	Spain 4–0 Italy (1 July 2012; Kyiv, Ukraine)
Best result	Champions in 1968 and 2020
Worst result	10th place in 1996 (group stage)

=== UEFA Nations League ===
UEFA Nations League record
League phase / quarter-finals													Finals								
Season	LG	Grp	Pos	Pld	W	D	L	GF	GA	P/R	Rnk	Round	Year	Pos	Pld	W	D*	L	GF	GA	Squad
2018–19	A	3	2nd	4	1	2	1	2	2	Same position	8th	Group stage	(Portugal) 2019	Did not qualify							
2020–21	A	1	1st	6	3	3	0	7	2	Same position	3rd	Passed	(Italy) 2021	3rd	2	1	0	1	3	3	Squad
2022–23	A	3	1st	6	3	2	1	8	7	Same position	3rd	Passed	(Netherlands) 2023	3rd	2	1	0	1	4	4	Squad
2024–25	A	2	2nd	8	4	2	2	17	13	Same position	5th	Quarter-finals	(Germany) 2025	Did not qualify							
2026–27	A	1	3rd	6	3	1	2	12	10	Same position	10th	Group stage	2027	Did not qualify							
Total				30	14	10	6	46	34	3rd			Total		4	2	0	2	7	7	—

* Denotes draws include knockout matches decided via penalty shoot-out.
** Group stage and quarter-finals played home and away. Flag shown represents hosts nations for the finals stage.

Italy's Nations League record
First match	Italy 1–1 Poland (7 September 2018; Bologna, Italy)
Biggest win	Italy 4–1 Israel (14 October 2024; Udine, Italy) Turkey 1–4 Italy (28 September 2026; Bursa, Turkey)
Biggest defeat	Germany 5–2 Italy (14 June 2022; Mönchengladbach, Germany) Belgium 4–1 Italy (15 November 2026; Brussels, Belgium)
Best result	3rd place in 2020–21 and 2022–23
Worst result	8th place in 2018–19

=== FIFA Confederations Cup ===
FIFA Confederations Cup record
Year	Round	Position	Pld	W	D*	L	GF	GA
(Saudi Arabia) 1992	No European team participated							
(Saudi Arabia) 1995	Did not qualify							
(Saudi Arabia) 1997	Did not qualify							
(Mexico) 1999	Did not qualify							
(South Korea) (Japan) 2001	Did not qualify							
(France) 2003	Did not enter (Note: As UEFA Euro 2000 runners-up.)							
(Germany) 2005	Did not qualify							
(South Africa) 2009	Group stage	5th	3	1	0	2	3	5
(Brazil) 2013	Third place	3rd	5	2	2	1	10	10
(Russia) 2017	Did not qualify							
Total	Third place	2/10	8	3	2	3	13	15

*Denotes draws include knockout matches decided via penalty shoot-out.

Italy's Confederations Cup record
First match	Italy 3–1 United States (15 June 2009; Pretoria, South Africa)
Biggest win	Italy 3–1 United States (15 June 2009; Pretoria, South Africa)
Biggest defeat	Brazil 3–0 Italy (21 June 2009; Pretoria, South Africa)
Best result	Third place in 2013
Worst result	Group stage in 2009

=== Central European International Cup ===
Central European International Cup record
Season	Round	Position	Pld	W	D	L	GF	GA
(Europe) 1927–30	Champions	1st	8	5	1	2	21	15
(Europe) 1931–32	Runners-up	2nd	8	3	3	2	14	11
(Europe) 1933–35	Champions	1st	8	5	1	2	18	10
(Europe) 1936–38	— (Note: This edition of the tournament was interrupted due to the annexation of Austria to Nazi Germany on 12 March 1938, which meant that three games – all of which were Italy's – could not be played. As a result, no title was awarded.)	2nd	4	3	1	0	9	4
(Europe) 1948–53	Fourth place	4th	8	3	2	3	10	9
(Europe) 1955–60	Fifth place	5th	10	2	3	5	12	21
Total	2 titles	6/6	46	21	11	14	84	70

Central European International Cup record
First match	Italy 2–2 Czechoslovakia (23 October 1927; Prague, Czechoslovakia)
Biggest win	Hungary 0–5 Italy (11 May 1930; Budapest, Hungary)
Biggest defeat	Yugoslavia 6–1 Italy (12 May 1957; Zagreb, Yugoslavia)
Best result	Champions in 1927-30 and 1933-35
Worst result	Fifth place in 1955-60

=== Other tournaments ===
Year	Round	Position	Pld	W	D	L	GF	GA
(United States) 1976 U.S.A. Bicentennial Cup Tournament	Round robin	3rd of 6	3	1	0	2	7	7
(Uruguay) 1980 World Champions' Gold Cup	Group stage	4th of 6	2	0	1	1	1	3
(Mexico) 1985 Ciudad de México Cup Tournament	Champions	1st of 3	2	1	1	0	3	2
(Sweden) 1991 Scania 100 Tournament	Champions	1st of 4	1	1	0	0	3	1
(United States) 1992 U.S. Cup	Round-robin	2nd of 4	3	1	2	0	3	1
1997 Tournoi de France	Round robin	4th of 4	3	0	2	1	5	7
(England) 2022 Finalissima	Runners-up	2nd of 2	1	0	0	1	0	3
Total			15	4	6	5	22	24

*Denotes draws include knockout matches decided via penalty shoot-out.

== Head-to-head record ==
Key

Positive balance (more wins than losses)
Neutral balance (as many wins as losses)
Negative balance (more losses than wins)

Last match updated was on 15 November 2026.

- Draws include Penalty shoot-outs
- Countries that are in italics are now defunct, as well as the matches played against the Europe XI and World XI teams

Opponent	Pld	W	D	L	GF	GA	GD	% W	Confederation
Albania	5	5	0	0	9	2	+7	100.00	UEFA
Algeria	1	1	0	0	1	0	+1	100.00	CAF
Argentina	16	6	5	5	23	19	+4	37.50	CONMEBOL
Armenia	4	3	1	0	17	5	+13	75.00	UEFA
Australia	1	1	0	0	1	0	+1	100.00	AFC
Austria	39	18	8	13	51	59	–8	46.15	UEFA
Azerbaijan	4	4	0	0	11	2	+9	100.00	UEFA
Belarus	4	2	2	0	9	5	+4	50.00	UEFA
Belgium	28	17	5	6	51	34	+17	60.71	UEFA
Bosnia and Herzegovina	7	4	2	1	11	5	+6	57.14	UEFA
Brazil	16	5	3	8	23	30	–7	31.25	CONMEBOL
Bulgaria	21	11	8	2	36	17	+19	52.38	UEFA
Cameroon	3	1	2	0	4	1	+3	33.33	CAF
Canada	1	1	0	0	2	0	+2	100.00	CONCACAF
Chile	3	1	1	1	4	4	0	33.33	CONMEBOL
China	1	1	0	0	2	0	+2	100.00	AFC
Costa Rica	2	1	0	1	1	1	0	50.00	CONCACAF
Croatia	10	1	6	3	11	11	0	10.00	UEFA
Cyprus	8	7	1	0	22	5	+17	87.50	UEFA
Czech Republic	7	3	2	2	11	6	+5	42.86	UEFA
Czechoslovakia	26	9	9	8	39	38	+1	34.61	UEFA
Denmark	13	8	2	3	24	16	+8	61.53	UEFA
East Germany	4	1	2	1	5	3	+2	25.00	UEFA
Ecuador	3	2	1	0	5	1	+4	66.67	CONMEBOL
Egypt	5	4	0	1	20	7	+13	80.00	CAF
England	32	11	11	10	35	39	–4	34.38	UEFA
Estonia	9	9	0	0	28	3	+25	100.00	UEFA
Europe XI	1	0	0	1	0	3	–3	0.00	—
Faroe Islands	4	4	0	0	11	2	+9	100.00	UEFA
Finland	15	13	1	1	36	8	+28	86.67	UEFA
France	43	20	11	12	90	62	+28	46.51	UEFA
Georgia	8	7	1	0	14	2	+12	87.50	UEFA
Germany	39	15	14	10	57	52	+5	38.46	UEFA
Ghana	1	1	0	0	2	0	+2	100.00	CAF
Greece	12	8	3	1	23	6	+17	66.67	UEFA
Haiti	2	1	1	0	5	3	+2	50.00	CONCACAF
Hungary	36	18	9	9	67	57	+10	50.00	UEFA
Iceland	2	0	1	1	0	2	–2	0.00	UEFA
Israel	9	8	1	0	28	9	+19	88.89	UEFA
Ivory Coast	2	0	1	1	1	2	–1	0.00	CAF
Japan	3	2	1	0	13	4	+9	66.66	AFC
Liechtenstein	4	4	0	0	20	0	+20	100.00	UEFA
Lithuania	8	6	2	0	19	1	+18	75.00	UEFA
Luxembourg	10	9	1	0	26	2	+24	90.00	UEFA
North Macedonia	5	2	2	1	10	7	+3	40.00	UEFA
Malta	10	10	0	0	27	2	+25	100.00	UEFA
Mexico	12	7	4	1	28	10	+18	58.33	CONCACAF
Moldova	7	7	0	0	19	2	+17	100.00	UEFA
Montenegro	2	2	0	0	4	1	+3	100.00	UEFA
Morocco	1	1	0	0	1	0	+1	100.00	CAF
Netherlands	24	11	10	3	33	24	+9	45.83	UEFA
New Zealand	2	1	1	0	5	4	+1	50.00	OFC
Nigeria	2	1	1	0	4	3	+1	50.00	CAF
North Korea	1	0	0	1	0	1	–1	0.00	AFC
Northern Ireland	12	8	3	1	21	6	+15	66.67	UEFA
Norway	19	10	4	5	23	20	+3	52.63	UEFA
Paraguay	3	2	1	0	6	2	+4	66.66	CONMEBOL
Peru	1	0	1	0	1	1	0	0.00	CONMEBOL
Poland	18	7	8	3	23	10	+13	38.89	UEFA
Portugal	27	18	3	6	51	23	+28	66.67	UEFA
Republic of Ireland	14	8	3	3	20	10	+10	57.14	UEFA
Romania	17	10	5	2	28	14	+14	58.82	UEFA
Russia	5	3	1	1	6	5	+1	60.00	UEFA
San Marino	3	3	0	0	15	0	+15	100.00	UEFA
Saudi Arabia	1	1	0	0	2	1	+1	100.00	AFC
Scotland	11	8	2	1	19	4	+15	72.72	UEFA
Serbia	2	1	1	0	4	1	+3	50.00	UEFA
Serbia and Montenegro	3	0	3	0	3	3	0	0.00	UEFA
Slovakia	2	1	0	1	5	3	+2	50.00	UEFA
Slovenia	7	4	1	2	5	3	+2	57.14	UEFA
South Africa	2	2	0	0	3	0	+3	100.00	CAF
South Korea	2	1	0	1	4	4	0	50.00	AFC
Soviet Union	11	2	5	4	7	9	–2	18.18	UEFA
Spain	41	11	16	14	46	46	0	26.83	UEFA
Sweden	25	11	7	7	28	25	+3	44.00	UEFA
Switzerland	62	29	24	9	111	70	+41	46.77	UEFA
Tunisia	1	1	0	0	4	0	+4	100.00	CAF
Turkey	15	11	4	0	31	9	+22	73.33	UEFA
Ukraine	10	7	3	0	17	4	+13	70.00	UEFA
United States	13	9	3	1	37	5	+32	69.23	CONCACAF
Uruguay	11	3	4	4	12	11	+1	27.27	CONMEBOL
Venezuela	1	1	0	0	2	1	+1	100.00	CONMEBOL
Wales	10	8	0	2	24	5	+19	80.00	UEFA
World XI	1	1	0	0	6	2	+4	100.00	—
Yugoslavia	17	8	5	4	24	21	+3	47.05	UEFA
Total	905	484	243	178	1,587	900	+687	53.48	
