= List of Italy national football team managers =

This is a list of managers and Technical Commissions that have guided the Italy national football team since 1910.

During the earliest days of Italy's national football, and until the end of the 1950s it was common for a so-called Technical Commission to be appointed by the Italian Football Federation. The Commission took the role that a standard coach would currently play. Since the 1960s, the national team has been controlled by a manager or head coach, sometimes supported by a technical director.

The current coach of the national team is Roberto Mancini.

== Coaching history ==
Managers in italics were hired as caretakers

Manager(s)	Italy career
(Italy) Federal Technical commission	1910–1912
(Italy) Vittorio Pozzo	1912
(Italy) Federal Technical commission	1912–1924
(Italy) Vittorio Pozzo	1924
(Italy) Federal Technical commission	1924–1925
(Italy) Augusto Rangone	1925–1928
(Italy) Carlo Carcano	1928–1929
(Italy) Vittorio Pozzo	1929–1948
(Italy) Federal Technical commission	1949–1959
(Italy) Giuseppe Viani	1960
(Italy) Giovanni Ferrari	1960–1961
(Italy) Giovanni Ferrari and Paolo Mazza	1962
(Italy) Edmondo Fabbri	1962–1966
(Argentina) Helenio Herrera and (Italy) Ferruccio Valcareggi	1966–1967
(Italy) Ferruccio Valcareggi	1967–1974
(Italy) Fulvio Bernardini	1974–1975
(Italy) Fulvio Bernardini and Enzo Bearzot	1975–1977
(Italy) Enzo Bearzot	1977–1986
(Italy) Azeglio Vicini	1986–1991
(Italy) Arrigo Sacchi	1991–1996
(Italy) Cesare Maldini	1996–1998
(Italy) Dino Zoff	1998–2000
(Italy) Giovanni Trapattoni	2000–2004
(Italy) Marcello Lippi	2004–2006
(Italy) Roberto Donadoni	2006–2008
(Italy) Marcello Lippi	2008–2010
(Italy) Cesare Prandelli	2010–2014
(Italy) Antonio Conte	2014–2016
(Italy) Gian Piero Ventura	2016–2017
(Italy) Luigi Di Biagio (caretaker)	2018
(Italy) Roberto Mancini	2018–2023
(Italy) Luciano Spalletti	2023–2025
(Italy) Gennaro Gattuso	2025–2026
(Italy) Silvio Baldini (caretaker)	2026
(Italy) Roberto Mancini	2026–present

== Chronological ==
As of 15 November 2026

#	Date	Name	% Win	Matches	Wins	Draws	Loses	GF	GA	Titles
1	15 May 1910 – 6 January 1911	Technical Commission: Umberto Meazza, Agostino Recalcati, Alberto Crivelli, Giannino Camperio, Giuseppe Gama	33.33	3	1	0	2	7	9	
2	9 April 1911 – 21 May 1911	Technical Commission: Umberto Meazza, Giannino Camperio, Luigi Livio, Beni	0.00	3	0	2	1	4	7	
3	17 March 1912	Technical Commission: Giannino Camperio, Alfredo Armano, Harry Goodley, Edoardo Pasteur, Francesco Calì, Giuseppe Servetto, Emilio Mégard; Coach: Umberto Meazza	0.00	1	0	0	1	3	4	
4	29 June 1912 – 3 July 1912	Vittorio Pozzo	33.33	3	1	0	2	4	8	
5	22 December 1912 – 12 January 1913	Technical Commission: Giannino Camperio, Alfredo Armano, Harry Goodley, Edoardo Pasteur, Francesco Calì, Giuseppe Servetto, Emilio Mégard	25.00	4	1	0	3	2	6	
6	1 May 1913 – 15 June 1913	Technical Commission: Umberto Meazza, Alfredo Armano, Harry Goodley, Carlo Ferraris, Luigi Faroppa, Ulisse Baruffini, Vittorio Pedroni; Coach: William Garbutt	50.00	2	1	0	1	1	2	
7	11 January 1914 – 17 May 1914	Technical Commission: Umberto Meazza, Vincenzo Resegotti, Alfredo Armano, Edoardo Pasteur, Francesco Calì, Hugo Rietmann, Vittorio Pedroni; Coach: William Garbutt	50.00	4	2	2	0	4	1	
8	31 January 1915 – 31 January 1915	Technical Commission: Vincenzo Resegotti, Alfredo Armano, Edoardo Pasteur, Francesco Calì, Hugo Rietmann, Antonio Scamoni, Melanio Laugeri	100.00	1	1	0	0	3	1	
9	18 January 1920 – 18 January 1920	Technical Commission: Vincenzo Resegotti, Alfredo Armano, Edoardo Pasteur, Francesco Calì, Hugo Rietmann, Antonio Scamoni, Melanio Laugeri; Coach: Vincenzo Resegotti	100.00	1	1	0	0	9	4	
10	28 March 1920	Technical Commission: Edoardo Pasteur, Francesco Mauro, Giuseppe Hess, Franco Varisco, Giuseppe Varetto, Romildo Terzolo; Coach: Vincenzo Resegotti	0.00	1	0	0	1	0	3	
11	13 May 1920	Technical Commission: Francesco Calì, Hugo Rietmann, Luigi Bianchi, Edgardo Minoli; Coach: Giuseppe Milano	0.00	1	0	1	0	1	1	
12	28 August 1920 – 2 September 1920	Technical Commission: Giuseppe Milano, Umberto Meazza, Francesco Calì, Edgardo Minoli e Luigi Saverio Bertazzoni	50.00	4	2	0	2	5	7	
13	20 February 1921 – 6 March 1921	Technical Commission: Giuseppe Milano, Umberto Meazza, Francesco Calì, Francesco Mauro, Vittorio Pozzo, Campi	100.00	2	2	0	0	4	2	
14	5 May 1921 – 8 May 1921	Technical Commission: Giuseppe Milano, Umberto Meazza, Romildo Terzolo	50.00	2	1	1	0	5	4	
15	6 November 1921	Technical Commission: Vincenzo Resegotti, Gino Agostini, Augusto Galletti; Coach: Antonio Cevenini	0.00	1	0	1	0	1	1	
16	15 January 1922 – 21 May 1922	Technical Commission: Vincenzo Resegotti, Gino Agostini, Augusto Galletti, Umberto Meazza, Silvio Marengo	33.33	3	1	2	0	8	6	
17	3 December 1922 – 27 May 1923	Technical Commission: Umberto Meazza, Augusto Galletti, Augusto Rangone	20.00	5	1	3	1	6	8	
18	20 January 1924	Technical Commission: Umberto Meazza, Augusto Galletti, Augusto Rangone, Gino Agostini, Mario Argento	0.00	1	0	0	1	0	4	
19	9 March 1924 – 2 June 1924	Vittorio Pozzo	40.00	5	2	1	2	5	9	
20	16 November 1924 – 18 June 1925	Technical Commission: Augusto Rangone, Giuseppe Milano (Lega Nord), Guido Baccani (Lega Sud)	33.33	6	2	1	3	11	6	
21	4 November 1925 – 10 June 1928	Augusto Rangone	50.00	24	12	7	5	68	45	1
22	14 October 1928 – 28 April 1929	Carlo Carcano	50.00	6	3	1	2	13	13	
23	1 December 1929 – 5 August 1948	Vittorio Pozzo	68.97	87	60	16	11	224	110	5
24	27 February 1949 – 2 July 1950	Technical Commission: Ferruccio Novo (president), Aldo Bardelli, Roberto Copernico, Vincenzo Biancone	55.56	9	5	1	3	18	11	
25	8 April 1951 – 25 November 1951	Technical Commission: Piercarlo Beretta, Antonio Busini, Gianpiero Combi	40.00	5	2	3	0	10	4	
26	24 February 1952 – 17 May 1953	Technical Commission: Carlino Beretta; Coach: Giuseppe Meazza	25.00	8	2	2	4	12	12	
27	13 November 1953 – 23 June 1954	Technical Commission: Lajos Czeizler, Angelo Schiavio; Coach: Silvio Piola	71.43	7	5	0	2	19	10	
28	5 December 1954 – 9 December 1956	Technical Commission: Angelo Schiavio, Luciano Marmo, Giuseppe Pasquale, Luigi Tentorio; Coach: Alfredo Foni	58.33	12	7	1	4	15	13	
29	25 April 1957 – 23 March 1958	Technical Commission: Angelo Schiavio, Luciano Marmo, Giuseppe Pasquale, Luigi Tentorio, Vincenzo Biancone; Coach: Alfredo Foni	28.57	7	2	1	4	10	16	
30	9 November 1958	Technical Commission: Giuseppe Viani, Vincenzo Biancone, Pino Mocchetti	0.00	1	0	1	0	2	2	
31	13 December 1958 – 29 November 1959	Technical Commission: Giovanni Ferrari, Vincenzo Biancone e Pino Mocchetti	0.00	5	0	4	1	6	7	
32	6 January 1960 – 13 March 1960	Giuseppe Viani	50.00	2	1	0	1	4	3	
33	10 December 1960 – 4 November 1961	Giovanni Ferrari	66.67	6	4	0	2	20	10	
34	5 May 1962 – 7 June 1962	Technical Commission: Paolo Mazza, Giovanni Ferrari	60.00	5	3	1	1	8	4	
35	11 November 1962 – 19 July 1966	Edmondo Fabbri	62.07	29	18	6	5	63	18	
36	1 November 1966 – 27 March 1967	Technical Commission: Helenio Herrera, Ferruccio Valcareggi	75.00	4	3	1	0	7	2	
37	25 June 1967 – 23 June 1974	Ferruccio Valcareggi	51.85	54	28	20	6	96	43	1
38	28 September 1974 – 8 June 1975	Fulvio Bernardini	16.67	6	1	2	3	2	5	
39	27 September 1975 – 8 June 1977	Fulvio Bernardini, Enzo Bearzot	68.75	16	11	2	3	34	16	
40	8 October 1977 – 17 June 1986	Enzo Bearzot	45.45	88	40	26	22	115	84	1
41	8 October 1986 – 12 October 1991	Azeglio Vicini	59.26	54	32	15	7	76	24	
42	13 November 1991 – 6 November 1996	Arrigo Sacchi	64.15	53	34	11	8	90	36	
43	22 January 1997 – 31 July 1998	Cesare Maldini	50.00	20	10	8	2	30	13	
44	1 August 1998 – 4 July 2000	Dino Zoff	47.83	23	11	7	5	34	19	
45	6 July 2000 – 15 July 2004	Giovanni Trapattoni	56.82	44	25	12	7	68	30	
46	16 July 2004 – 12 July 2006	Marcello Lippi	58.62	29	17	10	2	45	19	1
47	13 July 2006 – 26 June 2008	Roberto Donadoni	56.52	23	13	5	5	35	22	
48	27 June 2008 – 30 June 2010	Marcello Lippi	40.74	27	11	11	5	38	28	
49	1 July 2010 – 24 June 2014	Cesare Prandelli	41.07	56	23	20	13	79	58	
50	14 August 2014 – 2 July 2016	Antonio Conte	56.00	25	14	7	4	34	21	
51	18 July 2016 – 15 November 2017	Gian Piero Ventura	56.25	16	9	4	3	27	13	
52	5 February 2018 – 14 May 2018	Luigi Di Biagio (caretaker)	0.00	2	0	1	1	1	3	
53	14 May 2018 – 12 August 2023	Roberto Mancini	60.66	61	37	15	9	123	45	1
54	18 August 2023 – 9 June 2025	Luciano Spalletti	50.00	24	12	6	6	40	29	
55	15 June 2025 – 3 April 2026	Gennaro Gattuso	75.00	8	6	1	1	22	10	
56	10 April 2026 – 28 July 2026	Silvio Baldini (caretaker)	100.00	2	2	0	0	2	0	
57	28 July 2026 –	Roberto Mancini	50.00	6	3	1	2	12	10	

== Per match ==
As of 15 November 2026

Position	Name	Year	% Win	Matches	Wins	Draws	Loses	GF	GA	Titles
1	Enzo Bearzot	27 September 1975 – 8 June 1977	68.75	16	11	2	3	34	16	
1	Enzo Bearzot	8 October 1977 – 17 June 1986	45.45	88	40	26	22	115	84	1
1	Enzo Bearzot	**Total**	**49.04**	**104**	**51**	**28**	**25**	**149**	**100**	**1**
2	Vittorio Pozzo	29 June 1912 – 3 July 1912	33.33	3	1	0	2	4	8	
2	Vittorio Pozzo	20 February 1921 – 6 March 1921	100.00	2	2	0	0	4	2	
2	Vittorio Pozzo	9 March 1924 – 2 June 1924	40.00	5	2	1	2	5	9	
2	Vittorio Pozzo	1 December 1929 – 5 August 1948	68.97	87	60	16	11	224	110	5
2	Vittorio Pozzo	**Total**	**67.01**	**97**	**65**	**17**	**15**	**237**	**129**	**5**
3	**Roberto Mancini**	14 May 2018 – 12 August 2023	60.66	61	37	15	9	123	45	1
3	**Roberto Mancini**	28 July 2026 –	50.00	6	3	1	2	12	10	
3	**Roberto Mancini**	**Total**	59.38'	**64**	**38**	**15**	10'	**127**	**50**	**1**
4	Ferruccio Valcareggi	1 November 1966 – 27 March 1967	75.00	4	3	1	0	7	2	
4	Ferruccio Valcareggi	25 June 1967 – 23 June 1974	51.85	54	28	20	6	96	43	1
4	Ferruccio Valcareggi	**Total**	**53.45**	**58**	**31**	**21**	**6**	**103**	**45**	**1**
5	Marcello Lippi	16 July 2004 – 12 July 2006	58.62	29	17	10	2	45	19	1
5	Marcello Lippi	27 June 2008 – 30 June 2010	40.74	27	11	11	5	38	28	
5	Marcello Lippi	**Total**	**50.00**	**56**	**28**	**21**	**7**	**83**	**47**	**1**
5	Cesare Prandelli	1 July 2010 – 24 June 2014	**41.07**	**56**	**23**	**20**	**13**	**79**	**58**	
7	Azeglio Vicini	8 October 1986 – 12 October 1991	**59.26**	**54**	**32**	**15**	**7**	**76**	**24**	
7	Arrigo Sacchi	13 November 1991 – 6 November 1996	**64.15**	**53**	**34**	**11**	**8**	**90**	**36**	
9	Giovanni Trapattoni	6 July 2000 – 15 July 2004	**56.82**	**44**	**25**	**12**	**7**	**68**	**30**	
10	Augusto Rangone	3 December 1922 – 27 May 1923	20.00	5	1	3	1	6	8	
10	Augusto Rangone	20 January 1924 – 20 January 1924	0.00	1	0	0	1	0	4	
10	Augusto Rangone	16 November 1924 – 18 June 1925	33.33	6	2	1	3	11	6	
10	Augusto Rangone	4 November 1925 – 10 June 1928	50.00	24	12	7	5	68	45	1
10	Augusto Rangone	**Total**	**41.67**	**36**	**15**	**11**	**10**	**85**	**63**	**1**
11	Umberto Meazza	15 May 1910 – 6 January 1911	33.33	3	1	0	2	7	9	
11	Umberto Meazza	9 April 1911 – 21 May 1911	0.00	3	0	2	1	4	7	
11	Umberto Meazza	17 March 1912 – 17 March 1912	0.00	1	0	0	1	3	4	
11	Umberto Meazza	22 December 1912 – 15 June 1913	25.00	4	1	0	3	2	6	
11	Umberto Meazza	11 January 1914 – 17 May 1914	50.00	4	2	2	0	4	1	
11	Umberto Meazza	28 August 1920 – 2 September 1920	50.00	4	2	0	2	5	7	
11	Umberto Meazza	20 February 1921 – 6 March 1921	100.00	2	2	0	0	4	2	
11	Umberto Meazza	5 May 1921 – 8 May 1921	50.00	2	1	1	0	5	4	
11	Umberto Meazza	15 January 1922 – 21 May 1922	33.33	3	1	2	0	8	6	
11	Umberto Meazza	3 December 1922 – 27 May 1923	20.00	5	1	3	1	6	8	
11	Umberto Meazza	20 January 1924 – 20 January 1924	0.00	1	0	0	1	0	4	
11	Umberto Meazza	**Total**	**34.38**	**32**	**11**	**10**	**11**	**48**	**58**	
12	Edmondo Fabbri	11 November 1962 – 19 July 1966	**62.07**	**29**	**18**	**6**	**5**	**63**	**18**	
13	Angelo Schiavio	13 November 1953 – 23 June 1954	71.43	7	5	0	2	19	10	
13	Angelo Schiavio	5 December 1954 – 9 December 1956	58.33	12	7	1	4	15	13	
13	Angelo Schiavio	25 April 1957 – 23 March 1958	28.57	7	2	1	4	10	16	
13	Angelo Schiavio	**Total**	**53.85**	**26**	**14**	**2**	**10**	**44**	**39**	
14	Antonio Conte	14 August 2014 – 2 July 2016	**56.00**	**25**	**14**	**7**	**4**	**34**	**21**	
15	Luciano Spalletti	18 August 2023 – 9 June 2025	**50.00**	**24**	**12**	**6**	**6**	**40**	**29**	
16	Roberto Donadoni	13 July 2006 – 26 June 2008	**56.52**	**23**	**13**	**5**	**5**	**35**	**22**	
16	Dino Zoff	1 August 1998 – 4 July 2000	**47.83**	**23**	**11**	**7**	**5**	**34**	**19**	
18	Fulvio Bernardini	28 September 1974 – 8 June 1975	16.67	6	1	2	3	2	5	
18	Fulvio Bernardini	27 September 1975 – 8 June 1977	68.75	16	11	2	3	34	16	
18	Fulvio Bernardini	**Total**	**54.55**	**22**	**12**	**4**	**6**	**36**	**21**	
18	Vincenzo Biancone	27 February 1949 – 2 July 1950	55.56	9	5	1	3	18	11	
18	Vincenzo Biancone	25 April 1957 – 23 March 1958	28.57	7	2	1	4	10	16	
18	Vincenzo Biancone	9 November 1958	0.00	1	0	1	0	2	2	
18	Vincenzo Biancone	13 December 1958 – 29 November 1959	0.00	5	0	4	1	6	7	
18	Vincenzo Biancone	**Total**	**31.82**	**22**	**7**	**7**	**8**	**36**	**36**	
20	Cesare Maldini	22 January 1997 – 31 July 1998	**50.00**	**20**	**10**	**8**	**2**	**30**	**13**	
21	Alfredo Foni	5 December 1954 – 9 December 1956	58.33	12	7	1	4	15	13	
21	Alfredo Foni	25 April 1957 – 23 March 1958	28.57	7	2	1	4	10	16	
21	Alfredo Foni	**Total**	**47.37**	**19**	**9**	**2**	**8**	**25**	**29**	
21	Luciano Marmo	5 December 1954 – 9 December 1956	58.33	12	7	1	4	15	13	
21	Luciano Marmo	25 April 1957 – 23 March 1958	28.57	7	2	1	4	10	16	
21	Luciano Marmo	**Total**	**47.37**	**19**	**9**	**2**	**8**	**25**	**29**	
21	Giuseppe Pasquale	5 December 1954 – 9 December 1956	58.33	12	7	1	4	15	13	
21	Giuseppe Pasquale	25 April 1957 – 23 March 1958	28.57	7	2	1	4	10	16	
21	Giuseppe Pasquale	**Total**	**47.37**	**19**	**9**	**2**	**8**	**25**	**29**	
21	Luigi Tentorio	5 December 1954 – 9 December 1956	58.33	12	7	1	4	15	13	
21	Luigi Tentorio	25 April 1957 – 23 March 1958	28.57	7	2	1	4	10	16	
21	Luigi Tentorio	**Total**	**47.37**	**19**	**9**	**2**	**8**	**25**	**29**	
25	Giovanni Ferrari	13 December 1958 – 29 November 1959	0.00	5	0	4	1	6	7	
25	Giovanni Ferrari	10 December 1960 – 4 November 1961	66.67	6	4	0	2	20	10	
25	Giovanni Ferrari	5 May 1962 – 7 June 1962	60.00	5	3	1	1	8	4	
25	Giovanni Ferrari	**Total**	**43.75**	**16**	**7**	**5**	**4**	**34**	**21**	
25	Giuseppe Milano	28 March 1920 – 28 March 1920	0.00	1	0	0	1	0	3	
25	Giuseppe Milano	13 May 1920 – 13 May 1920	0.00	1	0	1	0	1	1	
25	Giuseppe Milano	28 August 1920 – 2 September 1920	50.00	4	2	0	2	5	7	
25	Giuseppe Milano	20 February 1921 – 6 March 1921	100.00	2	2	0	0	4	2	
25	Giuseppe Milano	5 May 1921 – 8 May 1921	50.00	2	1	1	0	5	4	
25	Giuseppe Milano	16 November 1924 – 18 June 1925	33.33	6	2	1	3	11	6	
25	Giuseppe Milano	**Total**	**43.75**	**16**	**7**	**3**	**6**	**26**	**23**	
25	Gian Piero Ventura	18 July 2016 – 15 November 2017	**56.25**	**16**	**9**	**4**	**3**	**27**	**13**	
28	Gennaro Gattuso	15 June 2025 – 3 April 2026	**75.00**	**8**	**6**	**1**	**1**	**22**	**10**	
28	Luigi Di Biagio (caretaker)	5 February 2018 – 14 May 2018	**0.00**	**2**	**0**	**1**	**1**	**1**	**3**	
29	Silvio Baldini (caretaker)	10 April 2026 –	**100.00**	**2**	**2**	**0**	**0**	**2**	**0**	

- Coach in **bold** currently active.
