= Milano (disambiguation) =

Milano is the Italian name of Milan, one of the largest cities in Italy.

Milano may also refer to:

== Places ==
- El Milano, a village and municipality in western Spain
- Milano, Texas, a city in the United States
- Milano Hotel in Gualala, California, U.S.

== Brands and organizations ==
- Milano (cookie), a trademarked dessert
- Milano, the brand name used by the Pizza Express restaurant chain in Ireland
- Milano School of Management, Policy, and Environment, a public policy and management school located in New York City
- Alfa Romeo 75, which is sold in North America as the Milano
- Alfa Romeo Milano, an SUV renamed to Alfa Romeo Junior
- VienneMilano, an American hosiery brand and online boutique

== Popular culture ==
- The Milano (Marvel Cinematic Universe), a spacecraft owned by Peter Quill / Star-Lord in the film Guardians of the Galaxy
- Milano (album), by Italian composer Daniele Luppi and American rock band Parquet Courts
- Milano (newspaper), published in Milan from 1640 to 1768
- Easy Milano, a fortnightly magazine for the English speaking community of Milan
- Milano Films, an early 20th century Italian film production company

== Sports ==
- FK Milano Kumanovo, a football club in North Macedonia
- Milano Seamen, an American football club based in Milan
- Olimpia Milano, an Italian basketball team
- Power Volley Milano, an Italian volleyball team
- Scuderia Milano, a former Formula 1 constructor

== Other ==
- Milano (given name)
- Milano (surname)
- Milano, a later name of the US Liberty ship SS M. Michael Edelstein
- Volkswagen Milano, a 3 door concept electric taxicab revealed in 2010

== See also ==
- Milan (disambiguation)
