= Yarem Qayah =

Yarem Qayah or Yaremqayeh or Yarem Qayyah or Yarem Qiyeh (Persian: يارم قيه), also rendered as Yarim Qiyeh or Yarim Ghiyeh may refer to:

- Yarem Qayah-e Olya
- Yarem Qayah-e Sofla
- Yarem Qayah-e Vasat
