= Milano (surname) =

Milano is an Italian surname that may refer to the following notable people:

- Da Milano (disambiguation), multiple people
- Alyssa Milano (born 1972), American actress and former singer
- Anthony Milano (1888–1978), Italian American mobster
- Archie Milano (1918–1991), American football player
- Barbara Milano Keenan (born 1950), née Milano, Austrian-born American lawyer
- Billy Milano (21st century), American heavy metal bass guitarist
- Bob Milano (1939 or 1940–2025), American college baseball coach
- Brett Milano (born 1957), American music critic and columnist
- Carmen Milano (1929–2006), Italian American mobster
- Dan Milano (born 1972), American voice actor and director
- Dante Milano (1899–1991), Brazilian poet
- Derrick Milano (born 1993), American songwriter, rapper, and singer
- Ettore Milano (1925–2011), Italian racing cyclist
- Fabio Milano (born 1977), Italian baseball player
- Federico Milano, Irish engineer
- Felice Milano (1891–1915), Italian football forward
- Frank Milano, 21st century American judge of New York State and politician
- Frank Milano (1891–1970), boss of the Cleveland crime family
- Fred Milano (1939–2012), American doo-wop singer
- Giuseppe Milano (1887–1971), Italian football midfielder and manager
- Gustavo Milano (born 1961), Argentine rugby union footballer, coach and sports agent
- Jefferson Milano (born 1995), Venezuelan cyclist
- Kenneth W. Milano (born 1959), Kensington historian of Philadelphia
- Madonna Fitta de Milano, 17th-century Italian painter
- Mario Milano (1935–2016), Australian professional wrestler
- Mario Milano (bishop) (1936–2026), Italian Catholic archbishop
- Massimo Milano (born 1967), Italian music critic
- Matt Milano (born 1994), American football player
- Mauro Milano (born 1984), Argentine football player
- Michela Milano (born 1970), Italian computer scientist
- Peter Milano (1925–2012), Italian American mobster
- Ramona Milano (born 1969), Canadian actress
- Sonny Milano (born 1996), American ice hockey player
