= Milan (disambiguation) =

Milan is a major city in Italy.

Milan may also refer to:

== People, legendary figures and fictional characters ==
- Milan (given name), including a list of people, legendary figures and fictional characters
- Milan (surname), a list of people
- Milan (Kurdish tribe)
- Milan (art director), Indian film art director Milan Fernandez (c. 1969–2023)
- Milan (drag queen), American drag performer
- Milan the Leather Boy and Milan, stage names of Milan Radenkovich (1941–1971), American record producer and songwriter
- Milan (comics), Marvel Comics villain Francisco Milan

== Places ==
=== Italy ===
- Duchy of Milan, a state from 1395 to 1796
- Lordship of Milan, a state from 1259 to 1395, direct predecessor of the duchy
- Metropolitan City of Milan
- Province of Milan, a former province
- Archdiocese of Milan, a Catholic archdiocese
- Milan (camp), set up to house Jewish refugees after World War II

=== United States ===
- Milan, Georgia, a city
- Milan, Illinois, a village
- Milan, Indiana, a town
- Milan, Kansas, a city
- Milan, Michigan, a city
- Milan, Minnesota, a city
- Milan, Missouri, a city
- Milan, New Hampshire, a town
- Milan, New Mexico, a village
- Milan, New Orleans, Louisiana, a neighborhood
- Milan, New York, a town
- Mercer, Ohio, an unincorporated community originally named Milan
- Milan, Ohio, a village
- Milan, Tennessee, a city
- Milan, Washington, an unincorporated community
- Milan, Wisconsin, an unincorporated community
- Milan Township (disambiguation)

=== Elsewhere ===
- Milan, Quebec, Canada, a village
- Miran (Xinjiang), China, a historic site known as Milan in Standard Mandarin
- Milán, Caquetá, Colombia, a town and municipality
- Milan, West Azerbaijan, Iran, a village
- Parc de Milan, Lausanne, Switzerland, a public park

== Sports ==
- AC Milan, an Italian football team
- AC Milan Women, an Italian women's football team
- Inter Milan, an Italian football team
- Inter Milan (women), an Italian women's football team
- ACF Milan, a disbanded Italian women's football team
- Esporte Clube Milan, a Brazilian football team
- Milan (horse), a Thoroughbred racehorse
- Milan AC, a name for the HC Devils Milano ice hockey team in the 1993/94 season

== Military ==
- MILAN, a European anti-tank guided missile
- Milan (naval exercise), a biannual multilateral naval exercise hosted by the Indian Navy
- HMS Milan, a Royal Navy frigate
- French destroyer Milan (1934)
- Dassault Milan, a variant of the Mirage III fighter aircraft

== Film and television ==
- Milan (1942 film), an Indian film, with music by S. D. Burman
- Milan (1946 film), an Indian film starring Dilip Kumar, directed by Nitin Bose
- Milan (1958 film), an Indian film; see List of Bollywood films of 1958
- Milan (1967 film), an Indian film
- Milan (1995 film), an Indian film
- Milan (2004 film), a Filipino film
- Milan (2007 film), a German short film, Grand Prix winner at the Tampere Film Festival
- Milan (Indian TV series), an Indian drama television series

== Schools ==
- University of Milan, Milan, Italy
- Milan Conservatory, Milan, Italy
- International School of Milan, Milan, Italy
- Milan High School (Indiana)
- Milan High School (Michigan)
- Milan High School (Tennessee)

== Technology ==
- Epyc Milan, the third generation of AMD's Epyc line of server processors
- Milan, code name for the Microsoft PixelSense project's table top computer
- Milan, an Avnu Alliance networking protocol

== Transportation ==
- Mercury Milan, an automobile
- Milan, a series of German velomobile models
- SETCA Milan, a French light aircraft

== Other uses ==
- Federal Correctional Institution, Milan, Michigan, a US federal prison
- Milan Entertainment, a record company
- Milan Records, a record label
- Milan (cultural festival), a cultural fest of SRM University, India

== See also ==
- Siege of Milan (disambiguation)
- Auxentius of Milan (died 374), Arian theologian and bishop of Milan
- Bertha of Milan (c. 997–c. 1040), countess margravine of Turin
- Landulf of Milan, late 11th-century historian of Milan
- Satyrus of Milan (c. 331–378), Italian prefect and Catholic administrator
- Vitalis of Milan (died 1st or 2nd century), early Christian martyr and saint
- Valeria of Milan (died 1st or 2nd century), wife of Vitalis
- Milan Decree, issued by Napoleon in 1897
- Edict of Milan, a 313 agreement to treat Christians benevolently within the Roman Empire
- Milan Racer, a German hang glider made by Bautek
- Savoy cabbage, also known as Milan cabbage
- Old Milan, Indiana
- Milano (disambiguation)
- Milana (disambiguation)
