= List of Italy national football team captains =

This is a list of all the captains who played for the Italy national football team.

Francesco Calì was the first captain of the Italy national football team.

The only players who were captains in all matches they have played in the national team were Giuseppe Milano (11 appearances), Francesco Calì (2 caps) and Giulio Cappelli (2 caps).

Gianluigi Buffon wore the captain band the most times: 80.

Gianluigi Buffon is also the goalkeeper who has worn the captain band the most times: 80.

Valentino Mazzola and Sandro Mazzola as well as Cesare Maldini and Paolo Maldini are the only cases of father and son who have worn the captain band during their respective times on the national team. Goalkeepers, Gianluigi Buffon and Lorenzo Buffon are distant cousins. Attilio Ferraris and Pietro Ferraris, despite the same surname, are not relatives.

Gianluigi Donnarumma is the current captain of the national team.

== List of captains by appearances ==
Updated as of 15 November 2026.

Players in bold are still active. Players in italics served as the designated captain for his captaincy period.

#	Name	Captain	Appearances	Goals	National years	Captaincy years	Ref
1	Gianluigi Buffon	80	176	0	1997–2018	2010–2018 (Note: Gianluigi Buffon served as second acting captain in UEFA Euro 2008 after Alessandro Del Piero was named the team's acting captain, as Cannavaro was injured and unable to take part in the competition, however Del Piero was frequently deployed as a substitute. Although Buffon was officially named Italy's new captain in 2010, following Fabio Cannavaro's retirement subsequent to the 2010 FIFA World Cup, Andrea Pirlo was named the Italy national team's acting captain after the tournament (while Daniele De Rossi was named the team's second acting captain), as Buffon was ruled out until the end of the year due to injury, and only made his first appearance as Italy's official captain on 9 February 2011, in a 1–1 friendly away draw against Germany.)	
2	Fabio Cannavaro	79	136	2	1997–2010	2002–2010 (Note: During UEFA Euro 2008, Alessandro Del Piero was named the Italy national team's acting captain, as Cannavaro was injured and unable to take part in the competition, however Gianluigi Buffon was often played as captain as Del Piero was frequently deployed as a substitute.)	
3	Paolo Maldini	74	126	7	1988–2002	1994–2002	
4	Giacinto Facchetti	70	94	3	1963–1977	1966–1977	
5	Dino Zoff	59	112	0	1968–1983	1977–1983	
6	**Gianluigi Donnarumma**	40	89	0	2016–	2021–	
7	Giuseppe Bergomi	33	81	6	1982–1998	1988–1991	
8	Franco Baresi	31	81	1	1982–1994	1991–1994	
9	Adolfo Baloncieri	27	47	25	1920–1930	1927–1930	
10	Renzo De Vecchi	26	43	0	1910–1925	1920–1925	
10	Leonardo Bonucci	26	121	8	2010–2023	2014–2023	
12	Giampiero Boniperti	24	38	7	1947–1960	1952–1960	
13	Giorgio Chiellini	22	117	8	2004–2022	2012–2022	
14	Giuseppe Meazza	17	53	33	1930–1939	1937–1939	
14	Sandro Salvadore	17	36	2	1960–1970	1963–1966	
16	Umberto Caligaris	16	59	0	1922–1934	1931–1934	
17	Giuseppe Milano	11	11	0	1911–1914	1911–1914	
18	Gaetano Scirea	10	78	2	1975–1986	1984–1986	
19	Luigi Allemandi	9	24	0	1925–1936	1934–1936	
19	Silvio Piola	9	34	30	1935–1952	1940–1952	
19	Marco Tardelli	9	81	6	1976–1985	1983–1985	
19	Antonio Cabrini	9	73	9	1978–1987	1983–1987	
19	Andrea Pirlo	9	116	13	2002–2015	2010–2015	
24	Alessandro Altobelli	8	61	25	1980–1988	1986–1987	
24	Virginio Rosetta	8	52	0	1920–1934	1929–1934	
26	Riccardo Carapellese	7	16	10	1947–1956	1949–1950	
26	Luigi Cevenini	7	29	11	1915–1929	1925–1929	
26	Alessandro Del Piero	7	91	27	1995–2008	2004–2008	
29	Demetrio Albertini	6	79	3	1991–2002	1996–2000	
29	Carlo Annovazzi	6	17	0	1947–1952	1951–1952	
29	Lorenzo Buffon	6	15	0	1958–1962	1961–1962	
29	Sergio Cervato	6	28	4	1951–1960	1955–1959	
29	Daniele De Rossi	6	117	21	2004–2017	2007–2017	
29	Virgilio Fossati	6	12	1	1910–1915	1912–1915	
29	Cesare Maldini	6	14	0	1960–1963	1962–1963	
36	Gianpiero Combi	5	47	0	1924–1934	1931–1934	
36	Alessandro Mazzola	5	70	22	1963–1974	1972	
36	Valentino Mazzola	5	12	4	1942–1949	1947–1949	
36	Egisto Pandolfini	5	21	9	1950–1957	1952–1955	
40	Giancarlo Antognoni	4	73	7	1974–1983	1977–1981	
40	**Ciro Immobile**	4	57	17	2014–2023	2018–2023	
40	Gianni Rivera	4	60	14	1962–1974	1964–1965	
43	Alessandro Costacurta	3	59	2	1991–1998	1995–1997	
43	Attilio Ferraris	3	28	0	1926–1935	1934–1935	
43	**Alessandro Florenzi**	3	49	2	2012–2022	2020–2022	
43	Alessandro Nesta	3	78	0	1996–2006	2004	
43	Gianluca Vialli	3	59	16	1985–1992	1989–1992	
48	**Nicolò Barella**	2	75	10	2018–	2024–	
48	Romeo Benetti	2	55	2	1971–1980	1978–1979	
48	Giacomo Bulgarelli	2	29	7	1962–1967	1966	
48	Francesco Calì	2	2	0	1910	1910	
48	Giulio Cappelli	2	2	1	1936–1936	1936	
48	Fulvio Collovati	2	50	3	1979–1986	1985	
48	Giovanni Ferrari	2	44	14	1930–1938	1938	
48	Pietro Ferraris	2	14	3	1935–1947	1947	
48	Alfredo Foni	2	23	0	1936–1942	1936	
48	Gennaro Gattuso	2	73	1	2000–2010	2009	
48	Alberto Gilardino	2	57	19	2004–2013	2011–2013	
48	**Jorginho**	2	57	5	2016–2024	2021–2024	
48	Ardico Magnini	2	20	0	1953–1957	1956–1957	
48	Marco Materazzi	2	41	2	2001–2008	2004–2005	
48	Riccardo Montolivo	2	66	2	2007–2017	2013–2014	
48	Miguel Montuori	2	12	2	1956–1960	1959–1960	
48	Maino Neri	2	8	0	1948–1954	1948	
48	Gianluca Pagliuca	2	39	0	1990–1998	1994–1995	
48	Pietro Rava	2	30	0	1935–1946	1939–1942	
48	Armando Segato	2	20	0	1953–1959	1958–1959	
48	**Marco Verratti**	2	55	3	2012–2023	2019–2023	
48	Gianluca Zambrotta	2	98	2	1999–2010	2010	
70	Massimo Ambrosini	1	35	0	1999–2008	2006	
70	Roberto Baggio	1	56	27	1988–2004	1992	
70	**Federico Bernardeschi**	1	39	6	2016–2022	2021	
70	Fulvio Bernardini	1	26	3	1925–1932	1932	
70	Sergio Brighenti	1	9	2	1959–1961	1961	
70	Tarcisio Burgnich	1	66	2	1963–1974	1973	
70	Piero Campelli	1	11	0	1912–1921	1920	
70	Antonio Cassano	1	39	10	2003–2014	2011	
70	Gino Colaussi	1	25	15	1935–1940	1939	
70	**Bryan Cristante**	1	48	2	2017–	2025–	
70	**Giovanni Di Lorenzo**	1	53	5	2019–	2024–	
70	Antonio Di Natale	1	42	11	2002–2012	2009	
70	**Stephan El Shaarawy**	1	32	7	2012–	2020	
70	Ciro Ferrara	1	49	0	1987–2000	2000	
70	Claudio Gentile	1	71	1	1975–1984	1984	
70	Mario Gianni	1	6	0	1927–1933	1932	
70	**Lorenzo Insigne**	1	54	10	2012–2022	2018	
70	Giacomo Losi	1	11	0	1960–1962	1962	
70	Bruno Mora	1	21	4	1959–1965	1962	
70	Bruno Nicolè	1	8	2	1958–1964	1961	
70	Christian Panucci	1	57	4	1994–2008	2003	
70	Angelo Peruzzi	1	31	0	1995–2006	2005	
70	Alfredo Pitto	1	29	2	1928–1935	1935	
70	Giuseppe Rossi	1	30	7	2008–2014	2010	
70	Aristodemo Santamaria	1	11	3	1915–1923	1921	
70	Angelo Schiavio	1	21	15	1925–1934	1933	
70	**Salvatore Sirigu**	1	28	0	2010–2021	2020	
70	Luca Toni	1	47	16	2004–2009	2005	
Total	97 players	905			1910–2026	1910–2026	

== List of captains by captaincy period ==
List of captaincy periods of the various captains throughout the years.

- 1910 Francesco Calì
- 1911–1914 Giuseppe Milano
- 1914–1915 Virgilio Fossati
- 1920–1925 Renzo De Vecchi
- 1925–1927 Luigi Cevenini
- 1927–1930 Adolfo Baloncieri
- 1931–1934 Umberto Caligaris
- 1934 Gianpiero Combi
- 1935–1936 Luigi Allemandi
- 1937–1939 Giuseppe Meazza
- 1940–1947 Silvio Piola
- 1947–1949 Valentino Mazzola
- 1949–1950 Riccardo Carapellese
- 1951–1952 Carlo Annovazzi
- 1952–1960 Giampiero Boniperti
- 1961–1962 Lorenzo Buffon
- 1962–1963 Cesare Maldini
- 1963–1966 Sandro Salvadore
- 1966–1977 Giacinto Facchetti
- 1977–1983 Dino Zoff
- 1983–1985 Marco Tardelli
- 1985–1986 Gaetano Scirea
- 1986–1987 Antonio Cabrini
- 1988–1991 Giuseppe Bergomi
- 1991–1994 Franco Baresi
- 1994–2002 Paolo Maldini
- 2002–2010 Fabio Cannavaro
- 2010–2018 Gianluigi Buffon
- 2018–2022 Giorgio Chiellini
- 2022–2023 Leonardo Bonucci
- 2023 Ciro Immobile
- 2024– Gianluigi Donnarumma
