= Qurishkak =

Village in West Azerbaijan province, Iran

Qurishkak Persian: قوري شكاك
- Village
- Location within Iran
- Coordinates: 39°25′58″N 44°31′47″E
- Country: Iran
- Province: West Azerbaijan
- County: Maku
- District: Bazargan
- Rural District: Sari Su

Population (2016)
  - Total: 683
- Time zone: UTC+3:30 (IRST)

Qurishkak (Persian: قوري شكاك) (Note: Also romanized as Qūrīshkāk) is a village in Sari Su Rural District of Bazargan District in Maku County, West Azerbaijan province, Iran.

== Demographics ==
=== Population ===
At the time of the 2006 National Census, the village's population was 624 in 100 households, when it was in Chaybasar-e Jonubi Rural District of the Central District. The following census in 2011 counted 699 people in 143 households, by which time the village had been separated from the district in the formation of Bazargan District. Qurishkak was transferred to Sari Su Rural District created in the new district. The 2016 census measured the population of the village as 683 people in 162 households.
