= Ghalleh Zaghesi =

Village in West Azerbaijan province, Iran

Ghalleh Zaghesi Persian: غله زاغسي
- Village
- Country: Iran
- Province: West Azerbaijan
- County: Maku
- District: Bazargan
- Rural District: Sari Su

Population (2016)
  - Total: 334
- Time zone: UTC+3:30 (IRST)

Ghalleh Zaghesi (Persian: غله زاغسي) (Note: Also romanized as Ghalleh Zāghesī) is a village in Sari Su Rural District of Bazargan District in Maku County, West Azerbaijan province, Iran.

== Demographics ==
=== Population ===
At the time of the 2006 National Census, the village's population was 338 in 56 households, when it was in Chaybasar-e Jonubi Rural District of the Central District. The following census in 2011 counted 364 people in 71 households, by which time the village had been separated from the district in the formation of Bazargan District. Ghalleh Zaghesi was transferred to Sari Su Rural District created in the new district. The 2016 census measured the population of the village as 334 people in 77 households.
