= Milana =

Milana may refer to:

- Milana (given name), a Slavic feminine name
- Milana (film), a 2007 Indian Kannada-language romantic drama film

== See also ==
- Milan (disambiguation)
