= Sari Su Rural District =

Rural district in West Azerbaijan province, Iran

Sari Su Rural District Persian: دهستان ساری‌سو
- Rural District
- Location within Iran
- Coordinates: 39°26′N 44°29′E
- Country: Iran
- Province: West Azerbaijan
- County: Maku
- District: Bazargan
- Established: 2007
- Capital: Milan

Population (2016)
  - Total: 4,736
- Time zone: UTC+3:30 (IRST)

Sari Su Rural District (Persian: دهستان ساری‌سو) is in Bazargan District of Maku County, West Azerbaijan province, Iran. Its capital is the village of Milan.

== History ==
In 2007, Chaybasar-e Shomali Rural District and the city of Bazargan were separated from the Central District in the formation of Bazargan District. Sari Su Rural District was created in the new district.

== Demographics ==
=== Population ===
At the time of the 2011 census, the rural district's population was 4,271 inhabitants in 980 households. The 2016 census measured the population of the rural district as 4,736 in 1,222 households. The most populous of its 28 villages was Yarem Qayah-e Sofla, with 691 people.

=== Other villages in the rural district ===
- Ghalleh Zaghesi
- Kharmanyeri
- Qurishkak
- Takhteh Duz
- Tikmeh Kord
- Yarem Qayah-e Olya
