= Tikmeh Kord =

Village in West Azerbaijan province, Iran

Tikmeh Kord Persian: تيكمه كرد
- Village
- Location within Iran
- Coordinates: 39°29′27″N 44°33′10″E
- Country: Iran
- Province: West Azerbaijan
- County: Maku
- District: Bazargan
- Rural District: Sari Su

Population (2016)
  - Total: 315
- Time zone: UTC+3:30 (IRST)

Tikmeh Kord (Persian: تيكمه كرد) (Note: Also romanized as Tīkmeh Kord; also known as Tekmeh Kord, Tikme Qishlāq, Tīkmeh, Tīkmeh Kharābeh, Tīkmeh-ye Bālā, and Tokmeh) is a village in Sari Su Rural District of Bazargan District in Maku County, West Azerbaijan province, Iran.

== Demographics ==
=== Population ===
At the time of the 2006 National Census, the village's population was 298 in 51 households, when it was in Chaybasar-e Jonubi Rural District of the Central District. The following census in 2011 counted 313 people in 63 households, by which time the village had been separated from the district in the formation of Bazargan District. Tikmeh Kord was transferred to Sari Su Rural District created in the new district. The 2016 census measured the population of the village as 315 people in 86 households.
