= Kharmanyeri =

Village in West Azerbaijan province, Iran

Kharmanyeri Persian: خرمن يري
- Village
- Location within Iran
- Coordinates: 39°24′21″N 44°27′06″E
- Country: Iran
- Province: West Azerbaijan
- County: Maku
- District: Bazargan
- Rural District: Sari Su

Population (2016)
  - Total: 651
- Time zone: UTC+3:30 (IRST)

Kharmanyeri (Persian: خرمن يري) (Note: Also romanized as Kharmanyerī) is a village in Sari Su Rural District of Bazargan District in Maku County, West Azerbaijan province, Iran.

== Demographics ==
=== Population ===
At the time of the 2006 National Census, the village's population was 518 in 99 households, when it was in Qaleh Darrehsi Rural District of the Central District. The following census in 2011 counted 491 people in 128 households, by which time the village had been separated from the district in the formation of Bazargan District. Kharmanyeri was transferred to Sari Su Rural District created in the new district. The 2016 census measured the population of the village as 651 people in 172 households.
