= Milan Township =

Milan Township may refer to the following places in the United States:

- Milan Township, DeKalb County, Illinois
- Milan Township, Allen County, Indiana
- Milan Township, Michigan
- Milan Township, Erie County, Ohio

== See also ==
- Milan (disambiguation)
