= Takhteh Duz =

Village in West Azerbaijan province, Iran

Takhteh Duz Persian: تخته دوز
- Village
- Location within Iran
- Coordinates: 39°21′05″N 44°29′15″E
- Country: Iran
- Province: West Azerbaijan
- County: Maku
- District: Bazargan
- Rural District: Sari Su

Population (2016)
  - Total: 377
- Time zone: UTC+3:30 (IRST)

Takhteh Duz (Persian: تخته دوز) (Note: Also romanized as Takhteh Dūz; also known as Takhteh Dozī and Takhteh Dūzī) is a village in Sari Su Rural District of Bazargan District in Maku County, West Azerbaijan province, Iran.

== Demographics ==
=== Population ===
At the time of the 2006 National Census, the village's population was 324 in 59 households, when it was in Qaleh Darrehsi Rural District of the Central District. The following census in 2011 counted 328 people in 71 households, by which time the village had been separated from the district in the formation of Bazargan District. Takhteh Duz was transferred to Sari Su Rural District created in the new district. The 2016 census measured the population of the village as 377 people in 101 households.
