= Adriatica (camp) =

Post–World War II displaced person camp in Italy

Adriatica was a post–World War II displaced person camp in northern Italy.

It housed 1,650 refugees. Adriatica emphasised sport more than its counterpart in nearby Milan, and sent football (soccer), table tennis, and volleyball teams to play camps in southern Italy.
