= Milan, West Azerbaijan =

Village in West Azerbaijan province, Iran

Milan Persian: ميلان
- Village
- Location within Iran
- Coordinates: 39°20′36″N 44°25′57″E
- Country: Iran
- Province: West Azerbaijan
- County: Maku
- District: Bazargan
- Rural District: Sari Su

Population (2016)
  - Total: 545
- Time zone: UTC+3:30 (IRST)

Milan (Persian: ميلان) (Note: Also romanized as Mīlān) is a village in, and the capital of, Sari Su Rural District in Bazargan District of Maku County, West Azerbaijan province, Iran.

== Demographics ==
=== Population ===
At the time of the 2006 National Census, the village's population was 467 in 89 households, when it was in Qaleh Darrehsi Rural District of the Central District. The following census in 2011 counted 444 people in 103 households, by which time the village had been separated from the district in the formation of Bazargan District. Milan was transferred to Sari Su Rural District created in the new district. The 2016 census measured the population of the village as 545 people in 130 households.
