= Da Milano =

Da Milano means "of Milan" in Italian. It may refer to the following people:

- Aloisio da Milano, Italian architect who worked in Muscovy
- Francesco Canova da Milano, Italian composer for lute, early 16th century
- Giovanni da Milano, Italian painter of the 14th century
