= VienneMilano =

Manufacturer and retailer of hosiery

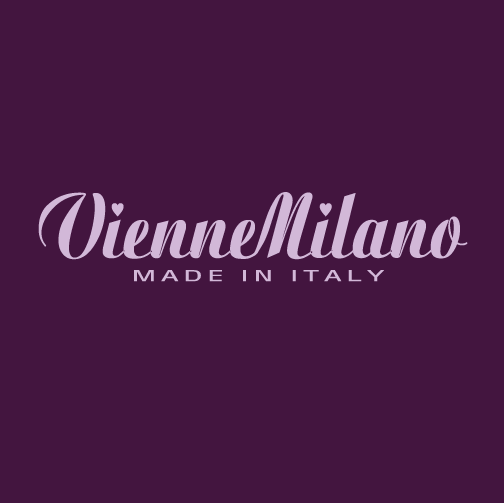
- Company type: Online Boutique
- Founded: Boston, Massachusetts (November 1, 2011)
- Key people: Vienne Cheung, Founder
- Products: Luxury Thigh High Stockings
- Website: viennemilano.com

VienneMilano is a hosiery brand and online boutique specializing in Italian thigh high stockings. Its website was officially launched November 1, 2011.

The brand's name comes from the first name of founder, Vienne Cheung, and from Milan, Italy, a city well known for its fashion.

VienneMilano is one of Multiverse Commerce's brands and microstores.

== Origin/History ==
VienneMilano was created as a result of Cheung's interest in Italian hosiery and her wish to change the stereotypes surrounding thigh highs in America. Cheung wanted to bring the high quality thigh highs she found traveling through Europe to the US market.

On November 1, 2011 along with the launch of the VienneMilano online boutique their first line of thigh highs was introduced.

On November 11, 2011 VienneMilano held a fashion show and keynote by Giuseppe Pastorelli, the Italian General Consul for New England, to celebrate the brand's launch and first collection at the InterContinental Boston.
