= Milan (camp) =

World War II displaced person camp

Milan was a post World War II displaced person camp in the city of Milan, one of the few such camps in a major Italian city. The city also served as the administrative centre for refugees in northern Italy.

The camp housed 1,100 Jewish refugees, many of whom came from Austria along the illegal emigration routes organised by the Bricha. Milan placed more emphasis on education than the nearby Adriatica camp, setting up a secular school and a yeshiva religious school, and sharing kosher beef with the camp at Cremona.
