= Federico Milano =

Irish professor

Federico Milano is a full professor with the School of Electrical and Electronic Engineering, University College, Dublin. He was named a Fellow of the Institute of Electrical and Electronics Engineers (IEEE) in 2016 for his contributions to power system modeling and simulation.

Milano received an Electrical Engineering degree in March 1999, and a Ph.D. in Electrical Engineering in June 2003 from the University of Genoa. From September 2001 to December 2002, he worked at the Electrical & Computer Engineering Department at the University of Waterloo as a visiting scholar. Milano subsequently joined the Department of Electrical Engineering of University of Castilla-La Mancha in September 2003, and worked there until May 2013. He joined UCD in June 2013.

Milano is an editor of several international journals published by IEEE, IET, Elsevier and Springer, including the IEEE Transactions on Power Systems and IET Generation, Transmission & Distribution.
