= Volkswagen Milano =

Prototype of an electric taxi

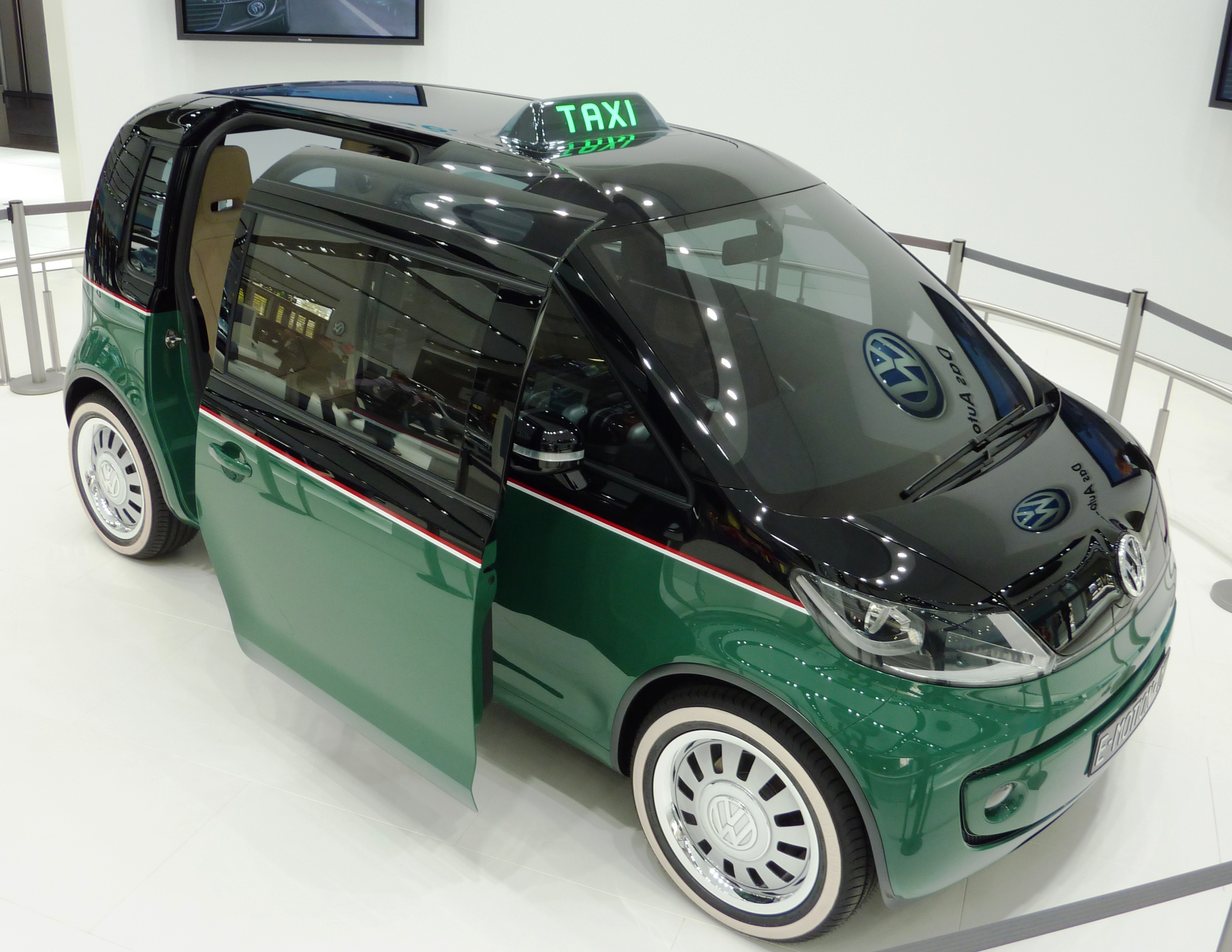
VW Milano Taxi Prototype

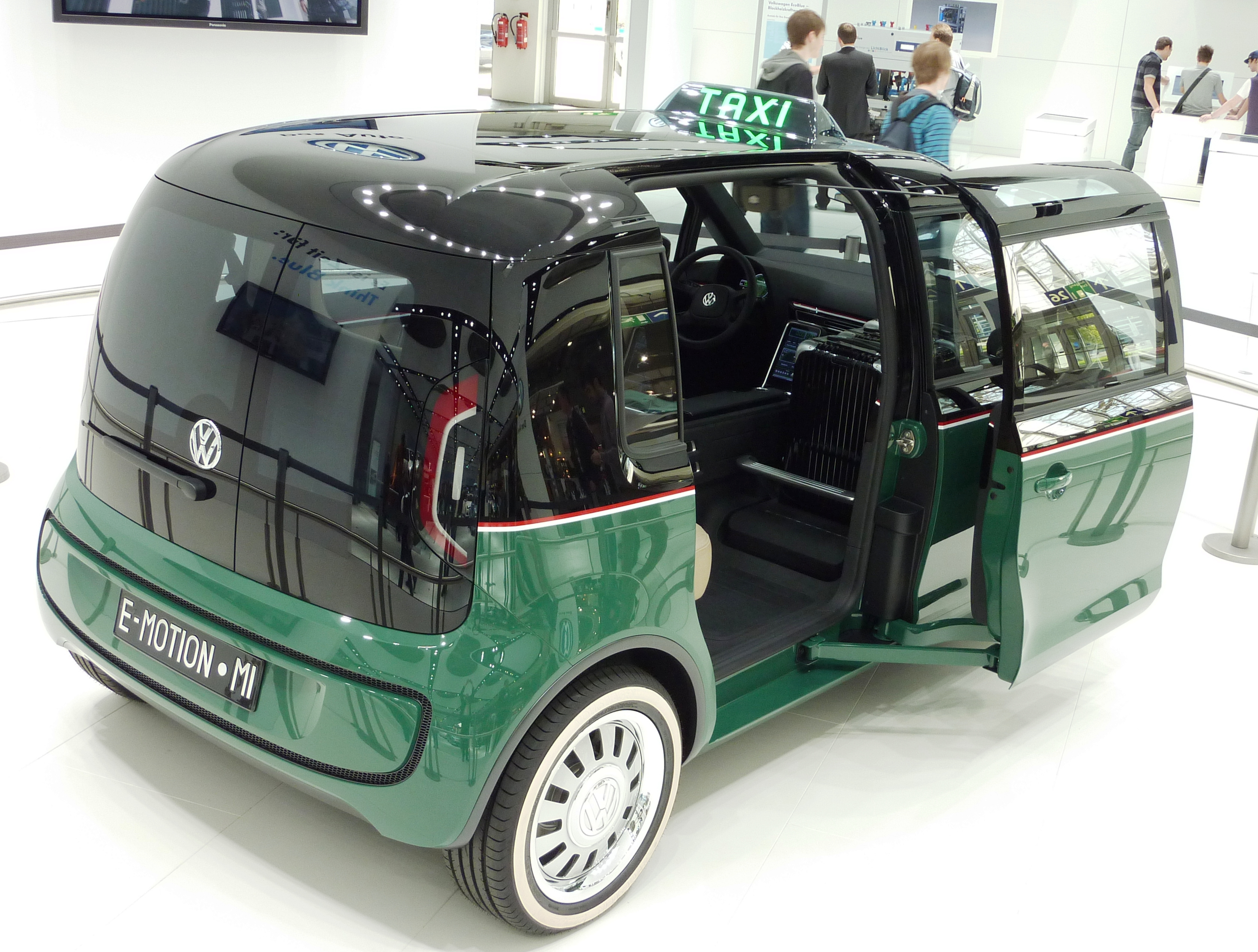
VW Milano Taxi

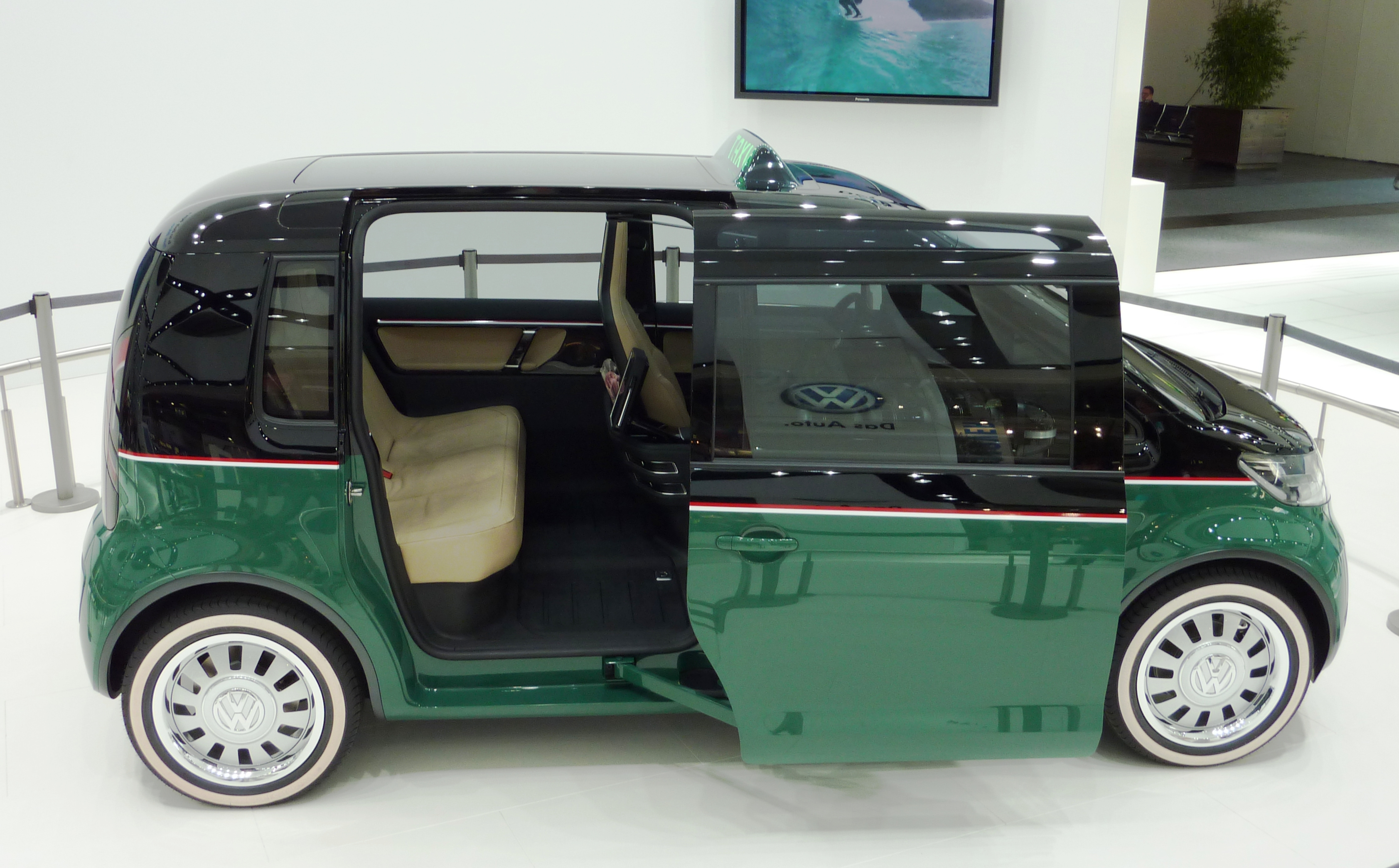
VW Milano Taxi

The Volkswagen Milano is a prototype of an electric taxi which was first presented at the Hanover Fair in April 2010. It is a van type car with three doors, an 85 kW electric motor and a 45 kWh lithium-ion battery. The market introduction was planned for the year 2013, which did not occur for unknown reasons.

== United Kingdom ==
The Milano was unveiled in London on December 14, 2010. On the same day, transport minister Philip Hammond unveiled the £5,000 electric car subsidy, and London Mayor Boris Johnson in his air quality strategy paper, set out plans to phase out the oldest of the LT Cabs in an effort to improve air quality. The plan included a £1 million fund to encourage taxi owners, to upgrade to low emission vehicles such as electric taxi cabs.
