= Yarem Qayah-e Sofla =

Village in West Azerbaijan province, Iran

Yarem Qayah-e Sofla Persian: يارم قيه سفلي
- Village
- Location within Iran
- Coordinates: 39°26′25″N 44°26′10″E
- Country: Iran
- Province: West Azerbaijan
- County: Maku
- District: Bazargan
- Rural District: Sari Su

Population (2016)
  - Total: 691
- Time zone: UTC+3:30 (IRST)

Yarem Qayah-e Sofla (Persian: يارم قيه سفلي) (Note: Also romanized as 'Yārem Qayah-e Soflá, Yarem Qayyah-e Soflá, and Yārem Qīyeh-ye Soflá; also known as Yarim Ghiyeh Sofla and Yārīm Qīyeh-ye Soflá) is a village in Sari Su Rural District of Bazargan District in Maku County, West Azerbaijan province, Iran.

== Demographics ==
=== Population ===
At the time of the 2006 National Census, the village's population was 573 in 129 households, when it was in Qaleh Darrehsi Rural District of the Central District. The following census in 2011 counted 625 people in 177 households, by which time the village had been separated from the district in the formation of Bazargan District. Yarem Qayah-e Sofla was transferred to Sari Su Rural District created in the new district. The 2016 census measured the population of the village as 691 people in 195 households. It was the most populous village in its rural district.
