= Milano (given name) =

Milano is a given name. Notable people with the name include:

- Milano Koenders (born 1986), Dutch footballer
