= Siege of Milan =

Siege of Milan may refer to:

- Siege of Milan (222 BC), a successful siege by the Romans against the Cisalpine Gauls
- Siege of Milan (268), a successful siege by the Roman emperor Gallienus against the usurper Aureolus
- Siege of Milan (402), an unsuccessful siege by the Visigoths against the Roman Empire
- Siege of Milan (452), a successful siege by the Huns against the Roman Empire
- Siege of Milan (538–539), a successful siege by the Ostrogoths against the Byzantine Empire
- Siege of Milan (1037), an unsuccessful siege by the Holy Roman Emperor against the archbishop of Milan
- Siege of Milan (1042–1044), a siege by the archbishop of Milan and the nobility against the nascent commune
- Siege of Milan (1158), a successful siege by the Holy Roman Emperor against rebels
- Siege of Milan (1161–1162), a successful siege by the Holy Roman Emperor against rebels
- Siege of Milan (1523), a successful siege by the Holy Roman Emperor against France
- Siege of Milan (1733), a successful siege by a Franco-Sardinian army against the Holy Roman Empire
