= Yarem Qayah-e Olya =

Village in West Azerbaijan province, Iran

Yarem Qayah-e Olya Persian: يارم قيه عليا
- Village
- Location within Iran
- Coordinates: 39°28′12″N 44°25′23″E
- Country: Iran
- Province: West Azerbaijan
- County: Maku
- District: Bazargan
- Rural District: Sari Su

Population (2016)
  - Total: 377
- Time zone: UTC+3:30 (IRST)

Yarem Qayah-e Olya (Persian: يارم قيه عليا) (Note: Also romanized as Yārem Qīyeh-ye ‘Olyā; also known as Jarmi Kaleh, Jermī Qal‘eh, Qeshlaq-e Yāremqayeh, Yārem Qayah-e ‘Olyā, Yārem Qayyah-e ‘Olyā, Yarim Ghiyeh, and Yārīm Qīyeh-ye ‘Olyā) is a village in Sari Su Rural District of Bazargan District in Maku County, West Azerbaijan province, Iran.

== Demographics ==
=== Population ===
At the time of the 2006 National Census, the village's population was 256 in 58 households, when it was in Qaleh Darrehsi Rural District of the Central District. The following census in 2011 counted 278 people in 72 households, by which time the village had been separated from the district in the formation of Bazargan District. Yarem Qayah-e Olya was transferred to Sari Su Rural District created in the new district. The 2016 census measured the population of the village as 377 people in 99 households.
