= Yarem Qayah-e Vasat =

Yarem Qayah-e Vasat يارم قيه وسط
- Village
- Location within Iran
- Coordinates: 39°28′09″N 44°25′45″E
- Country: Iran
- Province: West Azerbaijan
- County: Maku
- Bakhsh: Central
- Rural District: Qaleh Darrehsi

Population (2006)
  - Total: 100
- Time zone: UTC+3:30 (IRST)
  - Summer (DST): UTC+4:30 (IRDT)

Yarem Qayah-e Vasat (Persian: يارم قيه وسط, also Romanized as Yārem Qayah-e Vasaţ; also known as Yārem Qayyah-e Vosţā, Yārem Qīyeh-ye Vosţá, Yarim Ghiyeh Vosta, Yārīm Qīyeh-ye Vasaţ, and Yārīm Qīyeh-ye Vosţá) is a village in Qaleh Darrehsi Rural District, in the Central District of Maku County, West Azerbaijan Province, Iran. At the 2006 census, its population was 100, in 20 families.
