= Felice Milano =

Italian footballer

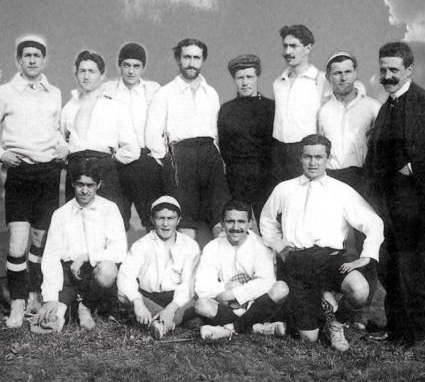
- Italian Football Champions 1908, Milano is in the front row furthest left

Personal information
- Full name: Felice Milano
- Date of birth: 23 May 1891
- Place of birth: Valentano, Italy
- Date of death: 11 November 1915 (aged 24)
- Place of death: Kanal, Slovenia
- Position: Forward

Senior career*
Years	Team	Apps	(Gls)
1907–1913	Pro Vercelli	33	(0)
1913–1915	Alessandria	32	(2)

International career
1912–1913	Italy	5	(0)
- * Club domestic league appearances and goals

Felice Milano (Italian pronunciation: [feˈliːtʃe miˈlaːno]; 23 May 1891 – 11 November 1915) was an Italian footballer who played as a forward. He represented the Italy national football team five times, the first being on 17 March 1912, the occasion of a friendly match against France in a 4–3 home loss. He was also part of Italy's squad for the football tournament at the 1912 Summer Olympics, but he did not play in any matches. He was an infantry corporal during the First World War. On March 17, 1912, in Italy-France 3-4, he played alongside his brother Giuseppe Milano, becoming the first pair of brothers to play for Italy. He died in 1915 in Zagora during the Battles of the Isonzo.

== Honours ==
=== Player ===
Pro Vercelli

Italian Football Championship: 1908, 1909, 1910–11, 1911–12, 1912–13
