= Hugo Eugen Rietmann =

Swiss-Italian footballer, referee and entrepreneur (1886–1959)

Ugo Rietmann
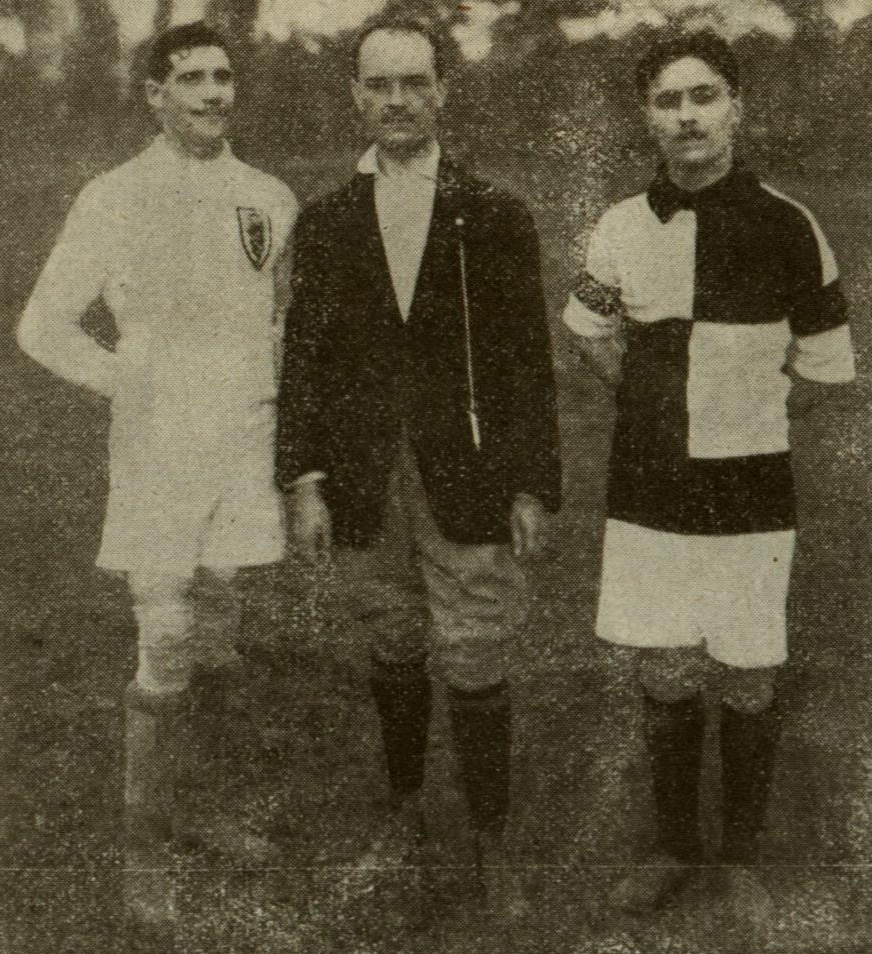
- Rietmann (centre) as referee with the captains of A.M.C. and U.S. Milanese, 12 October 1912.

Personal information
- Full name: Hugo Eugen Rietmann
- Date of birth: August 26, 1886
- Place of birth: Calprino, Canton Ticino, Switzerland
- Date of death: October 2, 1959 (aged 73)
- Place of death: Milan, Italy
- Position: Midfielder

Senior career*
Years	Team	Apps	(Gls)
1902	Mediolanum	?	(?)
1905–1906	F.C. Bergamo	?	(?)
1906–1907	Milan	0	(0)
1909	Internazionale	1	(0)

Managerial career
- 1914: Italy (Technical Commission)
- 1915: Italy (Technical Commission)
- 1920: Italy (Technical Commission)
- * Club domestic league appearances and goals

Hugo Eugen Rietmann, later known by the Italianized name Ugo (Calprino, 26 August 1886 – Milan, 2 October 1959), was a Swiss-born naturalized Italian entrepreneur, footballer, referee, and manager, who played as a midfielder.

A member of the ancient ruling patrician Rietmann family of St. Gallen, he is best remembered in sporting history as one of the key founding members of Inter Milan. In 1948, on the occasion of the 50th anniversary of the F.I.G.C. (Italian Football Federation), he was honored with the title of Pioneer of Italian Football.

== Biography ==
Born in Calprino (renamed Paradiso in 1929) in the Canton of Ticino and raised in the Kyburg castle, to Werner Rietmann and Maria Schlegelhe, he belonged to a historic Swiss patrician lineage. Rietmann settled in Milan, where he established himself as an entrepreneur and merchant in the textile industry, with offices located at Piazza della Scala No. 4.

Despite holding Swiss citizenship, he maintained a deep bond with Italy. During the Great War, he volunteered for the Royal Italian Army, serving as an officer in the Italian Red Cross.

He is buried at the Monumental Cemetery of Milan in the section dedicated to Protestants, listed among the "Illustrious Burials" of the cemetery.

== Sporting Career ==
=== Footballer and the Foundation of Inter ===
A passionate athlete, Rietmann began his football career playing for various Milanese and Lombard clubs of the era, including SEF Ginnastica Mediolanum, Foot-Ball Club Bergamo, and AC Milan. While at Milan, however, he never made an official appearance for the first team.

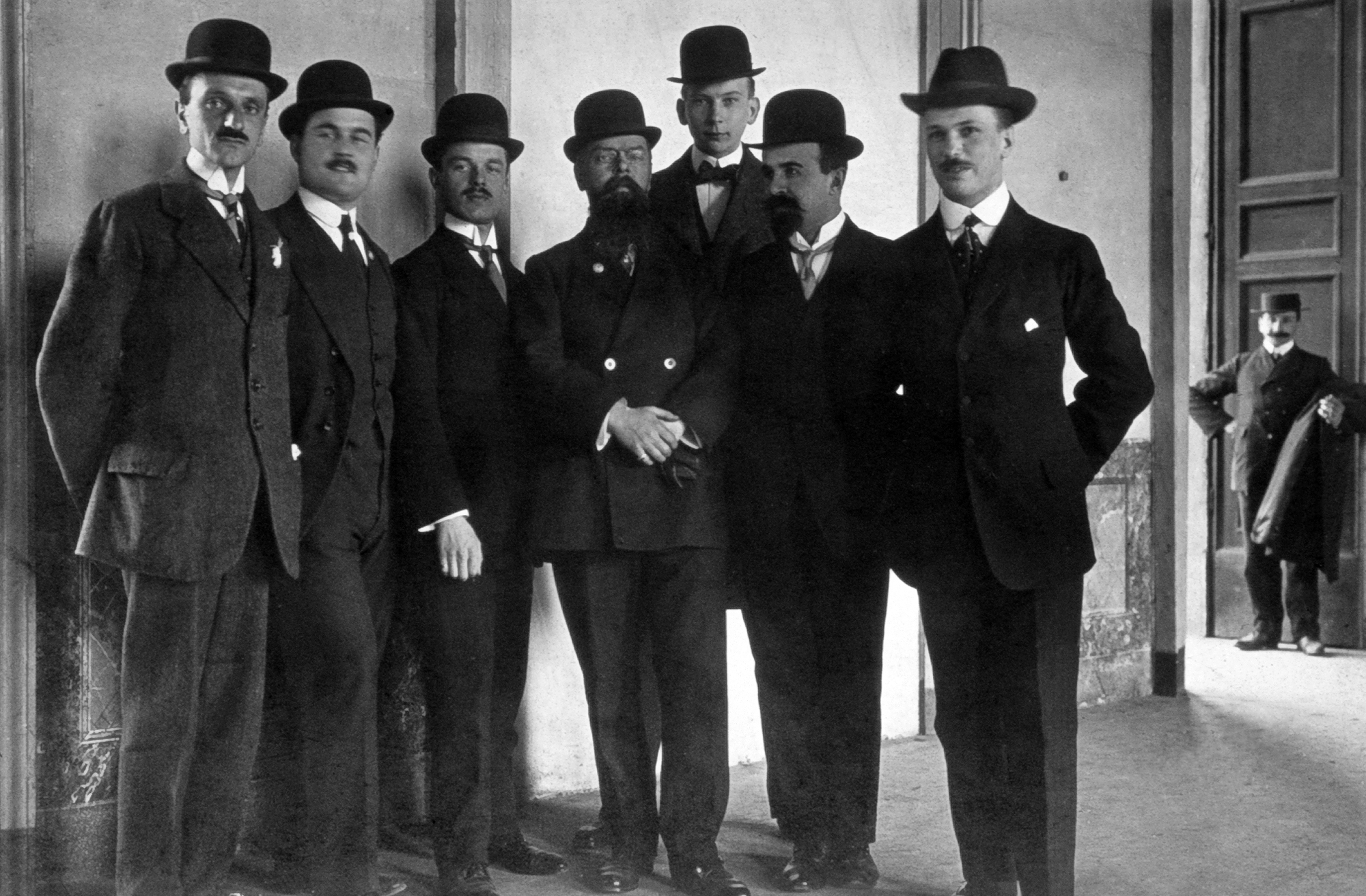
Hugo Rietmann posing in 1912 with several Inter founders and directors (from left: Paramithiotti (Pres.), Muggiani, Rietmann, Hirzel, Bach, Ansbacher, Glockner, and Hans Rietmann at the doorway on the right).

His legacy is inextricably linked to March 9, 1908. That evening, at the L'Orologio restaurant in Milan, Rietmann and his brother Hans were among the 44 dissidents who broke away from Milan to sign the founding charter of Foot-Ball Club Internazionale (Inter Milan). His name appears on the original founding document alongside other pioneers such as Giorgio Muggiani and the Hintermann brothers. During the founding meeting, his brother Hans was proposed as the club's first Economo (Treasurer), though the position was ultimately awarded by vote to Mr. Bosisio, then Secretary of the Italian Football Federation.

As a player for Inter, Rietmann occupied the role of midfielder. His time on the pitch was brief:

- He was part of the very first Nerazzurri lineup, which famously featured eight Swiss players.
- He made only one official appearance during the 1909 season: a 0–2 defeat against US Milanese on January 24, 1909.

=== Referee and Executive ===
After retiring from active play, Rietmann became a central figure in Italian football institutions:

- A.I.A. (Italian Referees Association): He was a founding member of the association in 1911 and served as its Auditor (Sindaco). In 1927, he helped establish the Milanese branch of the A.I.A., remaining an active executive for three decades.
- Italian National Team: Between 1914 and 1920, he was appointed three times as assistant coach to the Technical Commissions responsible for selecting and managing the Italian national team.
- On-field Activity: He refereed the First Category (top Italian division until 1922) from 1911 to 1920. Among his most notable matches as a referee was the 1913 semifinal of the Coppa Beretta-Rietmann between U.S. Milanese and Milan (2–0). The trophy was eventually won by Inter FC against Torino (3–2).

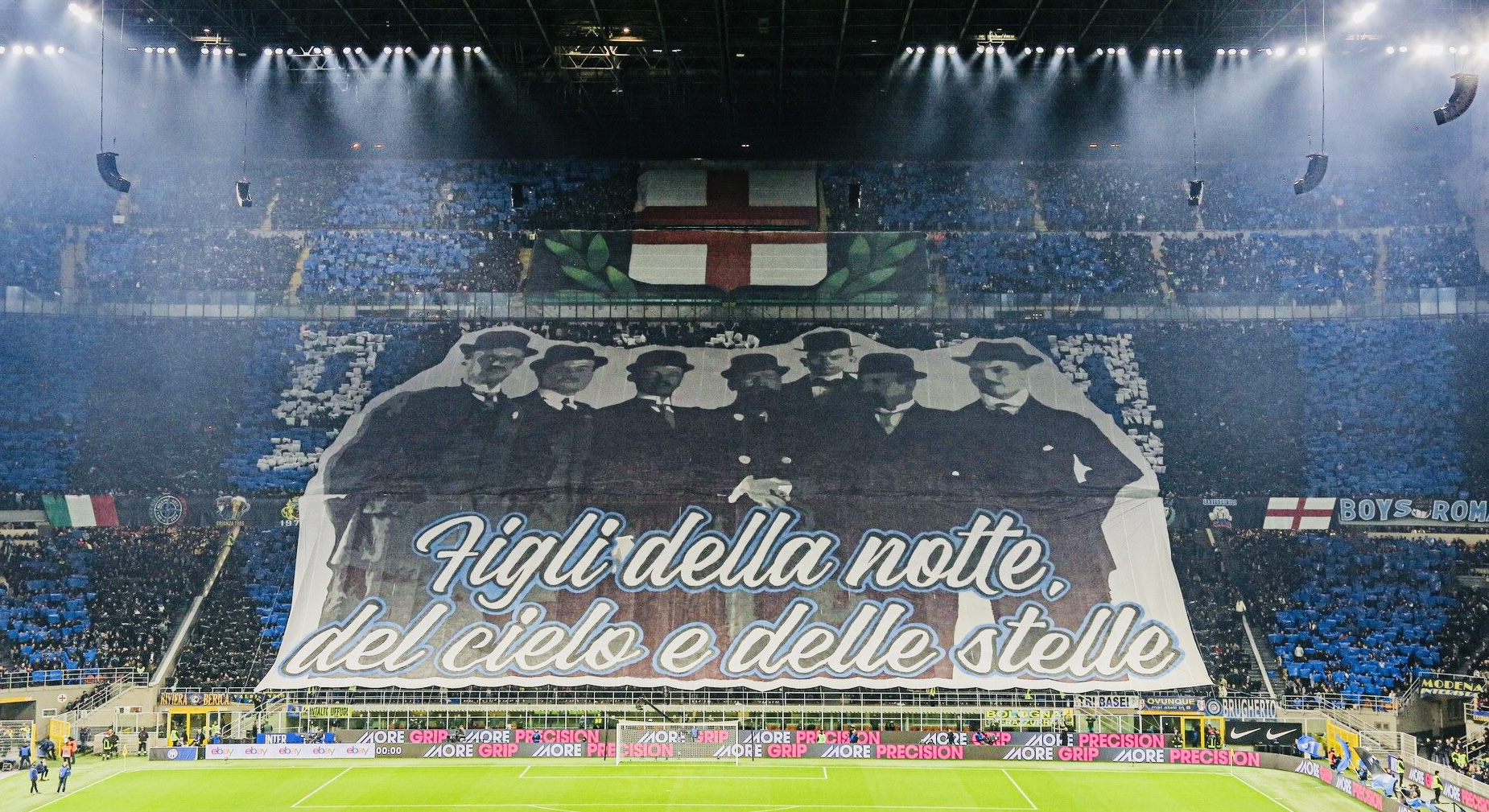
Inter supporters' choreography at San Siro featuring founders and directors (from left: Paramithiotti, Muggiani, Rietmann, Hirzel, Bach, Ansbacher, Glockner, and Hans Rietmann).

== Honors ==
- Pioneer of Italian Football (1898–1948): Awarded by the F.I.G.C. in 1948 to commemorate the 50th anniversary of the Federation.
