= Antonio Busini =

Italian footballer, coach, and official (1904-1975)

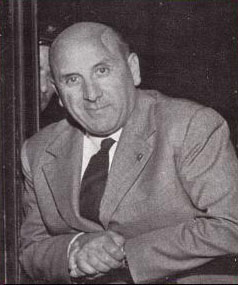

Personal information
- Date of birth: 5 July 1904
- Place of birth: Padua, Kingdom of Italy
- Date of death: 20 August 1975 (aged 71)
- Place of death: Riccione, Italy
- Height: 1.69 m (5 ft 7 in)
- Position: Midfielder

Senior career*
Years	Team	Apps	(Gls)
1920–1927	Padova	117	(46)
1927–1931	Bologna	102	(44)
1931–1933	Fiorentina	58	(5)
1933–1934	Padova	30	(6)
1934–1937	Sampierdarenese	63	(8)
1937	Milan	0	(0)
1938	Seregno		

International career
1929	Italy	1	(0)

Managerial career
- 1940–1941: Milan (tech. director)
- 1949–1953: Milan (tech. director)
- 1951: Italy (tech. commissioner)
- 1957-1958: Roma (assistant)
- 1959: Genoa (tech. director)
- * Club domestic league appearances and goals

Antonio Busini (Italian pronunciation: [anˈtɔːnjo buˈziːni]; 5 July 1904 – 20 August 1975) was an Italian professional football player, coach, and official, who played as a midfielder.

== Club career ==
Busini played for 8 seasons (196 games, 31 goals) in the Serie A for Bologna F.C. 1909, ACF Fiorentina, Calcio Padova and Sampierdarenese.

== International career ==
Busini played his only game for the Italy national football team on 28 April 1929 in a match against Germany.

== Personal life ==
His two older brothers (including the oldest Federico Busini) played football professionally. To distinguish them, Federico was referred to as Busini I and Antonio as Busini III.

== Honours ==
=== As a player ===
Bologna

- Serie A champion: 1928–29.

=== As a technical director ===
Milan

- Serie A champion: 1950–51.
- Latin Cup winner: 1951.
