= Giuseppe Viani =

Italian footballer (1909–1969)

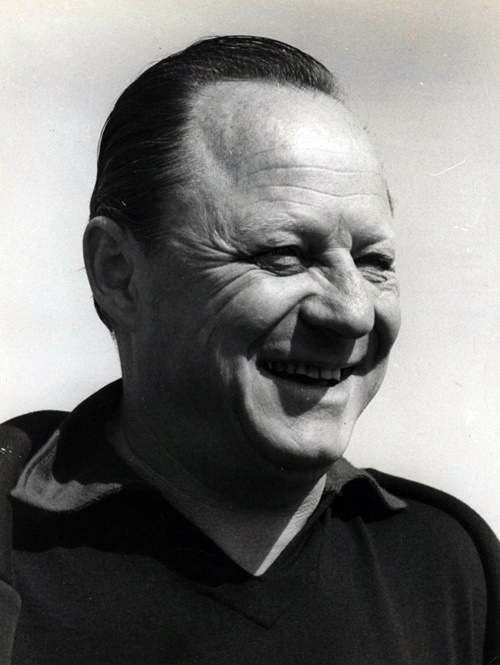

Personal information
- Date of birth: 13 September 1909
- Place of birth: Treviso, Italy
- Date of death: 6 January 1969 (aged 59)
- Place of death: Ferrara, Italy
- Position: Midfielder

Senior career*
Years	Team	Apps	(Gls)
1926–1928	Treviso	21	(10)
1928–1934	Ambrosiana	137	(11)
1934–1938	Lazio	114	(1)
1938–1939	Livorno	27	(0)
1939–1940	Juventus	5	(0)
1940–1942	Siracusa		
1942–1943	Salernitana		

Managerial career
- Siracusa
- 1945–1946: Benevento
- 1946–1948: Salernitana
- 1948–1949: Lucchese
- 1949–1951: Palermo
- 1951–1952: Roma
- 1952–1956: Bologna
- 1956–1965: A.C. Milan
- 1958: Hellas Verona
- 1960: Italy
- 1968: Bologna
- * Club domestic league appearances and goals

Giuseppe "Gipo" Viani (13 September 1909 – 6 January 1969) was an Italian football player and manager from the Province of Treviso who played as a midfielder.

== Playing career ==
Viani was born in Treviso. He played his entire career in the Italian football system; he is best known for his time with Ambrosiana and Lazio.

== Managerial career ==
After retiring from playing, Viani went on to manage many Italian football clubs, including A.C. Milan, Roma and the Italy national team amongst others; he coached Italy at the 1960 Summer Olympics in Rome, alongside Nereo Rocco, helping the team to a fourth-place finish in the tournament.

== Style of management ==
During his time with Salernitana in the 1940s, Viani devised a tactical system which came to be known in the Italian media as 'vianema', which was influenced by Karl Rappan's verrou, and which in turn also inspired the Italian catenaccio defensive strategy later popularised by Rocco and Helenio Herrera. The system originated from an idea that one of the club's players – Antonio Valese – posed to the manager. Viani altered the English WM system – known as the sistema in Italy – by having his centre-half-back – known as the centromediano metodista or "metodista," in Italy – retreat into the defensive line to act as an additional defender and mark an opposing centre-forward, instead leaving his full-back (which, at the time, was similar to the modern centre-back role) free to function as what was essentially a precursor to the sweeper role, creating a 1–3–3–3 formation; he occasionally also used a defender in the centre-forward role, and wearing the number nine shirt, to track back and mark the opposing forwards, thus freeing up the full-backs form their marking duties. His team would defend behind the ball and subsequently look to score from counter–attacks. Although this ultra-defensive strategy was initially criticised by members of the Italian press, including journalist Gianni Brera, Andrea Schianchi of La Gazzetta dello Sport notes that this modification was designed to help smaller teams in Italy, as the man–to–man system often put players directly against one another, favouring the larger and wealthier teams with stronger individual players.

== Honours ==
=== As a Player ===
Inter Milan

- Serie A: 1929–30

=== As a Manager ===
Salernitana

- Serie B: 1947–48

Roma

- Serie B: 1951–52

Milan

- Serie A: 1956–57, 1958–59
- European Cup runner-up: 1957–58

=== Individual ===
- Italian Football Hall of Fame: 2018
