= Francesco Calì =

Italian footballer, coach, and referee

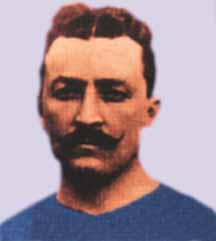

Personal information
- Date of birth: 16 May 1882
- Place of birth: Riposto, Italy
- Date of death: 3 September 1949 (aged 67)
- Place of death: Genoa, Italy
- Position: Defender

Senior career*
Years	Team	Apps	(Gls)
1897–1899	Zürich		
1899–1900	Urania Genève Sport		
1900–1901	Genoa	1	(0)
1901–1912	Andrea Doria	34	(5)

International career
1910	Italy	2	(0)
- * Club domestic league appearances and goals

Francesco Calì (Italian: [franˈtʃesko kaˈli]; 16 May 1882 – 3 September 1949) was an Italian professional football player, coach and referee, who played as a defender. He captained the Italy national football team in their first ever match, on 15 May 1910.

== Early life ==
Calì was born in Riposto, Sicily on 16 May 1882, to Bruno Calì, a wine merchant. After pirate assaults on his father's business, he and his family immigrated to Switzerland two years later; he was nicknamed Franz.

== Career ==
Calì played several games as a left-back for Swiss clubs Zürich and Urania Genève Sport. He then played for two rival Genovese teams: Genoa and Andrea Doria. He was also a referee during his time at Andrea Doria.

Due to his experience as a footballer, as well as his knowledge of several foreign languages, he was selected as the Italy national team captain, in their first ever game on 15 May 1910, in Milan against France, where Italy won 6–2.

After his retirement as a player, he was also chosen several times as a member of the technical commission, in 1912, 1914, 1915, 1920 and 1921.
