= Edmondo Fabbri =

Italian footballer and manager (1921–1995)

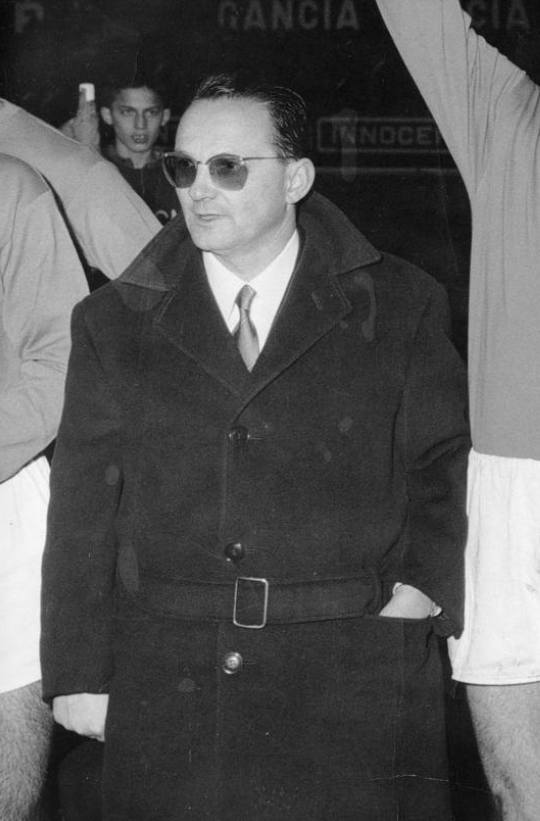
- Fabbri in 1962

Personal information
- Date of birth: 16 November 1921
- Place of birth: Castel Bolognese, Italy
- Date of death: 8 July 1995 (aged 73)
- Place of death: Castel San Pietro Terme, Italy
- Position: Winger

Senior career*
Years	Team	Apps	(Gls)
1938–1939	Imola		
1939–1940	Forlì		
1940–1942	Atalanta		
1942–1943	Ambrosiana		
1944	Faenza		
1945–1946	Inter		
1946–1947	Sampdoria		
1947–1950	Atalanta		
1950–1951	Brescia		
1951–1955	Parma		
1955–1957	Mantova		

Managerial career
- 1957–1962: Mantova
- 1962–1966: Italy
- 1967–1969: Torino
- 1969–1972: Bologna
- 1972–1973: Cagliari
- 1974–1975: Torino
- Ternana
- Pistoiese
- * Club domestic league appearances and goals

Edmondo Fabbri (16 November 1921 – 8 July 1995) was an Italian football player and coach; a fast player, he mainly played as a winger.

== Playing career ==
Fabbri was born in Castel Bolognese. During his club career, he played for several teams. He made his career debut with Imola in 1938, and he moved to Forlì (1939–40) the next season, later playing for Atalanta (1940–42, 1947–50) for two seasons, and subsequently with Inter (1942–43, 1945–46), and Faenza (1944), returning to Inter for a season in 1945. He moved to play with Sampdoria during the 1946–47 season, before returning to Atalanta for three seasons. He also later played for Brescia (1950–51), and Parma (1951–55), also winning the 1953–54 Serie C title. He ended his career with Mantova F.C. (1955–57). He also made one appearance for the Italian youth side in 1942.

== Managerial career ==
After retiring from football, Fabbri began a coaching career with Mantova in 1957, in Serie D, the team with which he had retired as a player. During his four years with the club, he took the club to Serie A during the 1961–62 season, winning the 1957–58 Serie D and the 1958–59 Serie C titles. In 1962, he was awarded the "Seminatore d'Oro" award for best coach, and he was subsequently appointed the head coach of the Italy national side.

Fabbri was the head coach of the Italy national team from 1962 to 1966, with a record of 18 wins, 6 draws and 5 losses, and led the team in the 1966 FIFA World Cup, where they were eliminated in the first round after surprisingly losing to North Korea; Fabbri was let go following Italy's elimination from the 1966 World Cup.

During his career, he also coached Torino (1967–69, 1974–75), Bologna (1969–72), Ternana (1976), Reggiana (1982–83) and Pistoiese (1980–81), helping the club to a Serie A spot. With Torino, he won a Coppa Italia in 1968, and he also won a second Coppa Italia title with Bologna, as well as the Anglo-Italian League Cup, in 1970.

== Death ==
Fabbri died at Castel San Pietro Terme on 8 July 1995.

== Honours ==
=== Player ===
Parma

- Serie C: 1953–54

=== Coach ===
Mantova

- Serie D: 1957–58
- Serie C: 1958–59

Torino

- Coppa Italia: 1967–68

Bologna

- Coppa Italia: 1969–70
- Anglo-Italian League Cup: 1970

=== Individual ===
- Seminatore d'oro (Serie A Best coach): 1961–62
