= Giuseppe Milano =

Italian footballer

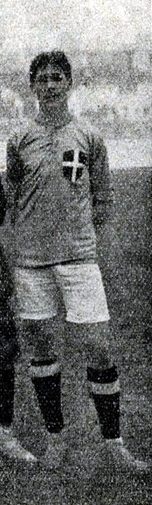
- Milano in 1911

Personal information
- Date of birth: 26 September 1887
- Place of birth: Mantua, Italy
- Date of death: 13 May 1971 (aged 83)
- Place of death: Vercelli, Italy
- Position: Midfielder

Senior career*
| Years | Team | Apps | (Gls) |
| 1906–1915 | Pro Vercelli | 110 | (15) |

International career
| 1911–1914 | Italy | 11 | (0) |
- * Club domestic league appearances and goals

Giuseppe Milano (Italian pronunciation: [dʒuˈzɛppe miˈlaːno]; 26 September 1887 – 13 May 1971) was an Italian footballer and manager who played as a midfielder. At club level, he spent his entire career with Pro Vercelli. With the Italy national football team, he competed in the men's tournament at the 1912 Summer Olympics at international level. On March 17, 1912, in Italy-France 3-4, he played alongside his brother Felice Milano, becoming the first pair of brothers to play for Italy.
